= List of documentary films =

This is an alphabetical list of documentary films with Wikipedia articles. The earliest documentary listed is Fred Ott's Sneeze (1894), which is also the first motion picture ever copyrighted in North America. The term documentary was first used in 1926 by filmmaker John Grierson as a term to describe films that document reality. For other lists, see Category:Documentary films by country and Category:Documentaries by topic.

== 0–9 ==
† = Series

Title	Year	Director(s)	Producer(s)
1:42.08	1966	George Lucas	George Lucas
1: Life On The Limit	2013	Paul Crowder	Michael Shevloff, Nigel Sinclair
1 More Hit	2007	Shauna Garr	Shauna Garr, John A. Causey III, and Landon Taylor
1-800-On-Her-Own	2024	Dana Flor	Amy Hobby, Emily Wachtel
2 Million Minutes †			
2 or 3 Things I Know About Him	2005	Malte Ludin	Iva Svarcova
3: The Dale Earnhardt Story	2004	Russell Mulcahy	Orly Adelson, Lynn Raynor
3 1/2 Minutes, 10 Bullets	2015	Marc Silver	Carolyn Hepburn, Minette Nelson
3 Minute Hug, A	2019	Everardo González	
4	2007	Tim Slade	Joanna Buggy and Tim Slade
4-Cylinder 400	2004	Harlo Bray, John B. Finn, Garret Savage	John B. Finn
4 Little Girls	1997	Spike Lee	Spike Lee and Sam Pollard
5 Broken Cameras	2011	Emad Burnat, Guy Davidi	Christine Camdessus, Serge Gordey, Emad Burnat, Guy Davidi
6-18-67	1969	George Lucas	
65_Redroses	2009	Philip Lyall, Nimisha Mukerji	Philip Lyall, Nimisha Mukerji, John Ritchie
6th Marine Division on Okinawa	1945	N/A	United States Marine Corps
7 Beats per Minute	2024	Yuqi Kang	
7 Walks with Mark Brown	2024	Pierre Creton, Vincent Barré	Arnaud Dommerc
7/7 Ripple Effect	2007	John Hill	
8: The Mormon Proposition	2010	Reed Cowan, Steven Greenstreet	Reed Cowan, Steven Greenstreet, Christopher Reece-Volz, Emily Pearson
9 Days in Summer	1967	Philip Bond	Norman Vigars
9 to 5: Days in Porn	2008	Jens Hoffmann	Cleonice Comino
9/10: The Final Hours	2014	Erik Nelson	Amy Briamonte
9/11	2002	Jules and Gédéon Naudet, James Hanlon	Tom Forman, Jules Naudet, Gédéon Naudet, James Hanlon
9-11: American Reflections	2001	Shireen Kadivar	
9/11: Inside the President's War Room	2021	Adam Wishart	Simon Finch, Serena Kennedy
9/11 Kids	2020	Elizabeth St. Philip	Elizabeth St. Philip, Steve Gamester
9/11: Press for Truth	2006	Ray Nowosielski	John Duffy
9/11: The Twin Towers	2006	Richard Dale	
10 Billion: What's on Your Plate?	2015	Valentin Thurn	Valentin Thurn
10 MPH	2007	Hunter Weeks	Hunter Weeks and Josh Caldwell
10 on Ten	2004	Abbas Kiarostami	Abbas Kiarostami, Marin Karmitz
10 Questions for the Dalai Lama	2006	Rick Ray	Rick Ray and Sharon Ray
11th Hour, The	2007	Nadia Conners and Leila Conners Petersen	Chuck Castleberry, Leonardo DiCaprio, Brian Gerber, and Leila Conners Petersen
12 Angry Lebanese: The Documentary	2009	Zeina Daccache	Zeina Daccache
12 O'Clock Boys	2013	Lotfy Nathan	
12th & Delaware	2010	Rachel Grady	
13th	2016	Ava DuVernay	Ava DuVernay, Spencer Averick, Howard Barish
14 Peaks: Nothing Is Impossible	2021	Torquil Jones	John McKenna, Barry Smith, Drew Masters
14 Women	2007	Mary Lambert	Nicole Boxer, Sharon Oreck
14th	2026	Ava DuVernay	Ava DuVernay, Paul Garnes, Spencer Averick, Tammy Garnes
16 Acres	2012	Richard Hankin	Matt Kapp, Mike Marcucci
16 Days in Afghanistan	2008	Anwar Hajher	Mithaq Kazimi
16 Shots	2019	Richard Rowley	Jacqueline Soohen, Jamie Kalven, Karim Hajj
24 Hours on Craigslist	2004	Michael Ferris Gibson	Michael Ferris Gibson
24 x 24: Wide Open with Jeff Gordon	2007	Randy Martin	
40 Years of Rocky: The Birth of a Classic	2020	Derek Wayne Johnson	Derek Wayne Johnson, Chris May, Emmett James
41	2007	Christian de Rezendes, Christian O'Neill	Christian de Rezendes, Christian O'Neill
50 Children: The Rescue Mission of Mr. and Mrs. Kraus	2013	Steven Pressman	Steven Pressman
51 Birch Street	2005	Doug Block	Doug Block and Lori Cheatle
69: The Saga of Danny Hernandez	2020	Vikram Gandhi	Jeremy Falson, Vikram Gandhi, Jude Harris
73 Cows	2018	Alex Lockwood	Alex Lockwood
76 Days	2020	Hao Wu, Weixi Chen, Anonymous	Hao Wu, Jean Tsien
78/52	2017	Alexandre O. Philippe	Kerry Deignan Roy
80 Blocks From Tiffany's	1983	Gary Weis	Gary Weis
81st Blow, The	1974	David Bergman, Jacques Ehrlich, Haim Gouri	David Bergman, Jacques Ehrlich, Haim Gouri, Beit Lohamei HaGhettaot
102 Minutes that Changed America	2008		Nicole Rittenmeyer
130 Children	2022	Ainara Aparici	Ainara Aparici, Daniela Camino
199 Lives: The Travis Pastrana Story	2008	Gregg Godfrey	
299 Queen Street West	2023	Sean Menard	Sean Menard, Molly Ye
306 Hollywood	2018	Jonathan and Elan Bogarín	
499	2020	Rodrigo Reyes	Inti Cordera, Andrew Houchens
500 Days in the Wild	2023	Dianne Whelan	Betsy Carson
500 Dunam on the Moon	2002	Rachel Leah Jones	
500 Years Later	2005	Owen 'Alik Shahadah	Owen 'Alik Shahadah, Ako Oseyaba Mitchell
638 Ways to Kill Castro	2006	Dollan Cannell	Kari Lia
911: In Plane Site	2006	William Lewis	Dave vonKleist and William Lewis
2000 Meters to Andriivka	2025	Mstyslav Chernov	Mstyslav Chernov, Michelle Mizner, Raney Aronson-Rath
2000 Mules	2022	Dinesh D'Souza	Dinesh D'Souza
2016: Obama's America	2012	Dinesh D'Souza, John Sullivan	Gerald R. Molen, Doug Sain
2073	2024	Asif Kapadia	George Chignell, Asif Kapadia
3000 Miles	2007	Maximillion Cooper	Antony Adel, Patrick Fischer, Barnaby Girling
3100: Run and Become	2018	Sanjay Rawal	Tanya Meillier, Alexander Meillier, Sanjay Rawal
4192: The Crowning of the Hit King	2010	Terry Lukemire	Aymie Majerski
20,000 Days on Earth	2014	Iain Forsyth, Jane Pollard	Dan Bowen, Alex Dunnett, James Wilson
£830,000,000 – Nick Leeson and the Fall of the House of Barings	1996	Adam Curtis	Adam Curtis

== A ==
† = Series

Title	Year	Director(s)	Producer(s)
A	1998	Tatsuya Mori	Takaharu Yasuoka
À la découverte de l'Aïd al-Adha	2014	Farid Dms Debah	
Aardvark'd: 12 Weeks with Geeks	2005	Lerone D. Wilson	
ABC Africa	2001	Abbas Kiarostami	
ABC of Love and Sex, The: Australia Style	1978	John D. Lamond	John D. Lamond
Abducted in Plain Sight	2017	Skye Borgman	Skye Borgman, Emily Kincaid, Stephanie Tobey
Abduction: The Megumi Yokota Story	2006	Patty Kim and Chris Sheridan	Patty Kim and Chris Sheridan
Abolitionists, The	2016	Darrin Fletcher, Chet Thomas	McKay Daines, Darrin Fletcher, Chet Thomas
About Baghdad	2004	Sinan Antoon, Bassam Haddad, Maya Mikdashi, Suzy Salamy, and Adam Shapiro	Incounter Productions
Absolute Proof	2021	Mike Lindell	Mike Lindell, Brannon Howse, Mary Fanning
Aching Heart	2007	Oscar Hedin	
Act Normal	2006	Olaf de Fleur	
Act of Conscience, An	1997	Robbie Leppzer	Turning Tide Productions
Act of God	2009	Jennifer Baichwal	Jennifer Baichwal, Nicholas de Pencier, Daniel Iron, Issa Zaroui
Act of Seeing with One's Own Eyes, The	1971	Stan Brakhage	
Action: The October Crisis of 1970	1973	Robin Spry	Tom Daly, Normand Cloutier, Robin Spry
Active Measures	2018	Jack Bryan	Jack Bryan, Marley Clements, Laura DuBois
Adam Clayton Powell	1989	Richard Kilberg	
Adrianne and the Castle	2024	Shannon Walsh	Ina Fichman
Adventures in Voice Acting	2008	Eric P. Sherman	Kristi Reed
Adventures of a Brown Man in Search of Civilization	1972	James Ivory	Anthony Korner, Ismail Merchant
Advocate	2019	Rachel Leah Jones and Philippe Bellaiche	Home Docs
Adwa - An African Victory	1999	Haile Gerima	
Affaire Chebeya	2012	Thierry Michel	Les Films de la Passerelle
Afghantsi	1988	Peter Kosminsky	Peter Kosminsky
Africa	2013	Katrina Bartlam	Hugh Pearson
Africa Addio	1966	Gualtiero Jacopetti, Franco Prosperi	Angelo Rizzoli
African Independence	2013	Tukufu Zuberi	Tukufu Zuberi
Afrique 50	1950	René Vautier	
Afro@Digital	2002	Balufu Bakupa-Kanyinda	N'Diagne Adechoubou
Afro-American Work Songs in a Texas Prison	1966	Toshi Seeger	
After Death	2023	Stephen Gray, Chris Radtke	Jason Pamer, Jens Jacob
After Innocence	2005	Jessica Sanders	Jessica Sanders, Marc H. Simon
After Maria	2019	Nadia Hallgren	
After Party, The: The Last Party 3	2011	Michael Schiller	
After Porn Ends	2012	Bryce Wagoner	
After the Raid	2019	Rodrigo Reyes	
After Winter, Spring	2012	Judith Lit	Judith Lit
Age of Disclosure, The	2025	Dan Farah	Dan Farah
Age of Stupid, The	2009	Franny Armstrong	Lizzie Gillett
Agee	1980	Ross Spears	
Agronomist, The	2003	Jonathan Demme	Edwidge Danticat
Aileen Wuornos: The Selling of a Serial Killer	1994	Nick Broomfield and Joan Churchill	Riete Oord
Aileen: Life and Death of a Serial Killer	2003	Nick Broomfield	Jo Human
Air Force, Incorporated	2006	Enrique Piñeyro	Enrique Piñeyro
Al Franken: God Spoke	2006	Nick Doob, Chris Hegedus	Rebecca Marshall, Frazer Pennebaker
Al otro lado	2005	Natalia Almada	Natalia Almada
Al-Qaeda's New Front	2005	Ruthie Calarco, Neil Docherty	
Alaska Wilderness Lake	1971	Alan Landsburg	
Albert Brooks: Defending My Life	2023	Rob Reiner	Matthew George, Michele Singer, and Rob Reiner
Albert Fish	2007	John Borowski	John Borowski
Alexander the Great †	2014	Christian Twente, Martin Carazo Mendez	
Alfredo's Fire	2014	Andy Abrahams Wilson	
Alice: Ignorance Is Bliss	2014	Thomas McNaught	Thomas McNaught
Alien Boy: The Life and Death of James Chasse	2013	Brian Lindstrom	Jason Renaud, Brian Lindstrom, Andrew Saunderson
Aliens of the Deep	2005	James Cameron and Steven Quale	James Cameron and Andrew Wight
Alipato at Muog	2024	JL Burgos	
Alive: 20 Years Later	1993	Jill Fullerton-Smith	Jill Fullerton-Smith
All Aboard! Rosie's Family Cruise	2006	Shari Cookson	Shari Cookson
All About the Money	2026	Sinéad O'Shea	Sinéad O'Shea, Claire McCabe, Harry Vaughn, Katie Holly, Sigrid Dyekjær
All American High	1987	Keva Rosenfeld	Linda Maron, Keva Rosenfeld
All Hell Broke Loose	1995	Amir Feldman	Amir Feldman
All I Can Say	2019	Shannon Hoon, Danny Clinch, Taryn Gould, Colleen Hennessy	Lindha Narvaez, Taryn Gould, Samuel Gursky
All In: The Fight for Democracy	2020	Liz Garbus, Lisa Cortés	Liz Garbus, Lisa Cortés, Dan Cogan, Stacey Abrams
All in My Family	2019	Hao Wu	
All in This Tea	2007	Les Blank and Gina Leibrecht	Les Blank and Gina Leibrecht
All of Me	2014	Alexandra Lescaze	Alexandra Lescaze
All Power to the People	1996	Lee Lew-Lee	Lee Lew-Lee
All That Breathes	2022	Shaunak Sen	Shaunak Sen, Aman Mann, Teddy Leifer
All the Beauty and the Bloodshed	2022	Laura Poitras	Laura Poitras, Nan Goldin, Yoni Golijov, Clare Carter, John Lyons, Howard Gertler
All the Time in the World	2014	Suzanne Crocker	Suzanne Crocker
All the Walls Came Down	2025	Ondi Timoner	Ondi Timoner, Eli O. Timoner, Maggie Contreras
Almost Sunrise	2016	Michael Collins	Marty Syjuco
Alone across Australia	2004	Ian Darling and Jon Muir	Ian Darling and Jon Muir
AlphaGo	2017	Greg Kohs	Gary Krieg, Kevin Proudfoot, Josh Rosen
The Alpinist	2021	Peter Mortimer and Nick Rosen	
Altar Boy, the Priest and the Gardener, The	2025	Juan Manuel Fernández	Karina Blanco, Juan Manuel Fernández
Apolonia, Apolonia	2022	Lea Glob	Sidsel Lønvig Siersted, Malgorzata Staron
Altars of the World	1976	Lew Ayres	
Altman	2014	Ron Mann	Ron Mann, Bill Imperial
Am I Racist?	2024	Justin Folk	Justin Folk, Charlotte Roland, Brian Hoffman, Matt Walsh
Ama Girls	1958	Ben Sharpsteen	Ben Sharpsteen, Walt Disney
Amanda Knox	2016	Rod Blackhurst, Brian McGinn	Rod Blackhurst, Mette Heide, Brian McGinn, Stephen Robert Morse
Amarillo by Morning	1997	Spike Jonze	
AmaZulu: The Children of Heaven	2006	Hannan Majid, Richard York	Denise York
America Betrayed	2008	Leslie Carde	Indira Chatterjee
America: Freedom to Fascism	2006	Aaron Russo	Aaron Russo and Richard Whitley
America: Imagine the World Without Her	2014	Dinesh D'Souza, John Sullivan	Dinesh D'Souza, Gerald R. Molen
America's Burning	2024	David Smick	Ian Michaels
America's Great Divide: From Obama to Trump	2020	Michael Kirk	Michael Kirk, Mike Wiser, Philip Bennett, Jim Gilmore, Gabrielle Schonder
America's Heart and Soul	2004	Louis Schwartzberg	Vincent Ueber
America's Most Hated Family in Crisis	2011	Emma Cooper	Emma Cooper, Nick Mirsky
American Anarchist	2016	Charlie Siskel	Charlie Siskel
American Beer	2002	Paul Kermizian	Paul Kermizian
American Bellydancer	2005	Jonathan Brandeis	Jonathan Brandeis
American Circumcision	2017	Brendon Marotta	Marilyn Milos, Georganne Chapin, Andrew Freedman, Edgar Schoen, Brian Morris, Jonathan Conte
American: The Bill Hicks Story	2009	Matt Harlock, Paul Thomas	
American Dharma	2018	Errol Morris	Errol Morris, Steven Hathaway, Marie Savare, P.J. van Sandwijk, Robert Fernandez
American Dream	1990	Barbara Kopple	Arthur Cohn and Barbara Kopple
American Dream/American Knightmare	2018	Antoine Fuqua	
American Drug War: The Last White Hope	2007	Kevin Booth	Sacred Cow
American Factory	2019	Steven Bognar, Julia Reichert	Jeff Reichert, Julie Parker Benello
American Fugitive: The Truth About Hassan	2006	Jean-Daniel Lafond	Nathalie Barton
American Game, The	1979	Jay Freund, David Wolf	Anthony Jones, Peter Powell, Robert Kenner
American Gangster, The	1992	Ben Burtt	Ray Herbeck Jr
American Gospel†	2018	Brandon Kimber	Brandon Kimber
American Grindhouse	2010	Elijah Drenner	Elijah Drenner
American Hardcore	2006	Paul Rachman	Steven Blush and Paul Rachman
American Harmony	2008	Aengus James	Aengus James and Colin King Miller
American Jobs	2004	Greg Spotts	Greg Spotts
American Meme, The	2018	Bert Marcus	Bert Marcus, Cassandra Thornton
American Mormon	2005	Jed Knudsen	Daryn Tufts, Jed Knudsen
American Mosque, An	2012	David Washburn	David Washburn
American Movie	1999	Chris Smith	Sarah Price
American Murder: The Family Next Door	2020	Jenny Popplewell	James Marsh
American Nightmare, The	2000	Adam Simon	Paula Jalfon, Colin McCabe, Jonathan Sehring
American Opera, An: The Greatest Pet Rescue Ever!	2007	Tom McPhee	Tom McPhee
American Pachuco: The Legend of Luis Valdez	2026	David Alvarado	David Alvarado, Lauren DeFilippo, Everett Katigbak, Amanda Pollak
American Pimp	1999	Albert Hughes and Allen Hughes	Albert Hughes, Allen Hughes, and Kevin J. Messick
American Radical: The Trials of Norman Finkelstein	2009	David Ridgen, Nicolas Rossier	David Ridgen, Nicolas Rossier
American Revolution 2	1969	Howard Alk	Mike Gray
American Ruling Class, The	2005	John Kirby	Libby Handros
American Scary	2006	John E. Hudgens	Sandy Clark
American Sons	2025	Andrew James Gonzales	Elizabeth Avellan, Andrew James Gonzales, Ray Telles, Laura Varela
American Symphony	2023	Matthew Heineman	Matthew Heineman, Lauren Domino, Joedan Okun
American Teen	2008	Nanette Burstein	Nanette Burstein, Chris Huddleston, Eli Gonda, Jordan Roberts
American Tongues	1988	Louis Alvarez, Andrew Kolker	Louis Alvarez, Andrew Kolker
American Zeitgeist	2006	Rob McGann	Rob McGann
Amina Profile, The	2015	Sophie Deraspe	Isabelle Couture, Nathalie Cloutier
Amy	2015	Asif Kapadia	James Gay Rees, George Pank, and Paul Bell
Anderson Platoon, The	1967	Pierre Schoendoerffer	
André Is an Idiot	2025	Tony Benna	Joshua Altman, Ben Cotner, Stelio Kitrilakis, André Ricciardi, Tory Tunnell
André the Giant	2018	Jason Hehir	Bill Simmons, Matt Maxson, Jacob Rogal, Rick Bernstein
Andrew and Jeremy Get Married	2004	Don Boyd	Clare Boyd and Don Boyd
Anelka: Misunderstood	2020	Franck Nataf	
Angelmakers, The	2005	Astrid Bussink	Astrid Bussink
Angkor : la forêt de pierre	2002	Jean-Claude Lubtchansky	Jean-Pierre Gibrat
Animal World, The	1956	Irwin Allen	Irwin Allen
Animals Film, The	1981	Victor Schonfeld, Myriam Alaux	Victor Schonfeld, Myriam Alaux
Anna Nicole Smith: You Don't Know Me	2023	Ursula Macfarlane	Alexandra Lacey
Anne Frank Remembered	1995	Jon Blair	Jon Blair
Answering the Call: Ground Zero's Volunteers	2006	Lou Angeli	Bunny Dubin
Anthrax War	2009	Bob Coen	Bob Coen, Natalie Dubois, Christine Le Goff, Eric Nadler
Anthropocene: The Human Epoch	2018	Jennifer Baichwal, Nicholas de Pencier, Edward Burtynsky	
Antoine Griezmann: The Making of a Legend	2019	Alex Dell	
Antonia: A Portrait of the Woman	1974	Judy Collins, Jill Godmilow	
Antonio Gaudi	1984	Hiroshi Teshigahara	
Antiheroine	2026	James Hall, Edward Lovelace	Melanie Archer, Jon Lullo, Julia Nottingham, Hattie Bridges Webb
Anti-Semitism in the 21st Century: The Resurgence	2007	Andrew Goldberg	Andrew Goldberg
Anvil! The Story of Anvil	2008	Sacha Gervasi	
Any Other Way: The Jackie Shane Story	2024	Michael Mabbott, Lucah Rosenberg-Lee	Amanda Burt, Sam Dunn, Michael Mabbott, Scot McFadyen, Justine Pimlott
APEX: The Story of the Hypercar	2015	J.F. Musial and Josh Vietze	Katherina Gaccione
Apocalypse in the Tropics	2024	Petra Costa	Petra Costa, Alessandra Orofino
Apollo 11	2019	Todd Douglas Miller	Todd Douglas Miller, Thomas Petersen, Evan Krauss
Apology to Elephants, An	2013	Amy Schatz	Amy Schatz, Beth Aala
Aquarela	2018	Viktor Kossakovsky	Heino Deckert, Sigrid Dyekjær, Aimara Reques
Arakimentari	2004	Travis Klose	Jason Fried
Arc of Life, The	2012	Jon Monday	Jon Monday
Architecture of Doom, The	1989	Peter Cohen	Peter Cohen
Are the Kids Alright?	2003	Ellen Spiro	Karen Bernstein
Are We Good?	2025	Steven Feinartz	Steven Feinartz, Ethan Goldman, Julie Seabaugh
Are You Proud?	2019	Ashley Joiner	Dan Cleland
Arirang	2011	Ki-duk Kim	
Aristocrats, The	2005	Paul Provenza	Paul Provenza and Peter Adam Golden
Arlington West: The Film	2006	Peter Dudar and Sally Marr	Peter Dudar and Sally Marr
Armed Only with a Camera: The Life and Death of Brent Renaud	2025	Brent Renaud, Craig Renaud	Brent Renaud, Craig Renaud, Juan Arredondo
Army of Women, An	2024	Julie Lunde Lillesæter	Natalya Sarch, Arne Dahr, Julie Lunde Lillesæter
Aroused	2013	Deborah Anderson	Deborah Anderson, Christopher Gallo, Mike Moz
Art and Remembrance: The Legacy of Felix Nussbaum	1993	Barbara Pfeffer	Barbara Pfeffer
Art Bastard	2016	Victor Kanefsky	Chris T. Concannon
Art for Everybody	2023	Miranda Yousef	Morgan Neville, Tim Rummel
Art Is... The Permanent Revolution	2012	Manfred Kirchheimer	Manfred Kirchheimer
Art of the Game, The	2014	Matthew Davis Walker	Ryan Lynch
Art Spiegelman: Disaster Is My Muse	2024	Molly Bernstein, Philip Dolin	Molly Bernstein, Philip Dolin, Sam Jinishian, Alicia Sams
Article VI	2008	Jack Donaldson, Bryan Hall	Reed Dickens, John Carosella, Bryan Hall, Jack Donaldson
Artie Shaw: Time Is All You've Got	1986	Brigitte Berman	
Ashes, the Movie	2025	Antonio Rodríguez Romaní	Antonio Rodríguez Romaní
Ashkenaz	2007	Rachel Leah Jones	
Ask E. Jean	2025	Ivy Meeropol	Ivy Meeropol, Laura Bickford, Annabelle Dunne
Asog	2023	Seán Devlin	Seán Devlin
Assassination of Russia	2002	Jean-Charles Deniau, Charles Gazelle	
Assassins	2020	Ryan White	Ryan White, Jessica Hargrave
Assault in the Ring	2008	Eric Drath	Eric Drath, Jenna Rosher
Astronauts Gone Wild: Investigation Into the Authenticity of the Moon Landings	2004	Bart Sibrel	Bart Sibrel
At Night, They Dance	2011	Isabelle Lavigne and Stéphane Thibault	
At the Death House Door	2008	Peter Gilbert, Steve James	Peter Gilbert, Steve James
At the Edge of the World	2008	Dan Stone	Dan Stone
Atari: Game Over	2014	Zak Penn	
Athlete A	2020	Bonni Cohen, Jon Shenk	Serin Marshall, Jennifer Sey, Julie Parker Benello
Atman	1997	Pirjo Honkasalo	
Atomic Ed and the Black Hole	2002	Ellen Spiro	Karen Bernstein
Attack of Life: The Bang Tango Movie	2016	Drew Fortier	Howard Benson, Joe Placzkowski, Anu Gunn, Drew Fortier
Audible	2021	Matthew Ogens	Geoff McLean
Audience of One	2007	Michael Jacobs	Michael Jacobs, Zach Sanders, Matt Woods
Audrey	2020	Helena Coan	Nick Taussig, Paul Van Carter, Annabel Wigoder
Audrie & Daisy	2016	Bonni Cohen, Jon Shenk	Richard Berge, Bonni Cohen, Sara Dosa
Austerlitz	2016	Sergei Loznitsa	
Australia After Dark	1975	John D. Lamond	John D. Lamond
Autism: The Musical	2007	Tricia Regan	Tricia Regan, Sasha Alpert, Perrin Chiles
Automat, The	2021	Lisa Hurwitz	Lisa Hurwitz
Autobiography of Nicolae Ceaușescu, The	2010	Andrei Ujică	Velvet Moraru
Avicii – I'm Tim	2024	Henrik Burman	Björn Tjärnberg
Awake: The Life of Yogananda	2014	Paola di Florio, Lisa Leeman	Peter Rader
Awake Zion	2005	Monica Haim	
Ayn Rand: A Sense of Life	1997	Michael Paxton	

== B ==
† = Series

Title	Year	Director(s)	Producer(s)
Babenco: Tell Me When I Die	2019	Bárbara Paz	Myra Babenco, Bárbara Paz
Back in Time	2015	Jason Aron	Lee Leshen
Back of Beyond, The	1954	John Heyer	John Heyer
Back to Babylon	2002	Abbas Fahdel	Blanche Guichou
Backstreet Boys: Show 'Em What You're Made Of	2015	Stephen Kijak	Mia Bays
Backward Class, The	2014	Madeleine Grant	
Backyard, The	2002	Paul Hough	Paul Hough
Bacio di Tosca, Il	1984	Daniel Schmid	
Bad 25	2012	Spike Lee	
Bad Kids, The	2016	Keith Fulton, Lou Pepe	Keith Fulton, Molly O’Brien
Bad Neighbor	2020	Ricardo Jara	Ricardo Jara, Marcela Nieto
Baghdad ER	2006	Jon Alpert	Jon Alpert and Matthew O'Neill
Bald: The Making of THX 1138	1971	George Lucas	
Balinese Trance Seance, A	1979	Tim Asch	
Ball Game, The	1898		Edison Manufacturing Company
Ballad of Esequiel Hernandez, The	2007	Kieran Fitzgerald	Michael Fitzgerald, Brendan Fitzgerald
Bam 6.6	2007	Jahangir Golestan-Parast	Jahangir Golestan-Parast
Bananas!*	2009	Fredrik Gertten	Margarete Jangård, Lise Lense-Møller, Bart Simpson
Bananas Unpeeled	2000	Nick Shaw	
Banaz: A Love Story	2012	Deeyah Khan	Deeyah
Band Called Death, A	2012	Mark Christopher Covino, Jeff Howlett	Mark Christopher Covino, Jeff Howlett, Jerry Ferrara, Kevin Mann, Matthew Perniciaro, Scott Mosier
Band of Sisters	2012	Mary Fishman	Mary Fishman
Bang My Box: The Robin Byrd Story	2026	Jyllian Gunther, Stephanie Schwam	Jyllian Gunther, Stephanie Schwam, Sarah Jessica Parker, Alison Benson, Caroline Waterlow
Bangkok Girl	2005	Jordan Clark	Jordan Clark
Banking on Heaven	2005	Dot Reidelbach	Laurie Allen
Baraka	1992	Ron Fricke	
Barbara Forever	2026	Brydie O'Connor	Elijah Stevens, Brydie O'Connor, Claire Edelman
Barbara Walters: Tell Me Everything	2025	Jackie Jesko	Jackie Jesko, Marcella Steingart, Sara Bernstein, Meredith Kaulfers
Barefoot to Herat	2002	Majid Majidi	Majid Majidi and Fouad Nahas
Barista	2015	Rock Baijnauth	Rock Baijnauth, Andrew Moniz, Jimmy Nguyen, Jason Rose, Ramona Serletic, Roger Singh
Baristas	2019	Rock Baijnauth	Rock Baijnauth, Jawad Mir, George Nikitaras, Ramona Serletic, Roger Singh, Rita Su
Barolo Boys: The Story of a Revolution	2014	Paolo Casalis, Tiziano Gaia	
Baseball Punx	2017	Jak Kerley	Jak Kerley, Taber Allen
Bastards of the Party	2005	Cle Shaheed Sloan	Antoine Fuqua
Batas Militar	1997	Kara Magsanoc-Alikpala	
Batkid Begins	2015	Dana Nachman	Dana Nachman, Liza Meak
Girls Don't Cry, BNK48	2018	Ter Nawapol Thamrongrattanarit	Vichai Matakul, Patcharin Surawattanapongs
Battered Bastards of Baseball, The	2014	Chapman Way, Maclain Way	Juliana Lembi
Battle for L.A., The: Footsoldiers, Vol. 1	2004	Darren Doane	Darren Doane, Shane C. Drake, Dax Reynosa
Battle for the Tiara	1998	Charley Lang and Eric Schiff	Charley Lang and Eric Schiff
Battle for Whiteclay, The	2008	Mark Vasina	
Battle of San Pietro, The	1945	John Huston	John Huston (uncredited)
Battle of the Harvests, The	1942	Stanley Jackson	James Beveridge
Battle Over Citizen Kane, The	1996	Michael Epstein, Thomas Lennon	Michael Epstein, Thomas Lennon
Be Water	2020	Bao Nguyen	Julia Nottingham, Bao Nguyen, Gentry Kirby, Erin Leyden, Adam Neuhaus
Beach Boys, The	2024	Frank Marshall, Thom Zimmy	Frank Marshall, Irving Azoff, Nicholas Ferrall, Jeanne Elfant Festa, Aly Parker
Beaches of Agnès, The	2008	Agnès Varda	Agnès Varda
Beatles '64	2024	David Tedeschi	Martin Scorsese, Margaret Bodde
Beatles: The First U.S. Visit, The	1994	Kathy Dougherty, Albert Maysles, and Susan Frömke (as Susan Froemke)	Susan Frömke (as Susan Froemke)
Beats of the Antonov	2014	Hajooj Kuka	
Beautiful Losers	2007	Aaron Rose	Rich Lim, Jon Barlow, Chris Green, and Noah Khoshbin
Beautiful Planet, A	2016	Toni Myers	Toni Myers
The Beautiful Game	2012	Victor Buhler	Julian Cautherley, Jason Christopher Mercer, Tom Mickel, Dylan Voogt
Becoming	2020	Nadia Hallgren	Katy Chevigny, Marilyn Ness, Lauren Cioffi
Becoming Led Zeppelin	2025	Bernard MacMahon	Ged Doherty, Duke Erikson, Bernard MacMahon, Allison McGourty
Bedlam	2019	Kenneth Paul Rosenberg	Kenneth Paul Rosenberg, Peter Miller
Beer Wars	2009	Anat Baron	Anat Baron
Beetle Queen Conquers Tokyo	2009	Jessica Oreck	Jessica Oreck, Akito Y. Kawahara, Maiko Endo
Before the Last Curtain Falls	2014	Thomas Wallner	Kerstin Meyer-Beetz
Before the Mountain Was Moved	1970	Robert K. Sharpe	Robert K. Sharpe
Before We Forget	2011	Jeremy Boo, Lee Xian Jie	Jeremy Boo, Lee Xian Jie
Behind "The Cove": The Quiet Japanese Speak Out	2015	Yagi Keiko	Yagi Keiko
Behind the Curve	2018	Daniel J. Clark	Caroline Clark, Nick Andert, Daniel J. Clark
Behind the Mask: The Story of the People Who Risk Everything to Save Animals	2006	Shannon Keith	Shannon Keith
Behind the Mist	2023	Sebastián Cordero	Sebastián Cordero, José Cardoso
Being Canadian	2015	Robert Cohen	Colin Keith Gray, Megan Raney Aarons
Being Eddie	2025	Angus Wall	John Davis, John Fox, Charisse M. Hewitt, Kent Kubena, Terry Leonard
Being Mary Tyler Moore	2023	James Adolphus	James Adolphus, Debra Martin Chase, Lena Waithe
Being Osama	2004	Mahmoud Kaabour, Tim Schwab	
Believer	2018	Don Argott	Sheena M. Joyce, Heather Parry, Robert Reynolds
Belle from Gaza, The	2024	Yolande Zauberman	Bruno Nahon, Yolande Zauberman
Bells from the Deep: Faith and Superstition in Russia	1993	Werner Herzog	Lucki Stipetic, Ira Barmak, Alessandro Cecconi
Berlin Babylon	2001	Hubertus Siegert	Hubertus Siegert
Besa: The Promise	2012	Rachel Goslins	
Best Friend Forgotten	2004	Julie Lofton	Julie Lofton
Best Worst Movie	2009	Michael Stephenson	Lindsay Stephenson, Brad Klopman, Jim Klopman, Michael Stephenson
Bestiaire	2012	Denis Côté	Denis Côté, Sylvain Corbeil
Better Go Mad in the Wild	2025	Miro Remo	Miro Remo, Tomáš Hrubý
Better Man, A	2017	Attiya Khan, Lawrence Jackman	Christine Kleckner, Justine Pimlott
Better This World	2011	Kelly Duane, Katie Galloway	
Bettie Page Reveals All	2012	Mark Mori	Mark Mori, Thorpe Mori
Between Rings	2014	Jesse Chisi, Salla Sorri	
Before Stonewall, After Stonewall †	1984–1999	Greta Schiller and John Scagliotti	Greta Schiller, Robert Rosenberg, Janet Baus, and Dan Hunt
Before the Music Dies	2006	Andrew Shapter	Joel Rasmussen
Below the Clouds	2025	Gianfranco Rosi	Donatella Palermo, Gianfranco Rosi, Paolo Del Brocco
Beltracchi: The Art of Forgery	2014	Arne Birkenstock	
Belushi	2020	R. J. Cutler	R. J. Cutler, John Battsek, Diane Becker, and Trevor Smith
Best Boy	1979	Ira Wohl	Only Child Motion Pictures
Best of Enemies	2015	Robert Gordon and Morgan Neville	Julie Gordon, Clif Phillips and Caryn Capotosto
Best Worst Movie	2009	Michael Stephenson	Lindsay Stephenson, Brad Klopman, Jim Klopman, Michael Stephenson
Betrayal – Nerakhoon, The	2008	Ellen Kuras, Thavisouk Phrasavath	
Beware the Slenderman	2016	Irene Taylor Brodsky	Sophie Harris, Irene Taylor Brodsky
Beyond and Back	1978	James L. Conway	Charles E. Sellier Jr.
Beyond Belief	2007	Beth Murphy	Beth Murph
Beyond Clueless	2014	Charlie Lyne	Anthony Ing, Billy Boyd Cape, Charlie Lyne, Catherine Bray
Beyond Conviction	2006	Rachel Libert	Rachel Libert, Jedd Wider, Todd Wider
Beyond Hatred	2005	Olivier Meyrou	Christophe Girard and Katharina Marx
Beyond Right and Wrong	2012	Roger Spottiswoode, Lekha Singh	Lekha Singh, Rebecca Chaiklin
Beyond the Call	2006	Adrian Belic	Adrian Belic
Beyond the Game	2008	Jos de Putter	Wink de Putter
Beyond the Gates of Splendor	2004	Jim Hanon	Kevin McAfee
Beyond the Heights	2015	Jawad Sharif	Mirza Ali
Beyond the Mat	1999	Barry W. Blaustein	Barry W. Blaustein, Barry Bloom, Brian Grazer, Ron Howard, Michael Rosenberg
Beyond This Place	2010	Kaleo La Belle	
Beyond Utopia	2023	Madeleine Gavin	Jana Edelbaum, Rachel Cohen, Sue Mi Terry
Bible's Buried Secrets, The	2008		
Bicycle Dreams	2009	Stephen Auerbach	
Big Boys Gone Bananas!*	2011	Fredrik Gertten	Margarete Jangård
Big Buy, The: Tom DeLay's Stolen Congress	2006	Mark Birnbaum, Jim Schermbeck	Mark Birnbaum, Jim Schermbeck
Big Cheese, The	2025	Sara Joe Wolansky	James A. Smith, Sara Joe Wolansky
Big Dreamers	2007	Camille Hardman	Camille Hardman and John Fink
Big Meeting, The	2019	Daniel Draper	Christie Allanson, Daniel Draper
Big Melt, The	2013	Martin Wallace	Crossover and Lone Star
Big Men	2014	Rachel Boynton	Rachel Boynton, Brad Pitt
Big One, The	1998	Michael Moore	Kathleen Glynn
Bigger Than Us	2021	Flore Vasseur	Denis Carot, Flore Vasseur, Marion Cotillard
Biggest Little Farm, The	2018	John Chester	Sandra Keats, John Chester
Biggie and Tupac	2002	Nick Broomfield	Nick Broomfield and Michele d'Acosta
Bikram: Yogi, Guru, Predator	2019	Eva Orner	
Bill Murray Stories: Life Lessons Learned from a Mythical Man, The	2018	Tommy Avallone	Raymond Esposito, Max Paolucci, Derrick Kunzer, Kevin Sisti Jr.
Bill Nye: Science Guy	2017	David Alvarado, Jason Sussberg	Seth Gordon, Kate McLean, Nick Pampenella
Bill W.	2012	Dan Carracino, Kevin Hanlon	Dan Carracino
Billion Dollar Bully	2019	Kaylie Milliken	Kaylie Milliken, Mellissa Wood
Birders	2019	Otilia Portillo Padua	
Birds of War	2026	Janay Boulos, Abd Alkader Habak	Sonja Henrici, Janay Boulos, Abd Alkader Habak
Birth of a Community: Jews and the Gold Rush	1994	Bill Chayes	
Birth of a Movement	2017	Bestor Cram, Susan Gray	Bestor Cram, Susan Gray, Matthew Maclean
Birth of Saké, The	2015	Erik Shirai	Masako Tsumura
Birth of the Living Dead	2012	Rob Kuhns	Rob Kuhns, Esther Cassidy
Bite of China, A: Celebrating the Chinese New Year	2016	Chen Lei, Deng Jie, Li Yong	
Bitter Honey	2014	Robert Lemelson	Robert Lemelson, Alessandra Pasquino
Bitter Jester	2003	Maija Di Giorgio	Kenneth Simmons
Bitter Seeds	2011	Micha Peled	Micha Peled
Bituminous Coal Queens of Pennsylvania, The	2005	David Hunt, Jody Eldred	Patricia Heaton
Black Barbie: A Documentary	2023	Lagueria Davis	Lagueria Davis, Aaliyah Williams
Black Box BRD	2001	Andres Veiel	Pepe Danquart, Erich Lackner, Mirjam Quinte
Black Chicks Talking	2001	Leah Purcell	
Black Fox: The Rise and Fall of Adolf Hitler	1962	Louis Clyde Stoumen	Louis Clyde Stoumen
Black Godfather, The	2019	Reginald Hudlin	Nicole Avant, Nelson George, Byron Phillips, Caitrin Rogers
Black Gold	2006	Marc James Francis, Nick Francis	Christopher Hird, Marc Francis, Nick Francis
Black Ice	2022	Hubert Davis	Vinay Virmani
Black October	2000	Terence McKenna	Stephen Phizicky
Black Panthers	1968	Agnès Varda	
Black Panthers: Vanguard of the Revolution, The	2015	Stanley Nelson, Jr.	Laurens Grant and Stanley Nelson, Jr.
Black Power Mixtape 1967–1975, The	2011	Göran Hugo Olsson	Annika Rogell
Black Tar Heroin: The Dark End of the Street	1999	Steven Okazaki	Steven Okazaki
Black Zombie	2026	Maya Annik Bedward	Maya Annik Bedward, Kate Fraser, Hannah Donegan
Blackfish	2013	Gabriela Cowperthwaite	Manuel V. Oteyza, Gabriela Cowperthwaite
Blackout Experiments, The	2016	Rich Fox	Kris Curry
Blackpink: Light Up the Sky	2020	Caroline Suh	Cara Mones
Blacks and Jews	1997	Deborah Kaufman, Alan Snitow	Deborah Kaufman, Bari Scott, Alan Snitow
Blank Generation, The	1976	Zbenek Suchy	Ivan Kral
Bleeding Edge, The	2018	Kirby Dick	Amy Ziering, Amy Herdy
Blind Love: A Holocaust Journey Through Poland with Man's Best Friend	2015	Eli Rubenstein, Naomi Wise	Eli Rubenstein, Naomi Wise
Blindsight	2006	Lucy Walker	Sybil Robson Orr
Blink of an Eye	2019	Paul Taublieb	Mitch Covington, Susan Cooper, Pam Miller
BLKNWS: Terms & Conditions	2025	Kahlil Joseph	Kahlil Joseph, Amy Greenleaf, Nic Gonda, Onye Anyanwu
Blood Brothers: Malcolm X & Muhammad Ali	2021	Marcus A. Clarke	Kenya Barris, Ayanna Hart, Jason Perez
Blood into Wine	2010	Ryan Page, Christopher Pomerenke	
Blood of the Beasts	1949	Georges Franju	Paul Legros
Blood of Yingzhou District, The	2006	Ruby Yang	Thomas Lennon
Bloodline	2008	Bruce Burgess	Bruce Burgess
BloodSisters: Leather, Dykes & Sadomasochism	1995	Michelle Handelman	Michelle Handelman, Monte Cazazza
Bloodsucking Cinema	2007	Barry Gray	Jeff Bowler, Randy Charach, Wendy McKernan, Steele Shannon, Laura Amelse Watson
Blue Angels, The	2024	Paul Crowder	Glen Powell, Sean Stuart, Glen Zipper, Mark Monroe, J. J. Abrams, Hannah Minghella
Blue Rodeo: Lost Together	2024	Dale Heslip	Francine Dibacco, Corey Russell
Blue Vinyl	2002	Daniel B. Gold and Judith Helfand	Daniel B. Gold, Judith Helfand, and Julia D. Parker
Bob Ross: Happy Accidents, Betrayal & Greed	2021	Joshua Rofé	Steven J. Berger, Divya D'Souza, Ben Falcone, Melissa McCarthy, Joshua Rofé, Lukas Cox
Bobby Fischer Against the World	2011	Liz Garbus	Nancy Abraham, Stanley F. Buchthal, Liz Garbus, Matthew Justus, Rory Kennedy
Body of War	2007	Ellen Spiro and Phil Donahue	Ellen Spiro and Phil Donahue
Bodybuilder and I, The	2007	Bryan Friedman	Julia Rosenberg, Anita Lee
Bomb, The	2015	Rushmore DeNooyer	Lone Wolf Media
Bomb Harvest	2007	Kim Mordaunt	Sylvia Wilczynski
Bomb It	2007	Jon Reiss	Tracy Wares, Jon Reiss, Jeffrey Levy-Hinte, Kate Christensen
Bonfires	2017	Martin Bureau	Catherine Benoit
Bono: Stories of Surrender	2025	Andrew Dominik	Meredith Bennett, Dede Gardner, Jon Kamen, Jeremy Kleiner, Brad Pitt, Alec Sash, Dave Sirulnick
Booksellers, The	2019	D.W. Young	D.W. Young, Dan Wechsler, Judith Mizrachy
Boorman and the Devil	2025	David Kittredge	Jim Fall, David Kittredge, Travis Stevens
Boris Karloff: The Man Behind the Monster	2021	Thomas Hamilton	Nick Howe, Natasha Markou, Duncan Moss, John Ozment
Born in the USSR: 21 Up	2005	Sergei Miroshnichenko	Jemma Jupp
Born into Brothels: Calcutta's Red Light Kids	2004	Zana Briski and Ross Kauffman	Zana Briski and Ross Kauffman
Born Rich	2003	Jamie Johnson	Jamie Johnson, Dirk Wittenborn, and Nick Kurzon
Bougainville – Our Island Our Fight	1998	Wayne Coles-Janess	Wayne Coles-Janess
Bowie: The Final Act	2025	Jonathan Stiasny	Daniel Hall
Bowling for Columbine	2002	Michael Moore	Kathleen Glynn, Jim Czarnecki, Charles Bishop, and Michael Donovan
Boy Interrupted	2009	Dana Perry	Dana Perry
Boy Named Sue, A	2000	Julie Wyman	
Boylesque	2022	Bogna Kowalczyk	Tomasz Morawski, Katarzyna Kuczyńska, Vratislav Šlajer
Boys of Buchenwald, The	2002	Audrey Mehler	David Paperny
Bra Boys: Blood Is Thicker than Water	2007	Sunny Abberton	Sunny Abberton
Brainwashing of My Dad, The	2015	Jen Senko	Matthew Modine, Adam Rackoff
Brandon Teena Story, The	1998	Susan Muska, Greta Olafsdottir	Jane Dekrone
Brats	2024	Andrew McCarthy	Adrian Buitenhuis, Derik Murray
Break the Silence: The Movie	2020	Park Jun-soo	
Breakdown: 1975	2025	Morgan Neville	Morgan Neville, Lauren Belfer
Breakfast with Hunter	2003	Wayne Ewing	Wayne Ewing
Breaking the Silence: Truth and Lies in the War on Terror	2003	John Pilger	
Breath of the Gods – A Journey to the Origins of Modern Yoga	2012	Jan Schmidt-Garre	Marieke Schroeder
Brené Brown: The Call to Courage	2019	Sandra Restrepo	
BRIC: The New World	2010		Jorge Lanata
Bridegroom: A Love Story, Unequaled	2013	Linda Bloodworth-Thomason	
Bridge, The	2006	Eric Steel	Eric Steel
Brief History of Time, A	1991	Errol Morris	David Hickman
Bright Lights: Starring Carrie Fisher and Debbie Reynolds	2016	Alexis Bloom and Fisher Stevens	Alexis Bloom, Todd Fisher, and Julie Nives
Bring On the Night	1985	Michael Apted	David Manson
Bring the Soul: The Movie	2019	Park Jun-soo	
Bringing Tibet Home	2013	Tenzin Tsetan Choklay	Tenzin Tsetan Choklay, Tenzing Rigdol
Brink, The	2019	Alison Klayman	Alison Klayman, Therese Guirgis
Britney: For the Record	2008	Phil Griffin	Andrew Fried
Brocket 99: Rockin' the Country	2006	Nilesh Patel	Nilesh Patel
Broke*	2011	Will Gray	Will Gray
Broken Branches	2014	Ayala Sharot	
Broken Dreams	2019	Tomasz Magierski	Tomasz Magierski
Broken English	2025	Iain Forsyth, Jane Pollard	Beth Earl
Bronies: The Extremely Unexpected Adult Fans of My Little Pony	2012	Laurent Malaquais	Anglie Brown, Morgan Peterson
Brony Tale, A	2014	Brent Hodge	Brent Hodge & Lauren Bercovitch and Morgan Spurlock
Bronze Screen, The	2001	Susan Racho, Alberto Dominguez	
Brooklyn Bridge	1981	Ken Burns	Ken Burns, Roger M. Sherman, Buddy Squires, and Amy Stechler
Brooklyn Dodgers: Ghosts of Flatbush	2007		Aaron Cohen, Charles Olivier
Bros: After the Screaming Stops	2018	Joe Pearlman, David Soutar	Leo Pearlman
Brother's Keeper	1992	Joe Berlinger, Bruce Sinofsky	Joe Berlinger, Bruce Sinofsky
Brug, De	1928	Joris Ivens	
BTS: The Return	2026	Bao Nguyen	Bao Nguyen, Jane Cha Cutler, R. J. Cutler, Namjo Kim, Choongeon Lee, Se Jun Lee, Elise Pearlstein, Trevor Smith
Buddha, The	2010	David Grubin	
Buddha's Lost Children	2006	Mark Verkerk	Ton Okkerse, Pim van Collem
Buddhas barn	2003	Christina Rosendahl	
Buena Vista Social Club	1999	Wim Wenders	
Bugs Bunny: Superstar	1975	Larry Jackson	Larry Jackson
Bukowski	1973	Taylor Hackford	
Bunkar: The Last of the Varanasi Weavers	2018	Satyaprakash Upadhyay	Narrative Pictures and Sapana Sharma
Bunso	2005	Ditsi Carolino	Ditsi Carolino
Burden of Dreams	1982	Les Blank	
Buried Country	2003	Andy Nehl	Andy Nehl
Burma VJ	2008	Anders Østergaard	
Burn	2012	Tom Putnam, Brenna Sanchez	Tom Putnam, Brenna Sanchez
Burn the Stage: The Movie	2018	Park Jun-soo	Yoon Ji-won
Burning Child, The	2019	Joseph Leo Koerner, Christian D. Bruun	Joseph Leo Koerner, Christian D. Bruun, Bo-Mi Choi
Burning the Future: Coal in America	2008	David Novack	Alexis Zoullas, David Novack
Bury Me in Redwood Country	2009	Benjamin Greené, Benj Cameron	
Bus 174	2002	Jose Padilha	Jose Padilha and Marcos Prado
Bush Family Fortunes: The Best Democracy Money Can Buy	2004	Steven Grandison, Greg Palast	Meirion Jones, Greg Palast, Linda Levy, Leni Von Ekhardt, Duane Andrews
Bush Policeman	1953	Lee Robinson	
Buster Keaton Rides Again	1965	John Spotton	Julian Biggs
Butterflies	2009	Ester Brymova	Tom Duty
Buy Bye Beauty	2001	Pål Hollender	Pål Hollender
Buy Now! The Shopping Conspiracy	2024	Nic Stacey	Flora Bagenal
Buy the Ticket, Take the Ride: Hunter S. Thompson on Film	2006	Tom Thurman	Christopher Black, Tom Thurman
By Reason of Insanity	2015	Louis Theroux	
Bye Bye Barry	2023	Paul Monusky, Micaela Powers, Angela Torma	Jeff Cameron, Chris Weaver

== C ==
† = Series

Title	Year	Director(s)	Producer(s)
Caine's Arcade	2012	Nirvan Mullick	Nirvan Mullick
California Reich, The	1975	Walter F. Parkes	Walter F. Parkes
Call + Response	2008	Justin Dillon	Justin Dillon
Call Me Kuchu	2012	Malika Zouhali-Worrall and Katherine Fairfax Wright	Jeffrey Blitz, Malika Zouhali-Worrall
Call Me Lucky	2015	Bobcat Goldthwait	Clinton Trucks and Charlie Fonville
Call of the Ice	2016	Mike Magidson, Xavier Liberman	Caroline Broussaud, Philippe Molins
Call of the Wild	2007	Ron Lamothe	Ron Lamothe
Calle 54	2000	Fernando Trueba	
camino de Santiago, El	2018	Tristán Bauer	
Camp 14: Total Control Zone	2012	Marc Wiese	Axel Engstfeld
Cancer	2015	Barak Goodman	Ken Burns
Cane Toads: An Unnatural History	1988	Mark Lewis	
Cannibal Tours	1988	Dennis O'Rourke	
Cantor's Tale, A	2005	Erik Greenberg Anjou	Erik Greenberg Anjou
Capitalism: A Love Story	2009	Michael Moore	Michael Moore
Captain Mike Across America	2007	Michael Moore	
Captains, The	2011	William Shatner	J. Craig Thompson
Captivated: The Trials of Pamela Smart	2014	Jeremiah Zagar	Lori Cheatle, Gabriel Sedgwick
Capturing the Friedmans	2003	Andrew Jarecki	
Capturing Reality: The Art of Documentary	2008	Pepita Ferrari	
Caravana del manuscrito andalusí, La	2007	Lidia Peralta García	
Carl Panzram: The Spirit of Hatred and Vengeance	2011	John Borowski	John Borowski
Carlo Giuliani, Boy	2002	Francesca Comencini	Mauro Berardi
Carlos	2023	Rudy Valdez	Rudy Valdez, Sara Bernstein, Leopoldo Gout, Liz Morhaim
Carnaval	2024	Gabriel Tejada, María José Osorio	
Cartel Land	2015	Matthew Heineman	Matthew Heineman, Tom Yellin
Carville: Winning Is Everything, Stupid!	2024	Matt Tyrnauer	Matt Tyrnauer, Ryan Rothmaier, Corey Reeser, Susan Mccue, Graham High
¡Casa Bonita Mi Amor!	2024	Arthur Bradford	Jennifer Ollman
Case Against 8, The	2014	Ben Cotner, Ryan White	Ben Cotner, Ryan White
Casino Jack and the United States of Money	2010	Alex Gibney	Mark Cuban
Casting JonBenet	2017	Kitty Green	Kitty Green, Scott Macaulay, James Schamus
The Castle (Le Château)	2020	Denys Desjardins	Denys Desjardins
Castro Street	1966	Bruce Baillie	Bruce Baillie
Catching Fire: The Story of Anita Pallenberg	2023	Alexis Bloom, Svetlana Zill	Charlie Corwin
Catfish	2010	Henry Joost, Ariel Schulman	Andrew Jarecki, Marc Smerling, Henry Joost, Ariel Schulman
Cats of Mirikitani, The	2006	Linda Hattendorf	Linda Hattendorf, Masa Yoshikawa
Cave of Forgotten Dreams	2010	Werner Herzog	
Celebration of Horses, A: The American Saddlebred	2003		
Celluloid Closet, The	1996	Rob Epstein, Jeffrey Friedman	
Celsius 41.11	2004	Kevin Knoblock	Lionel Chetwynd
The Cemetery Club	2006	Tali Shemesh	
Certain Kind of Death, A	2003	Grover Babcock, Blue Hadaegh	
Chain Camera	2001	Kirby Dick	
Chain Reactions	2024	Alexandre O. Philippe	Kerry Deignan Roy
Challenging Impossibility	2011	Natabara Rollosson, Sanjay Rawal	Natabara Rollosson, Sanjay Rawal
Champions of Faith	2008	Tom Allen	John Morales, Lino Rulli
Champollion: A Scribe for Egypt	2000	Jean-Claude Lubtchansky	Jean-Pierre Gibrat
Chances: The Women of Magdalene	2006	Tom Neff	Tom Neff
Chandani - The daughter of the elephant whisperer	2010	Arne Birkenstock	Arne Birkenstock
Chang	1927	Merian C. Cooper	Ernest B. Schoedsack, Jesse Lasky, and Adolph Zukor
CHAOS: The Manson Murders	2025	Errol Morris	Errol Morris, Robert Fernandez, Steven Hathaway
Chariots of the Gods	1970	Harald Reinl	Manfred Barthel, Günther Eulau
Charm City	2018	Marilyn Ness	Marilyn Ness, Katy Chevigny
Chasing Coral	2017	Jeff Orlowski	
Chasing Ghosts: Beyond the Arcade	2007	Lincoln Ruchti	Michael Verrechia
Chavela	2017	Catherine Gund, Daresha Kyi	Catherine Gund, Daresha Kyi
Cheat You Fair: The Story of Maxwell Street	2007	Phil Ranstrom	Phil Ranstrom
Cheech & Chong's Last Movie	2024	David L. Bushell	David L. Bushell, Robbi Chong
Cheese Mites, The	1903	F. Martin Duncan	Charles Urban
Chef Thémis, cuisinier sans frontières	2009	Philippe Lavalette	
Chernobyl Heart	2003	Maryann DeLeo	
Cherry Valentine: Gypsy Queen and Proud	2022	Pete Grant	Victoria Bolstridge, Pete Grant
Chi	2013	Anne Wheeler	Yves J. Ma
Chicago Maternity Center Story, The	1976	Gordon Quinn, Jerry Blumenthal	Gordon Quinn, Jerry Blumenthal
Chicken People	2016	Nicole Lucas Haimes	
Chicken Ranch	1983	Nick Broomfield and Sandi Sissel	Nick Broomfield
Chicks in White Satin	1993	Elaine Holliman	Jason Schneider
Children of the Pyre	2008	Rajesh S. Jala	Rajesh S. Jala
Children of the Revolution	2010	Shane O'Sullivan	Shane O'Sullivan
Children Who Cheated the Nazis, The	2000	Sue Read	Jim Goulding
Chile: When Will It End?	1986	David Bradbury	
China Blue	2005	Micha Peled	
Choice 2020, The: Trump vs. Biden	2020	Michael Kirk	Michael Kirk, Mike Wiser, Philip Bennett, Jim Gilmore, Gabrielle Schonder
Chosen and Excluded – The Hatred of Jews in Europe	2017	Joachim Schroeder, Sophie Hafner	Joachim Schroeder
Chronicle of a Summer	1960	Edgar Morin	
Chuck Norris vs Communism	2015	Ilinca Călugăreanu	Mara Adina
Church of Saint Coltrane, The	1996	Jeff Swimmer	Alan Klingenstein
Cinemania	2002	Angela Christlieb, Stephen Kijak	Gunter Hanfgarn, Stephen Kijak, Avi Weider
Cinerama Adventure	2002	David Strohmaier	Randy Gitsch
Cinéma Vérité: Defining the Moment	1999	Peter Wintonick	Adam Symansky, Éric Michel
Circus of Books	2019	Rachel Mason	Rachel Mason, Kathryn Robson
Cirque, Le: A Table in Heaven	2007	Andrew Rossi	Gregory P. Heyman, Charles Marquardt, Kate Novack
Cités perdues des Mayas, Le	2000	Jean-Claude Lubtchansky	Jean-Pierre Gibrat
City, The	1939	Ralph Steiner and Willard Van Dyke	
City Dreamers	2018	Joseph Hillel	Ziad Touma
City Hall	2020	Frederick Wiseman	Frederick Wiseman, Karen Konicek
City of Ghosts	2017	Matthew Heineman	Matthew Heineman
City of God – 10 Years Later	2013	Cavi Borges, Luciano Vidigal	Carla Osório
City of Gold	2015	Laura Gabbert	Laura Gabbert, Holly Becker, Braxton Pope
City of Water	2007	Jasper Goldman	
City of Wax	1934		Horace Woodard, Stacy Woodard
Classic Creatures: Return of the Jedi	1983	Robert Guenette	Robert Guenette
Classroom 8	2023	Héctor Gálvez	Héctor Gálvez
Claude Lanzmann: Spectres of the Shoah	2015	Adam Benzine	Adam Benzine, Kimberley Warner
Clean	2022	Lachlan Mcleod	David Elliot-Jones, Charlotte Wheaton
Cleanin' Up the Town: Remembering Ghostbusters	2019	Anthony Bueno	Anthony Bueno, Claire Bueno
Clerk	2021	Malcolm Ingram	Craig Fleming, Malcolm Ingram
Client 9: The Rise and Fall of Eliot Spitzer	2010	Alex Gibney	
Climate Hustle	2016	Christopher Rogers	Christopher Rogers
Climb, The	2007	Mark Johnston	
Climb Dance	1989	Jean Louis Mourey	
Clinton Chronicles, The	1994	Patrick Matrisciana	Patrick Matrisciana
Closed for Storm	2020	Jake Williams	Dan Bell, Nicholas Novak, John Shaw, Darren Mercer
Closer Walk, A	2003	Robert Bilheimer	
Cocaine Cowboys	2006	Billy Corben	Alfred Spellman, Billy Corben, David Cypkin
Cocaine Cowboys 2	2008	Billy Corben and Lisa M. Perry	Alfred Spellman, Billy Corben, David Cypkin
Cockettes, The	2002	Bill Weber, David Weissman	David Weissman
Cocksucker Blues	1972	Robert Frank and Daniel Seymour	Marshall Chess
Code, The	2001	Hannu Puttonen	Jacques Debs, Delphine Morel
Code-Breakers, The	2006		
Code Rush	2000	David Winton	
Coded Bias	2000	Shalini Kantayya	Shalini Kantayya
Cold Case Hammarskjöld	2019	Mads Brügger	Nadja Nørgaard Kristensen
Coldplay: A Head Full of Dreams	2018	Mat Whitecross	Hannah Clark, Fiona Neilson and Stefan Demetriou
Collective	2019	Alexander Nanau	
Collision	2009	Darren Doane	
Colony	2010	Carter Gunn, Ross McDonnell	Morgan Bushe, Macdara Kelleher
Color Adjustment	1992	Marlon Riggs	
Colors: Bangin' in South Carolina	2014	Terry Davis	
Columbia: The Tragic Loss	2004	Naftaly Gliksberg	Udi Zamberg, Michael Tapuach
Comandante	2003	Oliver Stone	
Come See Me in the Good Light	2025	Ryan White	Jessica Hargrave, Tig Notaro, Ryan White, Stef Willen
Comedians in Africa, The	1967		
Comic Book Confidential	1988	Ron Mann	
Comic-Con Episode IV: A Fan's Hope	2011	Morgan Spurlock	Morgan Spurlock, Thomas Tull, Jeremy Chilnick, Matthew Galkin, Harry Knowles, Stan Lee
Coming Soon	1982	John Landis	Mick Garris, Robert B. Idels, John Landis
Communion	2016	Anna Zamecka	Khashyar Darvish
Compassion in Action	2014	Khashyar Darvish	Khashyar Darvish
A Complete History of My Sexual Failures	2008	Chris Waitt	Henry Trotter, Mary Burke
Computer Networks: The Heralds of Resource Sharing	1972	Peter Chvany	Steven King
Conan O'Brien Can't Stop	2011	Rodman Flender	Gavin Polone, Rachel Griffin
Concerning Violence	2014	Göran Olsson	Tobias Janson, Annika Rogell
Concerto for Other Hands	2024	Ernesto González Díaz	Ernesto González Díaz, Grace Ríos Vázquez
Concrete Pharaohs	2010	Jordan Todorov	Martichka Bozhilova
Confronting the Truth		Steve York	
Congo River, Beyond Darkness	2005	Thierry Michel	Rosadel Varela and Hani Salama
Conlanging: The Art of Crafting Tongues	2017	Britton Watkins	
Connected: An Autoblogography About Love, Death & Technology	2011	Tiffany Shlain	Tiffany Shlain, Carlton Evans
Connections: An Investigation into Organized Crime in Canada	1977		
Conquest of Everest, The	1953	George Lowe	
Contestant, The	2023	Clair Titley	Megumi Inman, Andee Ryder, Ian Bonhôte, Amit Dey
Control Room	2004	Jehane Noujaim	
Coppers	2019	Alan Zweig	Michael McMahon, Kristina McLaughlin, Kevin McMahon
Copycat	2015	Charlie Shackleton	Anthony Ing, Charlie Shackleton
Corona, La	2008	Amanda Micheli	Luis Colina
Coronation	2020	Ai Weiwei	Ai Weiwei
Corporation, The	2003	Jennifer Abbott and Mark Achbar	
Cosmic Voyage	1996	Bayley Silleck	
Cosmos: A Personal Voyage	1980	Adrian Malone	
Country Boys	2006	David Sutherland	
Courage to Care, The	1985	Robert H. Gardner	Robert H. Gardner, Carol Rittner
Courting Condi	2008	Sebastian Doggart	
Cousin Bobby	1992	Sebastian Doggart	
Cove, The	2009	Louie Psihoyos	Fisher Stevens, Paula DuPre Pesmen, Olivia Ahnemann
Cover-Up	2025	Laura Poitras, Mark Obenhaus	Laura Poitras, Mark Obenhaus, Yoni Golijov, Olivia Streisand
Cow at My Table, A	1998	Jennifer Abbott	
Cowboy and the Queen, The	2023	Andrea Blaugrund Nevins	Andrea Blaugrund Nevins, Graham Clark
Cowspiracy: The Sustainability Secret	2014	Kip Andersen, Keegan Kuhn	Kip Andersen, Keegan Kuhn
Cracked	2024	Alana Simões	José Ramón Mikelajáuregui
Craigslist Joe	2012	Joseph Garner	Eve Marson Singbiel, Joseph Garner, Angelique Sheppard
Crawford	2008	David Modigliani	David Modigliani
Crazy About One Direction	2013	Daisy Asquith	
Crazy English	1999	Zhang Yuan	
Crazy Love	2007	Dan Klores, Fisher Stevens	Dan Klores
Creators, The	2011	Laura Gamse and Jacques de Villiers	Thulani Nahum Deke
The Creepy Line	2018	M.A Taylor	Peter Schweizer, Eric Eggers, William Pilgrim, Michelle N. Taylor
Crime After Crime	2011	Yoav Potash	Yoav Potash
Crime that Changed Serbia	1995	Janko Baljak	
Criminals Gone Wild	2008	Ousala Aleem	Ousala Aleem, Ali Aleem
Crip Camp: A Disability Revolution	2020	Nicole Newnham, James Lebrecht	Nicole Newnham, James Lebrecht, Sara Bolder
Crips and Bloods: Made in America	2008	Stacy Peralta	Shaun Murphy
Crisis: Behind a Presidential Commitment	1963	Robert Drew	Robert Drew, Gregory Shuker
Crisis Hotline: Veterans Press 1	2013	Ellen Goosenberg Kent	Dana Perry
Cross, The: The Arthur Blessitt Story	2009	Matthew Crouch	Matthew Crouch, Laurie Crouch, Richard J. Cook, Stephan Blinn
Crossfire Hurricane	2012	Brett Morgen	Mick Jagger, Victoria Pearman, Keith Richards, Charlie Watts
Crossing the Line 2: The New Face of Anti-Semitism on Campus	2015	Shoshana Palatnik	Raphael Shore
Cruel and Unusual	2006	Janet Baus, Dan Hunt, Reid Williams	Janet Baus, Dan Hunt, Reid Williams
Crumb	1994	Terry Zwigoff	
Cry of Jazz, The	1959	Edward O. Bland	Edward O. Bland, Nelam L. Hill
Cuba and the Cameraman	2017	Jon Alpert	
Culture High, The	2014	Brett Harvey	Michael Bobroff, Don Metz
Curve, The	2020	Adam Benzine	Adam Benzine
Cutting Edge: The Magic of Movie Editing, The	2004	Wendy Apple	Wendy Apple
Cyber Seniors	2014	Saffron Cassaday	Brenda Rusnak

== D ==
† = Series

Title	Year	Director(s)	Producer(s)
Dad Made Dirty Movies	2011	Jordan Todorov	Martichka Bozhilova, Thomas Tielsch
Daddy of Rock 'n' Roll, The	2003	Daniel Bitton	
Dahomey	2024	Mati Diop	Mati Diop, Eve Robin, Judith Lou Lévy
Dalai Lama Awakening	2014	Khashyar Darvich	Khashyar Darvich
Dalai Lama Renaissance	2007	Khashyar Darvich	
Dale	2007	Rory Karpf, Mike Viney	Jeff Hillegass
Dalekmania	1995	Kevin Davies	John Farbrother
Damnés de la mer, Les	2008	Jawad Rhalib	
Dance Dreams: Hot Chocolate Nutcracker	2020	Oliver Bokelberg	Oliver Bokelberg, Kenita Nichols
Daniel Chester French: American Sculptor	2022	Eduardo Montes-Bradley	
Danielson: A Family Movie	2006	JL Aronson	
Dangerous Game, A	2014	Anthony Baxter	Richard Phinney
Dangerous Living: Coming Out in the Developing World	2003	John Scagliotti	
Dario Argento Panico	2023	Simone Scafidi	Giada Mazzoleni, Daniele Bolcato
Dario Argento's World of Horror	1985	Michele Soavi	Michele Soavi
Darius Goes West	2007	Logan Smalley	
Dark Horse: The Incredible True Story of Dream Alliance	2015	Louise Osmond	
Dark Side of Chocolate, The	2010	Miki Mistrati, U. Roberto Romano	Helle Faber
Darwin's Nightmare	2004	Hubert Sauper	
Darwin et la science de l'évolution	2002	Valérie Winckler	Jean-Pierre Gibrat
Daughters of Dolma	2013	Adam Miklos	
Dave Chappelle's Block Party	2005	Michel Gondry	
Dave Not Coming Back	2020	Jonah Malak	Audrey-Ann Dupuis-Pierre, Jonah Malak
David Crosby: Remember My Name	2019	A. J. Eaton	Cameron Crowe
David Wants to Fly	2010	David Sieveking	Martin Heisler, Carl-Ludwig Rettinger
Dawg Fight	2015	Billy Corben	Alfred Spellman
Dawson City: Frozen Time	2016	Bill Morrison	Bill Morrison, Madeleine Molyneaux
Day of Rage: How Trump Supporters Took the U.S. Capitol	2021	David Botti, Malachy Browne	David Botti, Malachy Browne, and others
Day of the Fight	1951	Stanley Kubrick	
Day the Earth Nearly Died, The	2002		Nick Davidson
Day the Universe Changed, The	1985	James Burke	
Dead Birds	1963	Robert Gardner	
Dead On: The Life and Cinema of George A. Romero	2008	Rusty Nails	
Dead Souls	2018	Wang Bing	Serge Lalou, Camille Laemmle, Louise Prince, Wang Bing
Deadliest Crash: The Le Mans 1955 Disaster	2009	Richard Heap	
Deaf President Now!	2025	Nyle DiMarco, Davis Guggenheim	Nyle DiMarco, Davis Guggenheim, Amanda Rohlke, Jonathan King, Michael Harte
Dealing Dogs	2006	Tom Simon, Sarah Teale	Tom Simon, Sarah Teale
Dean and Me: Roadshow of an American Primary	2008	Heath Eiden	Iris Cahn, Deanna Kamiel
Dear Jesse	1998	Tim Kirkman	Mary Beth Mann, Mike Morley
Dear Mandela	2012	Dara Kell, Christopher Nizza	Dara Kell, Christopher Nizza
Dear Mr. Watterson	2013	Joel Allen Schroeder	Chris Browne, Matt McUsic
Dear Ms.: A Revolution in Print	2025	Salima Koroma, Alice Gu, Cecilia Aldarondo	William Ventura
Dear Zachary: A Letter to a Son About His Father	2008	Kurt Kuenne	Kurt Kuenne
Death by Design: The Life and Times of Life and Times	1995	Peter Friedman, Jean-François Brunet	
Death by Numbers	2024	Kim A. Snyder	Kim A. Snyder, Janique L. Robillard, Maria Cuomo Cole
Death Faces	1988	Countess Victoria Bloodhart and Steve White	
Death for Five Voices	1995	Werner Herzog	Lucki Stipetic
Death in Arizona	2014	Tin Dirdamal	Julio Chavezmontes, Tin Dirdamal
Death in the Terminal	2016	Tali Shemesh, Asaf Sudri	
Death Mills	1945	Billy Wilder, Hanuš Burger	
Death of a Japanese Salesman	2011	Mami Sunada	
Death of an Indie Label	2011		
Death of Kevin Carter, The: Casualty of the Bang Bang Club	2004	Dan Krauss	Dan Krauss
Death of Merit†	2011		
Death of "Superman Lives": What Happened?, The	2015	Jon Schnepp	Holly Payne
Death on a Factory Farm	2009	Tom Simon, Sarah Teale	Tom Simon, Sarah Teale
Death on the Rock	1988	N/A	Thames Television
Death Scenes	1989	Nick Bougas	Nick Bougas
Death Scenes 2	1992	Nick Bougas	Nick Bougas
Debtocracy	2011	Katerina Kitidi & Aris Chatzistefanou	Kostas Efimeros
Decade Under the Influence, A	2003	Ted Demme, Richard LaGravenese	
Decent One, The	2014	Vanessa Lapa	Felix Breisach
Decline of Western Civilization, The, Part II: The Metal Years, Part III †	1981–1998	Penelope Spheeris	
Decoding COVID-19	2020	Sarah Holt	Sarah Holt, Jane Teeling, Caitlin Saks, David Borenstein, Ma Liyan
Deep Web	2015	Alex Winter	Marc Schiller, Alex Winter, Glen Zipper
Deepfaking Sam Altman	2025	Adam Bhala Lough	Harold Beron III, Kevin Hart, Luke Kelly-Clyne, Bryan Smiley
Defamation	2009	Yoav Shamir	Sandra Itkoff, Karoline Leth, Philippa Kowarsky, Knut Ogris
Delicacy, The	2020	Jason Wise	Christina Wise, Jason Wise, Jackson Myers, Eric Esrailian
Deliver Us from Evil	2006	Amy J. Berg	Amy J. Berg, Matthew Cooke, Frank Donner, Hermass Lassalle
Demon House	2018	Zak Bagans	Michael Dorsey, Joseph Taglieri
Demons and Wonders	1987	José Mojica Marins	José Mojica Marins
Depeche Mode: M	2025	Fernando Frías de la Parra	Saul Levitz, Stacy Perskie, Nina Soriano
Derby, The	1895	Birt Acres	Birt Acres
Departure, The	2017	Lana Wilson	Lana Wilson
Design Canada	2018	Greg Durrell	Jessica Edwards
Desperate Souls, Dark City and the Legend of Midnight Cowboy	2022	Nancy Buirski	Nancy Buirski, Simon Kilmurry, Susan Margolin
Desperately Seeking Helen	1998	Eisha Marjara	David Wilson
Destination Hitchcock: The Making of North by Northwest	2000	Peter Fitzgerald	
Determinations	1987	Oliver Hockenhull	
Devil and Daniel Johnston, The	2006	Jeff Feuerzeig	
Devil Came on Horseback, The	2007	Ricki Stern and Anne Sundberg	
Devo	2024	Chris Smith	Danny Gabai, Anita Greenspan, Chris Holmes, David C. McCourt
Dhamma Brothers, The	2007	Jenny Phillips, Andrew Kukura, Anne Marie Stein	Jenny Phillips, Anne Marie Stein
Dial H-I-S-T-O-R-Y	1997	Johan Grimonprez	Johan Grimonprez
Diamond in the Dunes	2009	Christopher Rufo	
Diana's Hair Ego	1991	Ellen Spiro	Ellen Spiro
Diary	1983	David Perlov	Mira Perlov
Diary for Timothy, A	1945	Humphrey Jennings	
Dick Johnson Is Dead	2020	Kirsten Johnson	Katy Chevigny, Marilyn Ness
Die andere Liebe (The Other Love)	1988	Axel Otten and Helmut Kißling	DEFA
Diego Maradona	2019	Asif Kapadia	James Gay-Rees, Paul Martin
Digital Dharma: One Man's Mission to Save a Culture	2012	Dafna Yachin	Dafna Yachin
Digna... hasta el último aliento	2003	Felipe Cazals	
Dimona Twist	2016	Michal Aviad	
Dinosaur!	1985	Robert Guenette	
Dinosaur 13	2014	Todd Douglas Miller	Todd Douglas Miller
Dinosaurs Alive!	2007	David Clark, Bayley Silleck	
Dinosaurs: Giants of Patagonia	2007	Marc Fafard	Carl Samson
Dinosaurs: Myths & Reality	1995	Graham Holloway	Bob Carruthers
Diplomat, The	2015	David Holbrooke	Stacey Reiss
Dipped in Black	2023	Matthew Thorne, Derik Lynch	Matthew Thorne, Patrick Graham
Dirt! The Movie	2009	Bill Benenson, Gene Rosow	Bill Benenson, Eleonore Dailly, Gene Rosow
Dirty Hands: The Art and Crimes of David Choe	2008	Harry Kim	Harry Kim, Elizabeth Ai
The Disappearance of McKinley Nolan	2010	Henry Corra	Jeremy Amar, Henry Corra, Celia Maysles
Disco's Revenge	2024	Omar Majeed, Peter Mishara	Noah Segal, Sam Sutherland, Christina Piovesan, Dave Harris
Dis-moi	1980	Chantal Akerman	Chantal Akerman
Disrupted, The	2020	Sarah Colt, John Gleason	Sarah Colt, John Gleason
Disturbance in the Force, A	2023	Jeremy Coon, Steve Kozak	Jeremy Coon, Steve Kozak, Kyle Newman
Dive!	2010	Jeremy Seifert	Jeremy Seifert
Divine Trash	1998	Steve Yeager	
Divine Waters	1985	Vito Zagarrio	
Diving into the Unknown	2016	Juan Reina	Juho Harjula
Dixie Chicks: Shut Up and Sing	2006	Barbara Kopple and Cecilia Peck	
Do I Sound Gay?	2014	David Thorpe	
Do You Speak American?	2005	William Cran	William Cran, Christopher Buchanan
Doc of the Dead	2014	Alexandre O. Philippe	Robert Muratore, Kerry Deignan Roy
Dog Named Gucci, A	2015	Gorman Bechard	Gorman Bechard, Kristine Bechard
Doing Time, Doing Vipassana	1997	Ayelet Menahemi, Eilona Ariel	Eilona Ariel
Doing Time: Life Inside the Big House	1991	Alan Raymond	Alan Raymond, Susan Raymond
Dolce e selvaggio	1983	Antonio Climati, Mario Morra	Franco Prosperi
Dolphin Man	2017	Lefteris Charitos	Ed Barreveld, Yuri Averov, Rea Apostolides, Estelle Robin You
Dolphin Reef	2018	Alastair Fothergill, Keith Scholey	Alastair Fothergill, Keith Scholey, Roy Conli
Dominion	2018	Chris Delforce	Chris Delforce
Don't Change the Subject	2012	Mike Stutz	Matt Ima, Fiona Walsh
Don't Die: The Man Who Wants to Live Forever	2025	Chris Smith	Daniel Koehler, Chris Smith, Ashlee Vance
Done the Impossible	2006	Tony Hadlock, Jason Heppler, Jeremy Neish, Jared Nelson, Brian Wiser	Tony Hadlock, Jason Heppler, Jeremy Neish, Jared Nelson, Brian Wiser
Dont Look Back	1967	D.A. Pennebaker	
Door Is There, The	2023	Facundo Ponce de León, Juan Ponce de León	Lucila Bortagaray, Ramón Cardini
Doubletime	2007	Stephanie Johnes	Alexandra Johnes, Stephanie Johnes, Andrea Meditch
Down and Out in America	1986	Lee Grant	
Down from the Mountain	2000	Nick Doob, Chris Hegedus, D. A. Pennebaker	Bob Neuwirth
Down There	2006	Chantal Akerman	
Downloaded	2013	Alex Winter	Alex Winter
Drag Invasion	2020	Alberto Castro	Alberto Castro
Drag Kids	2019	Megan Wennberg	Edward Peill, Erin Oakes
Dreamcatcher	2015	Kim Longinotto	Lisa Stevens, Teddy Leifer
Dreams from My Real Father	2012	Joel Gilbert	Joel Gilbert
Dreams Rewired	2015	Manu Luksch, Martin Reinhart, Thomas Tode	Alexander Dumreicher-Ivanceanu, Linda Matern, Bady Minck, Mukul Patel
Dressed as a Girl	2015	Colin Rothbart	Colin Rothbart, Chris Amos
Drew: The Man Behind the Poster	2013	Erik Sharkey	Charles Ricciardi
Drift: The Sideways Craze	2007	Smadar Hanson	Smadar Hanson, Clyde Berg
Droomfabriek, De	2007	Netty van Hoorn	Netty van Hoorn
Drop Dead City	2024	Michael Rohatyn, Peter Yost	Michael Rohatyn, Peter Yost
Drunk in Public	2007	David J.Sperling	
Drunk Stoned Brilliant Dead: The Story of the National Lampoon	2015	Douglas Tirola	Douglas Tirola, Susan Bedusa
Dungeon Masters, The	2008	Keven McAlester	Brian Gerber, Jeffrey Kusama-Hinte, Kel Symons
Dust: The Lingering Legacy of 9/11	2021	Bridget Gormley	Gerry Sievers
Dust to Dust: The Health Effects of 9/11	2006	Heidi Dehncke Fisher	Bruce Kennedy
Dust to Glory	2005	Dana Brown	Mike McCoy, Scott Waugh
Dying at Grace	2003	Allan King	Allan King
Dying to Live: The Journey into a Man's Open Heart	2008	Ben Mittleman	Robert F. Landau

== E ==
† = Series

Title	Year	Director(s)	Producer(s)
e-Dreams	2001	Wonsuk Chin	Wonsuk Chin
Eagle Huntress, The	2016	Otto Bell	Otto Bell, Sharon Chang, Stacey Reiss
Eames: The Architect and the Painter	2011	Jason Cohn and Bill Jersey	Jason Cohn and Bill Jersey
Earth, Wind & Fire (To Be Celestial vs That's the Weight of the World)	2026	Questlove	Questlove, Dave Sirulnick, Samantha Grogin, KB White, Arron Saxe
Earthlings	2005	Shaun Monson	Brett Harrelson, Maggie Q, Persia White
Eating Our Way to Extinction	2021	Ludo Brockway, Otto Brockway	Ludo Brockway, Mark Galvin, Kian Tavakkoli
Eating You Alive	2018	Paul David Kennamer Jr.	Merrilee Jacobs, Paul David Kennamer Jr.
Echoes from a Ghost Minyan	1998	Gustave Rosanio, Joseph Van Blunk	Gustave Rosanio, Joseph Van Blunk
Echoes from a Somber Empire	1990	Werner Herzog	
Eclipse of Reason	1987	Bernard Nathanson	Bernard Nathanson and Adelle Roban Nathanson
Eco-Pirate: The Story of Paul Watson	2011	Trish Dolman	Kevin Eastwood, Trish Dolman
Ecstasy of Order: The Tetris Masters	2011	Adam Cornelius	Adam Cornelius, Robin Mihara, Vince Clemente
Edge of Democracy, The	2019	Petra Costa	Shane Boris, Petra Costa, Joanna Natasegara, Tiago Pavan
Edie & Thea: A Very Long Engagement	2009	Susan Muska, Gréta Ólafsdóttir	Susan Muska, Gréta Ólafsdóttir
Ego: The Michael Gudinski Story	2023	Paul Goldman	Paul Goldman, Paige McGinley, Bethany Jones
Eldridge Cleaver, Black Panther	1969	William Klein	William Klein
Eleanor Roosevelt Story, The	1965	Richard Kaplan	Sidney Glazier
Electric Boogaloo: The Wild, Untold Story of Cannon Films	2014	Mark Hartley	Brett Ratner, James Packer, Veronica Fury
Electronic Awakening	2011	A.C. Johner	A.C. Johner
Elephant	2020	Mark Linfield, Vanessa Berlowitz	Mark Linfield, Vanessa Berlowitz, Roy Conli
Elephant in the Living Room, The	2010	Michael Webber	Michael Webber
Elephant Queen, The	2019	Victoria Stone, Mark Deeble	
Elstree 1976	2015	Jon Spira	Steve Milne, Hank Starrs
Elton John: Never Too Late	2024	R. J. Cutler, David Furnish	R. J. Cutler, David Furnish, Trevor Smith
Emerald Diamond, The	2006	John Fitzgerald	
Emergent City	2024	Kelly Anderson, Jay Arthur Sterrenberg	Kelly Anderson, Brenda Avila
Emma Goldman: The Anarchist Guest	2000	Coleman Romalis	
Emperor's Naked Army Marches On, The	1987	Kazuo Hara	Sachiko Kobayashi
Empire des nombres, L'	2001	Philippe Truffault	Jean-Pierre Gibrat
Empire of Dreams: The Story of the Star Wars Trilogy	2004	Kevin Burns, Edith Becker	Edith Becker
Empire of the Air: The Men Who Made Radio	1992	Ken Burns	
Encounters at the End of the World	2007	Werner Herzog	Henry Kaiser
End of America, The	2008	Anne Sundberg and Ricki Stern	
End of Poverty?, The	2008	Philippe Diaz	
End of Suburbia, The	2004	Gregory Greene	
End of Time, The	2012	Peter Mettler	Gerry Flahive, Brigitte Hofer, Cornelia Seitler, Ingrid Veninger
Endgame: Blueprint for Global Enslavement	2007	Alex Jones	Alex Jones
Endless Summer, The	1966	Bruce Brown	Robert Bagley, Bruce Brown
Enemies of the People	2009	Thet Sambath, Rob Lemkin	Thet Sambath, Rob Lemkin
Enlighten Up!	2009	Kate Churchill	Kate Churchill
Ennio: The Maestro	2021	Giuseppe Tornatore	Gabriele Costa, Gianni Russo, Peter de Maegd, San Fu Maltha
Eno	1973	Alfi Sinniger	Alfi Sinniger
Eno	2024	Gary Hustwit	Gary Hustwit, Jessica Edwards
Enron: The Smartest Guys in the Room	2005	Alex Gibney	
Eraserheads: Combo on the Run	2025	Maria Diane Ventura	Francis Lumen, Maria Diane Ventura
Ernest Cole: Lost and Found	2024	Raoul Peck	Raoul Peck, Tamara Rosenberg
Essential Link, The: The Story of Wilfrid Israel	2017	Yonatan Nir	Noam Shalev
Eternal Memory, The	2023	Maite Alberdi	Maite Alberdi, Juan de Dios Larraín, Pablo Larraín, Rocio Jadue
Eternal Moment, The	2021	Sebastián Moreno	Claudia Barril
Eternal You	2024	Hans Block, Moritz Riesewieck	Christian Beetz, Georg Tschurtschenthaler, Lena Raith, Zora Nessl
Ethnic Notions	1987	Marlon Riggs	Marlon Riggs
Eurasia: The Conquest of the East †	2003	Patrick Cabouat	
Europa: The Last Battle	2017	Tobias Bratt	Tobias Bratt
Europe's New Faces	2025	Sam Abbas	Sam Abbas
EuroTrump	2017	Stephen Robert Morse and Nick Hampson	Stephen Robert Morse
Everest: The Other Side	2026	Elizabeth Chai Vasarhelyi, Jimmy Chin	Elizabeth Chai Vasarhelyi, Jimmy Chin, Shannon Dill, Anna Barnes, Bob Eisenhardt, Janet Yang
Every Body	2023	Julie Cohen	Tommy Nguyen, Molly O'Brien
Every Good Marriage Begins with Tears	2006	Simon Chambers	Simon Chambers
Every Little Thing	2024	Sally Aitken	Bettina Dalton, Oli Harbottle, Anna Godas
Everybody to Kenmure Street	2026	Felipe Bustos Sierra	Ciara Barry, Felipe Bustos Sierra
Everyday Life in a Syrian Village	1974	Omar Amiralay	
Everyone Is Lying to You for Money	2025	Ben McKenzie	Giorgio Angelini, Ben McKenzie
Everything's Cool	2007	Daniel B. Gold and Judith Helfand	
Ex Libris: The New York Public Library	2017	Frederick Wiseman	
Exile	2016	Rithy Panh	Catherine Dussart
Exit Through the Gift Shop	2010	Banksy	Jaimie D'Cruz
Exodus Decoded, The	2002	Simcha Jacobovici	James Cameron
Expedition: Bismarck	2002	James Cameron and Gary Johnstone	
Expelled: No Intelligence Allowed	2008	Nathan Frankowski	Logan Craft, Walt Ruloff, John Sullivan
Exploratorium	1974	Jon Boorstin	Jon Boorstin
Expo: Magic of the White City	2005	Mark Bussler	
Exposing Homelessness	2006	Kerri Gawryn	Kerri Gawryn
Eye of Vichy, The	1993	Claude Chabrol	Jean-Pierre Ramsay-Levi
Eyes and Ears of God: Video Surveillance of Sudan	2012	Tomo Križnar	Tomo Križnar, Živa Ozmec
Eyes of Thailand, The	2012	Windy Borman	Windy Borman, Tim VandeSteeg
Eyes of Tammy Faye, The	2000	Fenton Bailey, Randy Barbato	Fenton Bailey, Randy Barbato
Eyewitness	1999	Bert Van Bork	

== F ==
† = Series

Title	Year	Director(s)	Producer(s)
Face of Lincoln, The	1955	Edward Freed	Wilbur T. Blume
Face of Mercy, The	2016	David Naglieri	
Faces of Death, II, III, IV, V, VI †	1978–1996	Conan Le Cilaire, John Alan Schwartz, Susumu Saegusa, and Andrew Theopolis	John Alan Schwartz
Facing Fear	2013	Jason Cohen	Jason Cohen
Facing Sudan	2007	Bruce David Janu	
Facing the Music	2001	Bob Connolly and Robin Anderson	
Factor 8: The Arkansas Prison Blood Scandal	2005	Kelly Duda	Kelly Duda
Fagbug	2009	Erin Davies	
Fahrenheit 9/11	2004	Michael Moore	
Fahrenheit 11/9	2018	Michael Moore	Michael Moore, Carl Deal, Meghan O'Hara
Fairytale of Kathmandu	2007	Neasa Ní Chianáin	
Faith School Menace?	2010	Molly Milton	Russell Barnes
Falcão – Meninos do Tráfico	2006	MV Bill, Celso Athayde	MV Bill, Celso Athayde
Fall to Grace	2013	Alexandra Pelosi	Alexandra Pelosi, Lisa Heller
Fambul Tok	2011	Sara Terry	Sara Terry, Rory Kennedy, and Libby Hoffman
Family Affair	2010	Chico Colvard	Chico Colvard, Liz Garbus
Family Album	2024	Laura Casabé	Valeria Bistagnino, Tomás Eloy Muñoz Lázaro
Family Gathering	1988	Lise Yasui	
Fanalysis	2002	Bruce Campbell	Bruce Campbell
Fandom, The	2020	Ash Kreis, Eric Risher	Philip Kreis
Fangio: Una vita a 300 all'ora	1981	Hugh Hudson	
Fantastic Fungi	2019	Louie Schwartzberg	
Farewell Herr Schwarz	2014	Yael Reuveny	Melanie Andernach
Farm, The: Angola, USA	1998	Liz Garbus, Wilbert Rideau, Jonathan Stack	Liz Garbus, Jonathan Stack
Farmer's Wife, The	1998	David Sutherland	
Farmland	2014	James Moll	James Moll, Christopher Pavlick
Farthest, The	2017	Emer Reynolds	John Murray, Claire Stronge
Fast, Cheap & Out of Control	1997	Errol Morris	
Fat Camp: An MTV Docs Movie Presentation	2006	Cheryl Horner, James Huang, Kristen Schylinski	Cheryl Horner
Fat Chance	1994	Jeff McKay	Charles Konowal, Joe MacDonald
Fat Head	2009	Tom Naughton	Susan Smiley, Page Ostrow
Fat, Sick and Nearly Dead	2010	Joe Cross, Kurt Engfehr	Stacey Offman
Favela Rising	2006	Jeff Zimbalist and Matt Mochary	
Faye	2024	Laurent Bouzereau	Laurent Bouzereau, Markus Keith, Darryl Frank, Justin Falvey
Fear and Loathing on the Road to Hollywood	1978	Nigel Finch	Nigel Finch
Fear Itself	2015	Charlie Lyne	Anthony Ing, Catherine Bray, Charlie Lyne, Daniel O'Connor
Fear of 13, The	2015	David Sington	Christopher Riley, David Sington, Haroula Rose
Fear of a Black Republican	2011	Kevin Williams	
Fearless Freaks, The	2005	Bradley Beesley	
Feature, The	2008	Michel Auder, Andrew Neel	Ethan Palmer
Fed Up	2014	Stephanie Soechtig	Stephanie Soechtig, Sarah Olson, Eve Marson
Feels Good Man	2020	Arthur Jones	Giorgio Angelini, Caryn Capotosto, Arthur Jones, Aaron Wickenden
Feiyu Show	2014	Sun Hong	
Feminism WTF	2023	Katharina Mückstein	Katharina Mückstein, Nikolaus Geyrhalter, Markus Glaser, Michael Kitzberger, Michael Schindegger, Natalie Schwager, Wolfgang Widerhofer
Feminist on Cellblock Y, The	2018	Contessa Gayles	Contessa Gayles, Emma Lacey Bordeaux
Festival Express	2003	Bob Smeaton	
Festival panafricain d'Alger 1969	1969	William Klein	
Fiddler: A Miracle of Miracles	2019	Max Lewkowicz	Max Lewkowicz, Valerie Thomas, Patti Kerner, Rita Lerner, Ann Oster, Elena Berger-Melman, Christopher Massimine
Fidel: The Untold Story	2001	Estela Bravo	Alan Fountain, Silvia Steven
Fierce Light: When Spirit Meets Action	2008	Velcrow Ripper	Cherilyn Hawrysh, Gerry Flahive
Fig Trees	2009	John Greyson	John Greyson
Fight, The	2020	Eli Despres, Josh Kriegman, Elyse Steinberg	Eli Despres, Josh Kriegman, Elyse Steinberg, Peggy Drexler, Maya Seidler, Kerry Washington
Fight for the Planet	2009	Colin Carter	
Fight Life	2012	James Z. Feng	Seher Basak, James Z. Feng, James Y. Shih, Lanser Boint
Fighter	2000	Amir Bar-Lev	
Fighting Norway	1943	Sydney Newman	National Film Board of Canada
Fightville	2011	Michael Tucker, Petra Epperlein	Michael W. Gray, Rachel Schnipper
Film Portrait	1972	Jerome Hill	Barbara Stone, David C. Stone
Film Unfinished, A	2010	Yael Hersonski	Itai Ken-Tor, Philippa Kowarsky, Noemi Schory
Filming Othello	1978	Orson Welles	Juergen Hellwig, Klaus Hellwig
Filming The Trial	1981	Orson Welles	Orson Welles
Filmmaker	1968	George Lucas	Francis Ford Coppola
Filth and the Fury, The	2000	Julien Temple	Anita Camarata, Amanda Temple
Filthy Gorgeous: The Bob Guccione Story	2013	Barry Avrich	Mike Reid
Final Account	2020	Luke Holland	Luke Holland, John Battsek, Riete Oord
Final Cut for Orson, A	2018	Ryan Suffern	Frank Marshall, Filip Jan Rymsza
Final Journey, The	2010	R. J. Adams	Diane C. Adams
Final Quarter, The	2019	Ian Darling	
Final Score	2007	Soraya Nagasuwan	
Final Solution	2003		
Final Straw: Food, Earth, Happiness	2015	Patrick Lydon, Suhee Kang	
Final Year, The	2017	Greg Barker	John Battsek, Diane Becker, Alice Bristow, Christopher Buchanan
Finders Keepers	2015	Bryan Carberry and Clay Tweel	
Finding Dawn	2006	Christine Welsh	
Finding Kraftland	2006	Richard Kraft and Adam Shell	
Fine Food, Fine Pastries, Open 6 to 9	1989	David Petersen	David Petersen
Fire of Love	2022	Sara Dosa	Shane Boris, Sara Dosa, Ina Fichman
Fire Under the Snow	2008	Makoto Sasa	
Fires Were Started	1943	Humphrey Jennings	Ian Dalrymple
First Basket, The	2008	David Vyorst	David Vyorst
First Contact	1983	Bob Connolly and Robin Anderson	
First Film, The	2015	David Wilkinson	David Wilkinson
First Monday in May, The	2016	Andrew Rossi	Fabiola Beracasa Beckman, Sylvana Ward Durrett, Dawn Ostroff, Matthew Weaver, Skot Bright
First Orbit	2011	Christopher Riley	Christopher Riley
First Stripes	2018	Jean-François Caissy	
First We Eat	2020	Suzanne Crocker	Suzanne Crocker
Fish Meat	2012	Joe Cunningham	Ted Caplow
Fitna	2008		
The Five Obstructions	2003	Lars von Trier, Jørgen Leth	Peter Aalbæk Jensen, Vibeke Windeløv
Fixer: The Taking of Ajmal Naqshbandi	2009	Ian Olds	
Flamingos: Life After the Meteorite	2024	Lorenzo Hagerman	José Cohen
Flawed	2010	Andrea Dorfman	Annette Clarke
Flee	2021	Jonas Poher Rasmussen	Monica Hellström, Signe Byrge Sørensen
FLicKeR	2008	Nik Sheehan	Silva Basmajian, Maureen Judge
Flight 175: As the World Watched	2006		
Flight from Death	2003	Patrick Shen	Patrick Shen, Greg Bennick
Floored	2009	James Allen Smith	Joseph Gibbons, Steve Prosniewski, Karol Martesko
Flower in the Gun Barrel	2008	Gabriel Cowan	Gabriel Cowan, Amiee Clark, Monica Forouzesh
Fly	2024	Christina Clusiau, Shaul Schwarz	Shaul Schwarz
Flying Padre	1951	Stanley Kubrick	
Fog of War, The: Eleven Lessons from the Life of Robert S. McNamara	2003	Errol Morris	
Folktales	2025	Heidi Ewing, Rachel Grady	Heidi Ewing, Rachel Grady
Food and Country	2023	Laura Gabbert	Laura Gabbert, Caroline Libresco, Paula P. Manzanedo, Ruth Reichl, Lisa Remington
Food Chains	2014	Sanjay Rawal	Smriti Keshari, Hamilton Fish, Sanjay Rawal
Food, Inc.	2008	Robert Kenner	Robert Kenner, Elise Pearlstein
Food, Inc. 2	2023	Robert Kenner, Melissa Robledo	Michael Pollan, Eric Schlosser
Food Matters	2008	James Colquhoun, Carlo Ledesma	James Colquhoun, Laurentine Ten Bosch, Enzo Tedeschi
Food - Weapon of Conquest	1941	Stuart Legg	Stuart Legg
Football Under Cover	2008	David Assmann and Ayat Najafi	
For All Mankind	1989	Al Reinert	
For the Best and for the Onion	2008	Sani Elhadj Magori	Malam Saguirou
For the Bible Tells Me So	2007	Daniel G Karslake	
For the Love of a Man	2015	Rinku Kalsy	Joyojeet Pal
For the Love of Dolly	2006	Tai Uhlmann	Valerie Stadler
For the Love of Movies: The Story of American Film Criticism	2009	Gerald Peary	Amy Geller
For Which We Stand	2014	Sean Robinson	
Forbidden: Undocumented and Queer in Rural America	2016	Tiffany Rhynard	Tiffany Rhynard, Heather Mathews
Forbidden Fruit	2000	Sue Maluwa-Bruce	
Forbidden Lie$	2007	Anna Broinowski	
Forbidden Love: The Unashamed Stories of Lesbian Lives	1992	Lynne Fernie and Aerlyn Weissman	
Forbidden Team, The	2003	Rasmus Dinesen, Arnold Krøjgaard	Karim Stoumann, Joanna Din Mitchew
Forbidden Voices	2012	Barbara Miller	Philip Delaquis
Forever Activists: Stories from the Veterans of the Abraham Lincoln Brigade	1990	Connie Field, Judith Montell	Judith Montell
Forget Us Not	2013	Heather Connell	Heather Connell
Forgiving Dr. Mengele	2006	Bob Hercules, Cheri Pugh	Bob Hercules, Cheri Pugh
Forgotten Frontier, The	1931	Marvin Breckinridge Patterson	
Forks Over Knives	2011	Lee Fulkerson	John Corry, Brian Wendel
Fortunate Son	2011	Tony Asimakopoulos	Mila Aung-Thwin, Daniel Cross, Bob Moore
Foster Child	1987	Gil Cardinal	Jerry Krepakevich
Fotoamator	1998	Dariusz Jablonski	Dariusz Jablonski
Four Days in October	2010		Gary Waksman, David Gavant, David Check
Four Days in November	1964	Mel Stuart	Mel Stuart
Four Men in Prison	1950	Max Anderson	John Grierson
Fourteen Days in May	1987	Paul Hamann	Paul Hamann
Fourth Partition	2013	Adrian Prawica	
Fractured Land	2015	Fiona Rayher, Damien Gillis	Fiona Rayher, Damien Gillis
Fragile Trust, A	2013	Samantha Grant	Samantha Grant, Brittney Shepherd
Framing Agnes	2022	Chase Joynt	Samantha Curley, Shant Joshi
Francheska: Prairie Queen	2022	Laura O'Grady	Jenny Steele, Rosman Vallencia, Michelle Wong
Frantz Fanon, une vie, un combat, une œuvre	2001	Cheikh Djemai	
Freak Power: The Ballot or the Bomb	2020	Ajax Phillips, Daniel Joseph Watkins	Mimi Polk Gitlin, Ajax Phillips, Angus Wall, Daniel Joseph Watkins
Freakonomics	2010	Heidi Ewing, Alex Gibney, Seth Gordon, Rachel Grady, Eugene Jarecki, Morgan Spurlock	
Fred	2014	John Fitzgerald Keitel	John Fitzgerald Keitel
Fred Ott's Sneeze	1894	William K.L. Dickson	William K.L. Dickson
Frederick Douglass and the White Negro	2008	John J. Doherty	Catherine Lyons
Free Solo	2018	Elizabeth Chai Vasarhelyi, Jimmy Chin	Elizabeth Chai Vasarhelyi, Jimmy Chin, Evan Hayes, Shannon Dill
Free to Play	2014		
Freedom Downtime	2001	Emmanuel Goldstein	Emmanuel Goldstein
Freedom Fields	2018	Naziha Arebi	
A French Youth (Une jeunesse française)	2024	Jérémie Battaglia	
Fresh	2009	Ana Sofia Joanes	Ana Sofia Joanes
Frida	2024	Carla Gutierrez	Sara Bernstein, Loren Hammonds, Alexandra Johnes, Katie Maguire, Justin Wilkes
Frida, en trotjänarinna	1999	Marianne Gillgren	
Friedkin Uncut	2018	Francesco Zippel	Francesco Zippel, Federica Paniccia, Nicola Allieta
Friends of God: A Road Trip with Alexandra Pelosi	2007	Alexandra Pelosi	Alexandra Pelosi
From Bedrooms to Billions	2014	Anthony Caulfield, Nicola Caulfield	
From Darkness to Light	2024	Eric Friedler, Michael Lurie	Jeffrey Giles, Thore Vollert
From Ground Zero	2024	Aws Al-Banna, Ahmed Al-Danf, Basil Al-Maqousi, Mustafa Al-Nabih, Muhammad Alshareef, Ala Ayob, Bashar Al Balbisi, Alaa Damo, Awad Hana, Ahmad Hassunah, Mustafa Kallab, Satoum Kareem, Mahdi Karera, Rabab Khamees, Khamees Masharawi, Wissam Moussa, Tamer Najm, Abu Hasna Nidaa, Damo Nidal, Mahmoud Reema, Etimad Weshah, Islam Al Zrieai	Rashid Masharawi, Laura Nikolov, Omar Zúñiga
From Language to Language	2004	Nurith Aviv	Frederic Luzy
From Roger Moore with Love	2024	Jack Cocker	Karen Steyn
From Swastika to Jim Crow	2000	Lori Cheatle and Martin D. Toub	Steven Fischler and Joel Sucher
From the Sea to the Land Beyond	2012	Penny Woolcock	
Front Line	1981	David Bradbury	
Fritz: The Walter Mondale Story	2008	Melody Gilbert	Jan Selby
Fruit Hunters, The	2012	Yung Chang	
FUCK	2005	Steve Anderson	Steve Anderson
Fuck for Forest	2012	Michal Marczak	Mikolaj Pokromski, Michal Marczak
Full Circle	1993	Donna Read	Margaret Pettigrew
Full Tilt Boogie	1997	Sarah Kelly	Rana Joy Glickman
Funny Thing Happened on the Way to the Moon, A	2001	Bart Sibrel	
Fursonas	2016	Dominic Rodriguez	Olivia Vaughn
Future of Food, The	2004	Deborah Koons	
Future of Work and Death, The	2016	Sean Blacknell, Wayne Walsh	Sean Blacknell, Wayne Walsh

== G ==
† = Series

Title	Year	Director(s)	Producer(s)
Galapagos Affair, The: Satan Came to Eden	2013	Daniel Geller, Dayna Goldfine	Daniel Geller, Dayna Goldfine, Celeste Schaefer Snyder
Gambling, Gods and LSD	2002	Peter Mettler	Alexandra Rockingham Gill, Cornelia Seitler, Ingrid Veninger
Game Changers, The	2018	Louie Psihoyos	Joseph Pace, James Wilks
Game Face	2015	Michiel Thomas	Mark Schoen
Gaming in Color	2014	Philip Jones	Philip Jones, Ryan Paul, Anne Clements
Gang Cops	1998	Thomas B. Fleming, Daniel Marks	
Gang War: Bangin' In Little Rock	1994	Marc Levin	
Ganges: River to Heaven	2003	Gayle Ferraro	Gayle Ferraro
Ganja Queen	2007	Janine Hosking	
Garbage Warrior	2007	Oliver Hodge	Rachel Wexler
Garden, The	2008	Scott Hamilton Kennedy	
Gardener, The	2012	Mohsen Makhmalbaf	Mohsen Makhmalbaf
Garlic Is as Good as Ten Mothers	1980	Les Blank	Les Blank
Gasland	2010	Josh Fox	David Roma
Gate of Heavenly Peace, The	1995	Richard Gordon and Carma Hinton	
Gatekeepers, The	2012	Dror Moreh	Estelle Fialon, Philippa Kowarsky, Dror Moreh
Gates of Heaven	1978	Errol Morris	
Gather	2020	Sanjay Rawal	Sanjay Rawal, Tanya Meillier, Sterlin Harjo
Gaucho Americano	2021	Nicolás Molina	Joséphine Schroeder
Gay Marriage Thing, The	2005	Stephanie Higgins	Lorre Fritchy
Gay Sex in the 70s	2005	Joseph Lovett	Joseph Lovett
Gaza Strip	2002	James Longley	
Gaze of the Sea, The	2017	José Álvarez	José Álvarez, Julio Chavezmontes, Sumie Garcia, Carlos Paz, Ingmar Trost
Geeks	2004	Matthew Group	Matthew Group, Mitchell Group
Gendernauts	1999	Monika Treut	Monika Treut
Genghis Blues	1999	Roko Belic	
Genocide	1981	Arnold Schwartzman	Rabbi Marvin Hier, Arnold Schwartzman
Gente di Roma	2003	Ettore Scola	
George H.W. Bush	2008	Austin Hoyt	Austin Hoyt, Callie Taintor Wiser
George W. Bush	2020	Barak Goodman, Chris Durrance	Barak Goodman, Jamila Ephron, Chris Durrance
German Concentration Camps Factual Survey	1945		Sidney Bernstein
Get Lamp	2010	Jason Scott	Jason Scott
Get the Fire: Young Mormon Missionaries Abroad	2003	Nancy du Plessis	
Ghost Elephants	2025	Werner Herzog	Ariel Leon Isacovitch
Ghost in the Machine	2026	Valerie Veatch	Valerie Veatch
Ghost of Peter Sellers, The	2018	Peter Medak	Paul Iacovou
Ghosts in Our Machine, The	2013	Liz Marshall	Nina Beveridge, Liz Marshall
Ghosts of Abu Ghraib	2007	Rory Kennedy	Rory Kennedy, Liz Garbus, Jack Youngelson
Ghosts of the Abyss	2003	James Cameron	
Giant Buddhas, The	2005	Christian Frei	Christian Frei
Gilbert	2017	Neil Berkeley	Neil Berkeley, Maggie Contreras, David Heiman, James Leche
Gimme Shelter	1970	Albert Maysles, David Maysles, and Charlotte Zwerin	Porter Bibb and Ronnie Schneider
Girl 27	2007	David Stenn	
Girl in the River, A: The Price of Forgiveness	2015	Sharmeen Obaid-Chinoy	Tina Brown
Giuliani Time	2006	Kevin Keating	
Give Me the Ball!	2026	Liz Garbus, Elizabeth Wolff	Liz Garbus, Elizabeth Wolff, Dominic Crossley-Holland, Dan Cogan, Chris James, Gentry Kirby
Give Us Our Skeletons	1999	Paul-Anders Simma	
Glastonbury	2006	Julien Temple	Christopher Heary, Robert Richards
Glena	2014	Allan Luebke	Allan Luebke, Josh Leake, Eric Stolberg
Glitch in the Matrix, A	2021	Rodney Ascher	Ross M. Dinerstein
Global Steak: Demain nos enfants mangeront des criquets	2010	Anthony Orliange	
Glossary of Broken Dreams	2018	Johannes Grenzfurthner	Johannes Grenzfurthner, Günther Friesinger
GLOW: The Story of the Gorgeous Ladies of Wrestling	2012	Brett Whitcomb	Jason Connell, Brett Whitcomb
GMO OMG	2013	Jeremy Seifert	Elizabeth Kucinich
Go Further	2003	Ron Mann	
Go Tigers!	2001	Kenneth A. Carlson	Kenneth A. Carlson, Sidney Sherman
Go-Go Boys, The: The Inside Story of Cannon Films	2014	Hilla Medalia	Yariv Horowitz, Roy Lev, Hilla Medalia, Neta Zwebner-Zaibert
God & Country	2024	Dan Partland	Rob Reiner, Michele Singer, Steve Okin, Dan Partland
God Is American	2007	Richard Martin Jordan	
God Knows Where I Am	2016	Todd Wider, Jedd Wider	Todd Wider, Jedd Wider
God Makers, The	1982		
God Makers II, The	1993		
God on My Side	2006	Anita Jacoby	Jon Casimir and Anita Jacoby
God Rides a Harley	1987	Stavros C. Stavrides	Stavros C. Stavrides, Andreas Erne
God Who Wasn't There, The	2005	Brian Flemming	Brian Flemming, Amanda Jackson
God's Angry Man	1980	Werner Herzog	
God's Country	1985	Louis Malle	
God's Doorkeeper: St. André of Montreal	2010	Mary Rose Bacani	Gita Hosek
Goddess Bunny, The	1994	Nick Bougas	
Going Cardboard: A Board Game Documentary	2012	Lorien Green	Lorien Green
Going Clear: Scientology and the Prison of Belief	2015	Alex Gibney	Alex Gibney, Lawrence Wright, Kristen Vaurio
Going to Mars: The Nikki Giovanni Project	2023	Joe Brewster, Michèle Stephenson	Joe Brewster, Michèle Stephenson, Tommy Oliver
Going to Pieces: The Rise and Fall of the Slasher Film	2006	Jeff McQueen	Rachel Belofsky, Rudy Scalese
Going Upriver: The Long War of John Kerry	2004	George Butler	George Butler, Daniel Holton-Roth, Mark N. Hopkins, Sarah Scully
Gone Too Soon	2010	Ian Halperin	Ian Halperin
Gonzo: The Life and Work of Dr. Hunter S. Thompson	2008	Alex Gibney	
Good Copy Bad Copy	2007	Andreas Johnsen, Ralf Christensen, Henrik Moltke	Rosforth
Good Hair	2009	Jeff Stilson	Chris Rock Productions, HBO Films
Good Night Oppy	2022	Ryan White	Brandon Carroll, Justin Falvey, Darryl Frank, Matthew Goldberg, Jessica Hargrave, Ryan White
Goodbye Holland	2004	Willy Lindwer	Willy Lindwer
Goodbye Horses: The Many Lives of Q Lazzarus	2024	Eva Aridjis Fuentes	Howard Gertler
Goodbye Uncle Tom	1971	Gualtiero Jacopetti, Franco Prosperi	Gualtiero Jacopetti, Franco Prosperi
Google and the World Brain	2013	Ben Lewis	Fiona O'Doherty, Viva Van Loock, Bettina Walter
Google Me	2007	Jim Killeen	
Gordon Lightfoot: If You Could Read My Mind	2019	Martha Kehoe, Joan Tosoni	Martha Kehoe, Joan Tosoni
Gotoma the Buddha	1956	Rajbans Khanna	
Grace Lee Project, The	2005	Grace Lee	Grace Lee
Graham Hill: Driven	2008	Mark Craig	
Grain That Built a Hemisphere, The	1943	Bill Justice, Bill Roberts	
Grand Canyon	1958	James Algar	
Grand Theft Hamlet	2024	Sam Crane, Pinny Grylls	Julia Ton, Rebecca Wolff
Grandad of Races	1950	André de la Varre	Gordon Hollingshead
Granton Trawler	1934	John Grierson	
Grasslands Project, The †	2016	Scott Parker	David Christensen
Graphic Sexual Horror	2009	Anna Lorentzon, Barbara Bell	Anna Lorentzon, Barbara Bell, Alex Norden
Gray Matters	2014	Marco Orsini	
Great Ecstasy of Woodcarver Steiner, The	1974	Werner Herzog	Werner Herzog
Great Expectations	2007	Jesper Wachtmeister	Jonas Kellagher
Great Global Warming Swindle, The	2007	Martin Durkin	
Great Hack, The	2019	Karim Amer, Jehane Noujaim	Karim Amer, Geralyn Dreyfous, Judy Korin, Pedro Kos
Great Old Amusement Parks	1999	Rick Sebak	WQED Pittsburgh
Great Resistance, The	2007	Denys Desjardins	National Film Board of Canada
Great West End Theatres	2011	Marc Sinden	Jo Gilbert & Marc Sinden
Great White Death	1981	Jean-Patrick Lebel	
Greater Good, The	2011	Kendall Nelson, Chris Pilaro	
Greatest Night in Pop, The	2024	Bao Nguyen	Bruce Eskowitz, George Hencken, and others
Greatest Silence, The: Rape in the Congo	2008	Lisa F. Jackson	
Greenhouse Conspiracy, The	1990		
Greetings from Out Here	1993	Ellen Spiro	
Gregg Allman: The Music of My Soul	2026	James Keach	Michael Lehman, James Keach, Alexandra Komisaruk
Grey Area, The	2012	Noga Ashkenazi	Noga Ashkenazi
Grey Gardens	1976	Albert and David Maysles	
Gridiron Gang	1993	Lee Stanley	Linda Stanley, Lee Stanley
Gringo: The Dangerous Life of John McAfee	2016	Nanette Burstein	Chi-Young Park
Grizzly Man	2005	Werner Herzog	
Grompes, Curumi and The Papaya Girl	2023	Fernando Valdivia	Tania Medina, Evan Killick
GTFO	2015	Shannon Sun-Higginson	Shannon Sun-Higginson
Guantanamo Circus	2013	Christina Linhardt, Michael L. Rose	Christina Linhardt, Michael L. Rose
Guantanamo Trap, The	2011	Thomas Wallner	
Guantanamo's Child	2015	Patrick Reed, Michelle Shephard	Patrick Reed, Michelle Shephard, Peter Raymont
Guapo'y	2022	Sofía Paoli Thorne	Gabriela Cueto, Federico Pozzi, Sofía Paoli Thorne
Guerrilla: The Taking of Patty Hearst	2004	Robert Stone	Robert Stone
Guidelines	2014	Jean-François Caissy	
Guilty or Innocent of Using the N Word	2006	Bhavna Malkani	
Gunda	2020	Viktor Kossakovsky	Anita Rehoff Larsen
Gunner Palace	2005	Michael Tucker and Petra Epperlein	
Gunnin' for That No. 1 Spot	2008	Adam Yauch	
Gutbusters	2002		
Gypsy Davy	2011	Rachel Leah Jones	

== H ==
† = Series

Title	Year	Director(s)	Producer(s)
H*Commerce: The Business of Hacking You	2009	Seth Gordon	Moxie Pictures
H-2 Worker	1990	Stephanie Black	Stephanie Black
H. H. Holmes: America's First Serial Killer	2004	John Borowski	John Borowski
H2Omx	2013	José Cohen, Lorenzo Hagerman	José Cohen, Alejandra Liceaga
Hacker Wars, The	2014	Vivien Lesnik Weisman	Vivien Lesnik Weisman, Rico Hernandez, Joe Fionda
Hackers Are People Too	2008	Ashley Shwartau	Managed Mischieff, Flat Nine Studios
Hackers Wanted	Unreleased	Sam Bozzo	Dana Brunetti, Kevin Spacey
Hackers in Wonderland	2000	Russell Barnes	Russell Barnes
Hackers: Wizards of the Electronic Age	1985	Fabrice Florin	Fabrice Florin
Hacking Democracy	2006	Simon Ardizzone and Russell Michaels	
Hadwin's Judgement	2015	Sasha Snow	Elizabeth Yake, David Allen, David Christensen, Yves J. Ma
Haida Gwaii: On the Edge of the World	2015	Charles Wilkinson	Tina Schliessler, Charles Wilkinson, Kevin Eastwood, and Murray Battle
Hail! Hail! Rock 'n' Roll	1987	Taylor Hackford	
Hail Satan?	2019	Penny Lane	Gabriel Sedgwick
Hail to the Deadites	2020	Steve Villeneuve	Steve Villeneuve, Glen Alexander
Hal	2018	Amy Scott	Christine Beebe, Lisa Janssen, Jonathan Lynch, Brian Morrow
Half the Picture	2018	Amy Adrion	Amy Adrion, Jude Harris
Hamilius: Hip Hop Culture in Luxembourg	2010	Alain Tshinza	Raoul Nadalet
Hands on a Hard Body: The Documentary	1997	S.R. Bindler	
Hank Aaron: Chasing the Dream	1995	Michael Tollin	Fredric Golding
Hanging by a Wire	2026	Mohammed Ali Naqvi	Mohammed Ali Naqvi, Bilal Sami
Hangman's Graveyard	2009	Mick Grogan	Daniel Thomson
Happy Birthday Oscar Wilde	2004	Bill Hughes	Bill Hughes, Bernadine Carraher
Happy Clothes: A Film About Patricia Field	2023	Michael Selditch	Samuel Paul, Michael Selditch, Donald Zuckerman
Hard Name, A	2009	Alan Zweig	Kristina McLaughlin, Michael McMahon
Harlan County, USA	1976	Barbara Kopple	
Harry Chapin: When in Doubt, Do Something	2020	Rick Korn	Rick Korn
Harvest	1967		Carroll Ballard
Harvest, The	2010	U. Roberto Romano	U. Roberto Romano, Rory O'Connor
Harvest Shall Come, The	1942	Max Anderson	Basil Wright
Hate to Love: Nickelback	2023	Leigh Brooks	Ben Jones
Hatun Phaqcha, The Healing Land	2021	Delia Ackerman	Susana Bamonde, Margarita Morales Macedo
Haunted State: Theatre of Shadows	2017	Michael Brown	Michael Brown, Angela Olson
Have a Good Trip: Adventures in Psychedelics	2020	Donick Cary	Stuart Cornfeld, Jeremy Reitz, Mike Rosenstein, Ben Stiller, Jim Ziegler
Have You Seen Andy?	2001	Melanie Perkins	
Hayao Miyazaki and the Heron	2024	Kaku Arakawa	
He Dreams of Giants	2019	Keith Fulton, Louis Pepe	Keith Fulton, Louis Pepe
Heading Home: The Tale of Team Israel	2018	Seth Kramer, Daniel A. Miller, Jeremy Newberger	Jonathan Mayo, Seth Kramer, Daniel A. Miller, Jeremy Newberger
Heart of Stone	2009	Beth Toni Kruvant	
Heartbeat in the Brain	1970	Amanda Feilding	Amanda Feilding, Joey Mellen
Hearts and Minds	1974	Peter Davis	
Hearts of Darkness: A Filmmaker's Apocalypse	1991	Fax Bahr and George Hickenlooper	
Heaven	1987	Diane Keaton	Joe Kelly
Hebrews to Negroes: Wake Up Black America	2018	Ronald Dalton Jr.	Ronald Dalton Jr.
Heidi Fleiss: Hollywood Madam	1996	Nick Broomfield	
Heima	2007	Dean DeBlois	
Hell House	2002	George Ratliff	Zachary Mortensen, Devorah DeVries
Hell or Clean Water	2021	Cody Westman	Jennifer Hawley
Hell's Army	2026	Richard Rowley	Richard Rowley, Richard Butler, Atanas Georgiev, Caitlin McNally
Hell's Bells: The Dangers of Rock 'N' Roll	1989	Erik Hollander, Eric Holmberg	Erik Hollander, Eric Holmberg
Hellbound?	2012	Kevin Miller	Kevin Miller, David Rempel
Henri: The Last Pirate	2024	Julián Fernández Prieto	Dominique Rammsy Sánchez
Henry Browne, Farmer	1942		United States Department of Agriculture
Her Name Was Moviola	2024	Howard Berry	Howard Berry
Here Is Always Somewhere Else	2006	Rene Daalder	
Here One Day	2012	Kathy Leichter	Kathy Leichter
Herman's House	2012	Angad Singh Bhalla	Ed Barreveld, Loring McAlpin, Lisa Valencia-Svensson
Heroin(e)	2017	Elaine McMillion Sheldon	Elaine McMillion Sheldon, Kerrin Sheldon
Herring Hunt	1953	Julian Biggs	Guy Glover
Homecoming: A Film by Beyoncé	2019	Beyoncé	Steve Pamon, Erinn Williams
Hesburgh	2018	Patrick Creadon	Jerry Barca, Christine O'Malley
Het is een schone dag geweest	1993	Jos de Putter	
Hidden Pearl, The: The Syrian Orthodox Church And Its Ancient Aramaic Heritage	2001		
High & Low – John Galliano	2023	Kevin Macdonald	Kevin Macdonald, Chloe Mamelok
High Plains Doctor: Healing on the Tibetan Plateau	2012	Michael Oved Dayan	Michael Oved Dayan
High School	1968	Frederick Wiseman	
High School Musical: The Music in You	2007	Barbara Kopple	
High Schools	1984	Charles Guggenheim	Charles Guggenheim, Nancy Sloss
Highway of Tears	2015	Matthew Smiley	Carly Pope
Hijab: Mulheres de véu	2013	Paulo Halm	Paulo Halm
Hijacking Catastrophe: 9/11, Fear & the Selling of American Empire	2004	Jeremy Earp, Sut Jhally	
Hillary: The Movie	2008	Alan Peterson	Alan Peterson
Hillary's America: The Secret History of the Democratic Party	2016	Dinesh D'Souza, Bruce Schooley	Gerald R. Molen
Hindenburg: The Untold Story	2007	Sean Grundy	Vicky Matthews
Hineini: Coming Out in a Jewish High School	2005	Irena Fayngold	Irena Fayngold
Hip-Hop: Beyond Beats and Rhymes	2006	Byron Hurt	
Hippie Masala: Forever in India	2006	Ulrich Grossenbacher, Damaris Lüthi	
History of Concrete, The	2026	John Wilson	Clark Filio, Shirel Kozak, Allie Viti
History of the Blue Movie, A	1970	Alex de Renzy	
History of the Eagles	2013	Alison Ellwood	Alex Gibney
Hit & Stay	2013	Joe Tropea, Skizz Cyzyk	Joe Tropea
Holes in My Shoes	2006	David Wachs	David Wachs
Hollywood Chinese: The Chinese in American Featured Films	2007	Arthur Dong	
Hollywoodgate	2023	Ibrahim Nash’at	Talal Derki, Odessa Rae, Shane Boris
Holy Family Album, The	1991	Jo Ann Kaplan	John Ellis
Holy Ghost	2014	Darren Wilson	Braden Heckman, Darren Wilson
Holy Ghost People	1967	Peter Adair	Blair Boyd
Holy Hell	2016	Will Allen	Will Allen, Tracey Harnish, Alexandra Johnes
Holy Land Hardball	2008	Brett Rapkin, Erik Kesten	Brett Rapkin, Erik Kesten
Holy Wars	2010	Stephen Marshall	
Holy Water-Gate: Abuse Cover-up in the Catholic Church	2004	Mary Healey Jamiel	Mary Healey Jamiel
Home	2009	Yann Arthus-Bertrand	Denis Carot and Luc Besson
Home Is Somewhere Else	2022	Carlos Hagerman, Jorge Villalobos	Carlos Hagermnan, Guillermo Rendón, Jorge Villalobos
Home of the Brave	2004	Paola di Florio	
Home on the Range, A: The Jewish Chicken Ranchers of Petaluma	2002	Bonnie Burt, Judith Montell	Bonnie Burt, Judith Montell
Home Page	1999	Doug Block	Doug Block, Esther Robinson, Jane Weiner
Homegoings	2013	Christine Turner	
Homestretch, The	2014	Anne de Mare, Kirsten Kelly	Anne de Mare, Kirsten Kelly
Honest Man: The Life of R. Budd Dwyer	2010	James Dirschberger	Matt Levie, James Dirschberger
Honeyland	2019	Tamara Kotevska, Ljubomir Stefanov	Atanas Georgiev
Honor Diaries	2013	Micah Smith	Paula Kweskin, Heidi Basch-Harod, Alex Traiman
Honour Me	2008	Alex Tweddle	
Hood 2 Hood: The Blockumentary	2005	Aquis Bryant	Aquis Bryant
Hoop Dreams	1994	Steve James	Steve James, Frederick Marx, and Peter Gilbert
Hooping Life, The	2010	Amy Goldstein	Amy Goldstein, Anouchka van Riel
Hope in Heaven	2006	Meredith Ralston	
Horror Noire: A History of Black Horror	2019	Xavier Burgin	Ashlee Blackwell, Danielle Burrows
Horse with the Flying Tail, The	1960	Larry Lansburgh	Larry Lansburgh
Hot Girls Wanted	2015	Jill Bauer and Ronna Gradus	Rashida Jones, Jill Bauer, Ronna Gradus, and Brittany Huckabee
Hotel Ground Zero	2009		
Hotel Terminus: The Life and Times of Klaus Barbie	1988	Marcel Ophuls	Marcel Ophuls
House of Numbers: Anatomy of an Epidemic	2009	Brent Leung	Brent Leung, Ursula Rowan
How Much Wood Would a Woodchuck Chuck	1976	Werner Herzog	Werner Herzog
How to Change the World	2015	Jerry Rothwell	Al Morrow and Bous de Jong
How to Come Alive With Norman Mailer	2024	Jeff Zimbalist	Victoria Marquette, Jeff Zimbalist
How to Die in Oregon	2011	Peter Richardson	Peter Betty
How to Make Money Selling Drugs	2012	Matthew Cooke	Bert Marcus, Adrian Grenier
How to Rob a Bank	2024	Stephen Robert Morse, Seth Porges	Stephen Robert Morse, Seth Porges, Max Peltz, Maxim Gertler-Jaffe
Howard	2018	Don Hahn	Lori Korngiebel, Jonathan Polenz
Huey Long	1986	Ken Burns	Ken Burns, Richard Kilberg
Huie's Sermon	1981	Werner Herzog	Werner Herzog
Huldufólk 102	2006	Nisha Inalsingh	Nisha Inalsingh, Júlíus Kemp, Ingvar Þórðarson
Human	2015	Yann Arthus-Bertrand	
Human Adventure, The †	1997	Various directors	
Human Harvest	2014	Leon Lee	
Human Pyramid, The	1961	Jean Rouch	Pierre Braunberger
Hunter From Elsewhere – A Journey With Helen Britton	2021	Elena Alvarez Lutz	Elena Alvarez Lutz
Hunting Ground, The	2015	Kirby Dick	Amy Ziering
Hunting of the President, The	2004	Nickolas Perry, Harry Thomason	Douglas Jackson
HURT BUSINE$$, THE	2016	Vlad Yudin	Edwin Mejia, Vlad Yudin
Hyperland	1990		Max Whitby

== I ==
† = Series

Title	Year	Director(s)	Producer(s)
I Am Ready, Warden	2024	Smriti Mundhra	Smriti Mundhra, Maya Gnyp, Nina Aujla, Keri Blakinger
I, Curmudgeon	2004	Alan Zweig	
I'd Like You to Live My Youth Again	2022	Nicolás Guzmán	Francisca Soto, Roberto Doveris, Alicia Scherson
I'm Chevy Chase and You're Not	2026	Marina Zenovich	P. G. Morgan, Isabel San Vargas, Austin Wilkin
I'm Cris from Tierra Bomba	2023	Josephine Landertinger Forero	
I Am	2010	Tom Shadyac	Jennifer Abbott, Dagan Handy
I Am an Animal: The Story of Ingrid Newkirk and PETA	2007	Matthew Galkin	
I Am Bruce Lee	2012	Pete McCormack	Derik Murray, John Barbisan
I Am: Celine Dion	2024	Irene Taylor	Stacy Lorts, Tom Mackay, Julie Begey Seureau, Irene Taylor
I Am Chris Farley	2015	Brent Hodge, Derik Murray	Derik Murray, Kevin Farley, Tim Gamble, Paul Gertz, Robert Pirooz, David Reeder
I Am Dale Earnhardt	2015	Jeff Cvitkovic	Jason Allison
I Am Divine	2013	Jeffrey Schwarz	Jeffrey Schwarz, Jon Glover, Lance Robertson, Lotti Pharriss Knowles
I Am Heath Ledger	2017	Derik Murray, Adrian Buitehuis	Derik Murray
I Am Nancy	2011	Arlene Marechal	Heather Langenkamp, Arlene Marechal
I Am the Media	2010	Benjamin Rassat	
I Am Your Father	2015	Marcos Cabota, Toni Bestard	Paula Serra
I Could Never Go Vegan	2024	Thomas Pickering	Lock The Tent Productions, Memphis James Pictures
I Don't Hate Las Vegas Anymore	1994	Caveh Zahedi	Henry S. Rosenthal
I Knew It Was You: Rediscovering John Cazale	2009	Richard Shepard	Brett Ratner, Stacey Reiss, Richard Shepard
I Know Catherine, the Log Lady	2025	Richard Green	Richard Green, Jenny Sullivan
I Missed Flight 93	2006		
I Like Killing Flies	2004	Matt Mahurin	Matt Mahurin
I Love the Sound of the Kalachnikov It Reminds Me of Tchaikovsky	2001	Philippe Vartan Khazarian	
I Lost My Mom (J'ai placé ma mère)	2022	Denys Desjardins	Denys Desjardins
I Still Worship Zeus	2004	Jamil Said	Elaine Goffas, Jamil Said
I Thought I Told You to Shut Up!!	2015	Charlie Tyrell	Trevor Duwyn, Andrew Ferguson, Matt King
I'm Almost Not Crazy: John Cassavetes, the Man and His Work	1989	Michael Ventura	Yoram Globus, Menahem Golan
ID–WithoutColors	2013	Riccardo Valsecchi	Migrationsrat Berlin-Brandenburg
If a Tree Falls: A Story of the Earth Liberation Front	2011	Marshall Curry	Marshall Curry, Sam Cullman
If These Walls Could Sing	2022	Mary McCartney	John Battsek, Sarah Thomson, Miles Coleman
If You Build It	2013	Patrick Creadon	Neal Baer, Christine O'Malley
Iluminados	2024	Ricardo Jhon	Ricardo Jhon, Jhonatan Díaz
Imaginary Witness	2004	Daniel Anker	Daniel Anker, Ellin Baumel
Imagine: John Lennon	1988	Andrew Solt	George Martin
Imagining Indians	1992	Victor Masayesva, Jr	Victor Masayesva, Jr
Importance of Being Icelandic, The	1998	Jon Einarsson Gustafsson and Marc Stephenson	
Impossible Itself, The	2010	Jacob Adams	Jacob Adams, Alan Mandell
Imposter, The	2012	Bart Layton	Dimitri Doganis
In Bad Taste	2000	Steve Yeager	
In Bob We Trust	2013	Lynn-Maree Milburn	Richard Lowenstein, Maya Gnyp, Andrew de Groot, Lynn-Maree Milburn
In Her Footsteps	2017	Rana Abu Fraiha	
In My Mind	2017	Chris Rodley	Tim Beddows, Joseph D'Morais, Chris Rodley
In Prison My Whole Life	2007	Marc Evans	Livia Giuggioli, Nick Goodwin Self
In Satmar Custody	2003	Nitzan Gilady	
In Search of Darkness	2019	David A. Weiner	David A. Weiner, Jessica Dwyer, Heather Wixson
In Search of Darkness: Part II	2020	David A. Weiner	David A. Weiner, Jessica Dwyer, and others
In Search of the Nile	2003	Stéphane Bégoin	Arnaud Hantute, Maurice Ribière
In Search of the Second Amendment	2006	David T. Hardy	
In Search of Tomorrow	2022	David A. Weiner	David A. Weiner, Heather Wixson, and others
In the Basement	2014	Ulrich Seidl	
In the Bathtub of the World	2001	Caveh Zahedi	
In the Beginning There Was Light	2010	P.A. Straubinger	Helmut Grasser
In the Flesh: three lives in prostitution	2003	Bishakha Datta	Bishakha Datta
In the Game	2015	Maria Finitzo, Bob Hercules	Maria Finitzo, Mary Morrissette
In the Land of the Head Hunters	1914	Edward S. Curtis	Edward S. Curtis
In the Name of the Family	2010	Shelley Saywell	Habiba Nosheen, Deborah Parks, Shelley Saywell
In the Realm of the Hackers	2003	Kevin Anderson	Franco di Chiera
In the Same Breath	2021	Nanfu Wang	
In the Shadow of the Moon	2006	David Sington	Dr. Duncan Copp
Incident at Oglala	1992	Michael Apted	Arthur Chobanian
Inconsistent Truth, An	2012	Shayne Edwards	Phil Valentine
Inconvenient Sequel: Truth to Power, An	2017	Bonni Cohen, Jon Shenk	Jeffrey Skoll, Richard Berge, Diane Weyermann
Inconvenient Truth, An	2006	Davis Guggenheim	
Inconvenient Truth...Or Convenient Fiction?, An	2007	Leesa Kelly, Tim Donner	
India in a Day	2016	Richie Mehta	Jack Arbuthnott, Cassandra Sigsgaard
India's Forbidden Love	2018	Sadhana Subramanian	Jon Drever, Orlando von Einsiedel
Indian Priest, The	2016	Mattias Löw	Mattias Löw
Indie Game: The Movie	2012	James Swirsky, Lisanne Pajot	James Swirsky, Lisanne Pajot
Indoctrinate U	2007	Evan Coyne Maloney	Blaine Greenberg, Stuart Browning, Thor Halvorssen
Ingmar Bergman Makes a Movie	1963	Vilgot Sjöman	
Ingredients: The Local Food Movement Takes Root	2009	Robert Bates	Brian Kimmel
Inner Worlds Outer Worlds	2012	Daniel Schmidt	Daniel Schmidt
Innisfree	1990	José Luis Guerín	Paco Poch
Innocence	2005	Areeya Chumsai and Nisa Kongsri	
Inquiring Nuns	1968	Gerald Temaner, Gordon Quinn	
Inshallah, Kashmir	2012	Ashvin Kumar	Ashvin Kumar
Inside 9/11	2011		
Inside Deep Throat	2005	Fenton Bailey and Randy Barbato	
Inside Islam	2002	Mark Hufnail	
Inside Job	2010	Charles H. Ferguson	
Inside Lara Roxx	2011	Mia Donovan	Mia Donovan, Mila Aung-Thwin, Daniel Cross
Inside Mecca	2003	Anisa Mehdi	
Inside the Square	2009	David Michod	Luke Doolan, Nash Edgerton, Louise Smith
Insignificant Man, An	2016	Khushboo Ranka, Vinay Shukla	Anand Gandhi, Khushboo Ranka, Vinay Shukla and Vinay Rohira
Institute, The	2013	Spencer McCall	
Insurrectionist Next Door, The	2023	Alexandra Pelosi	Alexandra Pelosi
Intercepted	2024	Oksana Karpovych	Rocío Barba Fuentes, Giacomo Nudi
Internet's Own Boy, The: The Story of Aaron Swartz	2014	Brian Knappenberger	Brian Knappenberger
Interrupters, The	2011	Steve James	Steve James, Alex Kotlowitz, Zak Piper
Intersexion	2012	Grant Lahood	John Keir
Into Great Silence	2005	Philip Gröning	Philip Gröning
Into the Abyss	2011	Werner Herzog	Erik Nelson
Into the Arms of Strangers: Stories of the Kindertransport	2000	Mark Jonathan Harris	Deborah Oppenheimer
Into the Deep: America, Whaling & the World	2010	Ric Burns	Bonnie Lafave, Mary Recine, Robin Espinola, Ric Burns
Introducing, Selma Blair	2021	Rachel Fleit	Mickey Liddell, Pete Shilaimon, Troy Nankin
Invasion of the Scream Queens	1992	Donald Farmer	
Investigating Tarzan	1997	Alain d' Aix	Nathalie Barton
Investigation into the Invisible World	2002	Jean-Michel Roux	Marc Baschet, Mathieu Bompoint, Frédérique Dumas-Zajdela
Invisible Children	2003	Jason Russell, Bobby Bailey, and Laren Poole	
Invisible City	2009	Hubert Davis	Mehernaz Lentin, Gerry Flahive, Hubert Davis
Invisible War, The	2012	Kirby Dick	Amy Ziering, Tanner King Barklow
I.O.U.S.A.	2008	Patrick Creadon	Christine O'Malley
Iran: Hot Tea, Cool Conversations	2008	Brenden Hamilton	Brenden Hamilton
Iran Is Not the Problem	2008	Aaron Newman	
Iranian Taboo	2011	Reza Allamehzadeh	Mansour Taeed, Bijan Shahmoradi
Iraq for Sale: The War Profiteers	2006	Robert Greenwald	
Iraq in Fragments	2007	James Longley	
Iron Maiden: Flight 666	2009	Scot McFadyen, Sam Dunn	Scot McFadyen, Sam Dunn
Iron Maiden: Burning Ambition	2026	Malcolm Venville	Dominic Freeman
Iron Winter	2025	Kasimir Burgess	Ben Golotta, Morgan Wright, Chris Kamen, Enebish Sengemugaa
Is Genesis History?	2017	Thomas Purifoy Jr.	
Isaac in America: A Journey with Isaac Bashevis Singer	1986	Amram Nowak	Kirk Simon, Amram Nowak
Islam: Empire of Faith†	2000	Robert H. Gardner	
Islam: What the West Needs to Know	2006	Gregory M. Davis, Bryan Daly	Gregory M. Davis, Bryan Daly
Islamic Art: Mirror of the Invisible World	2012	Robert H. Gardner	Oleg Grabar, Mohamed Zakariya
Islamic State, The	2014	Shane Smith	
Island of Roses: The Jews of Rhodes in Los Angeles	1995	Gregori Viens	Oleg Grabar
Island President, The	2011	Jon Shenk	Richard Berge, Bonni Cohen
Island Soldier	2017	Nathan Fitch	Bryan Chang, Fivel Rothberg
It Might Get Loud	2008	Davis Guggenheim	Jimmy Page
It Wasn't A Dream, It Was A Flood	1974	Frank Stanford, Irving Broughton	
It's All Gonna Break	2024	Stephen Chung	Ann Shin, Diana Warme
It's All True: Based on an Unfinished Film by Orson Welles	1993	Bill Krohn, Myron Meisel, Richard Wilson	Régine Konckler, Bill Krohn, Myron Meisel, Jean-Luc Ormières, Richard Wilson
It's My Country Too: Muslim Americans	2005	Clifford Bestall	Ruhi Hamid
It's Never Over, Jeff Buckley	2025	Amy J. Berg	Amy J. Berg, Ryan Heller, Christine Connor, Mandy Chang, Jennie Bedusa, Matthew Roozen
Italy in a Day	2014	Gabriele Salvatores	
Ito: A Diary of an Urban Priest	2010	Pirjo Honkasalo	
Ivory Game, The	2016	Richard Ladkani, Kief Davidson	Walter Köhler, Kief Davidson, Wolfgang Knöpfler
IX XI	2026	Sean Wilsey	Sean Wilsey, Krista Parris

== J ==
† = **Series**

Title	Year	Director(s)	Producer(s)
Jabe Babe – A Heightened Life	2005	Janet Merewether	
Jago: A Life Underwater	2015	James Reed	Johnny Langenheim, James McAleer, James Morgan, James Reed, Elisabeth A.M. Yusef
Jane Elliott Against the World	2026	Judd Ehrlich	Judd Ehrlich, Max Powers, Elena Gaby
Jane Fonda in Five Acts	2018	Susan Lacy	Susan Lacy, Jessica Levin, Emma Pildes
Jane Goodall: Reasons for Hope	2023	David Lickley	David Lickley
Jasper Mall	2020	Bradford Thomason, Brett Whitcomb	Bradford Thomason, Brett Whitcomb
Jaws @ 50: The Definitive Inside Story	2025	Laurent Bouzereau	Laurent Bouzereau, Wendy Benchley, Laura A. Bowling, Darryl Frank, Markus Keith
Jerry Lee Lewis: Trouble in Mind	2022	Ethan Coen	Peter Afterman, T Bone Burnett, Steve Bing, Mick Jagger, Victoria Pearman
Je suis Charlie	2015	Emmanuel Leconte, Daniel Leconte	Daniel Leconte
Jesus Camp	2006	Rachel Grady and Heidi Ewing	
Jesus Music, The	2021	Erwin brothers	Brandon Gregory, Josh Walsh
Jews and Baseball: An American Love Story	2010	Peter Miller	Will Hechter, Peter Miller
Jews and Buddhism: Belief Amended, Faith Revealed	1999	Bill Chayes, Isaac Solotaroff	
JFK: 3 Shots That Changed America	2009	Nicole Rittenmeyer, Seth Skundrick	Katerina Simic, Hugo Soskin, Elizabeth Tyson
JFK: The Lost Bullet	2013		
Jihad: A Story of the Others	2015	Deeyah Khan	Darin Prindle, Andrew Smith
Jihad for Love, A	2007	Parvez Sharma	Sandi DuBowski and Parvez Sharma
Jill & Tony Curtis Story, The	2008	Ian Ayres	Eric Ellena
Jim: The James Foley Story	2016	Brian Oakes	George Kunhardt, Teddy Kunhardt, Eva Lipman
Jim in Bold	2003	Glenn Holsten	Frank Pavich, Stephen Scarlata, Travis Stevens
Jimmy Carter	2002	Adriana Bosch	Adriana Bosch, David Condon
Jiro Dreams of Sushi	2011	David Gelb	Kevin Iwashina, Tom Pellegrini
JLG/JLG – Self-Portrait in December	1995	Jean-Luc Godard	Jean-Luc Godard
JO1 the Movie: Unfinished - Go to the Top	2022	Tetsuro Inagaki	Yusuke Kitahashi, Masaya Shibuwasa, Hiroshi Tamura
Joan Baez: I Am a Noise	2023	Miri Navasky, Maeve O'Boyle, Karen O'Connor	Miri Navasky, Karen O'Connor
Joanna	2013	Aneta Kopacz	
Jobriath A.D.	2012	Kieran Turner	Kieran Turner
Jodorowsky's Dune	2013	Frank Pavich	Frank Pavich, Stephen Scarlata, Travis Stevens
John and Abigail Adams	2006	Peter Jones	Elizabeth Deane
John Candy: I Like Me	2025	Colin Hanks	Colin Hanks, Johnny Pariseau, George Dewey, Shane Reid, Ryan Reynolds, Sean M. Stuart, Glen Zipper
John F. Kennedy: Years of Lightning, Day of Drums	1966	Bruce Herschensohn	George Stevens Jr.
John Lewis: Good Trouble	2020	Dawn Porter	Laura Michalchyshyn, Dawn Porter, Erika Alexander, Ben Arnon
John Lilly and the Earth Coincidence Control Office	2025	Michael Almereyda, Courtney Stephens	Michael Almereyda, Taylor Hess, Jesse Miller, Courtney Stephens
Jonestown: The Life and Death of Peoples Temple	2006	Stanley Nelson	Stanley Nelson
Journey Back to Youth	2001	Alexander Gutman, Sergei Litviakov	
Journey from Zanskar	2010	Frederick Marx	Frederick Marx
Journey of Javier Heraud, The	2019	Javier Corcuera	
Journey of Monalisa, The	2019	Nicole Costa	Daniela Camino, Rocío Romero
Journey to Le Mans	2014	Charlotte Fantelli	Charlotte Fantelli
Journey to Mecca: In the Footsteps of Ibn Battuta	2009	Bruce Neibaur	Taran Davies, Dominic Cummingham-Reid, Jonathan Barker
Journey to the Edge of the Universe	2008	Yavar Abbas	John Vandervelde
Journey's End	2010	Jean-François Caissy	Jean-François Caissy
Journeys with George	2003	Alexandra Pelosi, Aaron Lubarsky	Alexandra Pelosi, Aaron Lubarsky
Joy Division	2007	Grant Gee	Tom Astor, Tom Atencio, Jacqui Edenbrow
Joy of Life, The	2005	Jenni Olson	Scott Noble, Julie Dorf
Judge and the General, The	2008	Elizabeth Farnsworthe and Patricio Lanfranco Leverton	
Julian Bond: Reflections from the Frontlines of the Civil Rights Movement	2012	Eduardo Montes-Bradley	Heritage Film Project
June 17th, 1994	2010	Brett Morgen	
Jungle, The	1967	Charlie 'Brown' Davis, Jimmy 'Country' Robinson, David 'Bat' Williams	
Junket Whore	1998	Debbie Melnyk	
Just Another Missing Kid	1981	John Zaritsky	Glenn Sarty, John Zaritsky
Just, Melvin: Just Evil	2000	James Ronald Whitney	
Just Watch Me: Trudeau and the '70s Generation	1999	Catherine Annau	
Juvenile Liaison	1975	Nick Broomfield	

== K ==
† = Series

Title	Year	Director(s)	Producer(s)
kære legetøj, Det	1968	Gabriel Axel	Gabriel Axel
Kage no Hikari	2007	Vincent Guilbert	Aokarasu
Karajan: The Maestro and His Festival	2017	Hannes Michael Schalle	
Karamoja	1954	William B. Treutle	Kroger Babb
Kate Plays Christine	2016	Robert Greene	Susan Bedusa
Katiyabaaz	2013	Deepti Kakkar, Fahad Mustafa	
Katy Perry: Part of Me	2012	Dan Cutforth, Jane Lipsitz	Brian Grazer, Katy Perry, Steven Jensen
Kedi	2016	Ceyda Torun	Ceyda Torun, Charlie Wuppermann
Keep the River on Your Right: A Modern Cannibal Tale	2000	David Shapiro, Laurie Gwen Shapiro	
Khartoum	2025	Anas Saeed, Rawia Alhag, Ibrahim Snoopy Ahmad, Timeea Mohamed Ahmed, Philip Cox	Giovanna Stopponi, Talal Afifi
Kid Stays in the Picture, The	2002	Nanette Burstein and Brett Morgen	Brett Morgan and Nanette Burstein
Kids for Cash	2013	Robert May	Lauren Timmons, Robert May, Poppy Das
Kids Menu, The	2016	Kurt Engfehr	Jamin Mendelsohn
Kids of the Majestic	2009	Dylan Verrechia	Suhas Radhakrishna, Dylan Verrechia
Killer Legends	2014	Joshua Zeman	Rachel Mills
Killer's Paradise	2007	Giselle Portenier	Giselle Portenier
Killing for Love	2016	Marcus Vetter, Karin Steinberger	Marcus Vetter, Louise Rosen, Ulf Meyer
Killing in the Name	2010	Jed Rothstein	Jed Rothstein, Jessica Van Garsse, Rory Kennedy, Liz Garbus
Killing Kasztner: The Jew who Dealt with the Nazis	2008	Gaylen Ross	
Killing Michael Jackson	2019	Sam Eastall	Sam Eastall
Killing of America, The	1982	Sheldon Renan, Leonard Schrader	Leonard Schrader, Mataichirô Yamamoto
Killswitch	2014	Ali Akbarzadeh	Jeffrey Horn
Kim's Video	2023	David Redmon, Ashley Sabin	Francesco Galavotti, David Redmon, Ashley Sabin, Dale Smith, Deborah Smith, Rebecca Tabasky
Kim Novak's Vertigo	2025	Alexandre O. Philippe	Terri Piñon
Kimjongilia	2009	N.C. Heikin	
King Corn	2007	Aaron Woolf	Aaron Woolf, Ian Cheney, Curt Ellis
King, The – Jari Litmanen	2012	Arto Koskinen	Mika Kaurismäki
King of Arcades, The	2014	Sean Tiedeman	Krystle-Dawn Willing, Eric Tessler, Adam F. Goldberg
King of Kong, The: A Fistful of Quarters	2007	Seth Gordon	Ed Cunningham
King on Screen	2022	Daphné Baiwir	Sebastien Cruz
King Gimp	1999	William Whiteford	William Whiteford
Kings of Pastry	2009	Chris Hegedus, D. A. Pennebaker	Frazer Pennebaker, Flora Lazar
Kings of the Turf	1941	Del Frazier	
Kink	2013	Christina Voros	James Franco
KJB: The Book That Changed the World	2011	Norman Stone	Norman Stone
Knife: The Attempted Murder of Salman Rushdie	2026	Alex Gibney	Erin Edeiken, Alex Gibney, Sruthi Pinnamaneni
Knife Skills	2017	Thomas Lennon	
Knock Down the House	2019	Rachel Lears	Rachel Lears, Robin Blotnick, Sarah Olson
Knocking	2006	Joel Engardio, Tom Shepard	
Know Your Mushrooms	2008	Ron Mann	Ron Mann
Knuckleball!	2012	Ricki Stern, Anne Sundberg	Dan Cogan, Christine Schomer, Ricki Stern, Anne Sundberg
Koch	2012	Neil Barsky	Jenny Carchman, Lindsey Megrue
Koko: A Talking Gorilla	1978	Barbet Schroeder	Margaret Ménégoz
Kokoda Front Line	1942	Ken G. Hall and Damien Parer	
Kokomo City	2023	D. Smith	D. Smith, Harris Doran, Bill Butler
Kokoyakyu: High School Baseball	2006	Kenneth Eng	Alex Shear, Takayo Nagasawa
Kon-Tiki	1950	Thor Heyerdahl	Olle Nordemar
Kony 2012	2012	Jason Russell	Kimmy Vandivort, Heather Longerbeam, Chad Clendinen, Noelle Jouglet
Koundi et le jeudi national	2010	Ariani Astrid Atodji	Goethe Institut
Koyaanisqatsi: Life out of Balance	1983	Godfrey Reggio	
Kroonjuwelen - Hard Times, Good Times, Better Times	2006		
Kubrick by Kubrick	2020	Gregory Monro	Martin Laurent, Jeremy Zelnik
Kumaré	2011	Vikram Gandhi	Bryan Carmel, Brendan Colthurst
Kurt and Courtney	1998	Nick Broomfield	
Kurt Cobain: Montage of Heck	2015	Brett Morgen	Danielle Renfrew Behrens and Brett Morgen
Kurt Vonnegut: Unstuck in Time	2021	Robert B. Weide, Don Argott	Robert B. Weide

== L ==
† = Series

Title	Year	Director(s)	Producer(s)
L7: Pretend We're Dead	2016	Sarah Price	Maria Aceves, Bob Fagan
L'Enfer d'Henri-Georges Clouzot	2009	Serge Bromberg	
LA 92	2017	Daniel Lindsay, T. J. Martin	Jonathan Chinn, Simon Chinn, Sarah Gibson
La Mémoire maritime des arabes	2000	Khal Torabully	Chamarel Films, Productions La Lanterne
La Montagne infidèle	1923	Jean Epstein	Pathé Frères
Laatste Zeven Maanden van Anne Frank	1988	Willy Lindwer	
Ladies & Gentlemen... 50 Years of SNL Music	2025	Questlove, Oz Rodriguez	Oz Rodriguez
Lake, The	2026	Abby Ellis	Fletcher Keyes, Abby Ellis
Lake of Fire	2006	Tony Kaye	
Lal Galiyare Se	2013		DD News
LaLee's Kin: The Legacy of Cotton	2001	Deborah Dickson, Susan Frömke, and Albert Maysles	
Land of Silence and Darkness	1971	Werner Herzog	Werner Herzog Filmproduktion
Language Matters with Bob Holman	2015	David Grubin	David Grubin, Bob Holman
Langue sacrée, langue parlée	2008	Nurith Aviv	
Last Assyrians, The	2004	Robert Alaux	Francois Le Bayon, Robert Alaux
Last Blockbuster, The	2020	Taylor Morden	Zeke Kamm
Last Breath	2019	Richard da Costa	
Last Campaign of Governor Booth Gardner, The	2009	Daniel Junge	Henry Ansbacher, Davis Coombe
Last Cruise, The	2021	Hannah Olson	Hannah Olson, Shane Boris, Joe Beshenkovsky, James A. Smith
Last Day of the Dinosaurs	2010	Richard Dale	
Last Days in Vietnam	2014	Rory Kennedy	Rory Kennedy, Keven McAlester
Last Days of Left Eye, The	2007	Lauren Lazin	
Last Days of Michael Jackson, The	2018		Mark Anstendig, Monica DelaRosa
Last Days on Lake Trinity	2025	Charlotte Cooley	Nick Ramey, Charlotte Cooley
Last First, The: Winter K2	2026	Amir Bar-Lev	John Battsek, Howard T. Owens, Sean Richard, Ben Silverman, Sarah Thomson
Last Journey, The	2024	Filip Hammar, Fredrik Wikingsson	Lars Beckung, Petra Måhl
Last Laugh, The	2016	Ferne Pearlstein	Robert Edwards, Amy Hobby, Anne Hubbell, Ferne Pearlstein, Jan Warner
Last Lions, The	2011	Dereck Joubert	
Last Mountain, The	2011	Bill Haney	Clara Bingham, Eric Grunebaum, Bill Haney
Last Party, The	1993	Mark Benjamin, Marc Levin	
Last Picture Shows, The	2026	Rustin Thompson	Rustin Thompson
Last Pullman Car, The	1983	Gordon Quinn, Jerry Blumenthal	Gordon Quinn, Jerry Blumenthal
Last Repair Shop, The	2023	Ben Proudfoot, Kris Bowers	Ben Proudfoot, Jeremy Lambert, Josh Rosenberg, Kris Bowers
Last Resort, The	2018	Dennis Scholl, Kareem Tabsch	
Last Round: Chuvalo vs. Ali, The	2003	Joseph Blasioli	Silva Basmajian
Last Take: Rust and the Story of Halyna	2025	Rachel Mason	Rachel Mason, Julee Metz, Kate Barry, Jon Bardin, Will Cohen, Jessica Grimshaw, Nick Shumaker, Jennifer Sears
Last Wright, The: Frank Lloyd Wright and the Park Inn Hotel	2008	Lucille Carra	Garry McGee, Lucille Carra
Latinos Beyond Reel	2013	Miguel Picker, Chyng Sun	Lorena Manriquez, Edwin Pagan, Miguel Picker, Chyng Sun
Law and Order	1969	Frederick Wiseman	Frederick Wiseman
Leading to War	2008	Barry J. Hershey	
Legacy	2000	Tod Lending	Daniel Alpert, Tod Lending
Leaving Fear Behind	2008	Dhondup Wangchen	
Leaving Neverland	2019	Dan Reed	Dan Reed
Legend of Bigfoot, The	1976	Harry Winer	Stephen Houston Smith
Legend of Cool "Disco" Dan, The	2013	Joseph Pattisall	
Lennon or McCartney	2014	Matt Schichter	
Leonard Knight: A Man & His Mountain	2015	Andrew Blake Doyle	Andrew Blake Doyle, Andy Dugan, Whitney Hill, Rick Law, Timothy McClellan, Jeremy Palmer, Candy Trumble, and Scott Trumble
Leonardo da Vinci: The Mind of the Renaissance	2001	Jean-Claude Lubtchansky	Jean-Pierre Gibrat
Lessons of Darkness	1992	Werner Herzog	
Let It Be	1970	Michael Lindsay-Hogg	Neil Aspinall, The Beatles
Let It Be	2004		
Let the Canary Sing	2023	Alison Ellwood	Trevor Birney, Alison Ellwood, Ehmear O'Neill, Andrew Tully
Let the Fire Burn	2013	Jason Osder	Jason Osder, Andrew Herwitz
Let's Get Lost	1988	Bruce Weber	
Leviathan	2012	Lucien Castaing-Taylor, Verena Paravel	Lucien Castaing-Taylor, Verena Paravel
Liam	2018	Isidore Bethel	Isidore Bethel, Anne-Laure Berteau
Liam Gallagher: As It Was	2019	Charlie Lightening, Gavin Fitzgerald	Steven Lappin
Liberating a Continent: John Paul II and the Fall of Communism	2018	David Naglieri	
Licensed to Kill	1997	Arthur Dong	
Liebe ohne Angst (Love Without Fear)	1989	Frank Rinnelt	Produced by DEFA on commission for the German Hygiene Museum. The only East German documentary on AIDS prevention.
Sir David Attenboroughs' Life... Life on Earth, The Living Planet, The Trials of Life, Life in the Freezer, The Private Life of Plants, The Life of Birds, The Life of Mammals, Life in the Undergrowth, Life in Cold Blood †	1979–2008	David Attenborough, Ian Calvert, Richard Matthews, Alastair Fothergill	Alastair Fothergill, Richard Brock, Christopher Parsons, and John Sparks
Life According to Ohad	2014	Eri Daniel Erlich	Eri Daniel Erlich
Life After	2025	Reid Davenport	Colleen Cassingham
Life After Flash	2017	Lisa Downs	Lisa Downs, Ashley Pugh
Life After People	2008	David de Vries	
Life and Deaths of Christopher Lee, The	2024	Jon Spira	Adam F. Goldberg, Hank Starrs
Life and Times of Hank Greenberg, The	1998	Aviva Kempner	
Life at the End of the Rainbow	2002	Wayne Coles-Janess	
Life in the Death of Joe Meek, A	2008	Howard S. Berger, Susan Stahmann	
Life Is But a Dream	2013	Ed Burke, Beyoncé Knowles, Ilan Benatar	Bill Kirstein, Lee Anne Callahan-Longo
Life Itself	2014	Steve James	Zak Piper, Steve James, Garrett Basch
Life Somewhere Else	1995	Walter Salles	Mini Kerti
Life Without Pain, A	2005	Melody Gilbert	Melody Gilbert
Light a Candle, To	2014	Maziar Bahari	
Lightning Over Water	1980	Wim Wenders, Nicholas Ray	Pierre Cottrell, Chris Sievernich, Wim Wenders
Lil Bub & Friendz	2013	Andy Capper, Juliette Eisner	Juliette Eisner
Lil Nas X: Long Live Montero	2023	Carlos López Estrada, Zac Manuel	Adriana Arce, Adam Leber, Saul Levitz, Hodo Musa, Gee Roberson
Lilith Fair: Building a Mystery	2025	Ally Pankiw	Dan Levy, Christina Piovesan
Lima is Burning	2023	Alberto Castro	Alberto Castro, Nevenka Yanovich
Limited Partnership	2014	Thomas G. Miller	Thomas G. Miller, Kirk Marcolina
Lindsay Lohan's Indian Journey	2010	Maninderpal Sahota	Maninderpal Sahota
Linguists, The	2008	Seth Kramer, Daniel A. Miller, Jeremy Newberger	Seth Kramer, Daniel A. Miller, Jeremy Newberger
Listen to Britain	1942	Humphrey Jennings, Stewart McAllister	
Listers: A Glimpse Into Extreme Birdwatching	2025	Owen Reiser	
Little Deputy, The	2015	Trevor Anderson	Trevor Anderson
Little Dieter Needs to Fly	1997	Werner Herzog	Werner Herzog Filmproduktion
Little Man	2005	Nicole Conn	
Little Vicious, A	1991	Immy Humes	Immy Humes
Live and Let Live	2013	Marc Pierschel	Marc Pierschel
Living City, The	1953	Haskell Wexler	John Barnes
Living Desert, The	1953	James Algar	
Living Dolls: The Making of a Child Beauty Queen	2001	Shari Cookson	Shari Cookson, Jean Guest, Linda Otto
Living Goddess	2008	Ishbel Whitaker	
Living in the Age of Airplanes	2015	Brian J. Terwilliger	
Living with Michael Jackson	2003	Julie Shaw	James Goldston, Julie Shaw
Liza: A Truly Terrific Absolutely True Story	2024	Bruce David Klein	Bruce David Klein, Alexander J. Goldstein, Robert Rich
Lo and Behold, Reveries of the Connected World	2016	Werner Herzog	Werner Herzog, Rupert Maconick
Lobsters	1936	John Mathias, László Moholy-Nagy	
Location Africa	1987	Steff Gruber	Steff Gruber
Lockerbie Revisited	2009	Gideon Levy	
London Can Take It!	1940	Harry Watt	
London Scene, The	1961	Bill Morton	Aubrey Buxton
Lonely Battle of Thomas Reid, The	2018	Feargal Ward	Luke McManus
Long Haul, A	2010	Nathaniel Kramer	Nathaniel Kramer
Long Night's Journey into Day	2000	Deborah Hoffmann, Frances Reid	Frances Reid, Johnny Symons
Long Shot	2017	Jacob LaMendola	Jacob LaMendola, Mary Beth Minthorn, Milos S. Silber, Todd Wiseman Jr.
Long Strange Trip	2017	Amir Bar-Lev	Eric Eisner, Alex Blavatnik, Nicholas Koskoff, Justin Kreutzmann, Ken Dornstein
Long Time Running	2017	Jennifer Baichwal, Nicholas de Pencier	Rachel McLean, Scot McFadyen
Look into My Eyes	2024	Lana Wilson	Lana Wilson, Kyle Martin
Looking for Fidel	2004	Oliver Stone	Carla Pagi
Looking for Richard	1996	Al Pacino	Al Pacino and William Teitler
Loose Change	2007	Dylan Avery	Korey Rowe and Matthew Brown
Loot	2008	Darius Marder	Misha Collins, Dan Campbell, Zebidiah Millett
Lord of the Universe	1974	Michael Shamberg	
Lorne	2026	Morgan Neville	Morgan Neville, Lauren Belfer
Los Lonely Boys: Cottonfields and Crossroads	2006	Hector Galán	
Lost Arcade, The	2015	Kurt Vincent	Irene Chin
Lost in La Mancha	2002	Keith Fulton, Louis Pepe	
Lost Sabungeros	2024	Bryan Kristoffer Brazil	Joselito Chang Tan
Lost Soul: The Doomed Journey of Richard Stanley's Island of Dr. Moreau	2014	David Gregory	Carl Daft, David Gregory
Lost Tomb of Jesus, The	2007	Simcha Jacobovici	Felix Golubev, Ric Esther Bienstock
Louder Than a Bomb	2010	Greg Jacobs, Jon Siskel	Greg Jacobs, Jon Siskel
Louis, Martin & Michael	2003	Louis Theroux	Louis Theroux
Louis B. Mayer, King of Hollywood	1999	F. Whitman Trecartin	
Louis Theroux: Behind Bars	2008	Stuart Cabb	Stuart Cabb
Louis Theroux: Miami Mega Jail	2011	Emma Cooper	Emma Cooper
Louisiana Story	1948	Robert J. Flaherty	
Love Crimes of Kabul	2011	Tanaz Eshaghian	Tanaz Eshaghian, Christoph Jorg
Love Is a Verb	2014	Terry Spencer Hesser	Terry Spencer Hesser
Love, Marilyn	2012	Liz Garbus	Stanley F. Buchthal, Liz Garbus, Amy Hobby
Love The Beast	2009	Eric Bana	
Love to Love You, Donna Summer	2023	Roger Ross Williams, Brooklyn Sudano	Roger Ross Williams, Julie Goldman, Christopher Clements, Carolyn Hepburn, David Blackman
Love We Make, The	2011	Albert Maysles, Bradley Kaplan	Laura Coxson, Susan Froemke, Bradley Kaplan, Ian Markiewicz, Katie Shoran
Love Yourself in Seoul	2019		
Love+War	2025	Elizabeth Chai Vasarhelyi, Jimmy Chin	Elizabeth Chai Vasarhelyi, Jimmy Chin, Shannon Dill, Anna Barnes
Lovecraft: Fear of the Unknown	2008	Frank H. Woodward	William Janczewski, James B. Myers, Frank H. Woodward
Loyalty & Betrayal: The Story of the American Mob	1994	Bill Jersey, Gary Weimberg	Janet Mercer, Bill Jersey
Lullaby to My Father	2012	Amos Gitai	Amos Gitai, Laurent Truchot, Alex Iordachescu
LuLu Sessions, The	2011	S. Casper Wong	
Lynch/Oz	2022	Alexandre O. Philippe	Kerry Deignan Roy

== M ==
† = Series

Title	Year	Director(s)	Producer(s)
Mad Hot Ballroom	2005	Marilyn Agrelo	Marilyn Agrelo and Amy Sewell
Made in England: The Films of Powell and Pressburger	2024	David Hinton	Nick Varley, Matthew Wells
Madoff: The Monster of Wall Street †	2023	Joe Berlinger	Jon Doran, Samantha Grogin, Jen Isaacson, Jon Kamen, Eve Rodrick
Madonna: Truth or Dare	1991	Alek Keshishian	Tim Clawson, Jay Roewe
Maestro	2003	Josell Ramos	
Magic Trip	2011	Alex Gibney, Alison Ellwood	Alex Gibney, Gareth Wiley
Magical Death	1973	Napoleon Chagnon, Tim Asch	
Making Marie Antoinette	2026	Eleanor Coppola	Lorenzo Mieli, Mario Gianani, Rachel Dengiz, Youree Henley, Sofia Coppola
Making North America	2015	Peter Oxley, Gwyn Williams	Peter Oxley
Making of a Legend: Gone with the Wind, The	1988	David Hinton	L. Jeffrey Selznick
The Making of a Martyr	2006	Brooke Goldstein, Alistair Leyland	
The Making of a New Empire	1999	Jos de Putter	
Making of Fanny and Alexander, The	1984	Ingmar Bergman	
Making Waves: The Art of Cinematic Sound	2019	Midge Costin	Bobette Buster, Karen Johnson, Midge Costin
Mala Mala	2014	Antonio Santini, Dan Sickles	Antonio Santini and Dan Sickles
Malcolm X: Make It Plain	1994	Orlando Bagwell	Orlando Bagwell
The Maltese Double Cross – Lockerbie	1998	Allan Francovich	
Man Among Giants, A	2009	Rod Webber	Ali Bell, Matthew D. Ferrel
Man Called Brian, A	2005	Mahmoud Shoolizadeh	Neda Armian
Man from Fifth Avenue, The	1986	Tengiz Semyonov	
Man from Mo'Wax, The	2016	Matthew Jones	Brian A. Hoffman, Matthew Jones, and M.J. McMahon
Man from Plains	2007	Jonathan Demme	
Man in Motion: The Rick Hansen Story	2026	Adrian Buitenhuis	Derik Murray, Ryan Reynolds
Man in the Silk Hat, The	1983	Maud Linder	Maud Linder
Man of Aran	1934	Robert J. Flaherty	
Man on the Run	2025	Morgan Neville	Morgan Neville and others
Man on Wire	2008	James Marsh	Simon Chinn
Man Who Saw Tomorrow, The	1981	Robert Guenette	Paul Drane, Robert Guenette, Lee Kramer
Man Who Saw Too Much, The	2015	Trisha Ziff	Trisha Ziff, Alan Suárez
Man Who Skied Down Everest, The	1975	Bruce Nyznik, Lawrence Schiller	
Man with 80 Wives, The	2006	Lucy Leveugle	Lucy Leveugle
Man with a Movie Camera	1929	Dziga Vertov	
Man vs Snake: The Long and Twisted Tale of Nibbler	2015	Andrew Seklir, Tim Kinzy	
Manda Bala (Send a Bullet)	2007	Jason Kohn	Joey Frank, Jason Kohn, Jared Ian Goldman
Mandela	1996	Angus Gibson, Jo Menell	Jonathan Demme, Jo Menell, Edward Saxon
Manhunt: The Search for Bin Laden	2013	Greg Barker	John Battsek, Julie Goldman, Greg Barker
Manifestations of Shiva	1980	Malcolm Leigh	
Manson	1973	Robert Hendrickson	
Manufactured Landscapes	2006	Jennifer Baichwal	Nicholas de Pencier, Daniel Iron, Jennifer Baichwal
Manufacturing Consent: Noam Chomsky and the Media	1992	Mark Achbar, Peter Wintonick	
Mapplethorpe: Look at the Pictures	2016	Randy Barbato, Fenton Bailey	Katharina Otto-Bernstein
Marc by Sofia	2025	Sofia Coppola	Jane Cha Cutler, Sofia Coppola, R. J. Cutler, Elise Pearlstein, Trevor Smith
Marcel Lefebvre – Archbishop in Stormy Times	2012	Jacques-Régis du Cray	
March of the Dinosaurs	2011	Matthew Thompson	Mike Davis
March of the Penguins	2005	Luc Jacquet	Yves Darondeau, Christophe Lioud, and Emmanuel Priou
Marina Abramović: The Artist Is Present	2012	Matthew Akers, Jeff Dupre	Maro Chermayeff, Jeff Dupre
Mario Lanza: The American Caruso	1983	John Musilli	JoAnn Young
Marjoe	1972	Howard Smith, Sarah Kernochan	
The Mark of Cain	2000	Alix Lambert	
Mark of the Maker, The	1991	David McGowan	
Marion's Triumph	2003	John Chua	
Mark Twain	2001	Ken Burns	Ken Burns and Dayton Duncan
Marlee Matlin: Not Alone Anymore	2025	Shoshannah Stern	Shoshannah Stern, Bonni Cohen, Robyn Kopp, Justine Nagan
Marlene	1984	Maximilian Schell	
Marley	2012	Kevin Macdonald	Charles Steele
Married in America	2002	Michael Apted	
Married in Canada	2010	Arianne Robinson	Arianne Robinson
Marshall University: Ashes to Glory	2000	Deborah Novak	John Witek
Martha	2024	R. J. Cutler	Jane Cha Cutler, Alina Cho, R. J. Cutler, Trevor Smith, Austin Wilkin
Marty, Life Is Short	2026	Lawrence Kasdan	Sara Bernstein, Blair Foster, Lawrence Kasdan, Meredith Kaulfers, Christopher St. John, Justin Wilkes
Marvel's Behind the Mask	2021	Michael Jacobs	Joe Quesada, Sarah Amos, Shane Rahmani, Stephen Wacker, John Cerilli, Harry Go
Marx Reloaded	2011	Jason Barker	Medea Film
Matrix Revisited, The	2001	Josh Oreck	Eric Matthies
Mathematically Alive: A Story of Fandom	2007	Katherine Foronjy, Joseph Coburn	
Matter of Taste, A: Serving Up Paul Liebrandt	2011	Sally Rowe	Sally Rowe, Alan Oxman, Rachel Mills
Maxime, McDuff & McDo	2002	Magnus Isacsson	Monique Simard, Marcel Simard
Maya Lin: A Strong Clear Vision	1994	Freida Lee Mock	Terry Sanders
Mayor	2020	David Osit	David Osit
Mayor Pete	2021	Jesse Moss	Dan Cogan, Amanda McBaine, Jon Bardin, Laurie David, Jesse Moss
McCartney: The Hunt for the Lost Bass	2026	Arthur Cary	Katherine Anstey
McCullin	2012	David Morris and Jacqui Morris	
McLaren	2017	Roger Donaldson	Fraser Brown, Matthew Metcalfe
McLibel: Two People Who Wouldn't Say Sorry	1997	Franny Armstrong, Ken Loach	Franny Armstrong
Me and the Mosque	2005	Zarqa Nawaz	Joseph MacDonald
Me at the Zoo	2012	Chris Moukarbel, Valerie Veatch	Chris Moukarbel, Valerie Veatch
Mea Maxima Culpa: Silence in the House of God	2012	Alex Gibney	Alex Gibney, Alexandra Johnes, Kristen Vaurio, Jedd Wider, Todd Wider
Meat the Future	2020	Liz Marshall	Liz Marshall
Meena	2014	Lucy Liu, Colin K. Gray, Megan Raney	Mikaela Beardsley, Kevin Chinoy, Kerry Girvin, Jamie Gordon
Meeting Gorbachev	2018	Werner Herzog	
Meeting Resistance	2007	Molly Bingham and Steve Connors	Daniel J.Chalfen
Meet the Mormons	2014	Blair Treu	Jeff Roberts
Meet the Patels	2015	Geeta V. Patel and Ravi V. Patel	Janet Eckholm and Geralyn Dreyfous
Meet Your Meat	2002	Bruce Friedrich, Cem Akin	
Megadoc	2025	Mike Figgis	James T. Mockoski, Tara Li-An Smith
Mel Brooks: The 99 Year Old Man!	2026	Judd Apatow, Michael Bonfiglio	Wayne Federman, Olivia Rosenbloom
Melgar es Arequipa, Campeones del 81	2023	Wildo Ontiveros Aparicio	Pilar Rivera
Memory of Justice, The	1976	Marcel Ophüls	
The Memory of Butterflies	2025	Tatiana Fuentes Sadowski	Lali Maduero Medina, Tatiana, Fuentes Sadowski, Ico Costa
Memory: The Origins of Alien	2019	Alexandre O. Philippe	Kerry Deignan Roy
The Memphis Belle: A Story of a Flying Fortress	1944	William Wyler	William Wyler
Men of War	2024	Jen Gatien, Billy Corben	Alfred Spellman, Jen Gatien, Billy Corben
Menendez Brothers, The	2024	Alejandro Hartmann	Ross M. Dinerstein, Rebecca Evens
Menus-Plaisirs – Les Troisgros	2023	Frederick Wiseman	Olivier Giel, Karen Konicek, Frederick Wiseman
Meru	2007	Jimmy Chin and Elizabeth Chai Vasarhelyi	Shannon Ethridge, Chin, and Vasarhelyi
Messenger, The	2015	Su Rynard	Joanne Jackson, Sally Black, Diane Woods, and Martin de la Fouchardiere
Metal: A Headbanger's Journey	2005	Sam Dunn, Scot McFadyen, and Jessica Joy Wise	Sam Dunn, Scot McFadyen, and Sam Feldman
Metal Evolution †	2011	Sam Dunn and Scot McFadyen	Banger Films
Metal of Honor: The Ironworkers of 9/11	2006		
Method to the Madness of Jerry Lewis	2011	Gregg Barson	Gregg Barson
Mia and Roman	1968	Hatami	Hatami
Michael Jackson: Chase the Truth	2019	Jordan Hill	Brian Aabech
Michael Jackson: The Last Photo Shoots	2014	Anila Mariya Jose	Craig J. Williams, Edward Bass, Raymond J. Markovich
Michael Jackson: The Life of an Icon	2011	Andrew Eastel	David Gest, Denise Berry
Michael Jackson Interview, The: The Footage You Were Never Meant To See	2003		Marc Schaffel
Michael Jackson's Boys	2005	Helen Littleboy	Sam Dwyer
Michael Jackson's Journey from Motown to Off the Wall	2016	Spike Lee	
Michael Jackson's Private Home Movies	2003	Brad Lachman	Marc Schaffel
Michael Jackson's This Is It	2009	Kenny Ortega	
Michael Jordan to the Max	2000	Don Kempf, James D. Stern	Don Kempf, Steve Kempf, Estee Portnoy, James D. Stern
Michael Moore Hates America	2004	Michael Wilson	
Michael Moore in TrumpLand	2016	Michael Moore	Michael Moore
Microcosmos	1996	Claude Nuridsany, Marie Pérennou	Christophe Barratier, Yvette Mallet, Jacques Perrin
Microprocessor Chronicles	2006	Rob Walker	
Middle Sexes: Redefining He and She	2005	Antony Thomas	Carleen L. Hsu, Antony Thomas
Midnight Movies: From the Margin to the Mainstream	2005	Stuart Samuels	
Mighty Times: The Children's March	2004	Robert Houston, Robert Hudson	Robert Hudson
Millhouse: A White Comedy	1971	Emile de Antonio	
Milli Vanilli	2023	Luke Korem	Bradley Jackson
Million Calorie March: The Movie	2008	Gary Marino	
Million Dollar Duck, The	2016	Brian Davis	
Mimy & Tony: The Creation of a Dream	2024	Tony Succar, Santiago Díaz	Tony Succar
Mind Meld: Secrets Behind the Voyage of a Lifetime	2001	Peter Jaysen	
Mind of Mark DeFriest, The	2014	Gabriel London	Daniel J. Chalfen, Gabriel London, Charlie Sadoff
Mine	2009	Geralyn Pezanoski	
Minecraft: The Story of Mojang	2012	Paul Owens	Paul Levering
Mineshaft: The Cruising Murders	2026	Jeffrey Schwarz	John Boccardo, Jeffrey Schwarz
Mirage Men	2013	John Lundberg, Roland Denning, Kypros Kyprianou	Roland Dennnig, Kypros Kyprianou, John Lundberg, Mark Pilkington
Mirlo's Dance	2022	Álvaro Luque	Melissa Cordero, Nicolás Carrasco, Renzo Maldonado, Ricardo Maldonado
Misa's Fugue	2012	Sean Gaston	Sean Gaston, Jennifer Goss
Misery Loves Comedy	2015	Kevin Pollak	Barry Katz, Becky Newhall, Burton Ritchie
Miss 501: A Portrait of Luck	2002	Jules Karatechamp	Jules Karatechamp
Miss America	2002	Lisa Ades	Lisa Ades, Lesli Klainberg
Miss Representation	2011	Jennifer Siebel Newsom	Jennifer Siebel Newsom, Julie Costanzo
Mission Kipi	2024	Sonally Tuesta	Sonally Tuesta, Javier Anaya, Martina Sottile
Mitt	2014	Greg Whiteley	Adam Leibowitz, Greg Whiteley
MLK/FBI	2020	Sam Pollard	Benjamin Hedin
Moana	1926	Robert J. Flaherty	
Moby Doc	2021	Rob Gordon Bralver	Rob Gordon Bralver, Jeff Broadway
Modern Masters: S. S. Rajamouli	2024	Raghav Khanna, Tanvi Ajinkya	Sameer Nair, Deepak Segal, Anupama Chopra
Modulations: Cinema for the Ear	1998	Iara Lee	George Gund III
Mojados: Through the Night	2004	Tommy Davis	Tommy Davis
The Moelln Letters	2025	Martina Priessner	Friedemann Hottenbacher, Gregor Streiber
Molotov Alva and His Search for the Creator	2007	Douglas Gayeton	
Monastery, The: Mr. Vig and the Nun	2006	Pernille Rose Grønkjær	Sigrid Dyekjær
Mondo Cane	1962	Gualtiero Jacopetti, Paolo Cavara, Franco Prosperi	Gualtiero Jacopetti, Angelo Rizzoli
Mondo Hollywood	1967	Robert Carl Cohen	Robert Carl Cohen
Mondo New York	1988	Harvey Nikolai Keith	Stuart S. Shapiro
Mondovino	2004	Jonathan Nossiter	Jonathan Nossiter, Emmanuel Giraud
Monk with a Camera: The Life and Journey of Nicholas Vreeland	2014	Guido Santi, Tina Mascara	Guido Santi, Tina Mascara, Vishwanath Alluri
Monsoon Oracle, The	2013	Shrenik Rao	
Monster Camp	2007	Cullen Hoback	
Montauk Chronicles	2014	Christopher Garetano	Christopher Garetano
Monument to the Dream	1967	Charles Guggenheim, L. T. Iglehart	Charles Guggenheim, Shelby Storck
Monumental: In Search of America's National Treasure	2012	Duane Barnhart	John Bona, Bill Hough, Mark Gambee
Moo Man, The	2013	Andy Heathcote	Heike Bachelier, Andy Heathcote
Moon for Sale	2007	Nick Davidson	Nick Davidson
Moonage Daydream	2022	Brett Morgen	Brett Morgen
More than Honey	2012	Markus Imhoof	Helmut Grasser, Markus Imhoof, Thomas Kufus, Pierre-Alain Meier
Morning Sun	2003	Carma Hinton, Geremie Barmé, and Richard Gordon	
The Most Hated Family in America	2007	Geoffrey O'Connor	Geoffrey O'Connor
Most Valuable Players	2010	Matthew D. Kallis	Matthew D. Kallis, Christopher Lockhart
Mostly Sunny	2016	Dilip Mehta	Craig Thompson
Mosul	2019	Dan Gabriel	Matt Schrader
Mosuo Sisters, The	2012	Marlo Poras	
Mother Apart, A	2024	Laurie Townshend	Alison Duke, Ngardy Conteh George, Justine Pimlott
Motherland	2010	Owen 'Alik Shahadah	Betelihem Zelealem
Motivation, The	2013	Adam Bhala Lough	Adam Bhala Lough, Ethan Higbee
Mountain	2017	Jennifer Peedom	Jo-Anne McGowan, Jennifer Peedom
The Mountain Meadows Massacre	2001	Demetrius Graham	Dave Chase, Jan Walker, Larinda Wenzel
Mountaintop Removal	2007	Michael O'Connell	Michael O'Connell
Mouth of the Wolf, The	2009	Pietro Marcello	Francesca Cima, Nicola Giuliano, Dario Zonta
Move Ya Body: The Birth of House	2025	Elegance Bratton	Chester Algernal Gordon
Movie Man, The	2024	Matt Finlin	Karen Barzilay
MoviePass, MovieCrash	2024	Muta'Ali	Mark Wahlberg, Stephen Levinson, Archie Gips, Jack Heller, Scott Veltri, Jevon Frank, David Wendall
Moving Midway	2007	Godfrey Cheshire	Godfrey Cheshire, Vincent Farrell, Jay Spain
Mr. Big	2007	Tiffany Burns	Tiffany Burns
Mr. Death: The Rise and Fall of Fred A. Leuchter, Jr.	1999	Errol Morris	
Mr. Dressup: The Magic of Make-Believe	2023	Robert McCallum	Mark Bishop, Aeschylus Poulos
Mr. Nobody Against Putin	2025	David Borenstein, Pavel Talankin	Helle Faber, Radovan Síbrt, Alžběta Karásková, Petra Dobešová
Mr. Schneider Goes to Washington	2007	Jonathan Neil Schneider	Jonathan Neil Schneider, Herb Abbott
Mr. Untouchable	2007	Marc Levin	Mary-Jane Robinson, Alex Gibney, Jason Kliot, Joana Vincente
Müezzin	2009	Sebastian Brameshuber	Sebastian Brameshuber, Gabriele Kranzelbinder
Mugabe and the White African	2009	Lucy Bailey, Andrew Thompson	David Pearson, Elizabeth Morgan Hemlock
Muhammad: Legacy of a Prophet	2002	Michael Schwarz, Omar al-Qattan	Michael Schwarz, Alex Kronemer, Michael Wolfe
Munich '72 and Beyond	2016	Stephen Crisman	Steven Ungerleider, David C. Ulich
Munich: Mossad's Revenge	2006	Tom Whitter, Tom Pollock	Anthony Geffen
Murder City: Detroit - 100 Years of Crime and Violence	2008	Alan Bradley	Ben Scott
Murder of Fred Hampton, The	1971	Howard Alk	
Murder on a Sunday Morning	2001	Jean-Xavier de Lestrade	
Murderball	2005	Henry Alex Rubin and Dana Adam Shapiro	Jeff Mandel
Music by John Williams	2024	Laurent Bouzereau	Sara Bernstein, Laurent Bouzereau, Justin Falvey, Darryl Frank, Brian Grazer, Ron Howard, Meredith Kaulfers, Kathleen Kennedy, Frank Marshall, Steven Spielberg, Justin Wilkes
Music for the Movies: Bernard Herrmann	1992	Joshua Waletzky	
Musk	2026	Alex Gibney	Jessie Deeter, Alex Gibney, Dana O'Keefe
Muslim Jesus, The	2007	Irshad Ashraf	Irshad Ashraf
Muslims Are Coming!, The	2013	Negin Farsad, Dean Obeidallah	Negin Farsad, Dean Obeidallah
Mutant	2025	Constanza Tejo	Valentina Roblero
My Architect	2003	Nathaniel Kahn	Nathaniel Kahn, Susan Rose Behr
My Armenian Phantoms	2025	Tamara Stepanyan	Alice Baldo, Céline Loiseau, Tamara Stepanyan
My Best Fiend	1999	Werner Herzog	Lucki Stipetic
My Brother the Islamist	2011	Robb Leech	Robb Leech
My Brother the Serial Killer	2012	David Monaghan	David Monaghan, John Terp
My Date with Drew	2004	Jon Gunn, Brian Herzlinger, Brett Winn	Kerry David, Jon Gunn, Brian Herzlinger, Brett Winn
My Dead Dad's Porno Tapes	2018	Charlie Tyrell	Julie Baldassi
My Eye for a Camera	2001	Denys Desjardins	Nicole Lamothe
My Father, the BTK Killer	2025	Skye Borgman	Ross M. Dinerstein, Rebecca Evans
My Father the Genius	2002	Lucia Small	
My Flesh and Blood	2003	Jonathan Karsh	
My Generation	2000	Barbara Kopple	
My Kid Could Paint That	2007	Amir Bar-Lev	
My Life Directed by Nicolas Winding Refn	2014	Liv Corfixen	Lene Børglum
My Love, Don't Cross That River	2013	Jin Mo-young	Han Gyeong-su
My Mom Jayne	2025	Mariska Hargitay	Mariska Hargitay, Trish Adlesic
My Name Is Alfred Hitchcock	2022	Mark Cousins	John Archer
My Name Is Han	1948	William James	
My Reincarnation	2011	Jennifer Fox	Jennifer Fox
My Scientology Movie	2015	John Dower	Simon Chinn
My Survival as an Aboriginal	1979	Essie Coffey	Essie Coffey, Alec Morgan, Martha Ansara
My Truth: The Rape of 2 Coreys	2020	Brian Herzlinger	Arthur Jameson
Mystères sanglants de l'OTS, Les	2006	Yves Boisset	Serge Moati, Christilla Huillard-Kann, Yves Fortin, André Mailly
Mysterion	1991	Pirjo Honkasalo, Eira Mollberg	
Mysterious Castles of Clay	1978	Alan Root, Joan Root	
Mysterious Monsters, The	1976	Robert Guenette	Robert Guenette, Charles Sellier
Mysterious Origins of Man, The	1996	Bill Cote	John Cheshire, Bill Cote, Carol Cote
Mystery of Matter, The	2014	Stephen Lyons, Muffie Meyer	Stephen Lyons
Mystery of the Sphinx, The	1993	Bill Cote	Robert Watts
Mystify: Michael Hutchence	2019	Richard Lowenstein	Maya Gnyp, John Battsek, Sue Murray, Mark Fennessy, Richard Lowenstein, Lynn-Maree Milburn, Andrew de Groot
Mythic Journeys	2009	Stephen Boe, Whitney Boe	

== N ==
† = Series

Title	Year	Director(s)	Producer(s)
N-Word, The	2004	Todd Larkins Williams	Helena Echegoyen, Nelson George
Nalini by Day, Nancy by Night	2005	Sonali Gulati	Sonali Gulati
Nanking	2007	Bill Guttentag and Dan Sturman	Bill Guttentag, Michael Jacobsand, and Ted Leonsis
Nanook of the North: A Story Of Life and Love In the Actual Arctic	1922	Robert J. Flaherty	Robert J. Flaherty
Naked Bunyip, The	1970	John B. Murray	John B. Murray, Phillip Adams
Naked Fame	2005	Christopher Long	Christopher Long
Naked Feminist, The	2004	Louisa Achille	Louisa Achille
Naked Sea	1954	Allen H. Miner	Allen H. Miner
Narco Cultura	2013	Shaul Schwarz	
Natchez	2025	Suzannah Herbert	Suzannah Herbert, Darcy McKinnon
National Bird	2016	Sonia Kennebeck	Ines Hofmann Kanna, Sonia Kennebeck, Wim Wenders, Errol Morris
National Lampoon: Drunk Stoned Brilliant Dead	2015	Douglas Tirola	Susan Bedusa and Douglas Tirola
Native New Yorker	2005	Steve Bilich	Steve Bilich, William Susman
Naushad Ali	1975	Vishwanath Ayengar	Doordarshan Bombay Television Center
NAZA	2026	Yuval Abraham, Rachel Szor	Harry Davies, Lindsay Poulton, James Wilson
NCR: Not Criminally Responsible	2013	John Kastner	John Kastner, Silva Basmajian
Necessary Evil: Super-Villains of DC Comics	2013	Scott Devine, J.M. Kenny	Scott Devine, J.M. Kenny
Nefarious: Merchant of Souls	2011	Benjamin Nolot	Benjamin Nolot
Negroes with Guns: Rob Williams and Black Power	2004	Sandra Dickson, Churchill Roberts	
Neil Young: Heart of Gold	2006	Jonathan Demme	Ilona Herzberg
Neil Young Trunk Show	2009	Jonathan Demme	
Nema Aviona Za Zagreb	2012	Louis van Gasteren	Louis van Gasteren, Joke Meerman, and Ilja Lammers
Nerds 2.0.1: A Brief History of the Internet	2012	Stephen Segaller	
Nerdcore Rising	2008	Negin Farsad	Negin Farsad, Kimmy Gatewood, and Andrew Mendelson
Netz über Bord – Heringsfang auf der Nordsee	1955	Jürgen Roland	
Never Look Away	2024	Lucy Lawless	Tom Blackwell, Lucy Lawless, Matthew Metcalfe
Never Sleep Again: The Elm Street Legacy	2010	Daniel Farrands, Andrew Kasch	Daniel Farrands, Thommy Hutson
Neverland Firsthand: Investigating the Michael Jackson Documentary	2019	Eli Pedraza	Liam McEwan
New Muslim Cool	2009	Jennifer Maytorena Taylor	Jennifer Maytorena Taylor
New Radical, The	2017	Adam Bhala Lough, Andrew Neel	Lucy Sumner, Greg Stewart, Brent Stiefel, Alex Needles
New World Order	2009	Luke Meyer, Andrew Neel	Tom Davis
New York Doll	2005	Greg Whiteley	Ed Cunningham, Seth Gordon
New Yorker at 100, The	2025	Marshall Curry	Marshall Curry, Elizabeth Martin, Xan Parker
Newburgh Sting, The	2014	Kate Davis, David Heilbroner	Kate Davis, David Heilbroner
News Items	1983	Raymond Depardon	
Next Goal Wins	2014	Mike Brett, Steve Jamison	Kristian Brodie
Next: A Primer on Urban Painting	2005	Pablo Aravena	Pablo Aravena
Nicaragua Was Our Home	1986	Lee Shapiro	Lee Shapiro
Night and Fog	1955	Alain Resnais	
Night at the Garden, A	2017	Marshall Curry	Marshall Curry
Night Has Come	2024	Paolo Tizón	Diana Castro, Paolo Tizón
Night Mail	1936	Harry Watt	Harry Watt and Basil Wright
Nightmare, The	2015	Rodney Ascher	Ross M. Dinerstein, Glen Zipper
Nightmares in Red, White and Blue	2009	Andrew Monument	Joseph Maddrey
Nine Hundred Nights	2001	Michael Burlingame	Toby Byron
Nine Lives of Marion Barry, The	2009	Dana Flor, Toby Oppenheimer	Julie Goldman
Nintendo Quest: The Most Unofficial and Unauthorized Nintendo Documentary Ever!	2015	Rob McCallum	Michael C. Froussios, Jordan Christopher Morris
Nitrate Kisses	1992	Barbara Hammer	Barbara Hammer
Nixon's China Game	2000		
No Bigger than a Minute	2006	Steven Delano	Steven Delano, Diane Markrow
No Burqas Behind Bars	2012	Maryam Ebrahimi, Nima Sarvestani	
No Direction Home: Bob Dylan	2005	Martin Scorsese	Spitfire Pictures, Grey Water Park Productions, Thirteen/WNET, and New York and Sikelia Productions
No Distance Left to Run	2010	Dylan Southern, Will Lovelace	Lucas Ochoa
No End in Sight	2007	Charles Ferguson	Jennie Amias, Charles Ferguson, Audrey Marrs, and Jessie Vogelson
No Greater Law	2018	Tom Dumican	Jesse Lichtenstein
No Impact Man	2009	Laura Gabbert, Justin Schein	
No No: A Dockumentary	2014	Jeff Radice	Jeff Radice, Chris Cortez, Jeffrey Brown, Mike Blizzard
No Other Land	2024	Basel Adra, Hamdan Ballal, Yuval Abraham, Rachel Szor	Fabien Greenberg, Bård Kjøge Rønning
No Place Like Home	2006	Courtney Fathom Sell	Courtney Fathom Sell
No Safe Spaces	2019	Justin Folk	Owen Brennan, Justin Folk, Mark Joseph, Robert J. Moeller, Bob Perkins
No Sleep Til Kyiv	2025	Eric Liebman	
No Visible Trauma	2020	Marc Serpa Francoeur, Robinder Uppal	Geoff Morrison, Marc Serpa Francoeur, Robinder Uppal
Nobody Speak: Trials of the Free Press	2017	Brian Knappenberger	Brian Knappenberger, Femke Wolting, Korelan Matteson
Noon of the 10th Day, The	1988	Mahmoud Shoolizadeh	Javad Peyhani
Nord-sud.com	2007	François Ducat	Les Productions du Lagon, Iota Productions, RTBF, France 3, WIP
North Sea	1938	Harry Watt	Alberto Cavalcanti, John Grier
Not a Love Story: A Film About Pornography	1981	Bonnie Sherr Klein	Dorothy Todd Hénaut
Not Going Quietly	2021	Nicholas Bruckman	Amanda Roddy
Not Just a Goof	2024	Eric Kimelton, Christopher Ninness	Eric Kimelton, Christopher Ninness, Scott Seibold
Not My Life	2011	Robert Bilheimer, Richard Young	
Not Quite Hollywood: The Wild, Untold Story of Ozploitation!	2008	Mark Hartley	Michael Lynch, Craig Griffin
Note by Note: The Making of Steinway L1037	2007	Ben Niles	Ben Niles
Notes For a Film	2022	Ignacio Agüero	Amalric de Poncharra, Viviana Erpel, Elisa Sepulveda Ruddoff, Tehani Staiger
Notes Towards an African Orestes	1970	Pier Paolo Pasolini	Gian Vittorio Baldi
Notorious Mr. Bout, The	2014	Tony Gerber, Maxim Pozdorovkin	
Nuba Conversations	2000	Arthur Howes	Arthur Howes
Nuisance Bear	2021	Jack Weisman, Gabriela Osio Vanden	Melissa Fajardo, Will N. Miller, Jack Weisman
Nuisance Bear	2026	Jack Weisman, Gabriela Osio Vanden	Michael Code, Will N. Miller, Teddy Leifer
Number Our Days	1976	Lynne Littman	Lynne Littman
Nuremberg: The Nazis Facing their Crimes	2006	Christian Delage	
N.Y.H.C.	1999	Frank Pavich	Frank Pavich and Stephen Scarlata

== O ==
† = Series

Title	Year	Director(s)	Producer(s)
O.J.: Made in America	2016	Ezra Edelman	
Oasis	2024	Felipe Morgado and Tamara Uribe	Alba Gaviraghi, Diego Pino Anguita
Oasis: Don't Look Back in Anger	2026	Will Lovelace, Dylan Southern	Sam Bridger, Guy Heeley, Steven Knight, Tom Mackay
Oasis: Supersonic	2016	Mat Whitecross	Simon Halfon, James Gay-Rees, Fiona Neilson
Obsession: Radical Islam's War Against the West	2005	Wayne Kopping	Peter Mier, Raphael Shore
Occupation: Dreamland	2005	Ian Olds and Garrett Scott	Selina Lewis Davidson, Nancy Roth, and Garrett Scott
Ocean of Tears	2012	Billal A Jan	Rajiv Mehrotra
Ocean with David Attenborough	2025	Toby Nowlan, Colin Butfield, Keith Scholey	Toby Nowlan, Keith Scholey
Oceans	2008	Jacques Perrin, Jacques Cluzaud	Jacques Perrin, Nicolas Mauvernay
The Odds Against	1966	Lee R. Bobker	Lee R. Bobker, Helen Kristt Radin
Of Shark and Man	2017	David Diley	David Diley
Of Time and the City	2008	Terence Davies	Solon Papadopoulos, Roy Boulter
Off the Menu: Asian America	2015	Grace Lee	Eurie Chung
Off the Menu: The Last Days of Chasen's	1997	Shari Springer Berman, Robert Pulcini	Julia Strohm, Rob Grader
Oh, Saigon	2007	Doan Hoang	Doan Hoang
Oh, What a Lovely Tea Party	2004	Malcolm Ingram, Jennifer Schwalbach	Kevin Smith
Oh My God	2009	Peter Rodger	Peter Rodger
Oh Yeah!	2025	Nick Canfield	Nick Canfield
Okie Noodling	2001	Bradley Beesley	
Oklahoma City Bombing: American Terror	2025	Greg Tillman	Tiller Russell, Brian Lovett, Jeff Hasler
Old Partner	2008	Lee Chung-ryoul	Goh Young-jae
Oldest Person in the World, The	2026	Sam Green	Alison Byrne Fields, Josh Penn
Oliver Stone's Untold History of the United States †	2012	Oliver Stone	Oliver Stone, Tara Tremaine, and Rob Wilson
Olives and Their Oil	1914		
Olympia	1938	Leni Riefenstahl	Leni Riefenstahl
Olympia	2018	Harry Mavromichalis	Harry Mavromichalis, Muriel Moraes, Keren Seol, Andrew Ford
On a Day of Ordinary Violence, My Friend Michel Seurat...	1996	Omar Amiralay	
On a Tightrope	2007	Petr Lom	Torstein Grude
On Any Sunday	1971	Bruce Brown	Bruce Brown, Steve McQueen
On Any Sunday: Motocross, Malcolm, & More	2001	Dana Brown	Dana Brown
On Native Soil	2006	Linda Ellman	
On the Road to Timbuktu: Explorers in Africa	1999	Jean-Claude Lubtchansky	Jean-Pierre Gibrat
On the Trail with Miss Snail Pail	2009	Greg Young	
On Two Fronts: Latinos & Vietnam	2015	Mylène Moreno	Mylène Moreno
Once Upon a Time in the East	2011	Demir Yanev	Demir Yanev
Once Upon a Time in Harlem	2026	William Greaves, David Greaves	Liani Greaves, Anne de Mare
Once Upon a Time in Mesopotamia	1998	Jean-Claude Lubtchansky	Jean-Pierre Gibrat
Once Upon a Wheel	1971	David Winters	David Winters, Burt Rosen
Once Were Brothers: Robbie Robertson and the Band	2019	Daniel Roher	Lana Belle Mauro, Stephen Paniccia, Andrew Munger, Sam Sutherland
ONE: The Movie	2005	Ward Powers	Diane Powers and Ward Powers
One Big Hapa Family	2010	Jeff Chiba Stearns	Jeff Chiba Stearns
One Bright Shining Moment: The Forgotten Summer of George McGovern	2005	Stephen Vittoria	Stephen Vittoria
One by One	1975	Claude Du Boc	Craig Glazer, Ron Hamady
One Day at Disney	2019	Fritz Mitchell	Victoria Chamlee
One Day in September	1999	Kevin Macdonald	John Battsek, Arthur Cohn
One Day in the Haram	2017	Abrar Hussain	Abdululeh Al Ahmary
One Day in the Life of Andrei Arsenevich	1999	Chris Marker	Thierry Garrel
One Little Pill	2014	Adam Schomer	Adam Schomer, Claudia Christian
One Minute to Nine	2007	Tommy Davis	Jaime Davila
One More Time with Feeling	2016	Andrew Dominik	Dulcie Kellett, James Wilson
One Nation Under God	2009	Will Bakke	Michael B Allen
One of Us	2017	Heidi Ewing, Rachel Grady	Heidi Ewing, Rachel Grady
One Percent, The	2006	Jamie Johnson	Jamie Johnson and Nick Kurzon
One P.M.	1972	D.A. Pennebaker	Richard Leacock, D.A. Pennebaker
One to One: John & Yoko	2024	Kevin Macdonald, Sam Rice-Edwards	Peter Worsley, Kevin Macdonald, Alice Webb
One Six Right: The Romance of Flying	2005	Brian J. Terwilliger	Brian J. Terwilliger
One Small Step: The Story of the Space Chimps	2003	David Cassidy and Kristin Davy	David Cassidy and Kristin Davy
Open Secret, An	2014	Amy J. Berg	Gabe Hoffman, Matthew Valentinas
Operation Homecoming: Writing the Wartime Experience	2007	Richard Robbins	Richard Robbins
Operation Varsity Blues: The College Admissions Scandal	2021	Chris Smith	Chris Smith, Jon Karman, Youree Henley
Operation Wedding: My parents & the plane "hijacking"	2016	Anat Zalmanson-Kuznetsov	Israel Broadcasting Authority Latvia National Film Center Sasha Klein Productions (Israel), Ego Media (Latvia)
Orangutan	2026	Mark Linfield, Vanessa Berlowitz	Mark Linfield, Vanessa Berlowitz, Roy Conli, Nitin Sawhney
Orchids, My Intersex Adventure	2010	Phoebe Hart	Phoebe Hart
Original Kings of Comedy, The	2000	Spike Lee	David Gale, Walter Latham, and Spike Lee
Orozco the Embalmer	2001	Kiyotaka Tsurisaki	Kiyotaka Tsurisaki
Orwell: 2+2=5	2025	Raoul Peck	Raoul Peck, Alex Gibney, Nick Shumaker
Orwell Rolls in His Grave	2003	Robert Kane Pappas	Robert Kane Pappas, Miriam Foley
Oscar Peterson: Black + White	2021	Barry Avrich	Barry Avrich, Mark Selby
Otaku Unite!	2004	Eric Bresler	Movies of My Dreams
Other F Word, The	2011	Andrea Blaugrund Nevins	Cristan Crocker-Reilly
Other Fellow, The	2022	Matthew Bauer	Michelle Brøndum
Other One: The Long Strange Trip of Bob Weir, The	2015	Mike Fleiss	Marc Weingarten, Martin Hilton, Justin Kreutzmann, Sam Kropf
Other Side of AIDS, The	2004	Robin Scovill	Robin Scovill and Eric E. Paulson
Ott Tänak: The Movie	2019	Tarvo Mölder	Eero Nõgene
Our Body	2023	Claire Simon	Kristina Larsen
Our Curse	2013	Tomasz Śliwiński	
Our Daily Bread	2005	Nikolaus Geyrhalter	Nikolaus Geyrhalter, Markus Glaser, Michael Kitzberger, Wolfgang Widerhofer
Our Forbidden Places	2008	Leïla Kilani	Socco Chico
Our Generation	2010	Sinem Saban, Damien Curtis	
Our Nixon	2013	Penny Lane	Brian L. Frye, Penny Lane
Our School	2007	Kim Myeong-joon	
Out in the Silence	2009	Joe Wilson, Dean Hamer	Joe Wilson, Dean Hamer
Out of Bounds	2005	Alexandre Leborgne, Pierre Barougier	Alexandre Leborgne
Out of Mind, Out of Sight	2014	John Kastner	John Kastner
Out of Place	2009	Scott Ditzenberger and Darrin McDonald	
Out of Plain Sight	2024	Daniel Straub and Rosanna Xia	Austin Straub, Daniel Straub and Rosanna Xia
Out of the Blue	2003	James Fox, Tim Coleman, Boris Zubov	Boris Zubov
Out of the Past	1998	Jeff Dupre	Eliza Byard, Jeff Dupre, Michelle Ferrari
Out of the Shadow	2004	Susan Smiley	
Outback Patrol	1952	Lee Robinson	Stanley Hawes
Outer Space Connection, The	1975	Fred Warshofsky	Alan Landsburg
Outfoxed: Rupert Murdoch's War on Journalism	2004	Robert Greenwald	Robert Greenwald
Outrage	2009	Kirby Dick	Nicholas Jarecki
Outsider, The	2005	Nicholas Jarecki	Amy Ziering
Overnight	2003	Tony Montana and Mark Brian Smith	Tony Montana and Mark Brian Smith

== P ==
† = Series

Title	Year	Director(s)	Producer(s)
P.S. Burn This Letter Please	2020	Michael Seligman, Jennifer Tiexiera	Michael Seligman, Jennifer Tiexiera, Craig Olsen
P4W: Prison for Women	1981	Janis Cole, Holly Dale	
Paavo, a Life in Five Courses	2010	Hanna Hemilä	Hanna Hemilä
Pageant	2008	Ron Davis, Stewart Halpern	Ron Davis, Stewart Halpern
Pakucha	2021	Tito Catacora	Óscar Catacora
Palio	2015	Cosima Spender	
Pamela, a Love Story	2023	Ryan White	
Panama Deception, The	1992	Barbara Trent	Joanne Doroshow, David Kasper, Nico Panigutti, and Barbara Trent
Paper Clips	2004	Elliot Berlin and Joe Fab	The Johnson Group
Paper Dolls	2006	Tomer Heymann	Claudia Levin, Stanley Buchthal, Tomer Heymann
Paperback Dreams	2008	Alex Beckstead	Alex Beckstead
Pappano's Essential Ring Cycle	2013		Helen Mansfield
Paradise Lost: The Child Murders at Robin Hood Hills	1996	Joe Berlinger and Bruce Sinofsky	Joe Berlinger, Bruce Sinofsky
Paradise Lost 2: Revelations	2000	Joe Berlinger and Bruce Sinofsky	Joe Berlinger, Bruce Sinofsky
Paradise Lost 3: Purgatory	2011	Joe Berlinger and Bruce Sinofsky	Joe Berlinger, Bruce Sinofsky
Paralyzed by Hope: The Maria Bamford Story	2026	Judd Apatow, Neil Berkeley	Judd Apatow, Neil Berkeley, David Heiman, Amanda Rohlke
Pasión artesanal, La	2021	Roberto Barba	Roberto Barba, César Cornejo
Passion for Churches, A	1974	Edward Mirzoeff	Edward Mirzoeff
The Passionate Pursuits of Angela Bowen	2016	Jennifer Abod and Mary Duprey	
Pater Damiaan terug	1936	Clemens De Landtsheer	
Patsy Mink: Ahead of the Majority	2008	Kimberlee Bassford	Kimberlee Bassford
Patti Smith: Dream of Life	2008	Steven Sebring	Margaret Smilow and Scott Vogel
Paul	2025	Denis Côté	Karine Bélanger, Hany Ouichou
Paul Monette: The Brink of Summer's End	1996	Monte Bramer	Lesli Klainberg
Pavarotti	2019	Ron Howard	
Paw Project, The	2013	Jennifer Conrad	
Peace, Propaganda & the Promised Land	2004	Sut Jhally, Bathsheba Ratzkoff	
Peace Officer	2015	Scott Christopherson and Brad Barber	Scott Christopherson, Brad Barber, and Dave Lawrence
Peaceable Kingdom	2004	Jenny Stein	James LaVeck
Peaceable Kingdom: The Journey Home	2009	Jenny Stein	James LaVeck
People of the Cumberland	1937	Sidney Meyers, Jay Leyda	
Peasant Chronicle in Gruyere, A	1990	Jacqueline Veuve	Thierry Garrel and Jacqueline Veuve
Pedigree Dogs Exposed	2008		Jemima Harrison
Pedigree Dogs Exposed: Three Years On	2012		Jemima Harrison
Peggy Guggenheim: Art Addict	2015	Lisa Immordino Vreeland	Dan Braun, David Koh, Stanley F. Buchthal, and Lisa Immordino Vreeland
Pennsylvania Diners and Other Roadside Restaurants	1993	Rick Sebak	
People vs. George Lucas, The	2010	Alexandre O. Philippe	Anna Higgs, Robert Muratore, Vanessa Philippe, Kerry Deignan Roy
People vs. Paul Crump, The	1962	William Friedkin	Sterling "Red" Quinlan
Perfect Bid: The Contestant Who Knew Too Much	2017	CJ Wallis	CJ Wallis, Mallory Kennedy
Perfect Neighbor, The	2025	Geeta Gandbhir	Alisa Payne, Geeta Gandbhir, Nikon Kwantu, Sam Bisbee
Perkele! Kuvia Suomesta	1971	Jörn Donner, Jaakko Talaskivi, Erkki Seiro	
Perpetual Person	2020	Javier Bellido Valdivia	Javier Bellido Valdivia
Persistence of Vision	2012	Kevin Schreck	Kevin Schreck
Persona Non Grata	2003	Oliver Stone	
Personal History of the Australian Surf, A	1981	Michael Blakemore	
Personals, The: Improvisations on Romance in the Golden Years	1998	Keiko Ibi	Keiko Ibi
Pervert's Guide to Cinema, The	2006	Sophie Fiennes	Sophie Fiennes, Georg Misch, Martin Rosenbaum, Ralph Wieser
Pervert's Guide to Ideology, The	2012	Sophie Fiennes	Sophie Fiennes, Katie Holly, Martin Rosenbaum, James Wilson
PET FOOLED	2016	Kohl Harrington	Michael Fossat
Petite Morte, La	2003	Emmanuelle Schick Garcia	Emmanuelle Schick Garcia
Petropolis: Aerial Perspectives on the Alberta Tar Sands	2009	Peter Mettler	Sandy Hunter, Laura Severinac
Peuple en marche	1963	René Vautier	
Photographic Memory	2011	Ross McElwee	Marie-Emmanuelle Hartness, Ross McElwee
Photographic Memory, A	2024	Rachel Elizabeth Seed	Rachel Elizabeth Seed, Sigrid Dyekjær, Matt Perniciaro, Michael Sherman, Beth Levison, Danielle Varga
Pick of the Litter	2018	Don Hardy, Dana Nachman	Don Hardy, Dana Nachman
Picture of Light	1994	Peter Mettler	Peter Mettler, Alexandra Rockingham Gill, Ingrid Veninger
Piece by Piece	2005	Nic Hill	Nic Hill
Pig Business	2009	Tracy Worcester	Tracy Worcester, Alastair Kenneil
Pilgrimage	2001	Werner Herzog	
Pink Smoke over the Vatican	2011	Jules Hart	
Pirate Tapes, The	2011	Andrew Moniz, Rock Baijnauth	
Place at the Table, A	2012	Kristi Jacobson, Lori Silverbush	Julie Goldman, Ryan Harrington
Place Between, A – The Story of an Adoption	2007	Curtis Kaltenbaugh	Joe MacDonald
Place Called Chiapas, A	1998	Nettie Wild	Betsy Carson, Kirk Tougas, and Nettie Wild
Place in the Land, A	1998	Charles Guggenheim	
Place in Time, A	2007	Angelina Jolie	Sam Connelly, Holly Goline
Place to Live, A	1941	Irving Lerner	
Plagues & Pleasures on the Salton Sea	2004	Chris Metzler and Jeff Springer	Chris Metzler
Plan C	2023	Tracy Droz Tragos	Tracy Droz Tragos
Planeat	2010	Or Shlomi, Shelley Lee Davies	Or Shlomi, Shelley Lee Davies, Christopher Hird
Planet of the Humans	2019	Jeff Gibbs	Jeff Gibbs, Ozzie Zehner
Plastic Galaxy	2014	Brian Stillman	Brian Stillman, Karl Tate
Playing Columbine	2008	Danny Ledonne	Danny Ledonne
Plow That Broke the Plains, The	1936	Pare Lorentz	Resettlement Administration
Poétique du cerveau	2015	Nurith Aviv	Serge Lalou, Farid Rezkallah, Itai Tamir
Poetry in Motion	1982	Ron Mann	Ron Mann
Point and Shoot	2014	Marshall Curry	Marshall Curry, Elizabeth Martin, Matthew VanDyke
Point of Order	1964	Emile de Antonio	Emile de Antonio and Dan Talbot
Pola Negri: Life is a Dream in Cinema	2006	Mariusz Kotowski	Bright Shining City Productions
Polar Bears: A Summer Odyssey	2012	Sarah Robertson	Adam Ravetch, Tim O'Brien
Police Tapes, The	1977	Alan Raymond, Susan Raymond	
Policing the Plains	1927	Arthur D. Kean	Arthur D. Kean
POM Wonderful Presents: The Greatest Movie Ever Sold	2011	Morgan Spurlock	Jeremy Chilnick, Keith Calder, Abbie Hurewitz, Morgan Spurlock, and Jessica Wu
Pond Hockey	2008	Tommy Haines	Tommy Haines, Andrew Sherburne, JT Haines, and Nick Deutsch
Popatopolis	2009	Clay Westervelt	Clay Westervelt
Porn Star: The Legend of Ron Jeremy	2001	Scott J. Gill	Kirt Eftekhar
Porndemic	2018	Brendan Spookie Daly	Brendan Spookie Daly and Evan Krauss
Porotos de soja	2009	David Blaustein, Osvaldo Daicich	
Porto of My Childhood	2001	Manoel de Oliveira	Paulo Branco
Portrait of Gina	1958	Orson Welles	ABC TV
Portrait of a Lone Farmer	2013	Jide Tom Akinleminu	Jide Tom Akinleminu
Portrait Werner Herzog	1986	Werner Herzog	Lucki Stipetic
Possessed, The	2009	Christopher Saint Booth, Philip Adrian Booth	Christopher Saint Booth
Poster Boy: Becoming Zyzz	2026	Selina Miles	Tom Blackwell, Gal Greenspan, Anu Hasbold
Powaqqatsi: Life in Transformation	1988	Godfrey Reggio	Mel Lawrence, Godfrey Reggio, and Lawrence Taub
Power of Big Oil, The †	2022	Jane McMullen, Gesbeen Mohammad, Robin Barnwell	Sara Obeidat
Power of Forgiveness, The	2008	Martin Doblmeier	Dan Juday, Adele Schmidt
Pray for Japan	2012	Stu Levy	Toru Kajio, Ray Klein, Stu Levy, and Kazunori Noguchi
Pray the Devil Back to Hell	2008	Gini Reticker	Abigail E. Disney
Predictions of Fire	1996	Michael Benson	Michael Benson and Milan Blazin
Prequels Strike Back: A Fan's Journey, The	2016	Bradley Weatherholt	Kyle Brodeur, Matthew Todd Fielder, Frank Zoch, Bradley Weatherholt
President McKinley Inauguration Footage	1901	Thomas Edison	
Pretty Bloody: The Women of Horror	2009	Donna Davies	Kimberlee McTaggart
Prey	2019	Matt Gallagher	Matt Gallagher, Cornelia Principe
Price of Sugar, The	2007	Bill Haney	Haney Grunebaum, Eric Grunebaum
Pride Divide	1997	Paris Poirier	Paris Poirier and Karen Kiss
Primary	1960	Robert Drew	Robert Drew
Prime Minister	2025	Lindsay Utz, Michelle Walshe	Cass Avery, Leon Kirkbeck, Gigi Pritzker, Rachel Shane, Katie Peck, Clarke Gayford
Prince Among Slaves	2006	Andrea Kalin, Bill Duke	Andrea Kalin
Princesa de África	2008	Juan Laguna	Producciones Berebería
Principle, The	2014	Katheryne Thomas	Rick DeLano, Robert Sungenis
Print the Legend	2014	Luis Lopez, J. Clay Tweel	Seth Gordon, Steven Klein, Dan O'Meara, Chad Troutwine
Prison Ball	2004	Jason Moriarty	Jason Moriarty, Stephen Belafonte, Michael Butler, Theo Rozsa
Prison in Twelve Landscapes, The	2016	Brett Story	Brett Story
Prison Terminal: The Last Days of Private Jack Hall	2013	Edgar Barens	Edgar Barens
Prison Town, USA	2007	Katie Galloway, Po Kutchins	Katie Galloway, Po Kutchins
Prisoner of Paradise	2002	Malcolm Clarke, Stuart Sender	Karl-Eberhard Schäfer
Prisoners of a White God	2008	Steve Lichtag	Tomáš Ryška
Problem with Apu, The	2017	Michael Melamedoff	Michael Melamedoff, Michael J. Cargill
Procedure 769, Witness to an Execution	1995	Jaap van Hoewijk	
Prodigal Sons	2008	Kimberly Reed	Kimberly Reed
Professional Revolutionary: The Life of Saul Wellman	2004		Judith Montell, Ronald Aronson
Programming the Nation?	2011	Jeff Warrick	Marty Collins
Project Grizzly	1996	Peter Lynch	Michael Allder
Project Nim	2011	James Marsh	Simon Chinn
Prom Night in Mississippi	2009	Paul Saltzman	Paul Saltzman, Patricia Aquino
Prophet's Prey	2015	Amy J. Berg	Katherine LeBlond and Sam Brower
Prosecution of an American President, The	2012	Dave Hagen, David J. Burke	Jim Shaban
Protected: The Truth About Palm Island	1975	Carolyn Strachan	Alessandro Cavadini
Protocols of Zion	2005	Marc Levin	Steve Kalafer, Marc Levin
Providence Effect, The	2009	Rollin Binzer	Rollin Binzer, Tom Hurvis
Psychedelia	2015	Pat Murphy	Pat Murphy
Psycho Legacy, The	2010	Robert Galluzzo	Robert Galluzzo, Anthony Masi
Pucker Up: The Fine Art of Whistling	2005	Kate Davis, David Heilbroner	Kate Davis, David Heilbroner
Pull Out	2004	Jyllian Gunther	Wren Arthur, Jyllian Gunther, Jonathan Shoemaker
Pumping Iron	1977	George Butler	Jerome Gary
Pumping Iron II: The Women	1985	George Butler	George Butler
Punk Jews	2012	Jesse Zook Mann	Saul Sudin, Evan Kleinman
Punk's Not Dead	2007	Susan Dynner	Susan Dynner and Todd Traina
Punk Singer, The	2013	Sini Anderson	Sini Anderson and Tamra Davis
Pursuit of Equality	2005	Geoff Callan, Mike Shaw	Geoff Callan
Pushcarts and Plantations: Jewish Life in Louisiana	1998	Brian Cohen	
Python Hunt, The	2025	Xander Robin	Xander Robin, Lance Oppenheim, Mel Oppenheim, Lauren Cioffi

== Q ==
† = Series

Title	Year	Director(s)	Producer(s)
Qimmit, a Clash of Two Truths	2010	Joelie Sanguya, Ole Gjerstad	
QT8: The First Eight	2019	Tara Wood	Tara Wood, Jake Zortman
Quantum Hoops	2007	Rick Greenwald	Rick Greenwald
Queen, The	1968	Frank Simon	Don Herbert, Si Litvinoff
Queendom	2023	Agniya Galdanova	Agniia Galdanova, Igor Myakotin
Queen of Chess	2026	Rory Kennedy	Mark Bailey, Keven McAlester
Queen of the Sun: What Are the Bees Telling Us?	2010	Taggart Siegel	Jon Betz
Queen of Versailles, The	2012	Lauren Greenfield	Lauren Greenfield, Danielle Renfrew Behrens
Queens at Heart	1967		
Queens of Comedy, The	2001	Steve Purcell	Walter Latham
Queercore: How to Punk a Revolution	2017	Yony Leyser	Thomas Janze, Yony Leyser
Quest	2017	Jonathan Olshefski	Sabrina Schmidt Gordon
Quest of Alain Ducasse, The	2017	Gilles de Maistre	Vivien Aslanian, Gilles de Maistre, Romain Le Grand, Stéphane Simon
Quiet Epidemic, The	2022	Lindsay Keys, Winslow Crane-Murdoch	Chris Hegedus, Lindsay Keys, Daria Lombroso
Quinceañera, La	2007	Adam Taub	Adam Taub
Quincy	2018	Alan Hicks, Rashida Jones	Paula DuPré Pesmen

== R ==
† = Series

Title	Year	Director(s)	Producer(s)
Rabbi Goes West, The	2019	Amy Geller, Gerald Peary	Amy Geller
Rabbit à la Berlin	2009	Bartek Konopka	Anna Wydra
Rabbit Fever	2009	Amy Do	Amy Do, Daniel D. Gregoire
Racing Dreams	2009	Marshall Curry	Marshall Curry, Bristol Baughan
Racing Extinction	2015	Louie Psihoyos	Fisher Stevens and Olivia Ahnemann
Racing Scene, The	1969	Andy Sidaris	James Garner, Barry Scholer
Radiance: The Experience of Light	1978	Dorothy Fadiman	Michael Wiese
Radiant City	2006	Gary Burns and Jim Brown	Bonnie Thompson and Shirley Vercruysse
Race to Nowhere	2009	Vicki Abeles and Jessica Congdon	Vicki Abeles
Ram Ke Naam	1992	Anand Patwardhan	Anand Patwardhan
Rampage	2006	George Gittoes	
Rats	2016	Morgan Spurlock	Jeremy Chilnick, Morgan Spurlock
Rats & Bullies: The Dawn-Marie Wesley Story	2004	Ray Buffer and Roberta McMillan	Ray Buffer and Roberta McMillan
Raw Opium	2011	Peter Findlay	Robert Lang
RBG	2018	Betsy West, Julie Cohen	Betsy West, Julie Cohen
Reaction: A Portrait of a Society in Crisis	1973	Robin Spry	Tom Daly
Reagan	2011	Eugene Jarecki	
Real Dirt on Farmer John, The	2005	Taggart Siegel	Taggart Siegel and Teri Lang
Reality Winner	2021	Sonia Kennebeck	Sonia Kennebeck, Ines Hofmann Kanna
Reaper, The	2013	Gabriel Serra Argüello	Henner Hofmann, Karla Bukantz
Reason to Live, A	2009	Allen Mondell, Cynthia Salzman Mondell	Allen Mondell, Cynthia Salzman Mondell
Rebels on Pointe	2017	Bobbi Jo Hart	Bobbi Jo Hart, Robbie Hart
Recipe for Murder	2011	Sonia Bible	
Reconstruction	2001	Irene Lusztig	
Recovered: Journeys Through the Autism Spectrum and Back	2008	Michele Jaquis and Dr. Doreen Granpeesheh	Dr. Doreen Granpeesheh
Recruiting for Jihad	2017	Adel Khan Farooq, Ulrik Imtiaz Rolfsen	
Red Fever	2024	Neil Diamond, Catherine Bainbridge	Lisa M. Roth
Red Obsession	2013	David Roach, Warwick Ross	Warwick Ross
Redlight	2011	Guy Jacobson, Adi Ezroni, Charles Kiselyak	
Red State	2006	Michael Shea	Matthew F. Leonetti Jr., Lisa Lettunich, and Michael Shea
Red String, The	2004	Elizabeth Pearson	Elizabeth Pearson
Reel Bad Arabs	2006	Sut Jhally	Jeremy Earp
Reel Injun	2009	Neil Diamond, Catherine Bainbridge, Jeremiah Hayes	Catherine Bainbridge, Christina Fon, Linda Ludwick
Reflektor Tapes, The	2015	Kahlil Joseph	
Reincarnated	2012	Andy Capper	Codine Williams, Justin Li
Refusenik	2008	Laura Bialis	Laura Bialis and Stephanie Howard
Reggie	2023	Alex Stapleton	Daniel Crown, Chris Leggett, Yoni Liebling, Rafael Marmor, Alex Stapleton
Religieuses abusées, l'autre scandale de l'Église	2019	Eric Quintin and Marie-Pierre Raimbault	
Religulous	2008	Larry Charles	Bill Maher, Jonah Smith, and Palmer West
Remake	2025	Ross McElwee	Ross McElwee, Mark Meatto
Rembrandt's J'Accuse	2008	Peter Greenaway	Bruno Felix, Femke Wolting
Remembering Arthur	2006	Martin Lavut	Dennis Mohr
Remembering Gene Wilder	2023	Ron Frank	Julie Nimoy, David Knight
Reminiscences	2010	Juan Daniel F. Molero	Juan Daniel F. Molero
Reminiscences of a Journey to Lithuania	1972	Jonas Mekas	
Rendezvous with Death	2006	Wilfried Huismann	Heribert Blondiau, Wilfried Huismann, Gus Russo
Renewal	2008	Marty Ostrow, Terry Kay Rockefeller	Marty Ostrow, Terry Kay Rockefeller
Renzo Gracie: Legacy	2008	Gethin Aldous	Gethin Aldous
Rescue, The	2021	Elizabeth Chai Vasarhelyi, Jimmy Chin	Elizabeth Chai Vasarhelyi, Jimmy Chin, John Battsek, P. J. van Sandwijk, Bob Eisenhardt
Restoring Tomorrow	2017	Aaron Wolf	Timothy Nuttall
Restrepo	2010	Tim Hetherington, Sebastian Junger	Sebastian Junger, Tim Hetherington
Resurrect Dead: The Mystery of the Toynbee Tiles	2011	Jon Foy	Jon Foy and Colin Smith
Retrograde	2022	Matthew Heineman	Matthew Heineman and Caitlin McNally
Revolution	2012	Rob Stewart	Rob Stewart
Revolution OS	2001	J. T. S. Moore	J. T. S. Moore
Revolution Will Not Be Televised, The	2003	Kim Bartley, Donnacha Ó Briain	David Power
Revolving Door, The	1968	Lee R. Bobker	Lee R. Bobker
Rewind This!	2013	Josh Johnson	Midori Inoue, Carolee Mitchell
Richard Cardinal: Cry from a Diary of a Métis Child	1986	Alanis Obomsawin	
Richard Hammond Meets Evel Knievel	2007	Nigel Simpkiss	Ben Devlin
Riding Solo to the Top of the World	2006	Gaurav Jani	Dirt Track Productions
Rien que les heures	1926	Alberto Cavalcanti	Alberto Cavalcanti
Right to Die?	2007	John Zaritsky	
Ring of Fire	1991	George Casey	George Casey and Paul Novros
RiP!: A Remix Manifesto	2008	Brett Gaylor	Mila Aung-Thwin, Kat Baulu, Germaine Ying Gee Wong
Rise Above: The Tribe 8 Documentary	2004	Tracy Flannigan	
Rise and Rise of Bitcoin, The	2014	Nicholas Mross	
Rise of Jordan Peterson, The	2019	Patricia Marcoccia	Patricia Marcoccia
Rising Tide, The	1949	Jean Palardy	James Beveridge
Risk	2016	Laura Poitras	
Rita Dove: An American Poet	2013	Eduardo Montes-Bradley	Heritage Film Project
Rita Moreno: Just a Girl Who Decided to Go for It	2021	Mariem Pérez Riera	Mariem Pérez Riera, Brent Miller
River	2021	Jennifer Peedom	Jo-Anne McGowan, Jennifer Peedom, John Smithson
River, The	1938	Pare Lorentz	Farm Security Administration
RoachTrip	2003	Eric Denis	
Road to Mecca, A - The Journey of Muhammad Asad	2008	Georg Misch	Ralph Wieser, Georg Misch
Road to the Big Leagues	2007	Jared Goodman	Eran Lobel, Jared Goodman
Roadrunner: A Film About Anthony Bourdain	2021	Morgan Neville	Morgan Neville, Caitrin Rogers
Roam Sweet Home	1996	Ellen Spiro	Ellen Spiro
Road Between Us, The: The Ultimate Rescue	2025	Barry Avrich	Barry Avrich, Mark Selby
Road We've Traveled, The	2012	Davis Guggenheim	Lisa Remington
Robert Blecker Wants Me Dead	2008	Ted Schillinger	Bruce David Klein
Robert Kennedy Remembered	1968		Charles Guggenheim
Robin Williams: Come Inside My Mind	2018	Marina Zenovich	Alex Gibney, Shirel Kozak
Robin's Wish	2020	Tylor Norwood	Ben Sinclair, Tylor Norwood
Rock 'n' Roll Junkie	1994	Jan Eilander, Eugene Van Den Bosch, Ton Van Der Lee, Frenk Van Der Sterre	Ton Van Der Lee
Rock and a Hard Place	2017	Matthew O'Neill, Jon Alpert	Susan Carney
Rock Hudson's Home Movies	1992	Mark Rappaport	
Roger & Me	1989	Michael Moore	Michael Moore
Rolling Papers	2015	Mitch Dickman	
Romeo Is Bleeding	2015	Jason Zeldes	Michael Klein
Room 237	2012	Rodney Ascher	Tim Kirk
Room Full of Spoons	2016	Rick Harper	
Roosevelt, New Jersey: Visions of Utopia	1983	Richard Kroehling	Richard Kroehling
Roosevelt in Africa	1910	Cherry Kearton	
Roosevelt Story, The	1947	Lawrence M. Klee	Martin Levine, Oliver A. Unger
Root of All Evil?, The	2006	Russell Barnes	Alan Clements
Roots of Fundamentalism, The	2005	Jon Monday	Jon Monday
Romantic Comedy	2019	Elizabeth Sankey	Jeremy Warmsley, Oskar Pimlott, Maria Chiara Ventura
Rose Kennedy: A Life to Remember	1990	Terry Sanders	Freida Lee Mock and Terry Sanders
Rosenwald: A Remarkable Story of a Jewish Partnership with African American Communities	2015	Aviva Kempner	
Round Eyes in the Middle Kingdom	1995	Ronald Levaco	Ronald Levaco
Royal Hangover, A	2014	Arthur Cauty	Arthur Cauty
RRR: Behind and Beyond	2024		D. V. V. Danayya
Ruins of the Reich†	2007	R. J. Adams	Diane C. Adams
Rubble Kings	2015	Shan Nicholson	
Run Terry Run	2025	Sean Menard	Sean Menard, Molly Ye
Running from Crazy	2013	Barbara Kopple	Barbara Kopple, David Cassidy
Running with Beto	2019	David Modigliani	David Modigliani, Rebecca Feferman, Nancy Schafer, Rachel Ecklund, Greg Kwedar, Michelle Modigliani
Rush to Judgment	1967	Emile de Antonio	
Rusted Caravaggios	2020	Sam Abbas	
Ryan	2004	Chris Landreth	Steven Hoban, Mark Smith, Marcy Page

== S ==
† = Series

Title	Year	Director(s)	Producer(s)
S&Man	2006	J.T. Petty	Jason Kliot, Lawrence Mattis, and Joana Vicente
Sabbath in Paradise	1997	Claudia Heuermann	Claudia Heuermann, Jonathan Berman, Andreas Wildbihler
Sacred Duty, A: Applying Jewish values to help heal the world	2007	Lionel Friedberg	Lionel Friedberg
Sacred Planet	2004	Jon Long	Jon Long and Karen Fernandez Long
Sacro GRA	2013	Gianfranco Rosi	
Sagat: The Documentary	2011	Pascal Roche, Jérôme M. De Oliveira	
Saimaa Gesture, The	1981	Aki and Mika Kaurismäki	Aki and Mika Kaurismäki
Saigon, U.S.A.	2004	Lindsey Jang and Robert C. Winn	Lindsey Jang and Robert C. Winn
Salad Days: A Decade of Punk in Washington, DC (1980–90)	2014	Scott Crawford	Lindsey Jang and Robert C. Winn
Salesman	1969	Albert Maysles, David Maysles, and Charlotte Zwerin	Albert Maysles and David Maysles
Sally	2025	Cristina Costantini	Cristina Costantini, Lauren Cioffi, Dan Cogan, Jon Bardin
Salt of the Earth: Palestinian Christians in the Northern West Bank	2004	Marthame and Elizabeth Sanders	Marthame Sanders, Elizabeth Sanders
Saltmen of Tibet, The†	1997	Ulrike Koch	Christoph Bicker, Alfi Sinniger, Knut Winkler
Samsara	2011	Ron Fricke	Mark Magidson
Sanatorium	2025	Gar O'Rourke	Andrew Freedman, Ken Wardrop, Samantha Corr
Sand and Sorrow	2007	Paul Freedman	Paul Freedman, Bradley Kaplan
Sands of Silence: Waves of Courage	2016	Chelo Alvarez-Stehle	Chelo Alvarez-Stehle
Santa Camp	2022	Nick Sweeney	Stacey Reiss, Nick Sweeney, Joseph Purfield
Sarah Palin: You Betcha!	2011	Nick Broomfield, Joan Churchill	Marc Hoeferlin, Cassian Elwes, Marc Hoeferlin
Sasquatch: Legend Meets Science	2001	Doug Hajicek	Doug Hajicek
Satan Wants You	2023	Steve J. Adams, Sean Horlor	Michael Grand, Melissa James
Satanis: The Devil's Mass	1970	Ray Laurent	Ray Laurent
Savage Art, A: The Life & Cartoons of Pat Oliphant	2025	Bill Banowsky	Bill Banowsky, Paul O'Bryan
Savana violenta	1976	Antonio Climati, Mario Morra	Franco Prosperi
Save KLSD	2012	Jon Monday	Jon Monday, Jennifer Douglas
Saved, The	1998	Paul Cohen, Oeke Hoogendijk	Eddy Wijngaarde
Saving Barbara Sizemore	2016	David J. Steiner	David J. Steiner
Scared Sacred	2004	Velcrow Ripper	
Scared Straight!	1978	Arnold Shapiro	Arnold Shapiro
Scenes of a Crime	2012	Blue Hadaegh	Grover Babcock
Score: A Film Music Documentary	2016	Matt Schrader	Robert Kraft, Trevor Thompson, and others
Science Moms	2017	Natalie Newell	Natalie Newell
Scottsboro: An American Tragedy	2001	Daniel Anker and Barak Goodman	Daniel Anker and Barak Goodman
Scott Walker: 30 Century Man	2006	Stephen Kijak	
Scout's Honor	2001	Tom Shepard	Tom Shepard
Scream, Queen! My Nightmare on Elm Street	2019	Roman Chimienti, Tyler Jensen	Roman Chimienti, Mark Patton
SCTV: The Greatest Show You've Never Heard Of	2026	Jason Hehir	Chapman Downes, Andrew Hafnor, Whitney Johnson, Kelly Meinhardt, Molly Montgomery
Sea of Shadows	2019	Richard Ladkani	Wolfgang Knöpfler, Walter Köhler
Seafarers, The	1953	Stanley Kubrick	Lester Cooper
Seal Island	1948	James Algar	The Walt Disney Company
Sea Monsters: A Prehistoric Adventure	2007	Sean MacLeod Phillips	National Geographic Society
Search for General Tso, The	2014	Ian Cheney	Jennifer 8. Lee, Amanda Murray
Search for Kennedy's PT 109, The	2002	Peter Getzels	
Search for the Truth	2007		
Search for the Super Battery	2017	Daniel McCabe	Daniel McCabe
Searching for the Roots of 9/11	2003		
Searching for the Wrong-Eyed Jesus	2003	Andrew Douglas	Daniel McCabe
Seaspiracy	2021	Ali Tabrizi	Kip Andersen
Second Skin	2008	Juan Carlos Pineiro-Escoriaza	Peter Schieffelin Brauer and Victor M. Piñeiro III
Secret, The	2006	Drew Heriot	Paul Harrington, Rhonda Byrne
Secret History of 9/11, The	2006	Terence McKenna	
Secret History of Hacking, The	2001	Ralph Lee	Mira King
Secret Lives: Hidden Children and Their Rescuers During WWII	2002	Aviva Slesin	
Secret Mall Apartment	2024	Jeremy Workman	Jeremy Workman
Secret of Selling the Negro, The	1954		
Secrets of the Tribe	2010	José Padilha	Carol Nahra, Marcos Prado, Mike Chamberlain
Secrets of the Vatican	2014	Antony Thomas	Antony Thomas
Seeds of Destiny	1946	David Miller	
Seeing Eye, The	1951	Owen Crump	Gordon Hollingshead
Seeing Through the Darkness (Les yeux ne font pas le regard)	2024	Simon Plouffe	Simon Plouffe
Seeking Mavis Beacon	2024	Jazmin Renée Jones	Guetty Felin
Seguridad	2024	Tamara Segura	
Seine Meets Paris, The	1957	Joris Ivens	Jacques Prévert
Seized	2026	Sharon Liese	Sharon Liese, Sasha Alpert, Paul Matyasovsky
Selena y Los Dinos	2025	Isabel Castro	Julie Goldman, Christopher Clements, J. Daniel Torres, David Blackman, Simran A. Singh
Sembene!	2015	Samba Gadjigo and Jason Silverman	
Senna	2010	Asif Kapadia	Chris Berend, Tim Bevan, Eric Fellner, James Gay-Rees
Seoul Train	2005	Jim Butterworth, Aaron Lubarsky, and Lisa Sleeth	Jim Butterworth and Lisa Sleeth
September Issue, The	2009	R. J. Cutler	Sadia Shepard
Serengeti Symphony	1998	Hugo van Lawick	
Sertão das Memórias, O	1997	José Araújo	
Seven Tapes, The	2012	Yair Qedar	
Sex: The Annabel Chong Story	1999	Gough Lewis	Gough Lewis, Kelly Morris, Peter Carr
Sex-Business: Made in Pasing	1970	Hans-Jürgen Syberberg	Hans-Jürgen Syberberg
Sex Crimes and the Vatican	2006		Sarah MacDonald
Sex Slaves	2005	Ric Esther Bienstock	Ric Esther Bienstock, Felix Golubev, and Simcha Jacobovici
Seymour: An Introduction	2014	Ethan Hawke	
Shakers, The	1974	Tom Davenport	Tom Davenport and Frank DeCola
Shakers, The: Hands to Work, Hearts to God	1984	Ken Burns, Amy Stechler	Ken Burns, Amy Stechler
Shame of a City, The	2006	Tigre Hill	Tigre Hill and Omar Williams
Shape of the Moon	2004	Leonard Retel Helmrich	Hetty Naaijkens-Retel Helmrich for Scarabeefilms
Shark Is Still Working, The	2006	Erik Hollander	James Gelet, Jake Gove, Erik Hollander, and Michael Roddy
Sharksploitation	2023	Stephen Scarlata	Stephen Scarlata, Kerry Deignan Roy, Josh Miller
Sharkwater	2007	Rob Stewart	Rob Stewart
She	2025	Parsifal Reparato	Parsifal Reparato, Quentin Laurent, Pier Francesco Aiello, Emma Ferulano
Shelter Dogs	2003	Cynthia Wade	Cynthia Wade
Sherman's March	1986	Ross McElwee	
Sherpa	2015	Jennifer Peedom	John Smithson, Bridget Ikin
Shikashika	2008	Stephen James Hyde	Stephen James Hyde
Shoah	1985	Claude Lanzmann	Historia Films, Les Films Aleph and Ministère de la Culture de la Republique Française
Shocking Asia	1974	Rolf Olsen	Wolfgang von Schiber
Shocking Asia II: The Last Taboos	1985	Rolf Olsen	Wolfgang von Schiber
Shonar Beri	1987	Tareque Masud	
Shoot Down	2006	Cristina Khuly	Gloria Bremer, Larry Confino, Douglas Eger
Shoot to Marry	2020	Steve Markle	Steve Markle
Shooting Bigfoot	2013	Morgan Matthews	Ben Chanan, Jo Hughes, Morgan Matthews, Tara Nolan
Shooting the Mafia	2019	Kim Longinotto	Niamh Fagan
Shore Things	1996	Rick Sebak	Rick Sebak
Shores of Silence: Whale Sharks in India	2000	Mike Pandey	Mike Pandey
Short Cut to Nirvana: Kumbh Mela	2004	Maurizio Benazzo, Nick Day	Maurizio Benazzo, Nick Day
Short Documentary About a Giant Pencil, A	2026	Daniel Straub	Austin Straub, Daniel Straub, Bryce Cyrier
Short Life of Anne Frank, The	2001	Gerrit Netten	
Sicario, Room 164, El	2010	Gianfranco Rosi	Serge Lalou, Gianfranco Rosi
Sicko	2007	Michael Moore	Michael Moore and Meghan O'Hara
Side by Side	2012	Christopher Kenneally	Keanu Reeves, Justin Szlasa
Signs of the Time	2008	Don Casper	Don Casper, Jim Hughes
Silence of the Mole, The	2021	Anaïs Taracena	Rafael González, Anaïs Taracena
Silenced	2026	Selina Miles	Blayke Hoffman
Silent Historian, The	2011	Simonka de Jong	Jan de Ruiter, Niek Koppen, Anja Cloosterman for Selfmade Films
Silent Scream, The	1984	Bernard Nathanson	National Right to Life Committee
Silent World, The	1956	Jacques-Yves Cousteau and Louis Malle	Jacques-Yves Cousteau, Marcel Ichac, Jacques Mauger
SilkAir 185: Pilot Suicide?	2006		
Silver Fez, The	2009	Lloyd Ross	Joëlle Chesselet
Silver Screamers	2025	Sean Cisterna	Ivonete de Sousa, Sean Cisterna
Silvered Water, Syria Self-Portrait	2014	Ossama Mohammed, Wiam Simav Bedirxan	
Simply Johanne (Johanne, tout simplement)	2024	Nadine Valcin	
SING*ularity	2009	Brad Mays	Brad Mays, Lorenda Starfelt
Sinister Saga of Making "The Stunt Man", The	2001	Richard Rush	Richard Rush and Bart Pierce
Sins of My Father	2009	Nicolas Entel	Ivan Entel, Nicolas Entel
Sirius	2013	Amardeep Kaleka	
Sister Wife	2000	Timna Goldstein	Hadar Kleinman
Sisters on Track	2021	Tone Grøttjord-Glenne, Corinne van der Borch	Tone Grøttjord-Glenne, Anita Rehoff Larsen
Sixth, The	2024	Andrea Nix Fine, Sean Fine	Andrea Nix Fine, Sean Fine
Sixth Battalion, The	1998	Mirek Pazdera, Howard E. Green	Dušan Šimko, Mirek Pazdera
Sketches of Frank Gehry	2005	Sydney Pollack	Ultan Guilfoyle
Skies are Closer in Homesh, The	2004	Menora Hazani	
Skin: A History of Nudity in the Movies	2020	Danny Wolf	Paul Fishbein
Skin I'm In, The	2012	Broderick Fox	Lee Biolos, Broderick Fox
Skinheads USA: Soldiers of the Race War	1993	Shari Cookson	Shari Cookson
Skyjacker's Tale, The	2016	Jamie Kastner	Jamie Kastner
Skywalkers: A Love Story	2024	Jeff Zimbalist, Maria Bukhonina	Jeff Zimbalist, Maria Bukhonina, Tamir Ardon, Chris Smith, Nick Spicer
SlamNation	1998	Paul Devlin	Tom Poole and Michael Shaw
Slanted Screen, The	2006	Jeff Adachi	Jeff Adachi
Slasher: an IFC Original	2004	John Landis	Chris Kobin, Stephen Cantor, and Daniel Laikind
Sled Dogs	2016	Fern Levitt	Fern Levitt, Arnie Zipursky
Slice and Dice: The Slasher Film Forever	2012	Calum Waddell	Naomi Holwill, Calum Waddell
Slippin': Ten Years with the Bloods	2005	Joachim Schroeder, Tommy Sowards	Joachim Schroeder, Tommy Sowards
Sludge	2005	Robert Salyer	
Sly	2023	Thom Zimny	Sean Stuart
Sly Lives! (aka The Burden of Black Genius)	2025	Questlove	Amit Dey, Joseph Patel, Derik Murray
Small Act, A	2010	Jennifer Arnold	Jennifer Arnold, Patti Lee, Jeffrey Soros
Smash & Grab: The Story of the Pink Panthers	2013	Havana Marking	
Smashing Machine, The: The Life and Times of Extreme Fighter Mark Kerr	2002	Jon Greenhalgh	
Smoke Sauna Sisterhood	2023	Anna Hints	Marianne Ostrat
Snake and the Stallion, The	2002	Richard Symons	Hamish Barbour, Richard Klein
So Goes the Nation	2006	Adam Del Deo and James D. Stern	Adam Del Deo and James D. Stern
Sobral – O Homem que Não Tinha Preço	2013	Paula Fiuza	
Social Sin, The	2024	Juan Carlos Goicochea	Diana Castro
Sol	2014	Marie-Hélène Cousineau, Susan Avingaq	Marie-Hélène Cousineau, Stephane Rituit
Soldier Girls	1981	Nick Broomfield	Nick Broomfield
Sole Survivor	2013	Ky Dickens	Susan Aurinko, Ky Dickens, Alexis Jaworski, Amy McIntyre
Solitary: Inside Red Onion State Prison	2017	Kristi Jacobson	
Solo	2008	David Michôd, Jennifer Peedom	Jennifer Peedom
Some Kind of Heaven	2020	Lance Oppenheim	Darren Aronofsky
Someone Lives Here	2023	Zack Russell	Andrew Ferguson, Matt King, Zack Russell
Something Ventured	2011	Daniel Geller, Dayna Goldfine	Daniel Geller, Dayna Goldfine, Celeste Schaefer Snyder
Somm	2012	Jason Wise	Jackson Myers, Christina Tucker, Jason Wise
Somm: Into the Bottle	2015	Jason Wise	Jackson Myers, Christina Tucker, Jason Wise
Somm 3	2018	Jason Wise	Jackson Myers, Christina Tucker, Jason Wise
Son of al Qaeda	2004	Don Knox	
Song for Tibet, A	1991	Anne Henderson	Anne Henderson, Ali Kazimi, Kent Martin
Song Without Home, A	2026	Rati Tsiteladze	Olga Slusareva
Song of a Jewish Cowboy	2002	Bonnie Burt, Judith Montell	
Song of Ceylon	1934	Basil Wright	John Grierson
Song of the Butterflies, The	2020	Núria Frigola Torrent	Núria Frigola Torrent, Rolando Toledo Vega, Chela de Ferrari
Sons of Perdition	2010	Tyler Measom, Jennilyn Merten	Julie Golden, Tyler Measom, Jennilyn Merten
Sons of Shiva	1985	Robert Gardner, Askos Ostor	
Sons of Tennessee Williams, The	2010	Tim Wolff	Tim Wolff
Sorrow and the Pity, The	1971	Marcel Ophuls	André Harris and Alain de Sedouy
Sorry/Not Sorry	2023	Caroline Suh, Cara Mones	Caroline Suh, Cara Mones, Kathleen Lingo
Sotsgorod: Cities for Utopia	1996	Anna Abrahams	René Goossens, René Scholten
Soul Food Junkies	2012	Byron Hurt	Lisa Durden
Sound City	2013	Dave Grohl	Dave Grohl, James A. Rota, John Ramsay
Soundtrack to a Coup d'Etat	2024	Johan Grimonprez	Daan Milius, Rémi Grellety
Sour Grapes	2016	Jerry Rothwell, Reuben Atlas	Al Morrow, Catherine Simeon, Joshua Levine
Sous le Manteau	1948		
South of the Border	2009	Oliver Stone	
Space Cowboy	2024	Bryce Leavitt, Marah Strauch	Bryce Leavitt, Tyler Measom, Marah Strauch
Space to Grow, A	1968		Thomas P. Kelly Jr.
Spaces: The Architecture of Paul Rudolph	1983	Bob Eisenhardt	Bob Eisenhardt
Spanish Teen Rally	2014	Amparo Fortuny	Mikel Iribarren, Amparo Fortuny
Sparks Brothers, The	2021	Edgar Wright	Nira Park
Speak of the Devil	1993	Nick Bougas	Nick Bougas
Speak White	1980	Pierre Falardeau, Julien Poulin	
Speaking in Strings	1999	Paola di Florio	Paola di Florio and Lilibet Foster
Speciesism: The Movie	2013	Mark Devries	
Speed Sisters	2015	Amber Fares	Amber Fares, Avi Goldstein, Jessica Devaney
Spellbound	2002	Jeffrey Blitz	Jeffrey Blitz and Sean Welch
Spencer Halpin's Moral Kombat	2007	Spencer Halpin	Spencer Halpin and Ramy Katrib
Spit Earth: Who is Jordan Wolfson?	2020	James Crump	Ronnie Sassoon, James Crump
Spitfire 944	2006	William Lorton	William Lorton, Jason Savage
Split: Portrait of a Drag Queen	1993	Ellen Fisher Turk, Andrew Weeks	
Sportin' Life	2020	Abel Ferrara	Anthony Vaccarello, Gary Farkas, Clément Lepoutre, Olivier Muller, Diana Phillips
Square, The	1994	Zhang Yuan	Zhang Yuan
Square Grouper: The Godfathers of Ganja	2011	Billy Corben	Alfred Spellman, Billy Corben
Square One: Michael Jackson	2019	Danny Wu	Danny Wu
Squires of San Quentin	1978		J. Gary Mitchell
Sretno dijete	2003	Igor Mirković	Rajko Grlić
Sriracha	2013	Griffin Hammond	
St. Louis Superman	2019	Sami Khan, Smriti Mundhra	Sami Khan, Smriti Mundhra, Poh Si Teng, Cheyenne Tan
Stalags	2008	Ari Libsker	Barak Heymann, Ari Libsker
Stan Lee's Mutants, Monsters & Marvels	2002	Scott Zakarin	Eric Mittleman
Stans	2025	Steven Leckart	Antoine Fuqua, Eminem, Tony DiSanto, Stuart Parr, Paul Rosenberg
Standing in the Shadows of Motown	2002	Paul Justman	Paul Justman, Sandford Passman, and Allan Slutsky
Standard Operating Procedure	2008	Errol Morris	Julie Ahlberg
Standing Silent Nation	2006	Suree Towfighnia	Courtney Hermann
Star of Bethlehem, The	2007	Stephen Vidano	
Star Wars: Evolution of the Lightsaber Duel	2015	Martin Khodabakhshian	Ben Houser
Starsuckers	2009	Chris Atkins	Felicity Leabeater, Christina Slater
Startup.com	2001	Jehane Noujaim, Chris Hegedus	D.A. Pennebaker
Startup Kids, The	2012	Vala Halldorsdottir, Sesselja Vilhjalmsdottir	
State of Fear: The Truth about Terrorism	2005	Pamela Yates	Skylight Pictures
State of Marriage, The	2015	Jeff Kaufman	Jeff Kaufman, Marcia Ross
Station to Station	2014	Doug Aitken	Chris Totushek and Alex Waite
Stations of the Elevated	1981	Manfred Kirchheimer	Manfred Kirchheimer
Station 58	2008	Azfar Rizvi	Azfar Rizvi
Statue of Liberty, The	1985	Ken Burns	Ken Burns and Buddy Squires
Statues Also Die	1953	Alain Resnais, Chris Marker, Ghislain Cloquet	
Steal This Film†	2006	Jamie King	The League of Noble Peers
Steal This Story, Please!	2025	Carl Deal, Tia Lessin	Carl Deal, Tia Lessin, Karen Ranucci, Diana Cohn, Caren Spruch
Stealing Home: The Case of Contemporary Cuban Baseball	2001	Robert Anderson Clift, Salomé Aguilera Skvirsky	Robert Anderson Clift, Salomé Aguilera Skvirsky, M. Zach Richter
Step into Liquid	2003	Dana Brown	John-Paul Beeghly
Steve Jobs: The Lost Interview	2012	Paul Sen	Paul Sen, John Gau, Stephen Segaller
Steve Jobs: The Man in the Machine	2015	Alex Gibney	Viva Van Loock, Alex Gibney
Steve McQueen: The Man & Le Mans	2015	Gabriel Clarke, John McKenna	Gabriel Clarke, John McKenna
Stevie	2002	Steve James	Steve James
Stevie Van Zandt: Disciple	2024	Bill Teck	Bill Teck, David Fisher, Robert Cotto
Sticky: A (Self) Love Story	2016	Nicholas Tana	Nicholas Tana, Eric Wolfson, Denise Acosta
Still: A Michael J. Fox Movie	2023	Davis Guggenheim	Davis Guggenheim, Annetta Marion, Jonathan King, Will Cohen
Still Kicking: Six Artistic Women of Project Arts & Longevity	2006	Greg Young	Golden Bear Casting
Still We Believe: The Boston Red Sox Movie	2004	Paul Doyle Jr.	Daniel Carey, Peter Frechette, Michael Meyer, and Bob Potter
Stiller & Meara: Nothing Is Lost	2025	Ben Stiller	Ben Stiller, John Lesher, Geoffrey Richman, Lizz Morhaim
Stolen Kingdom	2025	Joshua Bailey	Joshua Bailey, Slater Wayne, Brandon Pickering, Colin Alexander, Sam Fraser, Jake Williams, Joshua Koopman, Sammie Astaneh
Stop the Insanity: Finding Susan Powter	2025	Zeberiah Newman	Jamie Lee Curtis, John Redmann, Celia Aniskovich, Chad Hines, Michiel Thomas
Stormy	2024	Sarah Gibson	Sarah Gibson, Erin Lee Carr, Emelia Brown
Stranded: I've Come from a Plane that Crashed on the Mountains	2007	Gonzalo Arijón	
Strange Journey: The Story of Rocky Horror	2025	Linus O'Brien	Linus O'Brien, Adam Gibbs, Garret Price, Avner Shiloah
Stranger with a Camera	2000	Elizabeth Barret	Elizabeth Barret, Judi Jennings
Strawberry Fields	2006	Ayelet Heller	Osnat Trabelsi
Street Dogs of South Central	2012	Bill Marin	Bill Marin, Vincent Ueber, Rene Duran
Street Fight	2005	Marshall Curry	Marshall Curry
Street Gang: How We Got to Sesame Street	2021	Marilyn Agrelo	Trevor Crafts, Lisa Diamond, Ellen Scherer Crafts, Mark Myers
Strength and Agility of Insects, The	1911	F. Percy Smith	
Strike: An Uncivil War	2024	Daniel Gordon	Daniel Gordon, Fjolla Iberhysaj, Nick Taussig
Stripped	2014	Dave Kellett, Frederick Schroeder	Dave Kellett, Frederick Schroeder, Chris Countryman
Stroop: Journey into the Rhino Horn War	2018	Susan Scott	Bonné de Bod, Susan Scott
Stolen Honor	2004	Carlton Sherwood	Carlton Sherwood
Stolen Kosovo	2008	Václav Dvořák	Alesz Bednarz
Stopping Traffic	2017	Sadhvi Siddhali Shree	Sadhvi Siddhali Shree, Siddhayatan Tirth
Stories We Tell	2012	Sarah Polley	Anita Lee, Silva Basmajian
Storm Foretold, A	2023	Christoffer Guldbrandsen	Peter Engel, Christoffer Guldbrandsen, Henrik Veileborg
Storm Was Coming, A	2020	Javier Fernández Vázquez	Javier Fernández Vázquez
Story of Children and Film, A	2013	Mark Cousins	
Story of Healing, A	1997	Donna Dewey	Donna Dewey and Carol Pasternak
Story of Stuff, The	2007	Louis Fox	Erica Priggen
The Story of the Vatican	1941	Jean Pages	Richard de Rochemont
Streetwise	1984	Martin Bell	Cheryl McCall
Strong Island	2017	Yance Ford	
Style Wars	1983	Tony Silver	Tony Silver, Henry Chalfant
Subconscious Art of Graffiti Removal, The	2001	Matt McCormick	Matt McCormick
Such Is Life: The Troubled Times of Ben Cousins	2010	Paul Goldman	Craig Griffin, Michael Gudinski
Sugar Babies, The	2007	Amy Serrano	
Sugar Film, That	2014	Damon Gameau	Nick Batzias, Damon Gameau, Rory Williamson
Sugarcane	2024	Julian Brave NoiseCat, Emily Kassie	Emily Kassie, Kellen Quinn
Suicide Killers	2006	Pierre Rehov	
Suing the Pope	2002		
Summer in the Cage, A	2007	Ben Selkow	Ben Selkow
Summer Tour	2025	Mischa Richter	Mickey Liddell, Pete Shilaimon, Chloë Sevigny, Evelina Kirgan, Lizzie Nastro
Sun Behind the Clouds, The	2010	Ritu Sarin, Tenzing Sonam	Ritu Sarin, Caroline Behar, Babeth M. VanLoo
Sun Dogs	2006	Andrea Stewart	
Sundown: The Future of Children and Drugs	1991	Shane Salerno	Shane Salerno
Sunrise Over Tiananmen Square	1998	Shui-Bo Wang	Don McWilliams
Sunset Strip	2012	Hans Fjellestad	Tommy Alastra
Super High Me	2007	Michael Blieden	Alex Campbell
Super Size Me	2004	Morgan Spurlock	Morgan Spurlock
Super Size Me 2: Holy Chicken!	2017	Morgan Spurlock	
Super Slim Me	2007	Lee Phillips	Lee Phillips
Super Speedway	1997	Stephen Low	Pietro L.Serapiglia
Superjews	2013	Nirit Peled	Tamara Vuurhuis, Valérie Schuit
Supermensch: The Legend of Shep Gordon	2013	Mike Myers	Beth Aala
Super/Man: The Christopher Reeve Story	2024	Ian Bonhôte, Peter Ettedgui	Robert Ford, Lizzie Gillett, Ian Bonhôte
Superpower	2023	Sean Penn, Aaron Kaufman	Sergei Bespalov, Danny Gabai, Billy Smith, Lauren Terp, Eric Weinrib
Surplus	2003	Erik Gandini	Erik Gandini
Surviving America's Most Hated Family	2019	Geoffrey O'Connor	Geoffrey O'Connor
Survivors Guide to Prison	2018	Matthew Cooke	
Swamp Dogg Gets His Pool Painted	2024	Isaac Gale, Ryan Olson, David McMurry	Isaac Gale, Paul Lovelace, David McMurry, Ryan Olson, Ben Wu
Swan Song	2023	Chelsea McMullan	Sean O'Neill
Sweatbox, The	2002	Trudie Styler, John-Paul Davidson	Trudie Styler, John-Paul Davidson
Sweden: Heaven and Hell	1968	Luigi Scattini	Mario Borghi
Sweet Crude	2008	Sandy Cioffi	Sandy Cioffi and Laurie Hicks
Sweetgrass	2009	Lucien Castaing-Taylor	Ilisa Barbash
Swim Lesson, A	2024	Rashida Jones, Will McCormack	Nicole Emanuele, Emily Arlook
Switchfootage	2003	Switchfoot, E.E. Kennedy	
Switchfootage 2	2006	Switchfoot, Andy Barron	

== T ==
† = Series

Title	Year	Director(s)	Producer(s)
T. Rex Autopsy	2015	Richard Dale	
Tab Hunter Confidential	2015	Jeffrey Schwarz	Allan Glaser, Neil Koenigsberg, and Jeffrey Schwarz
tabù n. 2, I	1965	Romolo Marcellini	
Tailenders, The	2005	Adele Horne	Adele Horne
Take Care of Maya	2023	Henry Roosevelt	
Take Me to Prom	2019	Andrew Moir	Andrew Moir
Takin' Place	2015	Cyrus Dowlatshahi	
Tale of the Wind, A	1998	Joris Ivens, Marceline Loridan	Marceline Loridan
Tale of the Wonderful Potato, The	1985	Anders Sørensen	
Tales of the Grim Sleeper	2014	Nick Broomfield	Nick Broomfield
Talhotblond	2009	Barbara Schroeder	Answers Productions
Talk to Me	2006	Mark Craig	Mark Craig
Tall: The American Skyscraper and Louis Sullivan	2006	Manfred Kirchheimer	Manfred Kirchheimer
Tall Man, The	2011	Tony Krawitz	Darren Dale
Tanjuska and the 7 Devils	1993	Pirjo Honkasalo	
Taq Kasra: Wonder of Architecture	2018	Pejman Akbarzadeh	
Tar Creek	2009	Matt Myers	Tanya Beer
Target for Tonight	1941	Harry Watt	Crown Film Unit
Tarnation	2003	Jonathan Caouette	Stephen Winter
Taste of China	2015	Huang Yinghao, Zhang Wei, Wang Bing, and Jin Ying	
Taubman Sucks	2004	Theo Lipfert	
Taxi to the Dark Side	2007	Alex Gibney	Alex Gibney, Susannah Shipman, and Eva Orner
Taylor Swift: The Eras Tour	2023	Sam Wrench	Taylor Swift
Techqua Ikachi, Land - My Life	1987	Anka Schmid, Agnes Barmettler, James Danaqyumptewa	
Television Event	2020	Jeff Daniels	Jeff Daniels, Ozzy Inguanzo, Amanda Spain
Tell No One	2019	Tomasz Sekielski	Marek Sekielski, Sekielski Brothers (company)
Teller and the Truth, The	2015	Andrew Shapter	
Temple Mount Is Mine, The	2003	Willy Lindwer	
Ten-Year Lunch, The	1987	Aviva Slesin	
Tender Fictions	1996	Barbara Hammer	
Terminal Bar	2003	Stefan Nadelman	
Terms and Conditions May Apply	2013	Cullen Hoback	Cullen Hoback, Nitin Khanna, John Ramos
Terra Incognita: The Perils and Promise of Stem Cell Research	2007	Maria Finitzo	Gordon Quinn, Justine Nagan
(T)error	2015	Lyric R. Cabral and David Felix Sutcliffe	Eugene Jarecki
Terror! Robespierre and the French Revolution	2009	Carl Hindmarch	Mark Hayhurst
Terror in the Aisles	1984	Andrew J. Kuehn	Andrew J. Kuehn, Stephen Netburn
Terror's Advocate	2007	Barbet Schroeder	Rita Dagher
Terrorists Among Us: Jihad in America	1994	Steven Emerson	Steven Emerson
Terry Pratchett: Choosing to Die	2011	Charlie Russell	Charlie Russell
Teta, Alf Marra	2010	Mahmoud Kaabour	
Thank You for Playing	2015	David Osit, Malika Zouhali-Worrall	David Osit, Malika Zouhali-Worrall
Thank You Very Much	2023	Alex Braverman	Lauren Belfer, Alex Braverman, Joe Plummer
Thariode	2020	Nirmal Baby Varghese	Baby Chaithanya
That Man: Peter Berlin	2005	Jim Tushinski	Lawrence Helman, Jim Tushinski
That Should Not Be: Our Children Will Accuse Us	2008	Jean-Paul Jaud	
That's Dancing!	1985	Jack Haley Jr.	Jack Haley Jr. and David Niven Jr.
That's Entertainment! †	1974	Jack Haley Jr.	Jack Haley Jr.
Theater of Life	2016	Peter Svatek	
There Is No Authority But Yourself	2006	Alexander Oey	Bruno Felix, Femke Wolting
There's No Place Like This Place, Anyplace	2020	Lulu Wei	Ali Weinstein
There's Something in the Water	2019	Elliot Page, Ian Daniel	Elliot Page, Ian Daniel, Julia Sanderson, Ingrid Waldron
These Amazing Shadows	2011	Paul Mariano, Kurt Norton	Christine O'Malley
These Streets are Watching		Jacob Crawford	Jacob Crawford
They Call Us Monsters	2016	Ben Lear	Ben Lear
They Came for Good: A History of the Jew in the US	1997	Amram Nowak	
They Killed Sister Dorothy	2008	Daniel Junge	Henry Ansbacher, Nigel Noble, Marcela Bourseau
They Shall Not Grow Old	2018	Peter Jackson	
They'll Love Me When I'm Dead	2018	Morgan Neville	Josh Karp, Morgan Neville, Korelan Matteson, Filip Jan Rymsza
They're Trying to Kill Us	2021	Keegan Kuhn, John Lewis	Keegan Kuhn, John Lewis
Thieves by Law	2010	Alexander Gentelev	Maya Zinshtein, Friederike Freier
Thin	2006	Lauren Greenfield	R. J. Cutler, Lauren Greenfield, Amanda Micheli, and Ted Skillman
Thin Blue Line, The	1966	William Friedkin	David L. Wolper
Thin Blue Line, The	1988	Errol Morris	Mark Lipson
Thinking Game, The	2024	Greg Kohs	Greg Kohs, Gary Krieg
Thinking XXX	2004	Timothy Greenfield-Sanders	Timothy Greenfield-Sanders
This Changes Everything	2015	Avi Lewis	Joslyn Barnes and Avi Lewis
This Divided State	2005	Steven Greenstreet	Phil Gordon, Steven Greenstreet, and Kristi Haycock
This Film Is Not Yet Rated	2006	Kirby Dick	Eddie Schmidt
This Is Elvis	1982	Malcolm Leo and Andrew Salt	Malcolm Leo and Andrew Salt
This Old Cub	2004	Jeff Santo	Joe Mantegna, Jeff Santo
Thomas Jefferson	1997	Ken Burns	Ken Burns, Camilla Rockwell
Thorn in the Heart, The	2009	Michel Gondry	Georges Bermann
Those Who Come, Will Hear (Ceux qui viendront, l'entendront)	2018	Simon Plouffe	Simon Plouffe
Thought Crimes: The Case of the Cannibal Cop	2015	Erin Lee Carr	Erin Lee Carr, Andrew Rossi
Thousand Cuts, A	2020	Ramona Diaz	Julie Goldman, Christopher Clements, Carolyn Hepburn, Ramona Diaz, Leah Marino
Three Identical Strangers	2018	Tim Wardle	Becky Read, Grace Hughes-Hallett
Three Sparks	2023	Naomi Uman	Naomi Uman
Thriller 40	2023	Nelson George	Colin Hanks, Sean M. Stuart
Through a Blue Lens	1999	Veronica Alice Mannix	Gillian Darling-Kovanic
Tibet: Cry of the Snow Lion	2002	Tom Peosay	
Tiger Next Door, The	2009	Camilla Calamandrei	Camilla Calamandrei
Tillman Story, The	2010	Amir Bar-Lev	
Timbrels and Torahs	2000	Judith Montell, Miriam Chaya	Judith Montell, Miriam Chaya
Time	2020	Garrett Bradley	Garrett Bradley, Kellen Quinn, Lauren Domino
Time and Water	2026	Sara Dosa	Jameka Autry, Shane Boris, Sara Dosa, Elijah Stevens
Time Bombs	2008	Guylaine Maroist and Éric Ruel	Guylaine Maroist and Éric Ruel
Time for Burning, A	1966	William C. Jersey	William C. Jersey
Time Indefinite	1993	Ross McElwee	
Time Machine: The Journey Back	1993	Clyde Lucas	Clyde Lucas
Times of Harvey Milk, The	1984	Rob Epstein	Richard Schmiechen and Rob Epstein
Timestamp	2025	Kateryna Gornostai	Olha Beskhmelnytsina, Nataliia Libet, and Viktor Shevchenko
Tina	2021	Dan Lindsay and T. J. Martin	Diane Becker, Jonathan Chinn, Simon Chinn
Tintin and I	2003		
Titan, The: Story of Michelangelo	1950	Robert J. Flaherty, Richard Lyford, Curt Oertel	Ralph Alswang
Titan: The OceanGate Disaster	2025	Mark Monroe	Mark Monroe, Lily Garrison, Jon Bardin
Titanic: The Complete Story	1994	Edith Beckler and Melissa Peltier	A&E Television Networks
Titanoboa: Monster Snake	2012	Martin Kemp	
Titicut Follies	1967	Frederick Wiseman	Frederick Wiseman
Tito, Margot & Me	2022	Mercedes Arias, Delfina Vidal	Luis Pacheco
To Shoot an Elephant	2009	Alberto Arce, Mohammad Rujailahk	
To Be and to Have	2002	Nicolas Philibert	Gilles Sandoz
To Be Takei	2014	Jennifer M. Kroot	Jennifer M. Kroot, Mayuran Tiruchelvam, Gerry Kim
To the End	2022	Rachel Lears	Sabrina Schmidt Gordon
To the End	2024	Toby L.	Josh Connolly
To Touch the Soul	2007	Ryan Goble	Teresa Hagen
Tokiori – Dobras do Tempo	2013	Paulo Pastorelo	Matias Mariani, Paulo Pastorelo
Tomorrow's Another Day	2011	Johan Carlsson	
Too Soon: Comedy After 9/11	2021	Nick Scown, Julie Seabaugh	Tammy Chu, Ben Heins, Scott Recchia, Benjamin Stephen
ToryBoy The Movie	2011	John Walsh	John Walsh
Totally Under Control	2020	Alex Gibney, Ophelia Harutyunyan, Suzanne Hillinger	Alex Gibney, Ophelia Harutyunyan, Suzanne Hillinger
Touching the Void	2003	Kevin Macdonald	John Smithson
Tough Guys	2017	Henry Roosevelt, W.B. Zullo	Craig DiBiase
Tower	2016	Keith Maitland	Keith Maitland, Susan Thomson, Megan Gilbride
Tower That Built a City, The	2026	Mark Myers	Mark Myers, Luke Myers
The Toxic Clouds of 9/11: A Looming Disaster	2006		Alison Johnson
Toxic Legacy	2006		Susan Teskey
TPB AFK: The Pirate Bay Away From Keyboard	2013	Simon Klose	Martin Persson, Simon Klose, Signe Byrge Sørenssen, Anne Köhncke
Traceroute	2016	Johannes Grenzfurthner	Johannes Grenzfurthner, Andreas Reisenbauer, Heather Kelley, Guenther Friesinger
Traces of Death †	1993		
Track, The	2025	Ryan Sidhoo	Ryan Sidhoo
Traduire	2011	Nurith Aviv	Serge Lalou
Traffic Stop	2017	Kate Davis, David Heilbroner	
Transcendent Man	2009	Barry Ptolemy	Barry Ptolemy, Felicia Ptolemy
Transparent	2005	Jules Rosskam	Jules Rosskam
Travis Barker: Louder Than Fear	2026	Justin Krook, Michael Dwyer	Matthew Weaver, Nick Stern
Tree That Remembers, The	2002	Masoud Raouf	Mark Goodwin and Eric Lemoyne
Trembling Before G-d	2001	Sandi Simcha DuBowski	Sandi Simcha DuBowski and Marc Smolowitz
Trente tableaux	2011	Paule Baillargeon	
Trial in Prague, A	2000	Zuzana Justman	Zuzana Justman, Jiri Jezek, Zuzana Cervenkova, David Charap
Trials of Henry Kissinger, The	2002	Eugene Jarecki	Alex Gibney and Eugene Jarecki
Trials of Ted Haggard, The	2009	Alexandra Pelosi	
Trinidad	2008	Jay Hodges, PJ Raval	Matt Dentler
Trip to Unicorn Island, A	2016	Scott Winn	Andrew Mecham
Trixie Mattel: Moving Parts	2019	Nick Zeig-Owens	David Silver
Triumph of the Nerds	1996	Paul Sen	John Gau, Stephen Segaller
Triumph of the Will	1935	Leni Riefenstahl	Leni Riefenstahl
Troop 1500	2005	Ellen Spiro	Karen Bernstein
Troublesome Creek: A Midwestern	1995	Jeanne Jordan and Steven Ascher	Rick Groleau and Jeanne Jordan
True Cost, The	2015	Andrew Morgan	Michael Ross
True Glory, The	1945	Garson Kanin and Carol Reed	Office of War Information and Ministry of Information
True North	2025	Michèle Stephenson	Leslie Norville
True Story of Frank Zappa's 200 Motels, The	1988	Frank Zappa	Jill Silverthorn
Truman	1997	David Grubin	Allyson Luchak, David Grubin
Truffle Hunters, The	2020	Michael Dweck, Gregory Kershaw	Michael Dweck, Gregory Kershaw
Trump: The Kremlin Candidate?	2017	Matthew Hill, Tomiko Newson, Nick Sturdee	Andy Blackman, Matthew Hill, Tomiko Newson, Nick Sturdee
Trump: What's the Deal?	1991		Al Levin, Libby Handros
Trumped: Inside the Greatest Political Upset of All Time	2017	Ted Bourne, Mary Robertson, Banks Tarver	Kevin Vargas
Truth About Size Zero, The	2007	Karen Plumb	Jo Shinner, Karen Plumb
Truth According to Wikipedia, The	2008	IJsbrand van Veelen (director), Marijntje Denters, Martijn Kieft (segment directors)	Judith van den Berg
Truth Be Told	2012	Gregorio Smith	Gregorio Smith, Mark Mahler
Truth in 24	2008	Keith Cossrow, Bennett Viseltear	Alan Brown, Matt Goldfine, Chuck Johnsen
Truth in 24 II: Every Second Counts	2012	Rob Gehring	Charles N. Besser, Howard Katz, Steve Sabol
Truth in Numbers? Everything, According to Wikipedia	2010	Scott Glosserman, Nic Hill	Michael Ferris Gibson, Scott Glosserman, Nic Hill
Truth vs. Alex Jones, The	2024	Dan Reed	Dan Reed, Marguerite Gaudin
Try Harder!	2021	Debbie Lum	Debbie Lum, Lou Nakasako, Nico Opper
Tulip Time: The Rise and Fall of the Trio Lescano	2008	Tonino Boniotti, Marco De Stefanis	Sherman De Jesus, Cécile van Eijk
Tulku	2009	Gesar Mukpo	Kent Martin
Tuna Wranglers	2007		
Tunisian Victory	1944	Frank Capra, Hugh Stewart, and John Huston	British Service Units and U.S. Army Signal Corps
Tupac: Assassination	2007	Richard Bond	Frank Alexander and Richard Bond
Tupac: Resurrection	2003	Lauren Lazin	Karolyn Ali, Preston L. Holmes, and Lauren Lazin
Twenty Years Later	1984	Eduardo Coutinho	Eduardo Coutinho, Zelito Viana
Twin Towers	2002	Bill Guttentag, Robert David Port	
Twist of Faith	2005	Kirby Dick	Eddie Schmidt
Twister, The: Caught in the Storm	2025	Alexandra Lacey	Tim King, Robin Le Chanu
Two Faces of War, The	2007	Diana Andringa, Flora Gomes	
Tyson	2008	James Toback	Damon Bingham, James Toback, Mike Tyson, and Harlan Werner

== U ==
† = Series

Title	Year	Director(s)	Producer(s)
U2 3D	2007	Catherine Owens and Mark Pellington	Jon Shapiro, Peter Shapiro, John Modell, and Catherine Owens
U2: Rattle and Hum	1988	Phil Joanou	Michael Hamlyn
Über Goober: A Film about Gamers	2004	Steve Metze	Steve Metze
Udstillede, De	2000	Jesper Jargil	Helle Ulsteen, Vinca Wiedemann
UFOs: Seeing Is Believing	2005	Mark Obenhaus	Jordan Kronick, Gabrielle Tenenbaum
Ultime grida dalla savana	1975	Antonio Climati, Mario Morra	Antonio Climati, Mario Morra
Ulysses S. Grant	2002	Adriana Bosch, Elizabeth Deane	Adriana Bosch, Elizabeth Deane
Umbrella	2007	Du Haibin	Ben Tsiang, Du Haibin, and Hsu Hsiao-Ming
Umurage	2002	Gorka Gamarra	Icarukuri
Un viaje con Fidel	2015	Eduardo Suárez	
Unacceptable Levels	2013	Edward Brown	
Unbearable Being of Lightness, The	2016	Ramchandra P. N.	Ramchandra P. N., Sudipto Mondal
Unbranded	2015	Phillip Baribeau	Dennis Aig, Phillip Baribeau, and Ben Masters
Unbroken Glass	2016	Dinesh Das Sabu	Dinesh Das Sabu, R. Patrick Lile
Unchained Memories	2003	Ed Bell, Thomas Lennon	
Uncovered: The War on Iraq	2004	Robert Greenwald	Philippe Diaz, Robert Greenwald, Kathryn McArdle, and Devin Smith
Uncropped	2023	D.W. Young	D.W. Young, Judith Mizrachy
Undefeated	2011	Daniel Lindsay and T.J. Martin	Rich Middlemas, Daniel Lindsay, and Seth Gordon
Undefeated, The	2011	Stephen K. Bannon	Glenn Bracken Evans, Dan Fleuette
Under Our Skin: The Untold Story of Lyme Disease	2008	Andy Abrahams Wilson	Andrew Abrahams
Under the Volcano	2021	Gracie Otto	Cody Greenwood
Undercover Mosque	2007	Andrew Smith	
Undercover Mosque: The Return	2008	Andrew Smith	
Underplayed	2020	Stacey Lee	William Crouse
Underground Eiger, The	1979	Barry Cockcroft	John Fairley
Unfair Dealing	2008		David Weingarten
Unfinished Spaces	2011	Alysa Nahmias, Benjamin Murray	Alysa Nahmias, Benjamin Murray
Unfinished Symphony: Democracy and Dissent	2001	Bestor Cram and Mike Majoros	Bestor Cram
Unfolding Florence: The Many Lives of Florence Broadhurst	2006	Gillian Armstrong	Sue Clothier, Charles Hannah
Union	2024	Brett Story, Stephen Maing	Samantha Curley, Mars Verrone
Union in Wait, A	2001	Ryan Butler	Ryan Butler
Union, The: The Business Behind Getting High	2007	Brett Harvey	Graeme Flannigan, Stephen Green, Adam Scorgie
United States of Insanity, The	2021	Tom Putnam, Brenna Sanchez	Tom Putnam, Brenna Sanchez
Unity	2015	Shaun Monson	Melissa Danis, Shaun Monson
Universal Language, The	2011	Sam Green	
Unknown Known, The	2013	Errol Morris	Amanda Branson Gill, Robert Fernandez, Errol Morris
Unlawful Killing	2011	Keith Allen	
Unlocking the Cage	2016	Chris Hegedus, D.A. Pennebaker	
Unlocking the Mystery of Life	2003	Lad Allen, Timothy Eaton	Lad Allen, Timothy Eaton
Unmistaken Child	2008	Nati Baratz	
Unnecessary Fuss	1984		Ingrid Newkirk, Alex Pacheco
Unraveled	2011	Marc H. Simon	
Unreasonable Man, An	2006	Henriette Mantel, Steve Skrovan	Kevin O'Donnell
Unrivaled: Earnhardt vs. Gordon	2019	Michael Hughes	Dave Bragg, Sol Horner, Jon Housholder, Jeff Schafer, Mike Thompson, Griffin Van Malssen
Unstoppable	2013	Darren Doane	John Bona, Marshall Foster
Untamed Romania	2018	Tom Barton-Humphreys	Alex Păun, Allison Bean, Ellen Windemuth, Ionuț Ardeleanu, Paul Lister
Until the Light Takes Us	2008	Aaron Aites, Audrey Ewell	Aaron Aites, Audrey Ewell
Untold: Deal with the Devil	2021	Laura Brownson	Chapman Way, Maclain Way, Jake Graham-Felsen, Talin Parseghian Middleton
Untold: Jake Paul the Problem Child	2023	Andrew Renzi	Chapman Way, Maclain Way, Howard Owens, Ben Silverman, Isabel San Vargas
Untouchable	2019	Ursula Macfarlane	Jonathan Chinn, Simon Chinn, Poppy Dixon
Up for Grabs	2004	Michael Wranovics	Michael Wranovics
Up †	1964–2026	Paul Almond, Michael Apted, Asif Kapadia	Granada Television, Tim Hewat, Michael Apted, Margaret Bottomley, Claire Lewis
Up the Ridge	2006	Nick Szuberla, Amelia Kirby	
Us Now	2009	Ivo Gormley	Hugh Hartford
USA vs. Al-Arian	2007	Line Halvorsen	Jan Dalchow

== V ==
† = Series

Title	Year	Director(s)	Producer(s)
V-Day: Until the Violence Stops	2003	Abby Epstein	Vincent Farrell
Val	2021	Leo Scott, Ting Poo	Val Kilmer, Leo Scott, Ting Poo, Andrew Fried, Dane Lillegard, Jordan Wynn, Ali Alborzi, Brad Koepenick, Tom Stratton
Valentino: The Last Emperor	2008	Matt Tyrnauer	Matt Kapp, Matt Tyrnauer
Valley of the T. rex	2001		
Vampire Secrets	2006	Diana Zaslaw	Diana Zaslaw
Vanishing of the Bees	2009	George Langworthy, Maryam Henein	George Langworthy, Maryam Henein
Vanishing Prairie, The	1954	James Algar	Ben Sharpsteen
Vaxxed: From Cover-Up to Catastrophe	2016	Andrew Wakefield	Del Bigtree
Vegucated	2011	Marisa Miller Wolfson	Marisa Miller Wolfson
Velvet Underground, The	2021	Todd Haynes	Todd Haynes, Christine Vachon, Julie Goldman, Carolyn Hepburn, Christopher Clements, David Blackman
Vernon, Florida	1981	Errol Morris	Errol Morris
Very Semi-Serious	2015	Leah Wolchok	Leah Wolchok and Davina Pardo
Veselka: The Rainbow on the Corner at the Center of the World	2024	Michael Fiore	Michael Fiore
Victory Through Air Power	1943	Perce Pearce	Walt Disney
Video Fool for Love	1996	Robert Gibson	George Miller, Doug Mitchell
Video Games: The Movie	2014	Jeremy Snead	Jeremy Snead, Cliff Bleszinski
Video Nasties: Moral Panic, Censorship & Videotape	2010	Jake West	Marc Morris
Videocracy	2009	Erik Gandini	Erik Gandini, Mikael Olsen
Videoheaven	2025	Alex Ross Perry	Andrew Adair, Daniel Herbert, Jake Perlin, Alex Ross Perry
Viewing Booth, The	2019	Ra'anan Alexandrowicz	Ra'anan Alexandrowicz, Liran Atzmor
Vigilante Vigilante: The Battle for Expression	2011	Max Good	Max Good, Nathan Wollman
Viktor	2024	Olivier Sarbil	Olivier Sarbil, Darren Aronofsky, Dylan Golden, Sigrid Dyekjær, Philippe Levasseuer, Brendan Naylor
Vinyl	2000	Alan Zweig	Greg Klymkiw
Virginia Creepers: The Horror Host Tradition of the Old Dominion	2009	Sean Kotz, Christopher Valluzzo	Sean Kotz
Virtual JFK: Vietnam if Kennedy Had Lived	2008	Koji Masutani	
Virunga	2014	Orlando von Einsiedel	Orlando von Einsiedel, Joanna Natasegara
Vision of Paolo Soleri, The: Prophet in the Desert	2013	Lisa Scafuro	Lisa Scafuro
Voices of Bam	2006	People of Iraq (Martin Kunert uncredited)	Eric Manes
Voices of Iraq	2004	People of Iraq (Martin Kunert uncredited)	Eric Manes
Voices of the Children	1999	Zuzana Justman	
Voices of Transition	2012	Nils Aguilar	Milpa Films
Volcanic Sprint	2007	Steve Dorst	Dan Evans and Steve Dorst
Voyage in Time	1983	Tonino Guerra, Andrei Tarkovsky	Tonino Guerra, Andrei Tarkovsky
Voyage that Shook the World, The	2009	Steve Murray	Ben Suter, Carl Wieland

== W ==
† = Series

Title	Year	Director(s)	Producer(s)
Waco, the Big Lie	1993	Linda Thompson	
Wadd: The Life & Times of John C. Holmes	1998	Cass Paley	Cass Paley
Wagner's Dream	2012	Susan Froemke	Susan Froemke, Douglas Graves
Waiting for Fidel	1974	Michael Rubbo	Tom Daly, Michael Rubbo
Wal-Mart: The High Cost of Low Price	2005	Robert Greenwald	Jim Gilliam
Walden	1968	Jonas Mekas	Jonas Mekas
Walk Away Renee	2011	Jonathan Caouette	Jonathan Caouette, Gérard Lacroix, Pierre-Paul Puljiz
Walking with...: Dinosaurs, Beasts, Caveman, Monsters †	1999–2005	Nigel Paterson and Andrew Wilks	Chloe Leland, Tim Haines, and Jasper James
Walrus and the Whistleblower, The	2020	Nathalie Bibeau	Nathalie Bibeau, Frederic Bohbot
Walt Disney	2015	Sarah Colt	Sarah Colt
Wanderlust	2006	Shari Springer Berman, Robert Pulcini	Shari Springer Berman, Robert Pulcini
Wanted 18, The	2014	Amer Shomali, Paul Cowan	Saed Andoni, Ina Fichman, Dominique Barneaud, Nathalie Cloutier
War/Dance	2007	Sean Fine and Andrea Nix Fine	Albie Hecht
War at Home, The	1979	Glenn Silber	Barry Alexander Brown and Glenn Silber
War Game	2024	Jesse Moss, Tony Gerber	Todd Lubin, Jesse Moss, Jack Turner, Mark DiCristofaro, Jessica Grimshaw, Nick Shumaker
War, Love, God, & Madness	2008	Mohamed Al-Daradji	
War of the Volcanoes, The	2012	Francesco Patierno	
War Paint – Women at War	2025	Margy Kinmonth	Margy Kinmonth
War Photographer	2001	Christian Frei	
War You Don't See, The	2010	Alan Lowery, John Pilger	Alan Lowery, John Pilger
Warrendale	1967	Allan King	Allan King
Waseskun	2016	Steve Patry	Nathalie Cloutier, Denis McCready
Waste Land	2010	Lucy Walker, João Jardim, and Karen Harley	
Watch Horror Films, Keep America Strong!	2008	Tom Wyrsch	Tom Wyrsch
Water	2006	Anastaysia Popova	Saida Medvedeva, Vasily Anisimov, Sergey Shumakov
Watermarks	2004	Yaron Zilberman	Yonatan Israel, Yaron Zilberman
Watson	2019	Lesley Chilcott	Lesley Chilcott, Louise Runge, Wolfgang Knöpfler
We Are Dad	2005	Michel Horvat	
We Are Guardians	2023	Chelsea Greene, Rob Grobman, Edivan Guajajara	Maura Anderson, Zak Kilberg, Fisher Stevens
We Are Legion	2012	Brian Knappenberger	Luminant Media
We Are the Fruits of the Forest	2025	Rithy Panh	Catherine Dussart
We Are Storror	2025	Michael Bay	Michael Bay, Terry Dougas, Paris Kassidokostas-Latsis, Drew Taylor, Angus Wall
We Believe: Chicago and Its Cubs	2009	John Scheinfeld	
We Come as Friends	2014	Hubert Sauper	
We Do	2015	Rebecca Rice	Rebecca Rice
We Feed the World	2005	Erwin Wagenhofer	Katharina Bogensberger, Helmut Grasser
We Live in Public	2009	Ondi Timoner	Ondi Timoner, Keirda Bahruth
We Steal Secrets: The Story of WikiLeaks	2013	Alex Gibney	Alex Gibney, Marc Shmuger, Alexis Bloom
We Were So Beloved	1985	Manfred Kirchheimer	Manfred Kirchheimer
Web	2013	Michael Kleiman	
Web Junkie	2013	Hilla Medalia, Shosh Shlam	Hilla Medalia, Shosh Shlam, Neta Zwebner-Zaibert
Weekend of a Champion	1972	Frank Simon, Roman Polanski	Roman Polanski
Welcome to Chechnya	2020	David France	David France, Alice Henty, Askold Kurov, Joy A. Tomchin
Welcome to Durham, USA	2007	Christopher Martin	
Welcome to Leith	2015	Michael Beach Nichols and Christopher K. Walker	
Welcome to Macintosh	2008	Robert Baca, Josh Rizzo	Baca Productions
Welcome to Nollywood	2007	Jamie Meltzer	Michael Cayce Lindner
Werner Herzog Eats His Shoe	1980	Les Blank	
West of Memphis	2012	Amy J. Berg	Amy Berg, Fran Walsh, Peter Jackson, Damien Echols, Lorri Davis
WeWork: Or the Making and Breaking of a $47 Billion Unicorn	2021	Jed Rothstein	Ross M. Dinerstein
Whale, The	2011	Suzanne Chisholm, Michael Parfit	Suzanne Chisholm
Wham!	2023	Chris Smith	John Battsek, Chris Smith, Simon Halfon, Alex Black
Wham! 10 Days in China	2026	Mike Christie	Alice Popplewell
Wham! Bam! Islam!	2011	Isaac Solotaroff	Jen Kaczor, Mohammed Madi, Katharyn Bond Marquez
Wham! in China: Foreign Skies	1986	Lindsay Anderson	Jazz Summers and Simon Napier-Bell
What Happened on September 11	2020	Amy Schatz	Amy Schatz
What Happened, Miss Simone?	2015	Liz Garbus	Liz Garbus, Amy Hobby, Jayson Jackson, Justin Wilkes
What Is a Woman?	2022	Justin Folk	Justin Folk, Dallas Sonnier, Charlotte Roland
What Remains of Us	2004	Hugo Latulippe and François Prévost	Yves Bisaillon and François Prévost
What She Said: The Art of Pauline Kael	2018	Rob Garver	Rob Garver and Glen Zipper
What the #$*! Do We Know!?	2004	William Arntz, Betsy Chasse, Mark Vicente	William Arntz, Betsy Chasse, Mark Vicente
What the Fields Remember		Subasri Krishnan	
What the Health	2017	Kip Andersen, Keegan Kuhn	Kip Andersen, Keegan Kuhn
What Would Jesus Buy?	2007	Rob VanAlkemade	Peter Hutchison, Stacey Offman, and Morgan Spurlock
What Would Sophia Loren Do?	2021	Ross Kauffman	Robin Honan, Nicole Galovski
Wheel of Time	2003	Werner Herzog	Werner Herzog Filmproduktion
When Dinosaurs Roamed America	2001	Pierre de Lespinois	John Copeland
When Giants Collide	2007	Christina Fulton	Christina Fulton
When I Came Home	2006	Dan Lohaus	Lohaus Films
When I Walk	2013	Jason DaSilva	Jason DaSilva, Alice Cook, Leigh DaSilva
When Jews Were Funny	2013	Alan Zweig	Jeff Glickman, Jesse D. Ikeman
When Life Departs	1997	Stefan Fjeldmark, Karsten Kiilerich	
When the Levees Broke: A Requiem in Four Acts	2006	Spike Lee	Spike Lee and Samuel D. Pollard
When the Moors Ruled in Europe	2005	Timothy Copestake	
When the World was Wide	1978	Perry Miller Adato	Perry Miller Adato
When We Were Kings	1996	Leon Gast	David Sonenberg, Leon Gast, and Taylor Hackford
Where Have All the Flowers Gone?	2008	Arturo Perez Jr.	Arturo Perez Jr., Joel Sadler, and Billy Troy
Where I'm From	2014	Claude Demers	
Where in the World is Osama Bin Laden?	2008	Morgan Spurlock	Non Linear Films
Where's My Roy Cohn?	2019	Matt Tyrnauer	
While the Green Grass Grows: A Diary in Seven Parts	2025	Peter Mettler	Peter Mettler, Brigitte Hofer, Cornelia Seitler
Whistling Smith	1975	Marrin Canell, Michael J. F. Scott	Barrie Howells, Ian McLaren, Michael J. F. Scott
White Diamond, The	2004	Werner Herzog	Marco Polo Film AG
White: A Season in the Life of John Borden Evans	2014	Eduardo Montes-Bradley	Heritage Film Project
White Light/Black Rain: The Destruction of Hiroshima and Nagasaki	2007	Steven Okazaki	Steven Okazaki
Whitey: United States of America v. James J. Bulger	2014	Joe Berlinger	Joe Berlinger, Caroline Suh
Whitney	2018	Kevin Macdonald	Simon Chinn, Jonathan Chinn, Lisa Erspamer
Who Are the DeBolts? And Where Did They Get Nineteen Kids?	1977	John Korty	John Korty
Who I Am Not	2023	Tunde Skovran	Andrei Zinca
Who Killed Dr Bogle and Mrs Chandler?	2006	Peter Butt	Peter Butt, Kris Wyld
Who Killed Lt. Van Dorn?	2018	Zachary Stauffer	
Who Killed Nancy?	2009	Alan Parker	Ben Timlett, Christine Alderson
Who Killed the Electric Car?	2006	Chris Paine	Jessie Deeter
Who Killed the Montreal Expos?	2025	Jean-François Poisson	Stéphanie Thibault
Who Loves the Sun	2024	Arshia Shakiba	Zaynê Akyol, Arshia Shakiba
Whore Like Me, A	2019	Sharon Yaish and Yael Shachar	Daroma Productions
Whose Streets?	2017	Sabaah Folayan, Damon Davis	Sabaah Folayan, Damon Davis, Sabaah Jordan, Jennifer MacArthur, Flannery Miller, Chris Renteria
Why Beauty Matters	2009	Louise Lockwood	Andrew Lockyer
Why Horror?	2014	Nicolas Kleiman, Rob Lindsay	Nicolas Kleiman, Rob Lindsay
Why Is Yellow the Middle of the Rainbow?	1994	Kidlat Tahimik	
Why Wal-Mart Works; and Why That Drives Some People C-R-A-Z-Y	2005	Ron Galloway	Ron Galloway
Why We Bang	2006	Clifford Jordan	Orlando Myrics, Cecil Holmes
Why We Fight	2005	Eugene Jarecki	Susannah Shipman
Wick Is Pain	2025	Jeffrey Doe	Josh Oreck, Gabriel Roth, Matthew Sidle
Wiebo's War	2011	David York	David York, Bryn Hughes, Nick Hector, Bonnie Thompson
Wiener Takes All: A Dogumentary	2007	Shane MacDougall	Marion Law, Shane MacDougall
Wig	2019	Chris Moukarbel	Chris Moukarbel, Jack Turner, Bruce Cohen, David Burtka, Neil Patrick Harris, Jason Weinberg, Jay Peterson, Michael Mayer, Todd Lubin
Wigstock: The Movie	1995	Barry Shils	Dean Silvers, Marlen Hecht
Wild and Wonderful Whites of West Virginia, The	2009	Julien Nitzberg	Katie Doering, Julien Nitzberg, Storm Taylor
Wild Bunch: An Album in Montage, The	1996	Paul Seydor	Nick Redman, Paul Seydor
Wild Inside	2026	Penny Lane	Gabriel Sedgwick, Nickolas Hasse
Wild Man Blues	1998	Barbara Kopple	Jean Doumanian
Wild Parrots of Telegraph Hill, The	2011	Judy Irving	Judy Irving
Wild Sky	2011	Rachid B.	Sylvie Randonneix
Wild Wild Space	2024	Ross Kauffman	Jaye Callahan, Ashlee Vance, Adam McKay, Todd Schulman, Justin Falvey, Darryl Frank, Christopher Collins, Lydia Tenaglia, Craig H. Shepherd
Wild, Wild World of Jayne Mansfield, The	1968	Charles W. Broun, Jr., Joel Holt, Arthur Knight	Dick Randall
Wildest Show in the South, The: The Angola Prison Rodeo	1999	Simeon Soffer	Peter Ginsburg, Simeon Soffer, Jonathan Stack
Will & Harper	2024	Josh Greenbaum	Jessica Elbaum, Will Ferrell, Josh Greenbaum, Christopher Leggett, Rafael Marmor
William Shatner's Gonzo Ballet	2009	Pat Buckley	Chris Carley, David Zappone, Michael Manasseri
William Shatner: You Can Call Me Bill	2023	Alexandre O. Philippe	Jeff Annison, Kerry Deignan Roy, Bryan Talebi
Williams	2017	Morgan Matthews	Hayley Reynolds, Sarah Hamilton
Winnebago Man	2009	Ben Steinbauer	Joel Heller, Malcolm Pullinger, Ben Steinbauer
Witch Hunt	2019	Jon Pullman	
Witness, The	2020	Jenny Stein	James LaVeck
With One Voice	2009	Eric Temple	
Wine for the Confused	2004	David Kennard	Victoria Simpson
Wings of Defeat	2007	Risa Morimoto	Linda Hoaglund, Risa Morimoto
Wings of Hope	1998	Werner Herzog	Lucki Stipetic
Winning: The Racing Life of Paul Newman	2015	Adam Carolla, Nate Adams	Adam Carolla, Nate Adams, Matt D'Andria
Winter Soldier	1972	the Winterfilm Collective	Vietnam Veterans Against the War and the Winterfilm Collective
With My Heart in Yambo	2011	María Fernanda Restrepo	
Without the King	2007	Michael Skolnik	Michael Skolnik
Winged Migration	2001	Jacques Perrin	Christophe Barratier and Jacques Perrin
Wolfgang	2021	David Gelb	David Gelb, Jason Sterman, Brian McGinn
Wolfman's Got Nards	2018	Andre Gower	Andre Gower
Woman Like Me, A	2015	Elizabeth Giamatti, Alex Sichel	Elizabeth Giamatti, Alex Sichel, Christine Vachon
Women of Faith	2009	Rebecca M. Alvin	
Women of the Gulag	2018	Marianna Yarovskaya	Marianna Yarovskaya and Paul Roderick Gregory
Women of the World	1963	Gualtiero Jacopetti, Paolo Cavara, Franco Prosperi	Gualtiero Jacopetti, Paolo Cavara, Franco Prosperi
Won't You Be My Neighbor?	2018	Morgan Neville	Morgan Neville, Caryn Capotosto, Nicholas Ma
Wonders of the Sea 3D	2017	Jean-Michel Cousteau, Jean-Jacques Mantello	François Mantello, Arnold Schwarzenegger
Woodstock	1970	Michael Wadleigh	Bob Maurice
Woodstock 99: Peace, Love, and Rage	2021	Garret Price	Adam Gibbs, Sean Keegan
Word of the Righteous†	2017	Svitlana Levitas, Margarita Yakovleva	Svitlana Levitas, Margarita Yakovleva
Word Wars	2004	Eric Chaikin, Julian Petrillo	Eric Chaikin
Wordplay	2006	Patrick Creadon	Christine O'Malley
Work, The	2017	Jairus McLeary	Alice Henty, Eon McLeary, Jairus McLeary, Miles McLeary, Angela Sostre
Workhorse Queen	2021	Angela Washko	
World According to Monsanto, The	2008	Marie-Monique Robin	Marie-Monique Robin
World According to Bush, The	2004	William Karel	Jean-François Lepetit, Agnès Vicariot
World Before Her, The	2012	Nisha Pahuja	Ed Barreveld, Nisha Pahuja, Mike Chamberlain, Andy Cohen, Cornelia Principe
World of Plenty	1943	Paul Rotha	Yvonne Fletcher
World of Charlie Company, The	1970	John Laurence	Russ Bensley
World's Best Prom, The	2006	Ari Vena and Chris Talbott	Ian Rosenberg and Chris Talbott
Wrangler: Anatomy of an Icon	2008	Jeffrey Schwarz	Jeffrey Schwarz, Sonja Nelson
Wrath of Gods	2007	Jon Gustafsson	Jon Einarsson Gustafsson and Karolina Lewicka
Wrinkles the Clown	2019	Michael Beach Nichols	Jennie Bedusa, Mike Dill, Jon Lullo, Lowell Shapiro, Brendan Walter
Write down, I Am an Arab	2014	Ibtisam Mara'ana	Ibtisam Mara'ana
WTO/99	2025	Ian Bell	Ian Bell, Alex Megaro, Laura Tatham
Woubi Chéri	1998	Laurent Bocahut and Philip Brooks	Philip Brooks and Laurent Bocahut

== X ==
† = Series

Title	Year	Director(s)	Producer(s)
X-Rated Ambition: The Traci Lords Story	2003	Simon Kerslake	Helen Booth, Simon Kerslake
X-Ray of a Lie	2004	Wolfgang Schalk	El Gusano de Luz
Xennials	2021	Paula Chávez	
XTC: This Is Pop	2017	Charlie Thomas, Roger Penny	Colin Burrows, Barbara Lee, Andrew Winter
XXXY	2000	Porter Gale, Laleh Soomekh	

== Y ==
† = Series

Title	Year	Director(s)	Producer(s)
Year and a Half in the Life of Metallica, A	1992	Adam Dubin	Juliana Roberts
Year at Danger	2007	Steve Metze and Don Swaynos	Steve Metze
Year Earth Changed, The	2021	Tom Beard	Mike Gunton, Alice Keens-Soper
Year of Sir Ivor, The	1969	Kit Owens	
Yellow Face	2010	Han Tang	Han Tang
Yellow Star, The: The Persecution of the Jews in Europe 1933–45	1980	Dieter Hildebrandt	Bengt von zur Mühlen, Arthur Cohn
Yes Men, The	2003	Dan Ollman, Sarah Price, Chris Smith	Sarah Price, Doug Ruschhaupt, Randy Russell, Chris Smith
Yes Men Fix the World, The	2009	Jacques Servin, Igor Vamos, Kurt Engfehr	Doro Bachrach, Patrice Barrat, Ruth Charny, Alan Hayling, Laura Nix, Jess Search, Amy Sommer, Juliette Timsit
Yes Men Are Revolting, The	2014	Laura Nix, Jacques Servin, Igor Vamos	Laura Nix, Jacques Servin, Igor Vamos
Yes, We Fuck!	2015	Antonio Centeno and Raúl de la Morena	
Yiddish World Remembered, A	2002	Andrew Goldberg	
Yoo-Hoo, Mrs. Goldberg	2009	Aviva Kempner	Aviva Kempner
You Are Here	2018	Moze Mossanen	Peter Gentile
You Cannot Kill David Arquette	2020	David Darg, Price James	Ross Levine, Christina McLarty Arquette, Bryn Mooser, Stacey Souther
You Can See Everything	2026	Nathan Fielder, Lance Oppenheim	Nathan Fielder, Lance Oppenheim, Tatiana Bears, Maggie Ambrose, Jack Davis
You Don't Nomi	2019	Jeffrey McHale	Ariana Garfinkel, Jeffrey McHale, and Suzanne Zionts
You Had to Be There	2025	Nick Davis	Bonnie Comley, Nick Davis, Stewart F. Lane, Tom Powers, Sue Turley
You Were My First Boyfriend	2023	Cecilia Aldarondo, Sarah Enid Hagey	Ines Hofmann Kanna, Cecilia Aldarondo
You Weren't There: A History of Chicago Punk, 1977–1984	2007	Joe Losurdo, Christina Tillman	Joe Losurdo, Christina Tillman
You've Been Trumped	2011	Anthony Baxter	Richard Phinney
Young Girls Turn 25, The	1993	Agnès Varda	Agnès Varda
Young, Jewish, and Left	2006	Michael Konnie Chameides and Irit Reinheimer	Michael Konnie Chameides and Irit Reinheimer
Your Mommy Kills Animals	2007	Curt Johnson	Maura Flynn, Curt Johnson
Your Neighbor's Son: The Making of a Torturer	1976	Jørgen Flindt Pedersen, Erik Stephensen	Ebbe Preisler
Your Tomorrow	2024	Ali Weinstein	Geoff Morrison, Ali Weinstein
Youssou N'Dour: I Bring What I Love	2008	Elizabeth Chai Vasarhelyi	
Youth in Crisis	1943	N/A	Louis De Rochemont
Youthquake!	1976	N/A	Max B. Miller

== Z ==
† = Series

Title	Year	Director(s)	Producer(s)
Z Channel: A Magnificent Obsession	2004	Xan Cassavetes	Marshall Persinger, Rick Ross
Zappa	2020	Alex Winter	Jade Allen, Devorah DeVries, John Frizzell, Ahmet Zappa
Zeitgeist †	2007–2011	Peter Joseph	Peter Joseph
Zero Days	2016	Alex Gibney	
Zielen Van Napels	2005	Vincent Monnikendam	Sherman De Jesus and Cécile van Eijk
Zodiac Killer Project	2025	Charlie Shackleton	Charlie Shackleton, Anthony Ing, Catherine Bray
Zombie Girl: The Movie	2009	Justin Johnson, Aaron Marshall, Erik Mauck	Justin Johnson, Aaron Marshall, Erik Mauck
Zoo	2007	Robinson Devore	Peggy Case and Alexis Ferris

== See also ==
- List of environmental films
- List of documentary films about agriculture
- List of documentary films about war
