= List of documentary films about Jewish diaspora =

This is a list of documentary films about Jewish diaspora.

- Jews of Iran
- Trip to Jewish Cuba
- Queen of the Mountain
- Next Year in Argentina
- Luboml: My Heart Remembers
- In Search of Happiness
- The Jewish Steppe, a 2001 documentary about a group of Russian Jews who, suffering as a result of prejudice and fearful of pogroms, left their homeland to farm the Crimea
- Balancing Acts
- Baba Luba
- My Yiddishe Momme McCoy
- A Home on the Range
- From Swastika to Jim Crow
- Song of a Jewish Cowboy
- The Jewish Gauchos
