= My Four Children =

- Directed by: Nitza Gonen
- Release date: 2002
- Running time: 53 minutes
- Country: Israel
- Languages: English subtitles and Hebrew

My Four Children is a 2002 documentary about an Israeli mother who takes in four foster children with Down syndrome after two of her own children were killed.

== Summary ==
Both gentle and assertive, Nelly is an ideal mother. Nelly takes the responsibility of four children that are developmentally impaired and have special needs. She treats them as if they were normal children. The documentary show how under her supervision, the children learn to play musical instruments, use appropriate table manners, and feel loved.

Nelly's foster children came from cruel circumstances. Tom and Suzie, the first two children Nelly took in, were previously placed in a foster home where they were abused, including through forced feeding to the point of injury. As a result, Tom and Suzie took long time to trust and feel comfortable in Nelly's home.

The documentary explores what it means to be a mother, whether it's a matter of biology or behavior. Suzie's biological mother explains, quite honestly, that she loved her daughter when she was a baby, but as soon as Suzie started to grow older, and her disorder became evident, she felt incapable of caring for her. She still visits Suzie, now and then, but says that she considers Nelly Suzie's real mother.

What's initially surprising about Nelly's situation is the lack of support she receives from her immediate family. Her husband divorced her because he couldn't handle having four young children in the house again, and her eldest daughter doesn't support Nelly's decision to adopt one of the foster children. While their behavior seems harsh at first, as the documentary progresses, they become more sympathetic. Their lives were just as devastated by the family tragedies as Nelly's; and, perhaps, in some ways, Nelly abandoned her original family when she decided to take in new children.

== Film Festivals ==
- Assim Vivemos Festival 2007, Brazil
- Sprout Film Festival 2004, New York
- Seattle Jewish Film Festival 2004
- DocAviv Film Festival 2002, Israel
- San Francisco Film Festival 2003
- Israeli Film Festival 2003, Hong Kong

== See also ==
Other documentaries about unique Jewish families:

- My Yiddish Momme McCoy
- Balancing Acts
- Divine Food
