= Trees Cry for Rain =

Trees Cry for Rain: A Sephardic Journey
- Directed by: Bonnie Burt
- Release date: 1989
- Running time: 33 min.
- Language: English

Trees Cry for Rain: A Sephardic Journey is a short documentary film by American documentary filmmaker Bonnie Burt that follows "America's Internet Champion of Ladino" Rachel Amado Bortnick, as she explores her Jewish-Turkish heritage and the vanishing world of Sephardic culture and the Ladino language. The film was officially released in 1989, but drew public attention in 1992 with screenings at a number of Jewish film festivals worldwide, including the San Francisco Jewish Film Festival and the Madrid "Festival de Cine Judio" which was dubbed "the biggest Jewish cultural event held in Spain in 500 years". This was followed by a public screening at the Lincoln Center for the Performing Arts in New York, and airing on The Jewish Channel.

The film returned to the screen ten years later at the 2002 Las Vegas Jewish Film Festival. It was featured again in 2011 with a special screening at the 15th Annual Seattle Jewish Film Festival, 22 years after its debut.

The film is used as an academic resource in Middle Eastern studies, Jewish studies and World History, at the collegiate and high school levels.

== Summary ==
Fewer than 25,000 Jews still live in Turkey and, unlike their ancestors, they consider themselves more Turkish than Jewish. Trees Cry for Rain: A Sephardic Journey uses one woman’s childhood memories to reconstruct what life was like for Sephardic Jews in Turkey before modern assimilation took effect.

Jews were executed or forced to convert under Christian rule in Spain before being forced out of the country. Many fled to nearby Turkey, where, for centuries, they were able to maintain their traditions, passing them down through the generations. Trees Cry for Rain shares an intimate interview with Rachael Amado Bortnick, a native of Turkey who left as a young adult, complemented by detailed paintings and illustrations of Turkey, to bring the once-rich culture of Turkey’s Sephardic Jewry to life. Their unique foods, songs, and traditions are explored, and the importance of keeping their unique Judeo-Spanish language alive is impressed upon the viewer.

Sephardic culture continues to be threatened by assimilation, and the Ladino language is in danger of being lost forever. “My generation was the last to speak the language fluently,” Rachael explains. However, the culture’s music has brought about a renewed interest in the language. Sephardic singer, Judy Frankel practices her pronunciations with Rachael, while she sings, “Trees cry for rain and the mountains for wind; So my eyes weep for you, my dear sweetheart.”

Rachael listens intently and confesses that the song’s refrain reminds her of her own situation. “I turn and I say what will become of me? I will die in a strange land.”

== See also ==
Other documentaries about Diaspora Jews:

- Island of Roses: The Jews of Rhodes in Los Angeles—another documentary about Sephardic culture
- Reconstruction
- Next Year in Argentina
- Balancing Acts
- Yearning to Belong
- Thunder in Guyana
