= Professional Revolutionary =

Professional Revolutionary: The Life of Saul Wellman
- Produced by: Judith Montell and Ronald Aronson
- Release date: 2004
- Running time: 65 mins.
- Country: United States
- Language: English

Professional Revolutionary: The Life of Saul Wellman is a 2004 documentary about the life of Saul Wellman.

== Summary ==
Under-educated, Wellman fought in the army, worked in a car factory for Ford and was employed at a printing company; Wellman fought against the Nationalists in the Spanish Civil War and against the Axis in World War II. Wellman returned home at the start of the Cold War, to help organize and lead the communist party in the United States. Then when the 60s came along, Wellman latched onto the civil rights movement. The documentary deals with wheelchair-using Wellman, during the last years of his life, at an Iraq war protest. Throughout his life, Wellman was an organizer and passionate speaker.

Wellman's militant defiance and controversial ideologies began at a young age. “I sucked socialism at my mother's breast,” he jokes. His mother, a Russian immigrant, believed in socialism and took Wellman to hear Eugene Debs, the leading socialist at the time, deliver a speech. But Wellman's defining moment came in high school when he decided to cut school in order to attend a protest. He got expelled as a result. His parents were devastated, but Wellman felt liberated. His last day of formal education was his first day as a revolutionary.

But Wellman's activism was not without controversy. While some have praised him for being “infinitely inspiring” and working towards a communist country, others disagree.

When war erupted in Spain, he and his friends, still young, had a naïve understanding of world politics and social progress, but signed up to fight in the international brigades anyway. “We didn't know our asses from our elbows,” he admits. Later, Wellman became a leader among American Communists, but when the Soviet Union's corruption was exposed, he abandoned the movement to promote Civil Rights and protest the war in Vietnam.

However, Wellman's pursuit of his political passions came with negatives for those close to him. While he was busy with social activism, his wife was left at home to work full-time and raise their children alone. Wellman acknowledges the fact that his career disadvantaged his family, but he felt that his work was necessary to change society.

== Reception ==
The documentary met with mixed reviews. The subject of the film, Wellman, met with more praise than the film itself. Wellman was said to have been an, "infinitely inspiring model to many idealistic youths." And by listing his achievements the flattery of his pupils, reviews establish him as a hero figure.

== See also ==
Other films about American Jews:

- A Home on the Range
- Awake Zion
- From Swastika to Jim Crow
- My Yiddish Momme McCoy
- Song of a Jewish Cowboy

Other links relevant to Saul Wellman:

- Jewish volunteers in the Spanish Civil War
