= Yearning to Belong =

- Directed by: Debra Gonsher Vinik and David Vinik
- Release date: 2007
- Running time: 58 min.
- Language: English

Yearning to Belong is a documentary about the Abayudaya Jews in Uganda and their struggle to be recognized by the international Jewish community.

== Summary ==
The Abayudaya's conviction to Jewish faith goes back almost 90 years. By 1919, Kakungulu (a Christian preacher until an epiphany led him to embrace Judaism) had convinced 3,000 of his community to follow the ancient example of Abraham and receive circumcisions. And while he did his best to ensure that other Jewish rites were adhered to, the community's remote location made proper rabbinic access impossible.

In early 2002, however, five Conservative rabbis agreed to journey to Nabugoye Hill in rural Uganda to fulfill the Abayudaya's request that they be formally converted to Judaism and accepted into the larger worldwide Jewish community. Filmmaker Debra Gonsher Vinik and her film crew followed along and captured the emotional conversions.

During the 1970s the Abayudaya's mud hut synagogues and lands were confiscated by the government of Idi Amin, and they were barred from publicly practicing Judaism. After Amin was overthrown and freedom of worship restored, uncertainty and religious malaise fell over the community, until a youth movement reinvigorated the faithful. Vinik's camera now tracks two of the leaders of that movement, Gershom Sizomu and his brother J.J., as they visit the U.S. to drum up public support for acceptance of their conversion.

Gaining acceptance by all branches of the Jewish community proves difficult, however. Vinik arranges for a meeting with rabbis from three different Jewish denominations, and the camera is rolling when the brothers are told how their status as Jews is questionable based on the narrow definitions of Orthodox conversion. Later, Vinik asks noted theologian Rabbi Ismar Schorsch about the reasoning for such "inflexible" spiritual stances. "The sad fact is that conversion in Judaism has become a power struggle between Orthodox and the non-Orthodox, to the great detriment of the Jewish people," he says.

== See also ==
Other documentaries about atypical Jewish communities:

- Sister Wife
- A Home on the Range
- Island of Roses
- From Swastika to Jim Crow

Other films produced by Debra Gonsher Vinik, David Vinik and Diva Communications:
