= Divine Food =

Divine Food: 100 Years in the Kosher Delicatessen Trade
- Directed by: Bill Chayes
- Based on: The Deli Book by L. John Harris
- Produced by: L. John Harris; Bill Chayes
- Production companies: CreateSpace; Judah L. Magnes Museum
- Distributed by: Deli Project Production
- Release date: October 22, 1998 (KQED-TV)
- Running time: 47 minutes
- Country: United States
- Language: English

Divine Food: 100 Years in the Kosher Delicatessen Trade is a 1998 American documentary film directed by Bill Chayes about how immigrant butcher Isaac Oscherwitz became the patriarch of a kosher food corporation that serves the dietary needs of Jewish people across the United States.

The film reveals the step-by-step, behind-the-scenes process of butchering kosher meat, and also looks into the lives of the Oscherwitz family through personal interviews, family stories, and archival home videos.

== Summary ==
Born in Germany, Isaac Oscherwitz was a butcher who emigrated to America in the 1880s because of oppression and poverty. When he arrived in Cincinnati, he started his own sausage factory, which created jobs and a delicious product for the city’s surprisingly well-populated Jewish community. But the Oscherwitzes also established their public face to the community through a family-run storefront shop, where they sold their meats and other classic Jewish delicacies. Decades later, Isaac’s five sons extended the business to Chicago, which had become the center of the meat packing industry, and today the Oscherwitz family is responsible for well-known brands such as Best Kosher, Shofar, and Sinai.

This familial intimacy extends beyond the immediate family members to the way they treat everyone involved in the business, from factory workers to customers. “I don’t think my husband ever felt like his customers were his customers,” one woman says, “they were his friends.” Another man, who took a job with the Oscherwitzes after he lost everything to the Holocaust, speaks highly of his employers. “It was such a family feeling,” he explaining how warm and welcoming his coworkers have been.

The appeal of a family-owned product helped make the Oscherwitz brand popular, but fiscal success also jeopardized the family-run nature of the business. Before the swell of success, business meetings between the Oscherwitz brothers were a literal yelling contest, where arguments were won by the most powerful voice and, despite all the screaming, everyone left on good terms. But a big business couldn’t run in the same way. The documentary shares the Oscherwitzes’ inside struggles to keep their booming business family-run and shows the effects on everyone when they were bought out by a subsidiary of the Sara Lee Corporation

== Release ==
First released in 1998, Divine Food has been broadcast on 18 PBS affiliate stations across the United States and has screened at film festivals 1998 through 2013. It is also serves as an educational documentary used by many Jewish schools to describe and illustrate the Kosher manufacturing process in America, and as an inspirational story of an immigrant family's successful growth and development within the country.

The film was released on VHS in 1999 by Ergo Media, and on DVD in 2008 by Chayes Productions though Harris Publications.

== See also ==
- List of American films of 1998
- Agriprocessors
- Kashrut
- Legal aspects of ritual slaughter

Other documentaries about Jewish-Americans:

- Echoes from a Ghost Minyan
- Unwanted Cinema
- Balancing Acts
