= Island of Roses: The Jews of Rhodes in Los Angeles =

1995 film directed by Gregori Viens

- Directed by: Gregori Viens
- Release date: 1995
- Running time: 55 min.
- Country: US
- Languages: English, Italian and French Ladino with subtitles

Island of Roses: The Jews of Rhodes in Los Angeles is a 1995 documentary about the dying Sephardic community in Los Angeles. The film shares interviews with some of the last surviving immigrants, who offer nostalgic memories of their lost home, and explores how the once vibrant community of Rhodes Jews in Los Angeles now struggles to preserve its traditions as younger, assimilated generations have to make a conscious effort to maintain the practices of their ancestors.

== Summary ==
The Sephardic Jews of Rhodes were once Spaniards who came to find an idyllic new home in the Greek island of Rhodes. The same night that Christopher Columbus set sail in 1492, the King and Queen of Spain forced all Jews out of their country. Sephardic refugees settled throughout the Mediterranean, and a large number of them chose to make their home on the beautiful Rhodes, where almond and lemon trees grew and the smell of roses was always in the air.

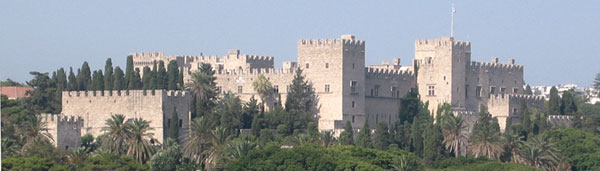
Palace of the Grand Master in the city of Rhodes

For centuries the Jews of Rhodes lived peacefully under the Ottoman-Turkish rule, preserving the medieval form of the Ladino language they took with them from Spain and practicing their own distinct Sephardic traditions. But the quiet island was invaded by Germany in 1944, and Rhodes Jews were among the many sent off in cattle cars to their deaths.

The Mediterranean island of Rhodes was once heavily populated by Jews, but only a few still live there today. Many of those who survived and fled World War II and its aftermath immigrated to Los Angeles, where the warm weather and sunny beach reminded them of home.

== Awards ==
Silver Screen Award at the US International Film and Video Festival, 1995

== See also ==
- Trees Cry for Rain—another documentary about Sephardic culture

Other documentaries about unique Jewish communities in America:

- A Home on the Range
- Song of a Jewish Cowboy
- Birth of a Community: Jews and the Gold Rush
- Pushcarts and Plantations: Jewish Life in Louisiana
- Echoes from a Ghost Minyan
- Jews and Buddhism
