= King of Hollywood =

King of Hollywood may refer to:

- Douglas Fairbanks's nickname
- Clark Gable's nickname
- Harvey Weinstein's nickname
- The King of Hollywood: The Story of Clark Gable, a 1962 book by Charles Samuels
- "King of Hollywood", a 1979 song by The Eagles from their album, The Long Run
- "King of Hollywood", a 2014 song by Withered Hand from New Gods

== See also ==
- Louis B. Mayer, King of Hollywood, a 1999 documentary film
