= Pushcarts and Plantations: Jewish Life in Louisiana =

1998 film

- Directed by: Brian Cohen
- Release date: 1998
- Running time: 54 min.
- Country: United States
- Language: English

Pushcarts and Plantations is a 1998 documentary about Louisiana Jewry from award-winning director Brian Cohen. The documentary combines interviews with historians and locals to tell the 300-year-old history of different Jewish communities found in the North, South, and New Orleans. The documentary shares anecdotes about local heroes, little known facts, and personal accounts.

== Summary ==
Sephardic traders were the first Jews to settle in Louisiana, and despite antisemitic legislation, their community thrived. Over a hundred years later in the 1830s and '40s, a large number of Jews from Alsace-Lorraine settled in northern Louisiana.

Since early settlement, some Jews have integrated Southern culture into Jewish culture. The film interviews two little old ladies who recently put out a Kosher-Creole cookbook, which instructs observant Jews to whip up "Fake Frog's Legs" or "Oysters Mock-a-Feller" — New Orleans's own oysters Rockefeller made with gefilte fish.

The documentary explores what it means to be Jewish in a community where it's generally assumed that everyone is Christian. "Lafayette is not New York," one woman says. "You're not surrounded by Jews. So you can't just decide, I'll be Jewish and just be." If you want to be Jewish, she explains, you have to be an active Jew. One mother in Southern Louisiana recalls that in order to have her children bar and bat mitzvahed she had to teach them Hebrew herself and then drive them hours away to New Orleans for the ceremony.

== Reception ==
"Poignant...with evocative voices and image," said Museum of the Southern Jewish experience.

"A thoughtful and compassionate documentary," said Toronto Jewish Film Festival

== See also ==
Other documentaries about Jewish communities in Amierica:

- Island of Roses
- A Home on the Range
- Birth of a Community: Jews and the Gold Rush
- Jews and Buddhism
