= Ramin Farahani =

Iranian-Dutch filmmaker (born 1969)

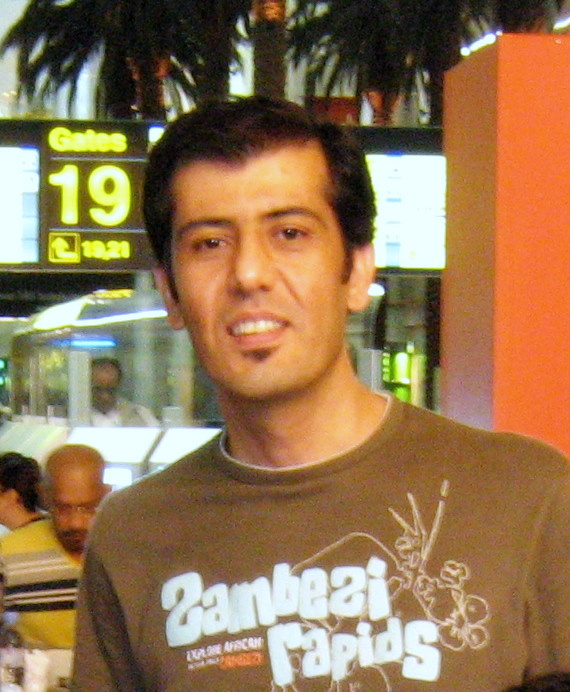
- Born: 1969 (age 56–57); Tehran
- Occupation: Documentary filmmaker
- Notable work: Jews of Iran
- Website: raminfarahani.com

Ramin Farahani is an Iranian-Dutch filmmaker.

Born in 1969 in Tehran, Farahani started with photography short films in 1987, and studied film directing at the Cinema and Theater department of the Tehran University of Art between 1989 and 1993.

In 1994, he moved to the Netherlands where he studied at the Dutch Film and Television Academy of Amsterdam from 1997 to 1999. After 12 years in the Netherlands as a minority, he returned to Iran to document the Jewish communities there, spending three months in 2002 working within the main Jewish communities of Iran to document their lives. His documentary film Jews of Iran was released in 2005.

He is now translating books and working on new film projects.
