= Queen of the Mountain =

Coordinates: 38°02′07″N 38°45′48″E

- Directed by: Martha Goell Lubell
- Written by: Sharon Mulally; Carol Rosenbaum
- Produced by: Martha Goell Lubell
- Cinematography: Peter Brownscombe
- Edited by: Sharon Mulally
- Music by: Sumi Tonooka
- Distributed by: Women Make Movies
- Release date: 2005
- Running time: 56 minutes
- Country: United States
- Language: English

Queen of the Mountain is a 2005 documentary film about Theresa Goell, a middle-aged woman who, in 1947, left her husband and son to dig beneath the sanctuary of Nemrud Dagh. Goell was fascinated by this shrine to King Antiochus I Theos of Commagene, which had been neglected by previous archaeologists.

Queen of the Mountain tells her story through archival footage, family photographs, oral histories, commentary from Goell's friends and her own letters. The New York Times said it offered a "strong, rich narrative with visuals to match."

== Reception ==
The New York Times wrote,

Tess Goell was the kind of American heroine that seemed to exist only in 1930s movies, played by Katharine Hepburn or Rosalind Russell. They were women bravely striding into what was largely believed to be a man's world — flying planes, battling city hall, working in formerly all-male offices or newsrooms. Goell strode into archaeology, a divorced, hearing-impaired Jewish woman amid Muslims in southern Turkey.

== See also ==
- Jews of Iran
- Pola's March
- Marion's Triumph
- My Yiddish Momme McCoy
