= The Jewish Steppe =

2001 film by Valeri Ovchinnikov

- Directed by: Valery Ovchinnikov
- Release date: 2001
- Running time: 16 minutes
- Language: English

The Jewish Steppe is a 2001 documentary about a group of Russian Jews who, suffering as a result of prejudice and fearful of pogroms, left their homeland to farm the Crimea. Established in the 1920s, their Soviet agrarian commune was destroyed in late 30s.

== Summary ==
"Why should the Jewish people go to Palestine where the land is less productive and requires big investments?" a Jewish newspaper asked at the time of the settlement, "Who go so far if the fertile Crimean land is beckoning to the Jewish people?"

At the turn of the twentieth century, antisemitism was common in Russia. Legislation was passed that limited Jews to working only in retail and handicrafts. When these laws were lifted, around the time the Russian Revolution of 1917, pogroms broke out. In 1924, about 30,000 Jews left for the Crimean Peninsula. Rare pictures and film footage from the Russian State Film and Photo Archive are narrated in The Jewish Steppe to explain how they lived there.

One newspaper wrote that everyone on the steppe was competing with each other to work harder. When, in 1931, famine occurred in Russia, the Jewish settlements continued to have an abundant harvest that helped feed the rest of the nation during its grain shortage.

Two years after it was settled, the area was recognized as the Soviet Union's first Jewish district. They went on to establish schools and two colleges.

"As a result of healthy life and labor," a local farmer commented in a newspaper, "peace of mind is replacing the nervousness typical for Jewish people. Movements have become measured, and faces have become calm." He went on to say that these changes were particularly noticeable in the younger generation.

Under Stalinist repression, the commune was destroyed in late 30s, leaving only archival footage and documents.

== See also ==
- List of documentary films about Jewish diaspora
