= Mount Nemrut =

Mountain in Adıyaman, Turkey

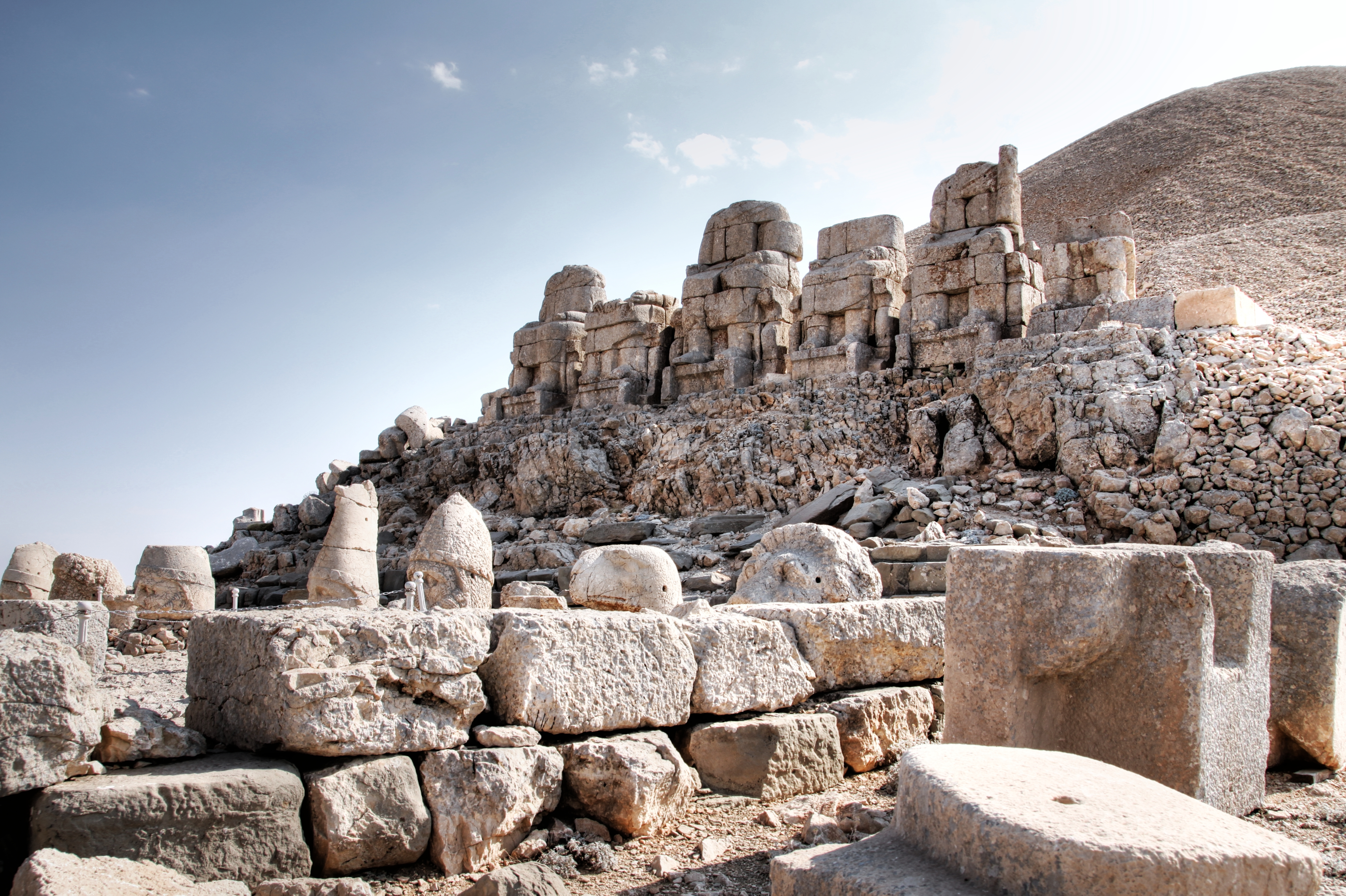

Highest point
- Elevation: 2,134 m (7,001 ft)
- Coordinates: 37°58′50″N 38°44′27″E

Geography
- Location within Turkey
- Location: Adıyaman Province, Turkey

UNESCO World Heritage Site
- Official name: Nemrut Dağ
- Criteria: Cultural: i, iii, iv
- Reference: 448
- Inscription: 1987 (11th Session)
- Area: 11 ha (27 acres)

Mount Nemrut or Nemrud (Turkish: Nemrut Dağı; Kurdish: Çiyayê Nemrûdê; Armenian: Նեմրութ լեռ; Greek: Όρος Νεμρούτ) is a 2,150-metre-high (7,054 ft) mountain in southeastern Turkey, notable for the summit where a number of large statues are erected around what is assumed to be a royal tomb from the 1st century BC. It is one of the highest peaks in the eastern Taurus Mountains.

It was designated a UNESCO World Heritage Site in 1987.

== Location and description ==
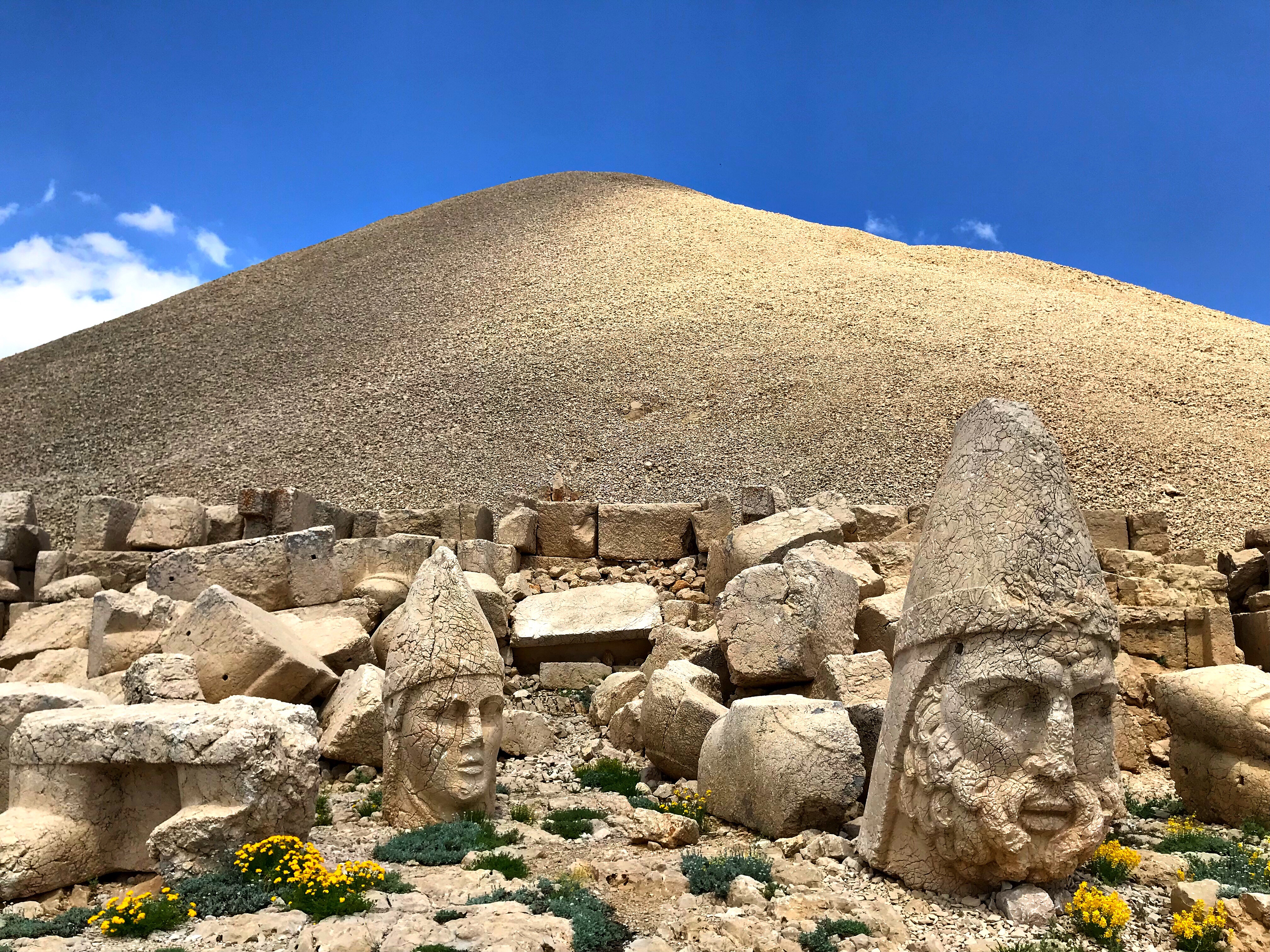
Some of the statues near the peak of Mount Nemrut

Mount Nemrut, also spelt Nemrud, lies in the Anti-Taurus range in Adıyaman Province, Turkey. It is 2,150 m (7,050 ft) high.

In 62 BC, King Antiochus I of Commagene built on the mountain top a tomb-sanctuary flanked by huge statues 8–9-metre high (26–30 ft) of himself, two lions, two eagles, and various composite Greek and Iranian gods, such as Heracles-Artagnes-Ares, Zeus-Oromasdes, and Apollo-Mithras-Helios-Hermes. When constructing this pantheon, Antiochus drew heavily from Parthian and Armenian traditions in order to reinvigorate the religion of his ancestral dynasty. The statues were once seated, with names of each god inscribed on them. At some point the heads of the statues were removed from their bodies, and they are now scattered throughout the site.

The pattern of damage to the heads (notably to noses) suggests that they were deliberately damaged as a result of iconoclasm. The statues have not been restored to their original places. The site also preserves stone slabs with bas-relief figures that are thought to have formed a large frieze. These slabs, or stelae, depict Antiochus' Greek and Persian ancestors.

The same statues and ancestors found throughout the site can also be found on the tumulus at the site, which is 49 metres (161 ft) tall and 152 m (499 ft) in diameter. It is possible that the tumulus of loose rock was devised to protect a tomb from robbers, since any excavation would quickly fill in. The statues appear to have Greek-style faces, but Persian clothing and hair-styling.

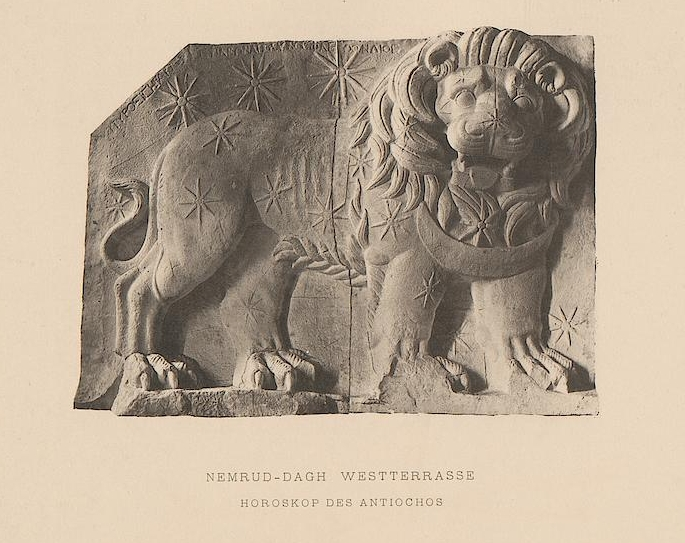
The Lion with the Stars

The western terrace contains a large slab with a lion, showing an arrangement of stars and the planets Jupiter, Mercury, and Mars. The composition was taken to be a chart of the sky on 7 July 62 BCE. This may be an indication of when construction began on this monument. The eastern portion is well preserved, being composed of several layers of rock, and a path following the base of the mountain is evidence of a walled passageway linking the eastern and western terraces. Possible uses for this site are thought to have included religious ceremonies, owing to the astronomical and religious nature of the monument.

The arrangement of such statues is known by the term hierothesion. Similar arrangements have been found at Arsameia on Nymphaios at the hierothesion of Antiochus' father, Mithridates I Callinicus.

== Ancient history ==
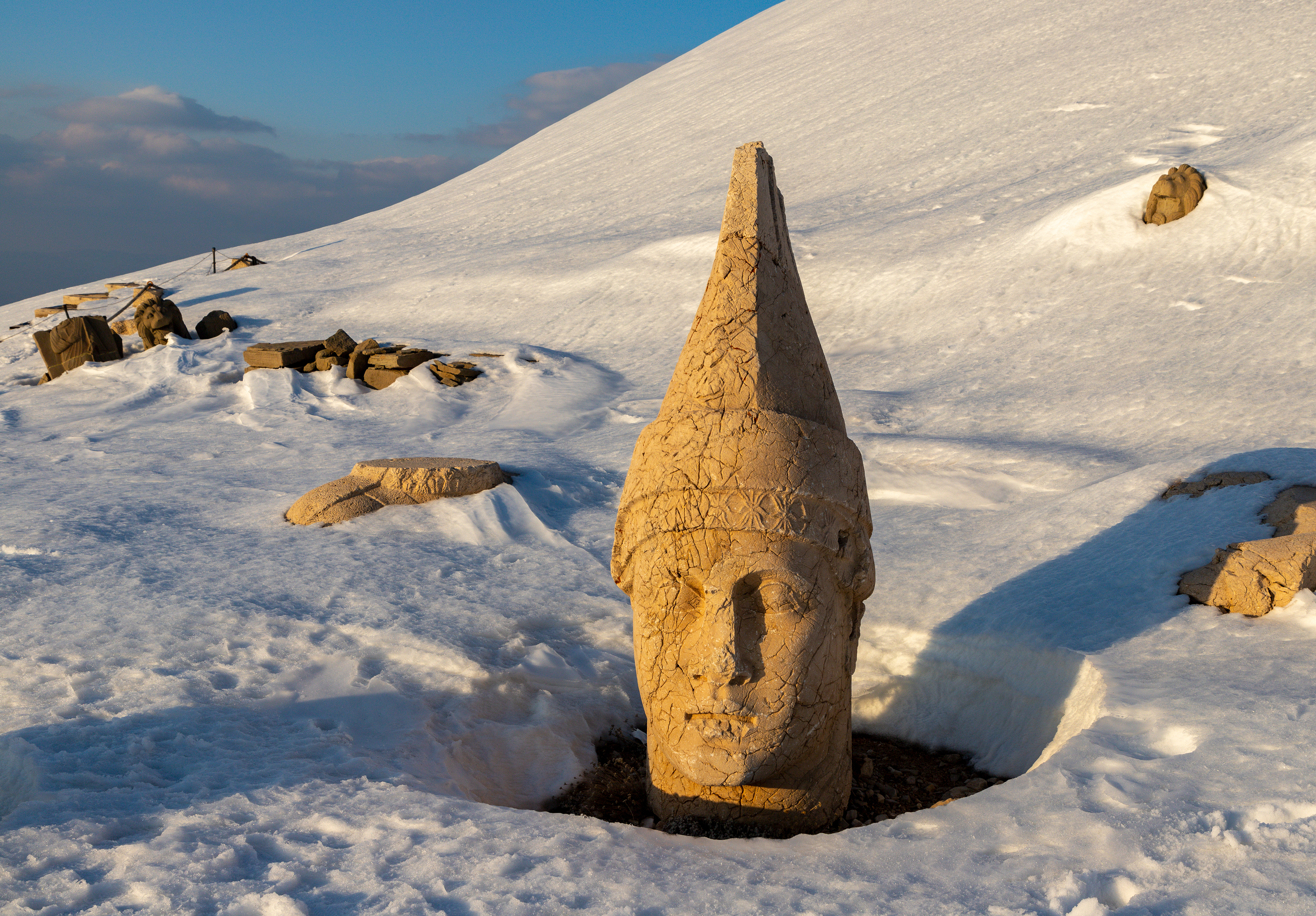
West Terrace: Head of King Antiochos I in snow at sunset.

The religious sanctuary established in Mount Nemrut was part of Antiochus' political program to revive the Persian traditions of Commagene. In order to do so, he merged and adjusted the political and religious traditions of Cappadocia, Pontus, and Armenia.

Following the practice of the Mithridatic rulers of Pontus, Antiochus stressed his descent from the Achaemenids and Seleucids, and also claimed the royal legacy of Armenia. One of the essential parts of this identity was the then newly established Greco-Iranian pantheon, which was worshipped at specific sanctuaries in Commagene.

== Modern history ==
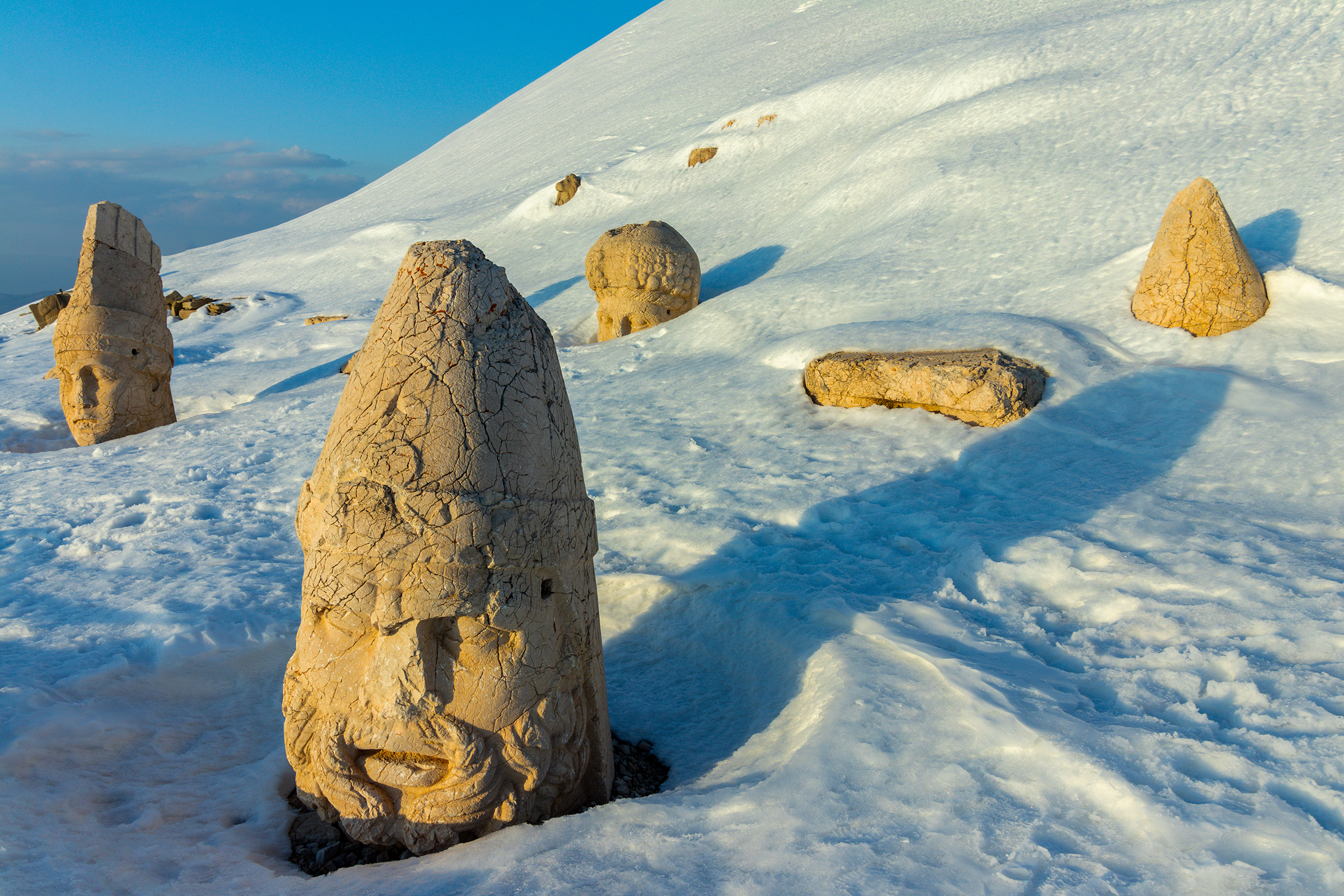
Head of King Antiochos I (left) and Heracles-Artagnes-Ares (foreground) on the West terrace

The site was excavated in 1881 by Karl Sester, a German engineer assessing transport routes for the Ottomans. After her first visit in 1947, Theresa Goell dedicated her life to the site, starting campaigns in 1954. Subsequent excavations have failed to reveal the tomb of Antiochus. This is nevertheless still believed to be the site of his burial. The statues, all of them "beheaded", have not been restored to their original condition.

Turkish photographer Ara Güler's photo-reportages of Mount Nemrut and the ancient city of Aphrodisias, created in the late 1950s, are considered among his most significant works.

== World Heritage Site ==
In 1987, Mount Nemrut was made a World Heritage Site by UNESCO. Tourists typically visit Nemrut during April through October. The nearby town of Adıyaman is a popular place for car and bus trips to the site, and one can also travel from there by helicopter. There are also overnight tours running out of Malatya or Kahta.

The UNESCO entry states:

The mausoleum of Antiochus I (69–34 B.C.), who reigned over Commagene, a kingdom founded north of Syria and the Euphrates after the breakup of Alexander's empire, is one of the most ambitious constructions of the Hellenistic period. The syncretism of its pantheon, and the lineage of its kings, which can be traced back through two sets of legends, Greek and Persian, is evidence of the dual origin of this kingdom's culture.

== Gallery ==
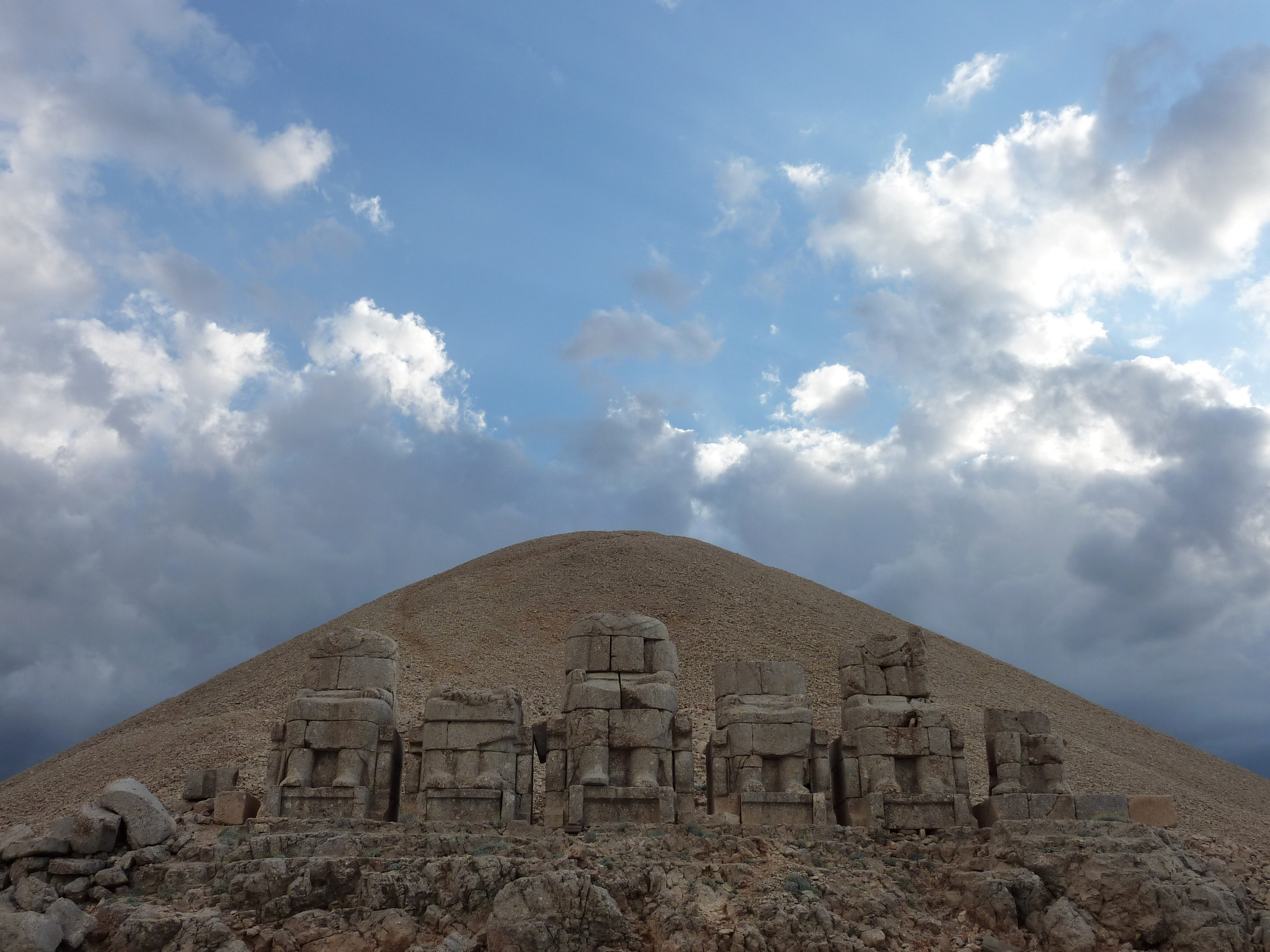
Mount Nemrut, East Terrace thrones in foreground

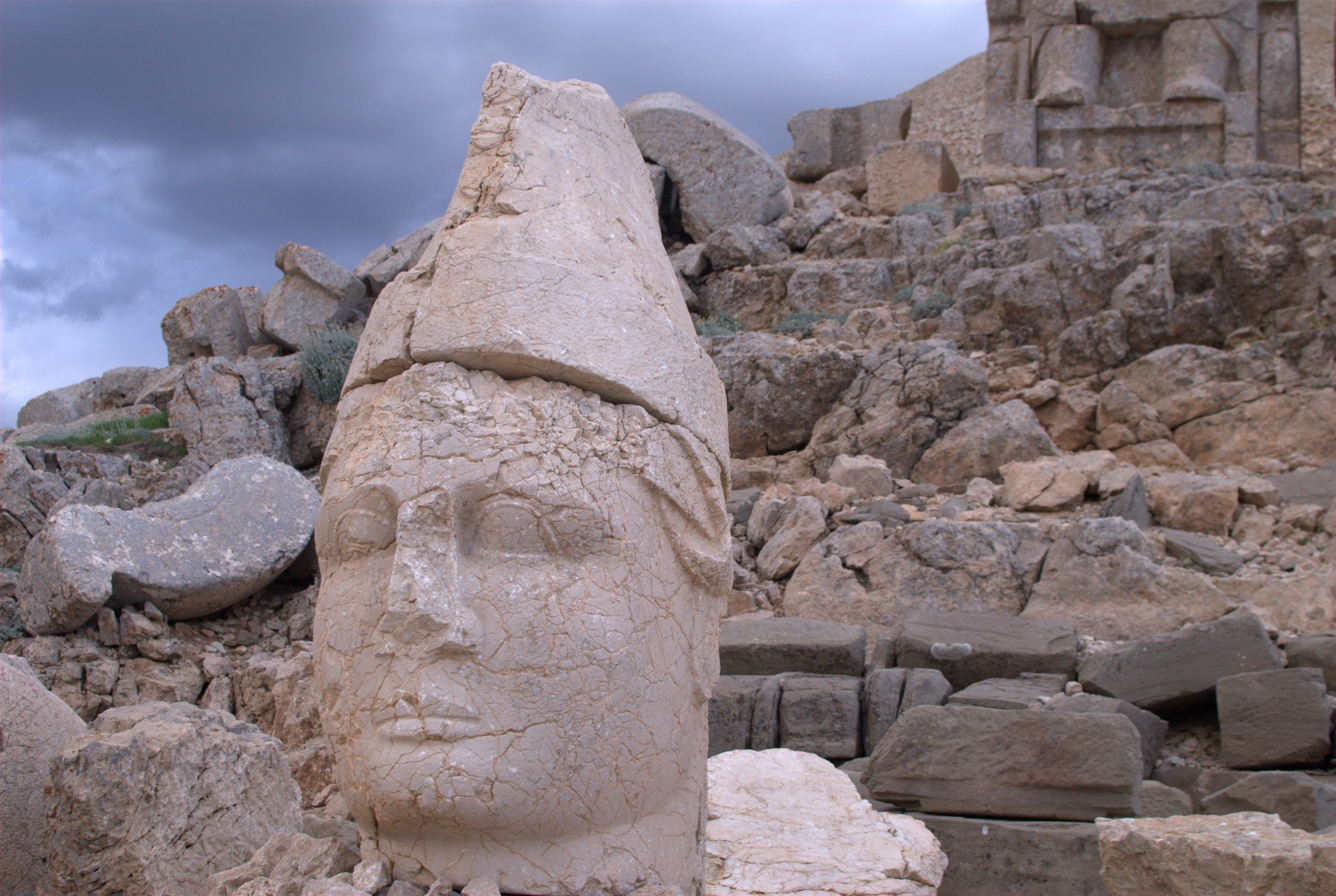
East terrace: Head of Antiochus I

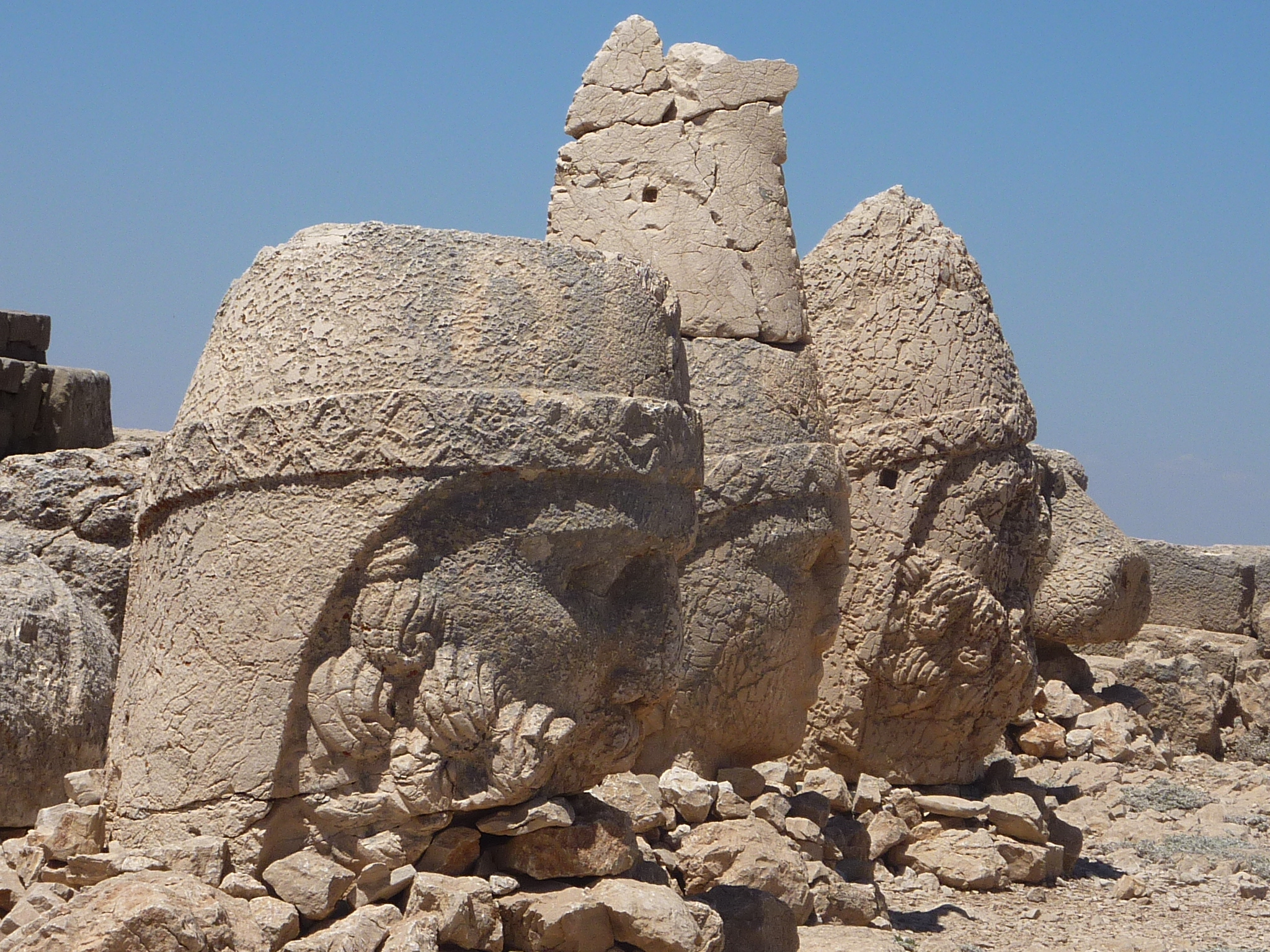
East terrace: Heads of Zeus, Apollo, Heracles, (eagle, hidden) and lion

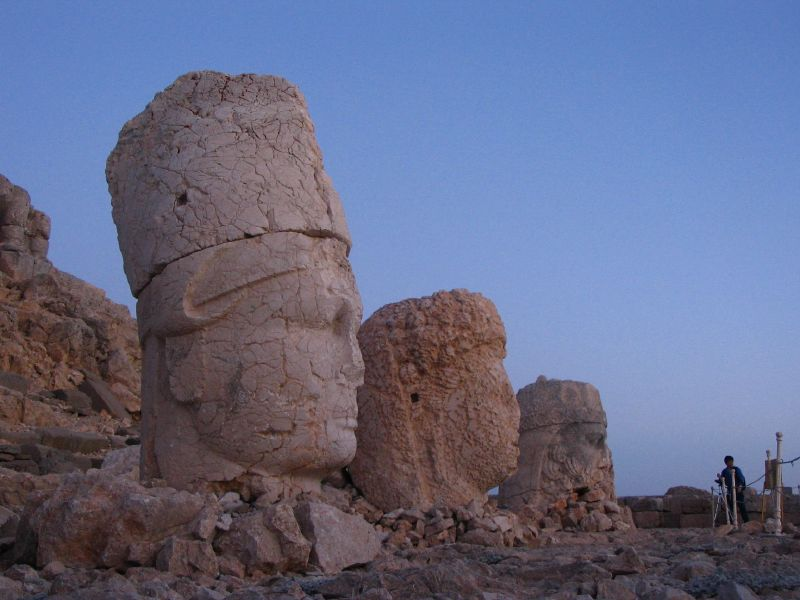
East terrace: Heads of Antiochus I, Kommagene and Zeus

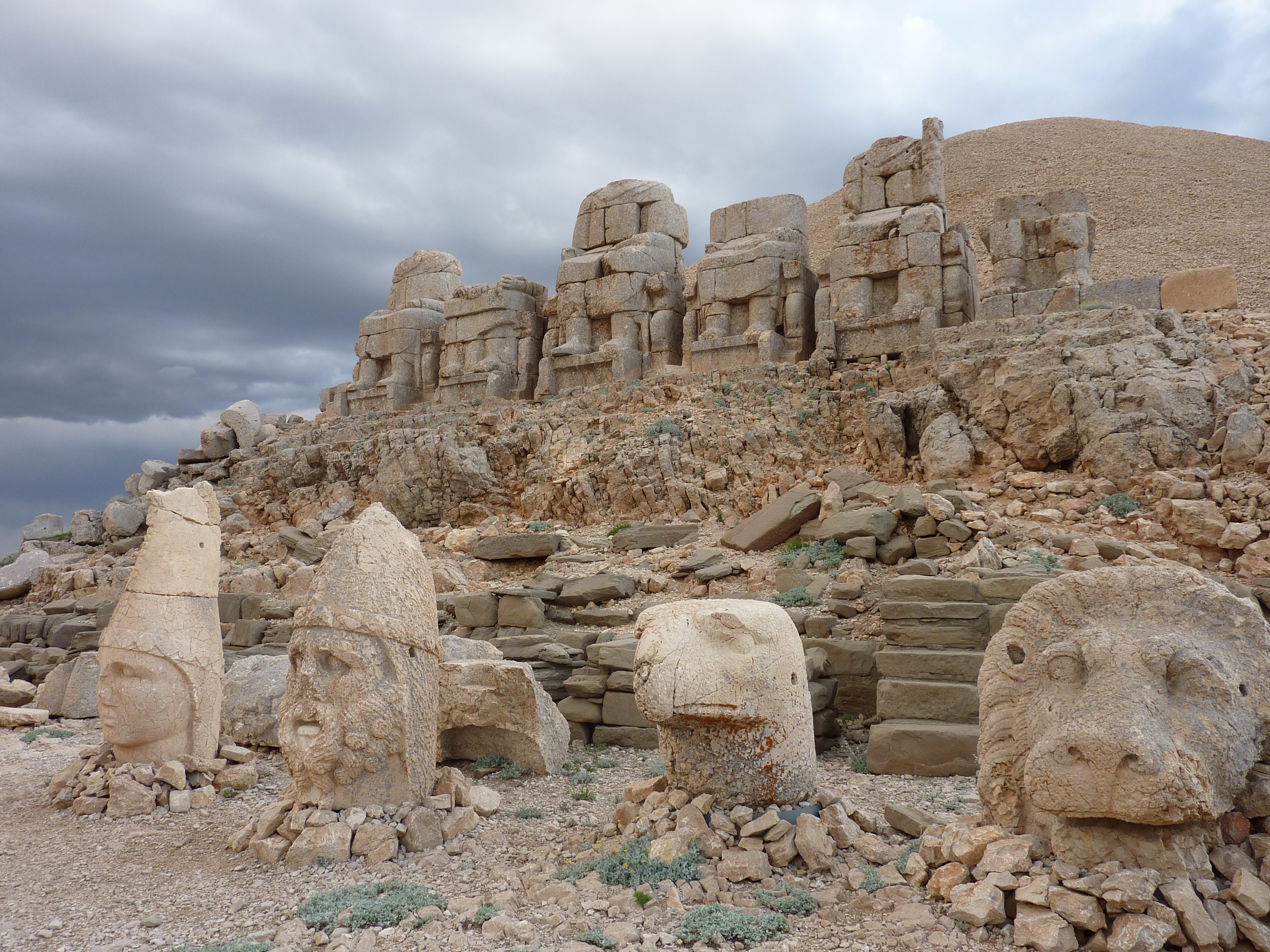
East terrace: Apollo-Mithra-Helios-Hermes, Heracles-Artagnes-Ares, Persian eagle, and lion

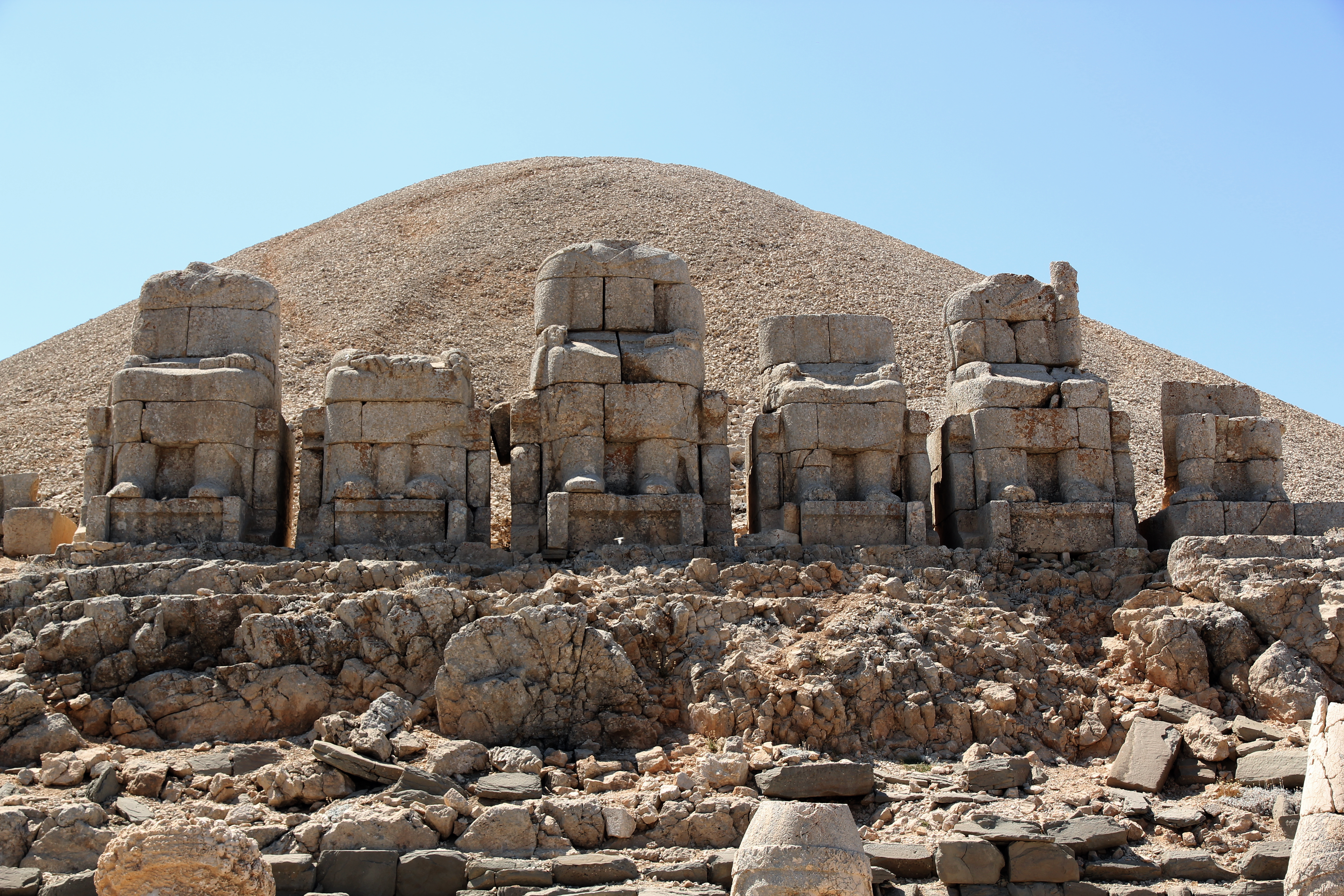
East Terrace: Thrones

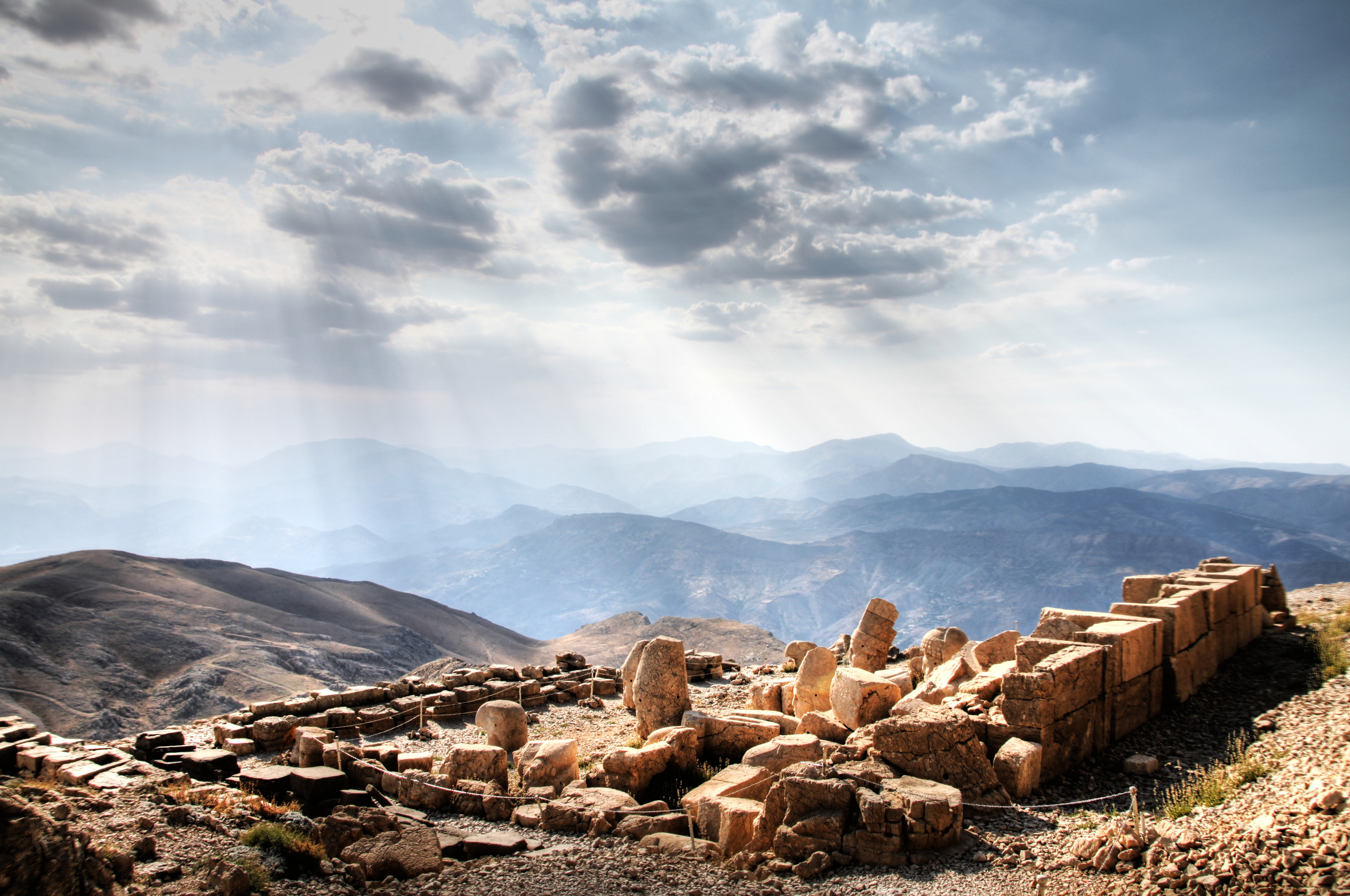
West terrace

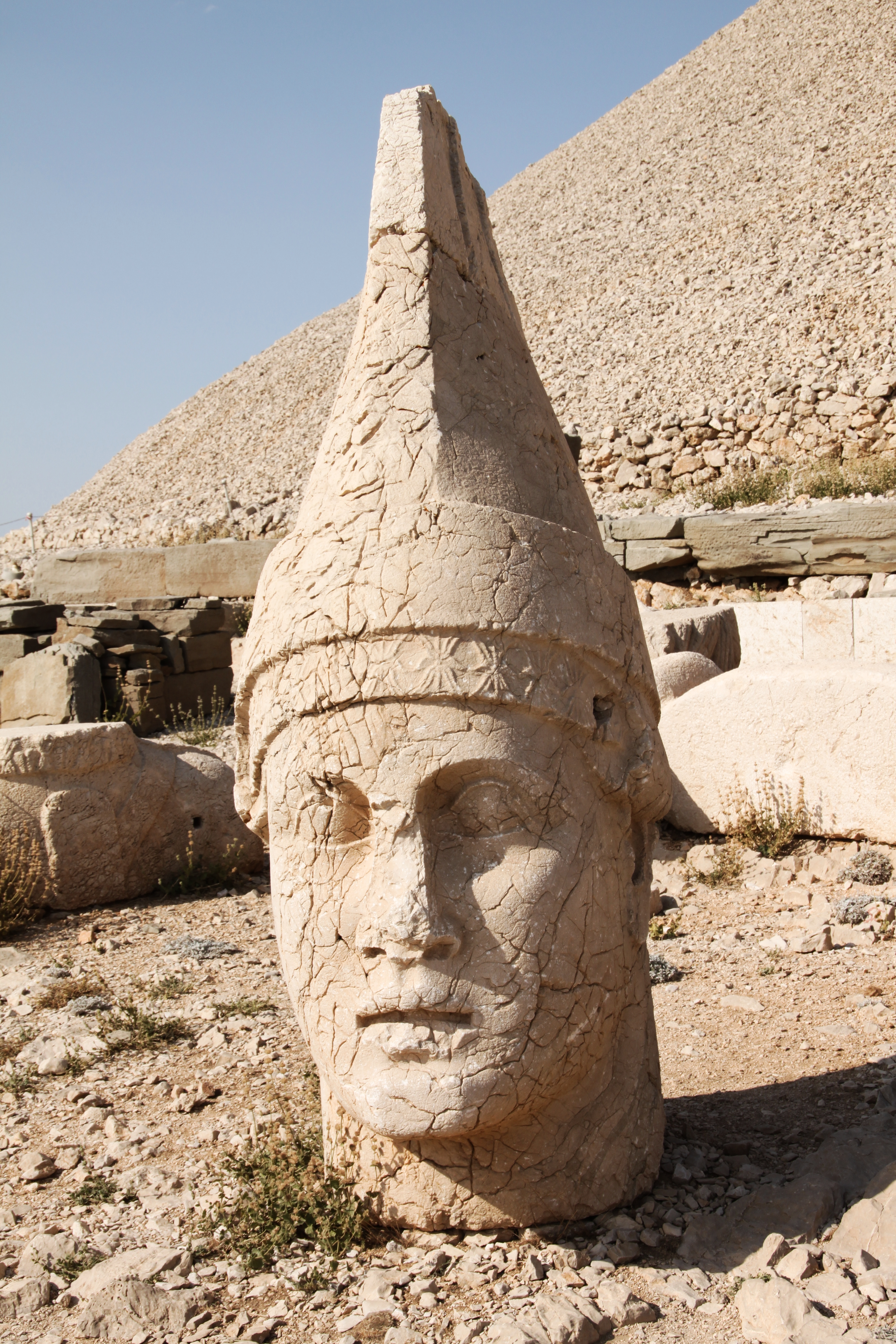
West terrace: Head of Apollo-Mithra-Helios-Hermes

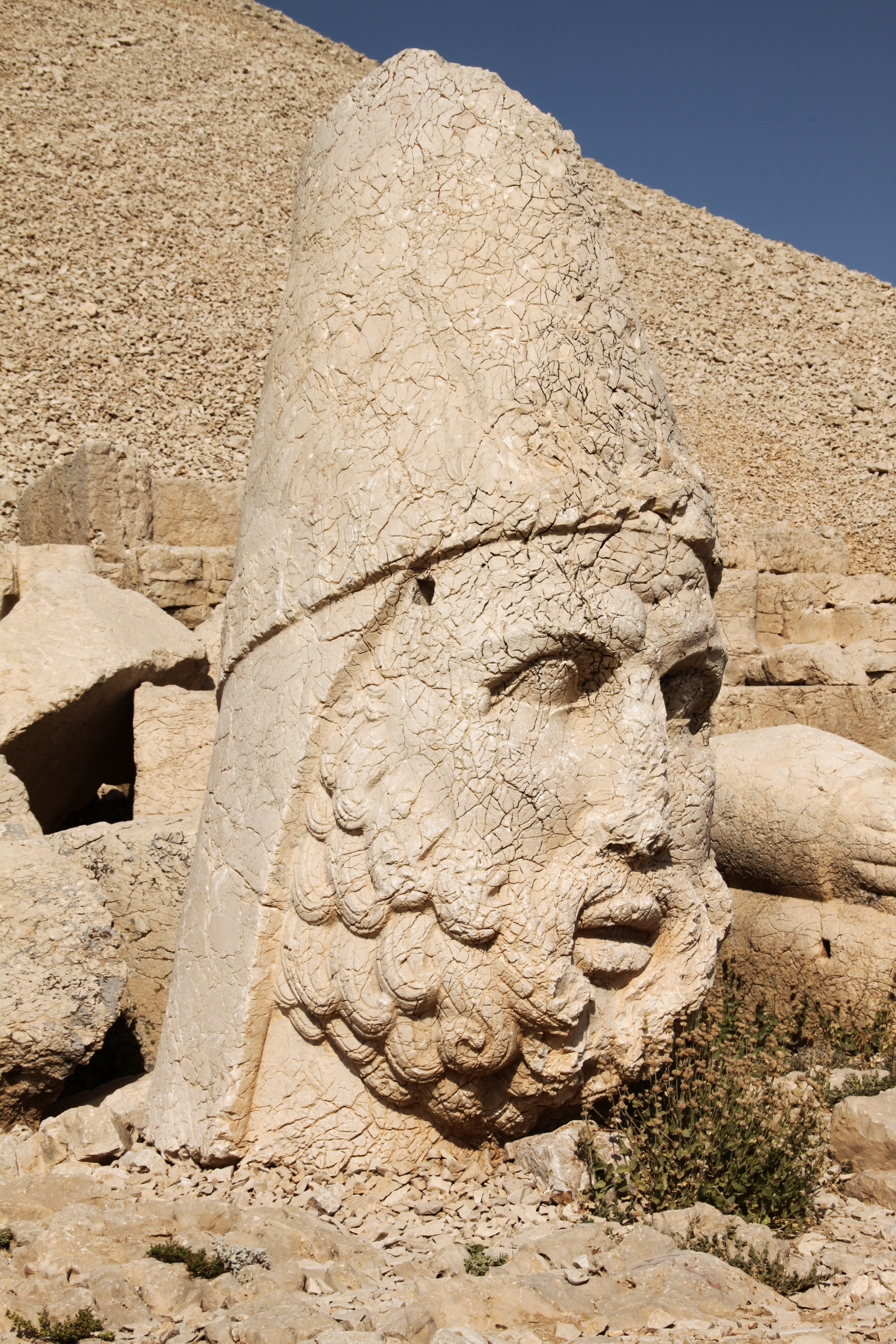
West terrace: Zeus-Oromasdes

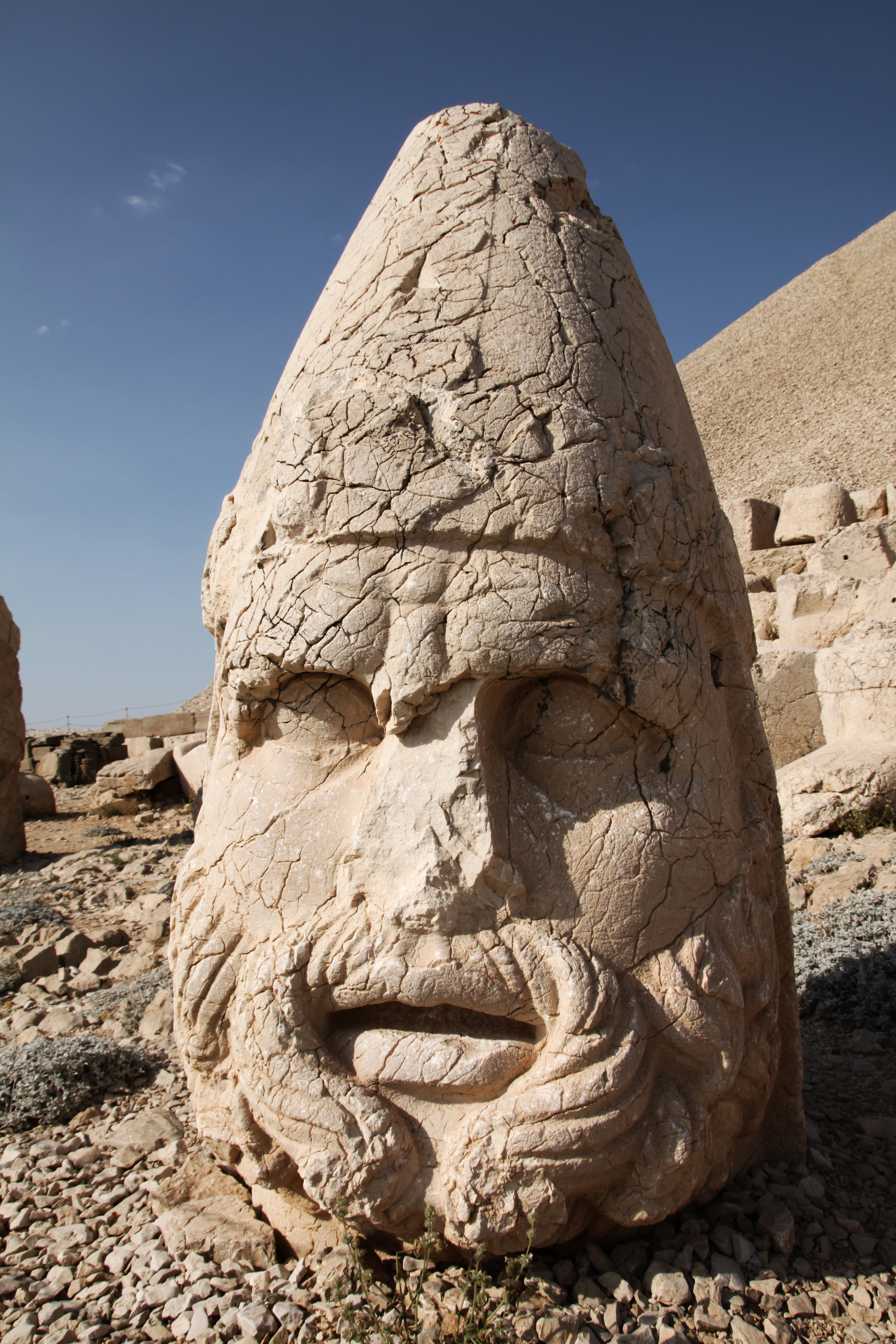
West terrace: Heracles-Artagnes-Ares

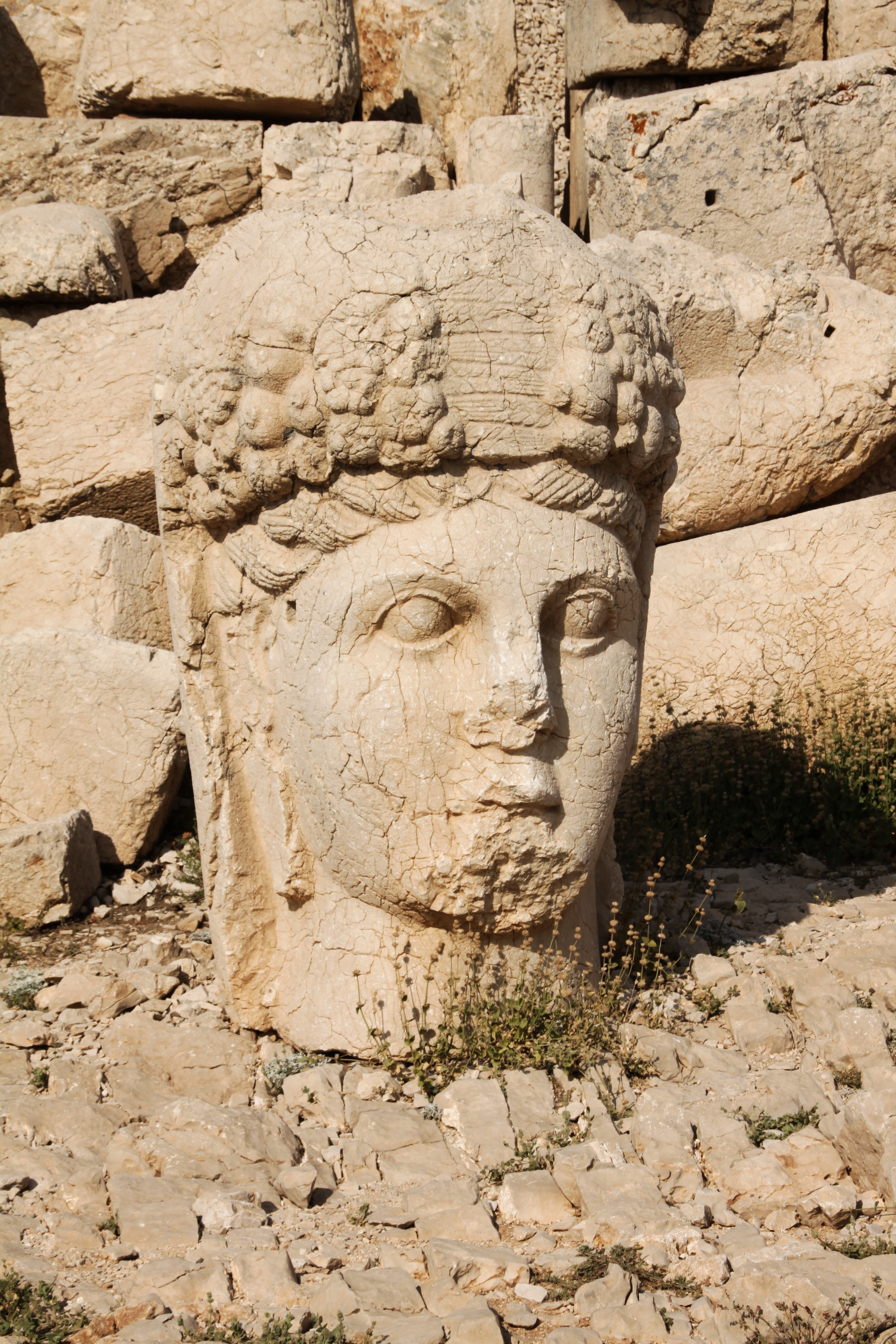
West terrace: Head of Goddess of Kommagene (Tyche)

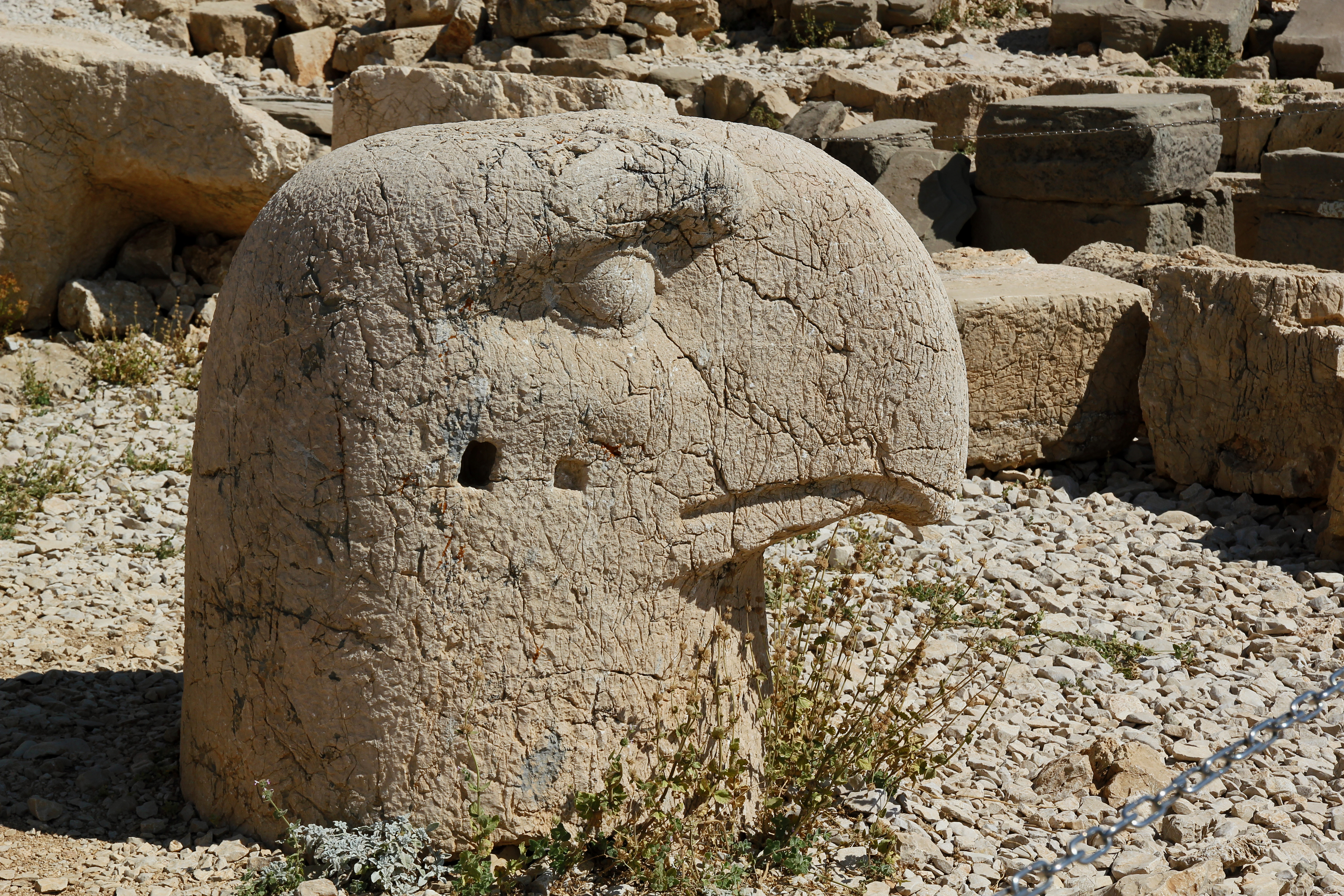
West terrace: Head of Persian eagle

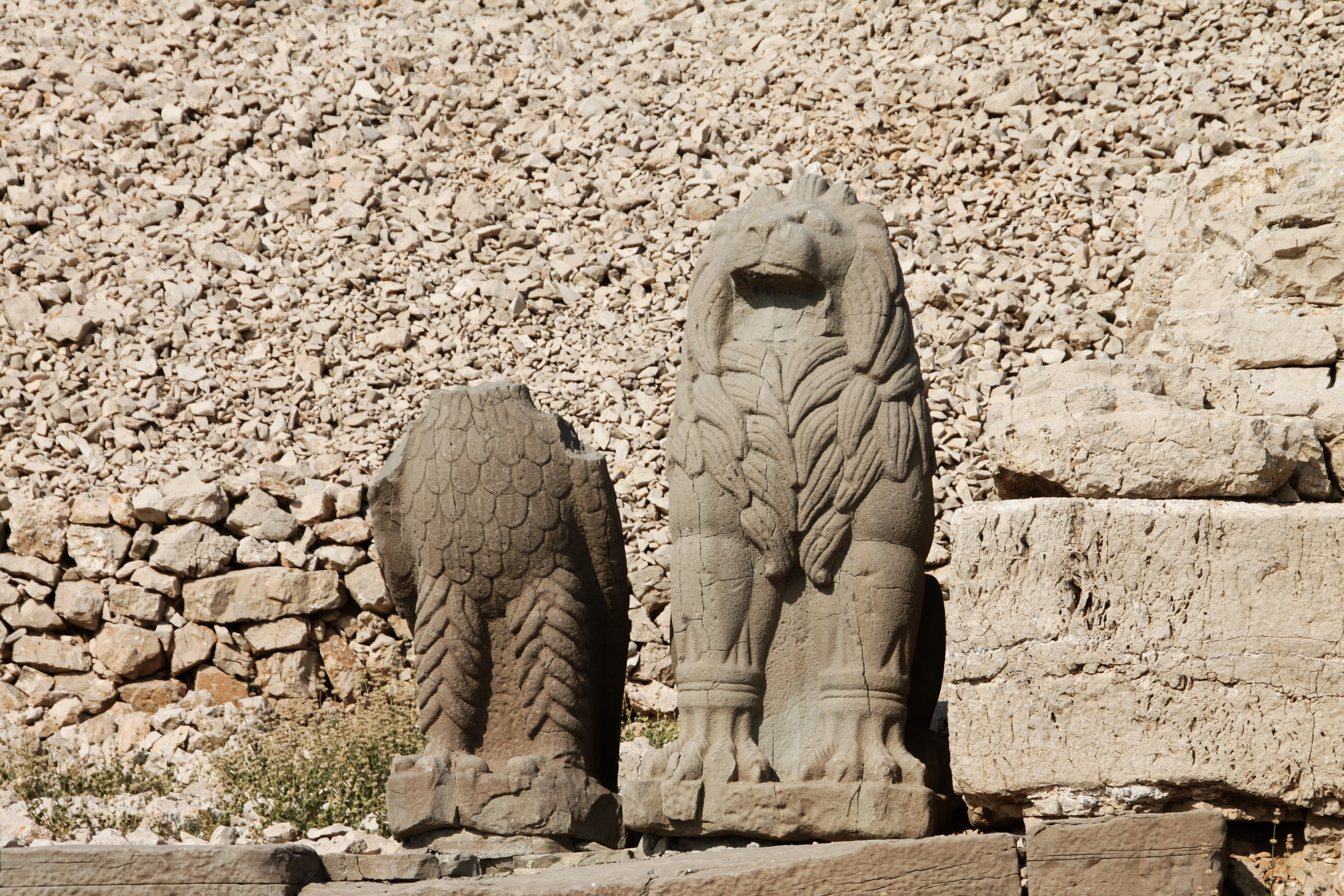
West terrace: Sandstone eagle and lion bodies

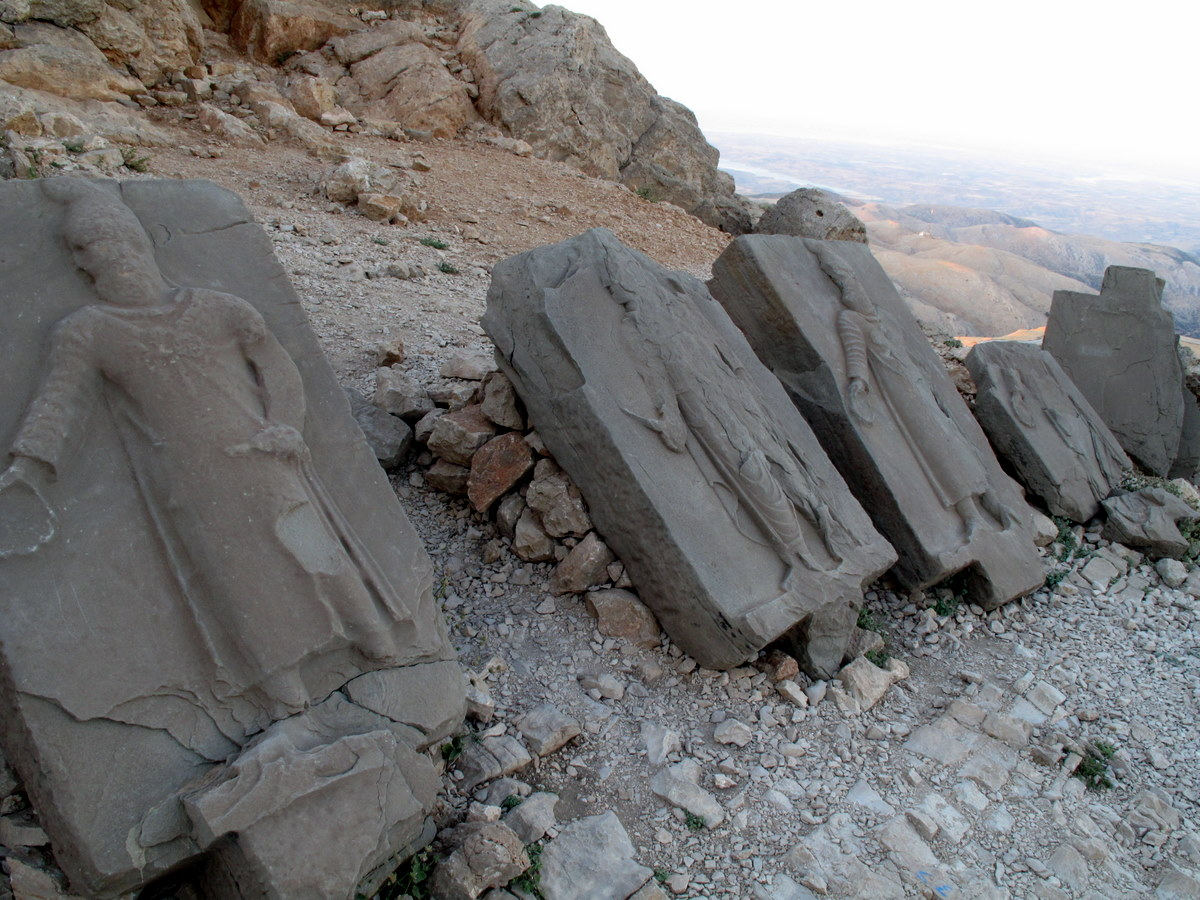
West terrace: Sandstone stele / stelae of Persian

== See also ==
- Cities of the ancient Near East
- List of megalithic sites
- List of colossal sculptures in situ
- Queen of the Mountain — 2005 documentary about the excavation of Mount Nemrut

== Sources ==
- Canepa, Matthew (2020). The Iranian Expanse: Transforming royal identity through architecture, landscape, and the built environment, 550 BCE – 642 CE. Oakland, CA: University of California Press. ISBN 9780520379206.
- Goell, Theresa (October 1957). "The Excavation of the "Hierothesion" of Antiochus I of Commagene on Nemrud Dagh (1953-1956)". Bulletin of the American Schools of Oriental Research. 147 (147). The University of Chicago Press: 4–22. doi:10.2307/1356011. JSTOR 1356011. S2CID 163611794.
- Goell, Theresa; Bachmann, H. G.; Sanders, Donald Hugo, eds. (1996). Nemrud Dagi: The hierothesion of Antiochus I of Commagene: Results of the American excavations directed by Theresa B. Goell. Vol. 1. Eisenbrauns. "The east and west terraces each contain colossal statues of Antiochus and his syncretized Greco-Persian tutelary deities, dozens of relief stelae portraying the Persian, Macedonian, and Commagenian ancestors of Antiochus"
- Hengel, Martin (1980). Jews, Greeks, and Barbarians: Aspects of the hellenization of Judaism in the pre-Christian period. Fortress. p. 73.
- Shayegan, M. Rahim (2016). "The Arsacids and Commagene". In Curtis, Vesta Sarkhosh; Pendleton, Elizabeth J.; Alram, Michael; Daryaee, Touraj (eds.). The Parthian and Early Sasanian Empires: Adaptation and expansion. Oxbow Books. ISBN 9781785702082.
- Spawforth, Antony; Eidinow, Esther; Hornblower, Simon, eds. (2014). The Oxford Companion to Classical Civilization. Oxford University Press. p. 542.
- Widengren, G. (1986). "Antiochus of Commagene". Encyclopaedia Iranica. Vol. II, Fasc. 2. pp. 135–136.
- Siliotti, Alberto (2006). Hidden Treasures of Antiquity. Vercelli: VMB. ISBN 88-540-0497-9.
- Young, John H. (January 1964). "Commagenian tiaras: Royal and divine". American Journal of Archaeology. 68 (1). Archaeological Institute of America: 29–34. doi:10.2307/501522. JSTOR 501522. S2CID 193017631.
- Brijder, Herman A.G., ed. (2014). Nemrud Dağı: Recent archaeological research and conservation activities in the tomb sanctuary on Mount Nemrud. Boston, MA / Berlin, DE: Walter de Gruyter. ISBN 978-1-61451-713-9.
