= Theresa Goell =

American archaeologist

- Born: July 17, 1901; New York City
- Died: December 18, 1985 (aged 84); New York City
- Education: B.A., Radcliffe College, 1923; B.A. architecture, Newnham College, Cambridge
- Known for: Excavations at Nemrud Dagh
- Spouse: Cyrus Levinthal
- Scientific career
- Fields: Archaeology

Theresa Bathsheba Goell (July 17, 1901 – December 18, 1985) was an American archaeologist, best known for directing excavations at Nemrud Dagh in south-eastern Turkey. Born in New York, she earned a BA at Radcliffe College, then graduated from Newnham College, Cambridge, and later studied at New York and Columbia Universities in New York.

Goell travelled to the Middle East in the 1930s, working with archaeologists in Jerusalem and Gerasa, before returning to New York. She returned to the Middle East after the Second World War, and in 1947 visited Nemrud Dagh for the first time; excavations there would become her life's work. Goell was involved in excavations at a number of other Middle Eastern sites over the course of her career, including at Tarsus and Samosata. Goell's work in Turkey "nearly single-handedly opened up ancient Commagene to the world".

== Early life and education ==
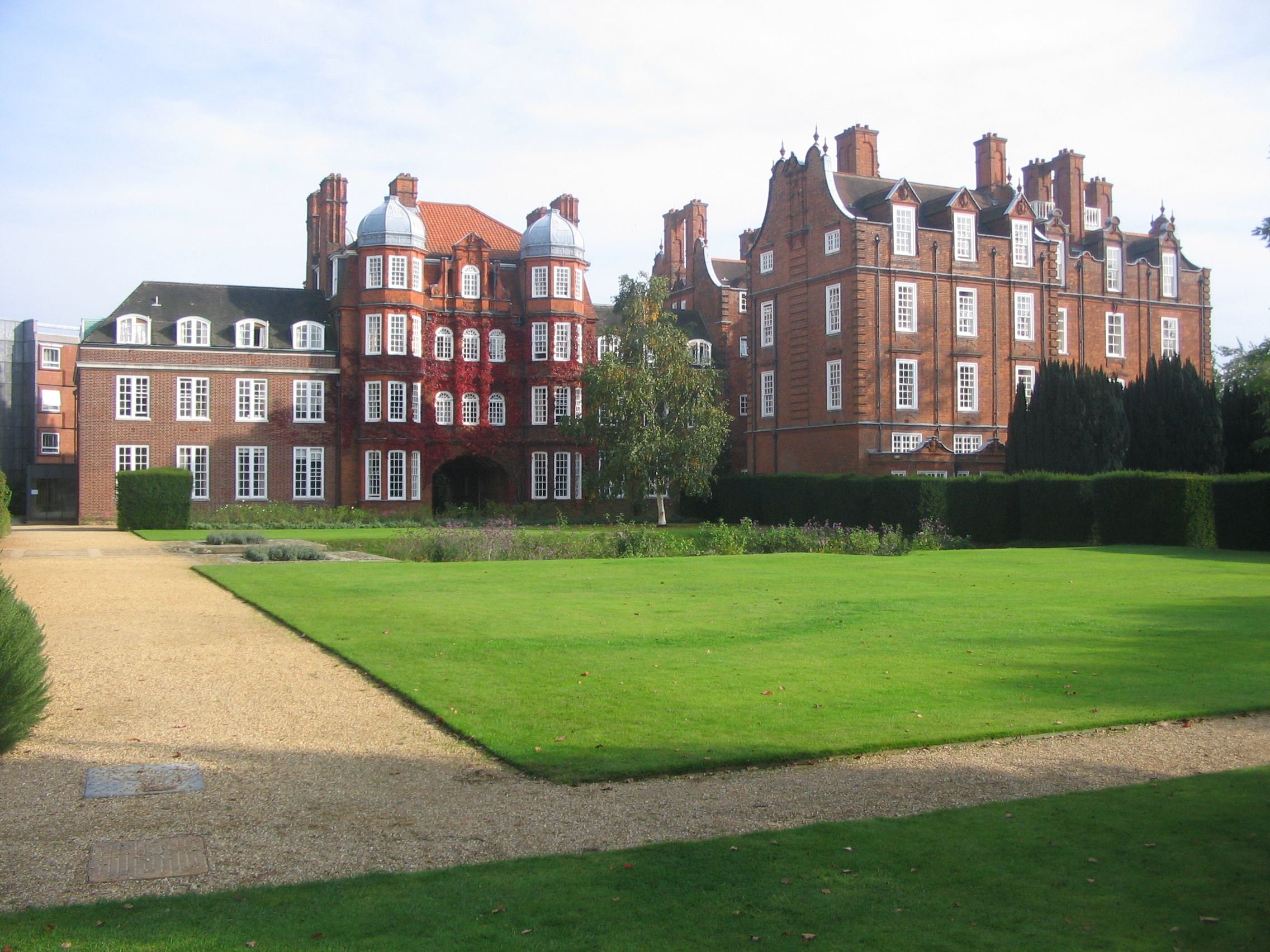
Newnham College, Cambridge

Theresa Goell was born in New York, (Note: Sanders and Gill say that Goell was born in Manhattan and the family moved to Brooklyn shortly after; both her obituary and Anita Gates say that she was born in Brooklyn.) on 17 July 1901. Her parents, Jacob and Mary Samowitz Goell, were middle-class Jews who had emigrated to the US from Russia. Goell was the second of three children; her sister, Eva, would with her husband Philip Godfrey financially support Goell's career, while her brother, Kermit, would go on to work on digs with her.

Goell was raised in Brooklyn and studied at Erasmus Hall High School; after graduation, she studied for two years at Syracuse University before moving to Radcliffe College, where she earned a B.A., majoring in philosophy and social ethics. While at Radcliffe, Goell met and married Cyrus Levinthal. Levinthal was the brother of the Goell family's rabbi and the match had been encouraged by Goell's father. While still studying at Radcliffe, Goell had a son, Jay. Also during her studies she began to lose her hearing due to otosclerosis and learned to lip-read in compensation.

In 1926, Goell and her husband both moved to England and enrolled at Cambridge University; Goell studied art history, architecture, and archaeology at Newnham College, and achieved the equivalent of a B.A. in architecture (it was not until 1948 that women were permitted to become full members of the university and be granted degrees).

== Early work ==
By 1932, Goell and Levinthal had divorced. In the spring of 1933, Goell went to Jerusalem and began to work for the American Schools of Oriental Research (ASOR), drawing pottery for William F. Albright and Aage Schmidt, and doing general drawing for William Stinespring. She continued to work under ASOR in Jerusalem in 1934, taking on more work from the expedition at Gerasa, including working on the reconstruction of finds from the dig. Goell's work in Palestine also included contemporary architecture, and she was involved in the design of more than 200 buildings in cities such as Tel Aviv, Haifa and Jerusalem. Goell's designs featured modernist styles resembling mansions in Brooklyn.

In 1935, Goell returned to New York, and began to study at the New York University School of Fine and Applied Arts, believing that improving her drawing skills was necessary for her continued career in archaeology. For two years she was unable to obtain any further work in the field, and worked as an architectural and window display designer for a department store in New York and New Jersey.

In 1938 she enrolled at the Institute of Fine Arts in New York University, studying for a master's degree with Karl Leo Heinrich Lehmann as her advisor. Her thesis was to be on the relationship between Palmyrene sculpture and the sculpture of the Roman near east. It was while studying there that Lehmann first suggested to Goell that she should explore Nemrud Dagh, the excavations of which were to become her life's work. Goell continued to study at the Institute for Fine Arts and at Columbia until 1945. During the Second World War, she also worked to contribute to the American war effort, working as a draftswoman for various engineering firms under contract to the US Navy, which interrupted her studies.

== Nemrud Dagh ==
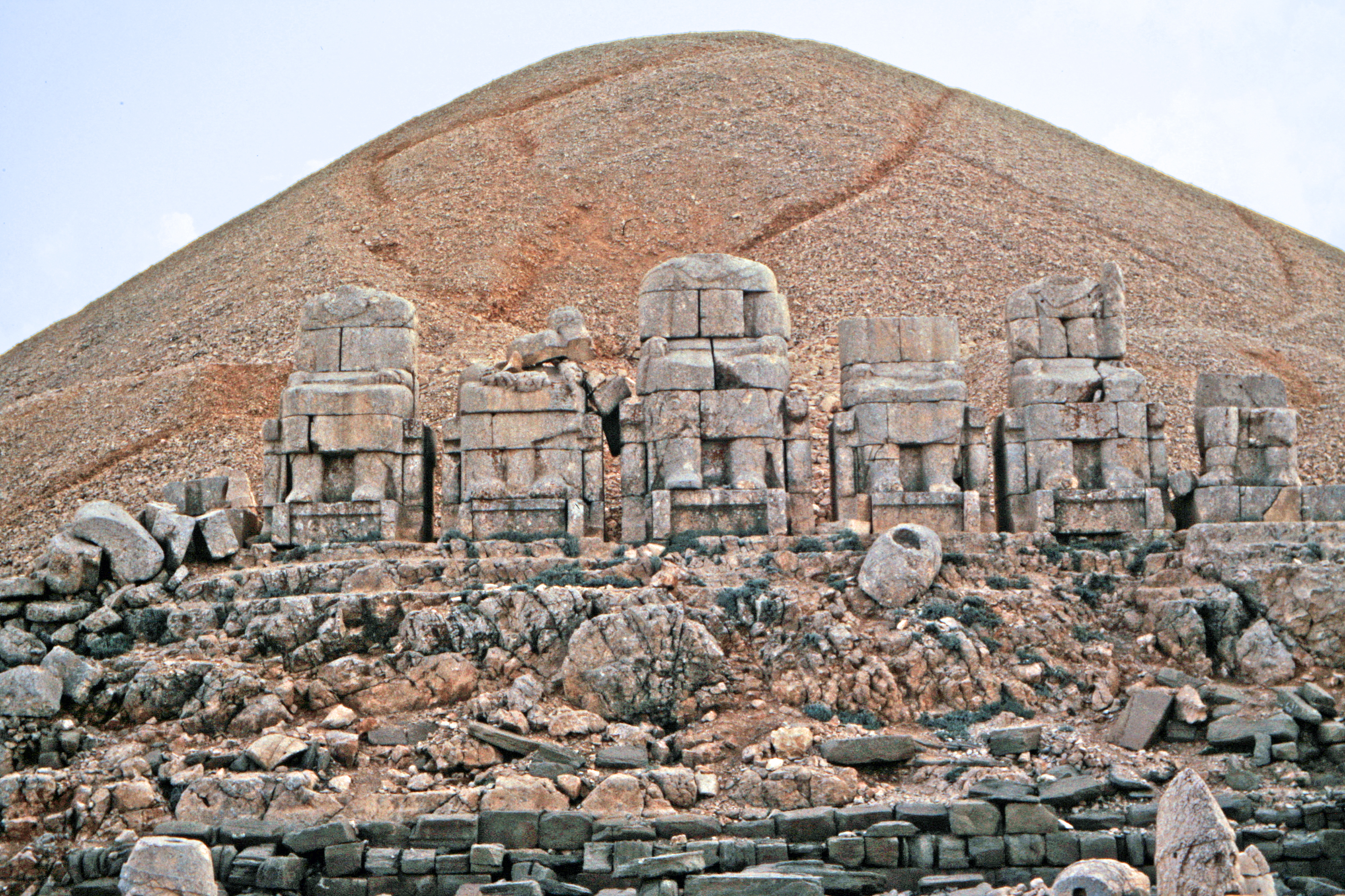
Nemrud Dagh, the site that became Goell's life's work

After the war, Goell travelled to Tarsus in southern Turkey, having been invited by Hetty Goldman; she spent the next few months working on the excavations there. She continued to work on the excavations at Tarsus until 1953, and due to Goldman's illness, ended up supervising the dig and overseeing the writing up of the results.

In the summer of 1947, when the excavations at Tarsus broke for the summer, Goell visited Nemrud Dagh for the first time. She described the state of the site on her first visit as "a complete shambles". In 1951, Goell returned to Nemrud Dagh, and began to arrange for an expedition there, hoping to be able to find and excavate the tomb of Antiochus I of Commagene. She discovered that Friedrich Karl Dörner was also planning an expedition there, and agreed to collaborate with him. In 1952, she began to raise funds and organise a team for an expedition; the American Philosophical Society agreed to sponsor the dig, and the Bollingen Foundation made a grant of $2,000. Dörner and Goell agreed that she would lead the excavation at the top of Nemrud Dagh, with his assistance as an epigrapher; Dörner would excavate the settlement of Arsameia-on-the-Nymphaios at the foot of the mountain, and Goell would assist.

1954 was the first full season of Goell's excavations at Nemrud Dagh. Though the excavations were planned to conclude in 1955, a $10,000 grant from the Bollingen Foundation, and the prospect of more work to be done, persuaded Goell to plan a 1956 season at the site. After a year away from the site, Goell returned and excavations resumed in 1958, though the work was hampered by the poor weather. Goell's excavations uncovered the colossal stone heads for which Nemrud Dagh is now famed.

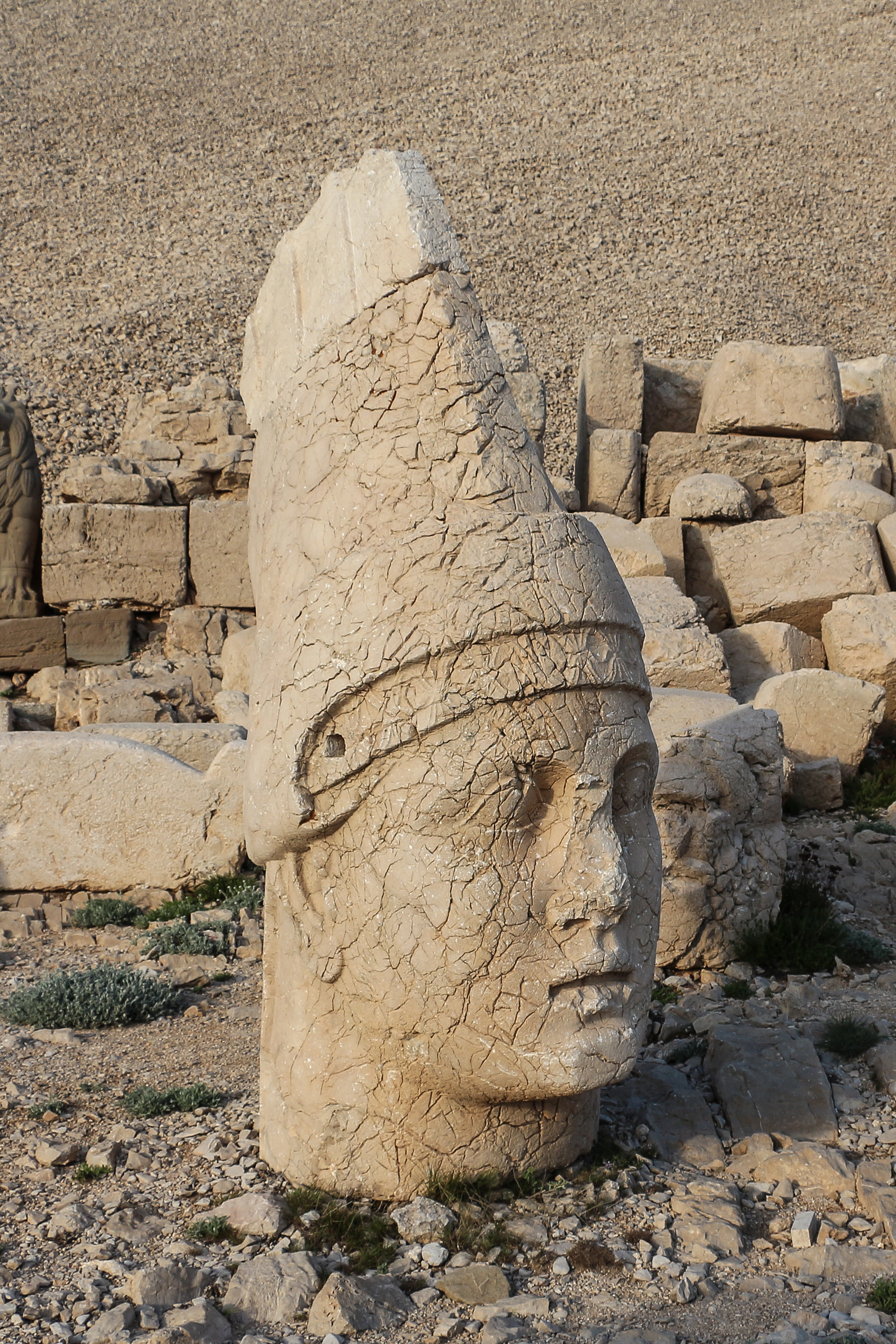
Head of Antiochus I of Commagene from Nemrud Dagh. Goell never discovered the tomb of Antiochus that she hoped to find at Nemrud Dagh.

In July 1960, Goell delivered a paper on the excavations at Nemrud Dagh to the Congress for Orientalists in Moscow, and the following year, a survey of her work was published in the National Geographic. She went on to lecture on her work at the University of London, and was elected a corresponding member of the German Archaeological Institute in Berlin. Goell returned to Nemrud Dagh in 1963 and began two years of geophysical probing of the site, hoping to find the tomb of Antiochus I of Commagene; these attempts were unsuccessful.

Goell's work at Nemrud Dagh shed new light on religious trends during the reign of Antiochus I (70 BC – 38 BC). At this period, the region's culture was affected by various traditions including Babylonian, Hellenistic and Anatolian cultures. Goell's excavations documented the influence of "salvation" mystery cults during this transitional period between paganism and Christianity.

== Samosata ==
In 1964, Goell turned her attention to the ancient city of Samosata, directing an investigation into the stratigraphy of the mound at the site, with 40 meters of archaeological deposits from thousands of years of occupation of the site; this was to be the first of three seasons she spent there. In 1965, she narrated a film about Nemrud Dagh for the National Geographical Society, and spent much of the rest of the year trying to finish the Nemrud Dagh expedition report. She remained in New York in 1966, working on material from Samosata as well as the Nemrud Dagh expedition report. In 1968, though William Albright encouraged Goell to publish the first volume of the Nemrud Dagh report, she did not, feeling that the contributions from Dörner and John Young (who was working on the sculpture from the site) were incomplete. In the same year, she traveled to Iran to work on comparative material for the Samosata excavations and to visit Persepolis.

== Later life ==
In February 1970, Goell was told that ASOR had set a one-year time limit for completing the Nemrud Dagh publication. Goell spent much of the next five years working on the manuscript of the report, though little progress was made. She did, however, manage to arrange with the Turkish Department of Antiquities for restoration works at Nemrud Dagh to begin. In 1973, Goell visited Nemrud Dagh for the final time.

In 1976, Goell's legs became paralysed while she was in Germany; she was found to have a tumour on her spine which required immediate surgery. She recovered first in the hospital in Münster, and then at her sister's house in Florida, before returning to New York. There, she prepared a report on the excavations at Samosata for the National Geographical Society, and planned new expeditions to Nemrud Dagh. In April 1978, doctors pronounced Goell well enough to return to Turkey, where she spent the second half of the year working.

Goell continued to work on the report on the excavations at Nemrud Dagh until she had a stroke in 1983. She did not complete the report in her lifetime, nor did she discover the tomb of King Antiochus. She died in New York City on 18 December 1985, after a long period of illness. Her papers were given to Harvard University by her brother Kermit, and are housed there in the Schlesinger Library and Semitic Museum. In 1990, Goell was posthumously awarded a master's degree in recognition of her work on Commagenian history. A two-volume excavation report on Nemrud Dagh, based on Goell's notes and drafts, was published in 1996, completed by Donald Sanders under the supervision of Kermit Goell and financed by Goell's sister Eva. A documentary about Goell's life, Queen of the Mountain, was produced in 2006.

== Works cited ==
- Cook, Joan (21 December 1985). "Theresa Goell, 84: Archeologist Known for Work in Turkey". The New York Times.
- Davey, Christopher J. (2013). "G.R.H. (Mick) Wright: A remarkable Australian archaeological architect". Journal of the Australian Institute of Archaeology. 49.
- Gates, Anita (25 March 2006). "Examining the Life of Tess Goell, a Pioneering Archaeologist". The New York Times.
- Mellink, Machteld J. (1978). "Archaeology in Asia Minor". American Journal of Archaeology. 82 (3): 315–338. doi:10.2307/504461. JSTOR 504461.
- Moormann, Eric M.; Versluys, Miguel John (2002). "The Nemrud Dağ Project: Third Interim Report" (PDF). Babesch. 80 (1).
- Moormann, Eric M.; Versluys, Miguel John (2005). "The Nemrud Dag Project: First Interim Report" (PDF). Babesch. 77.
- Moseley, Eva S. (2000). "Goell, Theresa Bathsheba". American National Biography. Oxford: Oxford University Press. doi:10.1093/anb/9780198606697.article.1401003. ISBN 978-0-19-860669-7.
- Sanders, Donald H.; Gill, David W. J. (2004). Cohen, Getzel M.; Joukowsky, Martha Sharp (eds.). Breaking Ground: Pioneering Women Archaeologists. Ann Arbor: University of Michigan Press. ISBN 978-0-472-11372-9.
- "Personal Information for Theresa Goell". Jewish Women's Archive. Archived from the original on 19 January 2012.
