= Unwanted Cinema =

- Directed by: Petrus van der Let and Armin Loacker
- Release date: 2005
- Running time: 60 min.
- Language: English

Unwanted Cinema is a documentary film by Petrus van der Let and Armin Loacker that looks at the lives and careers of Jewish filmmakers in Budapest and Vienna during the 1930s after Adolf Hitler came to power. Unwanted Cinema features Henry Koster, Felix Jackson, Joe Pasternak, Otto Wallburg, Hans Jaray, Franziska Gaal, Rosy Rarsony, Hortense Raky, Oskar Pilzer, Zolan Vidor, Ernst Verebes. The documentary shares clips from their films and interviews with their family.

== Synopsis ==
On his American debut, director Henry Koster stood in the lobby waiting to see if the audience would laugh at his film. If they laughed, he knew he could make a career for himself. If they didn't, he'd have to return to Europe, where he could be killed by the Nazis. The audience laughed uncontrollably. Unwanted Cinema profiles Koster and other Jews who were involved in the movie business before and during World War II, as they struggled to preserve both their careers and their lives.

Until the dawn of Hitler, Jewish actors and producers throughout Europe enjoyed critical acclaim and stardom. But once anti-Semitism began to spread, it threatened not only their celebrity but also their lives. Filmmakers and actors moved to Vienna and Budapest where their “unwanted cinema” was produced independently. Later, in hopes of escaping war-torn Europe, many Jews involved in cinema traveled to Hollywood to test their skills and their luck.

The documentary points to both the cruelty and irony of anti-Semitism. Talent that was “unwanted” in Europe because of prejudice was celebrated on the other side of the ocean. The charming clips interspersed throughout the documentary prove the injustice of rejecting Jewish talent. One Hundred Men and a Girl, which was nominated for five Oscars, is just one example of the exceptional films that these refugees were responsible for.

== See also ==
- Louis B. Mayer, King of Hollywood—another documentary about Jews in early Hollywood
