= Song of a Jewish Cowboy =

- Directed by: Bonnie Burt and Judith Montell
- Produced by: Bonnie Burt Productions
- Edited by: Bonnie Burt and Judith Montell
- Release date: 2002
- Running time: 18 minutes
- Country: United States
- Language: English

Song of a Jewish Cowboy is a 2002 documentary about Scott Gerber, a rancher and musician from Sonoma County, California, who sings cowboy music and Yiddish folk songs. The documentary shows clips from his performances and a personal interview with Scott.

== Summary ==
Scott's parents were socialist chicken ranchers who moved to Petaluma, California. Scott also went into chicken ranching and then dabbled in shearing sheep. He was instilled with a love of his Jewish heritage from his mother and grandmother, and sings many of the songs they taught him. Much of the documentary focuses on the perceptions of others to the differences between Scott's appearance and the music he sings.

== See also ==
- Jewish music
- Secular Jewish music
- A Home on the Range
- My Yiddishe Momme McCoy
- From Swastika to Jim Crow
- Professional Revolutionary
- Awake Zion
