= From Swastika to Jim Crow =

- Directed by: Lori Cheatle and Martin D. Toub
- Written by: Gabrielle Simon Edgcomb (book)
- Produced by: Steven Fischler and Joel Sucher
- Narrated by: Lucy Sante
- Release date: 2000
- Running time: 60 minutes
- Country: United States
- Language: English

From Swastika to Jim Crow is a 2000 documentary that explores the similarities between Nazism in Germany (the Swastika) and racism in the American south (Jim Crow). In 1939, the Nazi government expelled Jewish scholars from German universities. Many of them found teaching positions in Southern universities, where they sympathized with the plight of their African-American colleagues and students.

== Summary ==
The horrors of prejudice became a common thread that could bind these exiled Jewish professors with their black students and colleagues. The film pairs shocking archival footage of the KKK dressed in costume and carrying torches with footage of Nazi salutes and marching German soldiers to compare the barbarity of both ideologies. A picture of a lynching shows a mob of average white citizens standing around casually and looking up at the tree, while photographs of the Holocaust depict emaciated corpses piled on top of each other.

Showing the similarities between German antisemitism and Southern racism through a compilation of interviews, archival film footage, and photographs, From Swastika to Jim Crow shows that both African-American students and their Jewish professors were familiar with prejudice and felt isolated from European American southern society. Their common understanding bonded them together to create a safe haven of interracial, intellectual dialogue and friendship.

When Germany forced its Jewish intellectuals to flee, America embraced high-profile thinkers like Albert Einstein, but the vast majority of lesser-known Jewish intellectual refugees struggled in America. Not only were jobs scarce because of the Great Depression, but prevalent antisemitism and anti-German sentiments meant the decision to take teaching jobs in the South was not based on the prestige of the positions, but rather because African-American schools had the only slots available to these normally discriminated against German Jews.

These Jewish professors brought their proper German teaching style with them to America. They approached the classroom with strict formality, wearing full suits and insisting that students rise when answering questions. Although their students were not accustomed to being treated with such formality in the classroom, with time they grew fond of their professors' quirks.

In addition to developing relationships with African Americans, the Jewish professors often served as a bridge between the African-American and European-American communities. In one instance, a professor organized a dinner with both African-American and European-American families. He asked the African-American guests, who arrived first, to sit in every other chair, so that when the European American guests arrived they would be forced to interact with one another. The professor knew he could not force people to give up their prejudice, but he was committed to doing whatever he could to encourage tolerance.

Through these simple acts, the Jewish intellectuals planted seeds that developed into the Civil Rights Movement. By treating their African-American students with the respect and dignity they deserved, Jewish professors acted as catalysts for forward thinking that recognizes all citizens as equals.

== About the filmmakers ==
- Producers Steven Fischler and Joel Sucher have produced a number of award-winning documentary films based on historical, cultural and political topics. They have received the Guggenheim Fellowship in film, Emmy Awards, Cine Golden Eagles, and the John Grierson Award for Social Documentaries.
- Director Lori Cheatle's films have been produced by PBS, Lifetime Television, and Paramount Pictures. She has worked on a number of films, her most recent being, Dashiell Hammett: Detective Writer.
- Martin D. Toub has directed, photographed and edited for Pacific Street productions since 1986. Among other films, he worked on Martin Scorsese Directs (PBS 1991) and Oliver Stone: Inside/Out (BBC, 1993).

== Production ==
From Swastika to Jim Crow was inspired by a New York Times editorial. The letter writer was upset by the fact that antisemitic sentiment was being spouted by speech givers at Howard University and other predominantly African-American schools. The editorialist mentioned the book From Swastika to Jim Crow and lamented the past, when Jewish professors found refuge at Southern universities. The filmmakers were intrigued, bought the book, and began immediately planning their documentary.

== See also ==
- List of American films of 2000
- History of Jews in the United States
- History of antisemitism

=== Other films about Jews in America ===
- My Yiddishe Momme McCoy
- Awake Zion
- Professional Revolutionary
- Song of a Jewish Cowboy
- A Home on the Range
