= Echoes from a Ghost Minyan =

Echoes From A Ghost Minyan
- Directed by: Gustave Rosanio; Joseph Van Blunk
- Release date: 1998
- Running time: 47 min.
- Language: English

Echoes From A Ghost Minyan is a 1998 documentary film about the once vibrant Jewish community of South Philadelphia.

== Plot summary ==
On February 22, 1882, the S.S. Illinois docked at the foot of Federal Street on the Delaware River in South Philadelphia. Among the passengers on board were 225 European Jewish refugees, most of whom settled nearby. By the close of World War I, a little over 40 years later, South Philadelphia was home to over 100,000 Jewish immigrants, making it the second largest Jewish neighborhood in the United States. However, the thriving community didn't last long. Soon after World War II, the Jews began moving to other parts of the city and surrounding suburbs. By the beginning of the 21st century, the Jewish community of South Philadelphia had almost completely vanished.

Using a mix of interviews, archival photographs, home movies and present day footage, Echoes from a Ghost Minyan documents a once thriving neighborhood by illuminating the lives and perceptions of those who once lived, worked and worshipped there, including the filmmakers themselves.

== Filmmakers ==
Echoes From A Ghost Minyan was directed and produced By Joseph Van Blunk and Gustave Rosanio, and written and narrated by Joseph Van Blunk.

== See also ==
- A Home on the Range
- Island of Roses
