= Jews of Iran (film) =

2005 Dutch film by Ramin Farahani

- Directed by: Ramin Farahani
- Produced by: Ramin Farahani
- Edited by: Ramin Farahani and Hamidreza Fard
- Release date: 2005
- Running time: 52 min.
- Country: Netherlands
- Languages: Persian with English subtitles and narration

Jews of Iran is a 2005 documentary film by Iranian-Dutch filmmaker Ramin Farahani. The film examines the lives of Persian Jews living in Iran's predominantly Islamic society. Although they face discrimination, they choose to remain in their homes rather than leave the country.

The documentary was the first film to cover this subject, capturing both friendships among Muslims and Jews and the prejudices against the Jewish minority. Farahani states that Jews of Iran is meant to "help westerners correct their image" of the Middle East and allow them to "see the nuance’s and norms " within the culture.

== Background ==
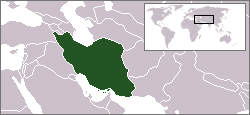
Iran

Although Jews have lived in Iran for 2,700 years, the 1979 Iranian Revolution pressured most Jews to leave the country. In modern Iran, rampant antisemitism continues to threaten the remaining citizens.

== Synopsis ==
Jews of Iran uses Middle Eastern music in its background. It offers shots of century-old architecture as the documentary travels through Tehran, Isfahan, and Shiraz.

A broad range of Jewish Iranians are interviewed: from an old woman in a hospital, to a computer science student. Muslim students are also interviewed; they explain they have no jewish friends due to Israeli politics or because Jews "don't mix" with Iranian Muslims.

The film also finds examples of religious tolerance, such as two women, one Jewish and the other Muslim, who have been friends since college. Their sons subsequently also became friends.

In Isfahan, Jewish artist Suleiman Sassoon explains how his work is strongly influenced by Iranian art and Islamic architecture. Pointing to his paintings, he explains how he naturally blends religious motifs, such as the Ten Commandments and David's prayer, with a traditional Iranian art style.

Finally, Farahani travels to Shiraz, where thirteen Jews have been accused of espionage. The evidence against them is circumstantial and built on extorted confessions, leading to the belief that the initial accusations were concocted. Nonetheless, they face death sentences, receiving 2-9 year prison terms.

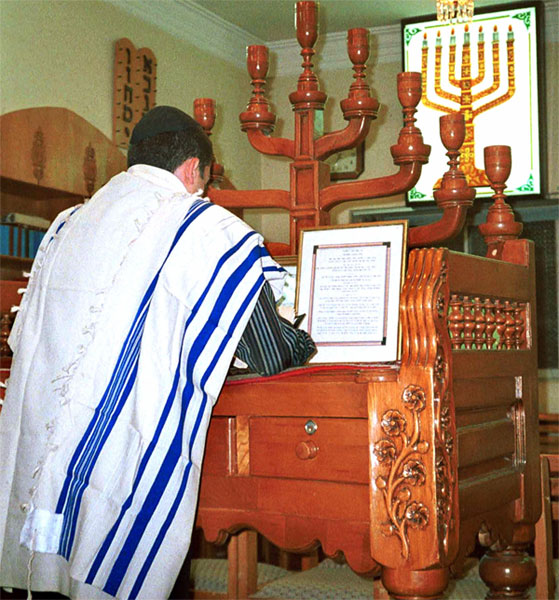
An Iranian Jew prays in a synagogue in Shiraz, Iran

== Reception ==
In an interview, Farahani said, "The reaction of Jews and Iranians outside was mainly emotional because they got more feeling with what we show in the film... I heard of wet eyes, nostalgic feelings for missing roots etc."

Harif of The Association of Jews from the Middle East and North Africa wrote that the film gives, "A rare glimpse into the lives of some of the 25,000 Jews still in Iran... and gives a remarkable insight into the official discrimination suffered by the Jews under the Islamic regime."

== Similar movies ==
- In Search of Happiness
- Reconstruction
- Next Year in Argentina
- Queen of the Mountain

== See also ==
- History of the Jews in Iran
- International Conference to Review the Global Vision of the Holocaust
- International Holocaust Cartoon Competition
- Iran–Israel relations
- Mahmoud Ahmadinejad and Israel
- Persian Jews
- Shiraz blood libel
