= Louis B. Mayer, King of Hollywood =

Louis B. Mayer: King of Hollywood (1999) is a documentary film directed by F. Whitman Trecartin that takes a look at life of filmmaker Louis B. Mayer, who as head of Metro-Goldwyn-Mayer (MGM) studios, came to rule over movie stars. The film takes a look at the personal price that Mayer paid for that success.

== Film summary ==
Few Jewish immigrants have wielded the cultural power of Louis B. Mayer, head of America's largest cinematic factory before the days of television. "I have abundant reason to cherish the blessings of our democracy and to resist with all my strength any effort to undermine it," Mayer said, as part of his testimony before the House Committee on Un-American Activities. This was one of the few existing recordings of Mayer's voice.

Mayer rarely emerged from behind the carefully constructed wall of his studio. That studio defined what many consider to be Hollywood’s "Golden Age". While he is often remembered as the all-powerful sculptor of silver screen glitz and glamour, this film shows Mayer in a far more personal, and often unflattering, light.

Through numerous photos and interviews with family and colleagues, we see the idiosyncrasies and insecurities of a very successful individual whose traditional family values drove the star system of Hollywood studios.

Born in Russia, but raised within the Jewish immigrant enclave of Saint John, New Brunswick, in Canada, Mayer grew up believing that the father figure was the indisputable head of any family. Later, as general manager of MGM, he often played this patriarchal role to the hilt in order to control the lives and careers of stars like Clark Gable, Joan Crawford, Spencer Tracy, and Judy Garland. Mayer’s protective watch included building influence among political, religious, and military figures, while also getting police and newspapers to turn a blind eye to any scandals.

"L.B. Mayer had some powerful friends," recalls his grandson, Daniel Mayer Selznick, son of David O. Selznick and Irene Mayer Selznick, "When they say he looked after and protected you, this was a long, wide protective arm. Some people loved it. Some people hated it."

Those who chafed the most were his daughters, Edith and Irene. Despite his efforts to hinder them from becoming involved in the movie business, they rebelled and married film producers. Studio success and a hefty paycheck that made him "America’s highest paid employee" had changed the family forever. This irony was not lost on Mayer's father Jacob, a lover of Talmudic lore, who had once supported the family as a peddler. "God has made you treasurer," the elder Mayer is said to have told his son. "Every family has one."

Maintaining his wealth was not as easy as viewers may have assumed. Mayer was only granted one-year contracts from MGM, with renewal based on his ability to judge the ever-changing tastes of the American viewing public. He was assisted by Irving Thalberg, a production specialist, whose intellectual leanings balanced Mayer's more populist tastes. Their collaboration helped produce the studio's most successful period.

Mayer's final years at MGM were not happy ones. His divorce from his invalid wife, Margaret, and subsequent pursuit of younger women, irrevocably harmed his relationship with his children. In his 70s, he became increasingly out of touch with his audience. He was eventually forced out as studio chief after three decades.

Despite all the turmoil, Louis B. Mayer has left a lasting legacy of MGM films. His greater achievement, however, may be that of a reminder to Jews and immigrants of the possibilities and the pitfalls that come with achieving the American dream.

== See also ==
- Classical Hollywood cinema
- Studio system
