= A Home on the Range =

A Home on the Range: The Jewish Chicken Ranchers of Petaluma
- Directed by: Bonnie Burt; Judith Montell
- Produced by: Bonnie Burt; Judith Montell
- Release date: 2002
- Running time: 52 minutes
- Country: United States
- Language: English

A Home on the Range: The Jewish Chicken Ranchers of Petaluma is a 2002 documentary by Bonnie Burt and Judith Montell about a group of Jews who fled pogroms in Eastern Europe and into prejudice in America. The group then organized a socialist society in the rural Northern California town of Petaluma and raised chickens to support themselves.

== Summary ==
A Home on the Range uses old photographs, archival color footage of the idealistic society that once existed in Petaluma and features interviews from former residents. The film reconstructs the daily life in Petaluma and highlights the daily mix of farm work and intellectual activities. United by their culture, the Jews of Petaluma cared for one another as extended family and survived antisemitism pre-World War II and anticommunist sentiments of the McCarthy era. With time, the community dwindled, and today their chicken ranches have been replaced by telecommunication facilities, dairy farms and vineyards.

The film demonstrates that for many of the Jews living in Petaluma, Judaism was more of a culture than a religion. It includes an account of a former resident saying that people kept the holidays for the social attachment, and another stating: “Judaism—there wasn't any!”. Burt and Montell show that, for the farmers of Petaluma, Judaism meant less about God and more about speaking Yiddish, eating matzah, and forming a kibbutz. But most of all, it meant they were outsiders to American society because they were often called rude names, discriminated against, and even attacked. As one woman in the film remembers, “they used to call us dirty Jews.” Another woman remembers a particularly frightening night when an antisemitic neighbor threw a barn party and the drunk and rowdy crowd terrified her parents so much that they couldn't sleep that night. There is also an incident when non-Jewish leaders of a neighboring community acted out their antisemitism and anti-communist by attacking some of the men of Petaluma.

The film shows that, after several generations of life in Petaluma, Jewish Americans were no longer persecuted. They assimilated into society, and the vibrant community of chicken ranchers in Petaluma dwindled. One former resident who grew up on a ranch and raised her children on a ranch expresses her mixed feelings about assimilation in the film. She pines for “the core” sense of community attachment that she used to feel, but in exchange admits that she and her neighbors “were fully accepted as Americans.”

== Production ==
Co-director Bonnie Burt has been making documentaries about Jewish life since the 1990s. Her films have screened at the Museum of Modern Art and at the Lincoln Center in New York. In 1992, she teamed up with Judy Montell to produce A Home on the Range.

== Reception ==
The San Diego Jewish Film Festival called A Home on the Range a modest film that "reads almost like an epic myth."

== See also ==
Other Documentaries about Jews in America:

- My Yiddish Momme McCoy
- Awake Zion
- From Swastika to Jim Crow
- Professional Revolutionary
- Song of a Jewish Cowboy

More information on Jewish communes:

- Kibbutz
- Moshav
- Socialism
- Israel
