= Balancing Acts =

- Written by: Donna Schatz
- Directed by: Donna Schatz
- Theme music composer: Gary Tong
- Country of origin: United States
- Original language: English

Production
- Cinematography: Donna Schatz
- Editor: David Vinson

Original release
- Release: 2005

Balancing Acts is a 2005 documentary film by Donna Schatz that chronicles the lives of Chinese acrobat Man-Fong Tong and his wife Magda Schweitzer, a Jewish acrobat from Budapest, Hungary. The two met in Europe on the eve of World War II. They were both at the peak of their careers, performing at the Moulin Rouge and Cirque Medrano, and alongside acts such as Maurice Chevalier and Bill 'Bojangles' Robinson. While their careers were full of success, the spread of Nazism brought them great hardships. Their marriage saw the trials of wartime Europe, post-war poverty, the birth of two sons, and a difficult ten-year separation from one another.

== Summary ==
Director Donna Schatz's Balancing Acts pairs archival footage and photographs of Magda Schweitzer and Man-Fong Tong's acts with private home videos and interviews to tell their life stories. Magda and Man-Fong both left their families at age sixteen to pursue careers in show business. While tenacious Magda and her partner Joe Mady - who was at least a foot taller - came up with a slapstick routine, Man-Fong teamed up with two other male acrobats, and, dressed in sharp suits with slicked back hair, the three performed their unique balancing act without ever breaking a sweat.

Magda and Man-Fong traveled with their acts throughout Europe. Magda was in Africa, too, and both entertained in the US. In the 1950s in the United States, Tong performed on The Ed Sullivan Show an unprecedented five times. Magda bragged that her act was the answer to the clue "best European act" in a Viennese crossword puzzle.

They married in Stockholm in 1940. Only three months later, Man-Fong, in Germany for the last time, was invited to perform for a private audience of top-ranking Nazi officials, including Adolf Hitler. Although he tried to refuse, he had little choice but to reluctantly comply.

During World War II, Magda and Man-Fong's commitment to one another kept them secure and grounded. When the ever-increasing grip of Nazism in many parts of Europe made both travel and work impossible for Jews, they returned to unoccupied Hungary where Magda took up the unglamorous role of a housewife, while Man-Fong continued to work and provide for the family. Later, Man-Fong had to leave his wife and two young boys in order to find work, first in the Middle East, then in Europe and the United States.

The couple always stayed true to show business. "I think Mom and Dad have always been, to some extent, competitive because they've been used to being in the limelight and used to the applause," the couple's son explains. "If dad was putting together an act or doing a show, mom wanted to get into the act too—and get attention."

== See also ==
- List of American films of 2005
