= Awake Zion =

- Directed by: Monica Haim
- Release date: 2005
- Running time: 60 min.
- Languages: English, Hebrew and Iyaric

Awake Zion is a 2005 documentary by Monica Haim that explores the connection between Jews and Rastafarians.

== Synopsis ==
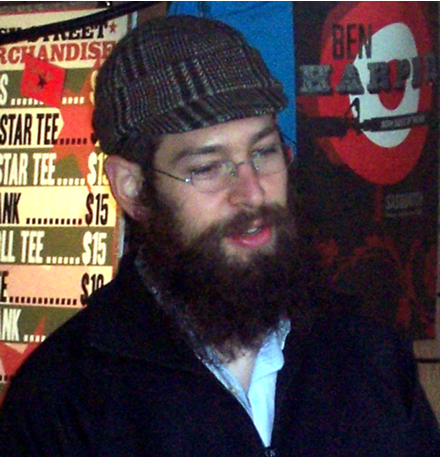
Matisyahu, a Jewish reggae singer.

In Awake Zion, Haim travels from Manhattan to Jamaica and Israel, interviewing Rastafarians and rabbis to highlight similarities between their worldviews. Haim, a young Jewish woman, says she first perceived a connection between Jews and Rastafarians at a reggae concert.

Haim interviews Super Dane, an African American DJ in the Brooklyn reggae scene, who is shocked by Matisyahu, a Hasidic reggae artist from White Plains, New York. The film also features Jamaican-born Israeli rapper Yehoshua Sofer.

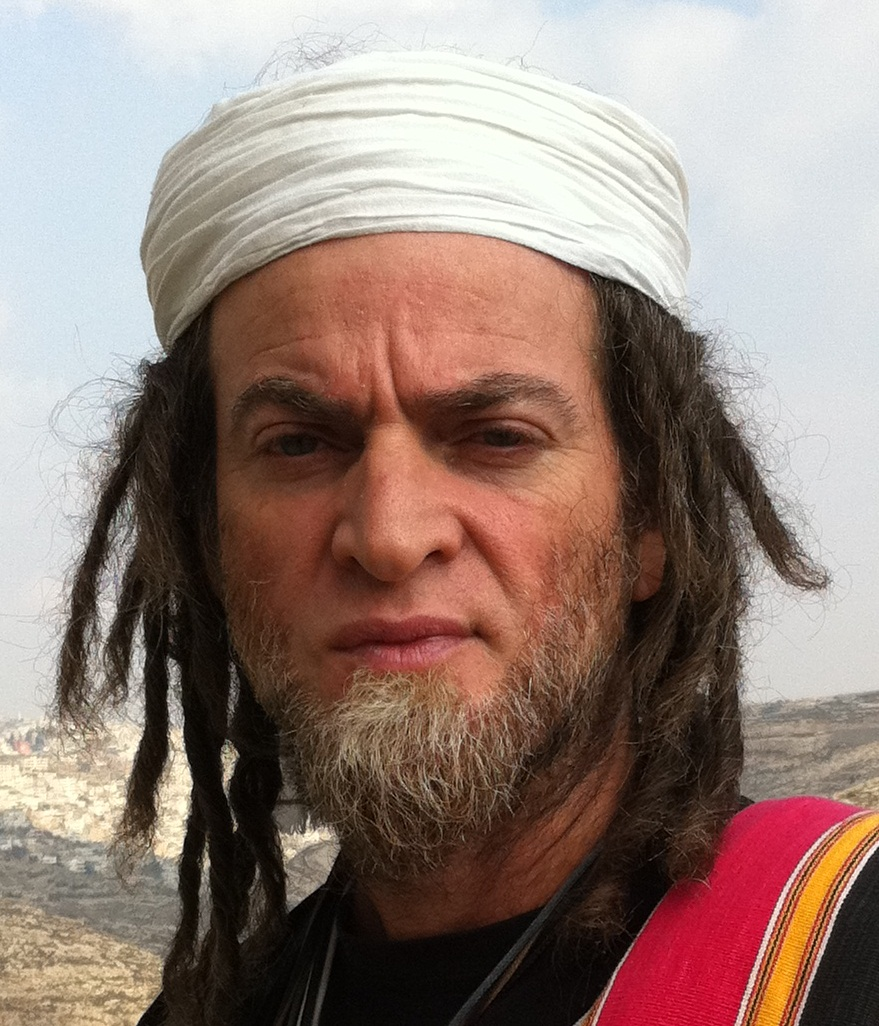
Yehoshua Sofer in 2011

== Response ==
Most reviews of Awake Zion emphasize the documentary's social conscience in trying to bridge a gap between two seemingly different cultures. Rather than being scholarly, Haim's tone is described as "gently irreverent".

== See also ==
- History of the Jews in Jamaica
- History of the Jews in Morocco
- History of the Jews in South Africa
