= Sigmund Abeles =

American printmaker and sculptor (1934–2025)

Sigmund Abeles (November 6, 1934 – December 21, 2025) was an American figurative artist and art educator. His work embodies the "expressive and psychological aspects of the human figure; an art focused on the life cycle." He taught art for 27 years at various institutions including Swain School of Design, Wellesley College, Boston University, the National Academy, and the Art Students League of New York. He was Professor Emeritus at the University of New Hampshire, and worked full-time in his NYC and upstate NY studios.

Abeles was the recipient of numerous grants and awards for printmaking, drawing, painting, and sculpture, including Pastel Society of America Hall of Fame honoree in 2004 and most recently the Artists' Fellowship 2017 Benjamin West Clinedinst Medal. His work can be found in many public institutions including the Museum of Fine Arts, Boston, Art Institute of Chicago, Metropolitan Museum of Art, Philadelphia Museum of Art, and the Whitney Museum of American Art. Abeles was one of three artists featured in Manfred Kirchheimer's 2012 feature-length independent film Art Is... The Permanent Revolution, on the history of the art of protest in prints.

== Life and career ==
Born in Brooklyn, New York, on November 6, 1934, Abeles grew up in Myrtle Beach, South Carolina. The only child of Samuel and Henrietta Abeles, he was named after his grandfather, a renowned Orthodox Rabbi who immigrated to the United States from Hungary in 1901. His father, a Hungarian Jew, was a decorated World War I veteran who used his pension to open up a retail business in Sheepshead Bay. His mother was of Polish-Jewish descent and worked as a librarian before her marriage. After his parents divorced early on in his life, he moved to Myrtle Beach with his mother where she started a new life by opening up a rooming house called Paul's Guest House on US Highway 17. Spending a great deal of time alone in the rooming house, Sigmund grew a fascination for how many types of people occupy the same domain which had a huge impact and direction on his artwork took. Sigmund Abeles received no formal art training in the public schools at Myrtle Beach. Searching for inspiration, Abeles found Brookgreen Gardens, an outdoor sculpture park, which provided him with a multitude of beautiful bronze and marble figures to sketch; years later, as an established artist, he had his life-sized bronze sculpture, " Kaethe, age 9" (modeled in 1968 and later cast in Bronze in 2006), placed in Brookgreen's permanent collection. Abeles was invited later to hold a major solo exhibition there in 2015 called "Carolina Roots".Shortly after graduating, Abeles was drafted into the army in 1957. He was posted to Heidelberg, Germany where he worked as a technical illustrator in a cartography workshop at the US Headquarters Army where he made charts and maps for top secret nuclear war plans. There he rented a house off base in nearby Neckargemünd that belonged to a sculptor. It was here he developed a renewed interest in creating sculptures. After serving two years in the army, he was discharged in Europe and spent the next year touring Italy, Greece and Israel with his then first wife, Gina Godwin. They raised two children, David Paul and Shoshanna Lynn upon coming back to the US.

During his high school years, Sigmund was mentored by Truman Moore Sr., a wood sculptor, who pointed him towards the Boston artist Gerard Francis Tempest whom he later apprenticed with. Abeles attended the University of South Carolina, initially for pre-medical studies to appease his mother but he later switched to art studies. There he met Jasper Johns, an upper classman and became long term acquaintances. They shared the same art professors, Edmund Yaghijian and Catharine Rembert. In 1952, Abeles attended Pratt Institute in Brooklyn for only one semester because his mother would only allow him to study commercial art. In the summer of 1954, determined to pursue his love for fine arts and figurative study, he attended the Art Students League of New York where he was taught by Reginald Marsh, Morris Kantor and Harry Sternberg. In 1955, he received a scholarship to the Skowhegan School of Painting and Sculpture in Maine. He worked under Edwin Dickinson and Isabel Bishop. There he also made lifelong friendships with fellow students Sidney Hurwitz, Philip Grausman, Jerome Witkin and Ashley Bryan. In 1957, he received another scholarship to study at Columbia University where he received his MFA in Painting in just one year. Shortly after graduating, Abeles was drafted into the army in 1957. He was posted to Heidelberg, Germany where he worked as a technical illustrator in a cartography workshop at the US Headquarters Army where he made charts and maps for top secret nuclear war plans. There he rented a house off base in nearby Neckargemünd that belonged to a sculptor. It was here he developed a renewed interest in creating sculptures. After serving two years in the army, he was discharged in Europe and spent the next year touring Italy, Greece and Israel with his then first wife, Gina Godwin. They raised two children, David Paul and Shoshanna Lynn upon coming back to the US. In 1960, Abeles returned to Columbia, South Carolina, and found himself without a job. He briefly taught adults at a local community art center until a position opened up at the Swain School of Design in New Bedford, Massachusetts, recommended to him. It was his first full time teaching job, which was to last three years. The year 1965 was Abeles' strongest New York art world year as a recognized artist there. He was included in that year’s Whitney Annual which was devoted to his prints and sculpture. Then the Museum of Modern Art bought his etching “ Self Portrait with Cats”. That was the only time both his estranged parents attended an art event he was included in. That same year, the National Institute of Arts and Letters awarded Abeles a grant and honor. His early anti war work in drypoint and etching was introduced there by Lewis Mumford. From 1964 to 1969, he was resident artist at Wellesley College which, despite not offering a studio art major at the time, had some of the brightest students the artist recalls having taught. In 1967, Abeles was awarded a sabbatical grant from teaching at Wellesley College by the newly founded National Council of Arts and Humanities which is now called the National Endowment for the Arts. He spent that year making large anti Vietnam war color prints as well as a body of terra cotta sculptures from the figure. In his first 20 years as an artist, Abeles mostly worked in black and white etchings, drawings and sculpture. Color was reintroduced into his works when he discovered pastel which was an extension of his drawings beginning in 1979.

Abeles died on December 21, 2025, at the age of 91.

== Publications ==
- Ronald L. Ruble, The Print Renaissance in America—A Revolution (2015) ISBN 978-0-9861109-1-7
- Frye Art Museum, The Perception of Appearance. A Decade of Contemporary American Figure Drawing (2002) ISBN 0-295-98282-9
- Smithsonian Institution, National Portrait Gallery, American Portrait Drawings (1980)
- Matthew Baigell, Jewish Art in America—An Introduction (2007). Rowman & Littlefield Publishers Inc.
- James A. Haught, The Art of Love Making, An Illustrated Tribute (1992). Prometheus Books. ISBN 0-87975-740-X
- David Acton, 60 Years of North American Prints 1947–2007 (2007). The Boston Printmakers. ISBN 0-615-31236-5
- Dan Gheno, Figure Drawing Master Class (2015). Dan Gheno published by North Light Books.
- Face to Face: Artists' Self Portraits from the Collection of Jackye and Curtis Finch, Jr. Catalog 2013, Arkansas Arts Center
- Yellow Silk: Erotic Arts and Letters, ed. Lily Pond and Richard Russo (1991). Harmony Books. ISBN 0-517-57752-6
- Mirrors & Masks: Reflections and Constructions of the Self (2017). Bryn Mawr College
- Jack A. Morris, Jr (text)/Robert Smeltzer (photography) "Contemporary Artists of South Carolina" (1970) ISBN 978-0910326070

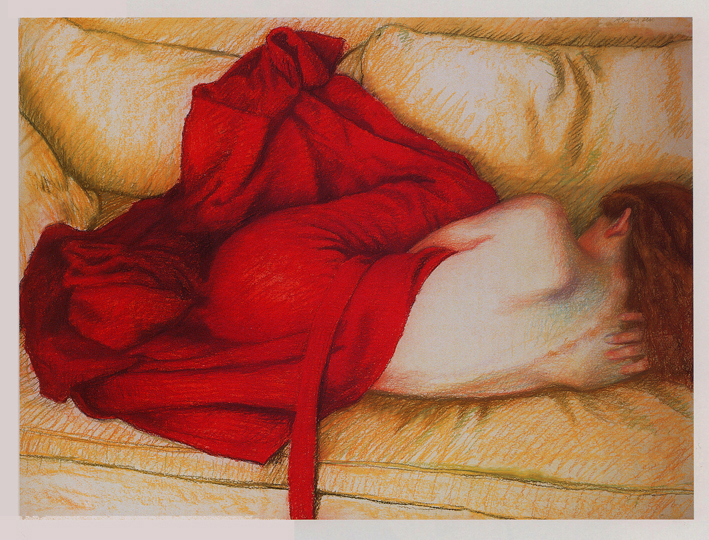
Mireille Light Back/Red Robe 2000

"Gift of America Series: Napalm 1967, Color Etching

== Solo exhibitions ==
- "Century Master: Sigmund Abeles" The Century Association, NYC, 2019. Solo retrospective exhibition comprising 90 of Sigmund Abeles works.
- Carolina Roots: Sigmund Abeles, Brookgreen Gardens, Murrells Inlet, SC, 2015
- From Whence I've Come, Franklin G. Burroughs-Simeon B. Chapin Art Museum, Myrtle Beach, SC, 2007
- Sigmund Abeles: Things to Come, Burroughs/Chapin Art Museum, Myrtle Beach, SC, 1999
- ABELES, Recent Pastels, Drawings & Print Survey, Thomas Williams Fine Arts, London, UK, catalog, 2000
- Print Retrospective, Bates College Museum of Art, Lewiston, ME, catalog w/complete print listing, 1999
- The Observant Hand, 40 Years of Drawing by Sigmund Abeles, Pollock Gallery, Southern Methodist University, Dallas, TX, 1998
- A 30-Year Retrospective of Drawings & Prints from the Collection of the Boston Public Library, 1993
- Sigmund Abeles, The Old Print Shop, New York City, 2008
