= Rembert =

Rembert may refer to:

== People ==
- Catharine Rembert (1905–1990), American artist
- Reggie Rembert (born 1966), American football player
- Winfred Rembert (1945–2021), African-American artist
- Rembert Weakland (1927-2022), American Roman Catholic prelate

== Places ==
=== United States ===
- Rembert, Alabama
- Rembert, Missouri
- Rembert, South Carolina

== Other uses ==
- A variant spelling of Rimbert, a 9th-century German Roman Catholic bishop
