= Kirchheimer =

Kirchheimer is a surname of German or Yiddish origin. the suffix means from/of in either language. "Kirch" refers to the German word for church. "Heimer" in either language refers to home. It is a last name found among Ashkenazi Jews. Kirschheim is a known variant.

Notable people with the surname include:

- Otto Kirchheimer (1905–1965), German jurist of Jewish ancestry
- Manfred Kirchheimer (born 1931), German-American filmmaker and professor
- Sid Kirchheimer (born 1958), American author
- Strong Kirchheimer (born 1995), American tennis player
