= Mark Sloan (curator) =

American artist and museum director

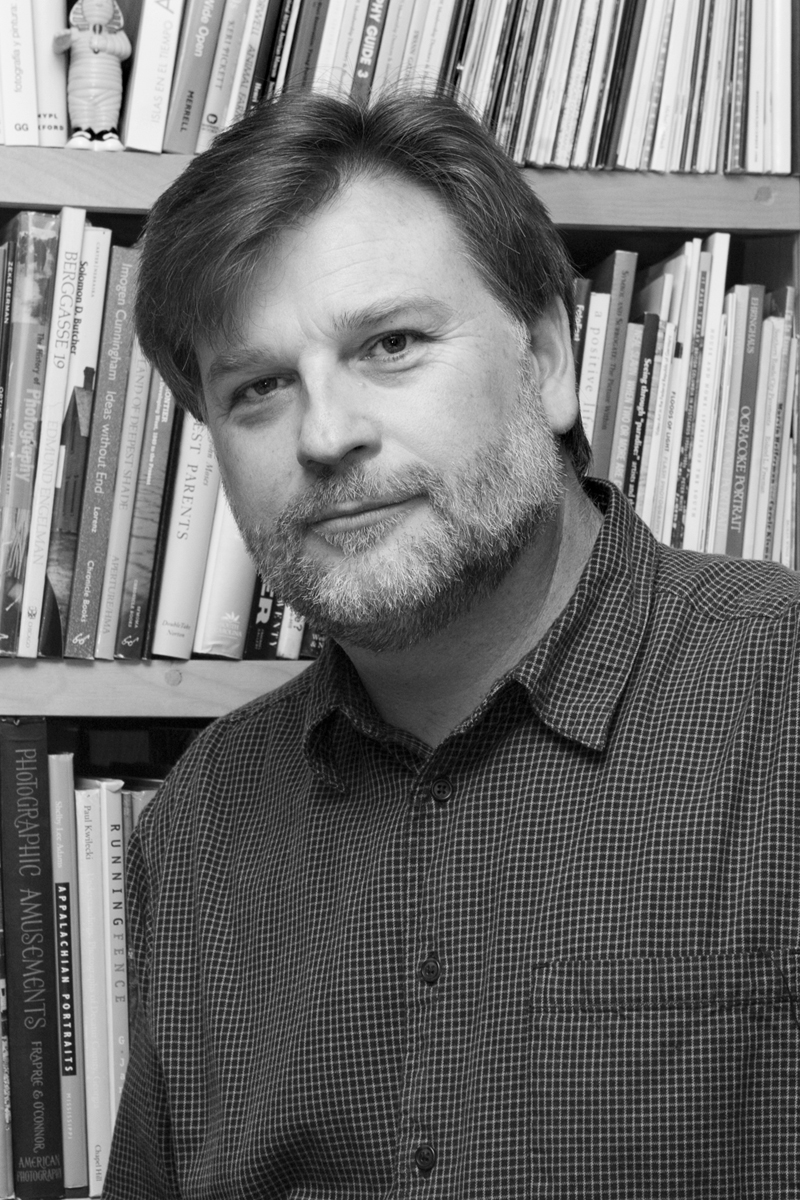
Mark Sloan

Mark Sloan (born 1957) is an American curator, author, editor, museum director, and photographer. He served as director and chief curator of the Halsey Institute of Contemporary Art at the College of Charleston from 1994 through 2020. Since leaving the Halsey Institute, he has worked as an independent curator and publishing consultant.

== Early life and education ==
Mark Sloan was born in Durham, North Carolina, and grew up in Chapel Hill, North Carolina. He received his B.A. in Interdisciplinary Studies from the University of Richmond (1980) and a Master of Fine Arts degree from Virginia Commonwealth University (1984).

== Curatorial career ==
Sloan served as executive director of The Light Factory in Charlotte, North Carolina (1985–86); associate director of San Francisco Camerawork in California (1986–89); and director of the Roland Gibson Gallery at the State University of New York at Potsdam (1992–1994).

In 1994, Sloan became director and chief curator of the Halsey Institute of Contemporary Art at the College of Charleston School of the Arts in Charleston, South Carolina which he held until 2020. During his 26-year tenure, Sloan has produced several hundred exhibitions, highlighting emerging, mid-career, and established contemporary artists including Lonnie Holley, Renée Stout, Fahamu Pecou, Shepard Fairey, and Jasper Johns. These exhibitions, with their attendant publications, videos, and other documentation have increased the visibility of emerging and mid-career artists to the point that artists Motoi Yamamoto, Aldwyth, and Colin Quashie credit Sloan for being pivotal in the development of their careers. Additionally, Sloan organized thematic exhibitions including Self-Made Worlds: Visionary Folk Art Environments; The Right to Assemble; Hair on Fire; and, with Mark Long, Southbound: Photographs of and about the New South.

As director, Sloan oversaw the institute’s exhibition, publication, visiting-artist, educational, and fundraising programs. Besides curating 245 exhibitions and raising $6 million in support for the Halsey, he also taught museums studies and directed an internship program Many of these students would later hold positions at museums and arts organizations including the Metropolitan Museum of Art, the National Gallery of Art, and the High Museum of Art. With the Pulse Dome Project: Art and Design by Don Zanfanga exhibition, Sloan served as one of the panelists for the Bio-Logical Architecture: Past, Present, and Future symposium that was held in tandem to the exhibition to discuss eco-bio-architecture.

== Independent Work ==
After leaving the Halsey Institute, Sloan established Curioso, an independent curatorial and publishing practice based in North Carolina. Sloan has worked as a guest curator at the Greenville County Museum of Art, organizing exhibitions and accompanying publications. His subsequent projects have included This Is Not: Aldwyth in Retrospect; Bob Ray: Suit Yourself; At This Moment: Portraits of South Carolina Artists by Jerry Siegel; and Original Fake Ray Johnson Collages by Richard C.

In 2026, Sloan guest-curated The Art Underground: Fantasy Coffins of Ghana for the Museum of International Folk Art in Santa Fe, New Mexico. Organized in collaboration with Ghanaian coffin maker Eric Adjetey Anang, the exhibition traces the history and continuing development of figurative coffins associated with the Kane Kwei, Paa Joe, and Hello workshops. Sloan edited the accompanying book and, with Ghanaian photographer Yao Ladzekpo, provided its principal photography.

== Photography and Publications ==
Sloan is also a photographer, author, and editor. His photographs have been exhibited at the Grand Palais in Paris; the Photographic Resource Center at Boston University; Southeastern Center for Contemporary Art in Winston-Salem, North Carolina; and the Harvard Museum of Natural History. His assemblage photographs appear in Rarest of the Rare: Stories Behind the Treasures at the Harvard Museum of Natural History, written by Nancy Pick with a foreword by E.O. Wilson. The book was reviewed by NPR and selected by Discover magazine as one of the top science books of 2004. The project and Sloan's photographs were featured by Wired in conjunction with an exhibit at National Academy of Sciences in Washington, D.C. The photographs were later published in Atlas Obscura.

Sloan has written and edited books on contemporary art, photography, natural history, vernacular art, and circus and sideshow history. Sara Gruen credits his book Wild, Weird, and Wonderful as inspiration for her novel Water for Elephants. Costumes and backgrounds for the 2010 film came from the book as well. Choreographer Twyla Tharp used Wild, Weird, and Wonderful as inspiration for the sets and costumes of her Broadway production of the musical The Times They Are a-Changin'.

== Awards ==
In 2012, the Halsey Institute of Contemporary Art received the Elizabeth O'Neill Verner Governors Award for the Arts, with special recognition given to Mark Sloan .

== Publication Awards ==
List of awarded publications edited or co-edited by Sloan.

Year	Award	Publication	Organization
2019	Alice Award	Southbound: Photographs of and about the New South	Furthermore program of the J. M. Kaplan Fund
2019	Second Prize, Exhibition Catalogues	Southbound: Photographs of and about the New South	American Alliance of Museums Museum Publications Design Competition
2017	Honorable Mention, Exhibition Catalogues	Sons & Father: Engravings by John McWilliams	American Alliance of Museums Museum Publications Design Competition
2017	Honorable Mention, Exhibition Catalogues	Jiha Moon: Double Welcome, Most Everyone’s Mad Here	American Alliance of Museums Museum Publications Design Competition
2016	Second Prize, Books	Something to Take My Place: The Art of Lonnie Holley	American Alliance of Museums Museum Publications Design Competition
2017	Honorable Mention, Exhibition Catalogues	Renée Stout: Tales of the Conjure Woman	American Alliance of Museums Museum Publications Design Competition
2013	First Prize, Exhibition Catalogues	Aggie Zed: Keeper’s Keep	American Alliance of Museums Museum Publications Design Competition
2013	Second Prize, Exhibition Catalogues	Return to the Sea: Saltworks by Motoi Yamamoto	American Alliance of Museums Museum Publications Design Competition
2009	Honorable Mention, Exhibition Catalogues	Aldwyth: Work v. / Work n.—Collage and Assemblage 1991–2009	American Alliance of Museums Museum Publications Design Competition
2009	Mary Ellen LoPresti Art Publication Award	Aldwyth: Work v. / Work n.—Collage and Assemblage 1991–2009	Art Libraries Society of North America Southeast Chapter
2007	Mary Ellen LoPresti Art Publication Award	Force of Nature: Site Installations by Ten Japanese Artists	Art Libraries Society of North America Southeast Chapter

== Selected Books ==
- (2026) The Art Underground: Fantasy Coffins of Ghana. Edited and with an essay by Mark Sloan. Essays by Nii Otokunor Quarcoopome and Roberta Bonetti; an essay by Steven Feld with Nii Yemo Nunu; profile by John Owoo. Principal photography by Yao Ladzekpo and Mark Sloan. Eric Adjetey Anang, lead cultural and content advisor. Santa Fe, New Mexico: Museum of New Mexico Press. ISBN 978-0-89013-605-8.
- (2026) Original Fake Ray Johnson Collages by Richard C. Edited by Mark Sloan, with essays by Mark Sloan and Huston Paschal. Greenville, South Carolina: Greenville County Museum of Art. ISBN 978-0-9974309-9-8.
- (2025) At This Moment, Portraits of South Carolina Artists by Jerry Siegel. Edited by Mark Sloan, with an essay by Eleanor Heartney. Greenville, South Carolina: Greenville County Museum of Art. ISBN 978-0-9974309-8-1.
- (2025) Bob Ray: Suit Yourself. Edited by Mark Sloan, with an essay by Mark Sloan and ekphrastic poetry by Allison Benis White. Greenville, South Carolina: Greenville County Museum of Art. ISBN 978-0-9974309-7-4.
- (2023) This Is Not: Aldwyth in Retrospect. Edited by Mark Sloan, with essays by Mark Sloan and Joshua Massey. Greenville, South Carolina: Greenville County Museum of Art. ISBN 978-0-9974309-6-7.
- (2021) Infra / Ultra: The Notebooks of Don ZanFagna. Edited by Mark Sloan, with essays by Kirsten Moran, Mark Sloan, and Linda Weintraub. Charleston, South Carolina: Halsey Institute of Contemporary Art, College of Charleston, School of the Arts. ISBN 9781792349188.
- (2018) Southbound: Photographs of and about the New South: A project of the Halsey Institute of Contemporary Art. Co-edited by Mark Sloan and Mark Long, with essays by Sloan and Long; ekphrastic poetry by Nikky Finney; and essays by Eleanor Heartney, William R, Ferris, John T. Edge, and Rick Bunch. Charleston, South Carolina: Halsey Institute of Contemporary Art. ISBN 9781532350535.
- (2018) Carrion Cheer. A Faunistic Tragedy by Böhler & Orendt, with a Soundscape by Ingmar Saal. Co-edited by Werner Meyer and Mark Sloan. Vienna, Austria: Verlag für Moderne Kunst; Charleston, South Carolina: Halsey Institute of Contemporary Art. ISBN 9783903269118.
- (2017) Visible Man: Fahamu Pecou. Edited with foreword by Mark Sloan. Essays by Sean Meighoo, Michael K. Wilson, Arturo Lindsay, and Amanda H. Hellman. Charleston, South Carolina: Halsey Institute of Contemporary Art. ISBN 9781532345074.
- (2016) Sons & Father: Engravings by John McWilliams. Edited by Mark Sloan and designed by Dave Wofford. Charleston, South Carolina: Halsey Institute of Contemporary Art. Limited edition artist’s book.
- (2016) Jiha Moon: Double Welcome, Most Everyone's Mad Here. Edited with a foreword by Mark Sloan. Essays by Jiha Moon, Amy G Moorefield, Lilly Wei, and Rachel Reese. Charleston, South Carolina: Halsey Institute of Contemporary Art; in association with Taubman Museum of Art, Roanoke, Virginia. ISBN 9781532326820.
- (2015) Something to Take my Place: The Art of Lonnie Holley. Edited by Mark Sloan. Essays by Bernard L. Herman, Theodore Rosengarten, Mark Sloan, and Leslie Umberger. Charleston, South Carolina: Halsey Institute of Contemporary Art. ISBN 9781467574488.
- (2014) Ruth Marten – The Unvarnished Truth: Works 2007–2013. Essays by Franz and Nadia van der Grinten, Rachel Guthrie, John Marchant, and Mark Sloan. Co-published by the Halsey Institute of Contemporary Art, Charleston, South Carolina, and Van der Grinten Gallery, Cologne:. ISBN 9783981534887.
- (2013) Renee Stout: Tales of the Conjure Woman. Edited by Mark Sloan, with essays by Mark Sloan, Andrea Barnwell Brownlee, and Kevin Young. Artist interview by Ade Offunyin. Charleston, South Carolina: Halsey Institute of Contemporary Art. ISBN 9781467586788.
- (2012) The Pulse Dome Project: Art & Design by Don ZanFagna. Edited with an essay by Mark Sloan. Charleston, South Carolina: Halsey Institute of Contemporary Art. ISBN 9781467550161.
- (2012) The Paternal Suit: Heirlooms from the F. Scott Hess Family Foundation. Edited by Mark Sloan, with an essay by Bella Menteur and text by F. Scott Hess. Charleston, South Carolina: Halsey Institute of Contemporary Art. ISBN 9781467538138.
- (2012) Return to the Sea: Saltworks by Yamamoto Motoi. Edited by Mark Sloan, with essays by Mark Sloan and Mark Kurlansky. Charleston, South Carolina: Halsey Institute of Contemporary Art. ISBN 9781467521277.
- (2012) Aggie Zed: Keeper’s Keep. Edited by Mark Sloan. Charleston, South Carolina: Halsey Institute of Contemporary Art. ISBN 9781467507905.
- (2009) Aldwyth: Work v. / Work n. —Collage and Assemblage 1991–2009. Edited by Mark Sloan, with essays by Mark Sloan and Rosamond Purcell. Charleston, South Carolina: Halsey Institute of Contemporary Art. ISBN 9780615268859.
- (2007) Force of Nature: Site Installations by Ten Japanese Artists, Edited by Mark Sloan and Brad Thomas. Charleston, South Carolina: Halsey Institute of Contemporary Art; in association with Van Every/Smith Galleries, Davidson, North Carolina. ISBN 9781890573072.
- (2004) Rarest of the Rare: Stories Behind the Treasures at the Harvard Museum of Natural History. Photographs by Mark Sloan, with text by Nancy Pick and a foreword by E.O. Wilson. New York: Harper Resource. ISBN 0060537183.
- (2002) Wild, Weird, and Wonderful: The American Circus 1901–1927, as Seen by F. W. Glasier, Photographer. Compiled, edited, and written by Mark Sloan, with an essay by Timothy Tegge. New York: Quantuck Lane. ISBN 0971454841.
- (1997) Self-Made Worlds: Visionary Folk Art Environments. Edited by Mark Sloan and Roger Manley, with a foreword by Jonathan Williams. New York: Aperture. ISBN 0893817325.
- (1993) Dear Mr. Ripley: A Compendium of Curioddities from the Believe It or Not Archives. Compiled, edited, and written by Mark Sloan, Roger Manley, and Michelle Van Parys. New York: Bulfinch Press/Little, Brown & Co. Also published in United Kingdom and Japan. ISBN 0821219685.
- (1993) Photoglyphs: Rimma Gerlovina and Valeriy Gerlovin. Edited by Mark Sloan, with essays by Mark Sloan and John P. Jacob. New Orleans, Louisiana: New Orleans Museum of Art. ISBN 0894940449.
- (1990) Hoaxes, Humbugs, and Spectacles: Astonishing Photographs of Smelt Wrestlers, Human Projectiles, Giant Hailstones, Contortionists, Elephant Impersonators, and Much, Much, More! Compiled, edited, and written by Mark Sloan, Roger Manley, and Michelle Van Parys, with a foreword by Roy Blount, Jr. New York: Villard Books/Random House. ISBN 0394585119.
