= We Were So Beloved =

- Directed by: Manfred Kirchheimer
- Produced by: Manfred Kirchheimer
- Cinematography: Manfred Kirchheimer, James Callanan, Steven Giuliano, Walter Hess
- Edited by: Manfred Kirchheimer
- Distributed by: First Run Features
- Release date: 1985 (United States)
- Running time: 145 minutes
- Language: English

We Were So Beloved is a 1985 documentary film by Manfred Kirchheimer about Jewish survivors of the Holocaust living in Washington Heights, Manhattan in New York City. It consists of interviews with family and friends interspersed with written and spoken quotes from Mein Kampf to remind the viewer of the evil that had preceded. The film received mixed reviews.

== Subject ==
Reviewers saw the film as addressing two central questions in the aftermath of the Holocaust: Is survival an end in itself? Do survivors carry the burden of responsibilities? To address these questions, Kirchheimer interviews family and friends who were able to escape Nazi Germany before 1939. Kirchheimer himself escaped with his family in 1936 at the age of 5. Those interviewed for the film settled in Washington Heights, Manhattan. By the early 1940s, they had built a thriving community (sometimes called Frankfurt-on-the-Hudson)—at the same time that millions of Jews were being murdered in Nazi concentration camps.

In the interviews, family and friends tell stories about "ordinary" Germans who risked their lives and their families to help their Jewish friends. The central questions of the documentary are asked by asking the interviewees what they would have done if they were in their German friends' places. For example, Kirchheimer, asks his father what he would have done. His father's reply is that he would not have helped if the tables were turned. He explains by saying "By nature, I'm a coward".

The film consists of more than just interviews. Interspersed with the interviews are still pictures of the interviewees and quotes written and spoken that are taken from Mein Kampf to remind the viewer of the evil that had happened.

Kirchheimer, whose perspective in the film is that survival is not an end in itself, is disturbed by some of the answers he receives. For example, two elderly Jewish women who had escaped Nazi Germany before 1939, expressed their revulsion at the more recent immigration of Hispanic people. In another scene, Louis Kampf, a professor at the Massachusetts Institute of Technology was bewildered when at age 14, his parents were not outraged when a New York City police officer beat a black man.

These middle-class survivors of the Holocaust are deeply troubled by guilt that is not theirs. In one scene, a middle-aged man remembers his father with disgust after he was released from a concentration camp and emigrated to New York City. His father had developed an utter fear of authority. It was only later that the man realized his father's strength in surviving the horrors he had faced. In another interview, Max Frankel, former editor of the New York Times, said that at the age of 6, while living in Germany, he wanted to join the Hitler Youth "if only they would have had me". Writing for the New York Times, Vincent Canby concludes that despite the film's subject matter, it is "a no less harrowing examination of conscience than Shoah and Marcel Ophuls's 'Sorrow and the Pity'".

== Critical response ==
Some reviewers found the documentary to be an important addition to other documentaries concerned with The Holocaust. Kevin Thomas writing for the Los Angeles Times wrote "there will be a need for films like Manfred Kirchheimer's". However, Jordan Hiller expressed his doubts by asking "Must we celebrate every decent Holocaust film as a success even if it adds nothing new to the genre?" David Denby writing for New York magazine dissents from praising the documentary and with regard to the two central questions of the film he says "I know that Kirchheimer is trying to escape complacency and tribal chauvinism, but his questions strike me as inane."
