= Pecou =

Pecou (french: Pécou (IPA: [peku])) is a French surname. Notable people with the surname include:

- Fahamu Pecou (born 1975), American visual artist and scholar
- Thierry Pécou (born 1965), French composer
