= Art Is... The Permanent Revolution =

- Directed by: Manfred Kirchheimer
- Produced by: Manfred Kirchheimer
- Starring: Sigmund Abeles, Ann Chernow, Paul Marcus, James Reed
- Cinematography: Zachary Alspaugh, Peter Rinaldi
- Edited by: Manfred Kirchheimer
- Production company: Streetwise Films
- Distributed by: First Run Features
- Release dates: 2 March 2012 (Quad Cinema, New York City)
- Running time: 82 minutes
- Country: United States
- Language: English

Art Is... The Permanent Revolution is a 2012 documentary film by Manfred Kirchheimer that explores how politics and the artists of the past have affected the art and process of four artists presented in documentary. There are two strands that run in parallel through the film. The first is a stream of politically inspired images by famous artists of the past and the second strand consist of interviews with four artists as they produce their politically inspired art. The documentary was viewed positively by reviewers.

== Synopsis ==
The film focuses on four American artists as they discuss politics and their creative process. As these artists talk and produce their art, interspersed are some 400 politically oriented images from some 60 artists such as Rembrandt, Honoré Daumier, George Grosz, Frans Masereel, Käthe Kollwitz, Otto Dix, and Francisco Goya.

The documentary can be characterized by two parallel lines that converge at the end. In the first line, there is a near continuous stream of images (drawings, engravings, lithographs, etchings, and woodcuts) by a large number of artists from the past matched by music that expresses their political subject matter. The second line consists of interviews with four artists as they practice their art to create a politically inspired product. It is not until the end, when the creative products of each artist are finished that the two lines of the movie converge in the artistic processes and political perspectives that allow them to create their politically inspired artistic products.

The four artists interviewed during the film are: Paul Marcus who is a woodcutter concerned with torture. Sigmund Abeles who is a painter, etcher and works on a war-themed etching. Ann Chernow who is a painter, lithographer, and creates a cemetery concerning oil and war. James Read who is a master print maker who operates a lithography press and "who is not that different in many respects from the old-time pressmen and women who worked in the bowels of a largely dying print industry".

== Critical reception ==
Rotten Tomatoes reported 100% of the reviewers liked the documentary. Writing for The Village Voice, Michelle Orange wrote that taken together in the film "these images, produced across centuries, form a larger, contiguous critique of who we are and what we do to one another". David Noh, writing for Film Journal International states that the "entire history of politically inspired printmaking unfolds in Manfred Kirchheimer's admirably serious, hands-on documentary". Writing for Time Out, Andrew Schenker concludes that "Art Is... does offer up compelling portraits of practicing artists intelligently probing their status as socially conscious image makers".
