= Tall: The American Skyscraper and Louis Sullivan =

- Directed by: Manfred Kirchheimer
- Produced by: Manfred Kirchheimer
- Starring: Sigmund Abeles, Ann Chernow, Paul Marcus, James Reed
- Cinematography: Zachary Alspaugh, Peter Rinaldi, Taiki Sugioka
- Edited by: Manfred Kirchheimer
- Production company: Streetwise Films
- Distributed by: First Run Features
- Release dates: March 17, 2006 (RiverRun International Film Festival); March 2, 2012 (United States)
- Running time: 82 minutes
- Country: United States
- Language: English

Tall: The American Skyscraper and Louis Sullivan is a 2006 documentary film by Manfred Kirchheimer that attempts to tell the story of how Louis Sullivan designed skyscrapers. The film begins by placing the viewer in late 19th century Chicago just after the Great Chicago Fire of 1871. The film takes the viewer through the early development of skyscrapers with archival photos, music and narration. It ends by focusing on the decline of Louis Sullivan. The documentary met with mixed reviews that generally liked the artistry of the documentary but found the storytelling lacking.

== Subject ==
Louis Sullivan was an architect from Chicago who achieved peak prominence as a designer of early skyscrapers during the end of the 19th century. In the 1880s, with the development of the mass production of steel, it became possible to construct buildings on steel frames. Previously, the height of buildings was limited by the load-bearing capacities of the outer walls of buildings. With the mass production of steel, steel frames for buildings could be erected and buildings could be constructed by hanging them from steel frames, thereby eliminating the need for thick load-bearing outer walls. This new construction technique allowed the construction of very tall buildings and Louis Sullivan was concerned with how to express this "newness" in design, capturing "good ol' American know-how" in the design of these new buildings.

In an 1896 essay, Sullivan revealed his fundamental law of design: "form ever follows function". For him, this law implied that the design of skyscrapers must express their tallness: "It must be in every inch a proud and soaring thing". The Wainwright Building in downtown St. Louis, Missouri and the Guaranty Building in Buffalo, New York are the most famous examples of his design from this perspective. However, the Panic of 1893 brought the construction of skyscrapers to a near stop and Sullivan met with financial ruin. He continued to design some small buildings, especially banks but he died nearly penniless in 1924. Tall: The American Skyscraper and Louis Sullivan attempts to tell some of this story.

The opening scene of the film begins with a horse standing on empty street near a warehouse. This was just after the Great Chicago Fire in 1871 that burned down much of Chicago. The horse standing alone represents the transition from the pre-modern era to the modern era and its skyscrapers. Kirchheimer attempts to capture this transition through a montage of images and music. Kirchheimer also attempts to express the idea of form following function by how he uses the camera with archival photos. For example, the first panning up shot in the film is used on the Woolworth Tower, which suddenly draws the viewer into the unprecedented immensity of these never before seen tall buildings. For other archival photos, Kirchheimer uses camera movement and an evocative soundtrack to enhance the narrative.

The latter scenes of the documentary turn to Sullivan's decline, focusing more on him than his architecture.

=== Other architects discussed ===
Several other architects are given screen time, mostly in conjunction with Sullivan. Daniel Burnham, though praised for city planning and a few of his buildings, is mostly presented as a contrast—and almost a personal nemesis—to Sullivan in artistry and "careerist" kowtowing to clients. Following Sullivan's strong criticisms, Tall blames Burnham for short-circuiting Chicago architecture's original design sense in favor of East Coast architects' slavishly slapping historic European details all over tall buildings. Frank Lloyd Wright is presented as having reconciled with Sullivan, his first employer, and as being his true heir in brilliantly conceived tall buildings. Numerous other Chicago architects are mentioned, mostly in passing, such as Dankmar Adler, Sullivan's longtime partner until economic conditions forced a breakup; Sullivan proteges George Grant Elmslie and William Gray Purcell; William Le Baron Jenney, designer of the Home Insurance Building, which generally gets credit for its steel-skeleton innovation; John Wellborn Root, Burnham's partner until Root's early death; Holabird & Roche; and later some of the entrants to the Chicago Tribune Tower design competition.

The film gives New York architects and several of their "post-Sullivan" buildings mixed coverage. There is some praise for Burnham's Flatiron Building and Cass Gilbert's Woolworth Building, but Tall generally joins Sullivan and later Wright in decrying NY architecture's historicism as inappropriate for modern America. Art Deco skyscrapers are not highly regarded by the film inasmuch as they don't adhere to Sullivan's principles, and the International Style is wholly panned as technology stripped of art.

== Critical reception ==
Following its DVD released, documentary did not receive many reviews and those it did receive were mixed. Michael Mooradian Lupro, writing for Film & History thought the film was well done when it focused on architecture, but when it turned to Sullivan as a person towards the end of the film Lupro wrote: "The cinematic techniques that were so successful in rendering the architecture are less effective when the subject shifts to people." In the Chicago Reader, Fred Camper wrote: "The images here of standing and vanished buildings and the many wise quotes from Sullivan are valuable, but the music is intrusive, the narration bland, and the attempts to meld live-action footage and stills awkward." Kent Williams, concluded the Kirchheimer largely failed to tell Sullivan's story in the film and wrote: "But the artistic touches, of which there are many, start to seem self-indulgent after a while." After its theatrical release, more than a decade later, the film received positive reviews, earning a score of 86 on review aggregator Metacritic.
