= Stations of the Elevated =

- Directed by: Manfred Kirchheimer
- Produced by: Manfred Kirchheimer
- Cinematography: Manfred Kirchheimer
- Edited by: Manfred Kirchheimer
- Music by: Charles Mingus; Aretha Franklin
- Production company: Streetwise Films
- Distributed by: First Run Features
- Release date: 1981 (New York Film Festival)
- Running time: 45 minutes
- Country: United States
- Language: English

Stations of the Elevated is a 1981 documentary film by Manfred Kirchheimer about graffiti in New York City. It debuted at the New York Film Festival. It was re-released June 27, 2014, and shown at the Brooklyn Academy of Music and was re-released throughout the United States in the fall of 2014.

== Background ==
Kirchheimer had come to the United States as a child in 1936 with his parents to escape Nazi Germany. He filmed Stations of the Elevated in 1977 and he had not known anyone who created graffiti before he started. Most people viewed graffiti artists as a nuisance at best and vandals at worst. Kirchheimer wanted to "elevate" their work as suggested in the title.

He told NPR that he would drive to the Bronx and film the trains going overhead:

They would come by and it would be screaming full of colors — just gorgeous ... The smart thing I did was shoot it all outdoors. Most of the lines are indoors, and the way most people see these paintings was indoors. Doing it outdoors gave a whole other perspective.

Stations of the Elevated debuted in 1981 at the New York Film Festival, but received no reviews and was essentially forgotten afterwards.

== Subject ==
This was the first film to document the graffiti movement in New York City, but it is not a documentary in the ordinary sense. There is no narrator and very little dialogue. Instead, subway cars covered with graffiti are followed as they move along the rails to a jazz soundtrack by Charles Mingus with Aretha Franklin. According to Leigh Silver, "... Kirchheimer captures the urban jungle in all of its untamed glory; shooting from behind branches and between scaffolding, Kirchheimer awaits the lumbering subway trains as they snake across tracks."

At one point in the film, a group of boys are watching the trains whiz by and one boy says: "That one was all right. Wasn’t nothing special. The idea was good".

According to Kevin Jagernauth writing for Indiewire, the graffiti artists featured are "Lee, The Fabulous 5, Shadow, Daze, Kase, Butch, Blade, Slave, 12 T2B, Ree, and Pusher".

Kirchheimer, in his documentary film, also asks visually: How does this artwork that was deemed illegal coexist in a city with advertising that is deemed legal [and] that is possibly more offensive?" He does this by contrasting graffiti covered subway cars with billboards covered with images of products being advertised.

== Reception and legacy ==
Rotten Tomatoes has three reviews all favorable but not enough to score the film. Daniel Walber said that viewing the film made him feel as though it was made by an extraterrestrial and it did so because "it presents the trains as the real New Yorkers". Writing for Complex, Leigh Silver explains "... Stations of the Elevated has lasting power, a certain timelessness that speaks to the soul of New York."

The documentary was restored for a 2014 re-release and was shown at the Brooklyn Academy of Music with a live performance of the soundtrack from the Mingus Dynasty.
