= Aldwyth =

American artist (1935–2026)

Mary Aldwyth Dickman
- Born: November 21, 1935; Pomona, California, U.S.
- Died: April 10, 2026 (aged 90); South Carolina, U.S.
- Education: American University; University of Hawaii; University of South Carolina (B.F.A.)
- Parents: Paul William Dickman (father); Muriel Margaret Jones Dickman (mother)
- Awards: South Carolina Governor's Award; Eben Demarest Fund Award

Mary Aldwyth Dickman (November 21, 1935 – April 10, 2026), simply known as Aldwyth, was an American artist in South Carolina who created complex collages and assemblages from found materials. Her work is principally about and minutely engaged with the history of art and culture. She worked "in relative seclusion from the larger art world".

== Early life and education ==
Mary Aldwyth Dickman was born in Pomona, California, on November 21, 1935, to Paul William Dickman, a U.S. Naval Chaplain, and Muriel Margaret Jones Dickman. In 1953, she attended American University, where she studied painting with Ben "Joe" Summerford, and in 1954–1955, she spent a year at the University of Hawaii, studying with Jean Charlot. Intermittently after 1953, while raising three young children, she attended the University of South Carolina in Columbia, where she studied with Catharine Rembert, among others, and earned a B.A. in Fine Arts in 1966.

== Career and work ==
From the 1980s, the artist lived and worked on Hilton Head Island, South Carolina, signing and exhibiting her work under the mononym, Aldwyth. "While her meticulously assembled boxes and collages prepared from bits of cut-out art history books, encyclopedias, and other historical texts recall artists like Joseph Cornell, Kurt Schwitters, and Bruce Conner, it is the subversive spirit of Duchamp that has had the most profound impact on her work", according to Bradley Bailey. "An art historian in her own right, Aldwyth uses her vast knowledge to reframe artists in new contexts. Her collage Document (1999-infinity) for example, offers an alternate canon of art history, revising an early edition of H.W. Janson's undergraduate textbook mainstay History of Art to include overlooked women artists and institutions of the past and present."

Individual works are often very large and take years to complete. The collage Casablanca (classic version), for instance, took over three years (2003-2006) and measures approximately six square feet square. It "features a large dripping orb…. the drips are composed of hundreds of staring eyeballs. Each one is the eye of an artist, culled from photographic sources: a Chuck Close self-portrait eye, a Lichtenstein Ben-day dotted eye, the silhouetted eyes of squadrons of artists, known and unknown", according to Oriane Stender.

A major one-person exhibition organized by Mark Sloan appeared at the Ackland Art Museum (2009), the Halsey Institute of Contemporary Art (2009-2010), and the Telfair Museum of Art (2010). Its catalogue includes essays by Sloan, Rosamond Purcell, and an appendix by the artist that serves as a sort of concordance, listing, among other content, the well-over 100 artists and works whose eyes are seen in Casablanca (classic version), as well as the contents of the 26 collaged cigar boxes that comprise Encyclopædia (2000): found objects sorted alphabetically by box. Numerous other one-person exhibitions include ones at the Milliken Gallery, Converse College, Spartanburg, SC (1996), the Sumter County Gallery of Art (2014), 701 Center for Contemporary Art, Columbia SC (2016), the Morris Museum of Art, Augusta (2016), and the NC State Gregg Museum of Art & Design (2023). In addition to dozens in South Carolina and around the southeast, Aldwyth's work has appeared in group exhibitions in New York (including at Alan Stone Gallery and Francis M. Naumann Fine Art), Colorado, Connecticut, and Washington, DC. Three illustrations of Aldwyth's Casablanca (Classic Version) appeared in Harper's Magazine, August, 2010. A 2021 documentary film about the artist, Aldwyth: Fully Assembled, produced by Olympia Stone, premiered on South Carolina Public Television in March 2022.

A large retrospective curated by Mark Sloan began February 2, 2023 at the Gregg Museum of Art and Design. The exhibit, titled "This is Not: Aldwyth in Retrospect" showed a spans of nearly seventy years of Aldwyth's work, beginning with photography and moving through her experimental painting, assemblage, and collage work. A catalog was published to coincide with the Exhibit, bearing the same title. "This is not: Aldwyth in Retrospect" premiered at the Gregg Museum of Art and Design, spanning from February 2 to October 7, 2023 before it moved to the Greenville County Museum of Art from May 1, 2024 to July 28, 2024. The exhibition was on view at the Coastal Discovery Museum from October 16 to March 23, 2025.

== Death ==
Aldwyth died in a hospice facility near Hilton Head Island on April 10, 2026, at the age of 90.

== Awards ==
- 2015 South Carolina Governor's Award for the Arts (formerly the Elizabeth O'Neill Verner Governor's Award for the Arts)
- 2019 Eben Demarest Fund Award

== Public collections ==
- Ackland Art Museum, The University of North Carolina, Chapel Hill
- College of Charleston Foundation Collection, Charleston
- Jepson Telfair Museums, Savannah
- John Michael Kohler Arts Center, Sheboygan
- South Carolina State Museum, Columbia
- State Art Collection, South Carolina Arts Commission
- Greenville County Museum of Art
