= Robert Karjel =

Swedish writer (born 1965)

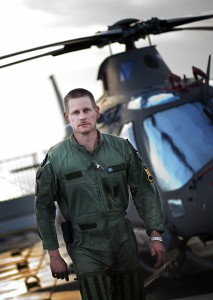
- Karjel aboard HSwMS Carlskrona in Gulf of Aden, May 2010.
- Born: 25 October 1965 (age 60); Gothenburg, Sweden
- Education: Royal Institute of Technology, Stockholm (Applied Physics)
- Occupation: Helicopter Pilot/ Writer
- Writing career
- Language: Swedish
- Genre: Literary Thriller
- Website: www.robert-karjel.com

Robert Karjel (born 25 October 1965) is a Swedish writer of literary thrillers. He was born in Gothenburg, Sweden, and lives in Stockholm. A helicopter pilot, he is a Lt. Colonel in the Swedish Air Force and the only Swedish pilot who has trained with the U.S. Marines.

In May 2015, his novel The Swede received a starred review in Publishers Weekly. HarperCollins had purchased the thriller for publication in the U.S. in 2013. Publishers in other ten countries followed suit, including France, Brazil, Israel and Germany. The novel, which has been compared to Homeland (TV series), looks at the complex consequences of the War on Terror. In the UK, the thriller's title is My Name Is N.

On 31 July 2015, the Guardian online ran his article discussing controversy over a thriller with a bisexual hero. The Swede was shortlisted for a 2016 Lambda Literary Award. Booklist listed The Swede as one of the Best Crime Novels of 2016.

In 2013, 20th Century Fox Television bought the rights to The Swede for adaptation as a TV drama. As of 2015, the series remained under development by Chernin Entertainment and Yellow Bird (company), the Swedish film production company known for The Girl with the Dragon Tattoo and its sequels.

== Early life ==
Karjel grew up in the small city of Örebro, the son of a Swedish mother, Solveig, and an Estonian father, Raivo. His father escaped Estonia as a child at the end of World War II. "Perhaps my mixed Swedish-Estonian background created a permanent inner tension," Karjel wrote in an author profile. "The almost mythic stories of heroism I heard growing up clashed with the dullness of the Swedish suburb where I lived."

== Personal life ==
In 1987, Karjel traveled to the Amazon jungle, where he lived with Swedish missionaries in a village dependent on the cocaine trade, material he used in his second book, Shadow of the River. In 1993, he appeared in the Swedish TV version of Fort Boyard (game show), in which he had to arm-wrestle a muscleman, do complex math under pressure, and dive into the ocean to retrieve a key. In 2000, he traveled with his 6-year-old daughter across Egypt's Great Sand Sea, doing research for his third book, Gospel of the Hanged. He has taken his younger daughter scuba diving in the Red Sea.

Karjel writes his first drafts by hand, in lined notebooks he can carry on military assignments.

== Career ==
In 2010, Karjel commanded a helicopter squadron on the ship HSwMS Carlskrona (P04), as part of the EU's Operation Atalanta fighting Somali pirates in the Gulf of Aden. He was interviewed during the mission in a BBC documentary film, The Trouble with Pirates. From 2011 to 2013, he directed an $800 million program for the Swedish Air Force, procuring Black Hawk helicopters for medivac operations in Afghanistan.

In 2005, he was a Copeland Fellow at Amherst College, where he wrote much of The Swede. In 2013, he held a writer's residency at Ledig House, Omi International Arts Center, upstate New York.

He lectures frequently on the topic of leadership under pressure. In February 2017, he was named Speaker of the Year in Sweden.

== Books ==
- The Swede (De redan döda, Wahlström & Widstrand, 2010), HarperCollins, 2015, translated into English with Nancy Pick. In the German edition: Der Schwede. In the Polish edition: Szwed, który zniknał. In the Czech edition: Švéd. In Slovenian: Šved, ki je izginil. In the Dutch edition: De Zweed. In Greek: Ο Σουηδός. In Hebrew: השוודי. In the Italian edition: Lo Svedese.
- De hängdas evangelium (Gospel of the Hanged), Wahlström & Widstrand, 2005.
- Skuggan av floden (Shadow of the River), Wahlström & Widstrand, 1999.
- Gå över gränsen (Crossing the Border), Wahlström & Widstrand, 1997.
- "Ut ur Kabul" (Out of Kabul, 2023)
- "Bli någon att räkna med" (Someone to Count On, 2024)
