= ONE: Union of the Senses =

Mural by José Parlá in New York City

- Artist: José Parlá
- Year: 2014
- Medium: Mural
- Dimensions: 4.6 m × 27 m (15 ft × 90 ft)
- Location: New York City, New York
- Owner: One World Trade Center

ONE: Union of the Senses is a mural by American artist José Parlá on display in the lobby of One World Trade Center in Manhattan, New York City. Commissioned in 2014, the painting was completed and installed in 2015. Measuring 90 feet wide, the painting is believed to be the largest painting in New York City.

The painting is noted for its bright colors. It utilizes Parlá's trademark style, invoking elements of graffiti and calligraphy.

The mural is seen by an estimated 20,000 people entering the building each day.

== Commission ==
The Durst Corporation, building developers of the One World Trade Center, appointed Asher Edelman and his gallery, Edelman Arts, to curate the art for the new building. The team selected a few artists, all American, to contribute art for the new building, deciding that all the art in the new building should be abstract and reflect the theme of unity.

Edelman said the painting seemed appropriate for the front entrance where people come in the building every morning, remarking specifically about its bright colors.

== Creation ==
The painting was created by Miami-born, Brooklyn-based artist José Parlá. Parlá, a former street artist, had previously painted murals at the Brooklyn Academy of Music and the Barclays Center. The painting measures 15 feet by 90 feet, making it Parlá largest work to date.

Parlá worked on the mural over a period of 8 months at his studio in Brooklyn. Parlá described an “almost-acrobatic” style he used in its creation, calling the work the most physical piece he had ever done. Some of the long strokes were created by putting his brush on the canvas, then dragging it down as he jumped off his ladder. The momentum of the jumps frequently threw him out of the room. He then worked on it for two more weeks on-site in the lobby of One World Trade Center.

=== Themes ===
Parlá said he wanted the sculpture to stand as a symbol of unity and diversity, with the various colors representing the diversity of people, saying “It was very important to me that this painting would reflect a massive respect to the situation and event and the families, and a massive respect for the site.”

== Documentary short ==
In 2017, Parlá produced a documentary short, also called ONE: Union of the Senses, inspired by his mural. Parlá described the documentary as a "love letter to New York."

== See also ==
- Artwork in the World Trade Center
- The World Trade Center Tapestry, the tapestry displayed in the lobby of the old World Trade Center.
