= Nancy Pick =

American nonfiction author

Nancy Elizabeth Pick is an American journalist and author of nonfiction books.

== Education and career ==
Pick is a 1983 graduate of Amherst College, and the daughter of an Amherst alumnus. After graduating Phi Beta Kappa and teaching English at the University of Dijon in France, in 1984 she became assistant editor of the Winchester Star in Winchester, Massachusetts. She has also worked as a reporter for the Baltimore Evening Sun, and as a staff writer for the Harvard Museum of Natural History.

== Books ==
Pick's books include:

- The Rarest of the Rare: Stories Behind the Treasures at the Harvard Museum of Natural History, with photographs by Mark Sloan, and an introduction by Edward O. Wilson, HarperCollins, 2004.
- Curious Footprints: Professor Hitchcock's Dinosaur Tracks & Other Natural History Treasures at Amherst College, Amherst College Press, 2006. See: Edward Hitchcock.
- Skuggorna vi bär : Stig Dagerman möter Etta Federn i Paris 1947 / Les Ombres de Stig Dagerman / The Writer and the Refugee, written with Lo Dagerman, Sweden: Norstedts, 2017; France: Maurice Nadeau, 2018. See: Etta Federn.
- Eye Mind Heart: A View of Amherst College at 200, Amherst College Press, 2021.
- Do Plants Know Math?: Unwinding the Story of Plant Spirals, from Leonardo Da Vinci to Now, written with fr: Stéphane Douady, Jacques Dumais, and Christophe Golé, Princeton University Press, 2024. Winner of the 2026 Euler Book Prize.

She also translated Robert Karjel's thriller novel The Swede from Swedish into English, with the author. In addition, she has translated fr: Clarisse Griffon du Bellay’s memoir Raw from French into English.

== Personal life ==
Pick lives in Sunderland, Massachusetts with her husband, Amherst College law professor Lawrence Douglas; they have two sons. They married in Chicago in 1991.
