= José Parlá =

Brooklyn-based contemporary artist

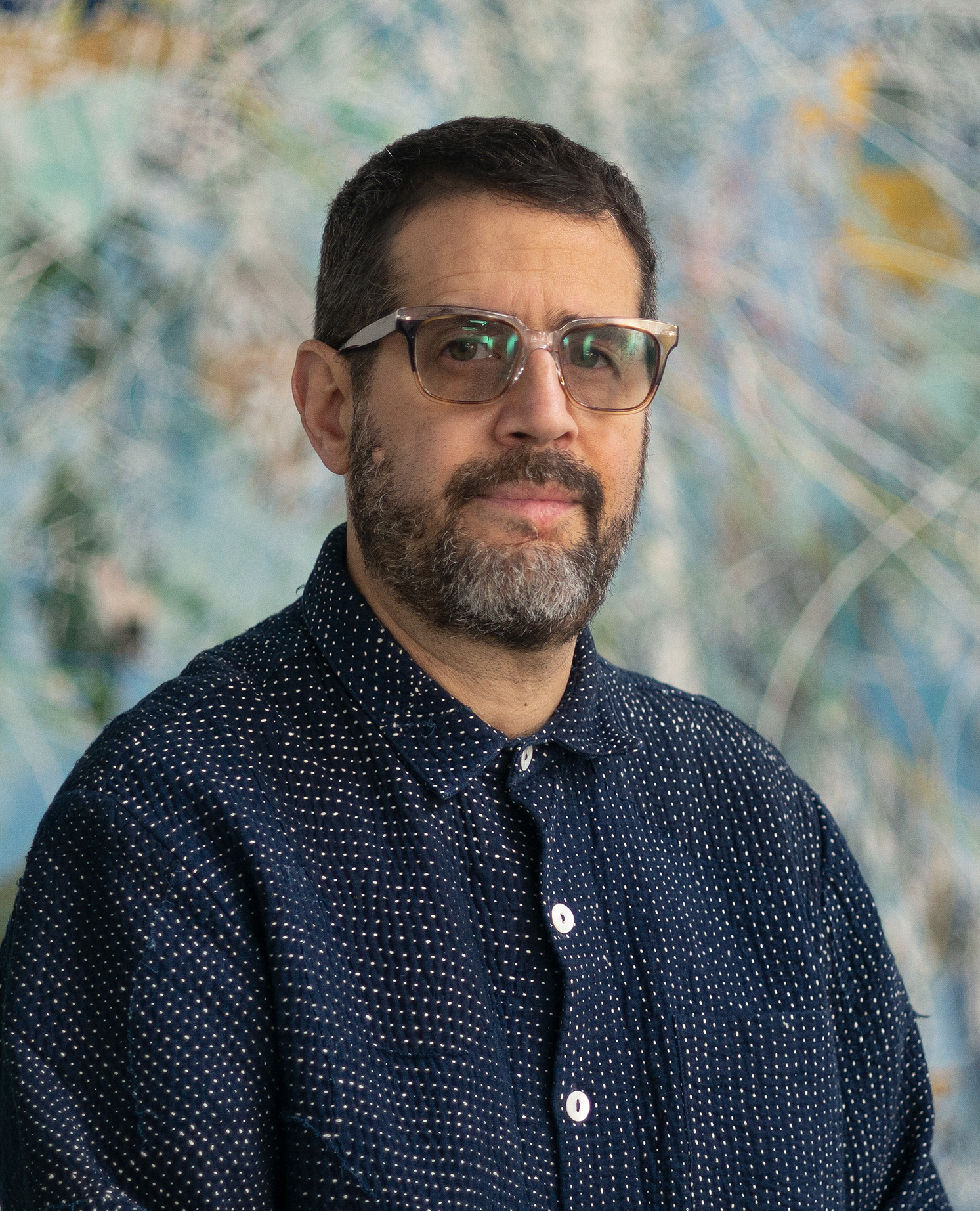
- Parlá in 2025
- Born: 1973 (age 52–53); Miami, Florida, U.S.
- Education: Savannah College of Art and Design; New World School of the Arts
- Known for: Art, Sculpture, Painting, Photography
- Notable work: ONE: Union of the Senses; Diary of Brooklyn
- Awards: Grand Prize, Best Documentary Short, Best U.S. Premiere, Heartland Film Festival For Wrinkles of the City, Havana Cuba
- Website: joseparla.com

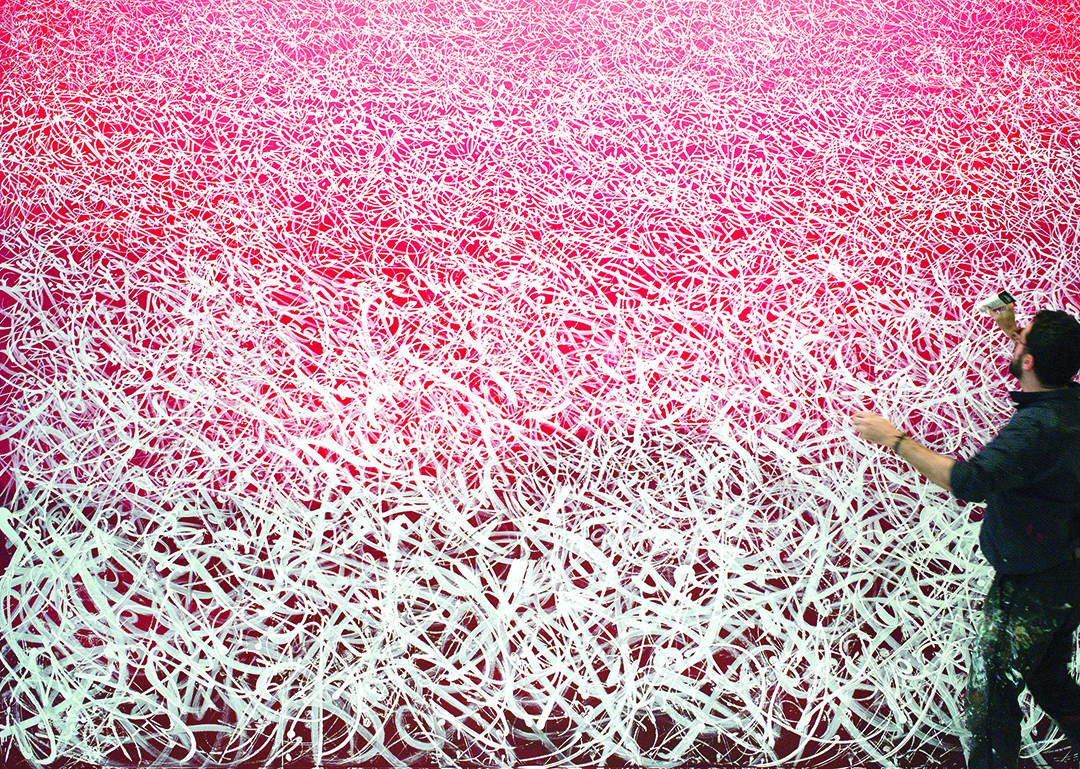
Nature of Language

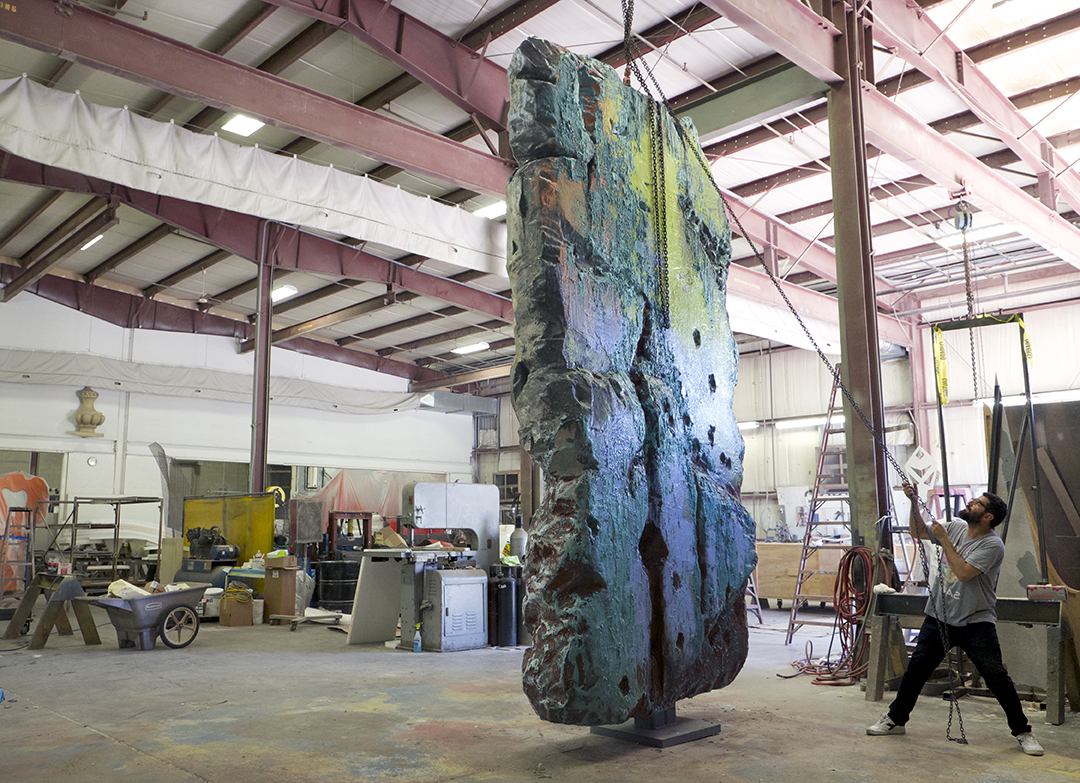
Havana Cuba Sculpture

José Parlá (born 1973 in Miami, Florida) is a Cuban-American contemporary artist based in Brooklyn, New York. Parlá creates paintings and multidisciplinary works inspired by his interest in memory, identity, migration, and the passage of time through the visual language of accumulated urban surfaces. Critics have interpreted these techniques as engaging with questions of language, politics and the meaning of place and public space.

Parlá’s approach to mark-making is both physical and textural, integrating bodily gestures into a painterly stream of consciousness that features areas of addition, erasure, and layering, questioning the status quo of visual culture. Parlá is publicly known for his permanent installations of large-scale paintings. In 2013 he painted the mural Nature of Language at the James B. Hunt Jr. Library at North Carolina State University, the mural Diary of Brooklyn at the Barclays Center, and a 90-foot mural ONE: Union of the Senses in the lobby of One World Trade Center. He later completed Amistad América (2018) at the University of Texas at Austin, a large-scale mural commissioned for Robert B. Rowling Hall as part of the university’s Landmarks public art program.

Parlá constructs his paintings improvisationally by layering materials. He said, "I’m really interested in the way our lives are built up out of memory and history, and how we reflect that in our surroundings." He has exhibited worldwide and collaborated with artists from various countries. In 2012, he worked with French artist JR on a piece titled "Wrinkles of the City: Havana", which in the same year was selected to be in the 11th Havana Biennial. As part of the collaboration, Parlá and JR co-directed a documentary by the same title and they were awarded the Grand Prize from Heartland Film Festival for the Best Documentary Short and Best U.S. Premiere Documentary Short in 2013.

== Early life ==
José Parlá was born in Miami to Cuban immigrant parents. At just 10, he began painting art on walls in Miami, often signing his work with his writer's name "Ease". As a teenager, he became active in Miami's aerosal art scene and frequently collaborated with his brother, Rey Parlá. In 1992, the brothers alongside friend Chris Mendoza helped establish The Inkheads, a Miami-based aerosol art collective known for its collaborative approach to artmaking and documentation.

Parlá received a scholarship to Savannah College of Art & Design when he was 16, after a high school teacher noticed his talent. He later studied at Miami Dade Community College and New World School of the Arts.

He moved to the Bronx after his father died to established himself as an artist in New York, initially supporting himself by designing album covers and T-shirts for hip-hop artists including Gang Starr.

== Career ==
Parlá's heavily layered paintings can often resemble distressed city walls. Writer Greg Tate wrote: "What José Parlá's paintings force us to realize, as good historical paintings always do, is that given enough time and entropy even the hurtling locomotive motion of the streets can be arrested, contemplated, symbolically apprehended, studied, replicated. The temptation to call Parlá a 'post-graffiti’ painter is great but I'd prefer we recognize him as a historical landscape painter even though his historical landscape is made of concrete, wood and wallboard and his 'histories' derive from personal memories and from events buried and embedded in the gorgeous erosions and ruination time and weather will deposit on your average urban walls." Parlá finds old posters from city streets, which he incorporates into his paintings to give a greater sense of place and create the impression of layers of posters papered over each other for generations. He paints over these with thick splashes of colour and abstract calligraphy, weaving lines connecting the works together, similarly to Cy Twombly's paintings from the 1950s. Each work attempts to describe the place where he is working. Exhibitions such as José Parlá: Segmented Realities (2015, High Museum of Art, Atlanta) recreate these walls in three dimensions.

== Large scale murals ==
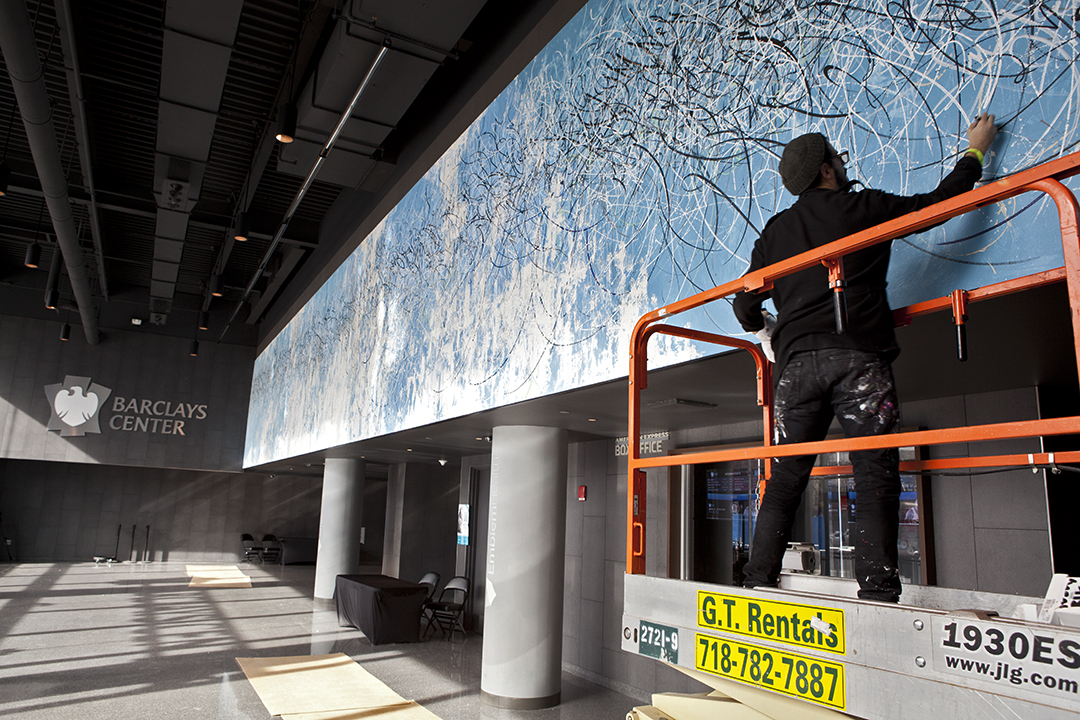
Parlá painting Diary of Brooklyn at Barclay's Center in Brooklyn

Parlá's first large-scale mural was for a Toronto housing development called City Place in 2010. In 2012, he painted a 70-foot long lobby mural titled Diary of Brooklyn for the Barclays Center, and a lobby painting titled Gesture Performing Dance, Dance Performing Gesture, for the Brooklyn Academy of Music's Fisher Theater. Parlá worked on the two painting simultaneously, going back and forth between the two nearby buildings and working late.

In 2013, he painted the mural The Nature of Language for the newly constructed James B. Hunt Jr. Library at the North Carolina State University. In 2015 Parlá painted ONE: Union of the Senses which is displayed in the lobby of One World Trade Center, curated by Asher Edelman and Edelman Arts, appointed by the building developer. The painting measures 15 ft by 90 ft, and has been described as the largest painting in New York City.

In 2023, Parlá completed a public commission for the Far Rockaway Writer's Library in Queens, New York, a collaboration with the architecture firm Snøhetta.

== Career summary ==
In 2011, Parlá was commissioned to paint two gigantic and highly detailed murals for the Parade1 building at Concord CityPlace in Toronto, Canada. The paintings titled The Names that Live But Sometimes Fade While Time Flies and The Bridge although abstract in nature- are filled with stories of different artists, which Parlá pays homage through calligraphic marks and gestures.

In 2012, Parlá was commissioned to create a site specific-piece for the inside of the EmblemHealth Dean entrance at the Barclays Centre. The piece titled, Diary of Brooklyn is inspired by the book Brooklyn Is by James Agee and is visible from the street, creating an interaction with the public. Also in 2012, Parlá completed his first large scale commissioned artwork titled Gesture Performing Dance, Dance Performing Gesture. According to Parlá, this 37 feet long by 7 feet tall mural located at The Brooklyn Academy Of Music serves as a "reminder that we are not passive bystanders; we are active participants in a world that our senses produce for us, from moment to moment."

In 2012, Parlá collaborated with his brother, Rey Parlá, on U.T.O.P.I.A., an exhibition presented at Colette in Paris.The project combined José Parlá’s paintings with Rey Parlá’s film and photographic work, reflecting a creative partnership that had originated in their youth in Miami. The exhibition documented the brothers’ shared interest in urban culture, memory, and visual storytelling, and coincided with a period in which José Parlá was completing several major public commissions.

In 2012, Parlá collaborated with French artist JR on a huge mural installation in Havana. The project was undertaken for the Havana Biennale, for which JR and Parlá photographed and recorded 25 senior citizens who had lived through the Cuban revolution. In 2013, Parlá completed a piece titled Nature of Language at the North Carolina State University's Hunt Library designed by Snøhetta in Raleigh. The artist describes the piece here, "Although illegible at first sight, the juxtaposed characters, gestures, hieroglyphs, and words become readable through feeling, as it is my hope that the work evokes the language of your own inner voice of your own history. I found inspiration in the essence of words and their combined power, however abstract within a landscape of gestural forms and characters that serve as carriers of meaning. Within this meta-landscape, a viewer is welcomed to read into or feel the Nature of this universal language putting grammatical forms on hold."

In 2014, Parlá was commissioned to paint a piece for the One World Trade Centre in New York City. Visitors to the lobby of One World Trade Centre is greeted by Parlá's colorful 90 ft mural titled ONE: Union of the Senses which stands as a symbol of diversity. "The lively, jewel-toned mural will greet an estimated 20,000 visitors a day. I think that the role of the art is to create life within a building, said Mr. Edelman, It's not just about white marble walls, it's about spirit and life." Parlá has said that "It was very important to me that this painting would reflect a massive respect to the situation and event and the families, and a massive respect for the site."

In 2014, Parlá exhibited two paintings at the High Museum. One painting which is 40 feet long titled "Night and Day in London Town" poetically evokes time passing over the course of a day in London and incorporates Parlá's calligraphic mark-making. The second painting, titled Hackney Canal, Rio Don Diego 2008 is a large painting inspired by Wifredo Lam's masterpiece "La Jungla," 1943 (collection of the Museum of Modern Art, New York).

In 2015, Parlá showcased his sculptural pieces titled Segmented Realities at the 12th Havana Biennial.

In 2018, Parlá completed Amistad América, a monumental site-specific mural commissioned for Robert B. Rowling Hall at the University of Texas at Austin. Measuring approximately 4,000 square feet, the work was created for the university’s Landmarks public art program and is installed in the building’s central atrium. Inspired by the natural and cultural landscapes of Texas and the Americas, the mural incorporates Parlá’s characteristic layered surfaces, calligraphic forms, and references to migration, geography, and cultural exchange. Amistad América was notable as the first painting acquired by Landmarks and was, at the time of its completion, the largest mural of Parlá’s career.

In 2020, Parlá presented It's Yours at the Bronx Museum of the Arts, his first solo museum exhibition in New York City. Curated by Manon Slome, the exhibition featured a series of large-scale paintings reflecting Parlá's personal connection to the Bronx and the borough's influence on his artistic practice. While drawing on the Bronx's role in the development of hip-hop culture, the works addressed themes including redlining, gentrification, displacement, and structural racism, encouraging viewers to consider questions of ownership and change in New York City's neighborhoods. The exhibition's title was derived from the 1984 single "It's Yours" by Bronx rapper T La Rock, which Parlá cited as a tribute to the community and cultural forces that shaped his work.

In 2021, Parlá contracted a severe case of COVID-19 and was hospitalized, spending several months in a medically induced coma during which he suffered a stroke and brain hemorrhaging. Following an extended period of rehabilitation, he gradually returned to painting, using art-making as part of his physical and cognitive recovery. The experience profoundly influenced his subsequent work, inspiring a number of exhibitions and series that explored memory, perception, consciousness, and mortality. In interviews, Parlá described experiencing vivid dreams and hallucinations during his coma, which later informed his Phosphene series (2023), named after the visual phenomenon of seeing patterns of light with closed eyes. He has stated that the works were shaped by his recovery process and by reflections on survival, healing, and the fragility of life.

In 2022, Parlá presented Ciclos: Blooms of Mold as part of Brooklyn Abstraction: Four Artists, Four Walls at the Brooklyn Museum. The exhibition featured installations by Maya Hayuk, Parlá, Kennedy Yanko, and Leon Polk Smith, all artists associated with Brooklyn. Created for the museum's Beaux-Arts Court, Parlá's contribution consisted of large-scale environmental paintings that engaged with the architectural space and explored themes of surface, materiality, and abstraction.

In 2023, Parlá was awarded a Gordon Parks Foundation Fellowship in Art. The fellowship culminated in the exhibition José Parlá: Cuba, presented at the Gordon Parks Foundation Gallery in 2024. The exhibition featured paintings and photographs created in dialogue with a series of photographs taken by Gordon Parks in Cuba in 1958 while on assignment for Life magazine. Drawing on his Cuban heritage and personal connections to Havana, Miami, and New York, Parlá explored themes of memory, identity, history, and the social and political transformations of Cuba. The works responded to the visual language of Parks's photographs, particularly their use of color, texture, and documentation of Cuban life on the eve of the Cuban Revolution.

In 2024, Parlá presented José Parlá: Homecoming at the Pérez Art Museum Miami (PAMM), which is his first solo museum exhibition in his hometown of Miami. The exhibition featured new paintings, photographs, and a large-scale installation that included a reconstruction of the artist's Brooklyn studio within the museum galleries, offering insight into his creative process and personal archive. Addressing themes of migration, memory, identity, resilience, and belonging, the exhibition reflected on Parlá's Cuban heritage, his upbringing in Miami, and his recovery following a life-threatening illness in 2021. In 2026, PAMM acquired Homecoming (Before Time, the First Migrations), a major work from the exhibition, for its permanent collection.

In 2025, the short documentary Marking the Way Home, directed by Lázaro Llanes, produced by the Pérez Art Museum Miami(PAMM) and co- produced by Rey Parlá, premiered in conjunction with Parlá's exhibition José Parlá: Homecoming. The film follows Parlá’s artistic journey, his Cuban heritage, and his return to Miami for his first major museum exhibition in his hometown. It also documents his recovery following a severe case of COVID-19 in 2021, during which he spent four months in a medically induced coma and suffered a stroke and brain bleeding. The documentary includes a screening and Q&A component and features contributions from artists and cultural figures including KAWS, Hank Willis Thomas, Lee Quiñones, Anne Pasternak, and Sarah Arison. It explores themes of resilience, memory, identity, and artistic practice, situating Parlá’s work within both personal and broader cultural narratives.

In 2025, Parlá presented Home Away from Home, a solo exhibition held concurrently at Pola Museum Annex Ginza and Kotaro Nukaga in Tokyo, on view from June 20 to August 9, 2025. The exhibitions featured new paintings inspired by Parlá's experiences in Japan since 1999, including work made during a residency at a Bizen pottery kiln.

In 2025, Skira published José Parlá: Contemporary Palimpsests, a monograph surveying four decades of the artist's work through paintings, murals, sketchbooks, and archival materials. Edited by Rey Parlá, the volume includes essays by Jonathan Rider and Iván de la Nuez and examines recurring themes in Parlá's practice.

In 2026, Parlá was appointed Alan Kanzer Artist-in-Residence at Columbia University's Mortimer B. Zuckerman Mind Brain Behavior Institute. During the residency, he collaborated with neuroscientists studying perception, learning, memory, and the brain, furthering his longstanding interest in the relationship between art and neuroscience. Research developed through the residency informed ENGRAMS, a series and broader interdisciplinary project whose title refers to the physical traces of memory in the brain. Later that year, Parlá presented José Parlá: ENGRAMS at Ben Brown Fine Arts in London. Drawing on memories of Havana, Hakone, and New York, the exhibition explored memory as an active process of reconstruction, with works created from recollection rather than direct observation. The exhibition formed part of an ongoing investigation developed through his residency at Columbia and examined the intersections of memory, place, gesture, and imagination.

== Exhibitions ==
In 2014, Parlá exhibited his first museum solo show by the title of Segmented Realities at the High Museum of Art Atlanta from December 2014 – May 2015, followed by the 2015 group exhibition Imagining New Worlds at the High Museum of Art Atlanta alongside Cuban surrealist painter Wifredo Lam and Atlanta based contemporary artist Fahamu Pecou.

In the fall of 2015, Parlá held a concurrent solo exhibition at Mary Boone Gallery and Bryce Wolkowitz Gallery titled Surface Body/ Action Space. This exhibition showcased new paintings and sculptures never before seen. Parlá's work is in the permanent collections of HOMECOMING ( Before Time, the First Migration) at Pérez Art Museum Miami, Florida; La Habana Sunset at Brooklyn Museum, New York, works at the British Museum, London; Buffalo AKG Art Museum, Buffalo, New York; POLA Museum of Art, Hakone, Japan; The Burger Collection in Hong Kong; Museo Nacional de Bellas Artes, Havana, Cuba; Neuberger Museum of Art, Purchase, NY; El Espacio, Miami, Florida

In 2024, the Pérez Art Museum Miami organized José Parlá: Homecoming, the artist's first solo exhibition in his South Florida hometown presenting a site-specific mural and a series of never shown large-scale paintings.The exhibition seeks to replicate Parlá's studio space with Cuban music albums, objects, furniture, paint, and myriad of other daily materials.

=== Solo Shows ===
- 2006 Koehler Gallery, Whitworth College, Spokane, Washington; The Mystic Writing Pad
- 2007 Elms Lesters Painting Rooms, London; Adaptation/ Translation
- 2008 Cristina Grajales, NYC; Layered Days
- 2009 Ooi Botos Gallery, Hong Kong, China; Reading Through Seeing
- 2009 V1 Gallery, Copenhagen, Denmark; The New Yorkers
- 2011 Bryce Wolkowitz Gallery, NYC; Walls, Diaries and Paintings
- 2011 OHWOW Gallery (now Morán Morán), Los Angeles; Character Gestures
- 2012 Brooklyn Academy of Music, Brooklyn, New York; Gesture Performing Dance, Dance Performing Gesture
- 2013 Haunch of Venison, London; Broken Language
- 2013 Yuka Tsuruno Gallery, Tokyo; Prose
- 2014 Bryce Wolkowitz Gallery, NYC; In Medias Res
- 2015 High Museum of Art, Atlanta; Segmented Realities
- 2015 Bryce Wolkowitz Gallery, NYC; Action Space
- 2015 Mary Boone Gallery, NYC; Surface Body
- 2016 Yuka Tsuruno Gallery, Tokyo; Small Golden Suns
- 2016 Michael-Goss Foundation, Dallas; Instincts
- 2016 YoungArts, Miami; Roots
- 2017 Brand New Gallery, Milan, Italy; Mirrors
- 2017 Brooklyn Academy of Music; ONE: Union of the Senses
- 2017 SCAD Museum of Art, Savannah, Georgia; Roots
- 2018 Neuberger Museum of Art Neu Space 42 No Space / Non Place
- 2018 Ben Brown Fine Arts, London; Echo of Impressions
- 2019 Istanbul74, Istanbul (16th Istanbul Biennial parallel project); Isthmus
- 2019 Ben Brown Fine Arts, Hong Kong; Textures of Memory
- 2019 HOCA Foundation, Hong Kong; Textures of Memory
- 2019 Bryce Wolkowitz Gallery, NYC; Anonymous Vernacular
- 2020 Bronx Museum of the Arts, New York City; It's Yours
- 2020 Yuka Tsuruno Gallery, Tokyo; The Awakening
- 2020 Gana Art Center, Seoul, Korea; Entropies
- 2022 Gana Art Center, Seoul; Breathing
- 2022 Library Street Collective, Detroit, MI; Polarities
- 2023 Ben Brown Fine Arts, Hong Kong(March–April); Phosphene
- 2023 Ben Brown Fine Arts, London(October–November);Phosphene
- 2024 Pérez Art Museum Miami, Miami, Florida; José Parlá: Homecoming
- 2024 Zidoun-Bossuyt Gallery, Luxembourg; José Parlá: Arterial
- 2024 The Gordon Parks Foundation, New York, NY; José Parlá: CUBA
- 2025 Pola Museum Annex, Ginza & Kotaro Nukaga Gallery, Tokyo; Home Away from Home
- 2026 Ben Brown Fine Arts, London; José Parlá:ENGRAMS

=== Group Shows ===
- 2004 Chelsea Art Museum, NYC; Hollywood to the Street: Mimmo Rotella and José Parlá
- 2007 Elms Lesters Painting Rooms, London; Pirate Utopias – Futura and José Parlá
- 2008 Kai Kai Ki Ki Gallery, Tokyo; Hi & Lo.
- 2009 OHWOW Gallery, Miami;It Ain’t Fair
- 2009 Deitch Projects, NYC, Stages
- 2009 Galerie Perrotin, Paris; Stages
- 2009 Kidd Yellin Gallery, Brooklyn, New York; The Kings County Biennial
- 2010 Bryce Wolkowitz Gallery, New York City; The New Grand Tour
- 2015 High Museum of Art, Atlanta; Imagining New Worlds, Wifredo Lam, José Parlá, Fahamu Pecou.
- 2016 Neuberger Museum of Art Purchase College, New York, NY; Post No Bills: Public Walls as Studio and Source
- 2017 Victors for Art, U-M Museum of Art, University of Michigan, Michigan, MI
- 2018 Kennedy Center, Washington DC; Artes de Cuba: From the Island to the World
- 2019 Brooklyn Museum, Brooklyn, NY; Yasiin bey: Negus
- 2019 25 Kent Ave, Williamsburg, New York, NY; Beyond the Streets
- 2019 Fondazione Berengo Art Space, Venice; Glasstress 2019
- 2019 Gana Art Seoul, Seoul; Reflections
- 2020 Ben Brown Fine Arts, Hong Kong; Ben Brown Fine Arts: Celebrating 10 Years in Hong Kong
- 2021 Bryce Wolkowitz Gallery, New York, NY; The Future We Choose
- 2022 '74 Gallery, Bodrum, Turkey; Between Humankind and Nature,
- 2022 Brooklyn Museum of Art, Brooklyn, NY; Brooklyn Abstraction: Four Artists, Four Walls
- 2023 Baltimore Museum of Art, MD; The Culture: Hip Hop and Contemporary Art in the 21st Century

== Awards, panels and residencies ==
- 2006 Koehler Gallery, Whitworth College Northwest Museum of Arts & Culture, Spokane, Washington
- 2013 Grand Prize Documentary Short Heartland Film Festival for Wrinkles of the City, Havana Cuba co-directed with JR
- 2014 Istanbul74’ Arts & Culture Festival, Istanbul, Turkey; Brooklyn Arts Council honoree
- 2014 Snøhetta - 479 Baltic Street Studio residency
- 2016 Miami Dade College, Miami, Alumni Hall of Fame Award Inductee
- 2019 Americans for the Arts' Public Art Network Year in Review Award
- 2022 Americans for the Arts National Art Award
- 2022 National YoungArts Foundation Award
- 2023 Hirshhorn Museum Artist x Artist honoree (with Hank Willis Thomas)
- 2023 Gordon Parks Foundation Fellowship
- 2024 Scholastic Art & Writing Awards, Alumni Achievement Award
- 2025 The Bizen Pottery Kiln residency
- 2026 Alan Kanzer Artist-in-Residence at Columbia University's Zuckerman Institute

== Bibliography ==
- Boatright, Kristen, In the Studio with José Parlá, Artinfo.com, 1 October 2014
- Kinberger, Charlotte, José Parlá In the Midst of Things, Whitewall, 30 September 2014
- Baumgardner, Julie, Higher Ground, Cultured Magazine, September 2014
- Binlot, Ann, A Lesson in Cultural Diplomacy, Forbes.com, 26 June 2014
- Boatright, Kristen, High-Profile Names Help Istanbul Celebrate Arts and Culture, Artinfo.com, 19 June 2014
- Staff, Artist José Parlá Opens Up on His Miami, Artsy.com, 29 November 2013
- Murphy, Tim, Layering it as it Plays, The New York Times, 13 June 2013, p. E11
- Roffino, Sara, 29 Questions for Narrative Painter José Parlá, Artinfo.com, 13 May 2013
- Barrionuevo, Alexei, Is It Art, or Is It Just Real Estate?, The New York Times, 11 April 2013, p. RE4
- Wee, Darryl Jingwen, José Parlá's First Solo Show at Yuka Tsuruno, Artinfo.com, 5 April 2013
- Paginton, Fred, José Parlá's Broken Language, Whitewall, 20 February 2013
- Aguilar, Andrea, El Rey Cubano de Brooklyn, El Pais, 416 January 2013
- Cashdan, Marina, Memo From Miami: The Cuban Connection, The New York Times Style Blog, 7 December 2012
- Cembalest, Robin, Cuban Interest Section, Art News, 5 December 2012
- Cohen, Patricia, New Art for Brooklyn, The New York Times Arts Beat, 20 September 2012
- Parlá, José, Work In Progress, V Magazine, Fall 2012, p. 139
- Vogel, Carol, A Really Big Painting for BAM's New Theater, The New York Times, 3 August 2012
- Jaffe, Tali, José Parlá's ‘Character Gestures’ Opens at Ohwow in LA, WMagazine.com, September 2011
- Schiller, Sara, and Jiae Kim, José Parlá's Art Collection Theme Magazine, Issue 23, August 2011
- Laster, Paul, Review: José Parlá, ‘Walls, Diaries & Paintings’, Time Out New York, 4 April 2011
- Binlot, Ann, Asked & Answered: José Parlá, The New York Times Magazine Online, 18 March 2011
- Daquino, John Everett, The Urban Life Force, Artslant.com, 13 March 2011
- Balestin, Juliana, José Parlá at Bryce Wolkowitz, Purple Diary (France), 12 March 2011
- Slenske, Michael, Bomb, Memory: Q+A With José Parlá, Art in America, 7 March 2011
- Indrisek, Scott, The Writing on the Wall, Modern Painters, March 2011
- Rabinovitch, Simona, Calligraphic Coding, Nuovo Magazine, Spring 2011
- Rabinovitch, Simona, José Parlá Brings Massive Murals to Toronto, The Globe and Mail, 17 January 2011
- Pelleteri, Carissa, Featured Artists: José Parlá & Rey Parlá, Artcards.CC, 30 November 2010
- Dauriac, Romain, José Parlá, Clark Magazine (France), November–December 2010, pp. 28–29
- O’Byrne, Alix, José Parlá, L’Officiel Hommes (Paris), September 2010, p. 85
- Birchill-White, Alexandra, 2010's Wisest Resolution was to Fly to New York to Meet José Parlá, Aïe Magazine (Paris), Summer 2010
- Gleadell, Colin, Arts Market News, Telegraph.Co.UK, December 2009
- Garfield, Joey, José Parlá, Juxtapoz Magazine, December 2009, pp. 64–77
- Havis, Richard James, Off the Wall, South China Morning Post (Hong Kong), 17 May 2009, p. 10 Arts
- Parlá, Rey, José Parlá and the Bizen Pottery Tradition, The New Order, Issue 2, 2009, pp. 124–125
- Bryce, James, José Parlá, The New Order, Issue One, 2009, pp. 124–128
- Waltemath, Joan, José Parlá: Layered Days
- The Brooklyn Rail, December 2008
- Dauriac, Romain, José Parlá: Fragments de Memoires, Clark Magazine (France), November–December 2008, pp. 34–37
- Parlá, Rey, José Parlá Interview, The New Grand Tour Monograph, 2008
- Gavin, Francesca, State of Decay: José Parlá, Dazed & Confused, 2007, p. 158

== Publications ==
- Parlá, José (2011). Walls, Diaries and Paintings. Essays by Michael Betancourt, Isolde Brielmaier, and Greg Tate. Ostfildern: Hatje Cantz. ISBN 978-3-7757-2977-2. https://www.abebooks.com/9783775729772/
- JR; Parlá, José (2012). Wrinkles of the City, Havana, Cuba. Texts by Clara Astiasarán, Janet Batet, Michael Betancourt, and Jeffrey Deitch. Bologna: Damiani/Standard Press. ISBN 978-88-6208-250-1. https://www.artbook.com/9788862082501.html
- Parlá, José (2015). In Medias Res. Essays by Manon Slome, Greg Tate, Carlo McCormick, Michael Betancourt, and Isolde Brielmaier. Bologna: Damiani. ISBN 978-88-6208-362-1.https://www.damianibooks.com/en/products/6208362
- Parlá, José (2015). Segmented Realities. Essay by Michael Rooks. Bologna: Damiani. ISBN 978-88-6208-422-2. https://www.artbook.com/9788862084222.html
- Parlá, José (2017). Roots. Bologna: Damiani. ISBN 978-88-6208-563-2.https://www.amazon.com/Jos%C3%A9-Parl%C3%A1-Roots/dp/886208563X
- Parlá, José (2020). It's Yours. Essays by Henry Chalfant, Manon Slome, Naiomy M. Guerrero, and Joseph Mizzi. New York: The Bronx Museum of the Arts. https://parlastudios.com/products/its-yours
- Parlá, José (2023). Ciclos: Blooms of Mold. Foreword by Anne Pasternak. Bologna: Damiani. ISBN 978-88-6208-800-8.https://www.artbook.com/9788862088008.html
- Rider, Jonathan; de la Nuez, Iván (2025). José Parlá: Contemporary Palimpsests. Edited by Rey Parlá. Milan: Skira Editions.https://www.skira-arte.com/products/jose-parla-contemporary-palimpsests
