= Frankfurt on the Hudson =

1989 book by Steven Lowenstein

- Author: Steven M. Lowenstein
- Genre: Non-fiction
- Publisher: Wayne State University Press
- Publication date: 1989
- ISBN: 9780814323854

Frankfurt on the Hudson: The German-Jewish Community of Washington Heights, 1933-1983, Its structure and Culture is a scholarly book by Steven M. Lowenstein, Ph.D., about Jewish immigrants from Germany who settled in Washington Heights, a neighborhood in the New York City borough of Manhattan.

Dr. Lowenstein grew up in Washington Heights and returned to research the book, which was published in 1989 by Wayne State University Press. He writes in the introduction, "... I tried to reconstruct a picture of the process by which a traditionally community becomes less traditional. In the course of the study I came to the conclusion that the process of change was both slower and more complex than that suggested in the conventional picture of developments in modern Jewry. In this study of the German Jews of Washington Heights, I investigate the end result of the process of modernization of one group of German Jews. I do this with the full recognition that Washington Heights represents only one extreme of the spectrum of German Jewry."

Dr. Lowenstein was the Isadora Levine professor of Jewish history at the American Jewish University, which has campuses in Bel-Air and Brandeis, Calif. He earned his B.A. at the City College of New York and his M.A. and Ph.D. at Princeton University.

The neighborhood known as "Frankfurt-on-the-Hudson" became much more diverse in the 1970s and 1980s. In the 1990s it became known as Hudson Heights.

== See also ==
- Yekke
