= Rembert, Missouri =

Extinct hamlet in Missouri, U.S.

Coordinates: 37°14′35″N 92°32′52″W

Rembert is an extinct town in south central Wright County, in the Ozarks of southern Missouri. The site is approximately two miles west-southwest of Hartville and north of Missouri Route 38 and the Woods Fork of the Gasconade River.

A post office called Rembert was established in 1904, and remained in operation until 1915. The community has the name of the local Rembert family.
