= Catharine Rembert =

- Born: Catharine Phillips; April 22, 1905; Columbia, South Carolina
- Died: October 26, 1990 (aged 85); Tryon, North Carolina
- Occupations: Artist, designer, art educator
- Awards: Elizabeth O’Neill Verner Award, South Carolina Arts Commission

Catharine Phillips Rembert (April 22, 1905 – October 26, 1990) was an artist, designer and art educator best known as an important teacher and mentor of Jasper Johns, among others.

== Early life and education ==
Catharine Phillips Rembert was born in Columbia, SC, the daughter of John Franklin and Myrtis Smart Phillips. She grew up in Greenwood, South Carolina, where she attended art classes at Lander College, then a women’s school, while still in high school and briefly enrolled there before transferring to the University of South Carolina, where she became the first graduate of the fledgling art department in 1927.

== Career ==
Following her graduation, Catharine Phillips was hired as an instructor of design by the University Art Department, its third faculty member. In 1930, she married Allen Jones Rembert (1904–1951). Catharine Rembert remained on the Art Department faculty for the next 40 years, retiring in 1967 as assistant professor emeritus. During her years at the University, Rembert availed herself of opportunities to advance her study of art, including with André Lhote in Paris, Amédée Ozenfant in New York, Hans Hoffman in Provincetown, and at Parsons School of Design and the San Francisco Art Institute. She incorporated modernist methods of teaching into her own. Among Rembert’s students were numerous who went on to significant careers in art and design, including Sigmund Abeles, J. Bardin, Blue Sky, Aldwyth, and most notably, Jasper Johns, whom Rembert mentored for three semesters, from the time he started at the University in 1947, until he left for New York at her urging in 1948; the two remained close until Rembert’s death. After retirement, she continued teaching children’s classes at the Richland Art School and the Columbia Museum of Art School, with both of which institutions she had longstanding affiliations.

== Work ==
Catharine Rembert, although she considered herself more a designer than a painter, was an active member of and regularly exhibited paintings with the Columbia Artists’ Guild. She was a versatile designer of textiles for commercial firms, costumes and stage sets for theater and opera, graphic design, and large-scale decoration in conjunction with architect Phelps Bultman, as well as an occasional illustrator, including of the Swampy series of children’s books by Zan Heyward.

== Selected exhibitions ==
- “Morse-Wittkowsky-Rembert,” Columbia Museum of Art, 1953
- “Catharine Rembert/Augusta Wittkowsky: Concentric Circles.” McKissick Museum, University of South Carolina, 1989
- “Abstract Art in South Carolina, 1949-2012.” South Carolina State Museum, 2012

== Selected corporate and public commissions ==
- Mosaic Mural interior and exterior of the former SCE&G building, Columbia SC, Phelps Bultman, architect, ca. 1973
- Relief of copper tubing and wire, Columbia Metropolitan Airport, Phelps Bultman, architect
- Carved and glazed brick panels on J. Drake Edens Library, Columbia College, Phelps Bultman, architect
- Mural, Vorhees College, Denmark, SC

== Awards and recognition ==
Elizabeth O’Neill Verner Award for lifetime achievement in the arts, SC Arts Commission, 1989–90

== Public collections ==
- Columbia Museum of Art
- McKissick Museum, University of South Carolina
