= Gerard Francis Tempest =

American painter, sculptor, architect

Gerard Francis Tempest (February 23, 1918 – July 26, 2009) was a painter, sculptor, architect and veteran of World War II. Tempest was the father of Abstract Spiritualism and the protégé of Giorgio de Chirico, the forerunner of Surrealism.

Born in San Donato Val di Comino, Italy in 1918, Tempest immigrated to the United States in 1929. He studied art as a youth at the Boston Museum School, founding his own sign-painting company at the age of 19.

Drafted in 1943 as a private in the United States Army, Tempest eventually became an officer, serving under Omar Bradley in the 82nd Airborne Division. Tempest fought in campaigns in Europe, including Normandy on D-Day, the Battle of Hürtgen Forest, the Battle of the Bulge, and with the French Underground in the Liberation of Paris. Tempest received the Bronze Star Medal in 1944 and designed the 101st Airborne Division's insignia, the "Screaming Eagle".

Returning to the Boston Museum School in 1945, Tempest studied under abstract expressionists Max Beckmann and Oscar Kokoschka. He later studied under Giorgio de Chirico as his protégé in Rome. There in 1957 he first introduced Abstract Spiritualism. He continued to paint for the rest of his life, with major exhibitions in the United States, France and Italy.

Between 1958 and 1963, Tempest designed and built the Villa Tempesta in Chapel Hill, North Carolina. Noted for its beauty, the villa was designed from remnants of two 19th-century mansions torn down in urban renewal projects in the 1950s. Starting in the mid-1960s and continuing for two decades, Villa Tempesta (now known as Villa T'eo) housed a restaurant noted for fine cuisine. Renamed to Whitehall at the Villa, it today contains the Whitehall Shop and Tranquil Corners Antiques.

He received the gold medal at the Cannes Art Festival in 1987 and was honored by the Holy See in having his work becoming a part of the permanent collection of the Vatican Museum in 1982 and 1990. In 2009 the South Carolina legislature honored him with a resolution citing his work as an artist and as a veteran.

Tempest died in his sleep in Myrtle Beach, South Carolina on July 26, 2009.
