= Manfred Kirchheimer =

German-American documentary filmmaker (1931–2024)

- Born: Manfred Alexander Kirchheimer; March 2, 1931; Saarbrücken, Territory of the Saar Basin
- Died: July 16, 2024 (aged 93); New York City, U.S.
- Occupations: Filmmaker; Professor
- Known for: Documentary film making
- Spouse: Gloria DeVidas
- Children: 2

Manfred Alexander Kirchheimer (March 2, 1931 – July 16, 2024) was an American documentary film maker and professor of film at the School of Visual Arts in New York City. He previously taught at NYIT. He was born in Saarbrücken, Germany, and his family moved to New York City in 1936 to escape Nazi Germany. After receiving a B.A. from the City College of New York in 1952, he worked primarily as a film editor and he also began making his own films. A major theme in many of his documentaries is urban life. His most notable documentaries include: Stations of the Elevated, We Were So Beloved, Tall: The American Skyscraper and Louis Sullivan, and Art Is... The Permanent Revolution.

== Biography ==
Manfred Alexander Kirchheimer was born to a Jewish family in Saarbrücken in 1931. In 1936, his family fled to the United States from Nazi Germany, settling in Washington Heights, Manhattan, New York. After arriving, he attended the New York City Public Schools. Upon graduating high school, he began studying film production with Hans Richter at the Hans Richter Institute of Film Techniques at the City College of New York from 1948 to 1952, receiving a B.A.

For the next 24 years, Kirchheimer worked as an editor, director, and camera operator in the New York film industry. He edited on over 300 films for ABC, CBS, NBC, and National Educational Television. The subjects of these films ranged from cultural to biographical. During these years, he also financed his own independent films while also working with Hans Richter and Jay Leyda on films. In 1963, he was a camera operator for Leo Hurwitz.

In the 1970s, Kirchheimer became a professor at the School of Visual Arts in New York City where he taught film production; he was part of the faculty for the next four decades. However, after making the documentary We Were So Beloved (1985), he stepped away from filmmaking until 2006, when he embraced digital film editing and returned with Tall: The American Skyscraper and Louis Sullivan. This began a new flurry of activity, which continued as late as 2022, as he made new projects and worked with old footage he had shot decades before.

=== Personal life and death ===
Kirchheimer was married to the former Gloria DeVidas, and had two children. He died from cancer at his home on the Upper West Side of Manhattan, on July 16, 2024, at the age of 93.

== Filmography ==
=== Style ===
Kirchheimer's films typically focus on aspects of urban life. His films have been described as "hopeful, yet they admonish for the future". He typically uses written commentary on screen rather than voice-over in his films. He often creates complex layerings of sound to create novel sound environments rather than the sound at the actual scene. About his audience he has said

I trust my audience. I am eager for the audience to work, and not lose themselves while they are watching my films [... they should be] able to hold on to their own integrity and insights so they don't leave their intelligence behind. When viewers leave the theater they will be walking into the same world they just left, not one unconnected to the film they've seen.

Kirchheimer did not typically collaborate with other filmmakers, saying:

I don't have to keep appointments with anybody. I don't have to say we'll meet tomorrow. I don't have to argue with anybody. Just, you know, it's not that I'm a one man band, it's just that I like to think things through. I like the challenge of it.

=== Funding ===
According to Kirchheimer, most of the films he has made he paid for himself. His first film Colossus on the River cost about $3,500 to make. The first grant he received was $10,000 to make Stations of the Elevated, which he said paid for about half of the film. He also received grants to make We Were So Beloved, which paid for some but not all of the film making. Kirchheimer stated that he probably can make documentaries at lower cost than others because his former students help him without pay, but if he ever does make money from a film, they will get some of the proceeds. Kirchheimer stated in 2010 that he has never made back the money he has spent on his films.

=== Films ===
Year	Film	Description	Credit
1963	Colossus on the River	The documentary attempts to capture the passing of an era by filming the docking of a large ocean liner.	Director, producer, writer, editor, Camera
1965	Haiku	The documentary captures dances by Jane Dudley.	Director
1967	Leroy Douglas	The documentary captures the reactions of workers in New York's Garment District to the death of their black colleague in Vietnam.	Co-filmmaker with Peter Eliscu
1968	Claw	The central theme of this documentary is that contemporary urban development subordinates human values to economic values.	Co-director (with Walter Hess), producer, editor, cinematographer (with Walter Hess)
1973	Short Circuit	This documentary focuses on the reaction of a white, middle-class male, during the peak of the Black Power movement, to the movement of black people and culture into his neighborhood.	Director, producer, writer, cinematographer
1975	Bridge High	The documentary is a choreographed song of praise to a suspension bridge filmed in black and white.	Director (with Walter Hess), producer, writer, cinematographer (With Walter Hess), editor
1980	Stations of the Elevated	The documentary focuses on the graffiti on elevated trains and their symbolism in modern society.	Director, editor, cinematographer, producer, writer, sound
1986	We Were So Beloved	A documentary film about Jews who talk about Germans who helped them escape the Holocaust.	Director, producer, writer, editor, cinematographer (James Calanan and Steve Juliano)
2004	Tall: The American Skyscraper and Louis Sullivan	The documentary tells the story of how Louis Sullivan designed skyscrapers.	Director, producer, writer, editor, cinematographer
2007	Spraymasters	This documentary focuses on four ex-graffiti artists (now in their 40s) who earlier in their lives crept into the rail yards in the New York City Subway, and painted subway cars in these yards. Spraymasters is a follow-up to Stations of the Elevated.	Director
2012	Art Is... The Permanent Revolution	This documentary explores how politics and how artists of the past have influenced four artists.	Director, editor, producer, sound
2015	Canners	an ode to the men and women who earn their daily bread by diligently collecting New York City's cans and bottles.	Director, producer, cinematographer, editor
2017	My Coffee with Jewish Friends	A series of conversations with Jewish people from all walks of life, discussing their heritage and faith as it relates to history and today's world.	Director, producer, editor
2018	Dream of a City	16mm film from Wall Street to midtown New York to the Delaware River documenting the activities at a huge construction site, street life in Hell's Kitchen, New York harbor traffic, and rare glimpses of nature.	Director, producer, writer, cinematographer, editor
2019	Free Time	The changing landscape of New York City over the years, urban renewal to rubble.	Director, producer, cinematographer, editor

== Awards and grants ==
Kirchheimer received a number of awards and grants for his documentary films including awards from: Athens International Film Festival, Yale Film Festival, American Film Festival, RiverRun International Film Festival, Ciné Golden Eagle, American Film Institute, National Endowment for the Arts, National Endowment for the Humanities, and New York State Council on the Arts.
