= Ann Chernow =

American artist

- Born: Ann Levy; February 1, 1936 (age 90); New York City, US
- Known for: Painting, lithography, etching, silkscreen

Ann Chernow (née Levy; born February 1, 1936) is an American artist who is known for her portrait-style illustrations that evoke the images of female cinematic figures of the 1930s and 1940s. Born and raised in New York City, Chernow studied music and art from a young age and acquired an affinity for the arts. Chernow was exposed to several movies that left a lasting impression and prompted her to make the likenesses of leading ladies. Bette Davis, Joan Crawford, Norma Shearer and Katharine Hepburn were the subjects of some of her works in the late 1990s. In most of her works, however, Chernow avoids specificity, choosing instead to portray universal situations through figures who are inspired by film but reinterpreted to transcend stereotypes. Chernow has worked extensively in the mediums of lithography, silkscreen, etching, and colored pencil. She currently resides in Westport, Connecticut, and serves her community through the arts.

== Early life and education ==
Born in New York City, to Mollie Citrin and Edward Levy, Chernow was the oldest of three girls. Her mother was an amateur singer and her father was a performing violinist, so she and her sisters received music and art lessons as children; Ann began at the age of five. Her first formal art education was at the Memorial Art Gallery in Rochester in the early 1940s, where she attended art classes in the museum galleries. After her family moved to Flushing in 1946, she studied under a local Italian painter, Giuseppe Trotta. Years after taking lessons with Trotta, Chernow eventually entered the School of Fine Arts at Syracuse University in 1953, but transferred soon after to New York University, where she earned her Master of Arts degree in 1969.

As an undergraduate and graduate at NYU (1955–69), Chernow studied under the direction of several artists. Her instructors and mentors included Howard Conant, Jules Olitski, Irving Sandler, Lawrence Alloway and Hale Woodruff, all of whom influenced her through their teachings and artistic viewpoints. Toward the end of her academic education and for a few years afterwards, she worked for the art educator Victor D’Amico, and taught at the studio school of the Museum of Modern Art (1966–71).

== Personal life ==
After completing her undergraduate degree at NYU in 1957, Chernow married her first husband, Phil Chenok, and had two sons, David (b. 1959) and Daniel (b. 1964). The couple divorced in 1969, when Chernow was enrolled in graduate school. While studying with Howard Conant, she met her second husband, Burt Chernow, with whom she subsequently worked at the Museum of Modern Art. Burt Chernow was an art historian and professor at Housatonic Community College, where he founded the Housatonic Museum of Art in 1967. The couple married in 1970 and remained together until his death in 1997. She was the life partner of actor Martin West until his death on 31 Dec 2019.

== Work ==
In the 1950s, Chernow's style was centered on colorful abstractions, which were influenced by Jean Dubuffet, who was famous during that period. She subsequently dabbled in a variety of styles in the 1970s, including huge billboard paintings, sepia drawings of individual women and colored pencil drawings. Already in 1968, she had begun to explore lithography, although she only began to work seriously in printmaking (both lithography and etching) in 1978. She reached the height of her career with a number of evocative paintings in the late 1980s and early 1990s, which depicted starlets of the 1930s and 1940s, as in Artist and Models (1998). In these later works, Chernow used close-ups of women who were quickly passed by the camera, as opposed to celebrated stars of the screen. Chernow aims to reveal the "unsentimental truth" in her art by showing an image that jogs a memory and brings about a nostalgia which her viewers can understand because they see something familiar.
