= Fahamu Pecou =

American painter

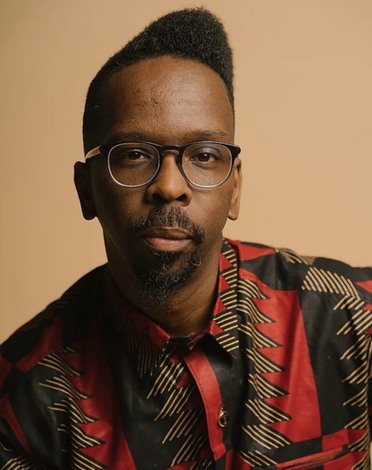
- Born: June 25, 1975 (age 51); Brooklyn, New York
- Education: Atlanta College of Art
- Known for: Visual artist
- Notable work: Pursuit of Happiness, Imagining New Worlds, Grav•i•ty, I Know Why the Caged Bird Blings and Talking Drum.
- Style: Painting, Canvas

Fahamu Pecou (born June 25, 1975) is an American painter and scholar. He is known for producing works that combine aspects of Fine art and Hip-hop. Most of his works engage representations of black masculinity and identity.

== Early life and education ==
Pecou was born in Brooklyn, New York, in 1975 to Alphonso Pecou and Betty Ann Ridges. His father's extended family had moved from Panama to Brooklyn, and his mother had moved with her brother from Hartsville, South Carolina. The couple met when she moved into an apartment in the brownstone that the Pecou family owned. Prior to Pecou's birth, Alphonso Pecou enlisted in the United Negro Improvement Association, and moved his family to Virgin Gorda before returning to Brooklyn.

When Pecou was four years old, his father murdered his mother after being diagnosed with schizophrenia and being repeatedly institutionalized. He and his siblings were sent to live with a relative in Hartsville, South Carolina, where he produced comic strips centered around the superhero, "Black Man."

Pecou graduated with a B.F.A in Painting and Digital Media from the Atlanta College of Art in 1997. He received his M.A. from Emory University's Institute of Liberal Arts in 2017 and his Ph.D. from Emory University in 2018.

== Career ==
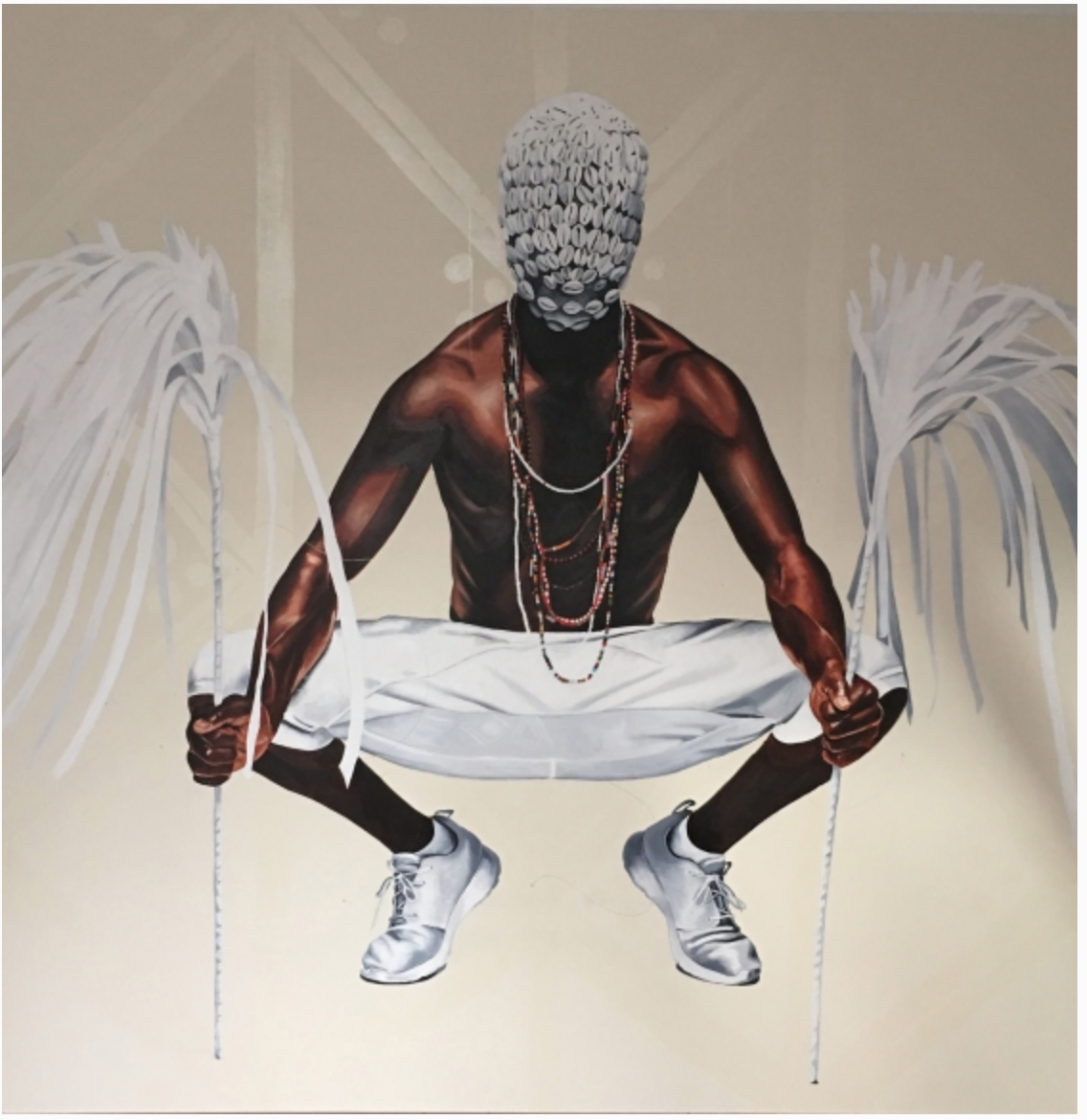
The Return, 2016

Pecou commenced his career as a graphic designer, creating promotional materials for nightclubs, restaurants, politicians, as well as hip hop artists and music labels. During his work with rap artists, Pecou observed the marketing strategies employed in the hip hop industry and began incorporating these techniques into his own artistic practice. His early paintings juxtaposed the bold and assertive demeanor of hip hop culture with the more traditional and conservative art world. In recent years, Pecou's work has concentrated on contemporary representations of black masculinity and identity.

Pecou employs acrylic paint on canvas, video, music, performance art, and academic writings to investigate the complexities and intersections of hip-hop culture and black masculinity. His works display the spirit of modern-day Black America and also depict the history and culture of the African diaspora. They are known to be bold, bright and confrontational with inherent political undertone.

Notable series within Pecou's body of work include Pursuit of Happiness (2013), Imagining New Worlds (2015), Grav•i•ty (2014), I Know Why the Caged Bird Blings (2015) and Talking Drum (2016). Pecou's works are featured in major national and international galleries, museums and collections such as: the Smithsonian National Museum of African American History and Culture, the High Museum of Art, Société Générale (Paris), Nasher Museum of Art at Duke University, Paul R. Jones Collection, Clark Atlanta University Art Collection, Museum of Contemporary Art of Georgia, and several others both in the private and public sectors.

Pecou engages in regular solo and group art exhibition across the globe. He also holds public lectures and speaking engagements at colleges and museums across the US. In addition to his own work, Pecou has curated notable exhibitions, including RiTES at the Zuckerman Museum at Kennesaw State University. In 2015, Pecou was selected by the City of Atlanta's Office of Cultural Affairs to curate ELEVATE Atlanta; the city’s annual public arts festival.

Starting in 2015, Pecou has also collaborated with the organizations WonderRoot, MARTA, Fulton County Arts and Culture, and the TransFormation Alliance to revitalize select MARTA stations by painting murals. The stations that will participate in this En Route program include the King Memorial, Oakland City, Hamilton E. Holmes, and Ashby stations. The goal of the project is to make the stations more inviting and encourage a sense of community. The project received $50,000 from the National Endowment for the Arts. So far, murals by Pecou have been painted at the King Memorial Station, the Ashby Station, and the Oakland City Station.

On Saturday, September 8, 2018, Pecou's studio was destroyed in a fire while he was traveling abroad.

== Awards ==
- Caversham Fellowship, Atlanta, GA, 2008
- Working Artist Fellowship, Museum of Contemporary Art of Georgia, 2013-2014
- Artadia Award, Atlanta, GA, 2009
- Artist-in-Residence at McColl Center for Art + Innovation in Charlotte, North Carolina, 2010
- Emerging Artist Award, NBAF Impressions, 2011
- West Collects Prize, West Collection, 2012
- Nellie Mae Rowe Fellowship, Hambidge Center for Creative Arts and Sciences, 2013
- Robert A. Paul Award, Emory University, 2015
- Painters and Sculptors Award, Joan Mitchell Foundation, 2016

== See also ==
- Fine art
- Virtual art
- The Art of Painting
- Art Papers
- José Parlá
- Museum of Contemporary Art of Georgia
