= Nord-sud.com =

2007 film

- Directed by: François Ducat
- Screenplay by: François Ducat
- Produced by: Les Productions du Lagon, Iota Productions, RTBF, France 3, WIP
- Cinematography: Bernard Verstraete
- Edited by: Marie-Hélène Mora
- Music by: Warner Chappell Music France
- Release date: 2007
- Running time: 52 minutes
- Countries: Belgium; France

Nord-sud.com is a 2007 documentary film.

== Synopsis ==
The Internet has revolutionized the relations between people and continents. In Cameroon, it's a phenomenon: it has become some sort of El Dorado for young women from Cameroon who dream of helping their families thanks to a white husband. Josy, Sylvie and Mireille tried their luck at countless cybercafés in Yaoundé and live happily with their "whites" in Wallonia, Flanders and the Pyrenees. Others, like Natalie, weren't so lucky and had to go back home after a bad experience.

== Awards ==
- Festival International du Film Indépendant (Bruselas, 2008)
