= Lal Galiyare Se =

Lal Galiyare Se (लाल गलियारे से) is a 3-episode series on left-wing extremism and its effects on the development of Indian states. It won News and Television Award for best Hindi news documentary 2014.

== Overview ==
Lal Galiyare Se is a 3-episode news documentary series produced to highlight and emphasize the issue of left-wing extremism or Naxalism spread over 150 districts of India. The Indian government has already proclaimed this issue the single biggest internal security threat.

Two correspondents Omprakash Das and Sudhir Kumar traveled across major naxal affected areas (Chhattisgarh, Jharkhand and Andhra Pradesh) and found some untold stories of local people and government development efforts.

== Episodes ==
Each episode had a duration of c. 27–28 minutes. The first two episodes were shown on 24 and 31 August 2013, and the last episode was broadcast on 14 September.
