= On the Trail with Miss Snail Pail =

- Directed by: Greg Young
- Produced by: Golden Bear Casting
- Starring: Colleen Flanigan
- Release date: 10 January 2009
- Running time: 12 minutes
- Language: English

On the Trail with Miss Snail Pail is a 2009 short documentary film that follows Colleen Flanigan, aka Miss Snail Pail, as she provides a snail removal service that recycles the garden pests into food.

On the Trail's first festival screening was at the 2009 Tucson Slow Food & Film Festival in Arizona. The film was also selected for screening by the 2009 Modesto Reel Food Film Festival in California, the 2009 Colorado Environmental Film Festival in Golden, Colorado, and the 2011 9th Annual Wild and Scenic Film Festival in Nevada City, California.
