= Timbrels and Torahs =

2000 film

Timbrels and Torah
- Directed by: Judith Montell; Miriam Chaya
- Written by: Judith Montell; Miriam Chaya
- Produced by: Judith Montell; Miriam Chaya
- Release date: 2000
- Running time: 36 min.
- Country: United States
- Language: English

Timbrels and Torahs is a 2000 American documentary film written, produced and directed by Judith Montell and Miriam Chaya. The film explains a new Jewish ritual designed to celebrate women on their 60th birthday.
