= Daughters of Dolma =

- Directed by: Adam Miklos
- Produced by: Alex Co.
- Release date: 2013

Daughters of Dolma is a feature-length documentary about spirituality, modernity and gender issues as embodied by Tibetan Buddhist nuns at a monastery in Nepal. It is directed by Adam Miklos and produced by Alex Co.
