= Saigon, U.S.A. =

Saigon, U.S.A. is a 2004 documentary film about Vietnamese Americans that live in the United States. It was produced and directed by Lindsey Jang and Robert C. Winn and has a duration of 57 minutes.
