= List of National Geographic documentary films =

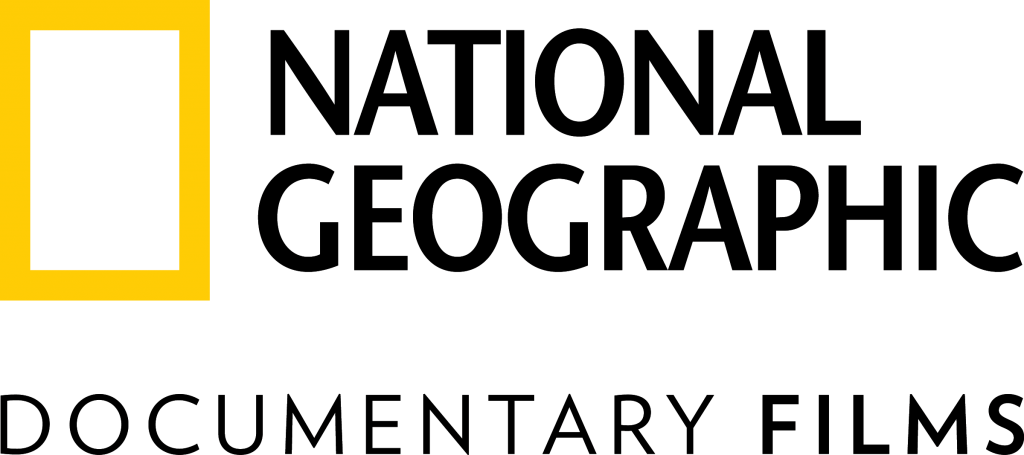

This is a list of films produced and released by National Geographic under their feature Documentary Films banner, established in 2017. National Geographic Partners is a joint venture between The Walt Disney Company and National Geographic Society, initially established between 21st Century Fox and the National Geographic Society until Disney's acquisition of Fox's media assets on March 20, 2019.

| Title | Director(s) | Release date | Notes |
|---|---|---|---|
| LA 92 | Daniel Lindsay, T. J. Martin | April 28, 2017 | co-production with Lightbox |
| Jane | Brett Morgen | October 20, 2017 | co-production with Public Road Productions |
| Into the Okavango | Neil Gelinas | April 22, 2018 | |
| Free Solo | Elizabeth Chai Vasarhelyi, Jimmy Chin | September 28, 2018 | co-production with Parkes+MacDonald Image Nation, Little Monster Films, and Itinerant Media |
| Science Fair | Cristina Costantini, Darren Foster | October 19, 2018 | co-production with Univision and Muck Media |
| Paris to Pittsburgh | Sidney Beaumont, Micheal Bonfiglio | December 12, 2018 | |
| Sea of Shadows | Richard Ladkani | July 12, 2019 | Co-production with Terra Mater Factual Studios, Appian Way Productions, Malaika Pictures, and The Wild Lens Collective |
| The Cave | Feras Fayyad | October 18, 2019 | co-production with Danish Documentary, SWR, TV2, Doha Film Institute, IMS, Hecat Studio, and ma.ja.de Film |
| Saudi Runaway | Susanne Regina Meures | January 25, 2020 | distribution only |
| Rebuilding Paradise | Ron Howard | July 31, 2020 | co-production with Imagine Documentaries |
| The Last Ice | Scott Ressler | May 22, 2020 | |
| Akashinga: The Brave Ones | Maria Wilhelm | June 17, 2020 | "Doc short" co-production with Avatar Alliance Foundation |
| The Nightcrawlers | Alexander A. Mora | September 13, 2020 | "Doc short", co-production with Violet Films, Genius Loki, and Doc Society |
| Lost and Found | Orlando von Einsiedel | September 18, 2020 | "Doc short" co-production with Rideback and Grain Media |
| Blood on the Wall | Sebastian Junger, Nick Quested | September 30, 2020 | Cc-production with Junger Quested, Diamond Docs, Goldcrest Features, and Lone Wolf |
| City So Real | Steve James | October 29, 2020 | Released as miniseries; co-production with Participant and Kartemquin Films |
| Own the Room | Cristina Costantini, Darren Foster | March 12, 2021 | Disney+ original; co-production with Shopify Studios |
| Rise Again: Tulsa and the Red Summer | Dawn Porter | June 18, 2021 | |
| Playing with Sharks: The Valerie Taylor Story | Sally Aitken | July 23, 2021 | Disney+ original; co-production with Screen Australia, Dogwoof, Screen NSW, TDog Productions, Madman Films, and Wildbear Entertainment |
| Fauci | John Hoffman, Janet Tobias | October 6, 2021 | co-production with Story Syndicate, Sierra Tango, Better World Projects, and Diamond Docs |
| The First Wave | Matthew Heineman | October 7, 2021 | |
| The Rescue | Elizabeth Chai Vasarhelyi, Jimmy Chin | October 8, 2021 | co-production with Ventureland, Storyteller Productions, Little Monster Films, and Passion Pictures |
| Becoming Cousteau | Liz Garbus | October 22, 2021 | co-production with Story Syndicate, The Cousteau Society, ACE Content and Diamond Docs |
| Torn | Max Lowe | December 3, 2021 | |
| We Feed People | Ron Howard | May 27, 2022 | co-production with Imagine Documentaries |
| Fire of Love | Sara Dosa | July 6, 2022 | distribution only |
| The Territory | Alex Pritz | August 19, 2022 | |
| Retrograde | Matthew Heinemann | September 3, 2022 | |
| The Flagmakers | Cynthia Wade, Sharon Liese | September 16, 2022 | Disney+ original |
| Wild Life | Elizabeth Chai Vasarhelyi, Jimmy Chin | April 14, 2023 | |
| Bobi Wine: The People's President | Moses Bwayo, Christopher Sharp | July 28, 2023 | distribution only |
| The Mission | Amanda McBaine, Jesse Moss | October 13, 2023 | |
| The Space Race: The Untold Story of the First Black Astronauts | Lisa Cortés, Diego Hurtado de Mendoza | February 12, 2024 | co-production with K/M Documentaries |
| Sugarcane | Julian Brave NoiseCat, Emily Kassie | August 9, 2024 | |
| Fly | Christina Clusiau, Shaul Schwartz | September 2, 2024 | |
| Blink | Edmund Stenson, Daniel Roher | October 4, 2024 | co-production with MRC, Fishbowl Films, and Eyesteel Film, distributed by Walt Disney Studios Motion Pictures through the Walt Disney Pictures banner in North America. |
| Sally | Cristina Costantini | June 16, 2025 | |
| Lost in the Jungle | Elizabeth Chai Vasarhelyi, Jimmy Chin, Juan Camilo Cruz | September 12, 2025 | co-production with Little Monster Films and Lightbox |
| Love+War | Elizabeth Chai Vasarhelyi, Jimmy Chin | October 29, 2025 | |
| The Tale of Silyan | Tamara Kotevska | November 28, 2025 | co-production with Concordia Studio, The Corner Shop and Ciconia Film |
| Ghost Elephants | Werner Herzog | February 27, 2026 | distribution only |
| Time And Water | Sara Dosa | May 29, 2026 | co-production with Sandbox Films and Signpost Pictures; distributed by 1-2 Special in North America |
| Everest: The Other Side | Elizabeth Chai Vasarhelyi, Jimmy Chin | October 30, 2026 | co-production with Little Monster Films |
Awaiting release
| Untitled Aron Ralston documentary | James Marsh | 2027 | co-production with Magna Studios |
| Untitled Carl Sagan documentary | Nanette Burstein | TBA | co-production with Fuzzy Door Productions and Hungry Man Productions |
