= A Killer Story =

2026 documentary series

- Genre: Documentary
- Directed by: Matthew Galkin
- Music by: James Lavino
- Country of origin: United States
- Original language: English
- No. of episodes: 3

Production
- Executive producers: Matthew Galkin; Joshua Levine; Liz Garbus; Dan Cogan; Jon Bardin; Kate Barry; Julie Gather; Davis Guggenheim; Jonathan Silberberg; Nicole Stott; Nancy Abraham; Lisa Heller; Tina Nguyen
- Producer: Joe Sexton
- Cinematography: Jeff Hutchens
- Editors: Ross Hockrow; Drew Blatman; James Pilott; Evan Wise
- Running time: 39-40 minutes
- Production companies: HBO Documentary Films; Story Syndicate; Concordia Studio; Fairhaven

Original release
- Network: HBO
- Release: September 10 – September 24, 2026

A Killer Story is a 2026 American documentary series directed and executive produced by Matthew Galkin. It follows investigative journalist Joe Sexton over the course of six years as he investigates accused murderer Dana Chandler after being pursued by two citizen sleuths.

It premiered on September 10, 2026, on HBO.

== Premise ==
Investigative journalist Joe Sexton receives thousands of emails from citizen sleuth Eileen Umbehr, a woman convinced accused murderer Dana Chandler is innocent. Spanning three trials, complex tales of family conflicts, competing narratives, Sexton discovers the truth is more elusive. The series additionally explores the effects of true crime obsession.

== Episodes ==
No.	Title >	Directed by	Original release date	U.S. viewers (millions)
1	"Welcome to Topeka"	Matthew Galkin	September 10, 2026	N/A
2	"Person of Interest"	Matthew Galkin	September 17, 2026	N/A
3	"A Dangerous Notion"	Matthew Galkin	September 24, 2026	N/A

== Production ==
Liz Garbus, Dan Cogan, and Davis Guggenheim are among the executive producers under their Story Syndicate and Concordia Studio banners, respectively.

== Reception ==
=== Critical reception ===
On the review aggregator website Rotten Tomatoes, the series holds an approval rating of 100%, based on 5 reviews.

Joel Keller of Decider suggested viewing the series writing: "A Killer Story is as much about the people investigating Dana Chandler’s case as it is about the case itself. It’s a refreshing docuseries that takes some interesting turns." Jonathon Wilson of Ready Steady Cut wrote: "Through its unique perspective and righteous anger, A Killer Story raises some important questions about the legal system that are well worth a closer examination."

== Accolades ==
Award	Date	Category	Recipient(s)	Result	Ref.
Critics' Choice Documentary Awards	November 8, 2026	Best True Crime Documentary	A Killer Story	Nominated	
