= Children of the Underground =

Documentary series

- Genre: Documentary
- Directed by: Gabriela Cowperthwaite, Ted Gesing
- Music by: Ariel Marx
- Country of origin: United States
- Original language: English
- No. of episodes: 5

Production
- Executive producers: Jon Bardin; Kate Barry; Dan Cogan; Gabriela Cowperthwaite; Liz Garbus; Ted Gesing
- Producers: Grace Fardella; Giona Jefferson
- Cinematography: Keri Oberly; Jonathan Ingalls; Thorsten Thielow; Helge Gerull
- Editors: Krystalline Armendariz; Stefanie Maridueña; Jessica Miller; Michael Culyba; Jeremy Stulberg
- Production company: Story Syndicate

Original release
- Network: FX
- Release: August 12, 2022

Not to be confused with the book by Russian writer Korolenko "Children of the Underground", Children of the Underground is a five episode documentary series from FX on Faye Yager and the underground network she created to assist mothers of sexually abused children to relocate and to hide from their abusers. Yager was inspired to found the organization after losing custody of her daughter to her husband, pedophile Roger Lee Jones. Jones later became the first fugitive fleeing charges of child sexual abuse to end up on the FBI's most wanted list and was later captured at a campground.

== Summary ==
The series features interviews with Yager, her daughter, Gloria Steinem, Sally Jessy Raphael, and others, including women and children who were a part of Yager's network. Episode one explains the historical context, the role of daytime television in lifting up the voices of women and the issues they faced, and introduces the network and its issues with law enforcement. Episode two shares the story of Yager's own criminal trial and her daughter's experience. It chronicles Yager's libel suit after heckling psychologist Lawrence D. Spiegel on the Geraldo talk show and decreased reliance on medical evidence before assisting fugitive mothers. Episode three shows increased belief in Satanic rituals in child abuse cases. Episode four continues the conflicts from critics and the press. Episode five concludes with a major lawsuit against the organization and provides updates on where many participants in the series are in the present.
