= Taken: Natalee Holloway =

2026 documentary series

- Genre: Documentary
- Directed by: Dani Sloane; Matthew Galkin
- Country of origin: United States
- Original language: English
- No. of episodes: 3

Production
- Executive producers: Dani Sloane; Liz Garbus; Dan Cogan; Jon Bardin; Tommy Coriale
- Running time: 36-39 minutes
- Production company: Story Syndicate

Original release
- Network: Netflix
- Release: November 4, 2026

Taken: Natalee Holloway is a 2026 American documentary series directed by Dani Sloane and Matthew Galkin for Netflix. It premiered on November 4, 2026.

== Premise ==
Explores the Disappearance of Natalee Holloway and her mother, Beth's decades long search for answers.

== Production ==
In December 2025, it was announced Netflix had ordered a three-part documentary series revolving around the Disappearance of Natalee Holloway, with Matthew Galkinand Dani Sloane set to direct, and Liz Garbus and Dan Cogan among the executive producers under their Story Syndicate banner.
