= Number One on the Call Sheet =

2025 documentary film

- Film poster
- Directed by: Reginald Hudlin; Shola Lynch
- Produced by: Jamie Foxx; Dan Cogan; Datari Turner; Kevin Hart
- Production companies: Foxx Hole Productions; Story Syndicate; Whoop, Inc.; Hartbeat Productions
- Distributed by: Apple TV+
- Release date: March 28, 2025
- Country: United States
- Language: English

Number One on the Call Sheet is a 2025 American two-part documentary film directed by Reginald Hudlin and Shola Lynch. The film explores the experiences of leading Black actors in Hollywood, with part one centered on Black men and part two on Black women. It was released on March 28, 2025 on Apple TV+.

== Synopsis ==
"Through candid interviews and exclusive access, the film explores the actors' breakthrough moments, strategies for success, and their perspectives on the future of Black talent in Hollywood."

The title of the documentary refers to the top-billed star of a film, whose name is listed first on the production's call sheet.

== Episodes ==
No.	Title	Directed by	Original release date	Notes
1.a	Number One on the Call Sheet: Black Leading Men in Hollywood	Reginald Hudlin	March 28, 2025	Celebrities interviewed include Denzel Washington, Dwayne "The Rock" Johnson, Idris Elba, Jamie Foxx, Kevin Hart, Eddie Murphy, and Will Smith.
1.b	Number One on the Call Sheet: Black Leading Women in Hollywood	Shola Lynch	March 28, 2025	Celebrities interviewed include Angela Bassett, Halle Berry, Whoopi Goldberg, Gabrielle Union, Viola Davis, Alfre Woodard, Octavia Spencer, Tessa Thompson, and Nia Long.

== Production ==
On April 21, 2021, it was announced that Apple acquired the films, produced by Jamie Foxx for Foxx Hole Productions, Dan Cogan for Story Syndicate, and Datari Turner and Kevin Hart through Hartbeat. Reginald Hudlin and Bryan Smiley are executive producers for both films. Halle Berry, Viola Davis, Whoopi Goldberg and Angela Bassett serve as executive producers and also provide commentary in Part Two. Part Two is directed by Shola Lynch.

== Release ==
A trailer was released February 27, 2025. Number One on the Call Sheet premiered on March 28, 2025 on Apple TV+.

== Reception ==
On the review aggregator website Rotten Tomatoes, 100% of 11 critics' reviews are positive, with an average rating of 8.4/10. The website's consensus reads: "Brimming with memorable anecdotes and keen insights into the breaking of glass ceilings, Number One of the Call Sheet (sic) is an entertaining victory lap that still recognizes how much road ahead is left."
