= Rapinoe (film) =

2026 documentary film

- Directed by: Rebeca Huntt
- Produced by: Rebeca Huntt; Dan Cogan; Zoe Potkin; Kate Barry
- Cinematography: Derek Howard; Alejandro Mejia Gavino; Sophia Stieglitz; Sean Mattison; Tony Hardmon
- Edited by: Gabriel Rhodes; Isabel Freeman
- Music by: Chanell Crichlow; T. Griffin
- Production companies: Story Syndicate; Impact Partners
- Distributed by: HBO Documentary Films
- Release date: September 10, 2026 (TIFF)
- Running time: 92 minutes
- Countries: United States; United Kingdom
- Language: English

Rapinoe is a 2026 documentary film directed and produced by Rebeca Huntt. It explores the life and career of Megan Rapinoe.

The film had its world premiere at the 2026 Toronto International Film Festival on September 10, 2026.

== Premise ==
Explores the life and career of Megan Rapinoe. Sue Bird, Jess Fishlock, Colin Kaepernick, Alex Morgan and Briana Scurry are among those interviewed.

== Production ==
Dan Cogan of Story Syndicate connected Rebeca Huntt with Megan Rapinoe about directing the film, after Rapinoe had seen her previous film Beba.

== Release ==
The film had its world premiere at the 2026 Toronto International Film Festival on September 10. Shortly after, HBO Documentary Films acquired distribution rights to the film.
