= One Night in Idaho: The College Murders =

American documentary series

- Genre: Documentary
- Directed by: Liz Garbus; Matthew Galkin
- Music by: James Lavino
- Country of origin: United States
- Original language: English
- No. of seasons: 1
- No. of episodes: 4

Production
- Executive producers: Liz Garbus; Matthew Galkin; Katie A. King; Dan Cogan; Jon Bardin; Kate Barry; Mala Chapple; David Ellison; Dana Goldberg; Matt Thunell; James Patterson; Bill Robinson; Patrick Santa
- Cinematography: Jeff Hutchens
- Editors: David Mehlman; Brian Chamberlain; Derek Schultz; Dan Duran
- Running time: 42-44 minutes
- Production companies: Amazon MGM Studios; Skydance Television; Story Syndicate; Fairhaven; James Patterson Entertainment

Original release
- Network: Amazon Prime Video
- Release: July 11, 2025 – present

One Night in Idaho: The College Murders is an American documentary series directed and produced by Liz Garbus and Matthew Galkin. As of June 2026, Katie A. King serves as showrunner.

The series premiered on July 11, 2025, on Amazon Prime Video. In June 2026, the series was renewed for a second season, which will premiere on December 28, 2026.

== Premise ==
The series explores the 2022 University of Idaho killings, following families and friends of the victims in the aftermath, with the parents of Ethan Chapin and Madison Mogen giving their first interviews.

== Episodes ==
| No. | Title | Directed by | Original release date |
|---|---|---|---|
| 1 | "Part One" | Liz Garbus | July 11, 2025 |
| 2 | "Part Two" | Matthew Galkin | July 11, 2025 |
| 3 | "Part Three" | Matthew Galkin | July 11, 2025 |
| 4 | "Part Four" | Matthew Galkin | July 11, 2025 |

== Production ==
Matthew Galkin and Liz Garbus began documenting the case after reaching out to the Chapin and Laramie families. They pitched a "victim-forward" style of filmmaking. The Kernodle and Goncalves families declined to participate in the series. Galkin and Garbus additionally wanted to explore the impacts of social media sleuths on the families.

In May 2023, Skydance Television optioned The Idaho Four: An American Tragedy by James Patterson and Vicky Ward, to turn the book into a documentary series, co-producing with Story Syndicate. However, the series was not based on the book, with only research and access being shared. In July 2024, Amazon Prime Video was set to distribute the series, with Liz Garbus and Matthew Galkin set to direct, and the series premiered on July 11, 2025

In June 2026, Amazon Prime Video renewed the series for a second season, which will focus on the police and investigators who were previously under a gag order. The second season will also focus on perpetrator Bryan Kohberger's plea deal.

== Appearing in Documentary Series ==
The documentary series contained many interviews from witnesses, friends, family members of the victims and others involved in the case.

- Karen Laramie, victim Madison Mogen's mother
- Scott Laramie, victim Madison Mogen's stepfather
- Hunter Johnson, a friend of the victims and a key witness in the case, found two of the victims' bodies
- Josie Lauteren, a friend of the victims who was at the house when 911 was called
- Emily Alandt, a friend of the victims who was at the house when 911 was called
- Hunter Chapin, the triplet brother of victim Ethan Chapin
- Maizie Chapin, the triplet sister of victim Ethan Chapin
- Jim Chapin, the father of victim Ethan Chapin
- Stacy Chapin, the mother of victim Ethan Chapin
- Ashlin Couch, a friend of the victims and former roommate
- Ava Wood, a friend of the victims and neighbor
- Lauren Paterson, a journalist for Northwest Public Broadcasting
- Phoebe McGrath, a friend of the victims
- Emma Epperly, a reporter for The Spokesman-Review
- Blaine Eckles, the dean of students for the University of Idaho
- David Berriochoa, a Sigma Chi fraternity brother of Ethan Chapin
- Cortney Franklin, an assistant professor of criminology at the University of Idaho
- DJ Myers, a friend of the victims
- Josh Ferraro, a classmate of Bryan Kohberger when he attended DeSales University
- Brittany Slaven, a classmate of Bryan Kohberger when he attended DeSales University
- Gary Jenkins, the chief of police for the Washington State University Police Department
- Kristine Cameron, an admin of a Facebook group that discusses the murders
- Alina Smith, an admin of a Facebook group that discusses the murders
- Ben DeWitt, a friend of the victim and a news editor for the University of Idaho's newspaper, The Argonaut
- Art Bettge, the mayor of Moscow, Idaho
