= Sally (2025 film) =

2025 American documentary television film

- Promotional release poster
- Directed by: Cristina Costantini
- Produced by: Cristina Costantini; Lauren Cioffi; Dan Cogan; Jon Bardin
- Cinematography: Michael Latham
- Edited by: Kate Hackett; Andy McAllister
- Music by: Jeff Morrow
- Production companies: Story Syndicate; Muck Media; Ark Media
- Distributed by: National Geographic Documentary Films
- Release dates: January 28, 2025 (Sundance); June 16, 2025 (United States)
- Running time: 103 minutes
- Country: United States
- Language: English

Sally is a 2025 American documentary television film, directed and produced by Cristina Costantini.

== Premise ==
It explores the life and career of Sally Ride, and her relationship with Tam O'Shaughnessy.

== Production ==
In February 2024, it was announced Cristina Costantini would direct a documentary revolving around Sally Ride for National Geographic Documentary Films, with Story Syndicate to produce.

== Release ==
It had its world premiere at the Sundance Film Festival on January 28, 2025. It also screened at True/False Film Festival on February 28, 2025, and at South by Southwest on March 7, 2025. It was broadcast on National Geographic on June 16, 2025, and was released on Disney+ and Hulu on June 17.

== Reception ==
On the review aggregator website Rotten Tomatoes, 88% of 32 critics' reviews are positive. The website's consensus reads: "Sally fuses polished documentary technique with sharp humor and pointed social critique to craft a moving, culturally incisive portrait of a trailblazing astronaut." Metacritic, which uses a weighted average, assigned the film a score of 75 out of 100, based on eight critics, indicating "generally favorable" reviews.

Elizabeth Weitzman of TheWrap wrote, "Sally does great justice to an extraordinary astronaut and reluctant icon, someone who broke many barriers and deserves to be celebrated and remembered for who she was in every way. It also, alas, repeats the error made so often by the media of her era, in centering other people's assumptions, and perspectives, over her own."

Caryn James of The Hollywood Reporter wrote, "In the richly detailed Sally, Cristina Costantini reveals both personal and professional aspects of Ride's life, showing how they were intertwined. With O'Shaughnessy as the central narrator, the documentary includes eye-opening interviews with family members and former astronauts and archival video of Ride herself, to create an engaging, socially relevant portrait of an American heroine and of the culture."

== Relevance ==
Director Cristina Costantini later said, following US president Donald Trump's cancelling all diversity, equity and inclusion (DEI) programs intended to help overcome prejudice against people who were LGBTQ, female, and also of darker skin color, that "We made this movie not thinking it was particularly controversial; we had no idea it would be this relevant." Constantini also said, referring to Ride's marriage, "People didn't like women in space, and they especially didn't like single women in space".
