= Gone Girls: The Long Island Serial Killer =

- Genre: Documentary
- Directed by: Liz Garbus
- Music by: Gil Talmi
- Country of origin: United States
- Original language: English
- No. of episodes: 3

Production
- Executive producers: Liz Garbus; Dan Cogan; Jon Bardin; Mala Chapple; Anne Carey
- Producers: Joshua Levine; Grace Fardella
- Cinematography: Thorsten Thielow
- Editors: Mikaela Shwer; Krystalline Armendariz; Brian Chamberlain; Cody Rogowski
- Running time: 49-56 minutes
- Production companies: Story Syndicate; Archer Gray

Original release
- Network: Netflix
- Release: March 31, 2025

Gone Girls: The Long Island Serial Killer is an American documentary series directed and produced by Liz Garbus. It explores the Gilgo Beach serial killings, and the long search for missing women and a suspect. It is told from the perspective of the victims and their loved ones who fought to gain justice for them.

It premiered on March 31, 2025, on Netflix.

== Premise ==
The series follows the Gilgo Beach serial killings, told from the perspective of loved ones and victims.

== Production ==
In August 2023, it was announced Netflix had ordered a documentary series revolving around the Gilgo Beach serial killings, with Liz Garbus set to direct. Garbus previously directed the narrative feature Lost Girls revolving around the case. In January 2025, it was announced to be titled Gone Girls: The Long Island Serial Killer. Kerri Rawson, daughter of BTK serial killer Dennis Rader, also took part in the filming, meeting with Heuermann's wife, daughter, and stepson.

== Viewership ==
According to data from Showlabs, Gone Girls: The Long Island Serial Killer ranked third on Netflix in the United States during the week of 31 March–6 April 2025.
