= I Am an Animal =

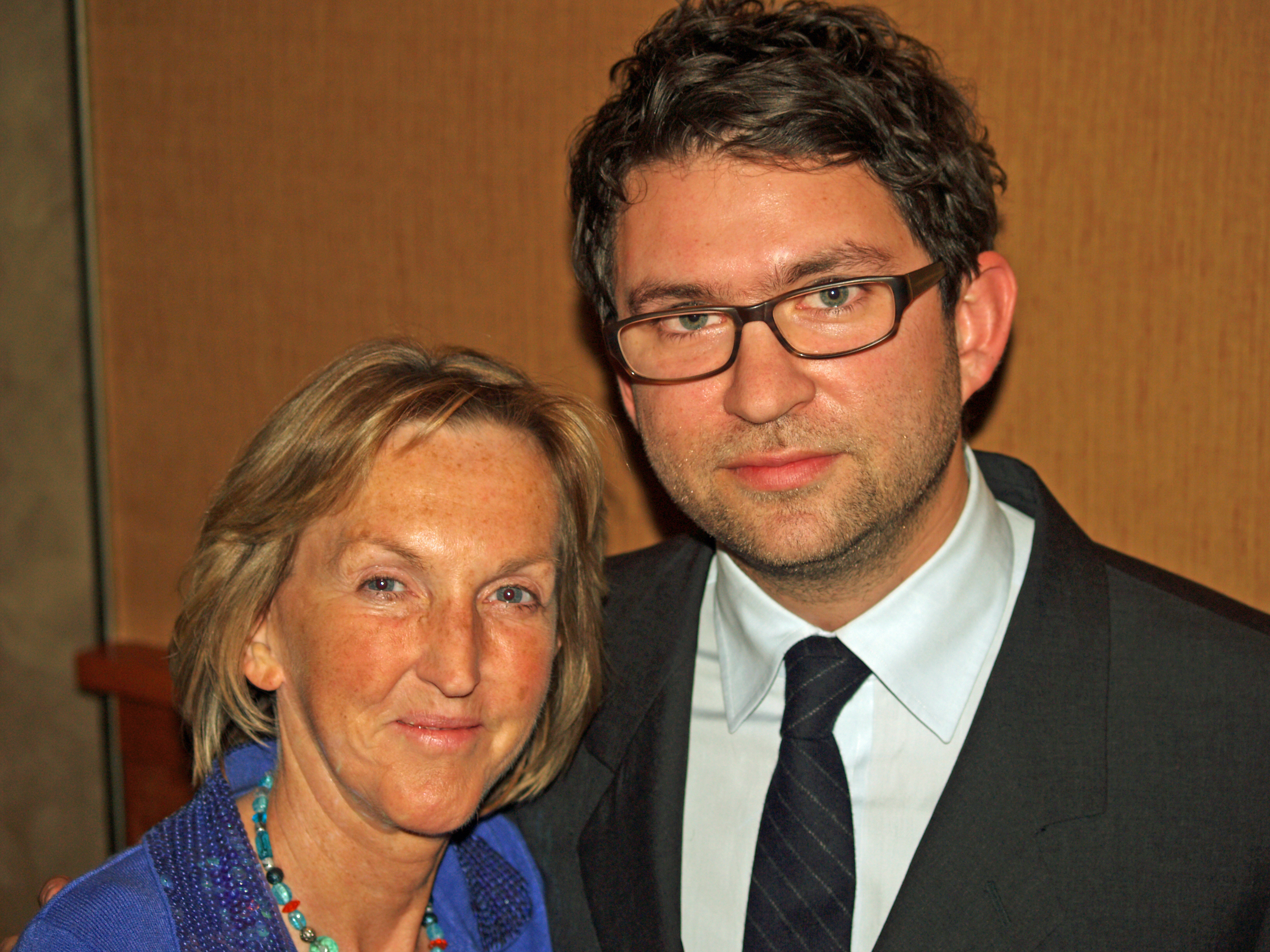
- Ingrid Newkirk with director Matthew Galkin.
- Directed by: Matthew Galkin
- Starring: Ingrid Newkirk
- Music by: James Lavino
- Release date: November 19, 2007
- Running time: 72 minutes
- Country: United States
- Language: English

I Am an Animal: The Story of Ingrid Newkirk and PETA is a 2007 documentary about Ingrid Newkirk, co-founder of People for the Ethical Treatment of Animals (PETA), and her crusade for animal rights. It premiered on November 19, 2007, on HBO. Production credits include Matthew Galkin (director and producer), Sheila Nevins (executive producer), Steven Cantor (producer), and Mikaela Beardsley (producer).

In the film, Newkirk expresses her goal of "total animal liberation," her solidarity with Animal Liberation Front, and states that footage PETA obtains surreptitiously "has the potential to save the world". The film includes a personal perspective on the life of Ingrid Newkirk and her daily routine of balancing her own life and protecting the life of animals. It exposes her willingness to go to the extreme in her fight for animal rights. Due to her commitment and dedication to the fight for ethical treatment of animals, Ingrid Newkirk illustrates why PETA is one of the most successful animal rights organizations. Matthew Galkin was asked in an interview why he chose to film this documentary, and he claimed that it was a classic David and Goliath story of advocating on the behalf of animals. He wanted to raise awareness and encourage animal rights activism.
