= Faye Yager =

American community activist (1948–2024)

Faye Yager (December 19, 1948 – August 3, 2024) was a community activist who founded Children of the Underground, which established safe homes across North America and Europe for abused children. She had been married to Roger Lee Jones, former FBI ten most wanted fugitive #419.

== Background ==
Yager accused Jones of sexually abusing her daughter, which the courts ultimately denied, siding with Jones. Years later, Yager was vindicated when Jones, then her ex-husband, was found to be a sex offender, and her daughter confirmed the abuse. This experience of being ignored by the court led Yager to become an advocate for abused children, whom she felt were also being ignored by the courts. She started an underground network of safehouses to hide women and children from abusers and courts, calling this service "Children of the Underground". To gain attention and support, she was a guest on many popular afternoon talk shows, including Geraldo, The Oprah Winfrey Show, and The Sally Jessy Raphael Show. She was arrested and tried in Georgia for kidnapping and other related charges, for her involvement in hiding children and their mothers. She was acquitted by the jury.

Yager also became involved in the Satanic panic of the 1990s in the United States.

In 2022, the TV network FX created a five-episode TV mini-series about Yager called Children of the Underground. The miniseries highlights her life and complicated story.
