= Dynasty: The Murdochs =

American documentary series

- Genre: Documentary
- Directed by: Liz Garbus; Sara Enright
- Music by: Ariel Marx
- Country of origin: United States
- Original language: English
- No. of episodes: 4

Production
- Executive producers: Liz Garbus; Sara Enright; Dan Cogan; Jon Bardin; Mala Chapple
- Running time: 47-56 minutes
- Production company: Story Syndicate

Original release
- Network: Netflix
- Release: March 13, 2026

Dynasty: The Murdochs is a 2026 American documentary directed and executive produced by Liz Garbus, with Sara Enright co-directing the finale. The series explores the Murdoch family, and the battle for the Succession of Rupert Murdoch.

It premiered on March 13, 2026, on Netflix.

== Premise ==
Explores the Murdoch family, and the battle for the Succession of Rupert Murdoch. David Folkenflik, Matthew Belloni, Jonathan Mahler, Claire Atkinson, Kara Swisher, Walter Marsh, Joyce Purnick, R.G. Belsky, and Paddy Manning are among those interviewed.

== Production ==
Liz Garbus directs and serves as executive producer under her Story Syndicate alongside Sara Enright, who co-directed the series finale.

== Reception ==
=== Critical reception ===
On the review aggregator website Rotten Tomatoes, 100% of 6 critics' reviews are positive.

Patrick Smith of The Independent gave the series four out of five stars, writing: "Just as Succession overflowed with sardonic wit, playing out like a Jacobean tragedy, so too does Dynasty, the series unfurling to its pyrrhic climax." Barbara Ellen of The Observer also praised the series, writing: "It makes for engrossing viewing with texts, document and emails never before seen on television."

Conversely, Stephen Brook of The Age criticized the series lack of access to the Murdochs, but praised the use of archival footage.
