= Titan: The OceanGate Disaster =

2025 American documentary film

- Official poster
- Directed by: Mark Monroe
- Produced by: Mark Monroe; Lily Garrison; Jon Bardin
- Cinematography: Jake Swantko
- Edited by: James Leche
- Music by: Andrew Skeet; Nathan Klein
- Production companies: Story Syndicate; Diamond Docs
- Distributed by: Netflix
- Release dates: June 6, 2025 (Tribeca); June 11, 2025 (United States)
- Running time: 111 minutes
- Country: United States
- Language: English

Titan: The OceanGate Disaster is a 2025 American documentary film, directed and produced by Mark Monroe. It explores the Titan submersible implosion that occurred on June 18, 2023.

It had its world premiere at Tribeca Festival on June 6, 2025, and was released on June 11, 2025, by Netflix.

== Premise ==
The film explores the Titan submersible implosion and events leading up to it, told through whistleblower testimony, audio recordings, and footage of the beginnings of OceanGate.

The film features interviews from former OceanGate employees including David Lochridge, who was OceanGate's former Director of Marine Operations and the primary whistleblower, former intern Emily Hammermeister. Sydney Nargeolet, the daughter of Paul-Henry Nargeolet was interviewed and provided testimony as a victim's family member. Additionally, Mark Harris, an investigative journalist for Wired who reported on the OceanGate disaster was also interviewed for the film.

== Production ==
In January 2025, it was announced Mark Monroe had directed a documentary revolving around the Titan submersible implosion, with Liz Garbus and Dan Cogan set to executive produce under their Story Syndicate banner, alongside Amy Herdy, and Netflix set to distribute.

== Release ==
It had its world premiere at Tribeca Festival on June 6, 2025. It was released on June 11, 2025.

== Reception ==
On the review aggregator website Rotten Tomatoes, 74% of 19 critics' reviews are positive.

Dennis Harvey of Variety wrote, "Gripping to a point if arguably a bit overlong, it has the grim suspense of similar nonfiction catastrophe accounts, like National Geographic's Tham Luang cave flooding film The Rescue without the inspirational angle — or, needless to say, the rescue."

Matt Goldberg of TheWrap wrote that the film "fails to discover the depths of the issues that led to the fateful implosion of the submersible that claimed five lives in Summer 2023, placing sole focus on Stockton Rush's misdeeds."

== Viewership ==
According to data from Showlabs, Titan: The OceanGate Submersible Disaster ranked third on Netflix in the United States during the week of 9–15 June 2025.
