= Joe Gorman =

American judicial officer

Edmund J. "Joe" Gorman Jr. is an American lawyer and judicial officer who serves as the probate commissioner of Nevada's Second Judicial District Court in Washoe County.

He gained national attention in 2024 when he presided over the trust dispute involving the family of media magnate Rupert Murdoch and issued a recommendation blocking Murdoch's bid to consolidate control of his media empire under his son Lachlan Murdoch. Gorman was a candidate for election to a district judgeship in the Second Judicial District Court in Washoe County.

== Early life and education ==
Joe Gorman was born and raised in Boise, Idaho. Gorman received a bachelor's degree from Tulane University in philosophy and French. Gorman spent three years teaching Navajo Nation fourth and fifth graders in New Mexico after getting his undergraduate degree. He then graduated from Stanford Law School in 2009.

== Career ==
=== Legal practice ===
Gorman practiced law in Reno, Nevada as a solo practitioner, focusing on estate planning, probate, and business matters. During his time in private practice, he was named the "Pro Bono Attorney of the Year" in 2015 by Nevada Legal Services. Gorman's path toward judicial service began when the Paiute-Shoshone Tribe asked him to serve as a judge hearing tribal election challenges. He became the Chief Judge for the Tribal Court during his time there.

=== Probate commissioner ===
Gorman was appointed probate commissioner of the Second Judicial District Court, which serves Washoe County, in 2019. As a probate commissioner, he hears probate and trust matters and issues recommendations that are subject to confirmation by a district judge. In the Washoe County Bar Association's 2026 judicial survey which had local lawyers rate judicial officers, Gorman received an average performance score of 4.7 out of 5, the highest reported, tied with three other judicial officers. The New York Times reported that Gorman was seen as "fair, by the book and serious about the rules."

==== Murdoch family trust case ====
In 2024, Gorman presided over a dispute over the Rupert Murdoch family trust, a case that drew international attention. Murdoch had moved to amend his "irrevocable" family trust to give his eldest son, Lachlan Murdoch, permanent control over News Corp and Fox Corporation, rather than sharing control equally among his four eldest children.

In mid-2024, Gorman ruled that Murdoch could amend the trust only if he showed he was acting in good faith and for the sole benefit of his heirs. After closed evidentiary hearings in September 2024, Gorman issued a 96-page opinion on December 9, 2024, ruling against Rupert and Lachlan Murdoch. He characterized the plan to change the trust as a "carefully crafted charade" to "permanently cement Lachlan Murdoch's executive roles," and found that Rupert and Lachlan had acted in "bad faith."

Gorman's handling of the case attracted scrutiny over its secrecy. He had sealed the case in January 2024, keeping the entire file, including the identities of the parties, from public view. In September 2024, after a coalition of news organizations including The New York Times, CNN, the Associated Press, NPR, The Washington Post, and Reuters moved to intervene and unseal the records, Gorman largely denied the request and ruled that the hearings would remain closed to the public and press, following Nevada law which he felt prioritized secrecy.

=== 2026 judicial campaign ===
On January 5, 2026, Gorman filed to run for election to a district judgeship in Department 1 of the Second Judicial District Court, a seat left open by the retirement of Judge Kathleen Drakulich. His opponent is sitting Reno Justice of the Peace Derek Dreiling. The election is nonpartisan. Because only two candidates filed, the scheduled June 2026 primary was canceled, and both advanced directly to the general election.

== Personal life ==
Gorman is a member of the board for the Reno Jazz Orchestra and the Reno Host Lions Club Charity Foundation.
