= Science Fair (film) =

2018 National Geographic documentary film

- Theatrical release poster
- Directed by: Cristina Costantini, Darren Foster
- Written by: Jeffrey Plunkett, Darren Foster, Cristina Costantini
- Produced by: Cristina Costantini, Darren Foster, Jeffrey Plunkett, Isaac Lee (EP), George Lansbury (EP), Keith Summa (EP)
- Edited by: Tom Maroney, Alejandro Valdes-Rochin
- Music by: Jeff Morrow
- Production companies: Univision; Muck Media
- Distributed by: National Geographic Documentary Films
- Release dates: January 20, 2018 (Sundance Film Festival); October 19, 2018
- Running time: 91 minutes
- Country: United States
- Language: English

Science Fair is a 2018 National Geographic documentary film that premiered at the 2018 Sundance Film Festival, winning the first ever Festival Favorite Award.

== Synopsis ==
It covers the lives of 9 teenagers as they prepare for the Intel International Science and Engineering Fair. Characters followed in the film include Serena McCalla, Ph.D. the sole educator in the documentary, coined the "Godmother of Science Research", Kashfia Rahman, a student from South Dakota who did research on the effects of risk-taking behaviors in teenagers, Anjali Chadha, a student from Kentucky who designed a project to test for arsenic, Ivo Zell, a German student who designed a new method of airplane propulsion, and two Brazilian students who innovate a way to treat the Zika virus.

== Reception ==
=== Awards ===
Regarding the Festival Favorite Award, it was described as "so engaging and inspiring that we felt it would delight audiences and be a strong contender for this award" by the director of the Sundance Film Festival, and as "an ode to the teenage science geeks on whom our future depends". The movie also received the Festival Favorite award from the 2018 South by Southwest Film Festival and the Best Documentary Award from the 2018 Portland International Film Festival. It was nominated for an Emmy for Outstanding Science and Technology Documentary at the 40th News and Documentary Emmy Award.
