= Shola Lynch =

American film director (born 1969)

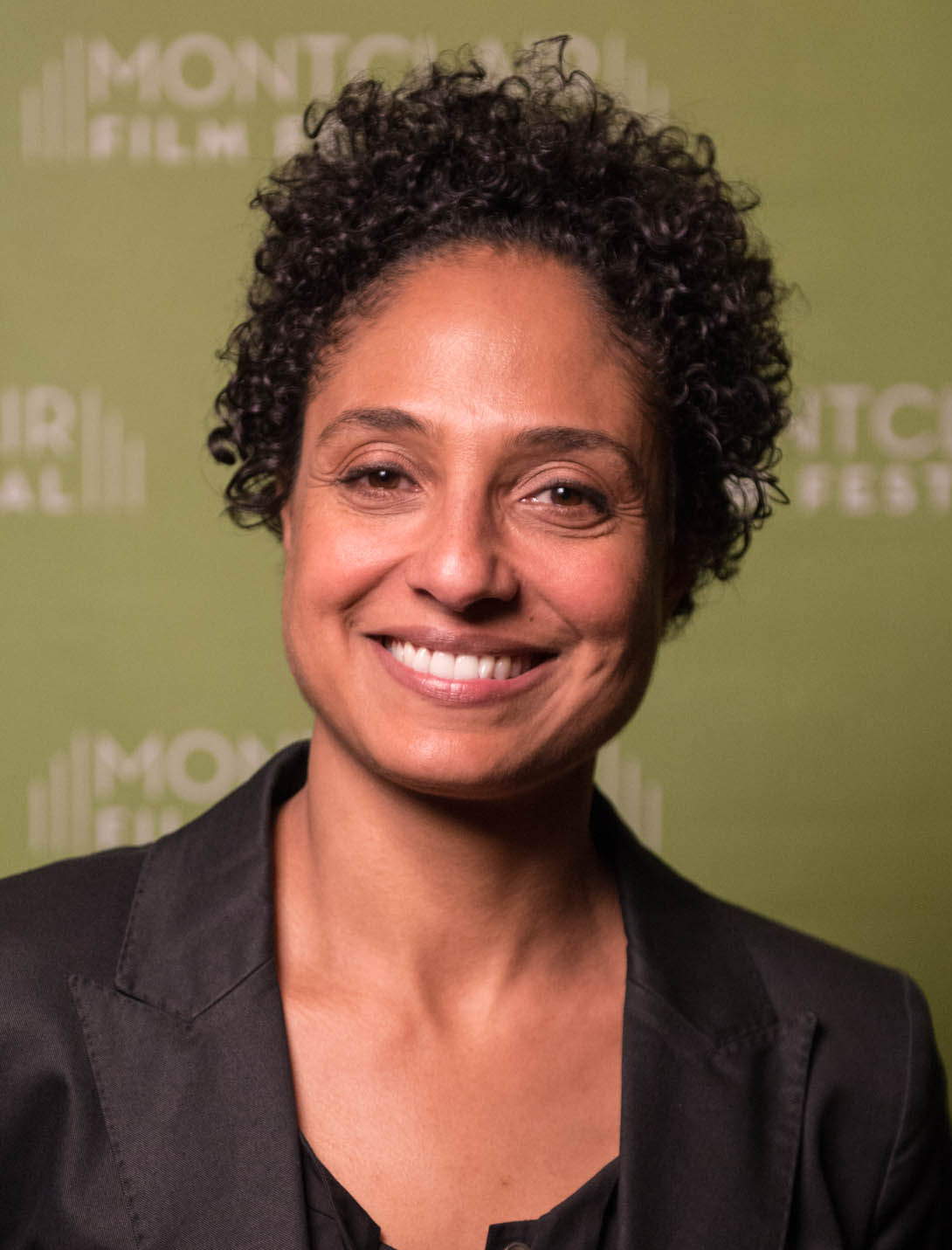
- Lynch in 2013
- Born: Shola Lynch; March 20, 1969 (age 57); Buffalo, New York, United States
- Education: University of Texas at Austin; University of California-Riverside; Columbia University
- Occupations: Director, producer, curator
- Known for: Documentary films
- Notable work: Free Angela and All Political Prisoners; Chisholm '72: Unbought and Unbossed (2004)

Shola Lynch (born March 20, 1969) is an American filmmaker, artist, and former child actress. She is best known for her films Chisholm '72: Unbought and Unbossed (2004) and Free Angela and All Political Prisoners (2012), both of which focus on African American women and political history. She is a member of the Academy of Motion Picture Arts and Sciences.

== Early life and education ==
Lynch was born in Buffalo, New York, and grew up in New York City. She is the oldest daughter of Hollis and Sharon Lynch (née Fisher) and has a younger sister named Nnenna. She is mixed race. Her father is originally from Trinidad and Tobago and her mother is Canadian.

At the age of two, she began acting on the PBS children's series Sesame Street and did so until she was six years old.

She began running and training as a track-and-field athlete in sixth grade specializing in 800-meter and 1500-meter races. By 13, she began breaking national records for her age bracket in 800-, 1500-, and 1600-meter races. She later moved from New York to Texas with the ambition to race in track at the Olympics and she continued to win in events up to 1992. She did not attend the 2000 Olympic Games however, due to a back injury.

Lynch graduated from Hunter College High School and the University of Texas at Austin (UT). She graduated from UT's Plan II honors program and was the captain of its track team two years running. She then attended the University of California-Riverside, where she earned a graduate degree in Public Resource Management and in American history. Her master's thesis was an exhibit at The UCR Museum of Photography called "How Far Have We Come?" examining the different media representations of black people to highlight racial stereotypes throughout history. Lynch also achieved a master's degree in journalism from Columbia University.

== Career ==
After earning her degree, Lynch moved back to New York from Texas to attempt to began an art career. This did not work out due to lack of funds for artists in New York at this time. Instead, she got a job at Ken Burns' production company and worked with him for five years on documentaries including his series Jazz (2000).

Her skills in film and background in history contributed to her research and production for other documentaries, such as HBO Sports' Do You Believe in Miracles? The Story of the 1980 U.S. Olympic Hockey Team (2001). She then worked on Matters of Race: EveryOther (2003), which focused on racialized issues in the United States. Her interest in history and race lead to her to write, direct and produce her first independent film, Chisholm '72: Unbought and Unbossed. Lynch heard about Shirley Chisholm over the radio and this sparked old memories of her from her childhood. Having been inspired by Chisholm as a youth she made multiple attempts to contact her in order to get permission to create a film to inspire a new generation of young people. Chisholm '72: Unbought and Unbossed was Lynch's directorial debut, which premiered at the Sundance Film Festival and won several awards including the George Foster Peabody Award.

Profiling the historical sociopolitical journey of Angela Davis, a UCLA professor and social activist whose controversially-labelled voice helped to fuel the feminist movement of the 1970s, the second film directed by Shola Lynch, Free Angela and All Political Prisoners, debuted during the 21st Pan African Film & Arts Festival, and released to the public on April 5, 2013. With Lynch in the director's chair, the CodeBlack documentary-style film was anchored with Will Smith and Jada Pinkett Smith serving as executive producers on the project. The film received honorable mention at the Tribeca Film Festival and won Best Theatrical Documentary at the 2014 NAACP Image Awards.

Since 2013, Lynch has worked at the New York Public Library Schomburg Center for Research in Black Culture as the Curator of the Moving Image and Recorded Sound Division. Lynch received the Creative Capital grant in 2015 to sponsor the research and production of her next film, tentatively called The Outlaw.

Lynch became a member of the Academy of Motion Picture Arts and Sciences in 2016.

== Personal life ==
Lynch lives in Harlem with her husband and their two children.

== Filmography ==
Year	Title	Director	Producer	Writer
2004	Chisholm '72: Unbought and Unbossed	Yes	Yes	No
2007	Anderson Cooper: 360 Degrees	No	Yes	No
2012	Free Angela and All Political Prisoners	Yes	No	No
2013	Runner: The Mary Decker Story	Yes	No	Yes
2025	Number One on The Call Sheet: Black Leading Women in Hollywood	Yes	No	No

Associate Producer

- Frank Lloyd Wright (1998)
- Jazz (2001)

Director of Research

- Do You Believe in Miracles? The Story of the 1980 U.S. Olympic Hockey Team (2001)

Co-producer

- Matters of Race: EveryOther (2003)
