= Loudquietloud =

Film page

- Directed by: Steven Cantor Matthew Galkin
- Produced by: Steven Cantor; Daniel Laikind
- Cinematography: Paul Dokuchitz; Jonathan Furmanski
- Edited by: Trevor Ristow
- Music by: Marcus Blake; Daniel Lanois; Steve Nistor; Jim Wilson
- Production company: Cactus Three Stick Figure Productions
- Distributed by: Digital Media Rights
- Release date: February 3, 2007
- Country: United States

loudquietloud, stylized as loudQUIETloud, is a 2006 documentary film about the American alternative rock band Pixies directed by Steven Cantor and Matthew Galkin. The film profiles the band during their 2004 reunion.

== Reception ==
In a review, The Guardian wrote that loudQUiETloud "...is a warts-and-all elegy, a fascinating portrait of a gang who hooked up in their youth, achieved a measure of greatness without quite realising what they'd done and then were washed back together again; older and wiser but still with enough piss and vinegar in their systems to still feel aggrieved at the way they somehow let it slide. It goes to prove that the best rock documentaries are not fist-pumping celebrations of triumph but dark sagas of bitter rivalries and missed opportunities."

In a Rolling Stone article, Colin Greenwood, bassist of the band Radiohead, applauded the documentary: “I’ll tell you if anyone wants to understand what it’s like to be in a band, is this Pixie’s documentary that Jonny brought in that we watched. That’s what it’s like, a group of people working in a close proximity for fifteen years together and going through a lot of emotion and stuff and essentially being people and coming out from the experience not to get too damaged from it and I thought that was very very very good. Really tender and accurate and I know some universal truths about it and not just about the Pixies.”
