= Power (2024 film) =

2024 American documentary film

- Directed by: Yance Ford
- Written by: Yance Ford; Ian Olds
- Produced by: Yance Ford; Sweta Vohra; Jess Devaney; Netsanet Negussie
- Cinematography: Julia Liu
- Edited by: Ian Olds
- Music by: Robert Aiki Aubrey Lowe
- Production companies: Multitude Films; Story Syndicate; Corvidae Media
- Distributed by: Netflix
- Release dates: January 18, 2024 (Sundance); May 10, 2024 (United States)
- Running time: 85 minutes
- Country: United States
- Language: English

Power is a 2024 American documentary film, written, directed, and produced by Yance Ford. It explores the scope and scale of the American police over hundreds of years.

It had its world premiere at the 2024 Sundance Film Festival on January 18, 2024, and was released in a limited release on May 10, 2024, prior to streaming on Netflix on May 17, 2024.

== Premise ==
Explores the scope and scale of the American police over hundreds of years. Tracing the money, political power, and bipartisan support that has created modern policing.

== Release ==
It had its world premiere at the 2024 Sundance Film Festival on January 18, 2024. It also screened at CPH:DOX on March 18, 2024. It also screened at Hot Docs Canadian International Documentary Festival on May 1, 2024. It was released in a limited release on May 10, 2024, prior to streaming on Netflix on May 17, 2024.

== Reception ==
On the review aggregator website Rotten Tomatoes, 81% of 31 critics' reviews are positive, with an average rating of 7.1/10. On Metacritic, the film holds a weighted average score of 72 out of 100 based on 13 critics, indicating "generally favorable reviews".
