= Rebeca Huntt =

American filmmaker (born 1990)

- Born: 1990 (age 35–36); New York City, New York, U.S.
- Education: Bard College
- Occupations: Director, producer, screenwriter
- Years active: 2019 – present
- Spouse: films

Rebeca Huntt (born 1990) is an American filmmaker, who has directed the documentary films Beba (2021) and Rapinoe (2026). She has received nominations for the Truer than Fiction Award and Cinema Eye Honors.

== Early life and education ==
Huntt was born in New York City. She attended Bard College in Annandale-on-Hudson, New York, graduating with a Bachelor of Arts degree in cultural anthropology.

== Career ==
In 2019, Huntt directed the documentary short film ¡Hay Coro!, which followed a Dominican DJ duo in the Bronx. In 2020, Huntt wrote and directed the comedy short film 1-800-Lovable, which premiered at the BlackStar Film Festival.

In 2021, Huntt, wrote, directed, and produced the documentary film Beba, which had its world premiere at the 2021 Toronto International Film Festival and was acquired by Neon. It also screened at the 72nd Berlin International Film Festival, and the Tribeca Festival.

In 2026, Huntt directed and produced Rapinoe, a documentary film revolving around the life and career of professional soccer player Megan Rapinoe;the film had its world premiere at the 2026 Toronto International Film Festival.

== See also ==
- List of Bard College people
- List of female film and television directors
- List of people from New York City
- List of screenwriters
