= No Place on Earth =

- Theatrical release poster
- Directed by: Janet Tobias
- Written by: Janet Tobias; Paul Laikin
- Based on: We Fight to Survive by Esther Stermer
- Produced by: Janet Tobias; Susan Barnett; Zita Kisgergely; Paul Laikin; Rafael Marmor; Nadav Schirman
- Starring: Chris Nicola; Saul Stermer; Sam Stermer; Sonia Dodyk
- Cinematography: César Charlone; Eduard Grau; Sean Kirby; Peter Simonite
- Edited by: Deidre Slevin; Claus Wehlisch
- Music by: John Piscitello
- Distributed by: Magnolia Pictures
- Release dates: September 10, 2012 (TIFF); April 5, 2013
- Running time: 83 minutes
- Countries: United Kingdom; Germany; United States
- Languages: English; German; Yiddish
- Box office: $200,238 (North America only)

No Place on Earth is a 2012 documentary film produced, written and directed by Janet Tobias, based on Esther Stermer's memoir We Fight to Survive. It was released theatrically in the United States on April 5, 2013.

== Synopsis ==
In 1993, NYPD officer and caving enthusiast Chris Nicola visited Ukraine to explore the Verteba and Priest's Grotto caves, and found evidence that they had recently been inhabited by humans. After discovering that the caves were used by three Jewish families (Stermer, Dodyk, and Wexler), comprising 38 people, led by matriarch Esther Stermer (1888–1983), escaping the Holocaust, he embarked on a decade-long quest to find survivors. The film features interviews with some of the 36 survivors and/or their descendants, now living mainly in New York City and Montreal. It includes a segment in which Tobias brings some of the survivors, the oldest of whom was a nonagenarian, back to the caves.

== Release ==
The film was shown at the Toronto International Film Festival, the Hamptons International Film Festival, the International Documentary Film Festival Amsterdam, and the Jewish Film Festival Berlin.

=== Accolades ===
Its screenwriters, Janet Tobias and Paul Laikin, were nominated for Best Documentary Screenplay from the Writers Guild of America.

== Cast ==
- Chris Nicola as himself
- Saul Stermer as himself
- Sam Stermer as himself
- Sonia Dodyk as herself
- Sima Dodyk as herself
- Yetta Stermer as herself
- Sol Wexler as himself
- Erin Grunstein Halpern as herself
- Cliff Stermer as himself
- Katalin Lábán as Esther Stermer
- Péter Balázs Kiss as Saul Stermer
- Dániel Hegedüs as Sol Wexler
- Balázs Barna Hídvégi as Nissel Stermer
- Fruzsina Pelikán as Sonia Dodyk
- András Orosz as Sam Stermer
- Mira Bonelli as Sima Dodyk
- Nóra Kovács as Yetta Stermer
- Viktória Szilágyi as Henia Stermer
- Bernadett Sára Borlai as Hannah Stermer
- Péter Zsömbelyi as Zaide Stermer
- Norbert Gogan as Louie Wexler
