= Killing of James Scurlock =

Shooting in Omaha, Nebraska in 2020

- Date: May 30, 2020; 6 years ago
- Time: 11:00 pm
- Location: Omaha, Nebraska, United States; 41.2563574°N 95.9345221°W
- Type: Shooting
- Outcome: Gardner died by suicide
- Deaths: James Scurlock
- Suspects: Jacob Gardner
- Charges: Manslaughter, attempted first-degree assault, making terroristic threats, felony use of weapon
- Location of Omaha, where the incident took place, in Douglas County and in the state of Nebraska.

On May 30, 2020, James Scurlock, a 22-year-old man caught on a camera inside of an Old Market business, moments before he was fatally shot by a 38-year-old bar owner, Jacob "Jake" Gardner. The shooting took place during George Floyd protests in Omaha, Nebraska, in the Old Market area of the city. Scurlock had been among the thousands of protesters who flooded the city's downtown area.

Surveillance video of the strip of bars shows a group of people, including Scurlock, being approached by Jacob Gardner, his father, and one other male in the street. Shortly after, Jacob Gardner's elderly father was shoved by a man to the ground after a verbal confrontation with a woman. Gardner, who was nearby decided to investigate the altercation, then revealed a concealed handgun at his waistband, and while moving away, simultaneously verbally threatened the group, including Scurlock, to stay back. Gardner was then attacked by two members of the crowd after he turned his back on them. As Gardner and one attacker struggled on the ground, Gardner fired shots while being grappled, resulting in the attacker fleeing. Seconds later, Scurlock jumped on Gardner, with one hand holding the arm in which the handgun was being held and one arm draped around Gardner's neck. Gardner asked Scurlock to get off him, and then using his left hand fired the gun over his shoulder, striking Scurlock in the clavicle, killing him.

After 36 hours Gardner was released from police custody after the county attorney concluded that he had acted in self-defense. The decision proved controversial amid accusations of racial motivation. It has been described as exacerbating tensions in the United States, and the case was referred to a grand jury for review; a grand jury returned indictments against Gardner on September 15 on four felony criminal charges, including manslaughter. Special prosecutor Fred Franklin stated that Gardner had been "threatening the use of deadly force in the absence of being threatened with ... deadly force by James Scurlock or anyone who was associated with him."

On September 20, 2020, Gardner was required to turn himself in to police. Instead, he killed himself outside a medical center in Hillsboro, Oregon, where he had moved after the incident. His death is currently under investigation by Hillsboro police and medical examiners. Conspiracy theories saying that Jacob faked his death were disproved when his death certificate was finished in October; his death was ruled a suicide from a self inflicted gunshot wound to the head.

== Incident ==
On May 30, 2020, around 11:00 pm, James Scurlock and a group of protestors were in the Old Market area of Omaha, Nebraska, during the George Floyd protests. During the protest, Scurlock was filmed vandalizing inside a building, including exterior windows and interior office spaces. Scurlock was then headed east toward the corner of 13th and Harney Street near the business belonging to Jacob Gardner, a white bar owner. Gardner and his father stood guard inside his business, The Hive. After a window was broken by protestors, the two men exited The Hive and walked east down the Harney Street sidewalk. Gardner's father pushed two people, telling them to leave. Gardner's father was then knocked to the ground by one man.

A verbal altercation between Gardner and a group of people he believed to be in association with the man who pushed his father ensued. Gardner positioned himself in the midst of the protestors. He lifted his shirt, brandishing a concealed handgun in his waistband. He then withdrew the handgun from his waistband and held it at his side. Gardner was then tackled to the ground by two from behind. Gardner fired two shots in the air (which he would later describe to the police as warning shots), and his two attackers fled. It was then that Scurlock jumped on Gardner's back as he was getting up with the weapon . After both had struggled for around 20 seconds, Gardner fired a third shot over his own shoulder, striking Scurlock in his clavicle. Scurlock was taken to Nebraska Medicine where he died from his injuries.

== Investigation ==
=== Initial ===
By Saturday night, Gardner was held in police custody at the Omaha Police Department headquarters while an investigation was conducted. He was released late Sunday night and was not booked into jail while he was in police custody. Douglas County Attorney Don Kleine reviewed the evidence, including interviews and witnesses. At a press conference on Monday, June 1, Kleine announced that no charges would be filed against Gardner at that time. Kleine described what occurred in the incident, showed copies of video evidence for the audience, narrating what took place, and explained the conclusion that Gardner had acted in self-defense. Prosecutors said Gardner had once held an active Nebraska Concealed Handgun Permit, but that it had expired by the time of the shooting. City ordinance allows "Persons lawfully entitled to possess a firearm while upon the premises where he or she regularly resides or is regularly employed." without holding a concealed weapons permit.

=== Grand jury ===
The Scurlock family's attorney and Nebraska State Senator, Justin Wayne, asked Kleine to send the case to a grand jury. He explained Gardner should face other charges, such as manslaughter, a concealed carry permit violation, or for firing gunshots within the Omaha city limits.

On June 3, 2020, Kleine called a grand jury with a special prosecutor to review the case. He met with Omaha Councilperson Ben Gray and Douglas County Commissioner Chris Rodgers to consider involving the United States Department of Justice. On June 8, Frederick D. Franklin, a federal prosecutor, was appointed to lead the grand jury investigation.

=== Charges and Gardner's death ===
On September 15, 2020, Gardner was indicted by the grand jury on manslaughter, attempted first-degree assault, making terroristic threats and use of a weapon to commit a felony. If convicted, Gardner could have faced a maximum of 95 years imprisonment. His reported deadline date to turn himself in was September 20.

On September 20, 2020, Gardner died by suicide in Hillsboro, Oregon. He was found dead of possible gunshot wounds outside a medical center. Gardner had left Nebraska allegedly due to death threats he was receiving there, and initially stayed in Northern California but relocated to Oregon during the wildfires. He had stayed with an uncle in the Portland area prior to his death.

On July 28, 2021, Gardner's parents sued the Douglas County Attorney's Office, Kleine and Franklin, alleging that comments made by Kleine and Franklin led to Gardner's suicide. On July 30, 2022 the lawsuit was dismissed by Judge John M. Gerrard, who concluded that "There is absolutely no legal basis to conclude that Franklin or anyone else is liable".

== Protests ==
Scurlock's death was reported internationally as exacerbating tensions in the United States. On May 31, there was a Black Lives Matter and George Floyd protest in Kearney, Nebraska, that also included demonstrations in Scurlock's name. Signs included slogans like "Justice for James." It started at the Museum of Nebraska Art and continued to the intersection of Second Avenue and 25th Street.

On June 1, 2020, approximately 300 attended demonstrations in Omaha. Many chanted "What about James?" and 80 were arrested. Nebraska Governor Pete Ricketts apologized to the Black community after saying "where the hell were you people?" during a heated meeting with local Black leaders.

On June 5, 2020, hundreds of demonstrators gathered in memory of Scurlock and to protest racism and racial inequality. They began at Memorial Park and marched across the Dodge Street Pedestrian Bridge to Elmwood Park. Omaha Councilperson Pete Festersen and Scurlock's family attended the protest.

On June 5, 2020, local radio station KFAB posted a video showing Scurlock inside of Old Market businesses vandalizing them just prior to the incident, and interviewed Don Kleine on why his office chose not to release the video.

== Reactions ==
Videos of the incident were posted on social media. Scurlock's father, James Scurlock II, stated that he wanted justice. He said he did not want people to loot or commit acts of violence in Scurlock's name. The family's attorney Justin Wayne said, "In this community, we prosecute black and brown individuals a lot more for things like we just watched," in reference to the video of the incident shown at the press conference. Governor Pete Ricketts stated that "the loss of anybody's life is a tragedy, certainly a personal tragedy for the family and a tragedy for the community." He said he supported Kleine's decision not to press charges. He suggested the public watch the incident for themselves. Ricketts called for peaceful protests.

The Miami Herald reported that Nebraska State Senator Megan Hunt tweeted: "Don Kleine and Douglas County have made a huge mistake. James Scurlock was murdered, and his murderer should be put on trial. With this decision, our justice process never even had a chance to work." On June 1, 2020, the rock band 311 and its vocalist Nick Hexum posted on social media that Scurlock was shot dead by a fan of their group, and that they did not condone the violence shown in the shooting. On June 4, 2020, a spray painted mural of Scurlock was completed in Omaha near 24th and Camden. It was created by a collaboration of over 100 artists. Another mural was created at 16th and Farnam.

The owners of the building in which Gardner's bar was located evicted him shortly after the incident, alleging that Gardner had not complied with the terms of his lease.

== Aftermath ==
In June 2021, the year following Jake Gardner's suicide, attorney John Pierce filed a wrongful death lawsuit on behalf of the Gardner family in Federal Court in Omaha, NE, against special prosecutor Fred Franklin, County Attorney Donald W. Kleine, the Douglas County Attorney’s Office, Douglas County, NE, and 2 retired police detectives. The lawsuit claims Gardner was denied due process, specifically of his Sixth and Fourteenth Amendment rights, largely due to Franklin’s comments who was quoted saying, “Gardner had set up an ambush inside his business, waiting on a looter to come in so he could ‘light him up.’" Pierce followed up saying "these recklessly biased and false statements by Defendant Franklin also caused Jacob Gardner to lose all faith in the justice system and end his own life for fear of an unfair trial. It is time to hold accountable those in power that abuse their power."

The lawsuit was later dismissed.

The events are retold in the book The Lost Sons of Omaha: Two Young Men in an American Tragedy by Joseph Sexton.

== See also ==
- 2020–2021 United States racial unrest
