= Nuclear Family (TV series) =

- Genre: Documentary
- Directed by: Ry Russo-Young
- Country of origin: United States
- Original language: English
- No. of episodes: 3

Production
- Executive producers: Liz Garbus; Jon Bardin; Julie Gaither; Jenny Raskin; Geralyn Dreyfous; Lauren Haber; Peter Saraf; Leah Holzer; Marc Turtletaub; Alex Turtletaub; Maria Zuckerman; Christine Connor; Ryan Heller; Barbara Dobkin; Eric Dobkin; Andrea Van Beuren; Joe Landauer
- Producers: Ry Russo-Young; Dan Cogan; Warren Fischer
- Running time: 57 minutes
- Production companies: HBO Documentary Films; Story Syndicate; Topic Studios; Impact Partners; Big Beach; Sustainable Films; Bunker

Original release
- Network: HBO
- Release: September 26 – October 3, 2021

Nuclear Family is an American documentary miniseries directed and produced by Ry Russo-Young. It follows Russo-Young's mothers as an unexpected lawsuit sends shockwaves throughout their family's lives. It consisted of 3 episodes and premiered on September 26, 2021, on HBO.

== Plot ==
Sandra Russo and Robin Young have two children, Ry and Cade, each through a different sperm donor. Initially the relationship with the donors was pleasant, until one of them sued for paternity and visitation rights.

== Episodes ==
No.	Title	Directed by	Original release date	U.S. viewers (millions)
1	"Episode 1"	Ry Russo-Young	September 26, 2021	0.131
2	"Episode 2"	Ry Russo-Young	October 3, 2021	0.081
3	"Episode 3"	Ry Russo-Young	October 10, 2021	0.062

== Production ==
Ry Russo-Young had wanted to tell her story of her childhood for many years, and initially wanted to make a narrative film about her experience, but instead decided to make a documentary. She initially decided against making a documentary, feeling it would be a "me-and-my problems movie". Russo-Young had been shooting footage of her family over the course of 15–20 years. Russo-Young and her editors went through footage of her childhood and material documenting the case. Because of Tom Steel's death, Russo-Young interviewed his friends and family, and his former legal team to explore his motivations for the lawsuit.

In August 2021, it was announced Russo-Young would direct a documentary series revolving around her family, with Liz Garbus set to executive produce under her Story Syndicate banner, with HBO set to distribute.

== Release ==
It had its world premiere at the 2021 Telluride Film Festival on September 2, 2021.

== Reception ==
On Rotten Tomatoes, the series holds an approval rating of 91% based on 11 reviews. On Metacritic, the series holds a rating of 83 out of 100, based on 6 critics, indicating "universal acclaim".

=== Accolades ===
Year	Award	Category	Recipient(s)	Result	Ref.
2022	GLAAD Media Awards	Outstanding Documentary	Nuclear Family	Nominated	
2021	Peabody Awards	Documentary	Nuclear Family	Nominated	
