= Stolen Youth: Inside the Cult at Sarah Lawrence =

2023 TV miniseries

- Genre: Documentary
- Directed by: Zachary Heinzerling
- Music by: Martin Crane
- Original language: English
- No. of episodes: 3

Production
- Executive producers: Zachary Heinzerling; Liz Garbus; Dan Cogan; Jon Bardin; Krista Parris; Mindy Goldberg
- Producer: Andrew Helms
- Cinematography: Zachary Heinzerling; Ed David; Ashley Connor; Wolfgang Held; Michael Latham; Alejandro Meija; Thorsten Thielow; Paul Yee
- Editors: Zara Serabian-Arthur; Page Marsella
- Production company: Story Syndicate

Original release
- Network: Hulu
- Release: February 9, 2023

Stolen Youth: Inside the Cult at Sarah Lawrence is an American true crime documentary television miniseries, directed by Zachary Heinzerling, revolving around Larry Ray and the cult at Sarah Lawrence College. It premiered on February 9, 2023, on Hulu.

== Premise ==
The docuseries explores Larry Ray and his cult at Sarah Lawrence College. It follows the stories of the victims and some of their family members and friends.

== Episodes ==
No.	Title	Directed by	Original release date
1	"The Arbiter Of Truth"	Zachary Heinzerling	February 9, 2023
2	"Truth Wins"	Zachary Heinzerling	February 9, 2023
3	"Larryland"	Zachary Heinzerling	February 9, 2023

== Cast ==
- Larry Ray – Cult leader who lived on Sarah Lawrence College's campus with his daughter Talia in 2008 without the college's knowledge or permission. According to New York magazine, Larry was diagnosed with histrionic and narcissistic personality disorders. In 2003, he was sentenced to five years probation with securities fraud. In January 2023, he was sentenced to 60 years in prison for racketeering conspiracy, violent crime in aid of racketeering, extortion, sex trafficking, forced labor, tax evasion, and money laundering offenses.
- Talia Ray – Larry's daughter and a student at Sarah Lawrence College.
- Santos – Talia's former boyfriend and Larry's roommate. Victim of Larry.
- Felicia – Santos' oldest sister. Victim of Larry.
- Isabella Pollok – Talia's roommate and best friend. Victim of Larry. She moved in with Larry in 2009 in NYC. She lived with him and Felicia until his arrest a decade later.
- Dan Levin – Moved in with Larry in 2009 and dated Isabella. Victim of Larry. He left the cult in 2013.
- Claudia – A victim of Larry and friend of some of the other victims. She engaged in prostitution and paid a million dollars to Larry. Larry convinced her that she poisoned her roommates and spread rumors about him.
- Yalitza – Santos and Felicia's sister. Victim of Larry.
- Raven – Friend of some of the victims, although Raven was never a part of the cult. She told some of the victims that they were in a cult.

== Production ==
In November 2022, it was announced Zachary Heinzerling had directed a documentary series revolving around Larry Ray, with Story Syndicate producing and Hulu distributing.

== Reception ==
The review aggregator website Rotten Tomatoes reported a 100% approval rating with an average rating of 7.60/10, based on 13 critic reviews. The website's critics consensus reads, "Equal parts baffling and harrowing, Stolen Youth treats its subjects with tasteful finesse while shedding startling insight on cult mentality." Metacritic, which uses a weighted average, assigned a score of 83 out of 100 based on 8 critics, indicating "universal acclaim".
