= Murder in Big Horn =

- Genre: Documentary
- Directed by: Razelle Benally; Matthew Galkin
- Music by: Laura Ortman; James Lavino
- Original language: English
- No. of episodes: 3

Production
- Executive producers: Matthew Galkin; Vinnie Malhotra
- Producers: Razelle Benally; Ivan MacDonald; Ivy MacDonald
- Cinematography: Jeff Hutchens
- Editors: Fanny Lee; David Mehlman
- Running time: 50-54 minutes
- Production companies: Showtime Documentary Films; Fairhaven

Original release
- Network: Showtime
- Release: February 5 – February 19, 2023

Murder in Big Horn is a true crime documentary television miniseries, directed by Razelle Benally and Matthew Galkin. It follows missing and murdered Indigenous women in Montana. It premiered on February 5, 2023, on Showtime.

== Synopsis ==
The series follows missing and murdered Indigenous women in rural Montana, with families and journalists sharing their stories.

== Episodes ==
No.	Title	Directed by	Original release date
1	"101"	Razelle Benally	February 5, 2023
2	"102"	Matthew Galkin	February 12, 2023
3	"103"	Razelle Benally	February 19, 2023

== Production ==
Showtime approached Matthew Galkin about directing a documentary revolving around Missing and murdered Indigenous women, Galkin then approached Razelle Benally about co-directing the project. Benally knew families affected by the violence and worked with the movement, and approached people who had already been vocal of their advocacy of their families stories. Benally and Galkin wanted to humanize the victims and tell their stories.

== Release ==
The series had its world premiere at the 2023 Sundance Film Festival on January 22, 2023. It premiered on February 5, 2023, on Showtime.

== Reception ==
On review aggregator Rotten Tomatoes, Murder in Big Horn has an approval rating of 86% based on 14 reviews, with an average rating of 7.50/10. Metacritic calculated an average of 68 out of 100 based on 10 reviews, indicating "generally favorable reviews". The film won a 2024 News & Doc Emmy for Outstanding Cinematography for DP Jeff Hutchens. The series was nominated for a 2024 Independent Spirit Award for Best New Non-scripted or Documentary Series.
