= Take Care of Maya =

2023 film by Henry Roosevelt

- Directed by: Henry Roosevelt
- Produced by: Caitlin Keating
- Cinematography: Patrick Ginnetty
- Edited by: Anna Auster; Jawad Metni; Henry Roosevelt; Pax Wassermann
- Music by: James Daly; Dan Krysa
- Production companies: Story Syndicate; Wise Fool
- Distributed by: Netflix
- Release dates: June 10, 2023 (Tribeca); June 19, 2023 (Worldwide)
- Running time: 103 minutes
- Country: United States
- Language: English

Take Care of Maya is a 2023 American documentary film directed by Henry Roosevelt. It premiered at the Tribeca Film Festival on June 10, 2023, and was released on Netflix on June 19, 2023. It was nominated for two News and Documentary Emmy Awards in 2024: Outstanding Direction and Outstanding Research.

== Synopsis ==
In early 2015, Jack and Beata Kowalski's 9-year-old daughter Maya begins experiencing breathing problems, skin lesions, lower limb dystonia, and debilitating chronic pain. After countless doctors appointments with no firm diagnosis, Dr. Anthony Kirkpatrick diagnoses Maya with advanced complex regional pain syndrome (CRPS), a disease that can be treated with ketamine. After low doses of ketamine prove ineffective, Kirkpatrick recommends a ketamine coma, whereby Maya would be given a large amount of ketamine to induce a five-day coma. It proves successful; Maya's pain and symptoms are significantly reduced. Maya is prescribed 1,000 mg of ketamine daily, which reduces her symptoms for a year.

On October 7, 2016, Maya relapses and Jack takes her to the ER at Johns Hopkins All Children's Hospital (JHACH). The hospital staff are unfamiliar with CRPS and are concerned at the amount of ketamine that Maya has been receiving. When Beata arrives, the ER physicians comment that she is "belligerent," "demanding," and "controlling" regarding Maya's treatments, leading them to question the validity of Maya's diagnosis. On suspicion that Maya is a victim of Munchausen syndrome by proxy, the hospital staff contacts child protective services. Dr. Sally Smith, a child abuse pediatrician, interviews Maya and Jack and comes to the conclusion that Beata is abusing Maya. A nurse informs Jack that Maya is now under state custody and orders him to leave.

The Kowalskis hire lawyer Debra Salisbury, who tells them that cases like theirs are common. Dr. Smith works for the Suncoast Center, which provides privatized child welfare services to Pinellas County, where JHACH is located. Salisbury finds out that children in Pinellas County are almost two and a half times as likely to be removed from their families when compared to the Florida average. The hospital doctors ignore Dr. Kirkpatrick's treatment plans, which angers Beata, but Jack urges her not to create more tension with the hospital. A judge issues a no-contact order between Beata and Maya, though Jack is allowed to visit Maya under strict conditions. Without the ketamine treatments, Kirkpatrick informs the Kowalskis that Maya's prolonged severe pain could cause her death.

Beata is finally able to call Maya under the strict supervision of Cathi Bedy, a Suncoast social worker. Jack researches Bedy on the Internet and finds out that she had previously been arrested for child abuse. After Maya cries for her mother and tells Beata that she wants to go home, Bedy tries to get Beata's calling privileges revoked. Beata, under pending investigation by the Sarasota County Sheriff's Office, undergoes several court hearings that repeatedly result in the judge siding with the hospital and Dr. Smith. During one hearing, Beata requests one hug with her daughter, but this is rejected. Believing she is the impediment to Maya's freedom, Beata dies by suicide after 87 days without her daughter.

Sarasota Herald-Tribune reporter Daphne Chen is investigating child welfare in Florida when she comes across the Kowalskis' case. Her January 2019 article opens the floodgates to multiple parents who went through similar situations at Johns Hopkins, all originating from reports made by Dr. Smith.

=== Aftermath ===
It was learned through discovery that Johns Hopkins charged the Kowalskis' medical insurance for 174 different CRPS services and treatments, all while maintaining that Maya was lying about her condition.

The Kowalski lawsuit went to trial in the Twelfth Judicial Circuit Court of Florida in late September 2023. Jack Kowalski—on behalf of himself, Maya, Kyle, and the estate of Beata—sued Johns Hopkins All Children's Hospital for $220 million: $55 million in compensatory damages and $165 million in punitive damages. On November 9, 2023, after two days of deliberations, a six-person jury found in favor of the Kowalski family, awarding $261 million in total compensatory and punitive damages. The judge subsequently granted a defense motion for remittitur, reducing the award by $47.5 million. The award was overturned on appeal on October 29, 2025, on a number of grounds including that the court erred in not giving more legal protection to the hospital in its role as a state-mandated reporter of suspected child abuse. It has been remanded for retrial.

== Release and reception ==
Take Care of Maya premiered at the Tribeca Film Festival on June 10, 2023. It was released on Netflix nine days later, on June 19.

=== Critical response ===
On the review aggregator website Rotten Tomatoes, 92% of 13 critics' reviews are positive, with an average rating of 7.0/10. Metacritic, which uses a weighted average, assigned the film a score of 64 out of 100, based on 5 critics, indicating "generally favorable" reviews.

Chris Vognar of Rolling Stone called the film "a strange, brutally sad story," but wrote that "Take Care of Maya at times leaves the viewer wanting just a little bit more... What is the system’s ultimate motive here? Is it financial? If so, how? There is a sense of mystery at the heart of Take Care of Maya that sticks in the craw a little." Natalia Winkelman of The New York Times found that the film favored sensationalism over thorough analysis, particularly in failing to expand on the relationship between Florida's privatized child welfare companies and the hospitals they serve.
