= Story Syndicate =

US media production company

- Industry: Film industry
- Founded: June 2019; 7 years ago
- Founder: Liz Garbus; Dan Cogan
- Headquarters: Brooklyn, New York City
- Website: storysyndicate.com

Story Syndicate is an American film production and television production company founded in 2019 by Liz Garbus and Dan Cogan. The company primarily features documentary films and television series.

They have produced such films as All In: The Fight for Democracy (2020), Fauci (2021), Becoming Cousteau (2021), Take Care of Maya (2023), and Titan: The OceanGate Disaster (2025). They have also produced the television series The Innocence Files (2020), I'll Be Gone in the Dark (2020–21), Nuclear Family (2021), Harry & Meghan (2022), Last Call: When a Serial Killer Stalked Queer New York (2023), and Gone Girls: The Long Island Serial Killer (2025).

== History ==
In June 2019, it was announced Liz Garbus and Dan Cogan would launch Story Syndicate, a production company, producing documentary and narrative film and television series.

The company has produced such films as All In: The Fight for Democracy (2020) directed by Garbus and Lisa Cortés, Fauci (2021), directed by John Hoffman and Janet Tobias, Becoming Cousteau (2021), directed by Garbus, Britney vs. Spears (2021), directed by Erin Lee Carr, and Mayor Pete directed by Jesse Moss.

The company has also produced multiple documentary series including Harry & Meghan (2022), Stolen Youth: Inside the Cult at Sarah Lawrence (2023), Last Call: When a Serial Killer Stalked Queer New York (2023), Gone Girls: The Long Island Serial Killer (2025), One Night in Idaho: The College Murders (2025), and Dynasty: The Murdochs (2026).

In October 2023, Story Syndicate launched a scripted film and television division, signing a first-look deal with Tomorrow Studios.

In November 2025, Story Syndicate launched a equity fund to finance documentary film and television projects.

== Filmography ==
=== Films ===
Title	Year	Distributor
2020	All In: The Fight for Democracy	Amazon MGM Studios
2020	Ariana Grande: Excuse Me, I Love You	Netflix
2021	Fauci	National Geographic Documentary Films
2021	Becoming Cousteau	National Geographic Documentary Films
2021	Britney vs Spears	Netflix
2021	Convergence: Courage in a Crisis	Netflix
2021	Mayor Pete	Amazon MGM Studios
2022	To the End	Roadside Attractions
2022	The Conspiracy	
2022	I Am Vanessa Guillen	Netflix
2023	Justice	
2023	Take Care of Maya	Netflix
2023	The Barber of Little Rock	The New Yorker
2023	The Ringleader: The Case of the Bling Ring	HBO Documentary Films
2024	Power	Netflix
2024	Love to the Max	The New Yorker
2025	Engima	HBO Documentary Films
2025	Last Take: Rust and the Story of Halyna	Hulu
2025	Her/Mine	
2025	Titan: The OceanGate Disaster	Netflix
2026	Give Me the Ball!	ESPN Films
2026	Maternal Instinct	Netflix
2026	Love, Rendered	Google
2026	Rapinoe	HBO Documentary Films

=== Television ===
Title	Year	Network
2020-2021	I'll Be Gone in the Dark	HBO
2021	Nuclear Family	HBO
2022	Children of the Underground	FX
2022	The Murders Before the Marathon	Hulu
2022	Eat the Rich: The GameStop Saga	Netflix
2022	Harry & Meghan	Netflix
2023	Stolen Youth: Inside the Cult at Sarah Lawrence	Hulu
2023	Unknown	Netflix
2023	Last Call: When a Serial Killer Stalked Queer New York	HBO
2024	Family Secrets: The Disappearance of Alissa Turney	Oxygen
2025	Number One on the Call Sheet	Apple TV
2025	Gone Girls: The Long Island Serial Killer	Netflix
2025	One Night in Idaho: The College Murders	Amazon Prime Video
2026	Dynasty: The Murdochs	Netflix
2026	A Killer Story	HBO
2026	Taken: Natalee Holloway	Netflix

== Controversy ==
In August 2023, it was announced employees of Story Syndicate had secured voluntary union recognition, to be represented by the Writers Guild of America East and Motion Pictures Editors Guild. The deal with Writers Guild of America East was finalized in June 2025. In November 2024, following eight months of bargaining, a petition by the unions stressed the company to finalize a fair deal for employees, with signatures from Lilly Wachowski, John Walsh, Tom Fontana, and Josh Gondelman.

In June 2025, Motion Pictures Editors Guild held a protest at the premiere of Titan: The OceanGate Disaster at Tribeca Festival, distributing fliers bringing attention to alleged anti-union conduct by Story Syndicate. Motion Pictures Editors Guild previously in March 2025, brought charges against Story Syndicate to the National Labor Relations Board, accusing the company of refusing to bargain and bad faith bargaining.
