= Nnenna Lynch =

American distance runner

Personal information
- Born: July 3, 1971 (age 55) New York City, New York, U.S.
- Occupations: Affordable housing developer, board member, speaker
- Spouse: Jonathon Kahn
- Children: 2
- Website: www.xylem.nyc

Sport
- Country: United States
- Sport: Track and field; Cross country running
- Event: Middle Distance Running (800m-10,000m)
- University team: Villanova University; Oxford University
- Team: USA
Medal record
Representing United States
Summer Universiade
| Gold medal – first place | 1997 Catania | 5000m |

Nnenna Lynch (July 3, 1971; New York City) is an American real estate and economic development executive, and former professional athlete. She is the founder and CEO of Xylem Projects, a NYC-based real estate development firm specializing in affordable housing. She is Co-President of the Association of American Rhodes Scholars (AARS) and Chair of the Board of New York Road Runners (NYRR), a not-for-profit, and organizer of the world's largest marathon.

Nnenna serves as an independent director of AvalonBay Communities, Inc. (AVB), Blackstone Mortgage Trust, Inc. (BXMT).

== Early life ==
Lynch is a born-and-raised New Yorker who grew up in Columbia University housing on Riverside Drive. Her parents separated when she was young, and she was raised by her mother, Sharon Lynch, a native of Canada. Lynch's father, Hollis Lynch, a native of Trinidad and Tobago, is a historian.

== Education ==
Lynch and her older sister, Shola, attended Hunter College Elementary School. Lynch started in pre-K and went on to graduate from Hunter College High School in 1989. She won a full scholarship to Villanova University and graduated summa cum laude in 1992 with a BA in sociology. In 1992, she became Villanova's first Rhodes Scholar and in 1993 she was named the NCAA Woman of the Year. In 1997, she went on to earn a master's degree in social anthropology at the University of Oxford.

At Oxford, Lynch's thesis subject was the New Age Travellers, a group of disenfranchised youth living a somewhat nomadic lifestyle. As she told the New York Times, They are an itinerant group of mainly young Britons who live in buses and vans and squatted buildings … I tried to understand their world view. I have an interest in community development and helping others. That's what a meaningful life is all about. Later, Villanova University created the Nnenna Lynch Award, which is presented to the sports team with the highest GPA.

== Career ==
=== Running Career ===
Lynch followed her older sister, Shola Lynch, into competitive running. They trained under the guidance of Barry Geisler, who served as NYRR president from 1971 to 1972. During this time, the sisters became track stars and darlings of the local sports press, known as the "Lynch sisters." Lynch won her first national championship in 1983 at the AAU/USA Junior Olympic Cross Country Championships in Fresno, California.

Lynch received a full athletic scholarship to Villanova University at a time when it was the dominant women's middle-distance program. While there, her team won an unprecedented four consecutive NCAA Cross Country titles.

Her collegiate teammates included Vicki Huber and Sonia O'Sullivan. In 1992, she became an NCAA Champion in the 3000m. Lynch turned professional while living in England and studying at the University of Oxford. Notable performances include winning England's National Cross Country Championship in 1996 and becoming the 5000m World University Games Champion in 1997. She was a member of the US national team five times and won the US Cross Country team trials in 1997 and 1998. During this time, her primary sponsor was FILA.

Lynch's two op-eds about running, "Advice From a Former Olympic Hopeful: Set the Bar Low" (2016), and "Thank Goodness for the New York City Marathon" (2024), appeared in the New York Times.

After retiring from competitive running, Lynch ran the New York City Marathon in 2:55, placing her on the African-American All-Time Rankings List. From 2004 to 2008, she participated in local sprint and Olympic-distance triathlons. In 2025, she completed both the Tokyo and Boston marathons.

Running Career Highlights
| Year | Event | Ref. |
| 2018 | NCAA Silver Anniversary Award | |
| 2010 | Villanova University Hall of Fame inductee | |
| 1998 | #26 World ranking, 3000m | |
| 1998 | #1 US ranking & #7 World ranking, 10 miles | |
| 1997 | Summer Universiade Gold Medalist, 5000m | |
| 1996 | England National Cross Country Champion | |
| 1996-1998 | 5x US Team Member | |
| 1995 | #2 World ranking, 5 miles | |
| 1993 | NCAA Top Six Award | |
| 1993 | NCAA Woman of the Year | |
| 1989-1992 | Big East Conference Championships; 7 relay, 4 team & 3 individual | |
| 1989-1992 | 4 NCAA Cross Country Team titles | |
| 1991-1992 | 7x All American (1 relay & 6 individual) | |
| 1992 | NCAA Outdoor Track Champion, 3000m | |

=== Post-athletic career ===
Lynch began her post-athletic career as an analyst at Goldman Sachs. In 2008, Nnenna accepted the position of Senior Advisor on Economic Development in the Mayor's Office. She worked with Mayor Michael Bloomberg, Deputy Mayor Robert Steel, and Deputy Mayor Bob Lieber to help develop and implement economic development policies and projects, including the redevelopment of the Atlantic Yards, which has resulted in the creation of thousands of new jobs with the opening of the Barclays Center, as well as the construction of commercial space and new housing.

After serving in government, Lynch became Head of Development at The Georgetown Company, and in 2018, she launched Xylem Projects. In the same year, she was awarded the NCAA Silver Anniversary Award. In 2022, she was featured in Women's Running when it was announced that she would be the incoming Chair of NYRR.

Nnenna serves on the Gilder Lehrman Institute's President's Council. Her prior service on other boards includes Villanova University, the Van Alen Institute and New York City Housing Authority (NYCHA). In 2021, she was the Edward P. Bass Distinguished Visiting Professor at Yale University's School of Architecture.

=== Modeling career ===
Lynch occasionally worked as a model in the 1980s and 1990s, appearing in Glamour, Vogue and Maxim. But, it was in the sports pages that Annie Liebovitz spotted her and suggested the Lynch sisters for the Gap's Individuals of Style campaign. Liebovitz's photo appeared on bus stops across New York in 1989. In 1994, Lynch was named one of People Magazine's 50 Most Beautiful People. She also appeared on the covers of Runner's World US (October 1997), Runner's World UK (November 1997) and Sports Illustrated for Women (November 2002).

== Personal life ==
Lynch's father earned his doctorate at the University of London's School of Oriental and African Studies in 1964. In 1969, he accepted a position as professor of African and Pan-African history at Columbia University in New York. He was the first Black historian to hold a tenured position at Columbia and among the first Black professors in the United States to be granted full professorship. In 2005, he became professor emeritus of history at Columbia University. He is also the owner of Richmond Great House in Tobago, the only former plantation house remaining on the island. Lynch's mother retired as a social worker for the Office of Family Services in Manhattan.

In 2000, Lynch met skier Erik Schlopy in the cafeteria at the United States Olympic Training Center in 2000. They married in 2002 and later separated.

In 2006, Lynch married Jonathon S. Kahn, Professor of Religion at Vassar College. They live in Harlem with their two children.
