= Succession of Rupert Murdoch =

Estate dispute

In the Matter of the Doe 1 Trust
- Court: Nevada Second Judicial District Court
- Decided: December 9, 2024
- Citation: PR23-00813

Court membership
- Judge sitting: Edmund Gorman Jr. (probate commissioner)

The succession of Rupert Murdoch describes a court case relating to which of Australian-American media magnate Rupert Murdoch's children will gain power and influence over his business interests, in particular News Corp and Fox Corporation. Since Murdoch's retirement and as of September 2024, these have been headed by his eldest son Lachlan Murdoch. The case is known as In the Matter of the Doe 1 Trust.

The issue of succession began in December 2023, when Rupert Murdoch applied to change the terms of his "irrevocable" family trust (established in 1999, as the Murdoch Family Trust, or MFT) to ensure that Lachlan would have full control over News Corp, a mass media and publishing company that manages hundreds of assets, instead of his sharing voting rights equally with his three siblings Prudence MacLeod, Elisabeth Murdoch and James Murdoch. The court case was held at the Washoe County Courthouse in Reno, Nevada, U.S., in September 2024.

On December 9, 2024, probate commissioner Edmund Gorman Jr. ruled against Rupert and Lachlan Murdoch.

== Background ==
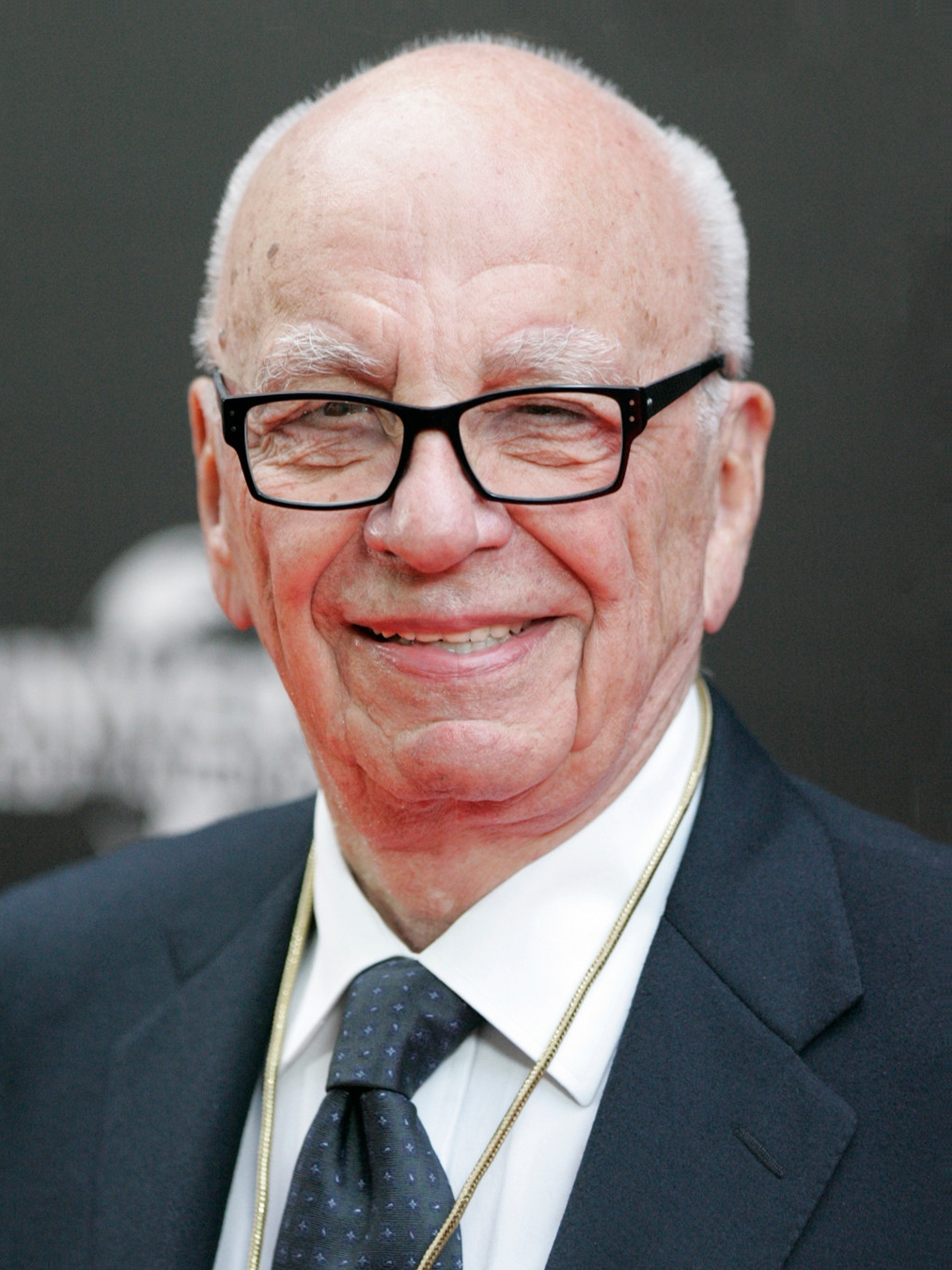
Rupert Murdoch

=== News Corp ===
In 1952, Rupert Murdoch inherited The News, a tabloid newspaper based in Adelaide, South Australia, after the death of his father Keith. In the years following, he acquired several newspapers in the United Kingdom and the United States, including News of the World, The Sun, the New York Post, and founded Sky News and Fox News. News Corporation, Murdoch's company, later acquired HarperCollins and Dow Jones & Company, the publisher of The Wall Street Journal. In 2013, amid several scandals—including the News International phone hacking scandal, News Corporation divested its entertainment assets into 21st Century Fox and its publishing assets into News Corp. The Walt Disney Company acquired 21st Century Fox in March 2019. Murdoch's eldest son Lachlan was appointed the chief executive of Fox Corporation following the acquisition and appointed the chairman of Fox Corporation and News Corp in September 2023. Murdoch's assets are primarily derived from Fox Corporation, which retained nearly thirty affiliate television stations after Disney's acquisition and operates several Fox News affiliates.

=== Murdoch family ===
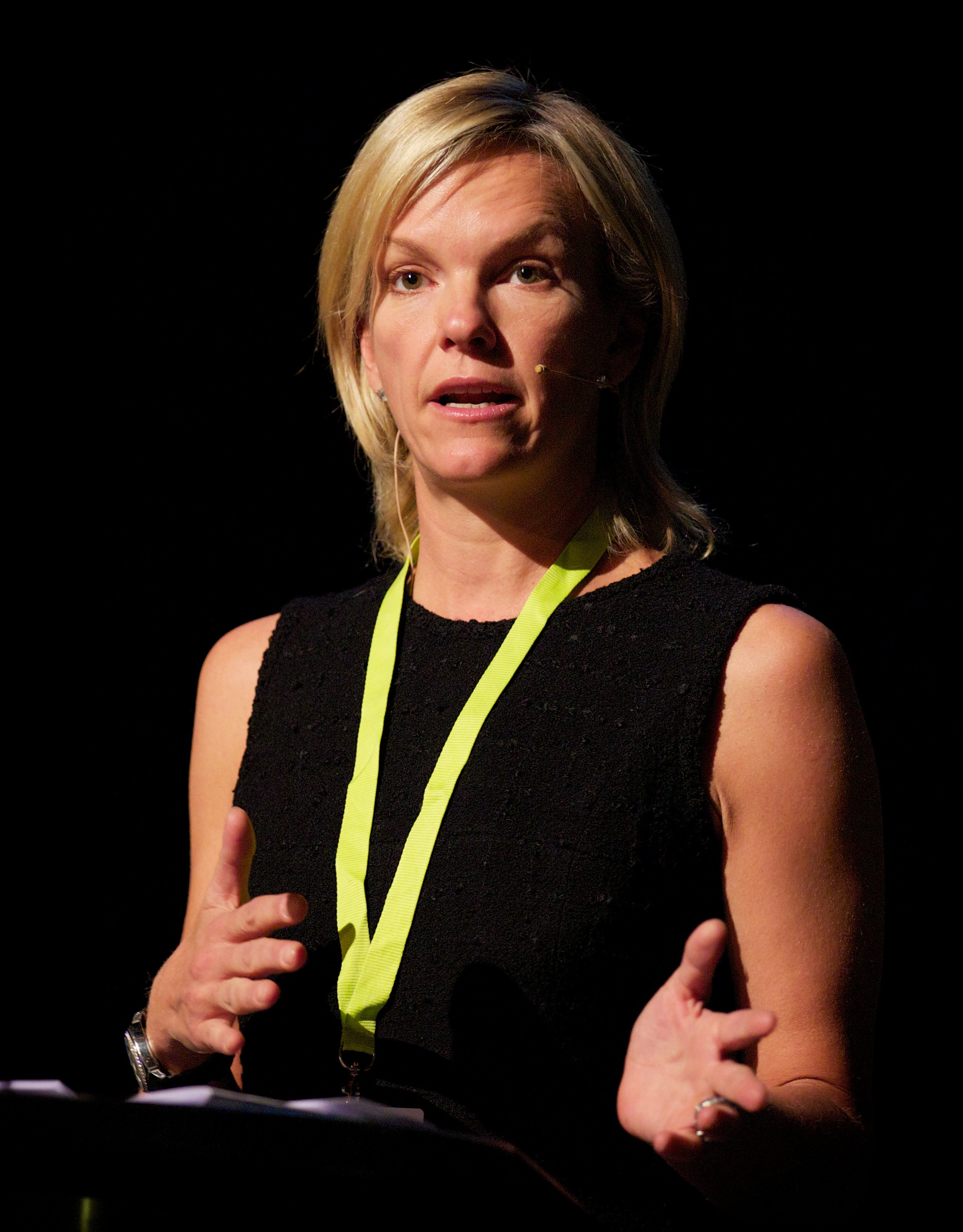
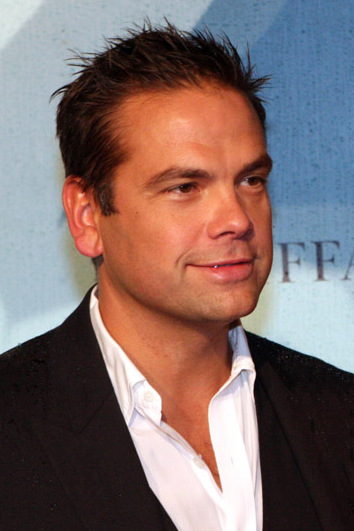
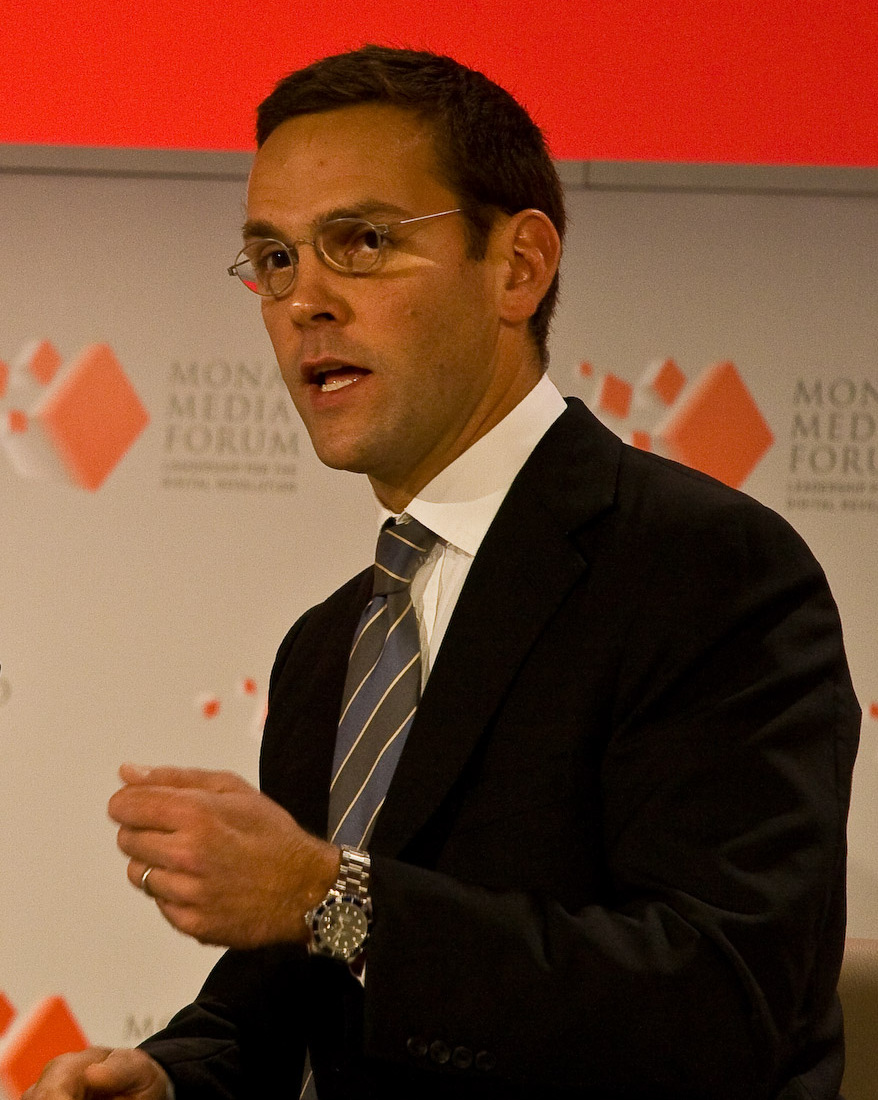
Elisabeth, Lachlan, and James Murdoch

Rupert Murdoch has six children, including one with Patricia Booker and three with Anna Maria Torv (now Anna dePeyster). Prudence, who is the only child from Murdoch's first marriage, was described by Michael Wolff in Vanity Fair as uninterested in Murdoch's business operations, though she was employed as a journalist at News of the World. Elisabeth, Murdoch's eldest child with Torv, was the chairwoman of television production firm Shine Group until it was acquired by 21st Century Fox in 2015. Lachlan, Murdoch's elder son, is the chairman of Fox Corporation and News Corp and the chief executive of Fox Corporation. James was a board member of News Corp until he resigned in 2020 over "disagreements over certain editorial content," including coverage by the company's assets of the 2019–20 Australian bushfire season. James's political views concerned his father, who believed he would enlist Elisabeth and Prudence to ensure editorial neutrality. According to The Wall Street Journal, Murdoch postulated that James could sell Fox News, and former host Tucker Carlson expressed concerns. In October 2022, Murdoch proposed combining News Corp and Fox Corporation, a merger that would have solidified Lachlan's position. Murdoch's efforts were privately criticized by Elisabeth and Prudence; at a dinner for Elisabeth's husband Keith Tyson, Robert De Niro encouraged her to go against her father, though she later appeared with Rupert at Super Bowl LVII.

The Murdoch Family Trust (MFT), written after Murdoch's divorce from Torv in 1999, defers management of News Corp to Murdoch's children upon his death and is largely irrevocable, but contains a provision that allows good faith and beneficial changes. The trust gives Chloe and Grace, Murdoch's two youngest children with Wendi Deng Murdoch, equal share of the equity without voting rights. The Murdoch trust controls the largest share—but not a majority—of voting rights in News Corp despite low equity. The MFT owns only 14 per cent of News Corp in economic terms, but the family is able to have control over it because it owns 41 per cent of the voting shares. This is because News Corp shares have two tiers: voting shares and non-voting shares. The trust is governed by a single trustee, Cruden Financial Services, which is controlled by a board composed of six managing directors; four appointed by each of the older children, allotted one vote each, and two appointed by Rupert, with two votes each.

In mid-2023, Lachlan Murdoch initiated a plan to change the trust, which he named "Project Family Harmony", labelling his brother James as the "troublesome beneficiary." In December 2023, Rupert Murdoch applied to alter the terms of the irrevocable trust in an effort to appoint Lachlan as the sole proprietor, arguing that the conservative bias of News Corp's media assets could be retained, ensuring its commercial value. He met with Elisabeth and Prudence after filing his petition, who disapproved of his efforts. Rupert moved the trust to Nevada, a decision that would favor Lachlan for the state's probate law. Nevada has strict confidentiality protections, and few income and inheritance taxes, so it is a popular state for the management of family trusts. Representatives for Murdoch's children attempted to adjourn a meeting in Reno approving the changes, but failed. Rupert's argument was that interference by the other siblings would cause a financial loss to Fox, and therefore it would be "in their own best interests if they have their votes taken away from them".

According to the Wall Street Journal in September 2024, James had made a prior attempt at settlement, in a proposal that included the possible sale of his and his sisters' interests in the trust. However, this would lead to a loosening of Rupert and Lachlan's hold on the companies, as they would be under financial strain. Paddy Manning, who published an unauthorised biography of Lachlan Murdoch in 2022, claims that Lachlan had the option to buy out his family members a few years ago, but, after papers had been drawn up, he decided that the price was too high, and none of the siblings appeared to pose a threat to his control of the business. To buy out his three siblings now would cost at least $US3 billion (A$4.4 billion), and as his wealth was estimated at $US2.4 billion (A$3.5 billion) in early 2024, it is unclear whether he could fund the purchase.

An annual meeting of News Corp shareholders was held by webcast on 20 November, to determine whether the "dual-class" share structure (voting and non-voting) should be abolished, after Starboard Value, which has bought up a large share of News Corp over the previous year, proposed a one-share-one-vote system. News Corp stated that if the proposal is accepted, the new system of shares could only be introduced if agreement between voting and non-voting shareholders is reached. After the meeting on 20 November, the Murdoch Family Trust and other investors voted to reject Starboard's proposal, retaining the dual-class voting structure.

=== Murdoch's health ===
According to Vanity Fair in April 2023, Murdoch had previously suffered several medical emergencies that were largely unreported, including "a broken back, seizures, two bouts of pneumonia, atrial fibrillation, and a torn Achilles tendon." In July 2022, Murdoch collapsed in Oxfordshire from COVID-19-related complications. He was treated at Cromwell Hospital over the course of a week, and required the assistance of Lachlan to move.

=== Nevada trust law ===
It is not stated where the family trust was set up, but a key reason for challenging the terms in Nevada is that it allows changing the terms of a trust, using a method known as "decanting". This allows assets of one trust to be moved (or "poured") into a new trust with altered provisions. Nevada does not tax trusts at a state level nor mandate the reporting of trusts.

Nevada has strong privacy protections, which can be used to prevent publication of any details, which would not be allowed under Australian law and in most other places.

== Legal proceedings ==
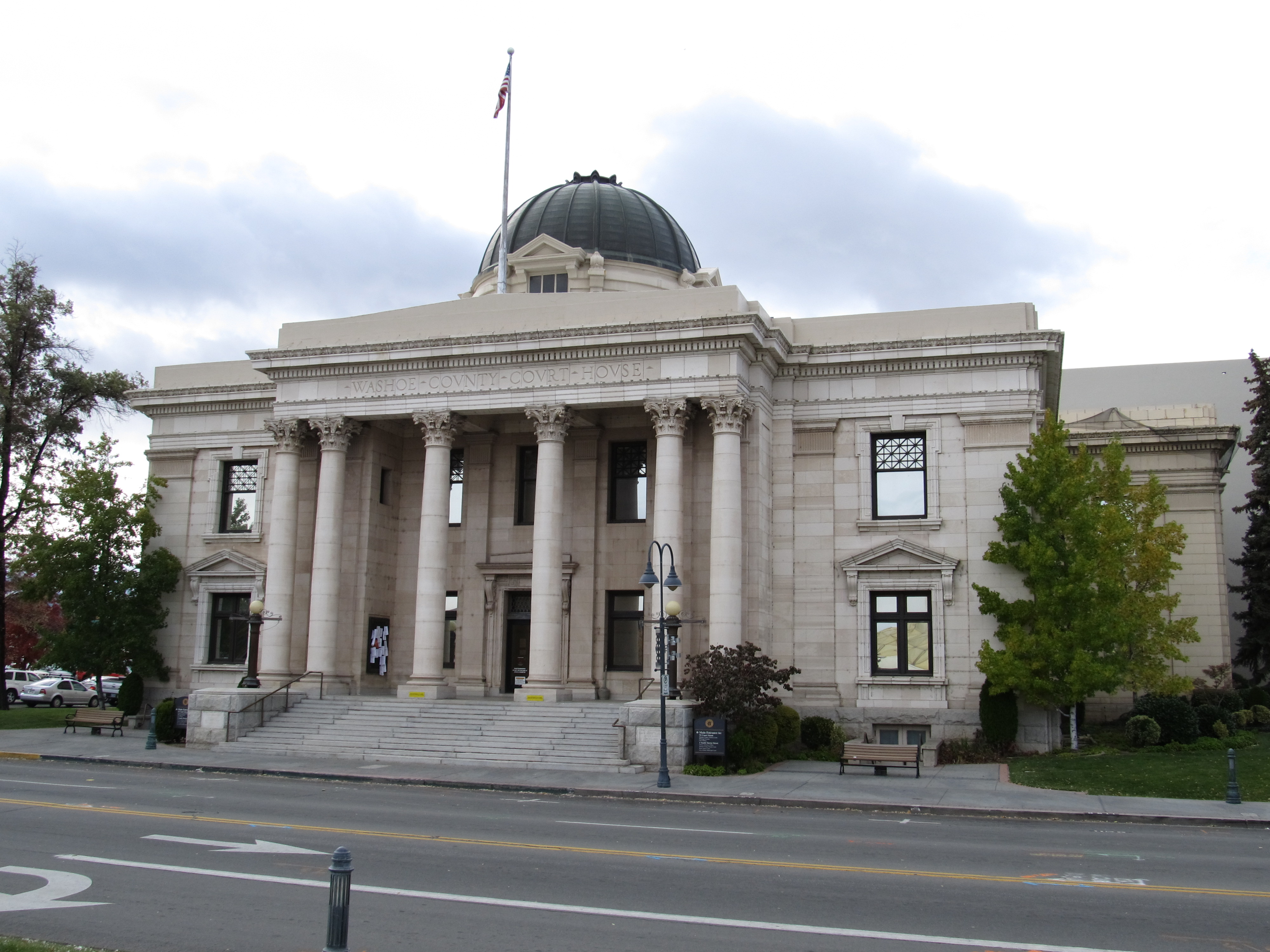
The legality of Murdoch's changes to his family's trust was decided at the Washoe County Courthouse.

=== Pre-trial motions ===
In June 2024, Nevada Second Judicial District Court probate commissioner Edmund Gorman Jr. ruled that Murdoch could amend the trust if he could argue that "he is acting in good faith and for the sole benefit of his heirs," according to The New York Times, which also reported that Rupert Murdoch wants his companies to remain politically conservative, and sees his other children as too politically liberal.

Alex Falconi, a software engineer who founded the organization Our Nevada Judges, petitioned Gorman to televise the trial. Six news organizations—the Associated Press, CNN, NPR, The New York Times, Reuters, and The Washington Post—filed a petition to unseal court proceedings and documents. The petitions were rejected on September 12, with the judge ruling that the case is "essentially a private legal arrangement".

=== Trial ===
The court described the case as "The Matter of the Doe 1 Trust, PR23-00813", and provided a public schedule of the case in a general docket on September 7, 2024.

James, Elisabeth, and Prudence were represented by Gary A. Bornstein of Cravath, Swaine & Moore; Rupert was represented by private wealth litigator Adam Streisand of Sheppard, Mullin, Richter & Hampton; and Lachlan by Alexander LeVeque of Solomon Dwiggins Freer & Steadman, Ltd. The trial began on September 16, 2024.

=== Conclusion ===
The trial concluded on September 23, 2024. The court had ruled against Rupert and Lachlan Murdoch, who, according to the commissioner's report, had acted in bad faith when trying to change the trust. Gorman's 96-page opinion included a description of Rupert Murdoch's plan as "a carefully crafted charade" to "permanently cement Lachlan Murdoch's executive roles" in the Murdoch companies, without regard to the effects of such control on the companies or other family members.

Rupert and Lachlan Murdoch's lawyer, Adam Streisand, stated on December 10 that they would appeal the verdict. There was speculation that if Murdoch lost the appeal before his death, he might sell the rest of his company. William Barr – who had been appointed president of the single trustee, Cruden Financial Services, by Rupert in 2023 – has also filed a challenge.

Rutgers Law School expert in estate planning Reid Kress Weisbord said that the verdict was exceptionally strongly worded, and may be difficult to appeal. A spokesperson for the three siblings said: "We welcome Commissioner Gorman's decision and hope that we can move beyond this litigation to focus on strengthening and rebuilding relationships among all family members."

== Settlement ==
On September 8, 2025, the Murdochs reached a $3.3 billion settlement, giving Lachlan control of News Corp. and Fox Corp. until at least 2050. Each of the other three siblings in the trust were awarded $1.1 billion, a much higher settlement than they had previously been offered. Lachlan's half-siblings Chloe and Grace remain non-voting beneficiaries in the family trust, entitled to one-third of the assets in the trust when they turn 30. This was agreed to by their mother Wendi Deng.

== Impact ==
The significance of the trial was linked to the influence of Fox News on the 2024 U.S. elections. The outlet has in the past publicly not only endorsed Donald Trump's presidency but also some of his more questionable assertions and conspiracy theories, including his big lie about the 2020 election being "stolen". After Trump's victory in November, Fox News attracted 70% of cable news watchers. Johanna Dunaway, research director of Syracuse University's Institute for Democracy, Journalism, and Citizenship in Washington and co-author of The House that Fox News Built?, said that Fox "wields direct influence over politicians... partly because they know Trump is watching".

Lachlan Murdoch has in the past not been as vocal as James about how climate change or other political issues have been treated on the network.

After Trump's inauguration as president in January 2025, Rupert was invited to the Oval Office, along with other influential people, in early February. Trump called Murdoch, along with Larry Ellison, "the most powerful people in the world" and "legends in business".

== In popular culture ==
The television series Succession concerns the succession of a fictional media empire known as Waystar Royco. Aspects of Succession were adapted from the Murdoch family. Screenwriter Jesse Armstrong intended to write a documentary on Murdoch, but abandoned the project in 2011. The litigation ultimately came about after the airing of the episode "Connor's Wedding" in 2023, in which the Rupert Murdoch-esque Logan Roy dies after falling ill. The chaotic depiction of the aftermath prompted representatives for Elisabeth Murdoch to request a plan that prevented such a situation from playing out in real life.

During and after the probate trial, several commenters made reference to the TV series.

A documentary series focusing on the succession, Dynasty: The Murdochs, directed by Liz Garbus and Sara Enright, was released on March 13, 2026, on Netflix.
