= Dan Cogan =

American film producer and director

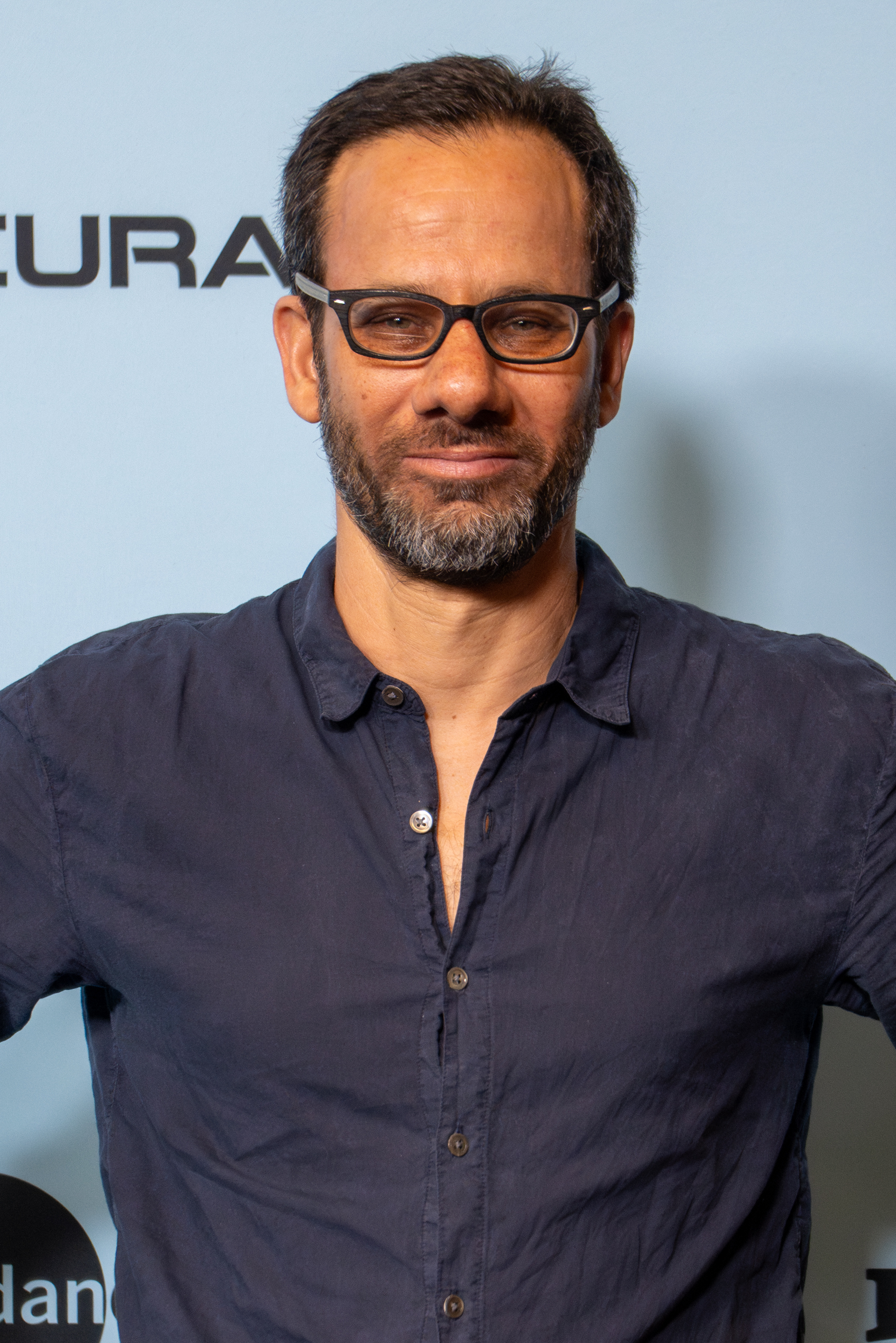
- Cogan at the 2025 Sundance Film Festival
- Occupations: Producer, director, writer
- Years active: 1997–present
- Spouse: Liz Garbus
- Children: 2

Dan Cogan is an American film producer. He has produced multiple documentary films including The Queen of Versailles (2012), How to Survive a Plague (2012), The Hunting Ground (2015), Icarus (2017), Won't You Be My Neighbor (2018), On the Record (2020), and has produced documentary series including I'll Be Gone in the Dark (2020), and Allen v. Farrow (2021). Cogan is the co-founder of Impact Partners, Gamechanger Films, and Story Syndicate.

Cogan has won an Academy Award and a Primetime Emmy Award for Icarus and The Apollo (2019), and has been nominated for two other Emmy awards.

== Career ==
In 2007, Cogan co-founded Impact Partners, a documentary film and television production company alongside Geralyn Dreyfous. Cogan has produced multiple films which have gone on to receive Academy Award for Best Documentary Feature nominations including Hell and Back Again, directed by Danfung Dennis, How to Survive a Plague by David France, and Icarus, directed by Bryan Fogel, which won the award. By January 2020, Cogan stepped down and began serving as an advisor to the company.

Cogan has been nominated for three Primetime Emmy Awards, for Icarus, The Fourth Estate, The Apollo, which won the award, and Allen v. Farrow. For his work on the docuseries Nuclear Family he was a nominee for a 2021 Peabody Award.

In 2013, Cogan co-founded Gamechanger Films, a production company dedicated to financing films directed by women. In June 2019, Cogan co-founded Story Syndicate, a film and television production company alongside Liz Garbus.

== Personal life ==
Cogan is married to Liz Garbus, and the two have two children together.

== Filmography ==
- 2026: Taken: Natalee Holloway (executive producer)
- 2026: A Killer Story (executive producer)
- 2026: Rapinoe (producer)
- 2026: Dynasty: The Murdochs (executive producer)
- 2026: Give Me the Ball! (producer)
- 2025: One Night in Idaho: The College Murders (executive producer)
- 2025: Titan: The OceanGate Disaster (executive producer)
- 2025: Gone Girls: The Long Island Serial Killer (executive producer)
- 2025: Last Take: Rust and the Story of Halyna (executive producer)
- 2025: Sally (producer)
- 2023: Last Call: When a Serial Killer Stalked Queer New York (executive producer)
- 2023: Stolen Youth: Inside the Cult at Sarah Lawrence (executive producer)
- 2022: Harry & Meghan (executive producer)
- 2021: Mayor Pete (producer)
- 2021: Fauci (producer)
- 2021: Becoming Cousteau (producer)
- 2021: Dear Mr. Brody (executive producer)
- 2021: Allen v. Farrow (executive producer)
- 2020: All In: The Fight for Democracy (producer)
- 2020: Love & Stuff (executive producer)
- 2020: Us Kids (executive producer)
- 2020: Spaceship Earth (executive producer)
- 2020: On the Record (executive producer)
- 2019: The Apollo (executive producer)
- 2018: Bathtubs Over Broadway (executive producer)
- 2018: Divide and Conquer: The Roger Ailes Story (executive producer)
- 2018: The Long Dumb Road (executive producer)
- 2018: Bisbee '17 (executive producer)
- 2018: Nancy (co-executive producer)
- 2018: The Tale (executive producer)
- 2018: Won't You Be My Neighbor? (executive producer)
- 2017: Voyeur (executive producer)
- 2017: Of Fathers and Sons (executive producer)
- 2017: Hunting Season (executive producer)
- 2017: Insha'Allah Democracy (executive producer)
- 2017: The Reagan Show (executive producer)
- 2017: The Strange Ones (co-executive producer)
- 2017: Bending the Arc (executive producer)
- 2017: Step (executive producer)
- 2017: Dina (executive producer)
- 2017: Icarus (producer)
- 2017: Unrest (executive producer)
- 2016: Independent Lens (TV series)
- 2016: City of Joy (executive producer)
- 2016: Buster's Mal Heart (executive producer)
- 2016: Theo Who Lived (executive producer)
- 2016: Death by Design (executive producer)
- 2016: Night School (executive producer)
- 2016: The Pearl (executive producer)
- 2016: Lovesong (executive producer)
- 2016: Notes on Blindness (executive producer)
- 2016: Nuts! (executive producer)
- 2014: P.O.V. (TV series) (executive producer - 3 episodes, 2012 - 2015)
- 2015: Havana Motor Club (executive producer)
- 2015: Song of Lahore (executive producer)
- 2015: Addicted to Fresno (executive producer)
- 2015: The Invitation (executive producer)
- 2015: Dreamcatcher (executive producer)
- 2015: Chuck Norris vs Communism (executive producer)
- 2015: Sembene! (executive producer)
- 2015: The Hunting Ground (executive producer)
- 2015: How to Change the World (executive producer)
- 2014: Do I Sound Gay? (executive producer)
- 2014: Meet the Patels (executive producer)
- 2014: The Vanquishing of the Witch Baba Yaga (executive producer)
- 2014: Vessel (executive producer)
- 2014: Watchers of the Sky (executive producer)
- 2014: Land Ho! (executive producer)
- 2013: Midway (executive producer)
- 2013: Remote Area Medical (executive producer)
- 2013: Our Nixon (executive producer)
- 2013: American Promise (co-executive producer)
- 2013: Pandora's Promise (executive producer)
- 2013: The Crash Reel (executive producer: Impact Partners)
- 2013: Who is Dayani Cristal? (executive producer)
- 2013: Anita: Speaking Truth to Power (executive producer)
- 2012: Sofia's Last Ambulance (executive producer)
- 2012: Knuckleball! (producer)
- 2012: How to Survive a Plague (executive producer)
- 2012: Detropia (executive producer)
- 2012: The Queen of Versailles (executive producer)
- 2011: Lemon (executive producer)
- 2011: Fightville (executive producer)
- 2011: Bobby Fischer Against the World (executive producer)
- 2011: Chess History (video short) (executive producer)
- 2011: Hell and Back Again (executive producer)
- 2011: The Fight for Fischer's Estate (video short) (executive producer)
- 2010: Lost Bohemia (executive producer)
- 2010: One Thousand Pictures: RFK's Last Journey (short) (executive producer)
- 2010: Sons of Perdition (supervising producer)
- 2010: Secrets of the Tribe (executive producer: Impact Partners)
- 2009: American Experience (TV series) (co-producer - 1 episode)
- 2009: Children of Invention (executive producer)
- 2009: No Impact Man: The Documentary (executive producer)
- 2008: The Trials of J. Robert Oppenheimer (co-producer)
- 2008: The End of America (supervising producer)
- 2008: The Garden (supervising producer)
- 2008: Lioness (supervising producer)
- 2008: Kick Like a Girl (short) (supervising producer)
- 2008: Secrecy (supervising producer)
- 2008: The Recruiter (supervising producer)
- 2007: Freeheld (short) (supervising producer)
- 2005: Torte Bluma (short) (producer)
- 1999: The Lifestyle (producer)
- 1997: Number One Fan (producer)

== Externals ==
- Official website
- Dan Cogan at Impact Partners Film
- Dan Cogan at IMDb
