= All In: The Fight for Democracy =

2020 documentary film directed by Liz Garbus and Lisa Cortés

- Official poster
- Directed by: Liz Garbus; Lisa Cortés
- Written by: Jack Youngelson
- Produced by: Liz Garbus; Lisa Cortés; Dan Cogan; Stacey Abrams
- Starring: Stacey Abrams
- Cinematography: Wolfgang Held
- Edited by: Nancy Novack
- Music by: Gil Talmi; Meshell Ndegeocello
- Production company: Story Syndicate
- Distributed by: Amazon Studios
- Release date: September 9, 2020 (United States)
- Running time: 102 minutes
- Country: United States
- Language: English

All In: The Fight for Democracy is a 2020 American documentary film directed and produced by Liz Garbus and Lisa Cortés. The film revolves around voter suppression. Stacey Abrams worked with Garbus and Cortés on the film. It was released in a limited theatrical release on September 9, 2020, followed by digital streaming on Amazon Prime Video on September 18, 2020, by Amazon Studios. Originally Abrams, a Georgia state representative, did not intend to be part of the film; eventually, she agreed to include her gubernatorial race as part of the story.

== Cast ==
- Stacey Abrams
- Carol Anderson
- Sean J. Young
- Lauren Groh-Wargo
- O.J. Semans
- Barbara Semans
- Kristen Clarke
- Michael Waldman
- Desmond Meade
- Eric Holder
- Marcia Fudge
- Alejandra Gomez
- Eric Foner
- Debo Adegbile
- Jayla Allen
- Michael Parsons
- Luci Baines Johnson
- Francis Fox Piven
- Andrew Young
- Bert Rein

== Release ==
In June 2020, Amazon Studios acquired distribution rights to the film, with intention to release before the 2020 United States presidential election. It was released in a limited theatrical release on September 9, 2020, followed by digital streaming on Amazon Prime Video on September 18, 2020. It was set to have its world premiere at the Telluride Film Festival in September 2020, prior to its cancellation due to the COVID-19 pandemic.

On September 9, 2020, coinciding with the film's release, musician Janelle Monáe released the single "Turntables", a song which was featured in the film.

== Critical reception ==
On review aggregator website Rotten Tomatoes, the film holds an approval rating of 100% based on 66 reviews, with an average of 8/10. The site's critics consensus reads: "All In: The Fight for Democracy lives up to its title as a galvanizing rallying cry for voters to exercise—and preserve—their right to be heard." On Metacritic, the film has a weighted average score of 78 out of 100, based on eight critics, indicating "generally favorable" reviews.

Craig Matheson of The Age said that the film was "sobering viewing, especially with a policy rooted in the 19th century growing stronger in the 21st." Linda Marric of NME gave the film 4/5 stars, writing, "Although a little repetitive in parts, All In: The Fight For Democracy is essential viewing for anyone wanting to understand how things are likely to unravel in the weeks to come." Writing for the Los Angeles Times, Kevin Crust said the film "manages the triple-E feat of being entertaining, educational and enlightening."
