= Beba (film) =

- Theatrical release poster
- Directed by: Rebeca Huntt
- Screenplay by: Rebeca Huntt
- Produced by: Sofia Geld; Rebeca Huntt
- Cinematography: Sophia Stieglitz
- Edited by: Isabel Freeman
- Music by: Holland Andrews
- Production companies: Onyx Collective; Beba Film
- Distributed by: Neon
- Release dates: September 11, 2021 (Toronto International Film Festival); June 24, 2022 (United States)
- Running time: 79 minutes
- Countries: United States; Mexico
- Languages: English; Spanish
- Box office: $16,254

Beba is a 2021 documentary film directed, written, and produced by Rebeca Huntt. The plot follows a young bred Afro-Latina stares down historical, societal, and generational trauma with unflinching courage.

The film premiered at the Toronto International Film Festival on September 11, 2021, and was released in the United States on June 24, 2022. The film received generally positive reviews from critics.

== Synopsis ==
Race is central to Beba’s story. She carries the ancestry of her dark-skinned Dominican father and light-skinned Venezuelan mother, immigrants who met in New York. Her father rose from poverty into the working class, moving his family into “the best I could afford” — a rent-controlled one-bedroom apartment. For a family of five, it was a combustible environment of spiky personalities, rage, and rebellion. Huntt probes the psychic wounds that family members inflict on one another, not sparing herself from scrutiny. Gaining admission into Bard College, she pivots between social circles divided by race and class, coming away with potent observations.

— Toronto International Film Festival

== Release ==
Beba first premiered at the Toronto International Film Festival on February 11, 2021. The film also premiered at the Miami Film Festival on March 8, 2022, DocAviv on May 28, 2022, the Tribeca Festival on June 14, 2022, and at the Provincetown International Film Festival on June 16, 2022. On October 1, 2021, Neon acquired the film distribution rights to the film, and released it to select theaters on June 24, 2022.

== Reception ==
On the review aggregator website Rotten Tomatoes, 83% of 36 critics' reviews are positive, with an average rating of 6.6/10. The website's consensus reads: "Beba's narrow point of view limits its impact to an extent, but this remains an impressive work of introspective documentary filmmaking." Metacritic, which uses a weighted average, assigned the film a score of 73 out of 100, based on 13 critics, indicating "generally favorable" reviews.
