= Janet Tobias =

American film director

Janet L. Tobias
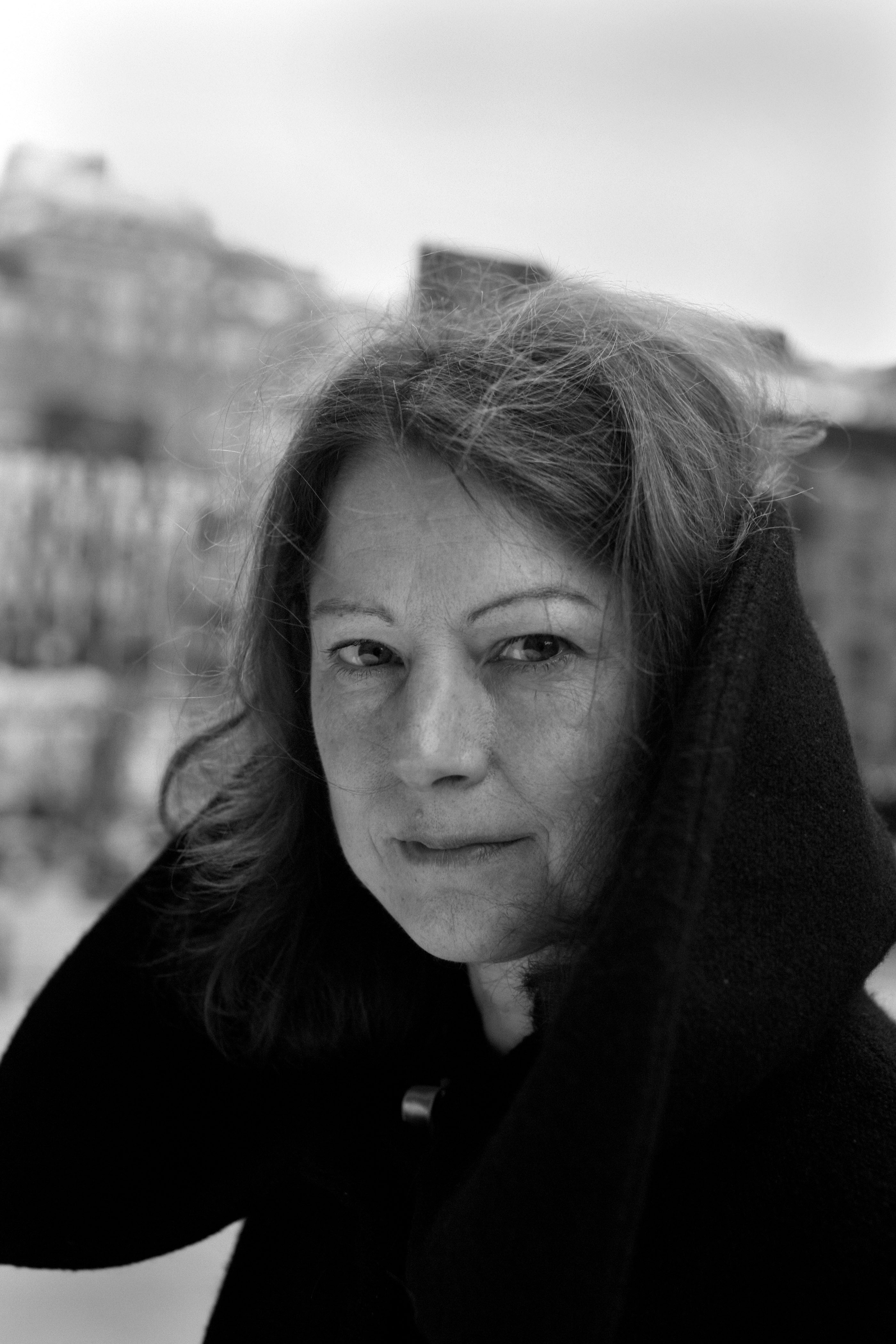
- Occupations: Film director, producer, and screenwriter
- Known for: No Place On Earth
- Website: Sierra/Tango Productions

Janet Tobias is a media executive specializing in healthcare as well as an Emmy Award-winning director, producer, and writer.

She directed Fauci, and also No Place On Earth in 2012, a docudrama about two caves in Ukraine in which three dozen Jews escaping the Holocaust successfully hid for a total of 511 days. Her screenplay, co-written with Paul Laikin, was a finalist for the 2014 Award for Documentary Screenplay from the Writers Guild of America.

More recently, Tobias directed Unseen Enemy, a documentary on the threat of pandemics in the 21st century which initially aired on CNN in 2017. 2018 saw the release of her documentary Memory Games, a glimpse into the brain's vast potential for memorization through the eyes of four memory competition participants.

== Career ==
After growing up in Indiana, graduating from Yale University, and working in radio news, Tobias started her television career at CBS's 60 Minutes as Diane Sawyer's associate producer. She then moved to ABC's Prime Time Live, where she produced, wrote, and directed both domestic and international stories ranging from a case study of organ donation to a portrait of the Kuwaiti royal family after the Gulf War.

In 1992, Tobias moved to Dateline NBC to work as a national producer, supervising pieces on medical ethics and the home health care industry. Following Dateline, she worked as an editorial producer of ABC News' Law and Justice unit where she developed stories for Nightline, 20/20, and World News Tonight; she was also the executive producer for PBS's Emmy Award-winning program Life 360.

In 2001, she founded a television and film production company called Sierra/Tango Productions with former ABC anchor Forrest Sawyer. Sierra/Tango has produced over a dozen documentaries on social issues ranging from medical ethics to the life of teenagers in America. Tobias is also the founder of Ikana Health, which focuses on the mobile web, social media and video as it relates to healthcare information and improving patient outcomes.

In 2009, Tobias was appointed to the Forum on Drug Discovery, Development and Translation of the Institute of Medicine at the National Academy of Sciences, serving two terms until 2015. In 2010, she became an adjunct professor of medicine in the Department of Health Evidence & Policy at Mount Sinai School of Medicine where she works on preventing diabetes in minority populations. In 2014, she became a research professor of global public health in New York University's College of Global Public Health.

Ms. Tobias is a member of the Writers Guild of America and currently resides in New York City.

== Filmography ==
The following are among Tobias's commercial films:

Year	Title	Director	Producer	Writer
2001	Frontline (Juvenile Justice)	Yes	Yes	Yes
2012	No Place On Earth	Yes	Yes	Yes
2017	CNN: Unseen Enemy	Yes	Yes	Yes
2018	Memory Games	Yes	Yes	Yes
2021	Fauci	Yes	Yes	No

Executive producer

- Y2K: The Winter of Our Disconnect (1999)
- PBS: Life 360 series (2001-2002)
- MSNBC Investigates: Nature's Weapon: The Hidden Plague (2003)
- MSNBC Reports: The Next War (2003)
- MSNBC: Battle for America's Schools (2003)
- History Channel: Voices of Civil Rights (2005)

Senior producer

- Nightline (2000)

== Awards ==
- National Emmy and American Bar Association awards
- 2 Cine Golden Eagles'
- The George Foster Peabody Award
- 2 Casey Medals for Meritorious Journalism
- National Headliner Award
- Sigma Delta Chi Award
- Honorable mention Robert F. Kennedy Journalism and Overseas Press Awards
- Hampton's International Film Festival Audience Award
