= Joseph Sexton =

Journalist

- Education: University of Wisconsin–Madison (BA)
- Occupation: Journalist
- Notable credit(s): The New York Times, United Press International, The City Sun

Joseph Sexton is an American journalist. At The New York Times he held the titles of Metropolitan Editor, as well as Sports Editor. He is the author of the non-fiction book The Lost Sons of Omaha, published by Scribner in 2023.

== Biography ==
Sexton was raised in Brooklyn, one of seven siblings in an Irish Catholic family. He attended St. Saviour's grammar school, graduated from Xavier High School in Manhattan, and later the University of Wisconsin with a degree in English Literature. He was awarded a graduate fellowship at the school of journalism at the University of Texas in Austin.

== Career ==
In 1984, Sexton was a founding member of The City Sun, a Black weekly newspaper based in Brooklyn. He covered sports, politics and crime. He worked for the sports desk of United Press International, and after that as a sports reporter for the Syracuse Post-Standard. In 1987, he began working as a sports reporter for The New York Times, and was made a staff writer in 1988. He covered the Rangers and Islanders of the National Hockey League, and the ignominious Mets of the early 1990s. His profile of Brett Hull for the Times Sunday Magazine was published by Houghton Mifflin.

In 1994, he began as a reporter on the Metro staff of the Times, and as the paper's Brooklyn bureau chief, he covered education, crime, politics, health care, and the impact of the federal welfare reform legislation of 1996. He contributed to the paper's coverage of police corruption.

His long career as a senior editor at the Times began in 1998. He was responsible for exclusive reporting on the scandal of the 2002 Winter Olympics in Salt Lake City, the outrage involving the under-funded athletic programs in the city's public schools, and the deadly consequences of failing to regulate boxing in the sport's lower ranks. In 1999, Sexton became the deputy Metropolitan editor in charge of enterprise and investigations. He helped run coverage of the 9/11 terror attacks, the crash of EgyptAir Flight 990, the Anthrax scare, the fatal failings of New York's care for the mentally ill, and the deadly consequences of delinquent medical treatment for those incarcerated in the state's jails.

Sexton was named Metropolitan Editor of the Times in 2006, and his staff over the next five years produced work on the downfall of New York Gov. Eliot Spitzer, and the life and challenges of an imam in America in the years after 9/11.

From 2011 to 2013, Sexton served as Sports Editor, returning to the desk at which he had begun his career at the Times. The Times's sports department led the coverage of the Penn State sex scandal, and the department's devastating series on the short, violent life of a hockey enforcer, titled "Punched Out" and written by John Branch, was a 2012 finalist for the Pulitzer Prize for Feature Writing. In 2013, Branch won the Pulitzer feature writing award for "Snow Fall," a seminal achievement in online storytelling involving a fatal avalanche.

Sexton left the Times in 2013 to join ProPublica as a senior editor for the independent non-profit news organization based in New York. At ProPublica, he also returned to reporting and writing, and in 2021, Sexton received Columbia University's prestigious Meyer Berger Award for distinguished human interest storytelling.

Sexton's first book, The Lost Sons of Omaha, a work of nonfiction chronicling a distinctive American tragedy of the killing of James Scurlock in the aftermath of the murder of George Floyd by a police officer, was published by Scribner in May 2023.

== Bibliography ==
=== Anthologies ===
- McGuane, Thomas; and Stout, Glenn. The Best American Sports Writing 1992. New York: Houghton Mifflin, 1992. ISBN 0-395-60340-4 ISBN 978-0395603406
