= Fauci (film) =

- Theatrical release poster
- Directed by: John Hoffman; Janet Tobias
- Produced by: Janet Tobias; John Hoffman; Alexandra Moss; Jon Bardin; Roger Lopez; Mark Monroe
- Starring: Anthony Fauci
- Cinematography: Claudia Raschke
- Edited by: Brian Chamberlain; Amy Foote
- Music by: Daniel Hart
- Production companies: National Geographic Documentary Films; Story Syndicate; Sierra Tango; Better World Projects; Diamond Docs
- Distributed by: Magnolia Pictures
- Release dates: September 2, 2021 (Telluride); September 10, 2021 (United States)
- Running time: 104 minutes
- Country: United States
- Language: English

Fauci is a 2021 American documentary film, directed and produced by John Hoffman and Janet Tobias, and produced by Alexandra Moss. It follows the life and career of Anthony Fauci. Liz Garbus serves as an executive producer under her Story Syndicate banner.

The film had its world premiere at the 48th Telluride Film Festival on September 2, 2021. It was released on September 10, 2021, by Magnolia Pictures. It has received generally positive reviews from critics.

== Synopsis ==
The film follows the life and career of Anthony Fauci, who has led the US response to the COVID-19 pandemic and the AIDS/HIV epidemic.

== Production ==
In February 2021, it was announced that Anthony Fauci would star in a documentary film, with John Hoffman and Janet Tobias set to direct and produce. The film was set to be produced by National Geographic Documentary Films, and executive produced by Liz Garbus under her Story Syndicate banner.

Production on the film took place in secret, due to Fauci not wanting President Donald Trump to find out about the film, with production taking place in his office at the National Institute of Health, and at his home once the COVID-19 vaccine was released. Fauci was not paid for appearing in the film, nor did he have any creative control over the film.

== Release ==
The film had its world premiere at the 48th Telluride Film Festival on September 2, 2021. It was released on September 10, 2021, by Magnolia Pictures, prior to streaming on Disney+ in October 2021.

== Critical response ==
On the review aggregator website Rotten Tomatoes, 86% of 42 critics' reviews are positive. The website's consensus reads: "Fauci isn't the cure for the common bio-doc, but it offers an entertaining and edifying overview of a life largely spent in public service." Metacritic, which uses a weighted average, assigned the film a score of 70 out of 100, based on 10 critics, indicating "generally favorable" reviews.

Brian Lowry of CNN wrote that the film "celebrates a life devoted to public service and the politicization of the response to Covid-19, in roughly that order ... lauding a figure whose critics have seemingly twisted his image beyond recognition in their attempts to demonize him." Peter Bradshaw of The Guardian gave the "laudatory but lenient" film a score of 4/5 stars; finding it "easy to agree with its praise for Fauci’s intellectual heroism, especially when reactionary anti-science charlatanism is running rampant across the internet and the political right." David Ehrlich of IndieWire gave the film a grade of B−, describing it as "a fittingly sober and unflashy biodoc that's far less engaging as a portrait of a public servant … than it is as a testament to the values he’s embodied during his many decades of being America’s doctor."

Edward Porter of The Times gave the film a score of 3/5 stars as "a worthwhile account, partly because it looks at Fauci’s whole career." Robert Abele of the Los Angeles Times wrote that the film is "strategically timed [to counter] the right-wing animosity for "America's Doctor"; justifying the film's being occasionally "as machine-stamped for adulatory portraiture as a commercial bio doc can be." G. Allen Johnson of the San Francisco Chronicle described the film as "a mostly admiring documentary, clearly enamored with its subject who has attained movie-star-level fame", and added: "But it doesn't let Fauci off the hook from some of the NIH's early missteps during the AIDS crisis, and his assertion early in the current pandemic that wearing masks was not necessary. Fauci doesn’t find its subject perfect, but honest and human." Neal Justin of the Star Tribune wrote: "If the goal was to humanize the 80-year-old talking head, filmmakers John Hoffman and Janet Tobias have succeeded."

Lisa Kennedy of The New York Times wrote that the film "is at its best when it draws parallels between the pandemics that define Dr. Fauci's career", but added: "It vexes when it leans on straightforward biography ... the timing of the documentary’s more traditional biographical gestures feels more appropriate to a retrospective consideration, one that has the current pandemic in the rearview mirror." Danny Leigh of the Financial Times gave the film a score of 3 out of 5 stars, calling it "An admiring film that still ends up doing him a disservice."

Armond White of National Review gave a negative review of the film, writing: "Propagandists who work at the behest of media corporations and institutions willingly bow to authority, and [the film] idolizes Fauci as the face and voice of that authority. Instead of investigating Fauci's despotic sense of moral superiority to enlighten the general public, [National Geographic]'s narrowcast promotional doc chooses persuasion over education."

=== Accolades ===
Year	Award	Category	Recipient	Result	Ref.
2021	Critics' Choice Documentary Awards	Best Historical or Biographical Documentary	Fauci	Nominated	
2021	Critics' Choice Documentary Awards	Best Science/Nature Documentary	Fauci	Nominated	
2021	Critics' Choice Documentary Awards	Most Compelling Living Subjects of a Documentary	Anthony Fauci	Nominated	
