= Matthew Galkin =

American film director and producer

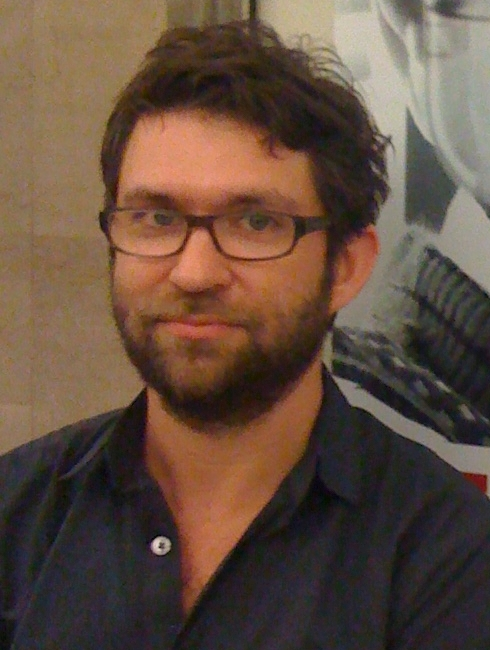
- Galkin at the HBO premiere of Kevorkian, June 24, 2010
- Born: Matthew Galkin
- Occupations: Film director, television producer
- Years active: 2004–present
- Website: fairhavenfilms.com

Matthew Galkin is an American director and producer.

== Early life and education ==
Matthew Galkin was born in Rhode Island and grew up in Shaker Heights, Ohio.

== Career ==
Over the course of his career, Galkin has made dozens of projects, including numerous films for HBO.

He started his directing career with loudQUIETloud, a film about legendary rock band the Pixies.

He also directed Kevorkian, the only all-access biographical film ever made about famed assisted suicide doctor Jack Kevorkian, and I Am an Animal: The Story of Ingrid Newkirk and PETA, about the founder of the infamous animal rights organization.

In 2023, his work Murder in Big Horn premiered at the 2023 Sundance Film Festival and was nominated for a 2024 Independent Spirit Award. He also created Showtime’s first-ever true crime series Murder in the Bayou.

Prior to starting the production company Fairhaven in 2018, Galkin was partners with Super Size Me filmmaker Morgan Spurlock at NY-based company Warrior Poets, where his work included the IDA Award-winning CNN series Inside Man; Super Size Me 2: Holy Chicken!, which premiered at the 2017 Toronto Film Festival; and the film One Direction: This is Us for Sony Pictures, one of the highest grossing concert films of all time.

== Filmography ==
Year	Title	Role	Ref
2006	loudQUIETloud	Director	
2007	I Am an Animal	Director	
2010	Kevorkian		
