= 72nd Academy Awards =

- Official poster by Arnold Schwartzman
- Date: March 26, 2000
- Site: Shrine Auditorium; Los Angeles, California, U.S.
- Hosted by: Billy Crystal
- Preshow hosts: Tyra Banks; Chris Connelly; Meredith Vieira
- Produced by: Richard D. Zanuck; Lili Fini Zanuck
- Directed by: Louis J. Horvitz

Highlights
- Best Picture: American Beauty
- Most awards: American Beauty (5)
- Most nominations: American Beauty (8)

TV in the United States
- Network: ABC
- Duration: 4 hours, 9 minutes
- Ratings: 46.52 million 29.64% (Nielsen ratings)

The 72nd Academy Awards ceremony, presented by the Academy of Motion Picture Arts and Sciences (AMPAS), honored films released in 1999 and took place on March 26, 2000, at the Shrine Auditorium in Los Angeles, beginning at 5:30 p.m. PST / 8:30 p.m. EST. During the ceremony, the AMPAS presented Academy Awards (commonly referred to as Oscars) in 23 categories. The ceremony, televised in the United States by ABC, was produced by husband-and-wife producing team Richard and Lili Fini Zanuck and was directed by Louis J. Horvitz. Actor Billy Crystal hosted the show for the seventh time. He first presided over the 62nd ceremony held in 1990 and had last hosted the 70th ceremony held in 1998. Three weeks earlier in a ceremony at the Regent Beverly Wilshire Hotel in Beverly Hills, California held on March 4, the Academy Awards for Technical Achievement were presented by host Salma Hayek.

American Beauty won five awards, including Best Picture. Other winners included The Matrix with four awards, The Cider House Rules and Topsy-Turvy with two, and All About My Mother, Boys Don't Cry, Girl, Interrupted, King Gimp, My Mother Dreams the Satan's Disciples in New York, The Old Man and the Sea, One Day in September, The Red Violin, Sleepy Hollow, and Tarzan with one. The telecast garnered almost 47 million viewers in the United States.

== Winners and nominees ==
The nominees for the 72nd Academy Awards were announced on February 15, 2000, at 5:38 a.m. PST (13:38 UTC) at the Samuel Goldwyn Theater in Beverly Hills, California, by Robert Rehme, president of the academy, and the actor Dustin Hoffman. American Beauty received the most nominations with eight total; The Cider House Rules and The Insider tied for second with seven nominations each.

The winners were announced during the awards ceremony on March 26, 2000. Due to her 12th nomination, Meryl Streep tied Katharine Hepburn as the performer with most acting nominations. At the age of 79, Richard Farnsworth became the oldest male acting nominee in Oscars history. Sam Mendes was the sixth person to win Best Director for his directorial debut. By virtue of her father Jon Voight's Best Lead Actor win for 1978's Coming Home, Best Supporting Actress winner Angelina Jolie and Voight became the second father-daughter Oscar acting winners.

=== Awards ===
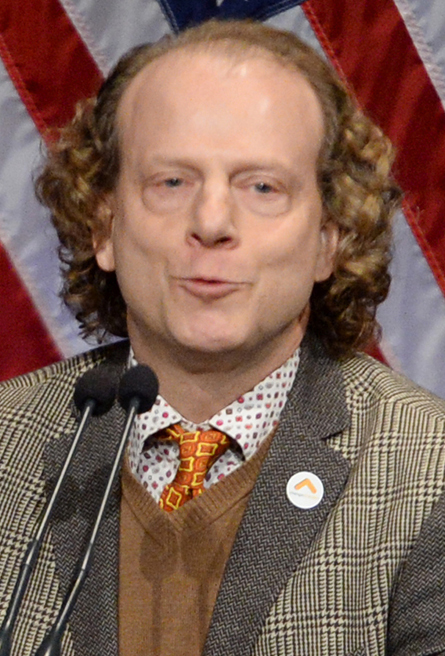
Bruce Cohen, Best Picture co-winner

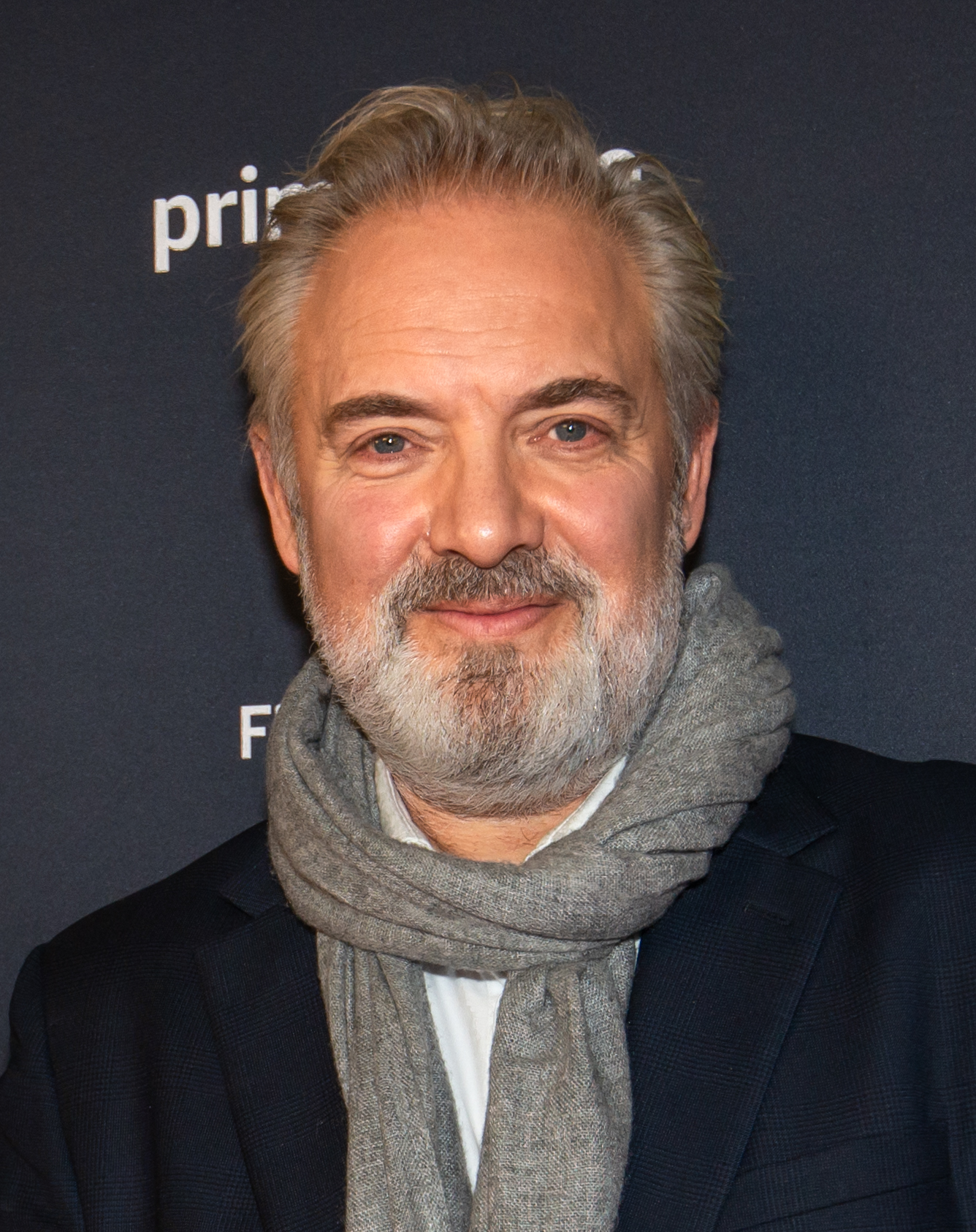
Sam Mendes, Best Director winner

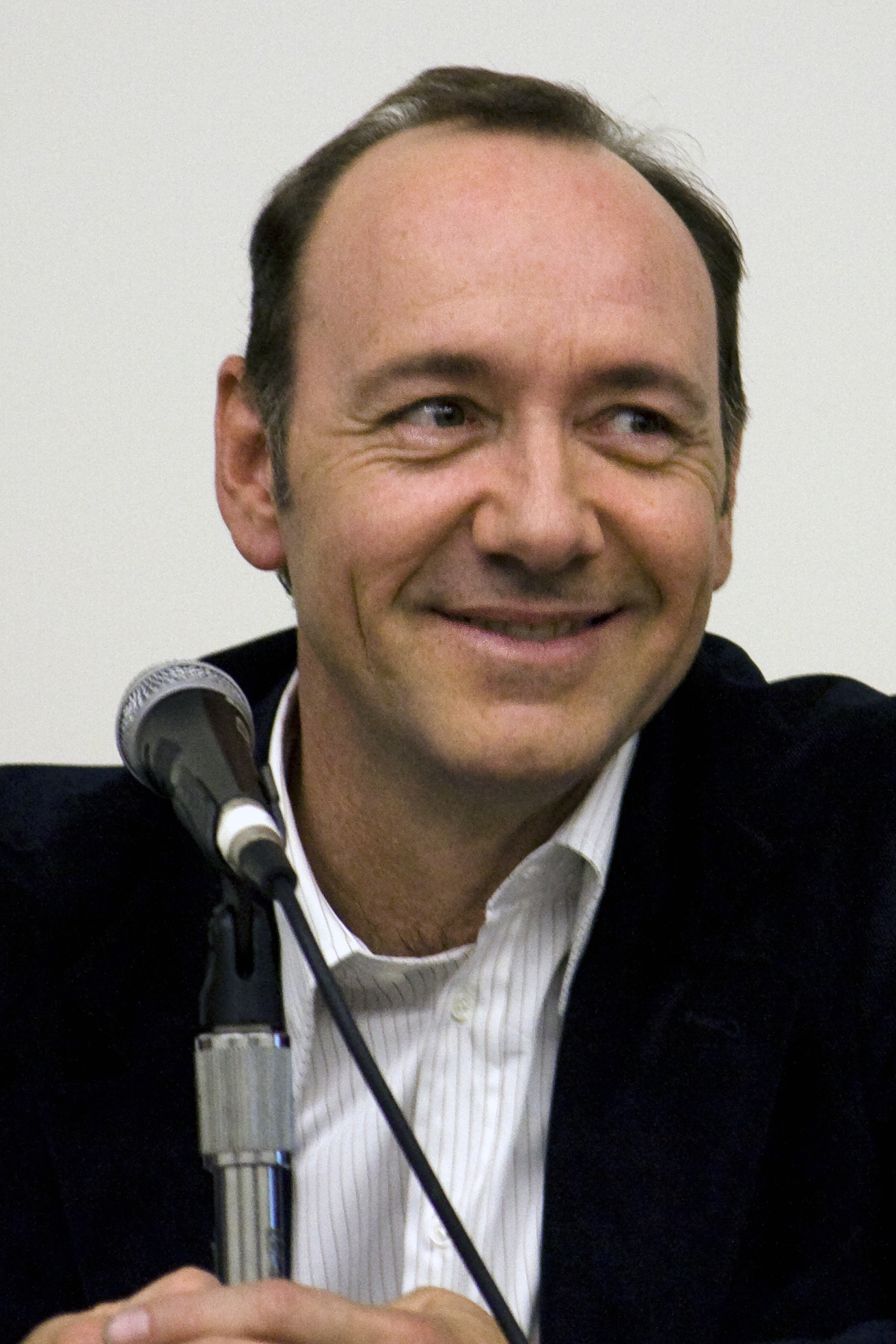
Kevin Spacey, Best Actor winner

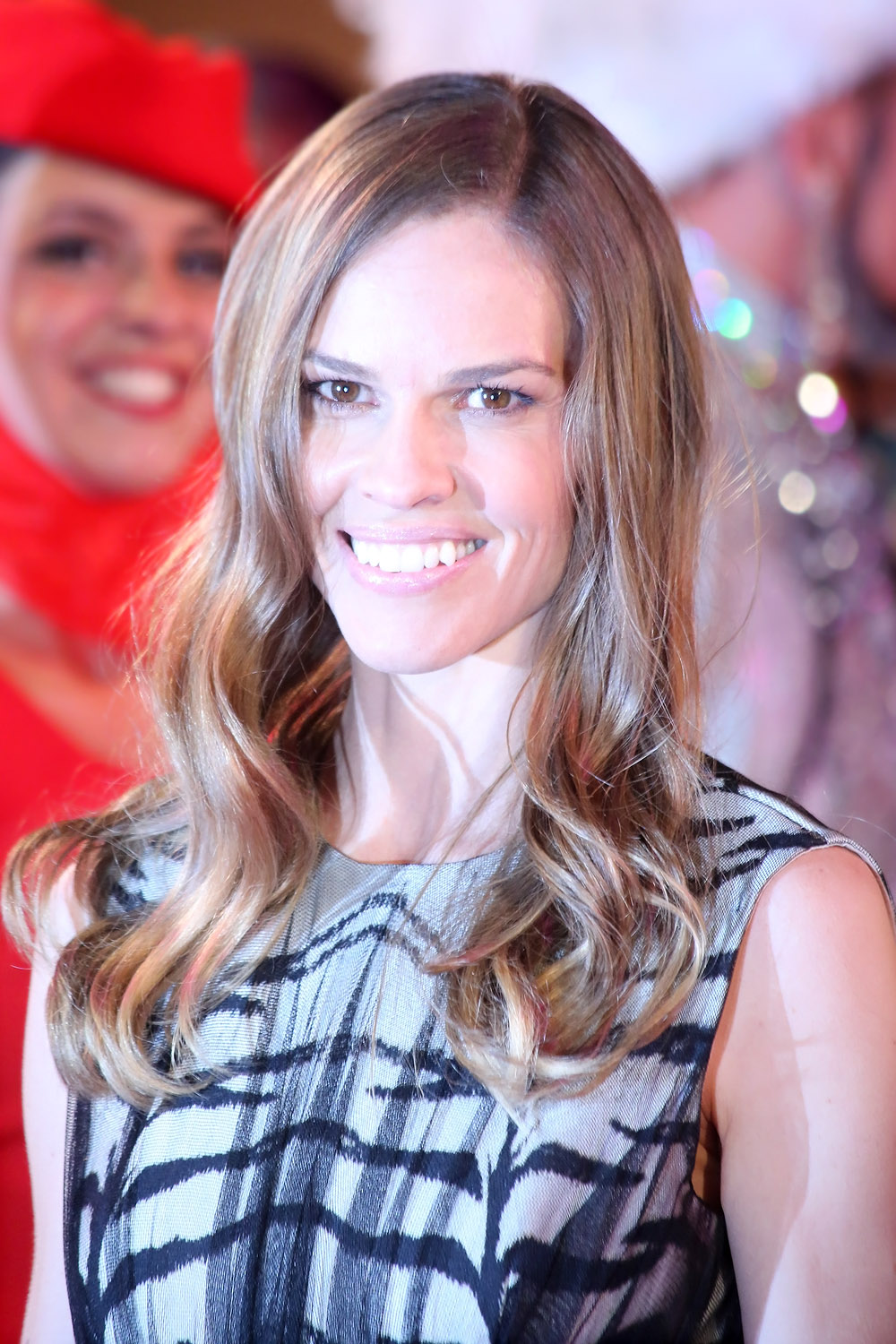
Hilary Swank, Best Actress winner

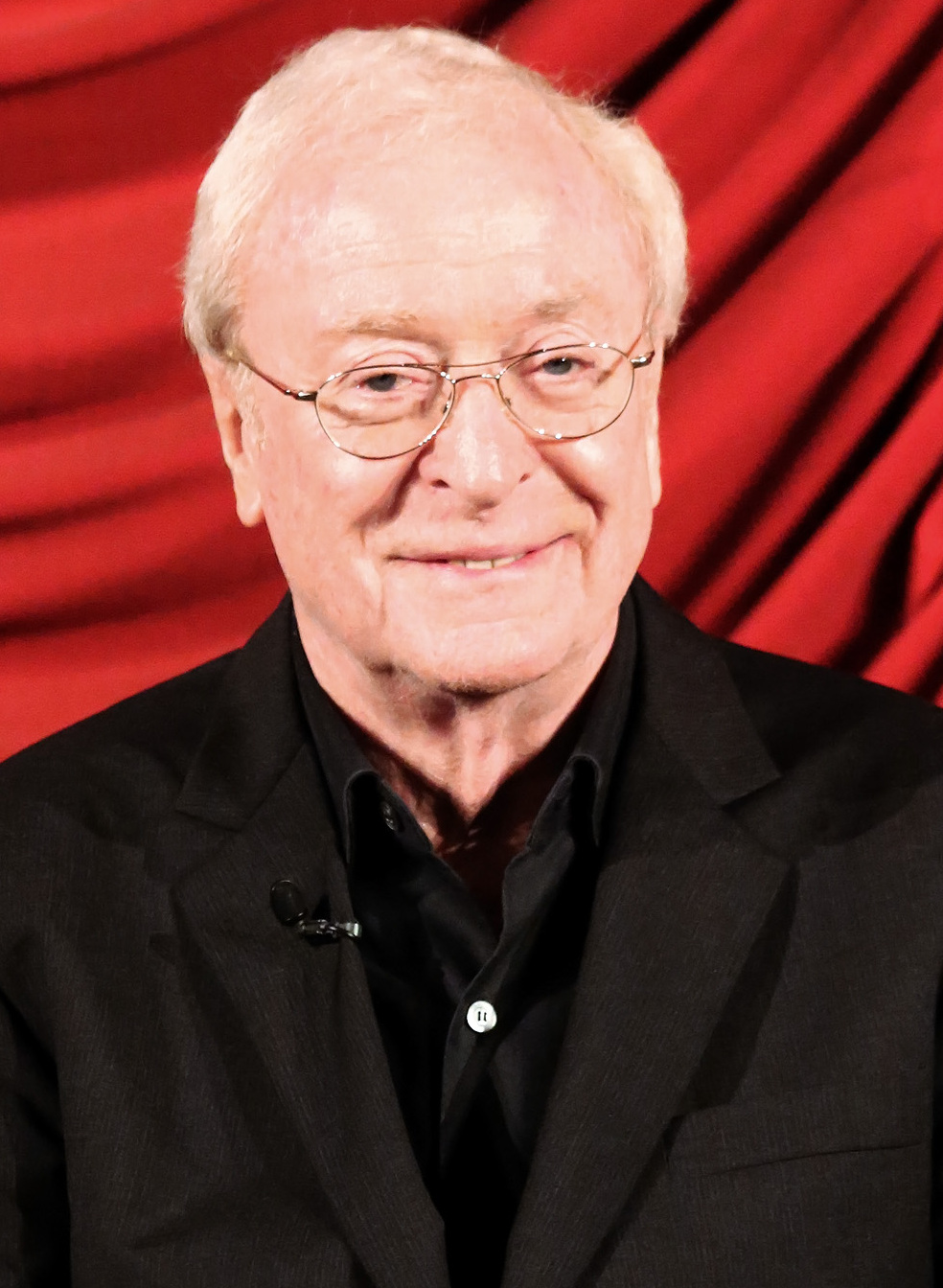
Michael Caine, Best Supporting Actor winner

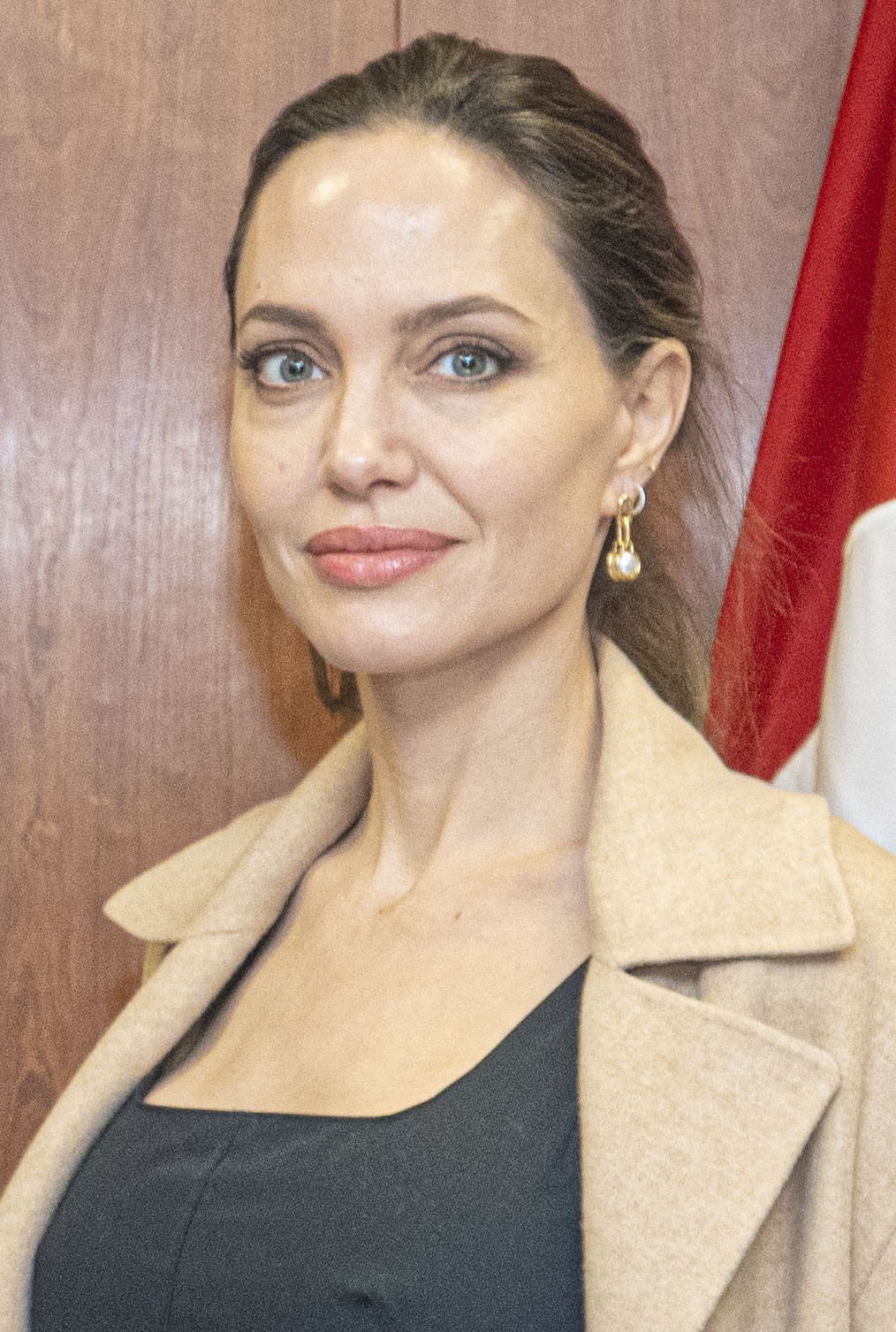
Angelina Jolie, Best Supporting Actress winner

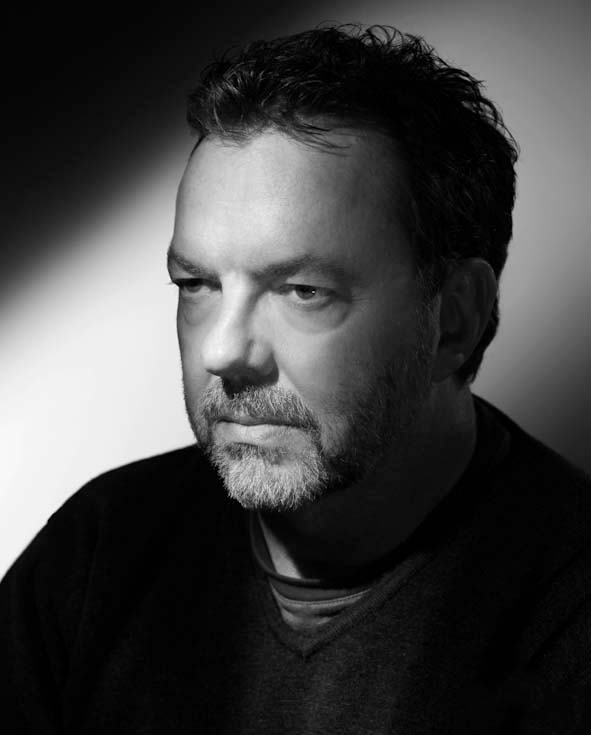
Alan Ball, Best Screenplay Written Directly for the Screen winner

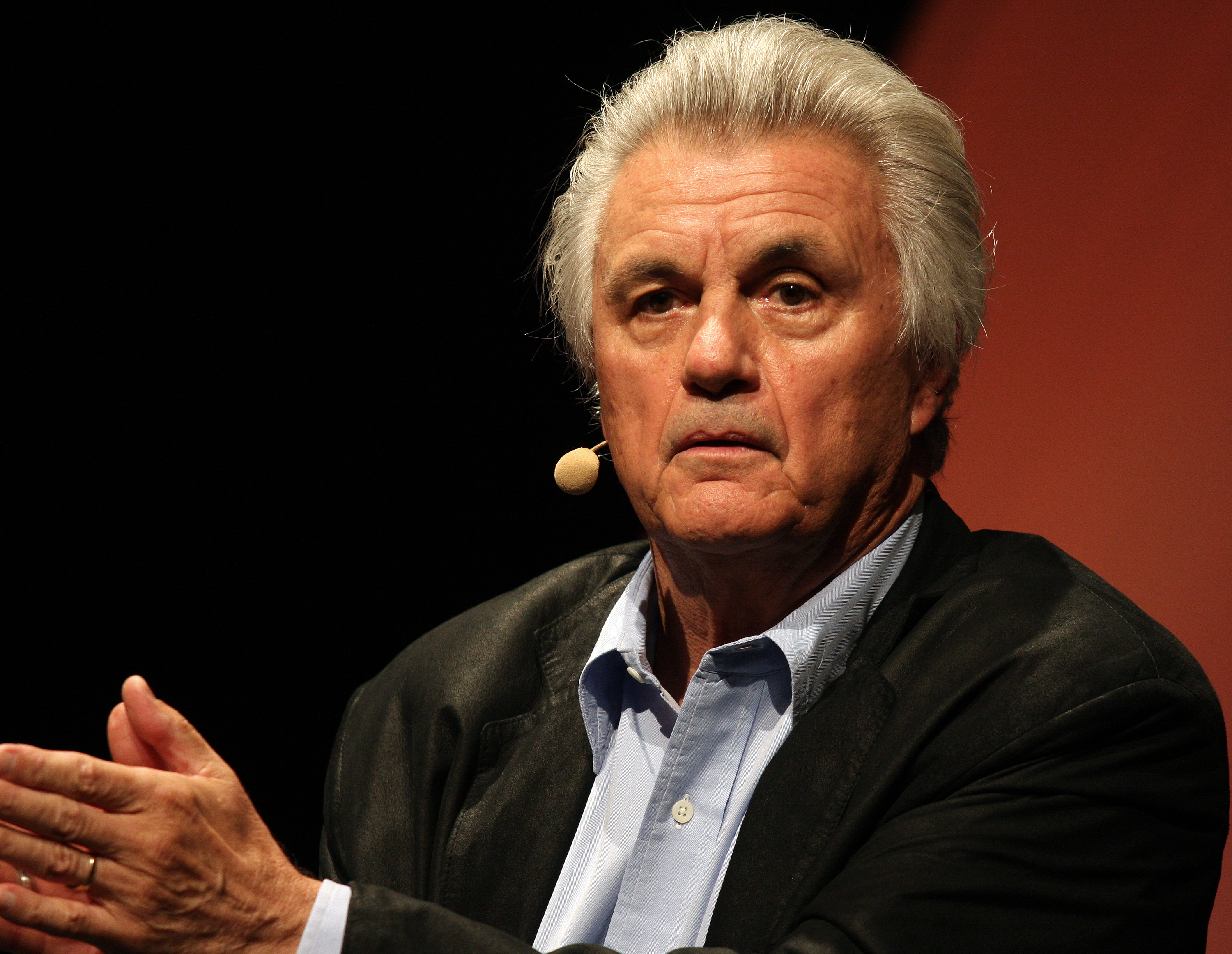
John Irving, Best Screenplay Based on Material Previously Produced or Published winner

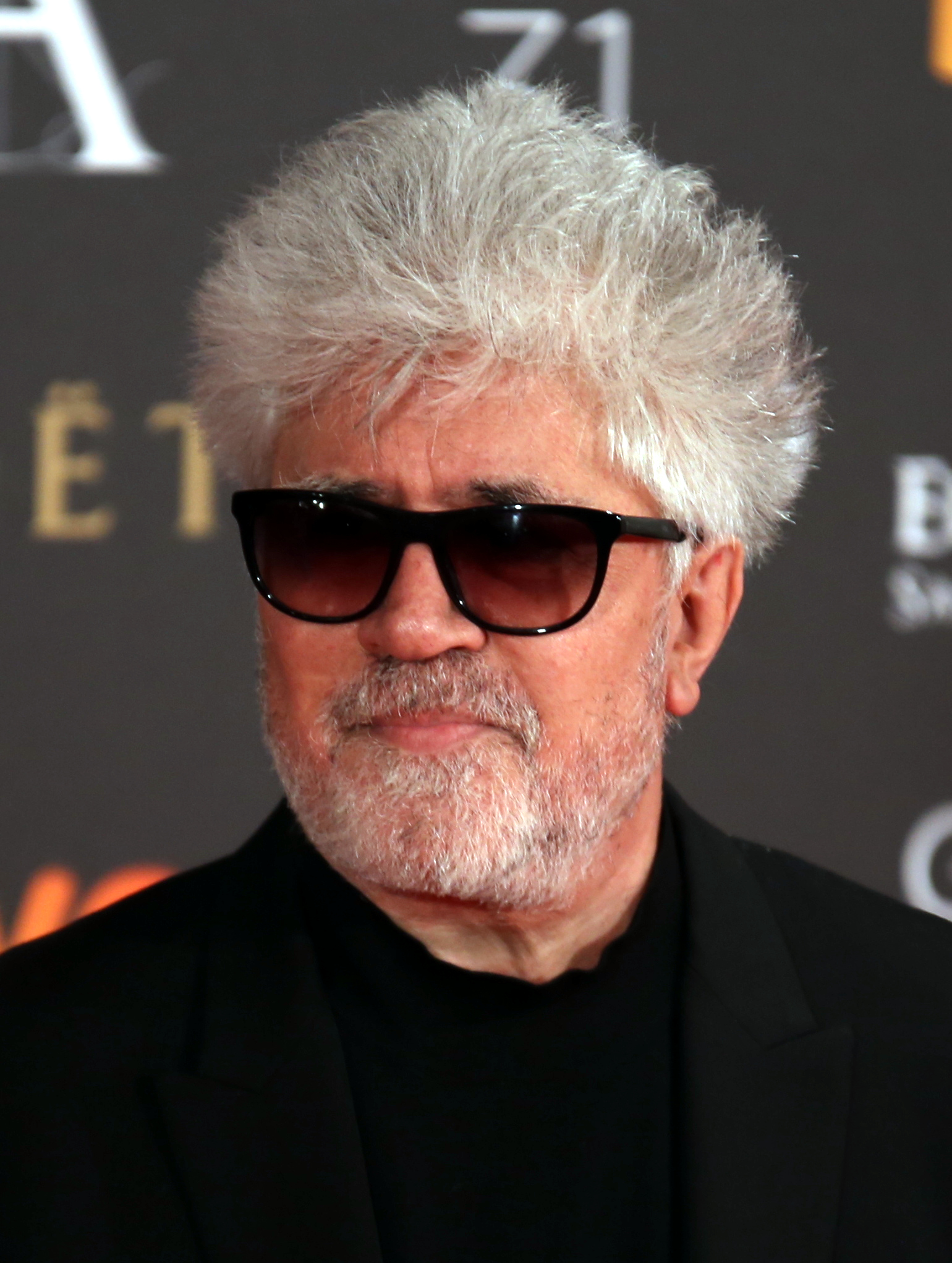
Pedro Almodóvar, Best Foreign Language Film winner

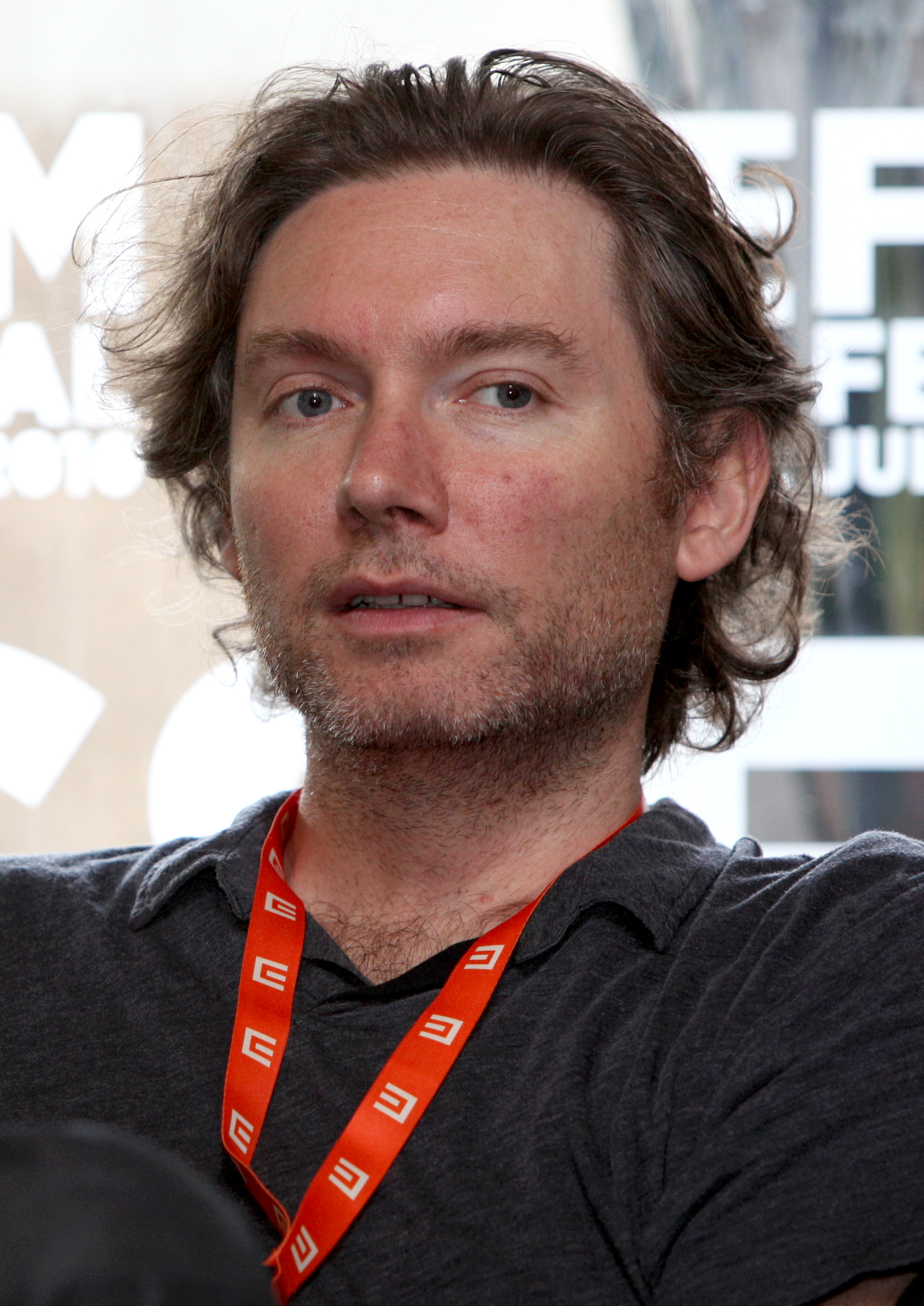
Kevin Macdonald, Best Documentary Feature co-winner

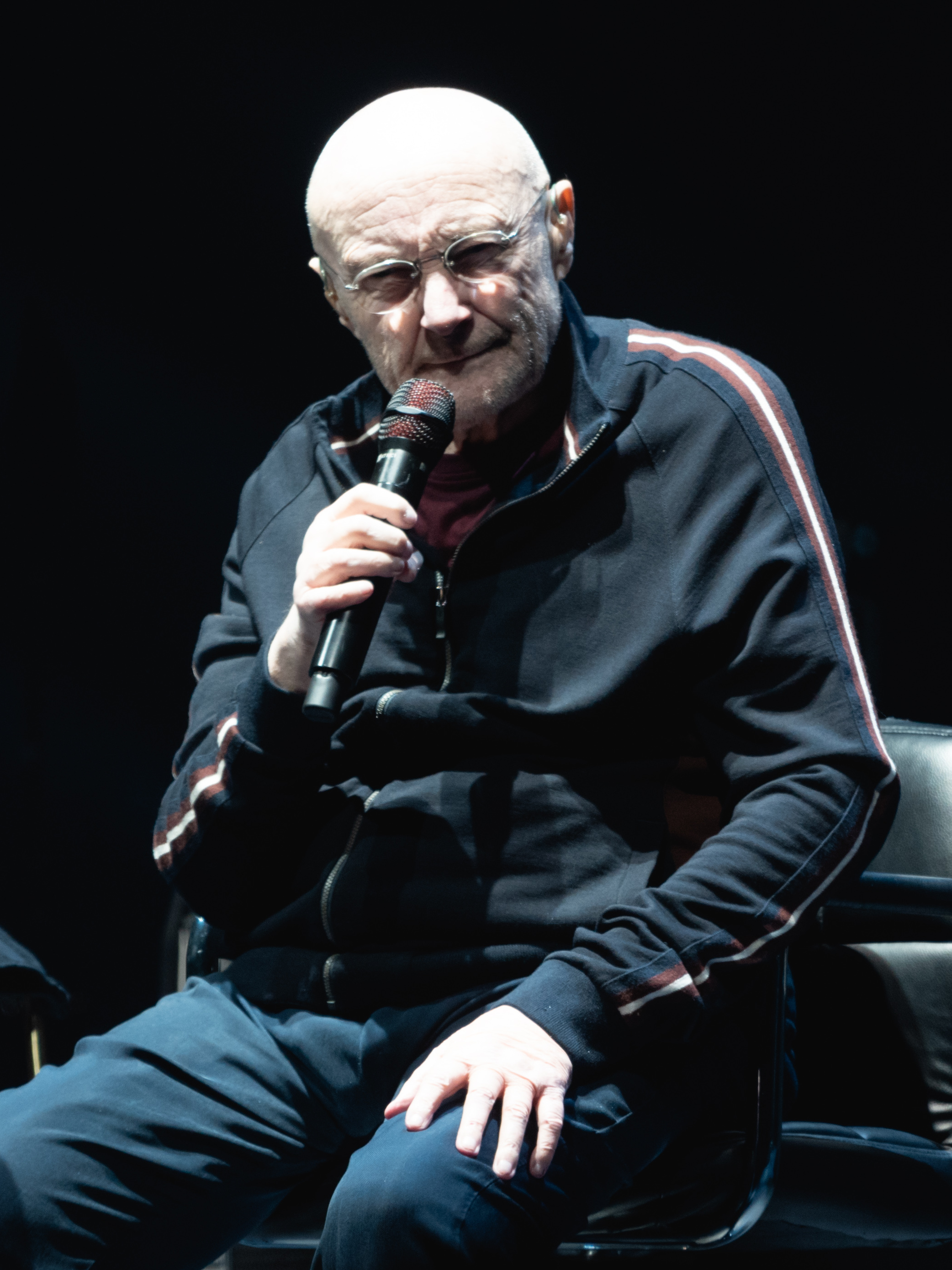
Phil Collins, Best Original Song winner

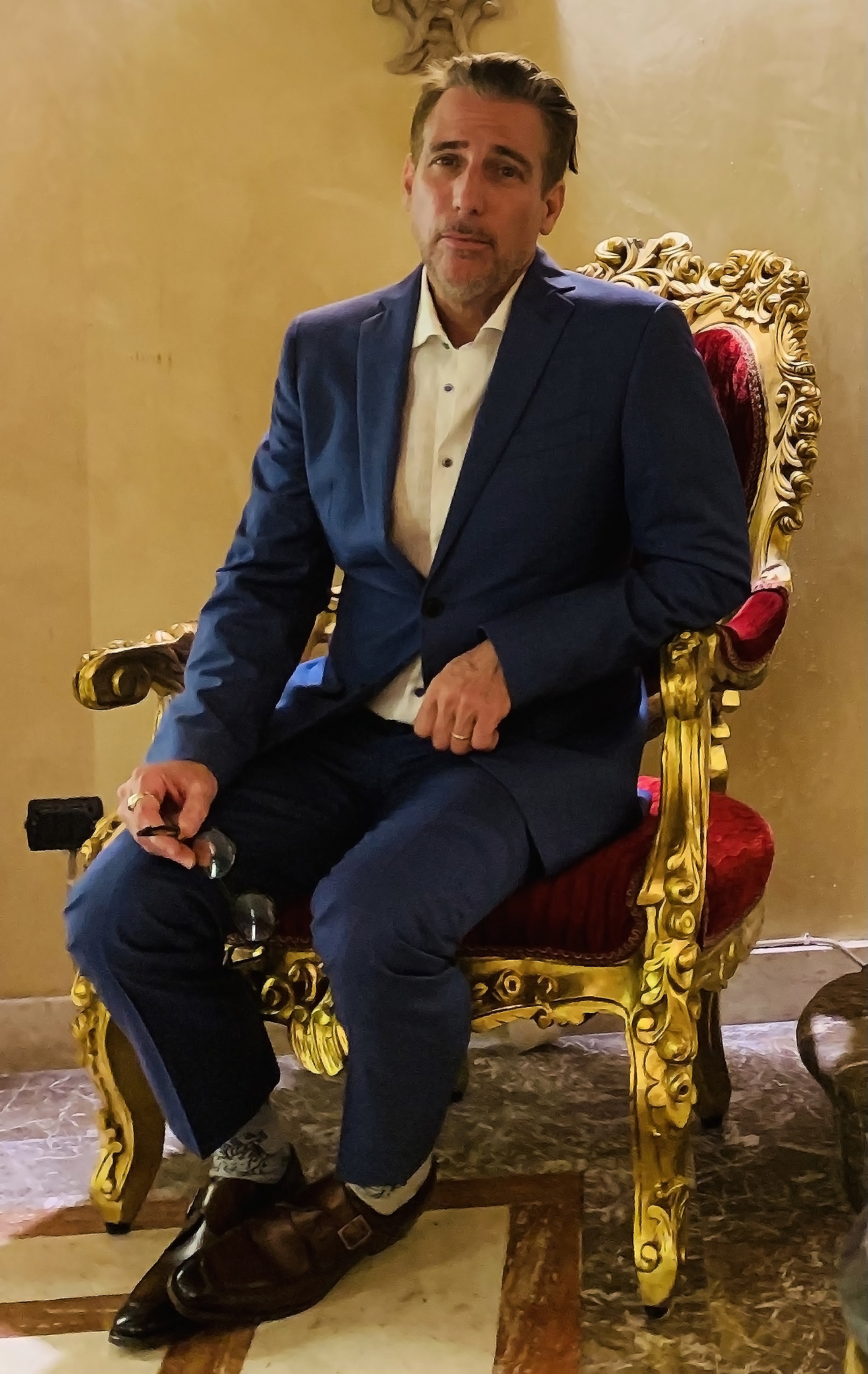
John Gaeta, Best Visual Effects co-winner

Winners are listed first, highlighted in boldface, and indicated with a double dagger (‡).

**Best Picture**: **American Beauty – Bruce Cohen and Dan Jinks, producers**‡; The Cider House Rules – Richard N. Gladstein, producer; The Green Mile – Frank Darabont and David Valdes, producers; The Insider – Pieter Jan Brugge and Michael Mann, producers; The Sixth Sense – Frank Marshall, Kathleen Kennedy, and Barry Mendel, producers	**Best Directing**: **Sam Mendes – American Beauty**‡; Lasse Hallström – The Cider House Rules; Spike Jonze – Being John Malkovich; Michael Mann – The Insider; M. Night Shyamalan – The Sixth Sense
**Best Actor in a Leading Role**: **Kevin Spacey – American Beauty as Lester Burnham**‡; Russell Crowe – The Insider as Jeffrey Wigand; Richard Farnsworth – The Straight Story as Alvin Straight; Sean Penn – Sweet and Lowdown as Emmet Ray; Denzel Washington – The Hurricane as Rubin Carter	**Best Actress in a Leading Role**: **Hilary Swank – Boys Don't Cry as Brandon Teena**‡; Annette Bening – American Beauty as Carolyn Burnham; Janet McTeer – Tumbleweeds as Mary Jo Walker; Julianne Moore – The End of the Affair as Sarah Miles; Meryl Streep – Music of the Heart as Roberta Guaspari
**Best Actor in a Supporting Role**: **Michael Caine – The Cider House Rules as Dr. Wilbur Larch**‡; Tom Cruise – Magnolia as Frank T.J. Mackey; Michael Clarke Duncan – The Green Mile as John Coffey; Jude Law – The Talented Mr. Ripley as Dickie Greenleaf; Haley Joel Osment – The Sixth Sense as Cole Sear	**Best Actress in a Supporting Role**: **Angelina Jolie – Girl, Interrupted as Lisa Rowe**‡; Toni Collette – The Sixth Sense as Lynn Sear; Catherine Keener – Being John Malkovich as Maxine Lund; Samantha Morton – Sweet and Lowdown as Hattie; Chloë Sevigny – Boys Don't Cry as Lana Tisdel
**Best Writing (Screenplay Written Directly for the Screen)**: **American Beauty – Alan Ball**‡; Being John Malkovich – Charlie Kaufman; Magnolia – Paul Thomas Anderson; The Sixth Sense – M. Night Shyamalan; Topsy-Turvy – Mike Leigh	**Best Writing (Screenplay Based on Material Previously Produced or Published)**: **The Cider House Rules – John Irving based on his novel**‡; Election – Alexander Payne and Jim Taylor from the novel by Tom Perrotta; The Green Mile – Frank Darabont adapted from the novel by Stephen King; The Insider – Eric Roth and Michael Mann based on the Vanity Fair article "The Man Who Knew Too Much" by Marie Brenner; The Talented Mr. Ripley – Anthony Minghella adapted from the novel by Patricia Highsmith
**Best Foreign Language Film**: **All About My Mother (Spain) in Spanish – Pedro Almodóvar**‡; East/West (France) in French – Régis Wargnier; Himalaya: Caravan (Nepal) in Nepalese – Éric Valli; Solomon & Gaenor (United Kingdom) in Welsh – Paul Morrison; Under the Sun (Sweden) in Swedish – Colin Nutley	**Best Documentary (Feature)**: **One Day in September – Arthur Cohn and Kevin Macdonald**‡; Buena Vista Social Club – Wim Wenders and Ulrich Felsberg; Genghis Blues – Roko Belic and Adrian Belic; On the Ropes – Nanette Burstein and Brett Morgen; Speaking in Strings – Paola di Florio and Lilibet Foster
**Best Documentary (Short Subject)**: **King Gimp – Susan Hannah Hadary and William A. Whiteford**‡; Eyewitness – Bert Van Bork; The Wildest Show in the South: The Angola Prison Rodeo – Simeon Soffer and Jonathan Stack	**Best Short Film (Live Action)**: **My Mother Dreams the Satan's Disciples in New York – Barbara Schock and Tammy Tiehel**‡; Bror, Min Bror – Henrik Ruben Genz and Michael W. Horsten; Killing Joe – Mehdi Norowzian and Steve Wax; Kleingeld – Marc-Andreas Bochert and Gabriele Lins; Major and Minor Miracles – Marcus Olsson
**Best Short Film (Animated)**: **The Old Man and the Sea – Alexander Petrov**‡; 3 Misses – Paul Driessen; Humdrum – Peter Peake; My Grandmother Ironed the King's Shirts – Torill Kove; When the Day Breaks – Wendy Tilby and Amanda Forbis	**Best Music (Original Score)**: **The Red Violin – John Corigliano**‡; American Beauty – Thomas Newman; Angela's Ashes – John Williams; The Cider House Rules – Rachel Portman; The Talented Mr. Ripley – Gabriel Yared
**Best Music (Original Song)**: **"You'll Be in My Heart" from Tarzan – Music and Lyrics by Phil Collins**‡; "Blame Canada" from South Park: Bigger, Longer & Uncut – Music and Lyrics by Trey Parker and Marc Shaiman; "Music of My Heart" from Music of the Heart – Music and Lyrics by Diane Warren; "Save Me" from Magnolia – Music and Lyrics by Aimee Mann; "When She Loved Me" from Toy Story 2 – Music and Lyrics by Randy Newman	**Best Sound**: **The Matrix – John T. Reitz, Gregg Rudloff, David E. Campbell and David Lee**‡; The Green Mile – Robert J. Litt, Elliot Tyson, Michael Herbick and Willie D. Burton; The Insider – Andy Nelson, Doug Hemphill and Lee Orloff; The Mummy – Leslie Shatz, Chris Carpenter, Rick Kline and Chris Munro; Star Wars: Episode I – The Phantom Menace – Gary Rydstrom, Tom Johnson, Shawn Murphy and John Midgley
**Best Sound Effects Editing**: **The Matrix – Dane Davis**‡; Fight Club – Ren Klyce and Richard Hymns; Star Wars: Episode I – The Phantom Menace – Ben Burtt and Tom Bellfort	**Best Art Direction**: **Sleepy Hollow – Art Direction: Rick Heinrichs; Set Decoration: Peter Young**‡; Anna and the King – Art Direction: Luciana Arrighi; Set Decoration: Ian Whittaker; The Cider House Rules – Art Direction: David Gropman; Set Decoration: Beth Rubino; The Talented Mr. Ripley – Art Direction: Roy Walker; Set Decoration: Bruno Cesari; Topsy-Turvy – Art Direction: Eve Stewart; Set Decoration: Eve Stewart and John Bush
**Best Cinematography**: **American Beauty – Conrad Hall**‡; The End of the Affair – Roger Pratt; The Insider – Dante Spinotti; Sleepy Hollow – Emmanuel Lubezki; Snow Falling on Cedars – Robert Richardson	**Best Makeup**: **Topsy-Turvy – Christine Blundell and Trefor Proud**‡; Austin Powers: The Spy Who Shagged Me – Michèle Burke and Mike Smithson; Bicentennial Man – Greg Cannom; Life – Rick Baker
**Best Costume Design**: **Topsy-Turvy – Lindy Hemming**‡; Anna and the King – Jenny Beavan; Sleepy Hollow – Colleen Atwood; The Talented Mr. Ripley – Ann Roth and Gary Jones; Titus – Milena Canonero	**Best Film Editing**: **The Matrix – Zach Staenberg**‡; American Beauty – Tariq Anwar and Christopher Greenbury; The Cider House Rules – Lisa Zeno Churgin; The Insider – William Goldenberg, Paul Rubell and David Rosenbloom; The Sixth Sense – Andrew Mondshein
**Best Visual Effects**: **The Matrix – John Gaeta, Janek Sirrs, Steve Courtley and Jon Thum**‡; Star Wars: Episode I – The Phantom Menace – John Knoll, Dennis Muren, Scott Squires and Rob Coleman; Stuart Little – John Dykstra, Jerome Chen, Henry F. Anderson III and Eric Allard

=== Honorary Award ===
- To Andrzej Wajda in recognition of five decades of extraordinary film direction.

=== Irving G. Thalberg Memorial Award ===
- Warren Beatty

=== Films with multiple nominations and awards ===
The following 17 films received multiple nominations:

Nominations	Film
8	American Beauty
7	The Cider House Rules
7	The Insider
6	The Sixth Sense
5	The Talented Mr. Ripley
4	The Green Mile
4	The Matrix
4	Topsy-Turvy
3	Being John Malkovich
3	Magnolia
3	Sleepy Hollow
3	Star Wars: Episode I – The Phantom Menace
2	Anna and the King
2	Boys Don't Cry
2	The End of the Affair
2	Music of the Heart
2	Sweet and Lowdown

The following four films received multiple awards:

Awards	Film
5	American Beauty
4	The Matrix
2	The Cider House Rules
2	Topsy-Turvy

== Presenters and performers ==
The following individuals presented awards or performed musical numbers.

=== Presenters (in order of appearance) ===
Name(s)	Role
Peter Coyote	Announcer for the 72nd annual Academy Awards
Robert Rehme (AMPAS president)	Gave opening remarks welcoming guests to the awards ceremony
Drew Barrymore; Cameron Diaz; Lucy Liu	Presenters of the award for Best Costume Design
Haley Joel Osment	Presenter of the child actors tribute montage
Heather Graham; Mike Myers	Presenters of the award for Best Sound
Erykah Badu; Tobey Maguire	Presenters of the award for Best Makeup
Winona Ryder	Presenter of the film The Cider House Rules on the Best Picture segment
James Coburn	Presenter of the award for Best Supporting Actress
Morgan Freeman	Presenter of the "200 Million Year History" movie segment
Cate Blanchett; Jude Law	Presenters of the award for Best Live Action Short Film
Sheriff Woody; Buzz Lightyear; Jessie; Rock 'Em Sock 'Em Robots	Presentation of the award for Best Animated Short Film
Samuel L. Jackson	Presenter of the film The Green Mile on the Best Picture segment
LL Cool J Vanessa Williams	Introducers of the performances of the Best Original Song nominees
Cher	Presenter of the award for Best Original Song
Wes Bentley; Thora Birch; Mena Suvari	Presenters of the award Best Documentary Short Subject
Ethan Hawke; Uma Thurman	Presenters of the award for Best Documentary Feature
Judi Dench	Presenter of the award for Best Supporting Actor
Jane Fonda	Presenter of the Honorary Academy Award to Andrzej Wajda
Chow Yun-fat	Presenter of the award Best Sound Effects Editing
Salma Hayek	Presenter of the segment of the Academy Awards for Technical Achievement and the Gordon E. Sawyer Award
Arnold Schwarzenegger	Presenter of the award for Best Visual Effects
Diane Keaton	Presenter of the film American Beauty on the Best Picture segment
Angela Bassett	Presenter of the film The Sixth Sense on Best Picture segment
Antonio Banderas; Penélope Cruz	Presenters of the award for Best Foreign Language Film
Keanu Reeves; Charlize Theron	Presenters of the award for Best Original Score
Edward Norton	Presenter of the "In Memoriam" tribute
Russell Crowe; Julianne Moore	Presenters of the award for Best Art Direction
Tommy Lee Jones; Ashley Judd	Presenters of the award for Best Film Editing
Jack Nicholson	Presenter of the Irving G. Thalberg Memorial Award to Warren Beatty
Brad Pitt	Presenter for the award for Best Cinematography
Kevin Spacey	Presenter of the award for Best Screenplay Based on Material Previously Produced or Published
Mel Gibson	Presenter of the award for Best Screenplay Written Directly for the Screen/Original Screenplay
Anjelica Huston	Presenter of the film The Insider on the Best Picture segment
Roberto Benigni	Presenter of the award for Best Actress
Gwyneth Paltrow	Presenter of the award for Best Actor
Steven Spielberg	Presenter of the award for Best Director
Clint Eastwood	Presenter of the award for Best Picture

=== Performers (in order of appearance) ===
Name(s)	Role	Performed
Burt Bacharach; Rob Shrock; Don Was	Musical Arrangers	Orchestral
Billy Crystal	Performer	Opening number: The Green Mile (to the tune of "Green Acres theme song"), The Sixth Sense (to the tune of "People" from Funny Girl), The Insider (to the tune of Minute Waltz by Frédéric Chopin), The Cider House Rules (to the tune of "Mame" from Mame), and American Beauty (to the tune of "The Lady Is a Tramp" from Babes in Arms)
Sarah McLachlan; Randy Newman	Performers	"When She Loved Me" from Toy Story 2
Aimee Mann	Performer	"Save Me" from Magnolia
Phil Collins	Performer	"You'll Be in My Heart" from Tarzan
Gloria Estefan 'N Sync	Performers	"Music of My Heart" from Music of the Heart
Robin Williams	Performer	"Blame Canada" from South Park: Bigger, Longer, and Uncut
Garth Brooks; Faith Hill; Ray Charles; Queen Latifah; Isaac Hayes; Burt Bacharach; Dionne Warwick	Performers	"Everybody's Talkin'" from Midnight Cowboy, "Over the Rainbow" from The Wizard of Oz, "Secret Love" from Calamity Jane, "The Man That Got Away" from A Star Is Born, "I've Got You Under My Skin" from Born to Dance, "All the Way" from The Joker Is Wild, "Raindrops Keep Fallin' on My Head" from Butch Cassidy and the Sundance Kid, "Theme from Shaft" from Shaft, "The Way We Were" from The Way We Were, "When You Wish Upon a Star" from Pinocchio, and "Alfie" from Alfie

== Ceremony information ==
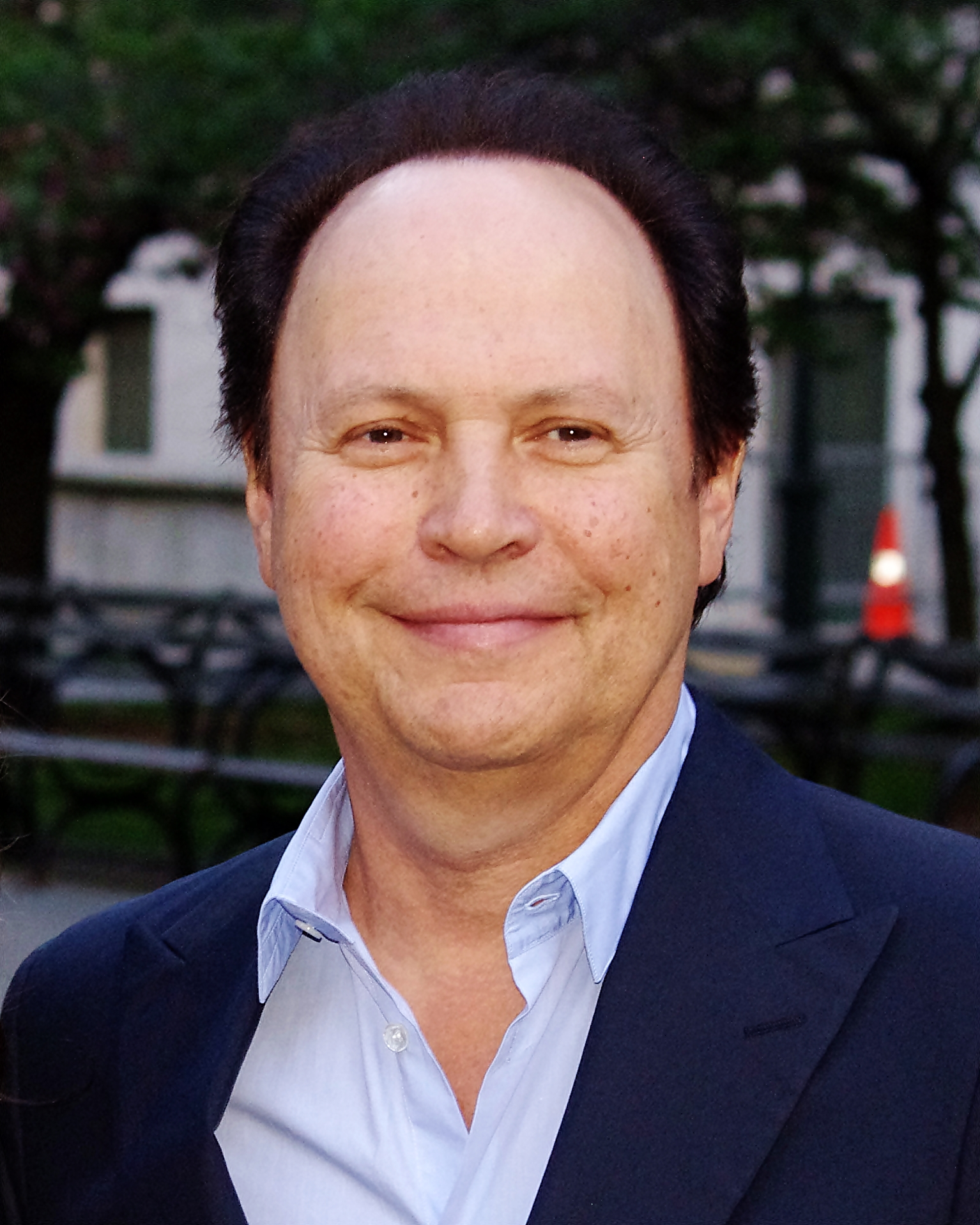
Billy Crystal hosted the 72nd Academy Awards.

In view of the new millennium, the academy sought to both shorten the telecast and give the ceremony a new look. Husband–and–wife producers Richard D. Zanuck and Lili Fini Zanuck were recruited to oversee the production of the 2000 ceremony. AMPAS President Robert Rehme explained the decision to hire the Zanucks saying, "With this new producing team in place, I look forward to a whole new perspective." This marked the first occurrence that a woman was tapped for producing duties at the Oscars. Despite Richard and Lili's promises to make changes to the ceremony, they hired actor and veteran Oscar host Billy Crystal to host the ceremony for the seventh time.

Production of the ceremony was reported to be far more ambitious and extravagant than previous ceremonies. Art director Bob Keene designed an ambitiously technological stage design for the telecast that used a floor adorned with flashing lights and several 35 foot columns consisting of high-definition video monitors stacked atop each other. The columns were used to display images of previous Oscar appearances as presenters took the stage, nomination packages, and reaction shots of the acting nominees as the winner was being announced. Because of serious technical challenges concerning movement, lighting, and overheating, Keene and his production design team tested the stage at ABC Prospect Studios before installing it at the Shrine Auditorium.

Several other people were involved in the production of the ceremony. Actor Peter Coyote, who served as announcer for the telecast, was often seen before commercial breaks live behind the stage. Musical directors Burt Bacharach, Don Was, and Rob Shrock composed a techno-pop soundtrack that substituted for a live orchestra during most of the ceremony. In addition, Bacharach rounded up musicians that included Garth Brooks, Queen Latifah, and Dionne Warwick to perform a medley of songs previously nominated for Best Original Song. Choreographer Kenny Ortega supervised the "Blame Canada" musical number. Whitney Houston was announced as one of performers, but two days before the ceremony she was fired by Bacharach due to being unprepared and unresponsive to direction; Faith Hill filled in for her.

=== Box office performance of nominees ===
At the time of the nominations announcement on February 15, the combined gross of the five Best Picture nominees was $521 million with an average of $104 million per film. The Sixth Sense was the highest earner among the Best Picture nominees with $278.4 million in domestic box office receipts. The film was followed by The Green Mile ($120.7 million), American Beauty ($74.7 million), The Cider House Rules ($20.7 million), and finally The Insider ($26.6 million).

Of the top 50 grossing movies of the year, 37 nominations went to 11 films on the list. Only The Sixth Sense (2nd), The Green Mile (13th), The Talented Mr. Ripley (26th), and American Beauty (27th) were nominated for directing, acting, screenwriting, or Best Picture. The other top 50 box office hits that earned the nominations were Star Wars Episode I: The Phantom Menace (1st), Toy Story 2 (3rd), The Matrix (5th), Tarzan (6th), The Mummy (8th), Stuart Little (11th), and Sleepy Hollow (20th).

=== Missing paper ballots ===
Nearly two weeks before Oscar voting was finished, AMPAS reported that 4,000 of the ballots mailed to Academy members were missing. The bags that carried the ballots were mislabeled as third-class mail. On March 6, 2000, 1,000 of the ballots were discovered at a US Postal Service regional distribution center in Bell, California. In response to affected members, AMPAS sent replacement ballots sealed in yellow envelopes, and extended the voting deadline by two days to March 23.

=== Oscar statuettes theft ===
On March 10, 2000, 55 Oscar statuettes were stolen from a Roadway Express loading dock in Bell, California. In the event the stolen awards were to be still missing during the festivities, AMPAS announced that R.S. Owens & Company, the manufacturer of the awards would produce a new batch of the golden statuettes. Nine days later, 52 of the stolen statuettes were discovered in a trash bin at a Food 4 Less supermarket located in the Koreatown neighborhood of Los Angeles by a man named Willie Fulgear. For the safe recovery of the stolen statuettes, Roadway Express rewarded Fulgear with $50,000, and the academy invited him and his son Allen to the ceremony. Two Roadway Express employees, truck driver Lawrence Ledent and dock worker Anthony Hart, were arrested for the theft of the Oscars. Both men pleaded no contest. Ledent served six months in prison and Hart received probation. A third man who was Mr. Fulgear's half-brother was initially charged with the crime, but police dropped those charges after Mr. Fulgear divulged that they were estranged from each other. Three years later, one of three remaining missing Oscar statuettes was discovered during a drug bust at a mansion in Miami, Florida; the other two have yet to be found.

=== Critical reviews ===
The show received a positive reception from most media publications. Television critic Monica Collins of the Boston Herald praised producers Richard and Lili Fini Zanuck for overseeing a show that was "clean, snappy, high-gloss and very well produced." She also quipped that host Billy Crystal did not need to save the show this time because "everything seemed to come together." The San Francisco Examiner's Wesley Morris wrote "the show was downright hip, more so than it's been in decades." He also gave high marks for the "techno-chic" production elements from the music and stage design. Columnist Paul Brownfield of the Los Angeles Times raved that "the 72nd annual Academy Awards telecast was hipper than in years past, sleeker in look and edgier in tone." He added that Crystal was "the perfect antidote to the entire evening's self-serious posturing."

Some media outlets were more critical of the show. John Carman of the San Francisco Chronicle lamented that despite being solid and tidy, "the show never quite managed the big surprises, sloppy excesses and emotional highs we hope to see." Pittsburgh Post-Gazette television critic Rob Owen criticized the uneven pacing of the ceremony writing that the telecast "started slowly – 20 minutes of Billy Crystal's spoofs and singing that weren't as funny as his past Oscar intros – and never got up to speed." Caryn James of The New York Times remarked that "the four-hour show turned into a zombie." She also stated that the telecast was bloated with too many tributes to Hollywood's past.

=== Ratings and reception ===
The American telecast on ABC drew in an average of 46.52 million viewers over its length, which was a 3% increase from the previous year's ceremony. An estimated 79.11 million total viewers watched all or part of the awards. The show also drew higher Nielsen ratings compared to the previous ceremony with 29.64% of households watching over a 48.32 share. It also drew a higher 18–49 demo rating with a 19.86 rating over a 39.34 share among viewers in that demographic.

In July 2000, the show received nine nominations at the 52nd Primetime Emmy Awards. Two months later, the ceremony won one of those nominations for Louis J. Horvitz's direction of the telecast.

== "In Memoriam" ==
The annual "In Memoriam" tribute, presented by actor Edward Norton, honored the following people.

- Sylvia Sidney – actress
- Jim Varney – actor
- Ernest Gold – composer
- Ruth Roman – actress
- Henry Jones – actor
- Robert Bresson – director
- Desmond Llewelyn – actor
- Allan Carr – producer
- Mario Puzo – screenwriter
- Rory Calhoun – actor
- Frank Tarloff – screenwriter
- Marc Davis – animator
- Hedy Lamarr – actress
- Victor Mature – actor
- Garson Kanin – screenwriter
- Roger Vadim – producer, director
- Mabel King – actress
- Oliver Reed – actor
- Albert Whitlock – special effects
- Ian Bannen – actor
- Abraham Polonsky – screenwriter
- Dirk Bogarde – actor
- Lila Kedrova – actress
- Edward Dmytryk – director
- Charles "Buddy" Rogers – actor, musician
- Madeline Kahn – actress
- George C. Scott – actor

== See also ==
- 6th Screen Actors Guild Awards
- 20th Golden Raspberry Awards
- 42nd Grammy Awards
- 52nd Primetime Emmy Awards
- 53rd British Academy Film Awards
- 54th Tony Awards
- 57th Golden Globe Awards
- List of submissions to the 72nd Academy Awards for Best Foreign Language Film

== Bibliography ==
- Bona, Damien (2002), Inside Oscar 2, New York, United States: Ballantine Books, ISBN 0-345-44970-3
- Levy, Emanuel (2003), All About Oscar: The History and Politics of the Academy Awards, New York, United States: Continuum International Publishing Group, ISBN 0-8264-1452-4
- Pond, Steve (2005), The Big Show: High Times and Dirty Dealings Backstage at the Academy Awards, New York, United States: Faber and Faber, ISBN 0-571-21193-3
