= The Farm: Angola, USA =

1998 American documentary film

- Directed by: Liz Garbus; Wilbert Rideau; Jonathan Stack
- Written by: Bob Harris
- Produced by: Liz Garbus; Jonathan Stack
- Narrated by: Bernard Addison
- Cinematography: Sam Henriques; Bob Perrin
- Edited by: Mona Davis; Mary Manhardt
- Distributed by: Seventh Art Releasing
- Release date: 1998
- Running time: 88 minutes
- Country: United States
- Language: English

The Farm: Angola, USA is a 1998 documentary film set in the notorious and largest American maximum-security prison, Louisiana State Penitentiary, known as Angola. Loosely based on articles published in Life Sentences, drawn from the prison magazine, The Angolite, the film was directed and produced by Jonathan Stack and Liz Garbus. Wilbert Rideau, a life prisoner (now released) who had been editor of the magazine since 1975, also participated in direction and was credited on the film.

The film follows the lives of seven prison inmates, including Rideau, who tell their own stories of life, death, and survival in a world that few manage to leave. It was filmed during the early years of the long tenure of Warden Burl Cain (1995–2016), who is credited with reducing violence at the prison and establishing many programs to support rehabilitation of the men.

The film was nominated for an Academy Award for Best Documentary Feature. It won the Sundance Film Festival Grand Jury prize, and both the New York and the Los Angeles Film Critics awards for Best Documentary of ‘98. After airing on A&E, it won an Emmy Award.

Years later, Stack followed up with the documentary The Farm: 10 Down (2009), exploring the lives of the survivors of this group 10 years later. One man had been executed and one had died during the making of the first film. Ten years later, three men had gained freedom; two of the first six remained in prison.

Inmates profiled
Inmate	Year imprisoned	Sentence	Conviction	Status
John A. Brown Jr.	1984	Death	First degree murder and robbery	Executed in 1997
George Crawford	1994	Life	First degree murder	
Wilbert Rideau	1961	Death (commuted to life in 1972)	First degree murder and kidnapping	Released in 2005 after his conviction was reduced to manslaughter in his 4th trial
Vincent Simmons	1977	100 years	Two counts of attempted aggravated rape	Released in 2022 after his conviction was overturned
Eugene "Bishop" Tanniehill	1956	Life	Second degree murder and armed robbery	Released by Gov. Kathleen Blanco in August 2007
Logan "Bones" Theriot	1987	Life	Murder of wife	Died in prison of lung cancer in 1997
Ashanti Witherspoon	1972	75 years	Armed robbery	Paroled in 1999

== Reception ==
On review aggregator website Rotten Tomatoes, the film holds an approval rating of 100% based on 6 reviews, with an average rating of 6.7/10.

== Awards ==
- Sundance Film Festival – Grand Jury Prize, 1998
- Academy Awards – Best Documentary Feature: Nominee, 1999
- Doubletake Documentary Film Festival – Audience Award, 1998
- Emmy Awards – 1999
  - Outstanding Achievement in Non-Fiction Programming – Cinematography
  - Outstanding Achievement in Non-Fiction Programming – Picture Editing
  - Outstanding Achievement in Non-Fiction Programming – Sound Editing: Nominee
  - Outstanding Non-Fiction Special: Nominee
- Santa Barbara International Film Festival – Best Documentary, 2000
- Florida Film Festival – Grand Jury Prize, 1998
- San Francisco Film Festival – Golden Gate Award, 1998
- New York Film Critics Circle – Best Non-Fiction Film, 1998
- National Society of Film Critics – Best Non-Fiction Film, 1999
- Los Angeles Film Critics Association – Best Documentary Film, 1999
- Taos Talking Pictures Film Festival – Taos Land Grant Award: Nominee, 1998
- Thurgood Marshall Award, 1999
- Satellite Awards – Best Documentary: Nominee – 1998
