= Vincent Simmons =

American prisoner

Vincent Alfred Simmons (born February 17, 1952) is an American man who was wrongly imprisoned at Angola State Prison in Louisiana, where he was sentenced to 100 years in July 1977 after being convicted of the "attempted aggravated rapes" of 14-year-old twin sisters Karen and Sharon Sanders of Marksville. Simmons has maintained his innocence throughout. By 1999 Simmons had filed numerous habeas corpus writs, but had not gained an evidentiary hearing by a Louisiana court. After receiving a copy of his evidence file in 1993, he had found that it contained exculpatory evidence that was not given to his court-appointed attorney by the District Attorney, and that there were inconsistencies in reports and statements of victims and witnesses.

Simmons is one of six subjects of the documentary The Farm: Life In Angola Prison (1998) (shown on HBO). He is the sole subject of a follow-up documentary Shadows of Doubt: Vincent Simmons (1999), which explored his case, its weaknesses, and his severe sentence. He is one of the subjects of The Farm: 10 Down (2009), which returned 10 years later to the survivors among the six men featured in the 1998 film.

== Background ==
Vincent Alfred Simmons is an African-American man from Mansura, a small town in Avoyelles Parish, Louisiana. He is the son of Alzica and James Simmons, and has several siblings, including younger sisters Della and Olivia, and brother Philip "Bear" Simmons. He has said he got on the wrong side of the law, and committed infractions when young which resulted in his being sentenced to juvenile facilities. Later he was arrested but not convicted of burglary. He left Avoyelles Parish for several years, living in Texas. People warned him not to return to Louisiana, where he had attracted the attention of local parish police. A week after his return, he was arrested as a suspect in the rape of two white minor girls. He maintains that he is innocent of that crime.

== 1977 events ==
On May 22, 1977, Karen and Sharon Sanders of Marksville, Avoyelles Parish, 14-year-old white twins, reported to family that they had been raped by a black man two weeks before, on May 9. In statements to police, the twins claimed that they, along with their 18-year-old cousin Keith Laborde (revealed to have been 20 at the time), had encountered a black man at a 7-Eleven in Marksville. They gave him a ride, and he produced a knife and forced all three to get into the trunk of the car. After driving to an isolated location, he took out each twin and raped her separately, then returned the three to town and set them free at the cemetery. The twins said that their attacker threatened to have his buddies come after them if they told anyone. At the time of their statements to the police, the twins did not describe or identify their attacker, saying that "all blacks looks alike."

Avoyelles Parish Police picked up Vincent Simmons the next day on May 23 in Marksville, where he was walking. He had been back about a week after spending several years in Texas. At the police station, they placed him in a line-up of seven men, including one white man. Simmons was positioned in the center of the group and was the only man who was handcuffed. Three police officers do not agree among themselves as to whether Simmons was in handcuffs in the lineup, or photographed in handcuffs with the group at a different time. From that group, the Sanders twins and Laborde all identified Simmons as their attacker.

Simmons was taken into an interrogation room. According to him, when he refused to make a statement about the purported crimes, he was manhandled by one of the officers, while still handcuffed, pushed down, and kicked while on the floor. He struggled to his feet and was shot in the chest by deputy Robert LaBorde. He later came to in the hospital, and was taken back to the police station after some treatment.

The police version of events is that Simmons, still in handcuffs, disarmed Officer Melvin Villamarette and tried to fire at LaBorde, but was unable to release the safety. Simmons allegedly shouted, "You will never take me alive," before LaBorde shot him in the chest, inches from his heart. Simmons was never charged for this alleged attack.

Prosecutor Eddie Knoll gained an indictment against Simmons from the parish grand jury on two counts of aggravated rape.

== Contemporary legal environment ==
The United States Supreme Court in Furman v. Georgia (1972) had ruled that states' laws on implementing the death penalty were so arbitrary in application as to be unconstitutional and ordered them to be rewritten. Executions of persons on death rows were suspended and the respective state courts were ordered to amend their sentences to the next lower level of severity, generally life imprisonment. The sentences of more than 600 persons on death row were commuted to life; 587 of these individuals were men.

In the years following, the Louisiana legislature rewrote its death penalty statute. Among the crimes for which it imposed capital punishment was aggravated rape. The United States Supreme Court ruled in Selman v. Louisiana, 428 U.S. 906, 96 S. Ct. 3214, 49 L. Ed. 2d 1212 (1976), that "the imposition and enforcement of the death penalty in aggravated rape cases under the statute at issue ... constituted cruel and unusual punishment in violation of the Eighth and Fourteenth Amendments." (By 1977 only three states imposed the death penalty for rape.)

In Coker v. Georgia (decided June 29, 1977), the US Supreme Court overturned any use of capital punishment as the penalty for rape, ruling that it was "cruel and unusual punishment" under the 8th Amendment to the Constitution. By order of the court, inmates on Death Row for aggravated rape were to have their sentences judicially amended to the next level of severity; in Louisiana, convicted rapists on Death Row had their sentences commuted to a maximum of 20 years in prison. This ruling was made before Simmons' case was tried.

In 1977 the Louisiana legislature amended the death penalty statute, C.Cr.P. 933. R.S. 14:42, by Act 343 of 1977. This law "took effect on September 9, 1977 and provided a new penalty, one other than death." It established a penalty of life for the crime of aggravated rape and imposed a 50-year sentence on those convicted of attempted aggravated rape.

== The case ==
Simmons was tried before a jury of eleven white men and one black woman in July 1977, with counsel by a court-appointed attorney. One of the assistant DAs was Knoll's wife, Jeannette Knoll. She was elected in 1982 as a state circuit court judge, and in 1996 to the State Supreme Court, from which she retired in 2016.

Days before the Simmons trial, DA Eddie Knoll amended the charges against the defendant to "attempted aggravated rape." Simmons had not been indicted on these charges. Knoll did not explain to the jury why Simmons was being charged with two counts of "attempted aggravated rape", when the testimony they were hearing was based upon justifying the charges of two counts of aggravated rape.

No physical evidence from the car was presented in the Simmons case to tie him to the alleged rapes. No physical evidence was presented to prove that the rapes had occurred. The case was based on testimony by the Sanders' twins and LaBorde. Simmons' defense presented several alibi eyewitnesses who said that Simmons was with them at a local bar the night of the rapes. Knoll attacked the credibility of these witnesses in front of the jury, suggesting that prior minor crimes of the witnesses, such as littering, parking fines, and disturbing the peace, should affect their credibility.

Defense attorney Brouillette never questioned the state's witnesses regarding their statements. He failed to note the numerous discrepancies between the twins' and their cousin's police interviews, preliminary examinations, and testimony at trial. For example, when the twins and Keith Laborde gave their initial statements to the police, they said they did not know their attacker's identity and said that "all blacks look alike." They made no mention of a weapon. At trial, each claimed that they knew their attacker by name, saying that he had introduced himself to them as "Simmons" before his attack. The girls said that Simmons threatened them with a gun and knife. LaBorde was identified as being 18 in the police statements, but he was 20, married, and a member of the Marine Corps. During his closing statement, the prosecutor asked the jury to imagine themselves in the place of the victims of the crime. This is grounds for objection, but Brouillette failed to object.

Simmons was convicted of two counts of attempted aggravated rape (one for each twin), based on the testimony of the twins and LaBorde. He was sentenced to 50 years imprisonment on each count, for a total of 100 years.

== From Angola prison ==
Beginning in 1977, Simmons filed repeated legal motions to view the evidence file pertaining to his case, which included police reports, arrest reports, victims' statements, trial transcripts, the medical examiner's (coroner) report of his examination of the twins, and other documents.

He was not granted a copy of these documents until 1993. He learned that the doctor who examined the twins reported that Sharon Sanders' hymen was intact three weeks after the date of the alleged rape and that she was a virgin. According to the report, she told the doctor she was not sure if Simmons' penis had penetrated her. The doctor's report on her and her sister noted that neither had any bruises or signs of physical injury. In violation of the US Supreme Court's 1963 ruling on the prosecution being required to turn over exculpatory evidence to the defense, the prosecution had suppressed these medical examiner's reports during discovery. Simmons' court-appointed attorney, Harold Brouillette, apparently had made no effort to attain them.

These facts alone might have presented "reasonable doubt" to the jury about the facts of the case. Simmons claims that he is legally entitled to an evidentiary hearing under Brady v. Maryland (1963). In this case the United States Supreme Court held that the prosecution must turn over all evidence that might exonerate the defendant (exculpatory evidence) to the defense.

== Later events ==
On Monday, February 14, 2022, Avoyelles Parish Judge William Bennett granted a new trial, a monumental legal feat. District Attorney Charlie Riddle dismissed the charges against Simmons with the consent of the women, Sharon and Karen Sanders.

According to court records, the original trial happened 60 days after the allegation and Simmons was convicted in one day.

== Representation in other media ==
Simmons has been featured in three documentaries, one that was focused primarily on him and his case. He is one of six inmate subjects of the documentary The Farm: Life In Angola Prison (1998) (broadcast on HBO and available on Netflix), which won an Emmy Award and numerous others, and was nominated for an Academy Award. It included a painful scene of Simmons' appeal to the parole board, which turned him down with little discussion, and outright dismissal of evidence with which he tried to show his innocence, including evidence records.

Jonathan Stack, one of the directors and producers of that film, returned to Angola and Avoyelles Parish to explore more about Simmons and his case. He hired a private investigator to talk with Simmons' family, as well as police officials, prosecutor Eddie Knoll (who served until 2003), one juror from the trial, witnesses, and people in the town and parish to understand more about Simmons' life. Two defense attorneys commented on the conduct of the trial and issues with the lack of exculpatory evidence given to the defense. (This was disputed by the prosecutor.) Stack arranged a meeting between Simmons and the Sanders twins who had accused him of rape 20 years before. Simmons is the sole subject of a follow-up documentary Shadows of Doubt: Vincent Simmons (1999), which is now available for viewing on YouTube.

In addition, Stack directed and produced The Farm: 10 Down (2009), about the surviving men of the six he had featured, 10 years later. Simmons is featured as one of the survivors and continues to maintain his innocence.
