= World Vasectomy Day =

Annual event to raise global awareness of vasectomy

World Vasectomy Day (WVD) is an annual event held on the third Friday in November to raise global awareness of vasectomy as a male-oriented solution to prevent unintended pregnancies. The goal is for doctors all over the world to perform vasectomies, connected to the event via Skype and social media platforms.

== History ==
WVD was founded in 2012 by the American film-maker Jonathan Stack while he was working on a documentary about the decision of having a vasectomy. The underlying goal was to involve men in family planning decisions and educate them about vasectomies as a simple way of taking responsibility for birth control.

== Annual events ==
In 2013, prolific vasectomist Dr Douglas Stein was scheduled to perform vasectomies in front of an audience at the Royal Institution of Australia (RiAus) to launch the inaugural World Vasectomy Day with the world’s first live-streamed vasectomy. Stein answered questions from a live audience in Australia and an international online audience.

The event's third edition was hosted by Indonesia in 2015; the fourth edition was centered in Kenya and featured a vasectomy broadcast live on Facebook.

On 17 November 2017, at its fifth anniversary, more than 1,200 vasectomists in more than 50 countries joined the event, making it the largest male-focused family planning event in history. The 2017 event's headquarter was located in Mexico.

The event has expanded in some countries from one day to three. Planned Parenthood offers free vasectomies over the three days for men who want to shift the burden of birth control from females to males. According to the official website, as of 2024 over 124,000 vasectomies have been performed by over 900 doctors in 32 different countries. In 2025 the event will be headquartered in Argentina.
