= Billy Sinclair =

American former death row inmate and journalist (born 1945)

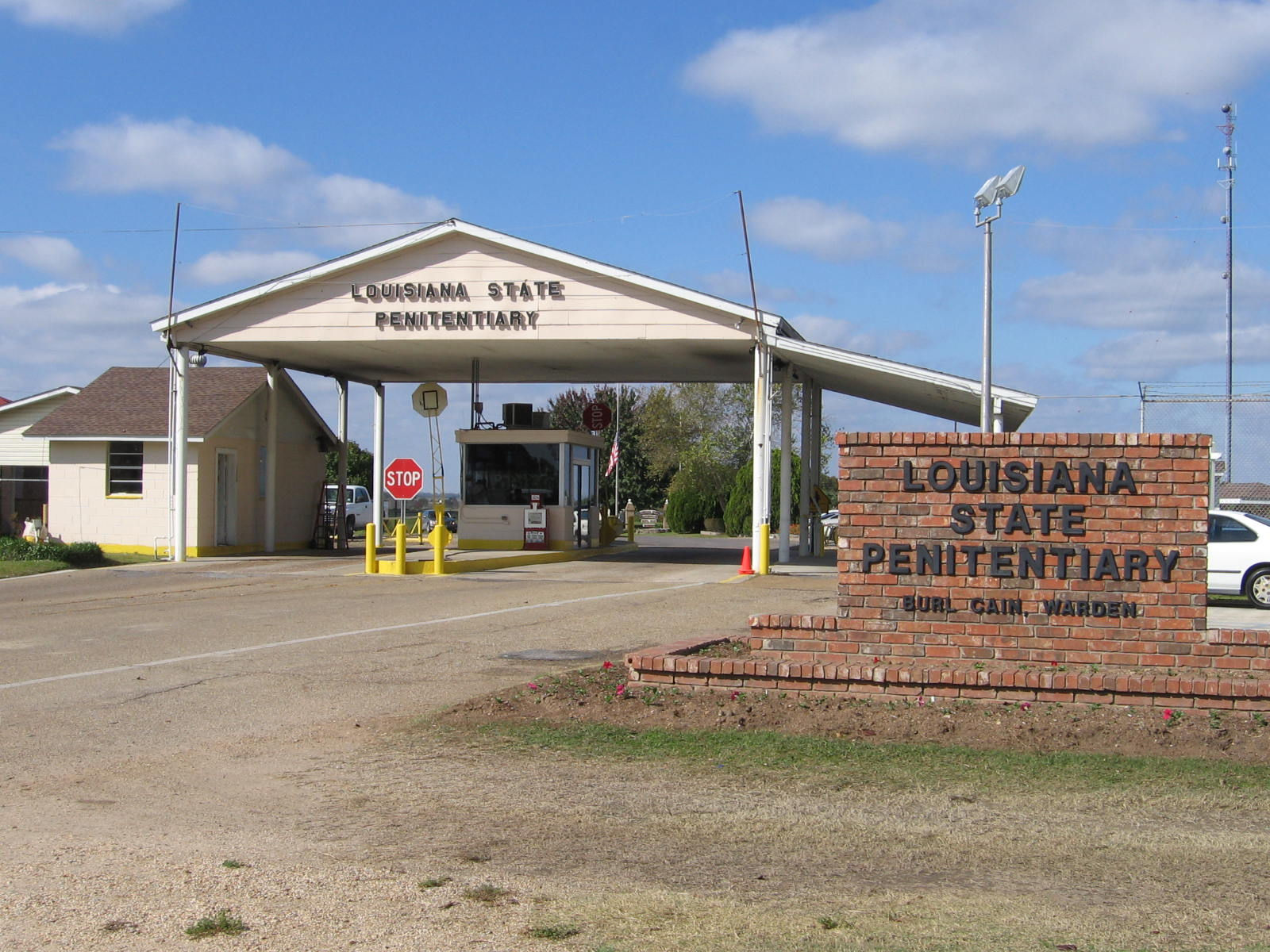
Louisiana State Penitentiary, where Sinclair was incarcerated

Billy Wayne Sinclair (born 1945) is a former prisoner at the Louisiana State Penitentiary (also known as Angola), convicted of first-degree murder and originally sentenced to death. His sentence was commuted to life in 1972. He became a notable journalist, known from 1978 for co-editing The Angolite with Wilbert Rideau; together they won some national journalism awards at the magazine, and were nominated for others. It published articles written by inmates at the prison.

In 1987 Sinclair cooperated in a federal investigation at the prison of pardons-for-sale during the administration of Governor Edwin Edwards. No charges were made against Edwards but Howard Marcellus, head of the pardon board under the Edwards administration, was convicted of bribery following a state investigation. Sinclair was moved to isolation in other secure prison quarters because his cooperation put him at risk from other inmates. With support from some law enforcement organizations, he was paroled in 2006 to the state of Texas. He had married in 1982 by proxy and lives in Houston with his wife. He works as a paralegal.

== History ==
=== Conviction and incarceration ===
In 1963 Sinclair pleaded guilty to a sex offense involving a minor. He pleaded guilty to one count of Carnal Knowledge of a Juvenile, Louisiana Revised Statutes 14:80 (commonly called "statutory rape" in other states) and served one year in state prison for this sex offense. He was 18 years of age in 1963; the juvenile girl was 16. In 1965 Sinclair at the age of 20 was convicted of killing James C. Bodden during a robbery attempt in Baton Rouge, Louisiana; he was sentenced to death in 1966. Sinclair had robbed a convenience store at gunpoint. When he fled, he was pursued by Bodden, a store employee. Sinclair turned and fatally shot Bodden while trying to escape.

In 1972 the Supreme Court of the United States temporarily abolished executions in the country due to constitutional concerns about states' unequal and arbitrary application of laws related to the death penalty. The respective state courts judicially amended death sentences to the next most severe sentence, generally, life in prison; some 587 men on death row and 26 women had their death sentences lifted. They and Sinclair received a life sentence to replace the death sentence. Sinclair was incarcerated from December 11, 1965 to April 21, 2006, a 40-year span.

In 1978 Sinclair became a co-editor with Wilbert Rideau of The Angolite, a prisoner-edited and published newsmagazine. Rideau and Sinclair became famous for their work and won numerous awards for reporting. The Columbia Journalism Review once referred to Rideau and Sinclair as "the Woodward and Bernstein of prison journalism." Neither Rideau nor Sinclair had gone beyond the ninth grade in their formal educations before their arrests and incarcerations as young men; they had become self-taught in the prison, especially through reading widely.

In 1979, Rideau and Sinclair won the George Polk Award. The Polk Award was made for the articles "The Other Side of Murder" and "Prison: a Sexual Jungle." In addition, the magazine won the Robert F. Kennedy Journalism Award and the American Bar Association's Silver Gavel Award.

On March 17, 1981, Jodie Bell, a television reporter for WAFB-TV of Baton Rouge, interviewed Sinclair. Sinclair and Bell gradually developed a relationship, and the two married by proxy on June 9, 1982. While Sinclair was incarcerated, Jodie Bell Sinclair maintained his website. Jodie Sinclair advocated for her husband's release over a 25-year period. Charles Jones, a former state representative and member of the Louisiana Senate, represented Sinclair during meetings of the Louisiana Board of Parole.

=== Reporting on pardon selling, further incarceration, release ===
Sinclair was taken out of Angola after he admitted that he was a Federal Bureau of Investigation informant. Sinclair had reported on a pardons-for-sale scheme, resulting in a scandal affecting Louisiana State Prisons and the administration of Governor of Louisiana Edwin Edwards. Ray Lamonica, a federal attorney, said that of the two dozen prisoners involved in the investigation, Sinclair was the only one to voluntarily cooperate. In 1986 the Billy Sinclair and Wilbert Rideau journalism team dissolved as a result of Sinclair revealing his role as an informant.

In 1987 federal marshals transported Sinclair out of LSP. They feared that Sinclair could be murdered in Angola because of his cooperation in the federal investigation. Jason Berry of The New York Times reported that "Sinclair became a pariah in the highly politicized prison system" and that Sinclair had "a bitter falling out with Rideau." The federal investigation did not result in an indictment of Edwards. But a parallel state investigation resulted in bribery charges against Howard Marcellus, who was the head of the pardon board under the Edwards administration. Marcellus was convicted of bribery.

After Sinclair's cooperation, the pardons board submitted a petition for clemency to the new Governor of Louisiana, Buddy Roemer; Roemer rejected the clemency petition.

By 1989, Sinclair filed a $100,000 ($259731.54 in today's money) federal lawsuit against Rideau, concerning the textbook The Wall Is Strong: Corrections in Louisiana, a University of Southwestern Louisiana compilation of magazine and newspaper articles and papers from the Center for Criminal Justice Research of the university. Rideau edited the book, and about half of the book's articles had first been published in The Angolite.

Sinclair said that four of the articles quoted in the book should have his name in the bylines, and Sinclair accused Rideau of plagiarism. Sinclair also named as defendants Burk Foster, an LSU criminal justice professor; Hilton Butler, a former warden of LSP; and Roger Thomas, a former assistant warden. Frank Polozola, the U.S. district judge, dismissed Sinclair's suit, because Sinclair had never obtained a copyright for the articles.

Sinclair said that C. Paul Phelps, then the director of the Louisiana Department of Public Safety & Corrections, and Wilbert Rideau were the most vocal of a group of journalists and officials who had opposed his release. Sinclair was moved to the Louisiana State Police Barracks, and later, to the N-5 Special Management Unit cell block in the David Wade Correctional Center because of the stigma against "snitches" in prison.

In 1987 Rideau said that he felt "betrayed" by Sinclair's actions and that The Angolite's credibility suffered with its readers. Sinclair said that a journalist agency in a prison could not operate like one in the free world. Allen Johnson Jr. of the Gambit Weekly said that A Life in the Balance: The Billy Wayne Sinclair Story, a book co-authored by Sinclair and Sinclair's wife, "paints an unflattering picture of Rideau as a self-promoter and master manipulator of the "outside" media."

The Metropolitan Crime Commission (MCC), a pro-law enforcement organization in New Orleans, supported Sinclair's parole because of his cooperation with law enforcement; as of 2001 Sinclair was the only prisoner whom the MCC advocated for release. Between 1992 and 2001 the State of Louisiana Parole Board denied parole to Sinclair six times.

On April 21, 2006, Sinclair was released on parole to the State of Texas. He was released from the C. Paul Phelps Correctional Center. Sinclair and his wife live in Bandera, Texas. Sinclair works as a paralegal for attorney John T. Floyd.
