= Lilibet Foster =

American director, producer and writer

- Born: Saint Thomas, U.S. Virgin Islands
- Occupations: Film director, producer and writer

Lilibet Foster is an American director, producer and writer. Her non-fiction films have won the Independent Spirit: Truer Than Fiction Award and been nominated for the Academy Awards Best Film of the Year by the International Documentary Association.

== Biography ==
Foster attended Windlesham House School, a private preparatory school in West Sussex, England, leaving in 1977 or 1978. She graduated from Kent School in Kent, Connecticut in 1982 and Duke University.

She produced the documentary Speaking in Strings, which received a Best Documentary nomination at the 72nd Academy Awards in 2000 and won several other awards. Speaking in Strings premiered in competition at the 1999 Sundance Film Festival.

She produced the feature documentary Soul in the Hole. It won the Independent Spirit: Truer Than Fiction Award (tied with Fast, Cheap & Out of Control) and was nominated for an IDA Award.

Foster has directed, produced, and written documentaries for major broadcasters such as Discovery ("Earth 2050: Fueling the Future"), ESPN (Marshall: Thirty Years Later), Oxygen (Operation Fine Girl: Rape Used as a Weapon of War), A&E (Biography Joe DiMaggio & Muhammad Ali) and PBS (American Cinema: Film in the Television Age). She directed and produced the multi-camera documentary and adaptation of Mark Crispin Miller's stage performance A Patriot Act. as well as segments for Stand Up To Cancer.

Foster directs branded content for brands such as Apple, Shell, Nike, Mars, and Sony, with the production company, Radical Media, for which she has won an honorary Webby Award. She directs public service announcements for such organizations as Witness, Acumen Fund, and TechnoServe.

Foster is from the U.S. Virgin Islands. She is a principal of Asphalt Films Entertainment in New York City.
