= Wilbert Rideau =

American former death row inmate and author (born 1942)

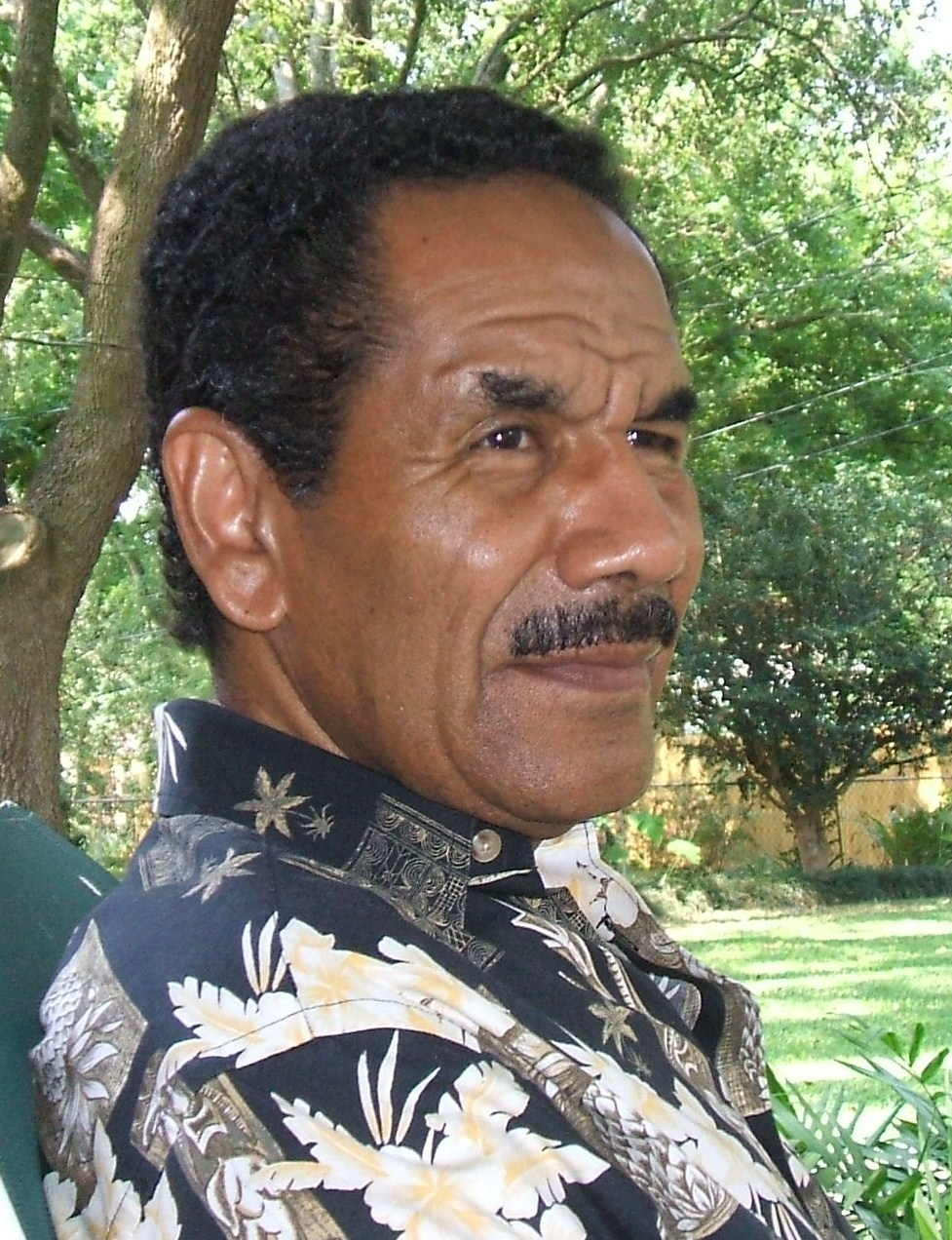
- pictured in 2008
- Born: February 13, 1942 (age 84); Louisiana
- Occupations: Author; journalist; radio correspondent; TV and film documentary filmmaker
- Status: Released in 2005 (after 44 years)
- Convictions: First-degree murder, later downgraded to manslaughter
- Penalty: Death commuted to life imprisonment, later downgraded to 21 years

Details
- Date: 1961
- Country: United States
- State: Louisiana
- Location: Lake Charles

Wilbert Rideau (born February 13, 1942) is an American former death row inmate from Lake Charles, Louisiana, who became an author and award-winning journalist while held for 44 years at Angola Prison. Rideau was convicted in 1961 of first-degree murder of Julia Ferguson in the course of a bank robbery that year, and sentenced to death. He was held in solitary confinement on death row, pending execution. After the Supreme Court of the United States ruled that states had to rework their death penalty statutes because of constitutional concerns, the Louisiana Court judicially amended his sentence in 1972 to life in prison.

During his 12 years on death row, Rideau had begun to educate himself, by reading numerous books. After being returned to the general prison population, from 1975 Rideau served for more than 20 years as editor of The Angolite, the magazine written and published by prisoners at Louisiana State Prison (Angola); he was the first African-American editor of any prison newspaper in the United States. Under his leadership, the magazine won the George Polk Award and Robert F. Kennedy Journalism Award for its reporting, and it was nominated for others.

Rideau appealed his case four times. The Supreme Court of the United States and lower courts ordered a total of three new trials; SCOTUS overturned his conviction and ordered a new trial because of adverse pre-trial publicity. He was convicted again of murder two more times, in 1964 and 1970, each time by all-male, all-white juries. He served more than 40 years in the State Penitentiary; parole was never approved. In 2005 Rideau was tried a fourth time. He was unanimously convicted by the jury of the lesser charge of manslaughter; they did not believe he had planned the killing. Rideau was sentenced to the maximum of 21 years; as he had already served nearly 44 years, he was freed.

A Life magazine article in March 1993 referred to Rideau as "the most rehabilitated prisoner in America." He has written several books and edited compilations of articles. He participated in making two documentaries, including The Farm: Angola, USA (1998), about the lives of six men at Angola, including himself. It was drawn from his memoir Life Sentences (1992) and much of the film was made at the prison.

== Childhood ==
Wilbert Rideau was born in Louisiana in 1942. When he was six, his family moved to Lake Charles, Louisiana (a city in Calcasieu Parish in the west of the state. It is about 30 miles from the Texas border). He attended racially segregated public schools, according to state law: Second Ward Elementary School in the lower grades, and starting at W. O. Boston High School when he was in eighth grade.

== Bank robbery and killing ==
Rideau was 19 when he committed an armed bank robbery in Lake Charles in 1961. He forced three white workers: Julia Ferguson, Dora McCain, and Jay Hickman into a car and drove away with them as hostages. He lined them up and shot at them six times. Ferguson and McCain fell to the ground. When Ferguson tried to get up, he stabbed her with a hunting knife. In the course of their trying to escape, Rideau fatally shot and stabbed bank teller Julia Ferguson, shot Dora McCain in the neck, and kicked her in the ribs, breaking one. The survivors testified to Rideau's guilt, noting that Rideau first shot Ferguson and then plunged a knife into the woman's chest and neck, and also shot and kicked Dora McCain, while saying "You'd better be dead." McCain and Hickman survived by pretending to be dead.

== Trials and imprisonment ==
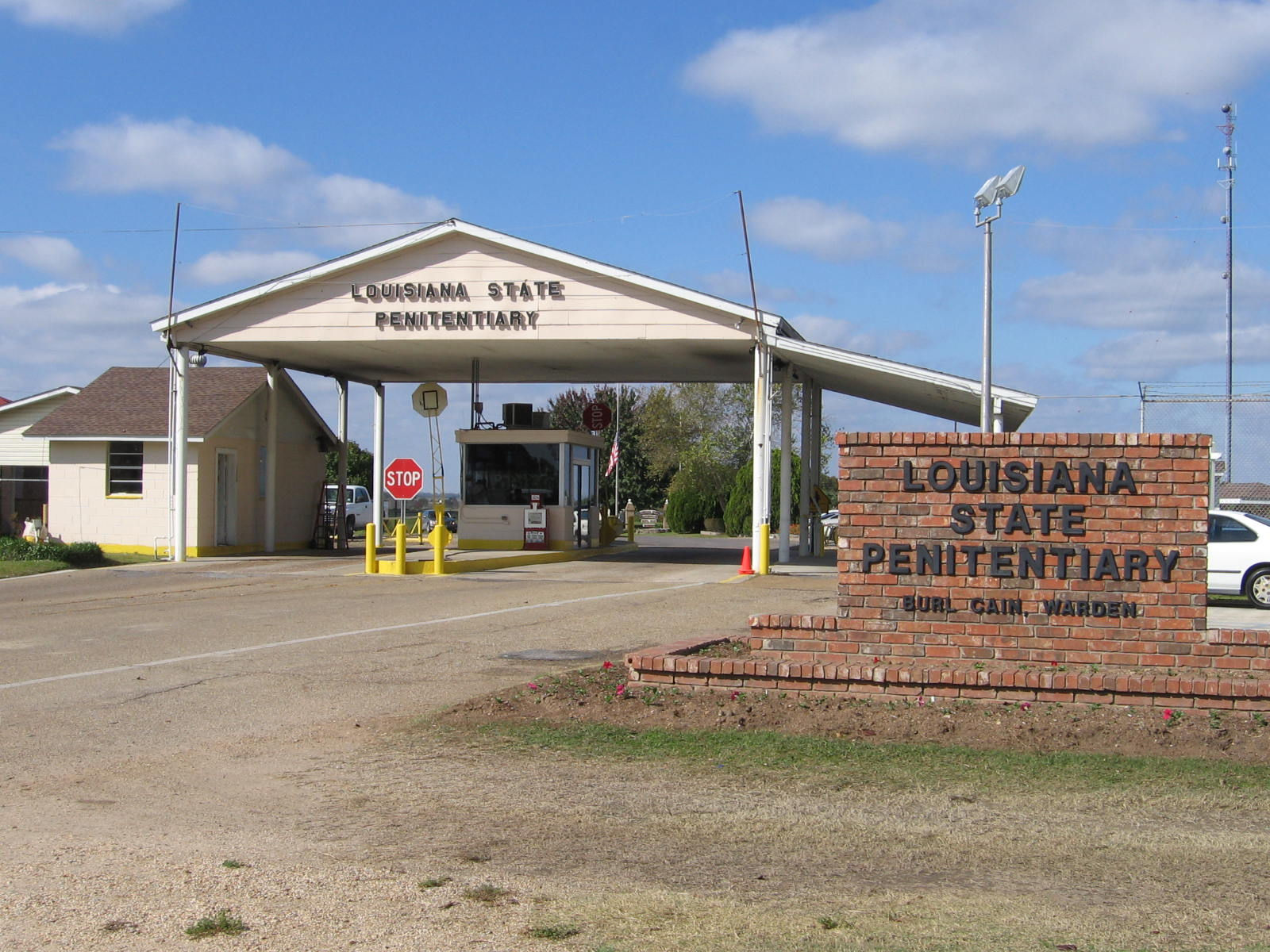
Louisiana State Penitentiary, where Rideau was incarcerated

Before Rideau was arraigned, a local television news station, KPLC-TV, filmed his being interviewed by the parish sheriff at the jail. Rideau responded to leading questions and admitted to killing teller Julia Ferguson in the course of a robbery. He did not appear to know he was being filmed, and he was without counsel. This material was broadcast three times in Calcasieu Parish, exposing a large part of the population to the interview and confession before Rideau was arraigned or taken to trial.

The defense requested a change of venue because of possible influence of the broadcast on potential jury members, which the court denied. Rideau was tried in 1961 before an all-male, all-white jury. At this time, blacks in Louisiana were still largely disenfranchised: excluded from voting, they were also excluded from juries and political office. He was convicted in less than an hour of first-degree murder in the death of teller Julia Ferguson. The jury included "two deputy sheriffs, a cousin of the dead victim and a bank vice president who knew the wounded manager". Rideau was sentenced to death, which is the punishment for first-degree murder.

His 1961 conviction was ultimately appealed to the Supreme Court. In Rideau v. Louisiana (1963), the court ruled that the adverse pre-trial publicity and failure by the lower court to grant a change of venue had compromised his receiving due process. The majority decision said, "Yet in this case the people of Calcasieu Parish saw and heard, not once but three times, a "trial" of Rideau in a jail, presided over by a sheriff, where there was no lawyer to advise Rideau of his right to stand mute." The court overturned the conviction and ordered a new trial.

The District Attorney of Calcasieu Parish, Frank Salter Jr., reindicted Rideau for the killing of Ferguson. In 1964 another all-male, all-white jury quickly convicted Rideau again of first-degree murder. That conviction was overturned by appeal, and Rideau was tried a third time in 1970. Rideau was convicted a third time of first-degree murder by an all-white jury.

He was returned to death row at Angola, where he was held in solitary confinement pending his execution. During this time, he became determined to become educated. He started reading widely, and credits books with helping him survive and become a better person.

In 1972, following the Supreme Court ruling in Furman v. Georgia, finding the current state laws unconstitutional as they varied widely in how they administered the death penalty, the court ordered states to void the death sentences of persons on death row. They ordered their sentences to be amended to the next most severe level, generally life imprisonment. Some 587 men and 26 women were moved off death rows across the country. Rideau's sentence was amended by Louisiana to life in prison.

Rideau was moved into the general prison population. After another appeal, based on the exclusion of blacks from the grand jury that had indicted him in 1970, despite passage of civil rights legislation in the mid-1960s to end racial discrimination, Rideau's last conviction was vacated.

A new trial was ordered and he was tried a fourth time in 2005. The jury was made up of ten women and two men, seven whites and five blacks. They deliberated for nearly six hours before reaching a unanimous decision, convicting him of the lesser charge of manslaughter. The judge sentenced him to the maximum of 21 years. Since Rideau had already served more than twice that time, nearly 44 years, he was freed immediately.

== Legal history of the case ==
Rideau's criminal case reached the Supreme Court on appeal. In Rideau v. Louisiana, 373 U.S. 723 (1963), the court made a landmark ruling related to the effects of adverse pre-trial publicity and the refusal of the court to agree to a change of venue, which it ruled was a denial of due process of law for the defendant. The Court overturned Rideau's 1961 conviction because of the repeated broadcasts by the local television station of the sheriff's "interview" with Rideau in jail, and with no counsel. The Court said this resulted in "Kangaroo Court proceedings" and a kind of public trial in the media before his case ever reached court. In addition, the Parish Court had refused the defense attorney's request for a change of venue. The Supreme Court ordered a new trial.

Rideau was retried by the Parish District Attorney for first-degree murder in 1964 and again convicted. After another appeal because of errors, he was retried in 1970; each of those convictions for first-degree murder were also by all-male, all-white juries. He remained on death row at Angola.

In 1972 the Supreme Court ruled in Furman v. Georgia that state laws for the death penalty were unconstitutional as currently written. States were ordered to judicially amend death sentences to the next level of severity, generally life imprisonment. Rideau and hundreds of other persons (mostly men) on death row across the country had their death sentences changed to life imprisonment.

In 2000, a federal appeals court ruled that Rideau's original indictment was flawed, because blacks had been excluded from the 1961 grand jury, which had indicted him on first-degree murder charges. (These charges were repeated by the prosecutor in subsequent trials.)

The Lake Charles, Louisiana, community divided largely along racial lines for four decades over the Rideau case. The parole board had repeatedly recommended he be given parole, but two Louisiana governors declined to approve it, largely due to strong local pressure from whites in Calcasieu Parish. In the fourth and final trial in January 2005, most white spectators sat behind the prosecutor's table and most blacks sat behind the defense.

Rideau had always admitted robbing the bank, fleeing with hostage employees, and killing one of them. Attorneys in the final trial presented two versions of these events. The prosecution held that Rideau used premeditation to line up his victims before shooting them, and that Ferguson had begged for her life. The defense said that Rideau had panicked and reacted impulsively - first, when a phone call interrupted the robbery, and then when hostage Dora McCain jumped from the get-away car and ran, followed by the other two employees. He said that Rideau killed in panic rather than by premeditation. The defense urged a verdict of manslaughter. The jury unanimously convicted Rideau of manslaughter, and the judge sentenced him to the maximum of 21 years. As Rideau had already served more than twice that long, he was immediately freed.

== Prison journalism ==
In the early 1970s, Rideau wrote a column, "The Jungle", for a chain of black weeklies in Louisiana. He freelanced articles to mainstream media, including the Shreveport Journal and Penthouse. A headline referred to him as "The Wordman of Angola", saying "Rideau is Angola Penitentiary's Birdman of Alcatraz. He is a prisoner who has transformed the dark, drab, terror-filled life of prison into a greenhouse for the flowering of his talent."

Rideau had not gone beyond the ninth grade in his formal education before his arrest and incarceration. He educated himself by extensive reading while in prison.

In 1975, a federal court ordered the Angola prison to be reformed, the result of a civil suit by the ACLU because of the high level of violence and abuse of prisoner rights. The consent decree required the prison to institute desegregation of programs and work assignments. The outgoing warden appointed Rideau as editor of The Angolite; he was the first African-American editor of any prison journal in the United States. The incoming warden ratified the choice and, with a handshake, gave Rideau freedom from censorship. This warden's progressive administration supported the nation's only uncensored prison publication. During his 25 years as editor, Rideau became well known nationally, gaining a reputation beyond the prison.

In 1979, Rideau and co-editor Billy Sinclair won the George Polk Award for the articles "The Other Side of Murder" and "Prison: The Sexual Jungle". In addition, the magazine won the Robert F. Kennedy Journalism Award, the American Bar Association's Silver Gavel Award, and a 1981 Sidney Hillman Award. The Angolite was the first prison publication ever to be nominated for a National Magazine Award, and it was nominated seven times.

Rideau was permitted to travel the state accompanied only by an unarmed guard to lecture about the prison newspaper. He was permitted to fly to Washington, D.C. twice to address the nation's newspaper editors on the subject of prison journalism.

Rideau and co-editor Ron Wikberg were named "Person of the Week" for their journalism on Peter Jennings's World News Tonight in August 1992. Wikberg was the Angolite associate editor from 1988 to 1992 (he was paroled that year). He died in October 1994.

== Books and compilations ==
After being released, Rideau wrote In the Place of Justice: A Story of Punishment and Deliverance (2010), recalling his experiences in Angola. It won the 2011 Dayton Literary Peace Prize and was shortlisted for the British CWA Gold Dagger prize for non-fiction.

With Ron Wikberg, associate editor, Rideau edited The Wall Is Strong: Corrections in Louisiana (1991), used as a textbook. This textbook was a compilation of magazine and newspaper articles, and papers from the Center for Criminal Justice Research of University of Southwestern Louisiana. About half of the book's articles were first published in The Angolite. Rideau and Wikberg collaborated on the book with Professor Burk Foster of the University of Louisiana at Lafayette.

Rideau and Wikberg also collaborated on Life Sentences: Rage and Survival Behind Bars, a 1992 anthology of articles from The Angolite. It was published in 1992 by Times Books, a subsidiary of Random House, but went out of print.

This book came to the attention of Elizabeth Garbus and Jonathan Stack, a pair of New York documentary filmmakers. They drew from it for their film The Farm: Angola, USA (1998). Rideau was credited for his work with them on the film; he was also among the six men featured in the documentary, which has won numerous awards.

== Other media ==
In the 1990s, Rideau branched out into radio, television, and documentary film making. He became a correspondent for National Public Radio, produced a segment for ABC-TV's newsmagazine Day One; and collaborated with radio documentarian Dave Isay for a piece entitled "Tossing Away the Keys."

He collaborated on creating and producing two documentary films, Final Judgment: The Execution of Antonio James (1996), directed and produced by filmmakers Jonathan Stack and Elizabeth Garbus, and The Farm: Angola, USA (1998), directed by the same pair, with credit also to Rideau. The latter drew from Life Sentences, the book which he and the late Ron Wikberg had edited together. The Farm won an Emmy Award and several others, as well as being as nominated for an Academy Award.

== Clemency efforts ==
Mother Jones said in 2010 that "a mix of racial politics and tough-on-crime posturing blocked [Rideau's] release for more than three decades", even though several LSP wardens had said that Rideau was completely rehabilitated. The parole board recommended parole for him, but two governors declined to approve it. Many local people in Calcasieu Parish opposed any parole for him. Rideau remained incarcerated through the mid-1990s, while other inmates with similar sentences were paroled in this period.

An investigation by 20/20 revealed statements by Governor of Louisiana Edwin Edwards, who said that he believed that Rideau was rehabilitated, but that he would not release him "under any circumstances'. Rideau said that governors did not advocate for his release because he had become "a political football" due to his appeals and retrials. He believed that it would be difficult for any prisoner in Louisiana to be released from prison.

== Fourth appeal, trial, and aftermath ==
In 1998 the Legal Defense Fund of the NAACP joined his case and participated in mounting a fourth appeal. In December 2000, the Fifth Circuit Court of Appeals in New Orleans threw out Rideau's 1970 murder conviction, based on grounds of racial discrimination in the grand jury process in Calcasieu Parish, Louisiana, which had indicted him. All the members of the grand jury were white.

To the surprise of many outside the area, the Calcasieu Parish prosecutor decided to try Rideau for a fourth time for first-degree murder. Rideau was indicted again in July 2001. The jury, composed of both men and women, and blacks and whites, unanimously found him guilty of manslaughter. They did not believe that he had planned the killing of the clerk. The judge sentenced Rideau to the maximum of 21 years, but he had already served nearly 44, more than twice that, so he was released. Whereas Rideau had been represented by local court-appointed defense attorneys in his first three trials, his defense team in 2005 included prominent civil rights attorneys: Johnnie Cochran, George Kendall, and famed New Orleans defense attorney Julian Murray, who all worked on the case for free, or pro bono.

The retrial was prosecuted under the laws in effect at the time of the crime in 1961. The jury was free to convict Rideau of murder – the state elected to prosecute under the "specific intent" rather than the "felony murder" doctrine of the 1961 statute – or manslaughter, which in Louisiana is any homicide that would otherwise be murder if it is either committed without specific intent to harm an individual, or if it is committed in the heat of passion. The defense said that Rideau had become panicked during the robbery and especially by the hostages attempting to escape.

Shortly after Rideau's release, Judge David Ritchie, who had declared Rideau indigent at trial, ordered him to pay more than $127,000 to the court to cover the cost of the trial that ultimately freed him. This order was overturned in 2006 by the Louisiana Court of Appeals for the Third Circuit.

The Louisiana Court of Appeals stated:

[ . . . ] we find the trial court lacked legal authority to act for the parish of Calcasieu and lacked standing in its own right to seek recoupment of funds expended from the Criminal Court Fund. The trial court, however, retains authority to enforce the January 15, 2005 sentence which ordered Rideau to pay costs and to assess reasonable costs upon presentment by the parties who actually "incurred" the Article 887(A) expenses, consistent with this opinion and the Constitutions of Louisiana and the United States. We also vacate that portion of the March 15, 2005 Order directing Rideau to reimburse the IDB [Indigent Defender's Board] for all costs, expert witness fees and expenses associated with his defense.

== After release ==
In 2008 Rideau married Linda LaBranche, a former college professor who had become one of his supporters years before.

In 2009, he co-directed and was included in the documentary The Farm: 10 Down (2009), Jonathan Stack's follow-up to the survivors among the six men he had featured in his earlier film on Angola. Rideau was the only one among them to have left the prison alive.

Since his release, Rideau has continued to write. He published a memoir, In the Place of Justice: A Story of Punishment and Deliverance (2010), about his years at Angola. He has frequently been asked to speak about his experiences, and his work to rehabilitate himself while in prison.

In 2011 Rideau was one of the invited speakers at the Newark Peace Education Summit in Newark, New Jersey. In April of that year, he was invited to the Roosevelt Hotel to receive the George Polk Award for journalism and give a long overdue speech. He had won the journalism award in 1980 for a series of essays titled The Sexual Jungle, which he published in The Angolite when he was still in prison.
