= Liberia: An Uncivil War =

2004 American–Liberian documentary film

- Directed by: Jonathan Stack; James Martin Brabazon
- Produced by: Jonathan Stack
- Cinematography: Axel Baumann; James Brabazon; Tim Hetherington; Jonathan Stack
- Edited by: Michael Kovalenko
- Music by: Barney McAll
- Production company: Gabriel Films
- Release date: 7 August 2004 (USA)
- Running time: 102 min.
- Country: Liberia
- Language: English

Liberia: An Uncivil War, (also as Liveria: O pio skliros emfylios), is a 2004 American-Liberian documentary TV movie co-directed Jonathan Stack and James Martin Brabazon. The film was co-produced by both directors: James Brabazon and Jonathan Stack for Gabriel Films. The documentary revolves around the American interference for 2003 summer in Liberia where a power struggle between the rebel movement Liberians United for Reconciliation and Democracy (LURD) and government leader Charles Taylor. Due to the war, hundreds of innocent civilians die from mortar shells.

The film stars Zubin Cooper himself and Liberian president Charles Taylor. The film also included the video footage of American president George W. Bush. The film had its premier on 7 August 2004 in the United States of America. Then, the film was screened on 5 April 2005 at Thessaloniki Documentary Festival, Greece, on 23 April 2005 at Independent Film Festival of Boston, USA and then on 29 April 2005 at One World Film Festival, Czech Republic.

== Cast ==
- George W. Bush (archive footage)
- Zubin Cooper
- Charles Taylor, Liberian President
