= Nadja Salerno-Sonnenberg =

Italian violinist (born 1961)

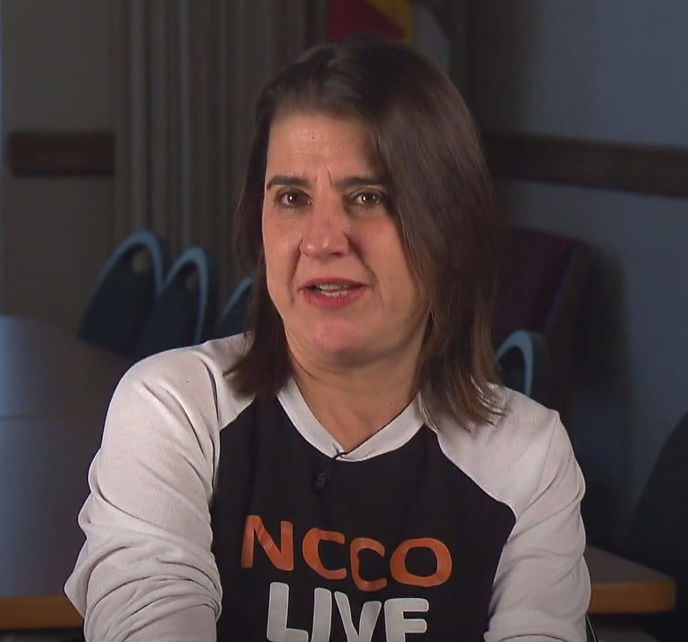
- Born: January 10, 1961 (age 65); Rome, Italy
- Occupations: Classical violinist; Author
- Years active: 1986–present
- Website: nadjasalernosonnenberg.com

Nadja Salerno-Sonnenberg (born January 10, 1961) is an Italian and American classical violinist and teacher.

== Early life and education ==
Salerno-Sonnenberg was born in Rome, Italy. Her father left when she was three months old. She emigrated with her mother to the United States at age eight, relocating to Cherry Hill, New Jersey. She studied at the Curtis Institute of Music and later with Dorothy DeLay at the Juilliard School of Music and the Aspen Music Festival and School.

== Career ==
In 1981, she became the youngest-ever prize winner in the Walter W. Naumburg International Violin Competition. In 1982, she was a soloist with the Naumburg Orchestral Concerts, in the Naumburg Bandshell, Central Park (NY), summer series. She received an Avery Fisher Career Grant in 1983, and in 1999 she was awarded the Avery Fisher Prize for "outstanding achievement and excellence in music".

In 1989, she wrote Nadja: On My Way, an autobiography written for children. In May 1999 she received an honorary Master of Musical Arts degree from New Mexico State University, the university's first honorary degree. She is also the subject of Paola di Florio's documentary Speaking in Strings, which was nominated for an Academy Award in 2000.

In 1994, Salerno-Sonnenberg badly injured her left little finger while chopping onions as she prepared Christmas dinner for friends and family. Her fingertip was surgically reattached and took six months to heal. During that time, she refingered compositions so that she could play using only three fingers and continued to perform.

After her finger healed, she became depressed. In 1995, she attempted suicide but the gun failed to fire.

In 2003, Salerno-Sonnenberg performed the world premiere of Sérgio Assad's Triple Concerto, a work for violin, two guitars and orchestra with the Assad brothers and the St. Paul Chamber Orchestra in St. Paul, Minnesota. The same work, called "Originis", was recorded in 2009 with Salerno-Sonnenberg, the Assads, and the Orquestra Sinfônica do Estado de São Paulo.

Salerno-Sonnenberg has released many recordings on Angel/EMI Classics and Nonesuch. In 2005, she also created her own label, NSS Music. She has performed with orchestras around the world and played at the White House. She has also performed with such popular artists as Mandy Patinkin, Joe Jackson, and Mark O'Connor. She has frequently collaborated with pianist Anne-Marie McDermott.

In 2008, Salerno-Sonnenberg was selected as the music director of the New Century Chamber Orchestra under a three-year contract. After completing her first season with the orchestra, Salerno-Sonnenberg said: "I also have a solo career that I have to maintain—and I do. And I have a record label. I have three full-time jobs, and I don't know how long I can keep up this pace."

In 2013 it was reported that American composer Samuel Jones was writing a violin concerto for Salerno-Sonnenberg.

In 2015, Salerno-Sonnenberg joined Loyola University New Orleans as a Resident Artist.

Salerno-Sonnenberg has continued to perform with various symphonies, including the Baltimore Symphony Orchestra, the Atlanta Symphony Orchestra, and the Seattle Symphony, as well as at festivals like Wolf Trap.

Salerno-Sonnenberg plays a Peter Guarneri violin called the "Miss Beatrice Lutyens, ex Cte de Sasserno, Cremona 1721".

== Critical reception ==
In 2006, The Washington Post characterized Salerno-Sonnenberg as a "fiercely original, deeply emotive violinist". Over the 25 years she had already been concertizing, "her playing, always mercurial and exciting but occasionally a little scattershot, has become positively reliable, both musically and technically, without losing any of the wild electricity that always set her apart." The only criticism the reviewer made of her interpretation was of "her characteristic tendency to break up the melodic line into fragments".

Some reviewers criticized the clothes she wore during performances, her facial "grimaces", and her "almost abandoned disregard". Critic Martin Bernheimer said that Salerno-Sonnenberg was "battling the composer rather than interpreting the composer." Another critic disagreed: "I don't care what she wears or how she moves as long as she keeps playing with such passionate intelligence." Fans have found her performances "exhilarating". In 2004, Salerno-Sonnenberg said she answered "hundreds of fan letters a year" on her website.

In later years, some critics who had originally been irritated by Salerno-Sonnenberg's on-stage mannerisms said they "no longer bother" them. While still complaining about some of her interpretations, one critic nonetheless called her a technical virtuoso.

== In other media ==
She was a guest several times on NBC's The Tonight Show Starring Johnny Carson, and was also featured on 60 Minutes in 1986. In May 1999, 60 Minutes II aired a follow-up. In 2001, she appeared as herself on the sitcom Dharma & Greg in the episode "Dream A Little Dream of Her".
