= The Wildest Show in the South: The Angola Prison Rodeo =

1999 film

- Directed by: Simeon Soffer
- Produced by: Peter Ginsburg; Simeon Soffer; Jonathan Stack
- Cinematography: Ramzy Telley, Mike Cohen, Simeon Soffer, Mark Miks
- Distributed by: Seventh Art Releasing
- Release date: 1999
- Country: United States
- Language: English

The Wildest Show in the South: The Angola Prison Rodeo is a 1999 American short documentary film directed by Simeon Soffer. It was nominated for an Academy Award for Best Documentary Short.
