= Jonathan Stack =

American filmmaker (born 1957)

- Born: Jonathan David Stack; June 2, 1957 (age 67); New York City, US
- Occupation: Filmmaker

Jonathan David Stack (born June 2, 1957) is an American documentary filmmaker. He is also a co-founder of World Vasectomy Day.

== Biography ==
Born in New York City to a teacher and worker, Jonathan spent much of his childhood exploring. He took an early interest to film. His family traveled with him, which inspired him to learn about other cultures and teach himself several foreign languages. Through a chance encounter with a National Geographic film crew, Stack decided to pursue what has been a lifelong interest in film, specializing in documentaries.

== Career ==
During his career, Stack has written, produced and directed over 25 films and 50 television programs. Among the best-known are The Farm: Angola, USA (1998), exploring Louisiana State Prison (LSP) through the lives of six inmates, which he co-directed and co-produced with Elizabeth Garbus. They also collaborated with Wilbert Rideau, a life prisoner who was editor of The Angolite, a prisoner-run magazine, and whose book Life Sentences (1992) recounted the stories of several inmates. This film was honored with the Sundance Film Festival's Grand Jury Prize and an Emmy Award, and was nominated for an Academy Award. He had earlier worked with Garbus as director and producer of Final Judgment: The Execution of Antonio James(1996), also filmed at LSP.

Moved by the life of Vincent Simmons, Stack returned to film Shadows of Doubt: Vincent Simmons (2009) about his case. Simmons struggled for years to gain the evidence file in his case, which he finally could read in 1993. He continues to say that he is innocent and was poorly represented; he notes many inconsistencies in evidence, much of which the prosecution suppressed. Stack filmed interviews with family and other residents of Avoyelles Parish, and a meeting of Simmons with the twins who had accused him of rape. Stack also returned to LSP to film The Farm: 10 Down (2009), a follow-up 10 years later with the survivors (including Simmons) among the six men featured in the 1998 The Farm. He continues to be deeply interested in issues associated with incarceration and the criminal justice system in the United States, and has made several films related to this.

While working as an independent filmmaker, Stack has earned a reputation for his ability to gain access into forbidden and even dangerous worlds. His exclusives include President Charles Taylor's farewell speech to the nation of Liberia (Liberia: An Uncivil War co-directed by James Martin Brabazon), and a rare interview with David Miscavige, head of the Church of Scientology (Inside the Church of Scientology). In 2008, Stack was the executive producer of Iron Ladies of Liberia, directed by Elizabeth Garbus. The film tells about Ellen Johnson Sirleaf, the contemporary president of Liberia and Africa's first female president.

Over the course of his career, Stack has collaborated with artists and filmmakers from around the world. His films have been distributed through HBO, BBC, Channel Four, the Discovery Channel, A&E, Netflix, and many other sources.

In 1991, Stack founded Gabriel Films, an independent documentary film production company. In 2008, he formed Highest Common Denominator Media Group. Stack and HCD Media Group's newest venture is Gabriel City, an online community for those affected by incarceration in the United States.

== Filmography ==
Films

The Farm: 10 Down (2009)
The Road to Redemption (2008)
Iron Ladies of Liberia (2007)
Dear Talula (2007)
Sick Humor (2003)
Justifiable Homicide (2002)
The Rodney Hulin Story (2001)
900 Women: Life in St. Gabriel's Women's Prison] (2001)
No Escape: Prison Rape (2001)
Fight to the Max (2000)
The Gospel According to Mr. Allen (2000)
The Wildest Show in the South: The Angola Prison Rodeo (1999)
Shadows of Doubt: The State v. 85188 Vincent Simmons (1999)
The Farm: Angola, USA (film) (1998)
Final Judgment: The Execution of Antonio James] (1996)
Harlem Diary: Nine Voices of Resilience] (1995)
Shop Till You Drop (1993)
Boys From the Bronx (1993)
Damned in the USA (1991)
One Generation More (1991)

Television:
A Decade Behind Bars: Return to the Farm (National Geographic Channel)
Liberia: An Uncivil War (Discovery Times Channel)
Guns in America: Gun Life (Discovery Channel)
Return of the Kamikaze Kid (Discovery Channel)
New Orleans: Crime in the Crescent City (Court TV)
New York Justice (A&E)
Rite of Passage: Body-Piercing (Discovery Channel)
Medicine Behind Bars (Discovery Health)
Inshallah: Diary of an Afghan Woman (Oxygen)
After 9/11: Rebuilding Lives (Discovery Channel)
Only In America (Discovery Times)
Frontline/World (PBS)
A Chance to Grow (Discovery Channel)

== Awards ==
- The Road to Redemption
- International Documentary Film Festival Amsterdam - Official Selection, 2008

The Farm: Angola, USA (film)

- Sundance Film Festival - Grand Jury Prize, 1998
- Academy Awards - Best Documentary Feature: Nominee, 1999
- Doubletake Documentary Film Festival - Audience Award, 1998
- Emmy Awards - 1999
  - Outstanding Achievement in Non-Fiction Programming - Cinematography
  - Outstanding Achievement in Non-Fiction Programming - Picture Editing
  - Outstanding Achievement in Non-Fiction Programming - Sound Editing: Nominee
  - Outstanding Non-Fiction Special: Nominee
- Santa Barbara International Film Festival - Best Documentary, 2000
- Florida Film Festival - Grand Jury Prize, 1998
- San Francisco Film Festival - Golden Gate Award, 1998
- Thurgood Marshall Award, 1999
- New York Film Critics Circle - Best Non-Fiction Film, 1998
- National Society of Film Critics - Best Non-Fiction Film, 1999
- Los Angeles Film Critics Association - Best Documentary Film, 1999
- Taos Talking Pictures Film Festival - Taos Land Grant Award: Nominee, 1998
- Satellite Awards - Best Documentary: Nominee - 1998

Dear Talula

- Ashland Independent Film Festival - Best Short, 2007
- International Cancer Film Festival - 2008

Iron Ladies of Liberia

- Encounters South Africa International Documentary Festival - Among the top 3 International Films

Liberia: An Uncivil War

- International Documentary Film Festival Amsterdam - Special Jury Prize, 2004
- International Documentary Association - Courage Under Fire Award, 2004
- Emmy Awards - Nominated Twice, 2005
- Amnesty International - DOEN Award Winner

The Wildest Show in the South: The Angola Prison Rodeo

- Academy Award - Nominee, 2000
- International Documentary Association - Short Documentary Winner, 2000

Final Judgment: The Execution of Antonio James

- CINE Film - Golden Eagle Award, 1996
- Emmy Award - Winner, 1996
- CableACE Award - Winner, 1996

Harlem Diary: Nine Voices of Resilience

- CINE Film - Golden Eagle Award, 1994
- CableACE Award - Winner, 1994

Damned in the USA

- International Emmy Award - Best Arts Documentary, 1992

One Generation More

- CINE Film] - Golden Eagle Award, 1991
