= The Angolite =

American prisoner-run magazine in Louisiana

- Former editors: Wilbert Rideau (original co-editor 1975–1987, associate editor 1997–2005)
- Frequency: Bimonthly
- Founded: 1976; 50 years ago
- Company: Louisiana State Penitentiary
- Country: United States
- Based in: Angola, Louisiana
- Language: English
- ISSN: 0402-4249

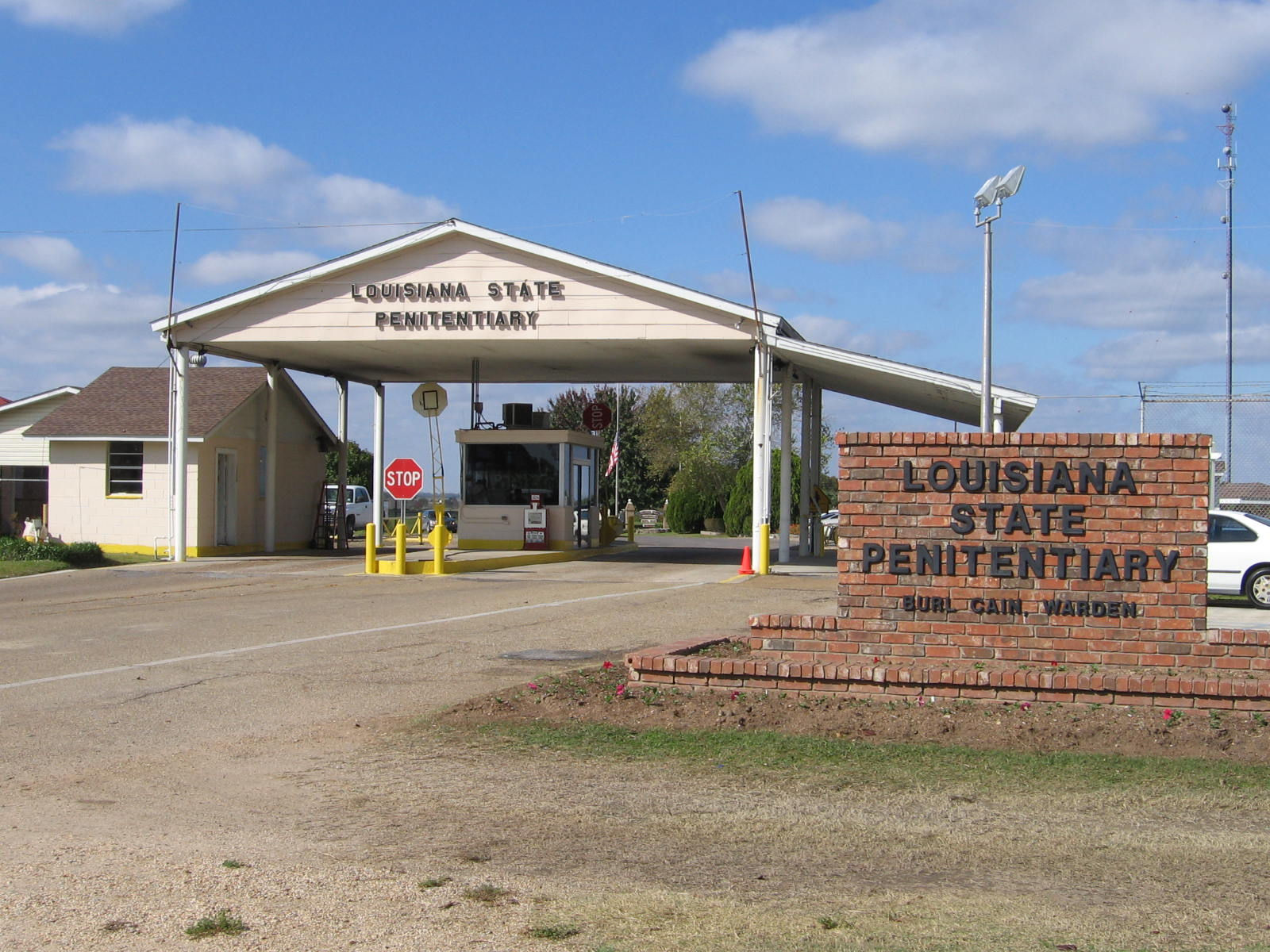
The Angolite is published from the Louisiana State Penitentiary

The Angolite is the inmate-edited and published prison magazine of the Louisiana State Penitentiary (Angola) in West Feliciana Parish, Louisiana.

== History ==
As with the rest of the prison, The Angolite was segregated; originally only white prisoners, a minority at the facility, were allowed to work on it. Under federal court-ordered reforms, including desegregation of work assignments and programs, the prison warden picked Wilbert Rideau as editor in 1975. He was the first African-American editor of any prison newspaper in the United States. This choice was ratified in 1976 by a new prison warden. In 2009, the magazine published six issues annually. Louisiana prison officials believed that an independently edited publication would help the prison.

The Angolite gained a national reputation for reporting. It won international awards under prisoner co-editors Rideau and Billy Sinclair; Sinclair joined as co-editor in 1978. The magazine won the George Polk Award in 1979, for the articles "The Other Side of Murder" and "Prison: a Sexual Jungle".

The magazine won the Robert F. Kennedy Journalism Award and the American Bar Association's Silver Gavel Award. The Angolite was the first prison publication ever to be nominated for a National Magazine Award, for which it was nominated seven times by early 1993. In 1993 the Columbia Journalism Review referred to Rideau and Sinclair as "the Woodward and Bernstein of prison journalism."

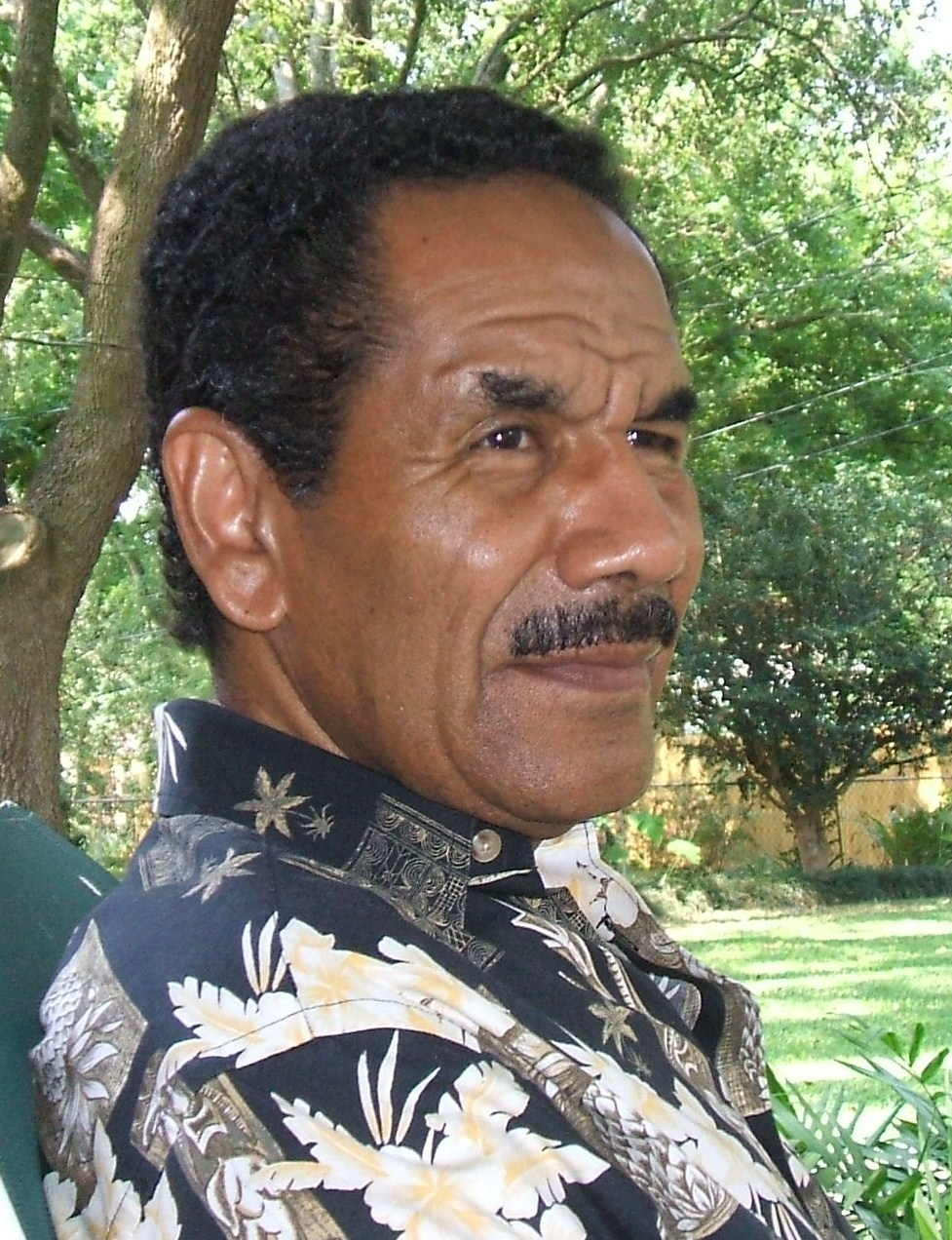
Wilbert Rideau was a co-editor of The Angolite from 1975 to 1987, gaining an associate editor to 1992; Rideau served until his release in 2005

In 1987 Sinclair disclosed that he had been cooperating with the Federal Bureau of Investigation in their investigation at the prison of a pardons-for-sale scheme. Eventually the state indicted the head of the pardons board, an appointee of Governor Edwin Edwards. No federal or state charges were made against Edwards. The New York Times said, "But news of Mr. Sinclair's role shattered The Angolite's credibility. Mr. Sinclair, now a snitch, has been transferred out of the prison for his own safety, leaving Mr. Rideau to confront skeptical readers and sources."

Federal authorities feared that Sinclair could be murdered in Angola. Jason Berry of The New York Times reported that "Sinclair became a pariah in the highly politicized prison system" and that he had "a bitter falling out with Rideau." Sinclair was moved by authorities to highly secure quarters within the Louisiana State Police Barracks, and later, the N-5 Special Management Unit cell block in the David Wade Correctional Center, for his protection. In 1987 Rideau said that he felt "betrayed" by Sinclair's actions and that The Angolite's credibility suffered with its readers. Sinclair said that a journalist agency in a prison could not operate like one in the free world.

In 1989, Sinclair filed a $100,000 federal lawsuit against Rideau, in an argument about authorship. Rideau had edited The Wall Is Strong: Corrections in Louisiana, " a compilation of magazine and newspaper articles, and papers from the Center for Criminal Justice Research of University of Southwestern Louisiana the university. About half the newspaper articles were from The Angolite. Sinclair said that four of the articles used in the book should have credited him in the bylines, and he accused Rideau of plagiarism. Sinclair also named as defendants Burk Foster, an LSU criminal justice professor; Hilton Butler, a former warden of LSP; and Roger Thomas, a former assistant warden at LSP. In 1991 Frank Polozola, the U.S. district judge, dismissed Sinclair's suit, because Sinclair had never obtained a copyright for the articles.

In 1988 Ron Gene Wikberg became associate editor on the magazine. He and Rideau collaborated on editing some compilations of articles and stories from the magazine. In 1991 they worked on a textbook, The Wall Is Strong: Corrections in Louisiana (1991). It was a compilation of magazine and newspaper articles, and papers from the Center for Criminal Justice Research of University of Southwestern Louisiana. Together they edited and published Life Sentences in 1992 (now out of print), articles and stories drawn from The Angolite. Wikberg was paroled in 1992.

== Status within the prison ==
In 2007 The Angolite received the 11th annual Thurgood Marshall Journalism Award for Print Journalism, for its record of journalism.

In Angola in the early 21st century, some prisoners argue that the prison administration uses the magazine for propaganda. Scholar Kalen Mary Ann Churcher of Pennsylvania State University described it in 2008 as "a pseudo-pacifier for a select group of men who 'sold out' to the state and now get to walk through a few more doors unsupervised."

In 2010 Rideau said that even during the period when he was still incarcerated, the LSP administration under Burl Cain began "clamping down" on the newspaper. He was released in 2005 after a new trial in which he was convicted on lesser charges, for which he had served twice the maximum sentence. About the current magazine, he said,

If you pick up the magazine now, there's no controversy, there's no criticism of the administration or anything that's going on in the prison. There's a whole lot about sports and religion. They'll write about issues, but not about practices. Mostly it's about religion.
