= Garbus =

Garbus is a surname. Notable people with the surname include:

- Liz Garbus (born c. 1969/1970), American film director and producer
- Martin Garbus (born 1934), American attorney
- Merrill Garbus (born 1979), American musician
