= Shouting Fire =

Shouting Fire may refer to:

- Shouting fire in a crowded theater, a phrase that deals with the topic of freedom of speech
- Shouting Fire: Stories from the Edge of Free Speech, a 2009 documentary by Liz Garbus
