= Justin Wilkes =

American producer

Justin Wilkes is a film and television producer. Best known for producing documentary What Happened, Miss Simone? that earned him Academy Award for Best Documentary Feature nomination at 88th Academy Awards with co-producer Amy Hobby and director Liz Garbus. Wilkes also produced the Peabody Award-winning documentary film Judy Blume Forever, that premiered on Amazon Prime Video in 2023.

== Filmography ==
- Fade to Black
- Iconoclasts
- Oprah's Master Class
- Under African Skies
- Jay Z, Made in America
- What Happened, Miss Simone?
- Park Bench with Steve Buscemi
- America Divided
- Stan Against Evil
- Mars'
- Rebuilding Paradise
- Julia
- Light & Magic
- We Feed People
- Judy Blume Forever
- The Super Models
- The Truth About Jim
- Music by John Williams
- I Am Not a Monster: The Lois Riess Murders
- Freefall: A Reckoning for Boeing
- Marty, Life Is Short

=== Accolades ===
Year	Award	Category	Nominee(s)	Result	Ref.
2022	Peabody Awards	Documentary	Lucy and Desi	Nominated	
2023	Peabody Awards	Arts	Judy Blume Forever	Won	
