= 2009 Taconic State Parkway crash =

2009 traffic collision in Pleasantville, New York

Coordinates: 41°07′11″N 73°48′25″W

Details
- Date: July 26, 2009; 17 years ago 1:35 pm EDT
- Location: Taconic State Parkway, Mount Pleasant, New York, U.S.

Statistics
- Vehicles: 2003 Ford Windstar minivan 2004 Chevrolet TrailBlazer SUV; 2002 Chevrolet Tracker SUV
- Deaths: 8
- Injured: 3

The 2009 Taconic State Parkway crash was a traffic collision that occurred shortly after 1:30 p.m. on July 26, 2009, on the Taconic State Parkway in the town of Mount Pleasant, New York, United States. A minivan, being driven by 36-year-old Diane Schuler, traveled 1.7 miles (2.7 km) in the wrong direction on the parkway and collided head-on with an oncoming SUV. Eight people were killed: Schuler, her daughter and three nieces, and the three occupants in the SUV. The crash was the worst fatal motor vehicle crash to occur in Westchester County since July 22, 1934, when a bus crash in Ossining claimed twenty lives.

The ensuing investigation into the crash's cause received nationwide media attention. Toxicology tests conducted by the medical examiner revealed that Schuler was heavily intoxicated with both alcohol and marijuana at the time of the crash. Her husband, Daniel Schuler, consistently denied that she used drugs or alcohol "excessively" and made multiple national media appearances to defend his late wife and call for further investigation into other possible medical causes for her erratic driving. An independent investigator hired by the Schuler family obtained DNA testing and toxicology re-testing of Schuler's samples, and confirmed the results of the original testing.

== Day of the incident ==
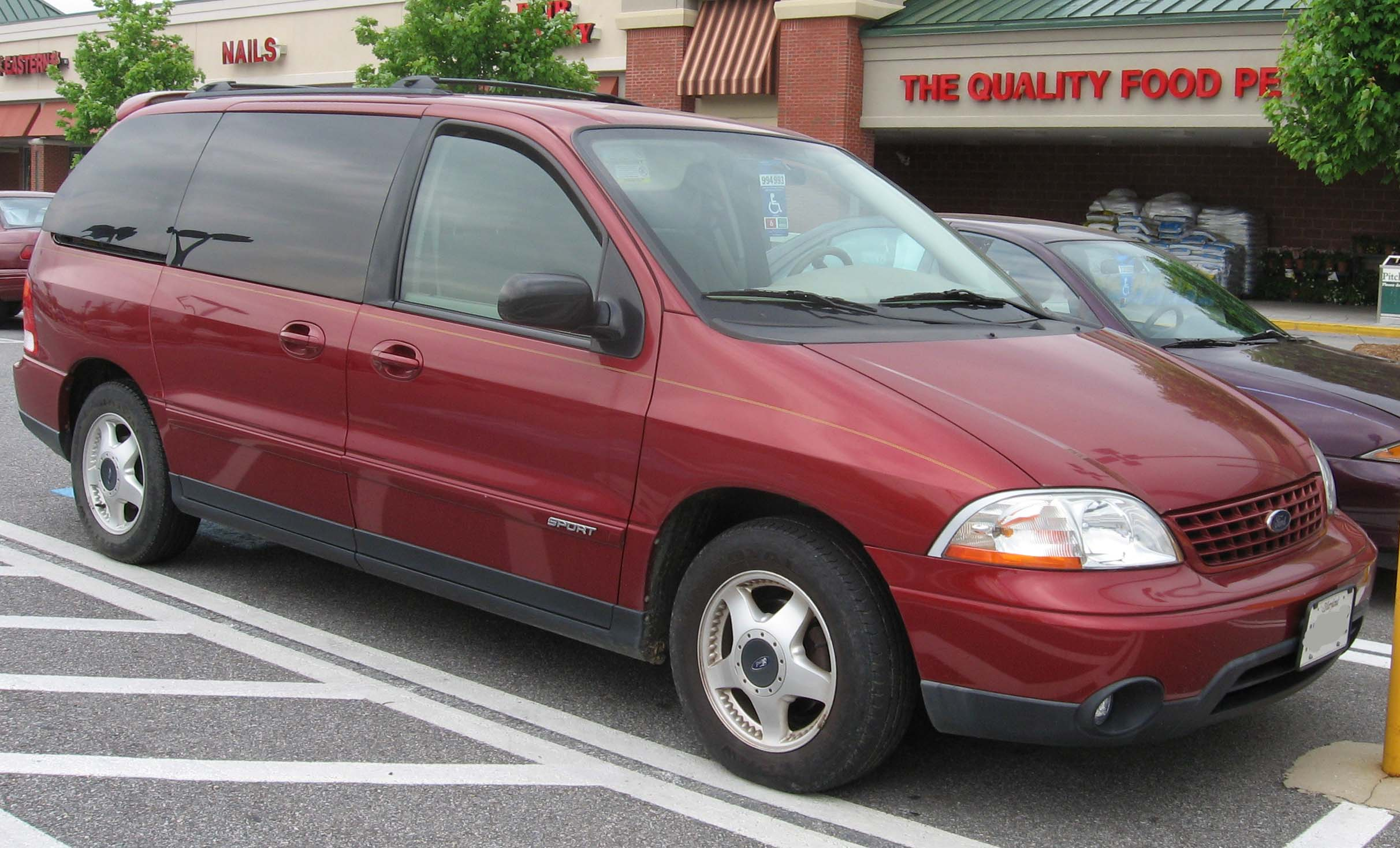
A red 2003 Ford Windstar, similar to the one Schuler was driving

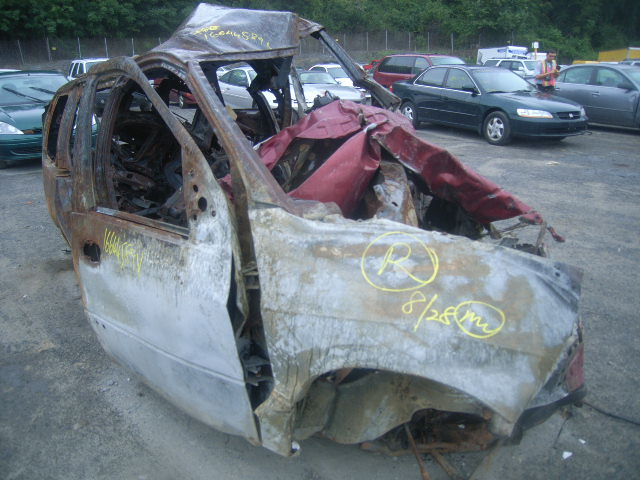
An auction photo of the Ford Windstar driven by Schuler taken a month after the crash

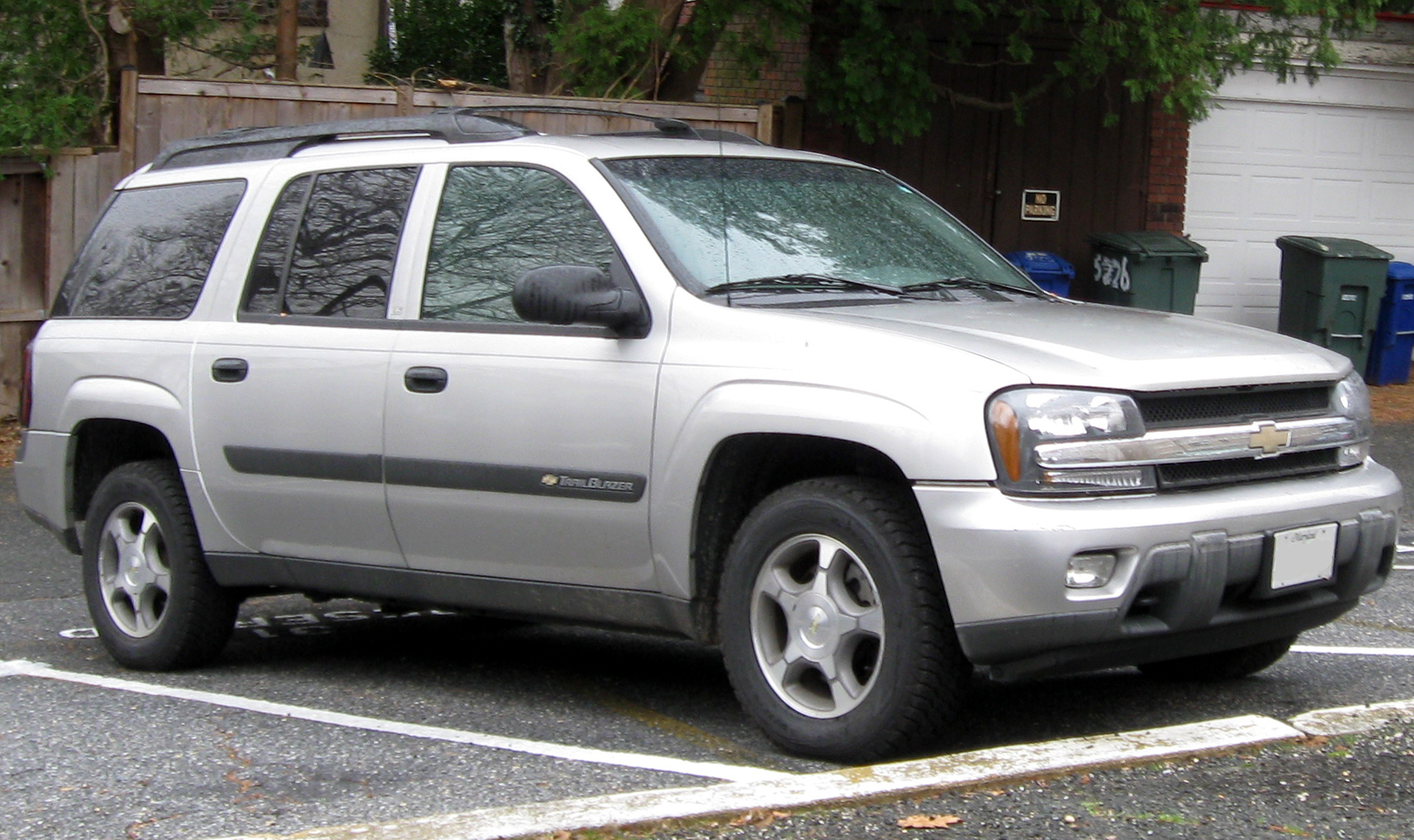
2004 Chevrolet TrailBlazer

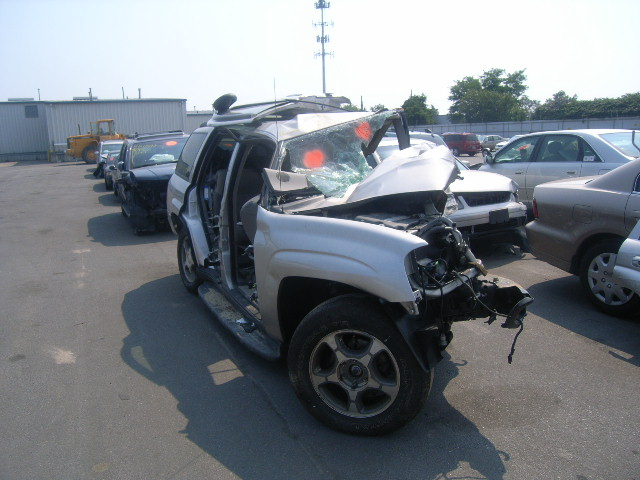
An auction photo of the Chevrolet Trailblazer hit by Schuler taken a month after the crash

At approximately 9:30 a.m. on Sunday, July 26, 2009, 36-year-old Diane Schuler left the Hunter Lake Campground in Parksville, New York, located in the Catskill Mountains, where the family kept their camping trailer. She was driving a red 2003 Ford Windstar, borrowed from her brother, Warren Hance. Also in the minivan with Schuler were her 5-year-old son and 2-year-old daughter, and her brother's three daughters, ages 8, 7, and 5. Her husband, Daniel Schuler, left the campground at the same time in a pickup truck and took the family dog with him. A co-owner of the campground later reported that Diane appeared sober when she departed.

On the way back to their home in West Babylon, on Long Island, Schuler stopped at a McDonald's restaurant and a Sunoco gas station in Liberty. Surveillance video lacking audio, recorded at the gas station, shows Schuler arriving at and leaving, and going inside the station's convenience store. Schuler’s husband, sister-in-law, and an investigator working on their behalf all made claims and/or inferences that Schuler had spoken to the clerk while attempting to buy over-the-counter pain-relief medication, although the gas station did not sell the one she wanted.

Schuler left Liberty just after 11 a.m., traveling along Route 17/Interstate 86 and the New York Thruway (Interstate 87), entering the Ramapo-Sloatsburg service area, and crossing the Tappan Zee Bridge heading east. Several witnesses later reported seeing a red minivan driving aggressively on Route 17/Interstate 86 and Interstate 87, including aggressively tailgating, flashing headlights, honking the horn, moving in and out of lanes, and straddling two lanes. At 11:37 a.m., Schuler called her brother from her minivan, reportedly telling him that they were being delayed by traffic. According to a police report, Schuler was seen by witnesses at approximately 11:45 a.m. by the side of the road with her hands on her knees, as if vomiting; she was seen again in the same position a short time later, north of the Ramapo-Sloatsburg rest stop.

At about 1 p.m., a call was made to Jackie Hance from Schuler's cell phone. During this call, Emma, Jackie's 8 year old daughter, told her mother that "something is wrong with Aunt Diane". Emma was crying, as well as her 7 year old sister, Alyson. Emma gave the phone to Diane, who told Jackie the girls were playing and being silly. Diane was slurring her words and incoherent. The call ended after 2.5 minutes. Warren Hance then called Schuler's phone and she told him she wasn't feeling well, she was disoriented and was having trouble seeing. Hance then spoke with Emma, and told her to read him any signs she could see. He then told Schuler to stay right there and he'd come get them. Police believe that the car was stopped in a pull-off area beyond the Tappan Zee Bridge tollbooths for at least part of this call. Hance reportedly told Schuler to stay off the road, while he came to meet them; follow-up calls from Hance to Schuler were not answered. At this point, she left her cell phone along the highway; it was found by another motorist by the side of the road near the tollbooths.

Investigators did not determine what route Schuler took from the bridge to the Taconic State Parkway ramps near Briarcliff Manor. At 1:33 p.m., two drivers called 9-1-1 after noticing her van edging onto the parkway's northbound exit ramp. The end of the exit ramp, at the intersection with Pleasantville Road, is marked with two signs that read "Do Not Enter" and two signs that read "Wrong Way". Within the next minute, four more 9-1-1 calls were placed by motorists who reported that a car was traveling the wrong way down the parkway, going approximately 80 miles per hour (130 km/h).

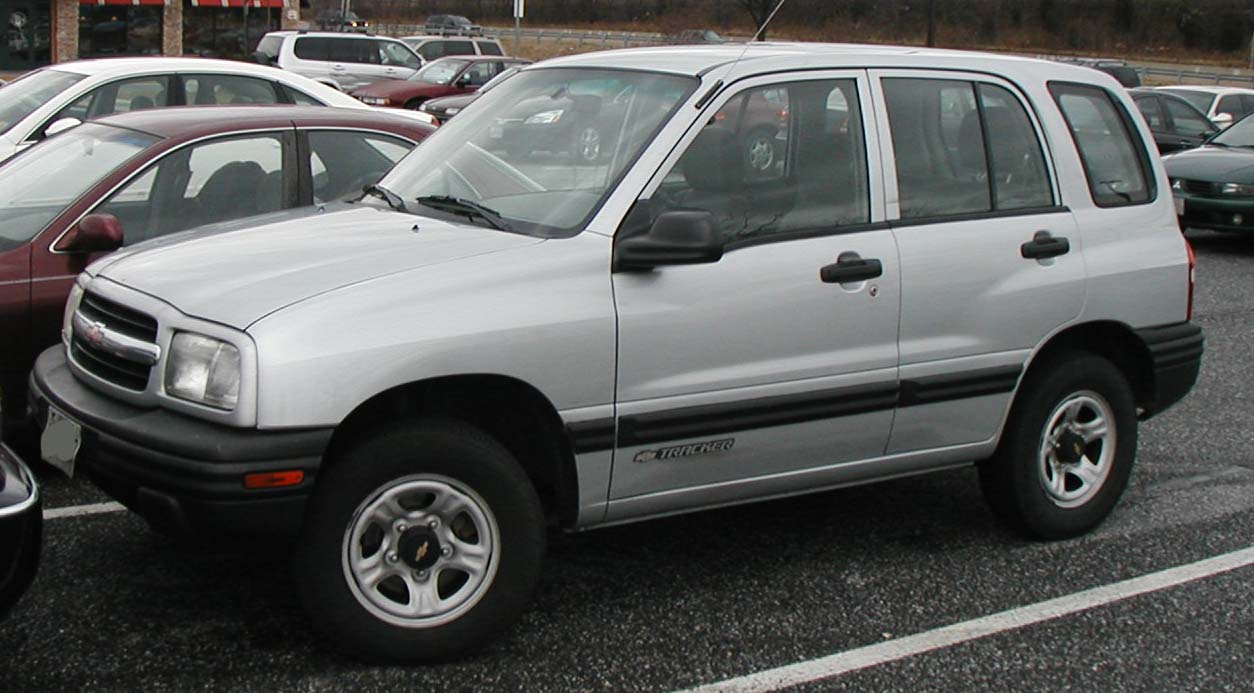
2002 Chevrolet Tracker

Schuler's minivan traveled south for 1.7 miles (2.7 km) in the parkway's northbound passing lane before colliding head-on, at approximately 1:35 p.m., with a 2004 Chevrolet TrailBlazer, which then struck a 2002 Chevrolet Tracker. At the time of impact, Schuler was traveling approximately 85 miles per hour (137 km/h).

Two men who witnessed the crash and saw smoke rising out of the minivan ran to assist the occupants. After removing Schuler from the vehicle, the two men saw a large, broken Absolut Vodka bottle by the driver's side. The men tried to pull the girls out of the minivan and noted that they had no pulse.

== Victims ==
Diane Schuler, her daughter Erin, and two of her nieces, Emma and Alyson Hance, died at the scene of the crash, along with the three men in the TrailBlazer: 81-year-old Michael Bastardi, his 49-year-old son Guy, and their friend, 74-year-old Dan Longo. The two occupants of the Tracker suffered only minor injuries. Schuler's severely injured 5-year-old niece Katie and her 5-year-old son Bryan were taken to area hospitals, where Katie died later that day. Bryan was the only passenger of Schuler's vehicle to survive, suffering from broken bones and severe head trauma. He remained hospitalized for several weeks before returning home in early October.

== Intoxication levels ==
A toxicology report released on August 4 by Westchester County medical examiners found that Schuler had a blood-alcohol content (BAC) of 0.19%, with approximately six grams of alcohol in her stomach that had not yet been absorbed into her blood. The legal BAC limit for driving while intoxicated in New York is 0.08%. The report also said that Schuler had high levels of THC, the primary psychoactive active ingredient in cannabis, in her system.

The incident drew nationwide attention as Schuler's husband, Daniel, strongly disagreed with the conclusion that she was heavily intoxicated at the time of the crash. In an August 8 press conference, Daniel and his attorney, Dominic Barbara, initially denied, given that several children had been with them, that Diane had taken any illegal drugs or was drinking that weekend at the campground. Daniel then changed his story, and consistently denied that his wife ever "drank to excess" or could have been drunk while driving at the time of the collision. When Larry King and Oprah Winfrey asked Daniel about the vodka bottle discovered in the minivan, he claimed that the couple always kept an "old" bottle in their camper. He further stated that Diane did all the packing for the camping trip and must have moved the bottle into the van.

Daniel eventually admitted that he and his wife had, in fact, consumed alcohol during the camping trip; he denied that Diane had had anything to drink on the day preceding the crash. The campground co-owner, who had gotten to know the Schulers well, had seen them off at approximately 9 a.m. that morning, and stated that Diane appeared to be sober. The gas station clerk whom Schuler asked for pain medication at around 11 a.m. also said, "[I knew] for a fact [that] she wasn't drunk when she came into the station." According to Tom Ruskin, a private investigator hired by Daniel's lawyers, none of the McDonald's employees had seen anything in Schuler's behavior to suggest that she was intoxicated. In fact, she had been observed carrying on an extended conversation while ordering her food and orange juice.

Ruskin told reporters in early September that he had interviewed Diane's relatives, none of whom had ever seen her intoxicated by alcohol. He also pointed to autopsy results that showed an absence of organ damage often found in chronic alcoholics, although an uninvolved medical examiner noted that such results cannot rule out alcohol abuse. Schuler's relatives have also disputed that Diane was known to drink heavily or irresponsibly.

Daniel denied that his wife took illegal drugs, but told investigators that she smoked marijuana "occasionally"; the family told People magazine that she used the drug to relieve insomnia. Although Daniel was an "officer" in the Public Security Unit of the Nassau County Police Department, he was not required to report his wife's drug use, as he was a civilian employee. In November, it was reported that Diane's sister-in-law had made a statement to police that Diane had, in fact, smoked marijuana on a regular basis.

Daniel and his attorney, Barbara, believed that Schuler was driving erratically due to a sudden medical emergency, such as a stroke. According to Barbara, she was obese for much of her life and suffered from diabetes, although additional sources cite Diane as having experienced gestational diabetes, an acute condition related to pregnancy, rather than a chronic condition. Barbara also mentioned an "abscess" that had persisted in Schuler's mouth for seven weeks prior to her death, and a lump in her leg, about which Schuler reportedly said, "[It] might have been an embolism". The results of an autopsy on the day following the crash, conducted by a Westchester County medical examiner, found that Diane had not suffered a stroke, an aneurysm, or a heart attack.

In September, a New York forensic pathologist noted that a hair test should have been carried out to determine Schuler's drug history. Daniel and Barbara announced plans to exhume her body in order to perform the hair test and other examinations; other experts said that this test was unlikely to produce any new information, as tests from two separate labs had come to identical conclusions. Daniel also intended to have the fluid samples from the autopsy re-tested. The Westchester County medical examiner's office, which had performed the autopsy, commented that the chemical degradation of the fluid samples over time was likely to result in lowered alcohol and THC readings; however, several toxicology experts responded that, if the fluid samples had been properly stored, the re-test results ought to be similar to the prior tests. On November 7, Ruskin announced that the Schuler family had raised enough money to re-test Diane's tissue samples, and that the re-testing would "soon" take place. In July 2010, it was reported that Daniel had accepted a $100,000 offer from a film company, Moxie Firecracker Films, to record his wife's exhumation for an HBO documentary. This money was, reportedly, to be placed in trust for Bryan.

Daniel's persistence in disputing his wife's intoxication and drug use was condemned by relatives of the three TrailBlazer victims. When he appeared on CNN's Larry King Live to demand more testing of his wife's remains, Longo's brother, Joseph, issued a statement saying, in part, "I want Daniel Schuler to know that he keeps inflicting more pain on all concerned once again [by] going to the media to try [to] paint a picture of a perfect wife and mother." Bastardi's daughters appeared with their lawyer on NBC's Today, during which they raised the question of Daniel's culpability in enabling his wife's substance abuse, and called for him to undergo drug testing himself. "It makes me angry that he keeps denying it," said Margaret Nicotina, Bastardi's daughter. "Every time he does it, he brings it back for us. I just wish that he would just admit that she was drunk. Maybe if he knows what happened that morning, if they argued or anything, that would be the truth. He wants the truth. So do we." Their lawyer called Daniel's position totally outrageous, an insult to the intelligence of the American public, and a hoax. In October 2009, Ruskin, on The Oprah Winfrey Show, stated that, out of respect for the Bastardi family, Daniel had been avoiding media appearances since Larry King Live.

In June 2010, following eleven months of analysis, the New York State Police issued its final report on the crash. The report upheld the previous toxicology findings that, at the time of the crash, Schuler was highly intoxicated by alcohol and had high levels of THC in her system.

== Legal action ==
According to the Westchester County medical examiner, the crash was ruled a homicide soon after it occurred because the victims were killed due to Schuler's negligent driving, regardless of toxicology findings. On August 18, Westchester County District Attorney Janet DiFiore said that no charges would be filed in the incident, because Schuler was the only person responsible for the deaths. "Diane Schuler died in the crash and the charges died with her," DiFiore said. In October 2009, DiFiore faced accusations from both Dan Schorr and a Bastardi family attorney that she had mishandled the Schuler case by neglecting to initiate a grand jury investigation into the crash. In response to Schorr's comments, DiFiore responded, "Is he suggesting that there was criminal evidence of a crime committed by someone and we wouldn't pursue it? That's just silly." DiFiore won re-election in November. The Bastardi family said that if DiFiore did not convene a grand jury, they would seek support in the matter from the state attorney general and the governor.

Following a request from the Bastardi family that an administrator be appointed for Schuler's estate so that a lawsuit could be filed, Daniel officially declined the role in November 2009, leaving it to a county-court judge to appoint a public administrator. On December 10, the Bastardi family filed suit against Schuler and her brother, Warren Hance, seeking unspecified damages for wanton, willful, and reckless conduct. According to the family's lawyers, they were required by state law to include Hance in the suit because he was the owner of the minivan.

In July 2011, Jackie Hance, who lost her three daughters in the crash, filed suit against Daniel, her brother-in-law. The suit claimed that the three deceased Hance girls suffered terror, fear of impending death, extreme horror, fright and mental anguish. On July 26, 2011, the day after the premiere of the HBO documentary and on the second anniversary of the crash, Daniel sued the state for not "keeping the road safe" and his brother-in-law Warren Hance as the owner of the minivan that Schuler was driving. By July 2014, all lawsuits by all parties were either settled or dropped.

== Child Passenger Protection Act ==
In August 2009, New York Governor David Paterson proposed the Child Passenger Protection Act, which would make it a felony to drive while intoxicated if a passenger under the age of 16 is in a vehicle. The proposal became known as Leandra's Law following the October 2009 death of 11-year-old Leandra Rosado, a passenger in a vehicle whose driver was drunk. The Child Passenger Protection Act was signed into state law on November 18, 2009.

== Media ==
In September 2009, the syndicated talk show Dr. Phil broadcast an episode about drunk-driving moms that focused heavily on Schuler and the crash. The next month, Oprah Winfrey devoted an episode of her show to the crash, interviewing Tom Ruskin via Skype, with Winfrey responding incredulously to several of his claims.

The Law & Order episode "Doped," which first aired in November 2009, centers on an extremely similar fictional crash. It features a woman who speeds down the West Side Highway in the wrong direction before crashing and killing herself, her daughter and her two nieces, and another family in another car. Bastardi relatives reacted with anger upon hearing that the NBC drama would be basing an episode on the real-life tragedy.

There's Something Wrong with Aunt Diane, directed by Liz Garbus for HBO Documentaries, establishes a timeline of events prior to the crash. The documentary suggests that Schuler could have been suffering from severe pain caused by a tooth abscess during the drive home, causing her to look for painkillers at the gas station and, upon failing to find any, self-medicating with drugs and alcohol. The pain of the abscess, combined with vodka and marijuana, could have put her in a temporary state of delirium that triggered her fatal behavior. In the documentary, Daniel and Barbara claim they gave Ruskin $30,000 to conduct an independent investigation and to re-test samples. Throughout the documentary, both Daniel and Jay Schuler, Diane's sister-in-law, claim that Ruskin would not return their phone calls for nine months. At the end of the documentary, over the phone, Ruskin states that he had called Jay months previously with the results and that she refused to pick up her phone. She is seen claiming that "she was told not to pick up" and "that she didn't understand any of it." Ruskin then informs her that his tests corroborated the previous tests; that Schuler was highly intoxicated from alcohol and marijuana. Schuler's family persisted in refusing to accept the test results.

Jackie Hance wrote a book called I'll See You Again in which the tragedy is revisited, focusing on her initial grief and later reemergence into life. Stephen King's short story "Herman Wouk is Still Alive" in his horror fiction anthology The Bazaar of Bad Dreams (2015) is, according to King, a story directly based on the Taconic State Parkway crash.

A 2021 episode of the television show 9-1-1 titled "Blindsided" partially features a very similar situation, as a drunk driver enters the Los Angeles 710 Freeway using the off-ramp, resulting in a pileup, although only one child is in the drunk driver's car and both the driver and child survive the crash.

== The Hance Family Foundation ==
Jackie and Warren Hance formed a foundation, the Hance Family Foundation, whose main purpose is to honor the lives of their three daughters by ensuring healthy, happy, and safe children through innovative self-esteem educational programming. The foundation's central project is Beautiful Me, a self-esteem program designed to educate girls by promoting appreciation for their genuine qualities, accurate self-awareness, and the satisfaction of helping others.

== See also ==
- Schoharie limousine crash
- List of traffic collisions (2000–present)
- Carrollton bus collision, similar 1988 crash in Kentucky involving intoxicated driver going the wrong way on a divided highway; killed 27.
