= Smart Start =

Smart Start may refer to:

- Smart Start (education), an American education program
- Smart Start, Inc., an American manufacturer of alcohol-monitoring technology
- Smart Start, a Kellogg's breakfast cereal
