= Intoxalock =

Ignition interlock device company

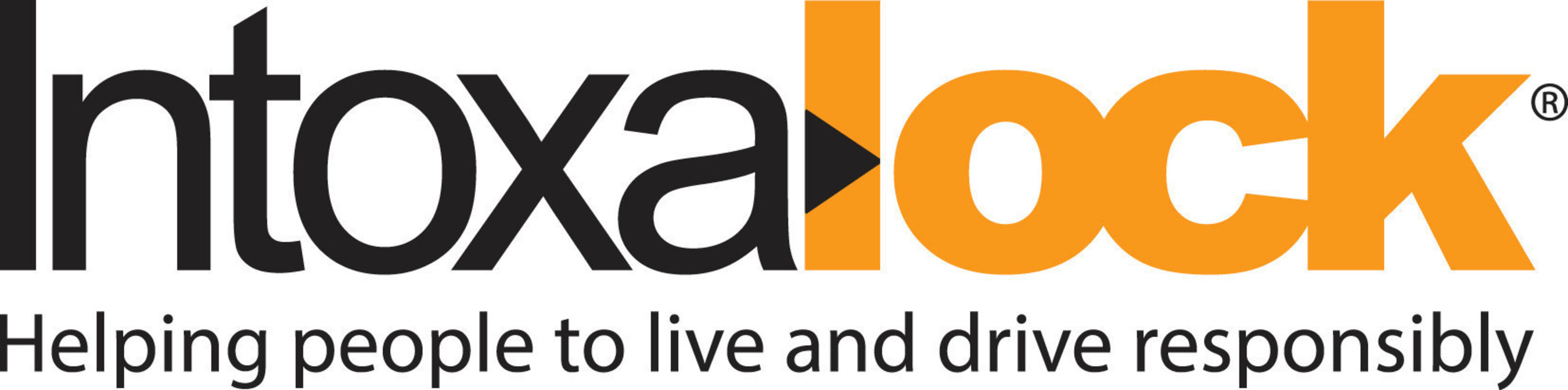
Company logo

Intoxalock is the primary trade name of Consumer Safety Technology, LLC, which developed technology used by breath alcohol ignition interlock devices (breathalyzers) installed in vehicles. They are based in Des Moines, Iowa, United States. The devices are meant to deter people from driving while intoxicated, and are often mandated by courts of law for people who have DUI or DWI offenses.

== History ==
Consumer Safety Technology, LLC. was started in 1988, with their first ignition interlock system using alcohol-specific fuel cell technology developed in 1992. They worked with Iowa State University engineers to develop this new technology. Intoxalock became registered in 2006 and in 2012, CST began officially doing business as Intoxalock.

Scot Lewton and Kevin Doyle were the original founders of Consumer Safety Technology, LLC. They sold the company to the private equity firm, ClearLight Partners LLC, in 2012. Kimberly Williams joined the company in 2014, and became the CEO.

Intoxalock is certified to install devices in 46 US states, and has devices being used in all 50 states. In 2013, Intoxalock began servicing customers in Washington directly. Washington was previously serviced by an independent distributor. Kentucky is the most recent state to pass ignition interlock laws in June 2015, with Intoxalock being one of the certified installers in the state.

From March 14 to March 28, 2026, Intoxalock installations and calibrations were interrupted by a cyberattack, causing some motorists to become stranded as period recalibration is required to prevent the system from locking the vehicle.

== Locations ==
Intoxalock partners with local automotive shops and certifies them as installers of their devices, in a de-centralized business model. Intoxalock has over 5,500 installation locations. Some states require ignition interlock devices to come equipped with a camera that takes a picture every time a sample is given. This verifies that the person giving the sample is the person driving the vehicle. Intoxalock provides camera verification with their eLERT devices. They can also provide GPS and real-time reporting for courts and probation officers.

== Device use ==
The hand-held Intoxalock device requires the driver of the vehicle to submit an "inhale, blow" breath sample into the device. After the device calculates the driver's blood alcohol content, the device displays a message telling the driver to start the vehicle. A series of "rolling retests" occur periodically as the vehicle is being driven, and breath samples are given with same process used to initially start the vehicle.
