= The Fourth Estate (TV series) =

- Created by: Liz Garbus
- Directed by: Liz Garbus
- Country of origin: United States
- Original language: English
- No. of episodes: 4

Production
- Running time: 243 minutes (in total)
- Production company: Moxie Firecracker Films

Original release
- Network: Showtime
- Release: May 27, 2018

The Fourth Estate is a four-part 2018 documentary television series about The New York Times' coverage of the White House directed by Liz Garbus. A 90-minute version was shown on April 28, 2018, at the Tribeca Film Festival and was released by Showtime a month later.

== Overview ==
The series combines running office footage with interviews of investigative reporters and their bosses as they go about their work. Its title comes from the common term "the Fourth Estate" for the press' role as independent watchdog keeping an eye on the government. The choice of title can be seen as an ironic comment to President Donald Trump's statement at the Conservative Political Action Conference on February 24, 2017, that much of the news media is "the enemy of the people": "A few days ago I called the fake news the enemy of the people and they are. They are the enemy of the people."

== Production ==
The opening sequence is scored by Trent Reznor and Atticus Ross, both of the band Nine Inch Nails; the series features variations of songs from Reznor's Ghosts I–IV.

== Release ==
A 90-minute version was shown on April 28, 2018, at the Tribeca Film Festival and was followed by a panel discussion with Dean Baquet, Elisabeth Bumiller, Julie Davis, Mark Mazzetti, Liz Garbus, and Jenny Carchman. The series was released by Showtime a month later.

== Episodes ==
No.	Title	Directed by	Written by	Original release date	US viewers (millions)
1	"First 100 Days"	Liz Garbus	Unknown	May 27, 2018	0.163
2	"The Trump Bump"	Jenny Carchman and Liz Garbus	Unknown	June 3, 2018	N/A
3	"American Carnage"	Jenny Carchman and Liz Garbus	Unknown	June 10, 2018	0.111
4	"Matters of Fact"	Jenny Carchman and Liz Garbus	Unknown	June 17, 2018	0.124
