= Love, Marilyn =

2012 American documentary film

- Theatrical release poster
- Directed by: Liz Garbus
- Screenplay by: Liz Garbus
- Based on: the book Fragments: Poems, Intimate Notes, Letters by editors: Stanley F. Buchthal; Bernard Comment
- Produced by: Stanley F. Buchthal; Liz Garbus; Amy Hobby
- Starring: Marilyn Monroe
- Cinematography: Maryse Alberti
- Edited by: Azin Samari
- Music by: Philip Sheppard
- Production companies: Diamond Girl; Sol's Luncheonette Production; StudioCanal
- Distributed by: Home Box Office; StudioCanal
- Release dates: September 12, 2012 (TIFF); October 12, 2012 (HIFF); June 17, 2013 (HBO)
- Running time: 107 minutes
- Countries: United States; France
- Language: English

Love, Marilyn is a 2012 American documentary film about American actress and sex symbol Marilyn Monroe's writings directed by Liz Garbus and produced by Stanley F. Buchthal, Garbus, and Amy Hobby. The film premiered at the Toronto International Film Festival on September 12, 2012 and is based on the 2010 non-fiction book Fragments: Poems, Intimate Notes, Letters, edited by Buchthal and Bernard Comment. The production firms that produced the film included the Diamond Girl production company, Sol's Luncheonette Production and the French-based StudioCanal production company, whose parent company (Canal+ Group) owns the third-largest film library in the world.

The film was initially slated to be named Fragments, but was later changed to Love, Marilyn.

== Synopsis ==
50 years after her death, two boxes of Marilyn Monroe's writings—diaries, poems and letters—were discovered in the home of Lee Strasberg, her acting coach. The film features dramatic readings of Monroe's writings by actors, film critics, journalists and authors; and archival footage of Hollywood insiders who knew her or worked with her in various films or acting school.

== Interviews ==
=== Authors and film critics - present day ===
- Patricia Bosworth
- Sarah Churchwell
- Lois Banner
- Molly Haskell
- Donald Spoto
- Thomas Schatz

=== Archival - first-person primary source coverage ===
- Rupert Allen (publicist)
- Eve Arnold
- Lauren Bacall
- George Barris
- Walter Bernstein
- Truman Capote
- Collin Clark
- Ben Gazzara
- John Huston
- Peter Lawford
- Jack Lemmon
- Joshua Logan
- Ben Lyon
- Norman Mailer
- Richard Meryman
- Arthur Miller
- Marilyn Monroe
- Edward R. Murrow
- Jean Negulesco
- Laurence Olivier
- Norman Rosten
- Jane Russell
- Gloria Steinem
- Lee Strasberg
- Paula Strasberg
- Susan Strasberg
- Eli Wallach
- Billy Wilder

=== Actors and others - present day ===
- F. Murray Abraham
- Elizabeth Banks
- Adrien Brody
- Ellen Burstyn
- Glenn Close
- Hope Davis
- Viola Davis
- Jennifer Ehle
- Ben Foster
- Paul Giamatti
- Amy Greene
- Jack Huston
- Stephen Lang
- Lindsay Lohan
- Janet McTeer
- Gretchen Mol
- Jeremy Piven
- Oliver Platt
- Zoe Saldaña
- Vinessa Shaw
- David Strathairn
- Amber Tamblyn
- Lili Taylor
- Uma Thurman
- Marisa Tomei
- Evan Rachel Wood

== Reception ==
On the review aggregator website Rotten Tomatoes, 65% of 23 critics' reviews are positive. The website's consensus reads: "It's difficult to see between the lines in this popcorn-style reading of the icon's journals, but what talented voice-over provides in novelty, Love, Marilyn detracts with basic frivolity." Metacritic, which uses a weighted average, assigned the film a score of 51 out of 100, based on 10 critics, indicating "mixed or average" reviews.

Entertainment Weekly, in its "The Must List: The Top 10 Things We Love This Week" section", picked Love, Marilyn as one of its selections the week of June 28, 2013, Volume #1265. The EW staff wrote, "The iconic star takes center stage in a revelatory HBO documentary that combines old footage and a slew of interviews with such actors as Viola Davis and Glenn Close. Catch it now on VOD or with the HBO Go app."

Matthew Gilbert, film critic with The Boston Globe reviewed the film positively, writing, "But yes, more Marilyn is just what we need, when the project is as exquisitely done as Love, Marilyn. The new HBO documentary, which premieres Monday at 9 p.m., is an elegant pastiche based on the boxes of Monroe’s own writings that were discovered a few years ago. It’s not a traditional biographical film of the American Masters variety, because director Liz Garbus doesn’t attempt to be all-inclusive or to impose chronology onto the material ... Garbus adeptly patches together fragments of a life narrated, in a way, by Monroe herself. She inventively pieces together an impressionistic, revealing, and ultimately moving version of the story that so many of us know already."

Sara Stewart, liked the film as well and wrote in The New York Post, "It's hard to imagine that absolutely everything hasn’t already been said about Marilyn Monroe. But for all the books and movies and tributes and myth-making, the iconic blonde has never had much of a chance to speak for herself...But the writings are the film’s reason for existing, and they are fascinating. Ranging from hastily scribbled jottings to lengthy letters to her acting coach Lee Strasberg, the handwritten notes add a refreshing complexity to a persona that’s been simplified over time into a two-dimensional, if ever-enduring, sex symbol."

American gossip columnist Liz Smith, writing for the New York Social Diary, discussed the actors that appeared in the film, "It is the female stars Ms. Garbus lured that lift the film. Among them: Glenn Close, Ellen Burstyn, Lili Taylor, Uma Thurman, Evan Rachel Wood, Lindsay Lohan and the magnificent Viola Davis. It is the women who recite Marilyn’s own words — alternately scattered, precise, desperate, hopeful. There’s not a false note anywhere. Every woman seems deeply affected. As Garbus said, 'Marilyn speaks to every woman's inner self — love, family, the desire for perfection, satisfaction in her work. And the fears that she cannot 'have it all.' Sarah Churchwell, who wrote the best book on Monroe, The Many Lives of Marilyn Monroe, also makes an important contribution."

The television critic for the Los Angeles Times, Mary McNamara, discussed the "seductive power of theater", writing, "Yet for all the hope pinned on internal illumination, the first thing Love, Marilyn does is remind us how beautiful Monroe really was. Her face has been so thoroughly replaced in popular culture by commercialized replications that the real thing is a surprising thrill to behold. The film also reinforces the seductive power of theater. Having performers read Monroe's journal entries renders these often quite mundane sentences powerful and possibly revelatory. Through these women, Monroe becomes the serious actor she longed to be."

Still, there were some misgivings in the media regarding the film. Dennis Harvey, writing for Variety wrote, "And while there’s no question Garbus has recruited first-rate talent to pay homage here, some of the most impressive names prove heavy-handed or simply miscast in attempting to channel the love goddess’s fragile spirit; moreover, having them act against green-screened archival materials has a tacky, pop-up televisual feel ... It's all entertaining, and will doubtless fascinate the subject's many die-hard fans. But the revelatory quality that attended some of Garbus' prior docus, on topics from Bobby Fischer to modern incarceration, is absent from what ultimately feels like one more unnecessary excavation of perhaps the 20th century’s least resting-in-peace sex symbol."

== Exhibition ==
The film opened at the Toronto International Film Festival on September 12, 2012. The film was first televised on HBO on Monday, June 17, 2013.

== Film festivals ==
- Belgrade Film Festival
- Glasgow Film Festival
- Hamptons International Film Festival
- Montclair Film Festival
- Palm Springs International Film Festival
- Portland International Film Festival
- Stockholm International Film Festival
- Telluride Film Festival
- Toronto International Film Festival

== See also ==
- Marilyn Monroe in popular culture
