= Emily Wachtel =

American producer, screenwriter, and actress

- Occupations: Producer; writer; actress
- Years active: 1991–present

Emily Wachtel is a producer, screenwriter, and actress. She originated and produced The Last Movie Stars (2022), a six-part documentary film, which chronicles the lives and careers of Paul Newman and Joanne Woodward. The film was directed by Ethan Hawke and executive produced by Martin Scorsese. Wachtel also co-wrote, produced, and acted in the semi-autobiographical film Lucky Them (2013), starring Toni Collette, Thomas Haden Church, Johnny Depp, and Oliver Platt.

== Life and career ==
Wachtel used her author's pseudonym, Ellie Klug, as the name of her main character in Lucky Them, as well as her own experience in music and dating scenes. Her pseudonym appeared in several publications and for a column in the "Fairfield Weekly." The indie film premiered at the 2013 Toronto International Film Festival to positive reviews from outlets such as Variety, The Huffington Post, Screen Daily, and The Hollywood Reporter.

Wachtel executive produced the documentary, Shepard and Dark, on playwright, actor, and director Sam Shepard, which was featured at the Cannes International Film Festival in May 2013.

In 2016, Wachtel produced a music video of the song "Let Me Be Your Girl" for singer songwriter Rachael Yamagata, which was directed by Josh Radnor, and starred actress Allison Janney.

Wachtel serves on the board of the Greenwich International Film Festival, which hosted a June 2014 "hometown premiere" of Lucky Them in her hometown of Stamford, Connecticut.

Wachtel serves on the international Board of Governors for SeriousFun Children's Network, a non-profit consisting of Paul Newman's camps for children with cancer and other blood-related diseases.

== Filmography ==
Year	Title	Role	Notes
1991	Regarding Henry	Nurse Gloria	Film
1993	Blind Spot	Phyllis	TV film
1995	Fall Time	Hairdresser	Film
1999	Felicity	Suzanne	1 episode
2000	Where the Money Is	Waitress	Film
2001-2002	Alias	Worker/Beth at airline counter	2 episodes
2005	Empire Falls	Bartender	TV film
2012	Gayby	Sconce Customer	Film
2013	Lucky Them	Charity Rocks	Film; also producer and screenwriter
2017	We Don't Belong Here	Mrs C.	Film
2022	The Last Movie Stars	Herself ("Chapter Six: Luck is an Art")	Film; also producer and originator
2024	1-800-On-Her-Own	—N/a	Film; producer
