= Judy Blume Forever =

- Release poster
- Directed by: Davina Pardo; Leah Wolchok
- Produced by: Sara Bernstein; Davina Pardo; Marcella Steingart; Justin Wilkes; Leah Wolchok
- Starring: Judy Blume
- Cinematography: Jenni Morello; Emily Topper
- Edited by: Tal Ben-David
- Music by: Lauren Culjak
- Production company: Imagine Documentaries
- Distributed by: Amazon Studios
- Release dates: January 21, 2023 (Sundance); April 21, 2023 (United States)
- Running time: 97 minutes
- Country: United States
- Language: English

Judy Blume Forever is a 2023 American documentary film centered on author Judy Blume, directed by Davina Pardo and Leah Wolchok. It premiered at the 2023 Sundance Film Festival, and was released on Prime Video on April 21, 2023. The film won a 2023 Peabody Award for "lovingly sketching a feminist coming-of-age tale of this esteemed author and her readers alike, and for wrapping it up in a rallying cry in support of the power of reading."

== Summary ==
The documentary covers the life, career, and legacy of Judy Blume, including her experiences with some of her books being banned, and the current state of free speech in the United States. It documents her trajectory from her upbringing in New Jersey to suburban housewife to famous novelist of young adult fiction. It includes new interviews with Blume, as well as past talk show appearances, archival photographs, and testimonials about Blume's impact from actors Lena Dunham, Molly Ringwald, and Anna Konkle, comedian Samantha Bee, authors Mary H.K. Choi and Jacqueline Woodson, Blume's two children, and adult women who corresponded with Blume when they were teens.

== Cast ==
- Judy Blume
- Lena Dunham
- Anna Konkle
- Molly Ringwald
- Samantha Bee
- Mary H.K. Choi
- Jacqueline Woodson
- Alex Gino

== Production ==
While on a road trip with her husband and kids, Davina Pardo listened to an audiobook version of Judy Blume's young adult novel Tales of a Fourth Grade Nothing, and became curious about Blume's life. When directors Pardo and Leah Wolchok approached Blume in June 2018 about being the subject of a documentary, she was initially hesitant. In February 2020, she agreed, but filming was delayed due to the COVID-19 pandemic.

== Release ==
The film premiered at the Sundance Film Festival on January 21, 2023. It was released on Prime Video on April 21, 2023.

== Reception ==
On the review aggregator website Rotten Tomatoes, 95% of 59 critics' reviews are positive, with an average rating of 7.8/10. The website's consensus reads: "An entertaining look back at an influential author's career, Judy Blume Forever lovingly contextualizes her literary legacy." Metacritic, which uses a weighted average, assigned the film a score of 79 out of 100, based on 16 critics, indicating "generally favorable" reviews.

Kate Erbland of Indiewire gave the film a B+, writing that it provides "an edifying and rich overview of everything Judy." Guy Lodge of Variety called it "a lively, affectionate documentary tribute" in which "nostalgia for that sense of formative discovery is balanced by a present-tense exploration of Blume’s enduring popularity, resonance and controversy." Tim Grierson of Screen Daily called Blume "fun company" who "comes across as a warm, generous spirit."

Judy Blume Forever won a 2023 Peabody Award.
