= Yo soy Boricua, pa'que tu lo sepas! (film) =

2006 film by Liz Garbus

Yo soy Boricua, pa'que tú lo sepas! (I'm Puerto Rican, Just So You Know!)
- Film poster
- Directed by: Liz Garbus, Rosie Perez
- Written by: Roger M. Sherman
- Release date: March 7, 2006 (United States)

Yo soy Boricua, pa'que tú lo sepas! is a documentary film co-directed by Liz Garbus and Rosie Perez, in which Perez explores Puerto Rican culture and history, from New York City's Puerto Rican Day Parade to a broader examination of Puerto Rico's past.

== See also ==
- Yo soy Boricua, pa'que tu lo sepas! (song)
