= Leandra's Law =

New York State law on drunk driving

Leandra's Law (Child Passenger Protection Act) is a New York State law making it an automatic felony on the first offense to drive drunk with a person age 15 or younger inside the vehicle, and setting the blood alcohol content, or BAC, at 0.08. The bill was unanimously passed by the New York State Assembly and the New York State Senate and then signed into law by Governor David Paterson on November 18, 2009.

== Background ==
Leandra Rosado, an 11-year-old girl, was killed on the Henry Hudson Parkway in New York City on October 11, 2009 when her friend's mother, Carmen Huertas, lost control of the car they were in while under the influence of alcohol. The car, driving 68 miles per hour in a 50 mile per hour zone, flipped over on the highway Six other children were also injured during the incident. Huertas pled guilty to all charges filed against her and was sentenced to four to twelve years in prison on October 29, 2010.

== The law ==
Pursuant to New York Vehicle Traffic Law Section 1192 2-a(b), any person operating a motor vehicle while intoxicated and transporting a child is guilty of a Class E Felony. In the event that reckless driving and death or serious physical injury is a factor, an individual is guilty of a class D felony. Defendants convicted under the new law face a prison sentence of up to four years and a fine of $1000–$5000. The installation of a mandatory ignition interlock device for a term of at least six months is also an expected provision of sentencing (mandatory for all DWI offenses committed after August 15, 2010). Moreover, licenses are automatically suspended pending prosecution and once proven guilty, the person will be reported to the Statewide Central Register of Child Abuse and Maltreatment and his/her license will be suspended for a minimum of twelve months. First time and repeat offenders are charged with an E level felony, regardless of criminal record.

== See also ==
- 2009 Taconic State Parkway crash
- Alcohol laws of New York
- Ignition interlock device
