= Who Killed Garrett Phillips? =

- Genre: Documentary, True crime
- Directed by: Liz Garbus
- Country of origin: United States
- Original language: English
- No. of episodes: 2

Production
- Producers: Liz Garbus, Nancy Abraham, Sheila Nevins, Kimberly Launier
- Cinematography: Tony Hardmon
- Editor: Karen K.H. Sim
- Running time: 120 minutes
- Production company: HBO Documentary Films

Original release
- Network: HBO
- Release: July 23 – July 24, 2019

Who Killed Garrett Phillips? is a 2019 two-part documentary directed by American filmmaker Liz Garbus. It delves into the 2011 murder of 12-year-old Garrett Phillips in Potsdam, New York, and the subsequent investigation and trial of Oral "Nick" Hillary, a Jamaican man and ex-boyfriend of Garrett's mother, Tandy Cyrus. The documentary examines the complexities of the case, highlighting issues of racial bias and prosecutorial misconduct.

== Synopsis ==
On October 24, 2011, Garrett Phillips was found murdered in his home in Potsdam, a small town in upstate New York. The police quickly focused on Oral "Nick" Hillary, a Jamaican man who was a soccer coach at Clarkson University and the ex-boyfriend of Garrett's mother. The documentary chronicles the years following the murder, including Hillary's interrogation, arrest, and trial for second-degree murder. He opted for a bench trial and was ultimately acquitted. During the trial, it was revealed that public state prosecutor Mary E. Rain withheld exculpatory evidence from the defense. This, along with other instances of professional misconduct, led to Rain being banned for two years from practicing law.

== Reception ==
The film premiered on June 20, 2019, at the AFI Docs Film Festival in Washington, D.C., as part of the festival's "Truth and Justice" program. It was subsequently broadcast on July 23 and 24, 2019, on HBO in the United States. The documentary received positive reviews.

=== Ratings and Reviews ===
Source	Rating/Review Summary
Rotten Tomatoes	Audience reviews are generally positive, with viewers praising the documentary's in-depth exploration of the case.
RogerEbert.com	Critic Brian Tallerico commended the documentary for its detailed examination of the case and its focus on the rush to judgment, highlighting issues of racism and incompetence in the small-town justice system.
Metacritic	The documentary holds a Metascore of 84, indicating generally favorable reviews from critics.
