= 1-800-On-Her-Own =

- Film poster
- Directed by: Dana Flor
- Produced by: Amy Hobby; Emily Wachtel
- Edited by: Kristina Motwani
- Production companies: Record Breaker Films; Tortyfly Pictures
- Release date: June 10, 2024 (Tribeca Festival)
- Running time: 77 minutes
- Country: United States
- Language: English

1-800-On-Her-Own is a 2024 American documentary film about the life and career of singer-songwriter Ani DiFranco. It is directed by Dana Flor.

== Reception ==
Robyn Bahr of The Hollywood Reporter wrote, "You know you're wasting time on a documentary when you feel the urge to Wikipedia its subject while you're in the middle of watching an entire feature film devoted to them. And once I had finished Dana Flor's tedious music biodoc 1-800-ON-HER-OWN, I oddly felt like I knew even less about folk-rock legend Ani DiFranco than I did going into it."

Andrew Parker of TheGATE.ca gave the film a score of 5 out of 10, writing, "[O]utside of a handful of illuminating moments, 1-800-On-Her-Own is a thin documentary. There's not much of a beginning or end, a minimal amount of context, and only a small handful of voices speaking about the DiFranco and the influence she has undoubtedly had on folk music and other artists."
