= What Happened, Miss Simone? =

2015 biographical documentary film directed by Liz Garbus

- Theatrical release poster
- Directed by: Liz Garbus
- Produced by: Liz Garbus; Amy Hobby; Jayson Jackson; Justin Wilkes
- Cinematography: Igor Martinovic
- Edited by: Joshua L. Pearson
- Distributed by: Netflix
- Release dates: January 22, 2015 (Sundance); June 26, 2015 (Netflix)
- Running time: 101 minutes
- Country: United States
- Language: English

What Happened, Miss Simone? is a 2015 American biographical documentary film about Nina Simone directed by Liz Garbus. The film opened the 2015 Sundance Film Festival. The screening was followed by a tribute performance by John Legend. The film was released by Netflix on June 26, 2015. It was nominated for Best Documentary Feature at the 88th Academy Awards.

== Premise ==
The documentary chronicles the life of American singer Nina Simone, who became a civil rights activist and moved to Liberia following the turbulence of the 1960s. The documentary combines previously unreleased archival footage and interviews with Simone's daughter and friends. The title of the film was taken from a Maya Angelou quote.

== Production ==
Garbus was approached with the idea and rights for the film by RadicalMedia. Nina's daughter Lisa Simone Kelly served as the film's executive producer along with Sidney Beaumont, Adam Del Deo, and Jon Kamen.

== Reception ==
=== Critical response ===
On Rotten Tomatoes, the film has an approval rating of 90%, based on 51 reviews, with an average rating of 7.90/10. The website's critical consensus states, "What Happened, Miss Simone? is a compelling -- albeit necessarily incomplete -- overview of its complex subject's singular artistic legacy and fascinating life". On Metacritic, it has a score of 75 out of 100, based on reviews from 12 critics, indicating "generally favorable" reviews.

Anisha Jhaveri of IndieWire gave the film a B grade. Michael Hogan wrote for Vanity Fair that, "The risk of making a documentary of a towering artist is that, by explaining her, you only end up diminishing her. Not Nina Simone—not this time. In Liz Garbus's telling, Simone's talent and personality shine through, as gloriously singular, and uncontrollable, as ever."

Manohla Dargis of The New York Times cited the film's relevance, calling it an "often electric, bracingly urgent documentary."

=== Awards ===
The film was selected as one of 15 shortlisted for the Academy Award for Best Documentary Feature. It eventually received a nomination.

The film was nominated for the aforementioned Academy Award for Best Documentary Feature, but also six Primetime Emmy Awards, including Outstanding Documentary or Nonfiction Special and Outstanding Directing for a Nonfiction Program, winning the former. The film was also awarded a 2015 Peabody Award, presented at the 2016 award ceremony.

== See also ==
- 2015 in film
- Nina, a 2016 biopic starring Zoe Saldaña
