= Greenwich International Film Festival =

Film festival in Connecticut, US

- Location: Greenwich, Connecticut
- Festival date: April 30 – May 3, 2020
- Language: International

The Greenwich International Film Festival (or GIFF) is a non-profit organization that celebrates the visual arts in Greenwich, CT, with an annual film festival in June and supporting events throughout the year. The Festival, located in downtown Greenwich, features film screenings, premieres, events and parties showcasing filmmakers, panel discussions, and an award ceremony. The Festival focuses on "socially conscious" films, acting in partnership with nonprofits.

The four-day Festival features 60+ domestic and international film premieres and screenings educational panels and workshops,

The inaugural Festival took place from June 4–7, 2015, and multiple events were hosted prior to that date, beginning with a March 2, 2014 launch party covering the 86th Academy Awards. In addition to the annual Festival, GIFF hosts year-round screenings of socially conscious films.

== History ==
=== Before the Inaugural Festival ===
The Greenwich International Film Festival was first envisioned by Wendy Stapleton Reyes, Carina Crain and Colleen deVeer, three friends and Greenwich locals involved in the area's non-profit industry. Planning for the festival began in early 2013, as according to Reyes, the founders "wanted about a two-and-a-half year cushion going in to the inaugural festival."

The Festival's first official event was an Oscar-viewing launch party in March 2014, which was followed by the June 2014 hometown premiere screening of Lucky Them in Stamford, Connecticut, hometown of the film's producer and co-writer Emily Wachtel. On October 22, 2014, GIFF hosted a screening of The Good Lie, in collaboration with and benefitting the U.S. Fund for UNICEF, a drama film on the subject of the Lost Boys of Sudan, orphaned during the Second Sudanese Civil War.

=== Inaugural Festival – 2015 ===
The inaugural Greenwich International Film Festival took place June 4 to 7, 2015. The Festival's charitable and socially conscious mission led it to donate a portion of proceeds to the U.S. Fund for UNICEF, helping to support the OneminutesJr campaign, which equips young filmmakers with the resources to create one-minute short films, and showcases their work.

Over 7,500 celebrities, filmmakers, journalists, financial executives, and movie lovers attended the Festival which featured 31 domestic and international films, educational panels that were free to the public, a Children's Acting Workshop, Q&A's, parties, and evening events. Harry Belafonte and Mia Farrow were honored as the first-ever Changemakers in Film at the Changemaker Honoree Gala on June 6, 2015. The event was held at L’Escale restaurant in Greenwich. Kathie Lee Gifford and Regis Philbin presented the awards and served as Masters of Ceremony for the award ceremony. On the last night of the Festival, Nadezhda Tolokonnikova and Maria Alyokhina of Pussy Riot led a discussion on activism moderated by anti-corruption author Zephyr Teachout.

=== Second and Third Annual Festival – 2016 and 2017 ===
In 2016, Reena Ninan was a media panelist for a discussion of women in power in the media at the Greenwich International Film Festival.

Events leading up to the second annual festival including screening of the films Spotlight, The Big Short, and The Revenant. The advance screening of The Big Short, co-sponsored by GIFF Board Member Mark Teixeira, included a post-film panel featuring three of the men that inspired roles in the film.

In early January, GIFF presented the CT premiere of the Showtime series Billions. The screening of the pilot episode featured a post-screening panel moderated by David Edelstein of New York Magazine, and featured GIFF Board Member and co-creator David Levien, co-creator Brian Koppelman, director of the pilot episode Neil Burger, and actors David Costabile and Terry Kinney.

The 2016 Festival was scheduled for June 9–12.

In 2017, the festival was held for the third time. Jenna Bush Hager by then was a board member of GIFF.

== Impact ==
The Festival donates a portion of proceeds to nonprofit organizations, with a partnership announced in August 2014 with UNICEF and the One Minute Foundation on the OneminutesJr campaign, which equips young filmmakers with the resources to create one-minute short films, and showcases their work. The selection of UNICEF as the Festival's first beneficiary organization was made to support efforts to "build a model that made the most of those connections to benefit both individual filmmakers and a charity everyone believed in."

The Greenwich International Film Festival offers a number of awards and cash prizes, including an award for the Best Social Impact Film, which is a focus of the Festival. Awards include $10,000 cash prizes for Best Social Impact Film, Best Narrative Feature, and Best Documentary Feature, and $2,500 cash prized for Best Narrative Short and Best Documentary Short.

== Notable films ==
GIFF primarily showcases narrative and documentary features and short films. Recent premieres and award-winning films shown at GIFF include: Entourage, All Things Must Pass, Jane Wants A Boyfriend (World Premiere), I Smile Back, The Keeping Room, The Overnight, Time Out of Mind, Mania Days, 7 Minutes, 40-Love, Night Owls, Uncle John, Victoria, WildLike, Zurich, 3 ½ Minutes, 10 Bullets, Landfill Harmonic, The Russian Woodpecker, Tiger Tiger, Václav Havel: Living in Freedom (U.S. Premiere), Dirty Laundry Day, I’ve Just Had a Dream, Coaching Colburn, Santa Cruz del Islote, Shipwreck, The Summer of Sangailé, and Grounded.

== Board of directors ==
Board of Directors

- Carina Crain
- Colleen deVeer
- Susan Smith Ellis
- Julie Fareri
- Avram Ludwig
- Jim Matthews
- Gianna Palminteri
- Clay Pecorin
- Wendy Stapleton Reyes
- Christian Simonds
- Ginger Stickel
- Mark Teixeira
- Carolyn Westerberg

Executive Board

- Richard Brener
- Jenna Bush Hager
- Jim Cabrera
- Kimberly Clarke
- David Duchovny
- Doug Ellin
- Dennis Ever
- Bobby Friedman
- Craig Gering
- Kathie Lee Gifford
- Jared Ian Goldman
- Colin Hanks
- Don Inner
- Michael Imperioli
- David Levien
- Clea Newman
- Chazz Palminteri
- Daphne Richards
- Deborah Royce
- Tom Scott
- Bill Shipsey
- Adrienne Stern
- Jeb Stuart
- Emily Wachtel
- Ali Wolfe
