= There's Something Wrong with Aunt Diane =

2011 American documentary

- Film poster
- Directed by: Liz Garbus
- Music by: Jonathan Zalben
- Country of origin: United States
- Original language: English

Production
- Producers: Julie Gaither; Liz Garbus
- Cinematography: Michael Tucker
- Editors: M. Watanabe Milmore; Charles Olivier
- Running time: 100 minutes

Original release
- Network: HBO
- Release: July 25, 2011

There's Something Wrong with Aunt Diane is a 2011 documentary television film directed by Liz Garbus about the 2009 Taconic State Parkway crash. It premiered on HBO on July 25, 2011.

== Premise ==
The film profiles Diane Schuler, who caused the fatal car accident, through interviews with her family members and friends, and attempts to piece together Schuler's actions on the day of the accident, in order to determine why the accident took place. The primary interviewees are Schuler's husband, Daniel, and sister-in-law, Jay, who are convinced that the toxicology report showing Schuler's high level of alcohol and THC intoxication was inaccurate, or that Schuler did not knowingly consume the intoxicants.
