= The Last Movie Stars =

2022 documentary series directed by Ethan Hawke

- Promotional poster
- Genre: Docuseries
- Created by: Emily Wachtel
- Written by: Stewart Stern
- Directed by: Ethan Hawke
- Starring: Joanne Woodward; Paul Newman; Laura Linney; George Clooney; Martin Scorsese; Sally Field; Karen Allen; Zoe Kazan
- Music by: Hamilton Leithauser
- Country of origin: United States
- Original language: English
- No. of seasons: 1
- No. of episodes: 6

Production
- Executive producers: Martin Scorsese; Courtney Sexton; Amy Entelis
- Editor: Barry Poltermann
- Production companies: Nook House; Under The Influence; CNN Films

Original release
- Network: HBO Max
- Release: July 21, 2022

The Last Movie Stars is an American documentary television miniseries created by Emily Wachtel and directed by Ethan Hawke. All six episodes of the series were released on HBO Max on July 21, 2022. After discovering transcripts of interviews conducted at Paul Newman's request for an abandoned memoir project, a daughter of Newman and Joanne Woodward asked Hawke to tell their story, personally and as artists. Hawke assembled actors to read pieces of the interviews, conducted and edited by writer Stewart Stern, including interviews with Newman and Woodward. The marriage spanned 50 years and was often cited as one of the great Hollywood successful marriages and love stories.

The series takes an unusual approach to telling Newman and Woodward's story, unfolding decades of material and dramatizing interview transcriptions to create a narrative around their relationship and evolving acting careers. Hawke described their influence in shifting acting styles to a more nuanced and natural approach: "Their generation changed American acting. What happened in the fifties with the Actors Studio with Elia Kazan and Tennessee Williams is a pivot point in the history of performance. It radically changed the way that we tell stories and we're still reacting to it." Paul Newman was a member of and studied with the Actors Studio. Joanne Woodward also studied at the Actors Studio and worked with Sanford Meisner in the Neighborhood Playhouse School of the Theatre, where they met many of those interviewed for this documentary.

Many of the older interviews with friends and artistic collaborators are read by the cast over archival footage. Recent interviews with all three of their daughters as well as Sally Field and Martin Scorsese are included.

The interviews were the basis for Newman's posthumously published 2022 memoir, The Extraordinary Life of an Ordinary Man.

== Cast ==
- Joanne Woodward as herself
- Paul Newman as himself

The players

- Laura Linney as Joanne Woodward
- George Clooney as Paul Newman
- Karen Allen as Frances Woodward, Joanne Woodward's stepmother
- Brooks Ashmanskas as Gore Vidal
- Rose Byrne as Estelle Parsons
- Bobby Cannavale as Elia Kazan
- Billy Crudup as James Goldstone
- Ben Dickey as Mark Rydell, Joanne's roommate
- Vincent D'Onofrio as John Huston, Karl Malden
- Josh Hamilton as George Roy Hill
- Sterlin Harjo as Robert Altman
- Oscar Isaac as Sydney Pollack
- Latanya R. Jackson as Maude Brink, Joanne's aunt
- Zoe Kazan as Jackie McDonald (Newman's first wife, aka Jackie Witte)
- Tom McCarthy as Sidney Lumet
- Alessandro Nivola as Richard Brooks, Robert Redford
- Barry Poltermann as Stewart Stern
- Sam Rockwell as Stuart Rosenberg, director of Cool Hand Luke
- Mark Ruffalo as Meade Roberts
- Jonathan Marc Sherman as Martin Ritt
- Steve Zahn as Donald "Duck" Dobbins

Original interviews

- Stephanie Newman
- Martin Scorsese
- Billy Crudup
- Sanford Meisner
- Sidney Lumet
- Ewan McGregor
- Melissa Newman
- Nell Newman
- Clea Newman
- Maya Hawke
- Mario Andretti
- Anne Keefe
- Mark Wade
- Sally Field
- A. E. Hotchner
- David Letterman
- Henry Elkind
- Peter Elkind
- Emily Wachtel
- Ryan Hawke
- Zoe Kazan
- Sam Rockwell
- Mark Wade
- James Ivory
- Richard Linklater

== Episodes ==
| No. | Title | Directed by | Original release date |
|---|---|---|---|
| 1 | "Chapter One: Cosmic Orphans" | Ethan Hawke | July 21, 2022 |
| 2 | "Chapter Two: A Star Is Born" | Ethan Hawke | July 21, 2022 |
| 3 | "Chapter Three: The Legend of Paul Leonard Newman" | Ethan Hawke | July 21, 2022 |
| 4 | "Chapter Four: Paying the Price" | Ethan Hawke | July 21, 2022 |
| 5 | "Chapter Five: Against the Sky" | Ethan Hawke | July 21, 2022 |
| 6 | "Chapter Six: Luck is an Art" | Ethan Hawke | July 21, 2022 |

== Production ==
Along with Martin Scorsese and Courtney Sexton, Amy Entelis also served as executive producer. The docuseries was produced by Emily Wachtel and Lisa Long Adler of Nook House Productions, Ryan Hawke of Under the Influence Productions, and Adam Gibbs. There was no original cinematography as the film's visuals consist entirely of existing elements (such as film clips and photos) combined with Zoom recordings recorded by Hawke. Barry Poltermann edited all six episodes. Hamilton Leithauser composed the original score, and the song "Beautiful People, Beautiful Problems" by Lana Del Rey and Stevie Nicks is featured prominently in the trailer.

== Release ==
Episode 1 of The Last Movie Stars was first screened at the SXSW Film Festival on March 14, 2022. Episodes 3 and 4 were screened at the Cannes Film Festival on May 21, 2022. CNN+ was originally set to stream the series but after it dissolved, HBO Max became its new home. It was released on HBO Max on July 21, 2022, with all six episodes appearing at once.

== Reception ==
The review aggregator website Rotten Tomatoes reported a 100% approval rating with an average rating of 9.2/10, based on 21 critic reviews. The website's critics consensus reads, "The Last Movie Stars delivers the goods as a revealing retrospective of Paul Newman and Joanne Woodward's romance, but director Ethan Hawke elevates this docuseries into a revelatory exploration of marriage and stardom."

The Guardian called the docuseries "a case study in fandom practiced properly," noting that the documentary series deals with Newman's failings as a parent and his alcoholism, while at the same time taking a worshipful attitude toward its subjects. Its review observed that Hawke "makes no effort to minimize his own presence under some pretense of fly-on-the-wall objectivity. As much as his extensive research project exists to chronicle the lives and works of a Hollywood power couple in a league of their own, he also digests the narrative at hand by examining his own relationship to it."

The New York Times television critic Mike Hale called the series "charming, entertaining and, for the eyes, addictive." But he added that "as the story gets darker over the years, the series loses some of its verve, and it starts to feel like a forced march through the two stars' movie and TV catalogs. Hawke doesn't seem as comfortable, or as interested, whenever the subject moves away from acting." The poor quality of many of their movies, he asserted, is glossed over.
