= Liz Garbus =

American film director and producer (born 1970)

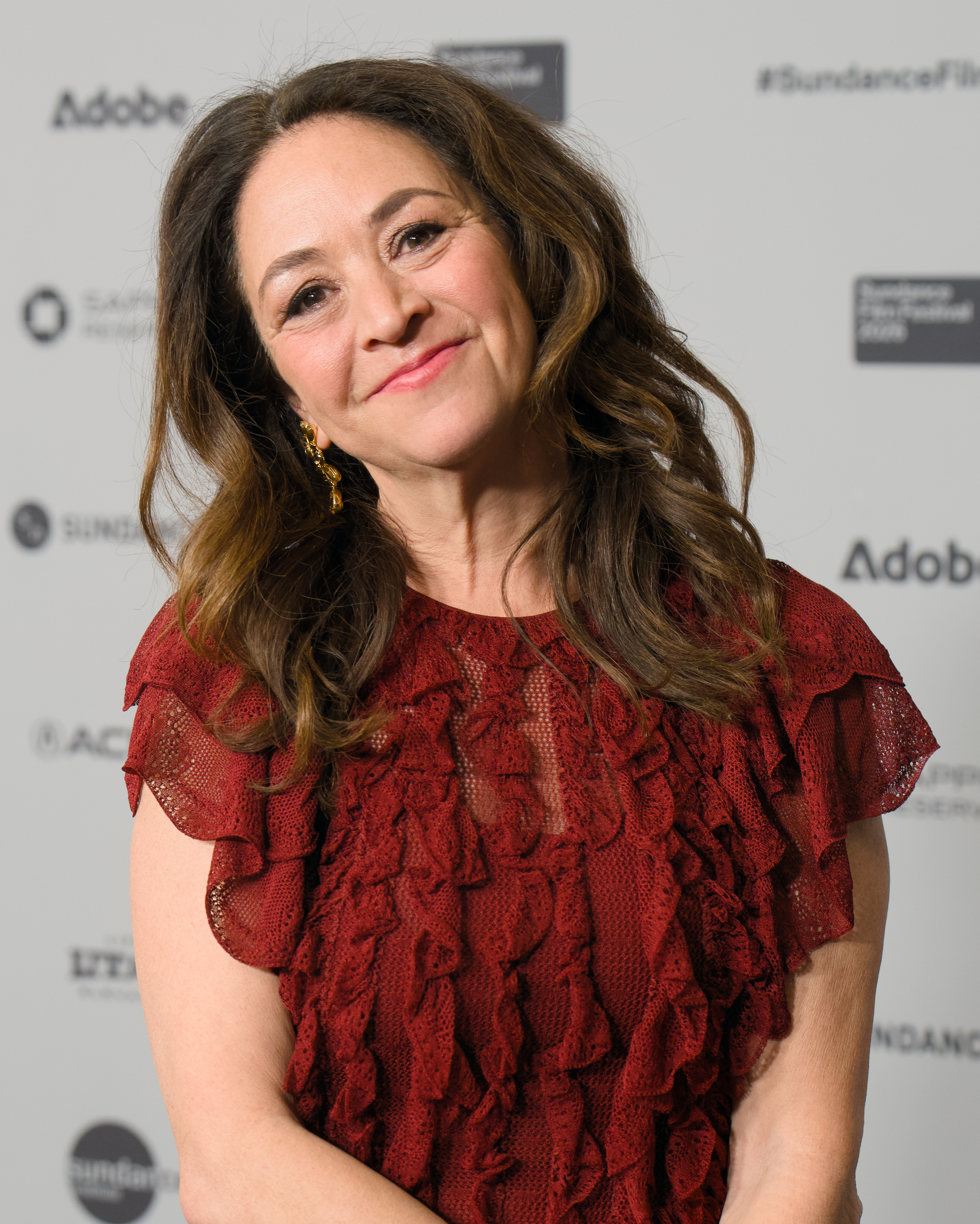
- Garbus in 2026
- Born: Elizabeth Freya Garbus; April 11, 1970 (age 56)
- Education: Brown University
- Occupation: Documentary filmmaker
- Years active: 1993–present
- Spouse: Dan Cogan
- Children: 2
- Website: Official website

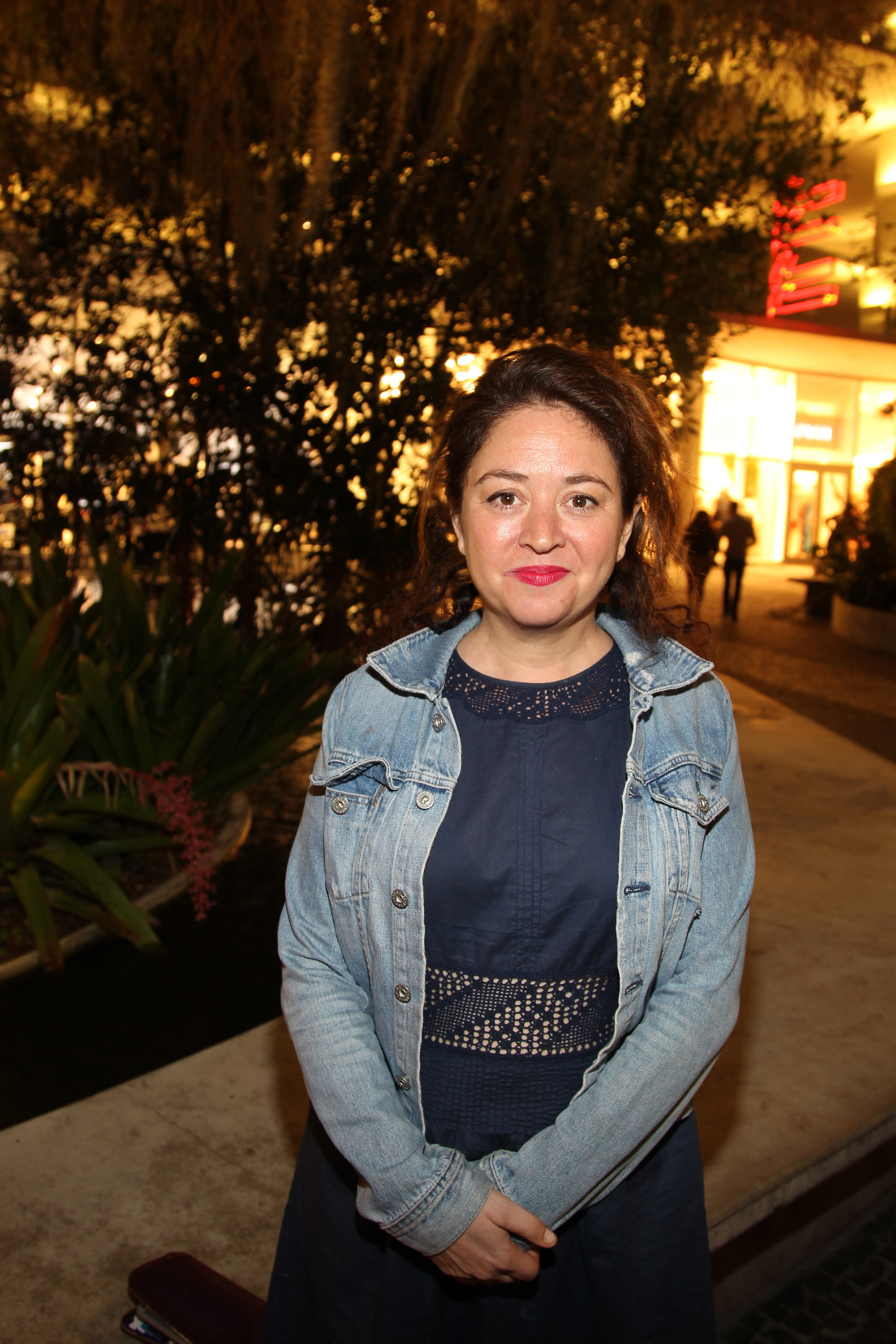
Garbus at the Miami Film Festival presentation of Nothing Left Unsaid

Elizabeth Freya Garbus (born April 11, 1970) is an American documentary film director and producer. Notable documentaries Garbus has made are The Farm: Angola, USA, Ghosts of Abu Ghraib, Bobby Fischer Against the World, Love, Marilyn, What Happened, Miss Simone?, and Becoming Cousteau. She is co-founder and co-director of the New York City-based documentary film production company Story Syndicate.

== Early life and education ==
Garbus grew up in New York City. She is the daughter of civil rights attorney Martin Garbus and writer, therapist, and social worker Ruth Meitin Garbus. Her family is Jewish.

In 1992, Garbus graduated magna cum laude with a bachelor's degree in history and semiotics from Brown University.

== Career ==
While in high school, Garbus made a documentary about students' last day of school. At Brown she took classes in video production in addition to her major subjects.

After college, Garbus worked as an intern at Miramax. She eventually landed a job working for filmmaker Jonathan Stack.

They co-directed The Farm: Angola, USA, which was nominated for a 1998 Academy Award. The film garnered multiple awards, including the Sundance Grand Jury Prize and two Emmy awards.

In 1998, Garbus co-founded an independent documentary production company, Moxie Firecracker Films, with fellow Brown University alumna Rory Kennedy. They combined the names of each woman's previous production company for their joint one: Kennedy's was called Moxie and Garbus’ was called Firecracker.

In 2002, Garbus' film The Execution of Wanda Jean was shown at the Sundance Film Festival.

In 2003, Garbus directed The Nazi Officer's Wife, which was narrated by Susan Sarandon and Julia Ormond. ¹ In 2005, Garbus collaborated with partner Rory Kennedy to executive-produce Street Fight about the 2002 Newark mayoral election; it was nominated for an Academy Award.

In 2006, the pair worked with actress Rosie Perez to produce her film Yo Soy Boricua.

In 2007, Garbus' film Ghosts of Abu Ghraib premiered at Sundance. It and won an Emmy for Outstanding Non-Fiction Special of 2007.

In 2007, Garbus directed the film Coma, which aired on HBO in July of that year. The film follows four brain-injured patients receiving treatment at the JFK-Johnson Medical Facility in New Jersey.

In 2009, Garbus’s film, Shouting Fire: Stories from the Edge of Free Speech (HBO) premiered at the Sundance Film Festival.

In 2011, There's Something Wrong with Aunt Diane was chosen to be a part of HBO’s Documentary Films Summer Series.

In 2011, Garbus directed Bobby Fischer Against the World, which chronicled the great Cold War showdown between Bobby Fischer and Boris Spassky in 1972. The film premiered on HBO and opened the Premiere Documentary Section of the Sundance Film Festival.

Bobby Fischer Against the World, opened the documentary section of the 2011 Sundance Film Festival, reserved for master American documentary filmmakers.

In 2011, Garbus was nominated a second time for an Academy Award, for her film Killing in the Name, which she produced with her producing partner Rory Kennedy.

Garbus' 2012 film, Love, Marilyn featured Elizabeth Banks, Ellen Burstyn, Glenn Close, Viola Davis, Jennifer Ehle, Lindsay Lohan, Lili Taylor, Uma Thurman, Marisa Tomei, Evan Rachel Wood and others reading from Monroe’s never-before-seen private writings. The film opened as a Gala Premiere at the 2012 Toronto International Film Festival and was acquired by HBO for a 2013 debut.

Love, Marilyn, internationally opened as a Gala Premiere at the 2012 Toronto International Film Festival and aired on HBO summer of 2013.

In 2014, A Good Job: Stories of the FDNY, which Garbus directed and produced, premiered on HBO and featured first-hand accounts of veteran firefighters and interviews conducted by former FDNY member Steve Buscemi.

In 2015, she directed What Happened, Miss Simone? a documentary about the singer Nina Simone. What Happened, Miss Simone? was the opening night film for Sundance Film Festival, it was nominated for an Academy Award for Best Documentary Feature 2015, a Grammy for Best Music Film 2015, and Garbus was nominated for a DGA Award for Outstanding Directorial Achievement in Documentary. The film was released by Netflix on June 26, 2015. It won an Emmy Award for Outstanding Documentary.

In January 2018, The New York Times announced that Garbus and a documentary crew had been "basically living in the...newsroom since Inauguration Day [with] full access to the Russia investigation and much more." The completed work called The Fourth Estate aired on Showtime in May 2018.

In May 2018, HBO premiered Garbus' documentary, A Dangerous Son, which portrays three families as they deal with severe mental illness of three different children, and their efforts to get treatment and navigate the health care system.

In September 2020, Garbus released All In: The Fight for Democracy, a documentary film about voting rights in the United States. It featured voting rights activist Stacey Abrams and other American politicians, including former United States Attorney General Eric Holder and then-Representative Marcia Fudge.

In 2021, Garbus released Becoming Cousteau, a documentary about Jacques Cousteau for National Geographic Documentary Films. In 2022, Garbus directed Harry & Meghan, a documentary series for Netflix revolving around Prince Harry and Meghan Markle.

== Personal life ==
Garbus is married to film producer Dan Cogan; the two have a daughter, Amelia, and a son, Theodore.

== Filmography ==
Year	Film	Director	Producer	Notes
1996	Final Judgment: The Execution of Antonio James	No	Yes	
1998	The Farm: Angola, USA	Yes	Yes	
1999	Different Moms	Yes	Executive	
2000	Epidemic Africa	No	Yes	Documentary short
2000	The Changing Face of Beauty	Yes	Yes	Co-directed with Rory Kennedy
2000	Juvies	Yes	Yes	
2000	True Life – MTV	Yes	Yes	Episode: "The Travelers"
2002	The Execution of Wanda Jean	Yes	Yes	
2002	Schooling Jewel	No	Yes	
2003	Together: Stop Violence Against Women	No	Yes	
2003	A Boy's Life	No	Yes	
2003	The Nazi Officer's Wife	Yes	No	
2003	Pandemic: Facing AIDS	No	Yes	TV mini-series documentary
2003	Girlhood	Yes	Yes	
2003	Con Man	No	Co-executive	
2004	Indian Point: Imagining the Unimaginable	No	Yes	
2005	Xiara's Song	Yes	Yes	Cinemax
2005	P.O.V.	No	Executive	Episode: Street Fight
2006	Yo soy Boricua, pa'que tu lo sepas!	Yes	Yes	Co-directed with Rosie Perez
2006	Ten Days That Unexpectedly Changed America	No	Yes	Episode: "The Homestead Strike"
2007	Addiction	Yes	No	Episode: "Brain Imaging Brookhaven National Laboratory"
2007	Coma IV	Yes	Yes	
2007	Ghosts of Abu Ghraib	No	Yes	
2009	Shouting Fire: Stories from the Edge of Free Speech	Yes	Yes	
2010	Family Affair	No	Yes	
2010	The Fence (La Barda)	No	Yes	Documentary short
2010	Killing in the Name	No	Yes	Documentary short
2011	Bobby Fischer Against the World	Yes	Yes	
2011	There's Something Wrong with Aunt Diane	Yes	Yes	
2011	The Fight for Fischer's Estate	Yes	Yes	Video documentary short
2011	Chess History	Yes	Yes	Video documentary short
2011	Focus Forward: Short Films, Big Ideas	Yes	No	Documentary short
2012	Love, Marilyn	Yes	Yes	
2012	Robot	Yes	Yes	Documentary short
2014	A Good Job: Stories of the FDNY	Yes	Yes	
2013	Before the Spring: After the Fall	No	Yes	
2015	What Happened, Miss Simone?	Yes	Yes	
2016	Nothing Left Unsaid: Gloria Vanderbilt & Anderson Cooper	Yes	Yes	
2018	The Fourth Estate	Yes	Yes	
2018	A Dangerous Son	No	Yes	
2019	Who Killed Garrett Phillips?	Yes	Yes	Two-part documentary
2020	Lost Girls	Yes	Executive	
2020	I'll Be Gone in the Dark	Yes	Yes	Six episodes
2020	All In: The Fight for Democracy	Yes	Yes	
2020	Ariana Grande: Excuse Me, I Love You	No	Yes	Concert film
2021	The Handmaid's Tale	Yes	No	
2021	Becoming Cousteau	Yes	Yes	
2021	Fauci	No	Executive	
2022	Harry & Meghan	Yes	Executive	Documentary series; six episodes
2023	Last Call: When a Serial Killer Stalked Queer New York	No	Executive	Documentary series
2025	Gone Girls: The Long Island Serial Killer	Yes	Executive	Documentary series
2025	One Night in Idaho: The College Murders	Yes	Executive	Documentary series
2026	Give Me the Ball!	Yes	Yes	Co-directed with Elizabeth Wolff
2026	Dynasty: The Murdochs	Yes	Executive	Documentary series
2026	A Killer Story	No	Executive	Documentary series
2026	Taken: Natalee Holloway	No	Executive	Documentary series

== Works and publications ==
- Garbus, Elizabeth Freya (1992). Feminine Transgression – Historicizing desire and subversion in Contemporary France (Thesis/dissertation). Providence, RI: Brown University. OCLC 549674496.
- Garbus, Liz (2015). "Chapter 18: Prisons". In Quinn, James (ed.). Adventures in the Lives of Others: Ethical Dilemmas in Factual Filmmaking. London: I.B. Tauris & Co. Ltd. ISBN 978-0-8577-2652-0. OCLC 925780839.

== Selected honors and awards ==
- Open Society Foundations' Center on Crime, Communities, and Culture, Fellow
- 1998: Sundance Film Festival, Documentary, Grand Jury Prize for The Farm: Angola, USA with Jonathan Stack – tied with Frat House
- 1998: L.A. Film Critics Association Awards, Best Documentary/Non-Fiction Film for The Farm: Angola, USA with Jonathan Stack
- 1998: New York Film Critics Circle Awards, Best Non-Fiction Film for The Farm: Angola, USA with Jonathan Stack
- 1999: Emmy Award, Outstanding Non-Fiction Special (nominee) for The Farm: Angola, USA with Jonathan Stack, Gayle Gilman, Michael Cascio
- 1999: Academy Award, Best Documentary, Feature (nominee) for The Farm: Angola, USA with Jonathan Stack
- 2002: Sundance Film Festival, Documentary, Grand Jury Prize (nominee) for The Execution of Wanda Jean
- 2003: SXSW Film Festival, Documentary Feature, Audience Award for Girlhood
- 2006: Emmy Award, Outstanding Continuing Coverage of a News Story - Long Form (nominee) for P.O.V. Street Fight with Rory Kennedy, Cara Mertes, Sally Jo Fifer, Marshall Curry
- 2007: Emmy Award, Outstanding Non-Fiction Special for Ghosts of Abu Ghraib with Rory Kennedy, Jack Youngelson, Diana Barrett, Sheila Nevins, Nancy Abraham
- 2009: Sundance Film Festival, Documentary, Grand Jury Prize (nominee) for Shouting Fire: Stories from the Edge of Free Speech
- 2012: Emmy Award, Outstanding Non-Fiction Special (nominee) for Bobby Fischer Against the World with Sheila Nevins, Dan Cogan, Stanley F. Buchthal, Rory Kennedy, Matthew Justus, Nancy Abraham
- 2015: Peabody Award for What Happened, Miss Simone?
- 2016: Directors Guild of America Award, Outstanding Directorial Achievement in Documentary (nominee) for What Happened, Miss Simone?
- 2016: Emmy Award, Outstanding Non-Fiction Special for What Happened, Miss Simone? with Sidney Beaumont, Amy Hobby, Justin Wilkes, Jayson Jackson
- 2016: Emmy Award, Outstanding Directing for Nonfiction Programming (nominee) for What Happened, Miss Simone?
- 2016: Academy Award, Best Documentary, Feature (nominee) for What Happened, Miss Simone? with Amy Hobby, Justin Wilkes
- 2021: Peabody Award (nominee) for Nuclear Family
