= Lucky Them =

2013 film

- Film poster
- Directed by: Megan Griffiths
- Written by: Huck Botko; Emily Wachtel
- Produced by: Adam Gibbs; Amy Hobby; Emily Wachtel
- Starring: Toni Collette; Thomas Haden Church; Nina Arianda; Ryan Eggold; Ahna O'Reilly; Oliver Platt
- Cinematography: Ben Kutchins
- Edited by: Meg Reticker
- Music by: Craig Wedren
- Distributed by: IFC Films
- Release dates: September 6, 2013 (TIFF); May 30, 2014 (United States)
- Running time: 97 minutes
- Country: United States
- Language: English
- Box office: $48,995

Lucky Them is a 2013 American comedy-drama film directed by Megan Griffiths. It was screened in the Special Presentation section at the 2013 Toronto International Film Festival, and in a June 2014 screening at the Greenwich International Film Festival in producer Emily Wachtel's native Stamford, Connecticut. The film received generally positive reviews from critics. The film was released theatrically on May 30, 2014, by IFC Films. It was released on DVD on September 30, 2014 and on Blu-ray on July 3, 2015.

== Plot ==
Ellie Klug is a music critic in her 40s at a dying underground magazine, Stax. Her editor, Giles, (Oliver Platt) assigns Ellie to write a piece on Matthew Smith on the 10th anniversary of his disappearance which most people consider a suicide. Ellie, who was Matthew's childhood sweetheart and who remained with him until his disappearance, is unconvinced that he is dead and decides to track Matthew down. After receiving a tip online as to Matthew Smith's location, Giles gives Ellie a thousand dollars to pay the source. However Ellie is distracted by Lucas Stone, (Ryan Eggold) a struggling musician who is interested in Ellie, and accidentally leaves the money beside him when she leaves to catch her bus. When Ellie ignores his calls, Lucas misinterprets Ellie's actions and uses the money to cut a demo tape, believing that Ellie left him the money as a show of faith.

Ellie manages to come up with the money to bribe her source by going to Charlie (Thomas Haden Church), an awkward but wealthy socialite whom she had briefly dated in the past. Charlie agrees to help Ellie if she allows him to film her as part of a documentary on her search for Matthew Smith. Ellie agrees, but the source is a scammer and the documentary quickly falls apart after they run out of leads. Charlie admits he loaned her the money because he was interested in having a relationship with her.

Ellie begins dating Lucas, but grows insecure after he begins to experience some success. When he fails to show up for Charlie's wedding Ellie assumes he has left her and sleeps with another man only to have Lucas walk into her room late in the night. He returns the money to her with a note explaining the miscommunication that led to him taking it.

After breaking up with Lucas, Ellie spirals into a depression, obsessively watching the video of a man she believes to be Matthew Smith performing a song which she believes is about her. She finally has a breakthrough when she realizes that all of Matthew's old issues of Stax were under his mother's name and discovers while looking through the database at work that the subscription was never cancelled but the delivery address was changed.

Ellie and Charlie go to the address listed on the subscription and find it's a bar. When Ellie asks the bartender if she knows Matthew Smith the woman answers in the negative but places a call on a cellphone shortly after. Ellie and Charlie follow her to her home. In the morning she sees a man outside the house and after approaching him she realizes it's Matthew. The two have a short conversation where she realizes that Matthew and the bartender are living together and have a child. When Ellie asks him about the song he was playing he tells her he has no new songs. Ellie and Charlie leave and Charlie gives Ellie all the footage from the documentary. She in turn writes a piece for Giles about Matthew without revealing that he is still alive and leading a quiet and secluded life. The end of the film shows Ellie going out on a date with Charlie.

== Cast ==
- Toni Collette as Ellie Klug
- Ahna O'Reilly as Charlotte
- Thomas Haden Church as Charlie
- Amy Seimetz as Sara
- Joanne Woodward as Doris (voice)
- Oliver Platt as Giles
- Lynn Shelton as Lisa
- Ryan Eggold as Lucas Stone
- Nina Arianda as Dana
- Johnny Depp as Matthew Smith
- Louis Hobson as Lawrence

== Reception ==
On Rotten Tomatoes the film has a 78% approval rating based on 41 reviews, with an average rating of 6.70/10. The site's consensus states that "Lucky Them may not quite live up to Toni Collette's bravura starring performance, but it's certainly elevated by it". On Metacritic, the film holds a score of 65 out of 100 based on reviews from 19 critics, indicating "generally favorable" reviews.

Peter Travers of Rolling Stone gave Lucky Them 3 out of 4, saying that "Haden Church gives the movie the joyous kick it needs. His flirty thrust-and-parry with Collette is beautifully played". Justin Chang of Variety said that "the truest and most meaningful chemistry [in Lucky Them] is generated by Ellie and Charlie, two individuals who are so fun to hang out with that they justify even the film’s flimsiest narrative setups". David Rooney of The Hollywood Reporter said that the set-up was a little labored, "the performances are so engaging and the characters so pleasurable to be around that it's easy to forget the script's flaws". Tim Grierson of ScreenDaily called Lucky Them "largely a goofy comedy", but also said that "Griffiths gives the film a melancholy centre that's poignant without being overdone".

Lucky Them also got a 3 out of 5 from The Times of India and RogerEbert.com.

When asked about why it took an additional year and a half for the film to be released in Australia despite having a star cast, Damien Straker of Impulse Gamer said that the film "either isn't spectacular or it's increasingly difficult for women to etch themselves into the film market, currently dominated by men. Truthfully, it’s a bit of both".

Abhimanyu Das of Slant Magazine gave Lucky Them 2 out of 4 stars, saying that "the thinness of the material is only accentuated by the cast’s spirited efforts to pad it out".
