= Martin Garbus =

American lawyer (born 1934)

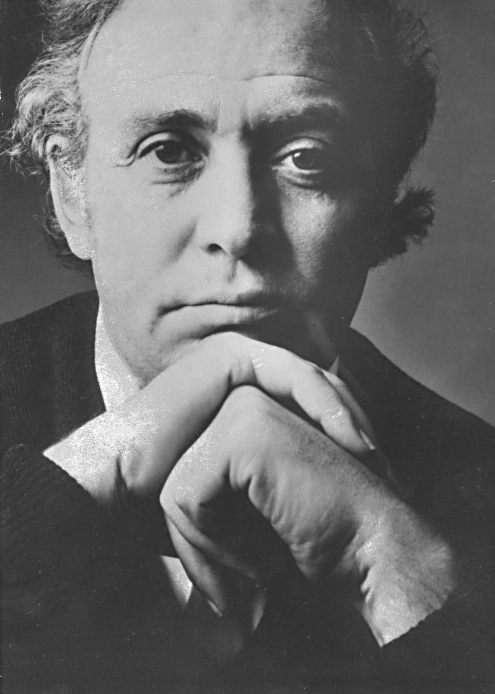
- Born: August 8, 1934 (age 92); Brooklyn, New York, U.S.
- Education: Hunter College; New York University Law School
- Occupations: Attorney, author, teacher
- Years active: 1963-present
- Children: Cassandra; Elizabeth "Liz"

Martin Garbus (born August 8, 1934) is an American attorney.

== Education ==
Garbus graduated from the Bronx High School of Science in 1951, earned his B.A. from Hunter College in 1955, and received his J.D. from NYU School of Law. He later pursued graduate studies in economics at Columbia University, English at The New School, and law at NYU. He was admitted to the U.S. Supreme Court Bar by 1963.

== Early career and legal scholarship ==
Garbus began his legal career after earning his J.D. and serving two years in the U.S. Army by clerking for noted attorneys Emile Zola Berman and Ephraim London. In 1966, he became co‑director of Columbia's Center on Social Policy and Law while teaching there. He then served as director‑counsel of the Roger Baldwin Foundation of the ACLU. He also served as Legal Director and associate director of the national ACLU, led the Lawyers Committee to Defend Civil Rights, ran for office in 1974, and founded the Frankfurt Garbus law firm in 1977. He taught as an adjunct at Yale Law School and lectured at Harvard and Stanford. As a Fulbright scholar in 2005–2006, he taught at Tsinghua and Renmin Law Schools in Beijing.

== Notable cases ==
Garbus' clients include Nelson Mandela, Andrei Sakharov, Václav Havel, Samuel Beckett, Al Pacino, Daniel Ellsberg, Philip Roth, Michael Moore, Sean Connery, Michael Caine, Michael York, Lauren Bacall, Agnes Martin, Pace Gallery, Estate of Mark Rothko, Robert Mapplethorpe, Cincinnati Museum of Fine Art, Robert Redford, Spike Lee, Sally Mann, Allen Ginsberg, Kathy Boudin, Garry Marshall, Marilyn Monroe, Igor Stravinsky, Nora Ephron, Salman Rushdie, Simon & Schuster, Random House, Bertelsmann, Penguin Books, Putnam, Grove Press, The Sundance Film Festival, Alger Hiss, Ecuadorian plaintiffs, Estate of John Cheever, Julie Taymor, Justices in India, Knopf, Leonard Weinglass, Michael Bloomberg, Michael York, Mississippi Freedom Democratic Party, Rwanda, Sean Connery, Sonny Mehta, Sophia Loren to clients, Steven Donziger, Susan Sontag, Viking Penguin, and William Kunstler.

== Public speaking ==
Garbus debated former Independent Prosecutor Kenneth Starr. He served as a commentator for NBC, ABC, CBS, PBS, Charlie Rose, CNN, Fox News, Court TV, CCTV in China and the BBC, Time and Newsweek.

Garbus' career is set forth in the award-winning HBO documentary Shouting Fire: Stories from the Edge of Free Speech.

== International work ==
Garbus has worked for the governments of the former Soviet Union, Czechoslovakia, Poland, Rwanda, and China as a consultant. In 2002, the government of China hired Garbus for help with digital piracy. He represented dissidents Václav Havel, Nelson Mandela, and Andrei Sakharov. In 2004, he was appointed advisor to the Chinese team responsible for the creation of China's intellectual property laws.

== Personal life ==
Garbus has two daughters. Cassandra Garbus is an author and teacher. Liz Garbus, a director and producer of documentaries, is married to producer Dan Cogan.

== Awards and recognition ==
- PEN USA First Amendment Award of Honor (2007)
- New York University Law Alumni Achievement Award (2004)
- Hunter College Law Alumni Achievement Award (2005)
- Hunter College Hall of Fame (2005)
- Marquis Who's Who in America (2017 and prior years)
- Marquis Who's Who in American Law (2017 and prior years)
- Civil Liberties Union Award (2007)
- Senator William Fulbright Award for Global Leadership in International Law (2012)
- James Joyce Award from the University of Dublin for Excellence in Law (2014)
- Trinity College Award for Defending First Amendment Cases (2014)

== Bibliography ==
=== Books ===
- Ready for the Defense (Farrar Straus & Giroux, 1971; Avon softcover, 1972, and Carroll & Graf reprint, 1995)
- Traitors and Heroes (Athenaeum, 1987; Random House softcover, 1988)
- Tough Talk: How I Fought For Writers, Comics, Bigots, and the American Way, introduction by David Halberstam (Random House-Times Books, 1998, Times Books softcover, 1999)
- Courting Disaster: The Supreme Court and the Unmaking of America Law (Times Books, New York, 2002; Times Books softcover, 2003)
- The Next 25 Years: How the Supreme Court Will Make You Forget the Meaning of Words Like Privacy, Equality and Freedom (Seven Stories Press 2007)
- North of Havana: The Untold Story of Dirty Politics, Secret Diplomacy, and the Trial of the Cuban Five (The New Press; Illustrated edition, 2019)
- The Candy Store, to be published 2025

=== Other ===
- Introduction to Brown, Walt (1992). The People v. Lee Harvey Oswald. Carroll & Graf. ISBN 978-0881848694.

== Appearances in films ==
- Shouting Fire: Stories from the Edge of Free Speech, directed by Liz Garbus
- The American Ruling Class written by Lewis Lapham
- This Film Is Not Yet Rated directed by Kirby Dick discussing the Motion Picture Association film code
- Lenny Bruce: Swear to Tell the Truth directed by Robert Weide
- The First Amendment Project: No Joking, directed and written by Bob Balaban
- Frankie and Johnny, produced by Paramount, directed by Garry Marshall
- Dear God, Produced by Paramount, directed by Garry Marshall
- "American Masters, Biography of Philip Roth" 2013
