= Smart Start, Inc. =

American manufacturer of alcohol-monitoring technology

Smart Start LLC
- Type: Private limited company
- Industry: Automotive accessories, alcohol-monitoring technology
- Founded: 1992; 34 years ago in Irving, Texas, U.S.
- Founder: Bettye & Jay D. Rodgers
- Headquarters: Grapevine, Texas, United States
- Key people: Albert Morales (CEO)
- Products: Ignition interlock devices, portable alcohol-monitoring devices
- Parent: Apollo Global Management
- Website: www.smartstartinc.com

Smart Start, Inc. is an American manufacturer of alcohol-monitoring technology, including ignition interlock devices and portable alcohol breath-test devices. It provides services and technologies that prevent intoxicated drivers from operating a vehicle. In almost all cases, these devices are installed by court order due to DUI or DWI violations.

== History ==
Smart Start Inc. was founded and incorporated in September 1992 in Dallas–Fort Worth by Bettye Rodgers and Jay D. Rodgers under the name "1A Smart Start, Inc."

On August 21, 2015, 1A Smart Start, Inc. was acquired by ABRY Partners, becoming 1A Smart Start, LLC. In 2021, it was acquired by the Apollo Impact platform, managed by Apollo Global Management.

Smart Start claims to have installed over 200,000 ignition interlock devices. The devices are in use in Canada, the United States, and Australia.

In June 2025, Smart Start announced Albert Morales as the company's new CEO.

== Devices ==
In 1998, Smart Start began manufacturing National Highway Traffic Safety Association (NHTSA) certified ignition interlock devices. In 2008, Smart Start became the first ignition interlock provider to offer a camera with its ignition interlock, allowing authorities to monitor alcohol testing via photo.

Smart Start introduced its IN-HOM portable alcohol monitoring devices in 2009, rebranded as SmartMobile.
