= Shouting Fire: Stories from the Edge of Free Speech =

2009 film by Liz Garbus

- Directed by: Liz Garbus
- Produced by: Liz Garbus, Rory Kennedy, Jed Rothstein
- Music by: Miriam Cutler
- Distributed by: Moxie Firecracker Films
- Release date: January 2009 (Sundance Film Festival)
- Running time: 74 minutes
- Country: United States
- Language: English

Shouting Fire: Stories from the Edge of Free Speech is a 2009 documentary film about freedom of speech and the First Amendment in the United States, directed by Liz Garbus. The documentary prominently features First Amendment attorney, Martin Garbus, who talks about the past and present state of free speech in the United States, and the case of Ward Churchill. A tenured professor of Ethnic Studies at the University of Colorado, Churchill was fired after publishing a controversial article about the 9/11 attacks and being investigated for academic misconduct related to other issues. The film also explores the cases of Debbie Almontaser, Chase Harper, and protesters at the 2004 Republican National Convention in New York City. Those interviewed include historians, legal scholars and attorneys, such as Floyd Abrams, David Horowitz, Eric Foner, Donna Lieberman, Daniel Pipes, Richard Posner, Kenneth Starr and Josh Wolf.
