= Ignition interlock device =

Breathalyzer for an individual's vehicle

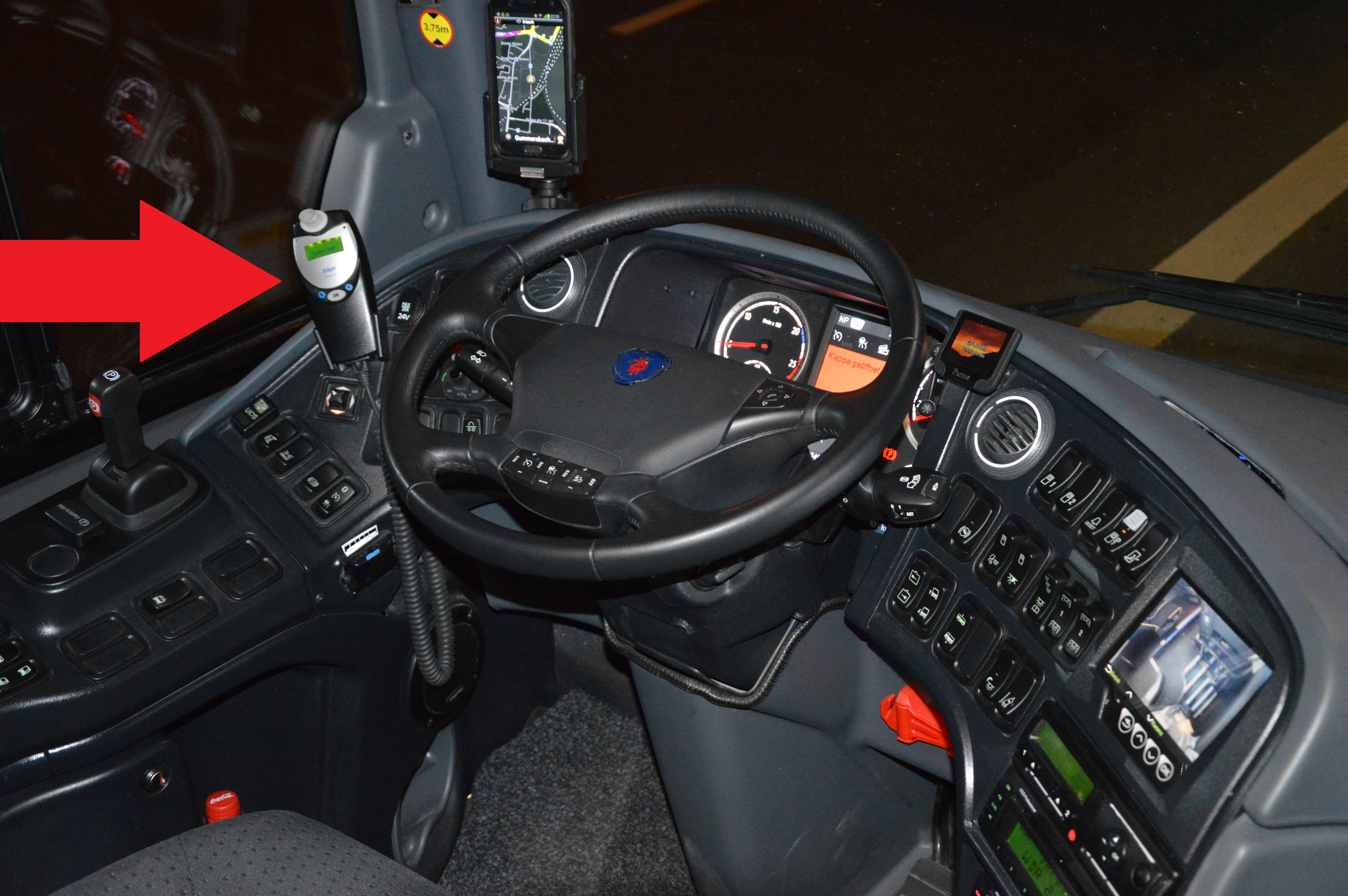
A Draeger ignition interlock device (red arrow) in a Scania bus

An ignition interlock device or breath alcohol ignition interlock device (IID or BAIID) is a breathalyzer for an individual's vehicle. It requires the driver to blow into a mouthpiece on the device before starting or continuing to operate the vehicle. If the resultant breath-alcohol concentration analyzed result is greater than the programmed blood alcohol concentration (which varies between countries), the device prevents the engine from being started. The interlock device is located inside the vehicle, near the driver’s seat, and is directly connected to the engine’s ignition system. It is a form of electronic monitoring.

An ignition interlock interrupts the signal from the ignition to the starter until a valid breath sample is provided that meets maximal alcohol guidelines in that jurisdiction. At that point, the vehicle can be started as normal. A breath sample is not required to start the vehicle if the engine has been running within a time-out period, to allow quick re-starts in case the vehicle stalls. At random times after the engine has been started, the IID will require another breath sample, referred to as a rolling retest. The purpose of the rolling retest is to prevent someone other than the driver from providing a breath sample. If the breath sample isn't provided, or the sample exceeds the ignition interlock's preset blood alcohol level, the device will log the event, warn the driver, and then start up an alarm in accordance to state regulations (e.g., lights flashing, horn honking) until the ignition is turned off, or a clean breath sample has been provided. A common misconception is that interlock devices will simply turn off the engine if alcohol is detected; this would, however, create an unsafe driving situation.

== History ==
The first performance based interlocks were developed by Borg-Warner Corp. (now BorgWarner, Inc.), in 1969. In 1981, Jeffrey Feit, a student in New Jersey, placed in a statewide innovation contest with a primitive schematic of a breathalyzer based interlock device. In 1983, Hans Doran, a student in Limerick, presented a working prototype at the Young Scientist competition in Dublin. Alcohol-sensing devices became the standard through the 1980s. They employed semiconductor (nonspecific) alcohol sensors. Semiconductor-type (Taguchi) interlocks were sturdy and got the field moving, but did not hold calibration very well, were sensitive to altitude variation, and reacted positively to non-alcohol sources. Commercialization and more widespread adoption of the device was delayed pending improvement of systems for preventing circumvention.

By the early 1990s, the industry began to produce "second generation" interlocks with reliable and accurate fuel cell sensors. In the US, ignition interlocks are required to meet National Highway Traffic Safety Administration (NHTSA) standards.

== Design ==
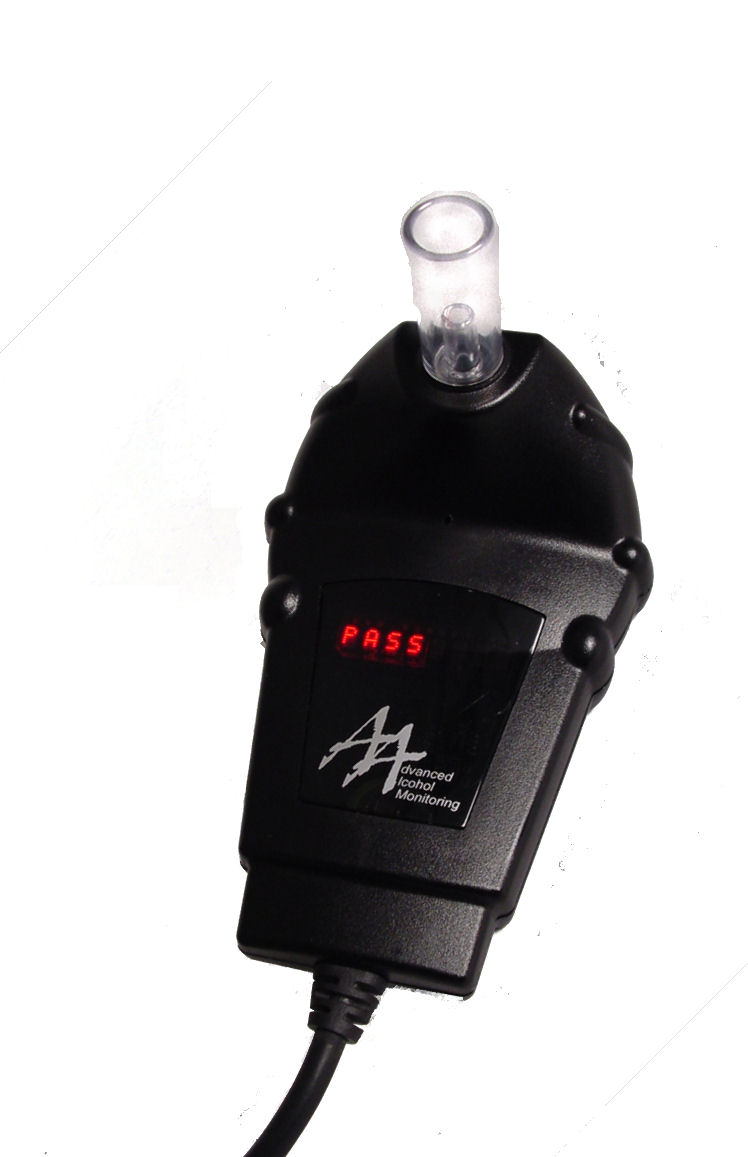
Close-up of an ignition interlock device featuring a breathing tube and simple pass/fail display

Modern ignition interlock devices use an alcohol-specific fuel cell for a sensor. A fuel cell sensor is an electrochemical device in which alcohol undergoes a chemical oxidation reaction at a catalytic electrode surface (platinum) to generate an electric current. This current is then measured and converted to an alcohol equivalent reading. Although fuel cell technology is not as accurate or reliable as infrared spectroscopy technology used in evidentiary breathalyzers, they are cheaper and tend to be more specific for alcohol. Alcohol, as defined here, includes isopropanol, sorbitol, menthol, methanol, and a host of other types of alcohols, in addition to ethanol, the consumed liquor.

The devices keep a record of the activity on the device and the interlocked vehicle's electrical system. This record, or log, is printed out or downloaded each time the device's sensors are calibrated, commonly at 30-, 60-, or 90-day intervals. Authorities may require periodic review of the log. If violations are detected, then additional sanctions can be implemented.

Periodic calibration is performed using either a pressurized alcohol–gas mixture at a known alcohol concentration, or with an alcohol wet bath arrangement that contains a known alcohol solution.

Some IIDs are equipped with cameras, which may be required by the jurisdiction or voluntarily used. The purpose of the camera is to identify "fail" results with the driver, which conveniently makes it easier to "clear" test failure reports when the "fail" result was triggered by a third party.

== Costs ==
The costs of installation, maintenance, and calibration are generally paid by the offender. Costs vary considerably around the world: As of 2015 in the US, on average, ignition interlock devices cost about $70–400 to install and about $60–160 per month for monitoring and calibration.

== Adoption ==
Many countries are requiring the ignition interlock as a condition for drivers convicted of drunk driving, especially repeat offenders. Most US states now permit judges to order the installation of an IID as a condition of probation; for repeat offenders, and for first offenders in some states, installation may be mandated by law.

Some commercial and public organizations have also voluntarily adopted ignition interlock devices for their vehicle fleet, to reduce the risk of monetary and reputational damages from accidents caused by a drunk driving employee.

=== Oceania ===
==== Australia ====
Interlock devices are used in the states of Victoria, South Australia, Western Australia, Tasmania, New South Wales, and Queensland. The Northern Territory and the ACT are also looking into their use.

==== New Zealand ====
Alcohol interlock devices became a sentencing option in New Zealand in August 2012. In December 2012, it was reported that the first device had been installed.

=== Europe ===
==== Austria ====
For a pilot project trialling interlocks from 2012-2013 driving licence administration authorities and a coordinating institution “ABS Institution” were created. Offenders could volunteer only if they met criteria such as "no alcohol addiction", a suspension of the drivers licence for at least four months where at least half of the suspension period had passed etc. The driver had to meet a mentor every two months with examination of data readout for violations and Discussion of the participant‘s experience with the device and of the driving behaviour in reference to the data readout and driver‘s logbook and development of strategies for a successful continuation of the programme, but no mandatory medical or psychological examination. Costs were 2,500 euros/year for the device, 300 euros to install and remove it and 600 euros minimum for the mentoring programme. Interlock systems were introduced in 2017 and consolidated into federal law (Driving License Act - Alternative Probation System Ordinance). As of 2020 there was no official evaluation and no published participation rate.

==== Belgium ====
Laws permitting judges to impose the use of interlock devices on convicted drunk drivers permitted their use from 2010, however by 2016 it had only been used in 55 cases. The cost, €3,500 to be paid by the driver, is a deterrent to its use. From 2017 the device may be paid from the fines imposed on the driver and in addition it may become compulsory for repeat offenders.

==== Denmark ====
The Danish Road Safety Traffic Authority trialed the lock in 2015 in a voluntary program, which could replace a licence suspension of maximum two years. As there was a very poor uptake of only 24 drivers, they changed it in 2017 to a three-year programme which resulted in an improved participation rate of 450 drivers as of 2020.

==== Finland ====
In Finland, the Finnish Transport and Communications Agency (Traficom) first trialled interlocks in 2005. It was put into legal effect in 2008 with a requirement to meet a health care professional for rehabilitation. Installation cost around €2400 for one year, €1920 per year for two years, or €1440 per year for three years. Only 5.7% of the drivers re-offended instead of 30% without the program. As of 2020, there were about 1,000 drivers participating in the Ignition Interlock Device program.

==== France ====
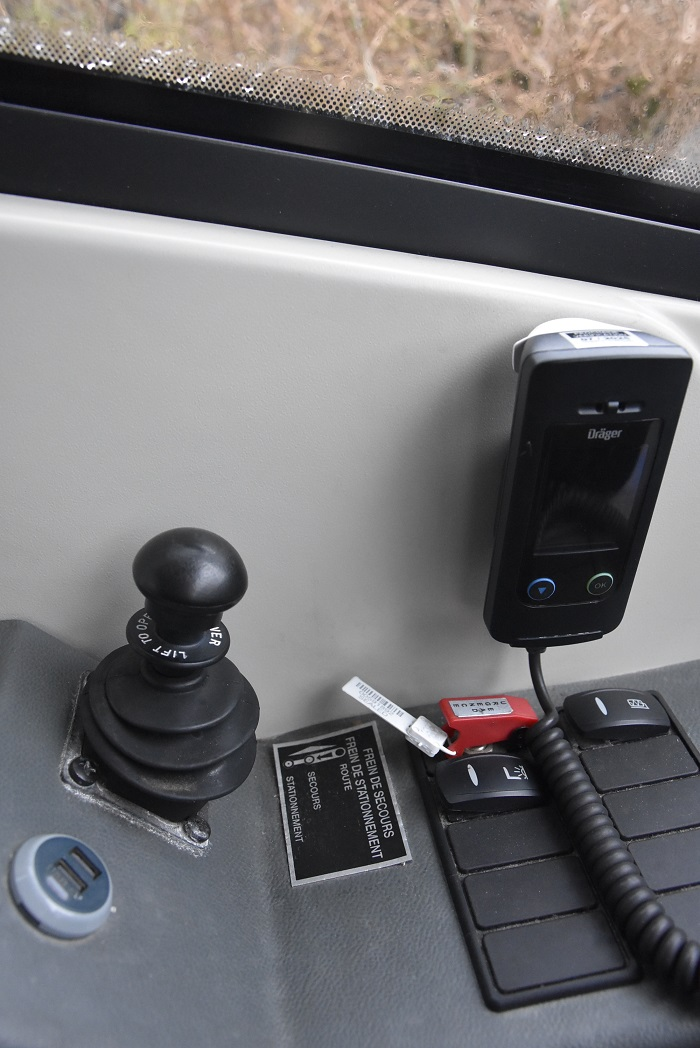
Ignition interlock device in a school bus

In France, the interlock programme has included a mandatory addiction consultation (without any ongoing monitoring during the program and no data analysis). In 2018, an alcohol interlock in repeat offences became compulsory and a trial was extended to the entire country. 1,500 ignition interlock devices were installed from 2018-2020 of a total of 8,104 prefectoral decrees restricting driving. Purchase costs were 1,300 euros or rental at 100 euros/month plus installation fees. The French Prefectures publish a Map of approved alcohol interlocks installers by department and region.

==== Lithuania ====
As of 2020, since 2016, more than 80 new school buses equipped with interlock devices had been handed over to municipalities, and 400 drivers had participated in an interlock programme.The Ministry of Health intended to create a new rehabilitation programme for drunk drivers.

==== Netherlands ====
From December 2011 the Netherlands started to use an interlock device for offenders who were caught with a blood alcohol level over a certain limit. The process which had over 5,000 participants was cancelled in 2015 due to legal and technical problems.

==== Poland ====
In Poland, since 2015 offenders driving with a BAC above 0.5 g/l may ask the court for their driving ban to be replaced with an alcohol interlock after at least half of the driving ban period has passed. Offenders with a lifetime driving ban can apply for an alcohol interlock after a minimum of 10 years. Interlocks are not part of a rehabilitation programme. The actual number of installed alcohol interlocks is unknown; the number of court orders were 609 in 2017, 2,180 in 2018, and 840 in the 1st half of 2019.

==== Sweden ====
The Swedish Transport Agency trialed it in 1999 and offered a programme of alcohol interlock device with medical certificates for drivers convicted with a BAC level between 0.2 and 0.9 g/l and a 2 year programme for convicted repeat offenders (within a five-year period), and offenders with a BAC level of at least 1.0 g/. As of 2020, about 3,000 people were driving with an alcohol interlock. Alcohol interlock devices are used in buses at least in Stockholm.

=== Americas ===
==== Canada ====
Some provinces, such as Ontario, Quebec, and Manitoba require any person convicted of drunk driving or refusing to provide a breath sample, to install an ignition interlock device into any vehicle he or she owns or operates, for a specified period of time (or for life), depending on the number of prior drunk driving offenses.

After so many drunk driving convictions, some provinces, such as Nova Scotia, will impose a lifetime driving ban, with no possibility of license reinstatement. Ontario courts, however, have the power to enact lifetime driving bans, with no possibility of reinstatement, after so many Criminal Code driving convictions. Under such circumstances, ignition interlock conditions are not put in place on the person's license.

==== United States ====
As of 2012, all 50 states have laws permitting the imposition of ignition-interlock devices as sentencing alternatives for drunk drivers. It is estimated that the United States could be saving 800 lives per year if all convicted drunk drivers were prevented from being involved in a fatal crash. The standard device in the US consists of a mouthpiece mounted on a handheld unit and a cord that attaches to the vehicle’s ignition system and runs on the battery. The driver is required to blow into the mouthpiece to test his or her alcohol level before starting the car. Devices are required to be installed at a certified service center. Devices are shipped directly to the qualifying service center and are never handled by the customer. The largest ignition interlock device providers are made by Draeger, Smart Start, Guardian, Intoxalock, based in Des Moines, Iowa and LifeSafer.

Most states impose the installation of ignition interlock devices (IID), with varying thresholds for installation requirements. Criminal process thresholds for installation requirements vary between minimum BAC levels (e.g., 0.20%, or 0.15%) or repeat offense, with about half of the states requiring installation on first offense.

These ignition interlock sanctions are meant as punishment, but also as a deterrence. When required under a high BAC level or multiple offense threshold, ignition interlock requirements address a strong tendency of repeat offense by drivers with alcoholic use disorder (AUD or alcoholism).

Ignition interlock requirements are also imposed in some instances after positive chemical blood alcohol tests, as a physical deterrent for drivers with alcoholic use disorder, or as a pseudo-civil punishment. Ignition interlock requirements are also imposed in some instances after an implied consent refusal under similar forensic procedures.

In most US implementations, IIDs are set to a "zero tolerance" level (set to either levels consistent with culinary alcohol or measurement errors).

In operation, the driver blows into IIDs to enable the car's starter. After a variable time period of approximately 20–40 minutes, the driver is required to re-certify (blow again) within a time period consistent with safely pulling off the roadway. If the driver fails to re-certify within the time period, the car will alarm in a manner similar to setting off the car's immobilizer, but mechanically independent of it. The installation company may provide regular reports to the Department of Motor Vehicles of a driver's home state regarding its usage.

Various US states have different penalties for disabling IIDs. In some cases, the driver may be penalized if a family member or mechanic disables the IID when not in use by the sanctioned individual, or temporarily for servicing the vehicle. In some implementations, disabling by mechanics and others is either permitted or authorisation easily obtained, but some jurisdictions restrict or deny authorisation. (Such restrictions on mechanics can be problematic, for example, if limited to designated "licensed mechanics" or as applied to routine repair procedures requiring operation of the ignition and starter systems.) Some jurisdictions criminalize such temporary bypass of IIDs.

Violations can occur from a driver not having reached the "zero tolerance" level, but can also occur from use by other drivers within legal limits, or from test anomalies. In some states, anomalies are routinely discounted, for example as not consistent with patterns of BAC levels or at levels incompatible with life (e.g., significant mouth alcohol - if read as BAC would mean the patient is dead). In some states, "fail" readings inconsistent with actual alcohol use can be cleared by a routine process, but other states automatically deem these "fail" readings as violations.

===== Alaska =====
"DUI Offenders may be required to obtain an Ignition Interlock Device (IID)."

===== Arizona =====
Arizona offers what is called a Special Ignition Interlock Restricted Driver's License In Lieu of mandatory license suspension. It is a type of restricted driver's license that is used to facilitate the Ignition Interlock Requirement in a Vehicle. The time that the SIIRDL is required varies by offense, with an average length of 12 months. All IIDs must be installed by an approved company, and must be equipped with a camera, GPS and real-time reporting capabilities.

===== California =====
As of July 1, 2010, California implemented a pilot project for DUI sentencing, as a pilot program involving four counties under AB 91: Alameda, Los Angeles, Sacramento, and Tulare. Under the pilot project, if driving on a suspended license due to a DUI conviction, legally the court must impose an ignition interlock device requirement for up to a maximum of three years from the date of conviction. As of July 1, 2010, interlocks are required upon a DUI conviction in the four counties.

In the four counties under the AB 91 pilot program, all drivers convicted of a DUI offense are required to install IIDs in their vehicles as a condition to receive restricted driving privileges. First offenders convicted of drunk driving are required to install an ignition interlock device in their car for a period of five months and second offenders for a period of one year. Previously, this requirement was only required for third offenders and permitted for second offenders, and then for a three-year period. The California DMV has written guidelines to clear up some ambiguities in the law. Costs associated with ignition interlock devices include $70 – $150 for installation and fees in the range of $60 - $80 per month thereafter.

SB 598 shortens the amount of time certain repeat DUI offenders will have to wait before becoming eligible to apply for restricted California driving privileges. To receive the restricted license, though, these drivers will be required to meet certain criteria, such as the installation of an IID in their vehicles.

===== Georgia =====
First-time DUI convictions result in one year of a mandatory ignition interlock device.[42] A second conviction requires the IID be installed for at least five years, and on a third offense or greater, the requirement becomes at least ten years. Some convictions of negligent driving or reckless driving can require the convicted person to use an IID for a period of six months or longer.

===== Massachusetts =====
Starting January 1, 2006, drivers that had a second or subsequent operating under the influence offense and are eligible for a hardship license or for license reinstatement, are required to have an ignition interlock device attached to their motor vehicle, at their own expense.

===== New Jersey =====
Senate bill S824 decreases the length of driver’s license suspensions for drunk driving and refusing to submit to a breathalyzer test, but increases ignition interlock device requirements for these offenses. All first-time DWI offenders in the state of New Jersey are required to install an ignition interlock device on their vehicle. Also, if your license has been revoked for failure to submit to an alcohol test, you can regain your driving privileges if you install an ignition interlock.

===== New Mexico =====
Ignition interlocks are required for at least one year for all first-time DWI offenders; subsequent offenses require longer periods of installation. Also, if your license has been revoked for failure to submit to an alcohol test, you can regain your driving privileges if you install an ignition interlock.

===== New York =====
Don Prudente from DriveSafe Ignition Interlock of New York, Inc. states that as of August 15, 2010, New York state requires a person sentenced for Driving While Intoxicated have an ignition interlock device installed for at least 6 months on any vehicle they own or operate, and the driver have an "ignition interlock" restriction added to their driver license. This was mandated in honor of Leandra Rosado who died riding in a vehicle driven by a drunk driver.

===== North Carolina =====
A conviction of Driving While Impaired with a blood alcohol concentration of 0.15 or more or another conviction within the past seven years will require an ignition interlock device to be installed on the vehicle.

===== Rhode Island =====
As of 2015, Rhode Island courts have had the power to grant a hardship license to DUI offenders following the installation of an ignition interlock device. First-time DUI offenders can be required to use the IID for three months to one year. A second conviction can require IID usage for six months to two years. A third conviction can require IID usage for one to four years, while a third conviction within five years can require IID usage for two to 10 years.

===== Texas =====
As of Sept 1, 2015, anyone arrested for driving over the legal limit of .08% can opt for an IID restriction rather than wait for their driver's license suspension period to be up. For BAC levels .15% and over, Texas courts require IIDs, even for first time offenders.

===== Utah =====
Effective July 2, 2009, anyone convicted of a DUI, whether it be a first offense or a subsequent offense, will be required to have an ignition interlock device placed on their car — for 18 months for first time offense.

===== Virginia =====
Effective July 1, 2012, anyone who is convicted of DUI may drive only with an ignition interlock after the first offense, as a condition of a restricted license and is required to have an ignition interlock installed in each vehicle owned by or registered to him after a second offense for a period of six months. The bill also provides that the court may authorize a restricted license for travel to and from the interlock installer and a person can pre-qualify for an ignition interlock prior to conviction.

===== Washington =====
First-time DUI convictions result in one year of a mandatory ignition interlock device. A second conviction requires the IID be installed for at least five years, and on a third offense or greater, the requirement becomes at least ten years. Some convictions of negligent driving or reckless driving can require the convicted person to use an IID for a period of six months or longer.

== Countries who trialed, but have not adopted ==
In 2018, 53 systems were trialed on a fleet of buses in Italy. No rehabilitation programmes for offenders are in place nor any legislation on Alcohol Interlock programmes have been adopted.

The United Kingdom trialed the device in 2006 and decided not to proceed with wider use.

== Universal IID installation ==
Proposals have been made to install IIDs on all new vehicles, set to the legal limit for the driver. Some politicians in Sweden, Japan, Canada, United States, and other countries have called for such devices to be installed as standard equipment in all motor vehicles sold. Issues to be solved, besides consumer and voter acceptance, include difficulty in obtaining accurate measurements without inconvenience, and a need to achieve high reliability, in order not to interfere with vehicle usability.

== See also ==
- Immobiliser
- Smart Start, Inc.
