= Killing in the Name (film) =

2010 terrorism documentary

- Directed by: Jed Rothstein
- Produced by: Jed Rothstein, Jessica Van Garsse, Rory Kennedy, Liz Garbus
- Cinematography: Tom Hurwitz
- Edited by: Kate Taverna
- Music by: Mark Degli Antoni
- Production company: Moxie Firecracker Films
- Distributed by: HBO
- Release date: July 30, 2010 (DocuWeeks)
- Country: United States
- Language: English

Killing in the Name is a 2010 documentary film on Islamist terrorism. It was nominated for the Academy Award for Best Documentary (Short Subject) at the 83rd Academy Awards on January 25, 2011 but lost to Strangers No More.

The film showed in Los Angeles DocuWeeks on July 30, 2010.
