= Amy Hobby =

American film producer

Amy Hobby is an American film producer. She is best known for producing documentary What Happened, Miss Simone? that earned her Academy Award for Best Documentary Feature nomination at 88th Academy Awards and Grammy Award for Best Music Film at 58th Annual Grammy Awards.

== Filmography ==
- Paint It Black
- Coney Island Baby
- Love, Marilyn
- SPAA Fringe
- Secretary
- And Everything Is Going Fine
- Hamlet
- The Next Big Thing
- Lucky Them
- The Virginity Hit
- The Unexplained
- 1-800-On-Her-Own (Documentary film, 2024)
