= List of Netflix original films (since 2026) =

Netflix is an American global on-demand Internet streaming media provider, that has distributed a number of original programs, including original series, specials, miniseries, documentaries and films. Netflix's original films also include content that was first screened on cinematic release in other countries or given exclusive broadcast in other territories, and is then described as Netflix original content.

== Feature films ==
Title	Release date	Genre	Runtime	Language
People We Meet on Vacation	January 9, 2026	Romance	1 h 57 min	English
The Rip	January 16, 2026	Crime thriller	1 h 52 min	English
Cosmic Princess Kaguya!	January 22, 2026	Anime	2 h 22 min	Japanese
From the Ashes: The Pit	January 22, 2026	Drama	1 h 28 min	Arabic
The Big Fake	January 23, 2026	Crime drama	1 h 50 min	Italian
A Letter to My Youth	January 29, 2026	Drama	2 h 15 min	Indonesian
This Is I	February 10, 2026	Biopic	2 h 10 min	Japanese
State of Fear	February 11, 2026	Crime thriller	1 h 44 min	Portuguese
Joe's College Road Trip	February 13, 2026	Comedy	1 h 51 min	English
The Swedish Connection	February 19, 2026	Drama	1 h 42 min	Swedish
Firebreak	February 20, 2026	Psychological thriller	1 h 47 min	Spanish
Pavane	February 20, 2026	Romance	1 h 53 min	Korean
Accused	February 27, 2026	Drama	1 h 47 min	Hindi
Street Flow 3	March 4, 2026	Drama	1 h 52 min	French
War Machine	March 6, 2026	Science fiction action film	1 h 49 min	English
Made in Korea	March 12, 2026	Drama	1 h 53 min	Tamil
Peaky Blinders: The Immortal Man	March 20, 2026	Period crime drama	1 h 54 min	English
The Red Line	March 26, 2026	Crime drama	2 h 16 min	Thai
53 Sundays	March 27, 2026	Comedy drama	1 h 18 min	Spanish
Eat Pray Bark	April 1, 2026	Comedy	1 h 31 min	German
It Takes a Village	April 1, 2026	Comedy	1 h 36 min	Polish
The Giant Falls	April 1, 2026	Drama	1 h 42 min	Spanish
Feel My Voice	April 3, 2026	Comedy	2 h	Italian
18th Rose	April 9, 2026	Romance	2 h 11 min	Filipino
Thrash	April 10, 2026	Survival thriller	1 h 26 min	English
Toaster	April 15, 2026	Comedy	2 h 5 min	Hindi
180	April 17, 2026	Drama	1 h 34 min	English
Roommates	April 17, 2026	Comedy	1 h 47 min	English
Apex	April 24, 2026	Thriller	1 h 35 min	English
Je m'appelle Agneta	April 29, 2026	Comedy	1 h 53 min	Swedish
My Dearest Señorita	May 1, 2026	Romantic drama	1 h 56 min	Spanish
Swapped	May 1, 2026	CGI animated buddy comedy	1 h 41 min	English
My Dearest Assassin	May 7, 2026	Crime drama	2 h 8 min	Thai
Remarkably Bright Creatures	May 8, 2026	Mystery drama	1 h 53 min	English
Bride of the Year	May 15, 2026	Comedy	1 h 39 min	Afrikaans
Kartavya	May 15, 2026	Crime drama	1 h 48 min	Hindi
Ladies First	May 22, 2026	Romantic comedy	1 h 33 min	English
Maa Behen	June 4, 2026	Crime comedy	2 h 7 min	Hindi
The Marked Woman	June 5, 2026	Thriller	1 h 49 min	Spanish
Mexico 86	June 5, 2026	Sports comedy	1 h 37 min	Spanish
Office Romance	June 5, 2026	Romantic comedy	1 h 54 min	English
Colors of Evil: Black	June 10, 2026	Crime thriller	1 h 50 min	Polish
Color Book	June 19, 2026	Drama	1 h 39 min	English
Husbands in Action	June 19, 2026	Action comedy	1 h 49 min	Korean
Voicemails for Isabelle	June 19, 2026	Romantic comedy	1 h 58 min	English
Little Brother	June 26, 2026	Comedy	1 h 40 min	English
Enola Holmes 3	July 1, 2026	Mystery	1 h 48 min	English
Nothing to Lose	July 8, 2026	Drama	1 h 42 min	French
Ikka	July 10, 2026	Courtroom thriller	2 h 20 min	Hindi
Me Before Me	July 16, 2026	Coming of age family drama	2 h 7 min	Indonesian
Elize: Shadows of a Woman	July 22, 2026	Crime thriller	1 h 33 min	Portuguese
Love in Slow Motion	July 23, 2026	Romantic comedy	1 h 33 min	Arabic
The Debt Collector	July 23, 2026	Crime drama	2 h 14 min	Thai
72 Hours	July 24, 2026	Comedy	1 h 45 min	English
The Truthers	July 24, 2026	Drama	1 h 46 min	Spanish
The Last House	August 7, 2026	Science fiction horror	1 h 52 min	English
The Ribbon Hero	August 8, 2026	Anime	1 h 51 min	Japanese
This, That and Everything in Between	August 13, 2026	Family drama	1 h 52 min	Filipino
Don't Say Good Luck	August 14, 2026	Comedy	1 h 35 min	English
My Best Friend, His Girlfriend and Me	August 14, 2026	Comedy	1 h 38 min	German
Facing El Chapo	August 21, 2026	Drama	1 h 32 min	Spanish
Pyaar Prema Kalyanam	August 21, 2026	Romantic comedy	2 h 6 min	Tamil
The Secret Woman	August 28, 2026	Psychological thriller	1 h 58 min	Danish
The Whisper Man	August 28, 2026	Crime thriller	1 h 54 min	English
Gandhari	September 3, 2026	Action thriller	1 h 56 min	Hindi
Why Did I Get Married Again?	September 9, 2026	Comedy	1 h 51 min	English
Call My Agent! The Movie	September 10, 2026	Comedy	1 h 59 min	French
Go Team!	September 11, 2026	Comedy	1 h 33 min	Spanish
Best of the Best	September 18, 2026	Comedy	1 h 52 min	English
Lust Stories 3	September 18, 2026	Anthology	2 h 44 min	Hindi
Unabomber	September 25, 2026	Biopic thriller	1 h 40 min	English
Crazy Rich, Incredibly Broke	October 1, 2026	Comedy	1 h 38 min	Arabic
Doing Life	October 2, 2026	Drama	1 h 48 min	English
Less of a Stranger	October 7, 2026	Drama	2 h 6 min	Polish
Animals	October 9, 2026	Crime thriller	1 h 48 min	English
The Storm	October 15, 2026	Dark comedy	1 h 41 min	Swedish
Seriously Single Too	October 16, 2026	Comedy	1 h 39 min	English
Therapy Done Right	October 16, 2026	Comedy	1 h 38 min	Spanish
Gajab Raat	October 23, 2026	Crime thriller	2 h 3 min	Hindi
Surviving Hurricane Otis	October 23, 2026	Drama	1 h 37 min	Spanish
You, Me, Us	October 29, 2026	Romantic drama	1 h 47 min	Italian
Collision Course	October 30, 2026	Thriller	1 h 46 min	Spanish
The Birthday Gift	October 30, 2026	Comedy	1 h 29 min	German
A Dog's Perfect Christmas	November 4, 2026	Christmas drama	1 h 41 min	English
Dilwali Diwali	November 5, 2026	Family drama	1 h 1 min	Hindi
One Year to Live, Buy a Man	November 5, 2026	Romantic drama	1 h 49 min	Japanese
Overacting	November 5, 2026	Action comedy	1 h 56 min	Thai
Possible Love	November 6, 2026	Drama	2 h 46 min	Korean
The Good Lawyer	November 9, 2026	Legal thriller	2 h	French
The Gospel of Christmas	November 11, 2026	Christmas drama	1 h 44 min	English
Allen	November 12, 2026	Science fiction family film	1 h 46 min	English
The Christmas Switch	November 12, 2026	Christmas romantic comedy	1 h 43 min	Swedish
Never Surrender	November 12, 2026	Crime thriller	2 h 19 min	Indonesian
Heartland	November 13, 2026	Mystery thriller	1 h 53 min	English
Guarding Stars	November 18, 2026	Christmas romantic comedy	1 h 49 min	English
On Behalf of My Son	November 20, 2026	Drama	2 h 26 min	Portuguese
Steps	November 20, 2026	CGI animated musical fantasy comedy	1 h 46 min	English
Awaiting release
The Mosquito Bowl	November 25, 2026	War drama sports film	2 h 8 min	English
The Child	November 27, 2026	Drama	1 h 46 min	Spanish
The Hunchback, Soul of Paris	November 27, 2026	Historical thriller	1 h 46 min	French
In a Holidaze	December 2, 2026	Christmas romantic comedy	1 h 47 min	English
My Crazy Feminist Girlfriend	December 3, 2026	Romantic drama	1 h 38 min	Japanese
Secrets	December 3, 2026	Drama	2 h 10 min	Indonesian
Permafrost	December 10, 2026	Action comedy	1 h 44 min	Swedish
Bad Day	December 11, 2026	Action comedy	1 h 42 min	English
Proxies	December 11, 2026	Crime drama	2 h 6 min	Spanish
The Champs	December 15, 2026	Comedy	TBA	Italian
Give Me Some Sugah	December 16, 2026	Drama	1 h 36 min	English
Another Disaster Holiday	December 18, 2026	Comedy	TBA	English
Ray Gunn	December 18, 2026	CGI animated science fiction noir	1 h 59 min	English
The Further Mis-Adventures of Cliff Booth	December 23, 2026	Comedy drama	2 h 20 min	English
The Take	January 15, 2027	Heist film	TBA	English
Narnia: The Magician's Nephew	April 2, 2027	Fantasy	TBA	English
Charlie vs. The Chocolate Factory	December 22, 2027	CGI animated fantasy	TBA	English

== Documentaries ==
Title	Release date	Runtime	Language
Kidnapped: Elizabeth Smart	January 21, 2026	1 h 31 min	English
Miracle: The Boys of '80	January 30, 2026	1 h 41 min	English
The Investigation of Lucy Letby	February 4, 2026	1 h 34 min	English
Queen of Chess	February 6, 2026	1 h 34 min	English
Matter of Time	February 9, 2026	1 h 46 min	English
Louis Theroux: Inside the Manosphere	March 11, 2026	1 h 31 min	English
Barbara – Becoming Shirin David	March 13, 2026	1 h 31 min	German
The Plastic Detox	March 16, 2026	1 h 32 min	English
The Rise of the Red Hot Chili Peppers: Our Brother, Hillel	March 20, 2026	1 h 35 min	English
BTS: The Return	March 27, 2026	1 h 33 min	Korean
Untold: The Death & Life of Lamar Odom	March 31, 2026	1 h 21 min	English
The Truth and Tragedy of Moriah Wilson	April 3, 2026	1 h 37 min	English
Untold: Chess Mates	April 7, 2026	1 h 15 min	English
Noah Kahan: Out of Body	April 13, 2026	1 h 35 min	English
Untold: Jail Blazers	April 14, 2026	1 h 10 min	English
A Gorilla Story: Told by David Attenborough	April 17, 2026	1 h 17 min	English
Beyond the Game: Samurai 2026 World Baseball Classic	April 20, 2026	1 h 59 min	Japanese
Untold: The Shooting at Hawthorne Hill	April 21, 2026	1 h 13 min	English
Lainey Wilson: Keepin' Country Cool	April 22, 2026	1 h 23 min	English
Yiya Murano: Death at Tea Time	April 23, 2026	1 h 44 min	Spanish
Countdown: Rousey vs. Carano	May 6, 2026	42 min	English
Marty, Life Is Short	May 12, 2026	1 h 41 min	English
Untold UK: Jamie Vardy	May 12, 2026	1 h 30 min	English
The Bus: A French Football Mutiny	May 13, 2026	1 h 21 min	French
The Crash	May 15, 2026	1 h 34 min	English
Untold UK: Liverpool's Miracle of Istanbul	May 19, 2026	1 h 18 min	English
Untold UK: Vinnie Jones	May 26, 2026	1 h 17 min	English
Room to Move	May 27, 2026	1 h 52 min	English
Emi Martínez: The Kid Who Stops Time	May 28, 2026	1 h 18 min	Spanish
Instadocs: Alex Murdaugh, Unconvicted	May 30, 2026	30 min	English
The Murder of Rachel Nickell	June 4, 2026	1 h 36 min	English
Poldi	June 4, 2026	1 h 34 min	German
USA 94: Brazil's Return to Glory	June 7, 2026	1 h 26 min	Portuguese
Maternal Instinct	June 12, 2026	1 h 36 min	English
Chris & Martina: The Final Set	June 26, 2026	1 h 37 min	English
Miguel Ángel Blanco: The 48 Hours That Changed Spain	July 10, 2026	1 h 34 min	Spanish
Shipwrecked: Nightmare at Sea	July 10, 2026	1 h 29 min	English
A Toxic Love Story	July 23, 2026	1 h 30 min	English
Instadocs: The Prediction Games	July 26, 2026	36 min	English
Big Chicken: A Fast Food Conspiracy	August 5, 2026	1 h 38 min	English
Inside the Trustor Scandal	August 5, 2026	1 h 42 min	Swedish
A Child of My Own	August 13, 2026	1 h 36 min	Spanish
Freefall: A Reckoning for Boeing	August 19, 2026	1 h 35 min	English
Chompoo: Lost & Forgotten	August 20, 2026	1 h 25 min	Thai
Untold: The Testimony of Vince Young	August 25, 2026	1 h 18 min	English
The Last Salute	August 26, 2026	1 h 19 min	English
Untold Raygun: Breaking Badly	September 1, 2026	1 h 12 min	English
Fito Páez: The World Within a Song	September 3, 2026	1 h 52 min	Spanish
Instadocs: The Decoy Plane	September 4, 2026	28 min	English
Untold Mr. T: I Pity the Fool	September 8, 2026	48 min	English
The Widower: 'Til Death Do Us Part	September 30, 2026	1 h 31 min	English
Schumacher '94 – The Birth of a Legend	October 2, 2026	1 h 47 min	German
Who Is Martin Mull?	October 7, 2026	1 h 34 min	English
Instadocs: AI Gone Wild	October 12, 2026	27 min	English
Norm: The Tale of Norm Macdonald	October 16, 2026	2 h 6 min	English
The Disciple: A Wu-Tang Fable	October 16, 2026	1 h 46 min	English
Paralyzed by Hope: The Maria Bamford Story	October 23, 2026	1 h 56 min	English
Instadocs: Jane Doe v. Cornell	October 29, 2026	35 min	English
SCTV: The Greatest Show You've Never Heard Of	October 30, 2026	1 h 28 min	English
Ninho: Fame Ain't Worth It	November 4, 2026	1 h 38 min	French
High End: The Watch Theft Ring	November 5, 2026	1 h 35 min	Spanish
Unprotected: Murder in Galicia	November 6, 2026	1 h 5 min	Spanish
Avedon	November 11, 2026	1 h 44 min	English
The Unthinkable Daughter	November 11, 2026	1 h 40 min	Portuguese
Russell Brand: Open Secret	November 13, 2026	1 h 25 min	English
Primetime Preacher$	November 20, 2026	1 h 55 min	English
Awaiting release
Chiara Ferragni: Front Facing	November 23, 2026	TBA	Italian
One Last Order	November 24, 2026	22 min	English
Rob Lowe: The Outsider	November 24, 2026	TBA	English
Tyson Fury	November 27, 2026	1 h 45 min	English
an open field	December 1, 2026	39 min	English
Marcos: Another World Is Possible	December 2, 2026	2 h 11 min	Spanish
Jão: Tales from the Void	December 3, 2026	TBA	Portuguese
14th	December 4, 2026	1 h 10 min	English
Who Killed the Banker's Widow?	December 4, 2026	1 h 39 min	Spanish
The Baddest Speechwriter of All	December 8, 2026	30 min	English
Jean-Michel Basquiat	December 11, 2026	1 h 38 min	English
A Deadly Affair: The Pamela Smart Story	December 16, 2026	TBA	English
Untold: One Giant Upset	December 21, 2026	TBA	English
Dolphins: My Close Encounter	December 28, 2026	TBA	English

== Specials ==
These programs are one-time original events or supplementary content related to original films.

Title	Release date	Genre	Runtime	Language
Skyscraper Live	January 25, 2026	Extreme sports event	1 h 56 min	English
The Actor Awards Presented by SAG-AFTRA	March 1, 2026	Awards ceremony	2 h 34 min	English
Harry Styles. One Night in Manchester.	March 8, 2026	Concert	1 h 37 min	English
BTS The Comeback Live Arirang	March 21, 2026	Concert	1 h 5 min	Korean
MLB Opening Night: Yankees vs. Giants	March 25, 2026	Sporting event	4 h 30 min	English
Tyson Fury vs. Arslanbek Makhmudov	April 11, 2026	Sporting event	4 h 24 min	English
Supernova Strikers: Genesis	April 26, 2026	Sporting event	4 h 17 min	Spanish
Ronda Rousey vs. Gina Carano	May 17, 2026	Sporting event	3 h 1 min	English
2026 MLB Home Run Derby	July 13, 2026	Sporting event	4 h 7 min	English
MLB Field of Dreams: Phillies vs. Twins	August 13, 2026	Sporting event	4 h 31 min	English
NFL Melbourne Game: 49ers vs Rams	September 11, 2026	Sporting event	5 h 35 min	English
Beat Luke Littler	October 30, 2026	Sporting event	2 h 34 min	English
Awaiting release
NFL Netflix Gameday: Thanksgiving Eve, Packers vs. Rams	November 25, 2026	Sporting event	TBA	English
Tyson Fury vs. Anthony Joshua	December 11, 2026	Sporting event	TBA	English
NFL Netflix Gameday: Christmas, Bills vs. Broncos	December 25, 2026	Sporting event	TBA	English
NFL Netflix Gameday: Christmas, Packers vs. Bears	December 25, 2026	Sporting event	TBA	English
Countdown Concert 2026–2027 Starto to World	December 31, 2026	Concert	TBA	Japanese

== Shorts ==
These are programs that have a runtime of less than 20 minutes.

Title	Release date	Genre	Runtime	Language
The Singers	February 13, 2026	Short musical comedy film	18 min	English

== Upcoming ==
=== Feature films ===
Title	Release date	Genre	Runtime	Language
Crappy Birthday to You	December 2026	Comedy	TBA	Spanish
Mission: Cross 2	December 2026	Spy action comedy	TBA	Korean
Good Sex	Late 2026	Romantic comedy	1 h 50 min	English
City Hunter 2	2027	Action comedy	TBA	Japanese
Return to You	2027	Romantic dramedy	TBA	English
Saturn Return	2027	Romantic drama	TBA	English
Jack of Spades	Late 2027	Gothic mystery	TBA	English

=== Documentaries ===
Title	Release date	Runtime	Language
The Trust	December 2026	TBA	English
Untitled Jessica Simpson documentary	2027	TBA	English

== Undated films ==
=== Feature films ===
Title	Genre	Runtime	Language
35 días	Drama	TBA	Spanish
The 99'ers	Sports drama	TBA	English
2034	Science fiction thriller	TBA	English
Bad Bridgets	Historical drama	TBA	English
Better Than the Movies	Romantic comedy	TBA	English
The Big Fix	Crime thriller	TBA	English
Black Box	Thriller	TBA	English
The Borrowed Life of Frederick Fife	Comedy drama	TBA	English
The Boy in the Iron Box	Horror	TBA	English
The Brotherhood	Crime drama	TBA	English
Brutal	Crime drama	TBA	Spanish
The Cackling of the Dodos	Crime drama	TBA	English
Canopy	Horror	TBA	English
Chapapote	Drama	TBA	Spanish
The Chaperone	Comedy	TBA	English
Cold Zero	Action thriller	TBA	English
Crazy Taxi	Comedy	TBA	English
Cujo	Horror	TBA	English
Dad Camp	Comedy drama	TBA	English
Dochabi	Historical drama	TBA	Korean
Dogfight	Action	TBA	English
El enemigo del pueblo	Dark comedy	TBA	Spanish
Eloise at the Plaza	Family film	TBA	English
Extraction 3	Action	TBA	English
Fast and Loose	Action	TBA	English
The Fifth Wheel	Comedy	TBA	English
Fight for '84	Sports drama	TBA	English
The Generals	Political drama	TBA	Korean
The Getaway	Action	TBA	English
Grown Ups 3	Comedy	TBA	English
Gundam	Science fiction	TBA	English
Hurt People	Thriller	TBA	English
The Inbetweeners 3	Comedy	TBA	English
An Innocent Girl	Psychological thriller	TBA	English
Just Picture It	Romantic comedy	TBA	English
La cuidadora	Thriller mystery	TBA	Spanish
La Regenta	Drama	TBA	Spanish
The Last Mrs. Parrish	Psychological thriller	TBA	English
The Leading Man	Action comedy	TBA	English
Luther 3	Mystery	TBA	English
Maelstrom	Action	TBA	English
A Matter of Time	Fantasy drama	TBA	English
Meet the Khumalos 2	Comedy	TBA	English
Monsanto	Legal drama	TBA	English
Mrs. Claus	Christmas comedy	TBA	English
My Hero Academia	Action	TBA	English
Nineteen Steps	Drama	TBA	English
No Way Out	War	TBA	English
One Attempt Remaining	Comedy	TBA	English
Operation TAP	Suspense thriller	TBA	Portuguese
Patricia	Drama	TBA	Spanish
The Pilgrimage	Drama	TBA	Portuguese
Play Dead	Thriller	TBA	English
Positano	Romantic thriller	TBA	English
Protecting Jared	Action comedy	TBA	English
The Rancher	Thriller	TBA	English
Rata	Comedy	TBA	Spanish
Scope	Thriller	TBA	English
The Seven Husbands of Evelyn Hugo	Drama	TBA	English
Six Minutes to Freedom	War	TBA	English
Somewhere Out There	Science fiction	TBA	English
South Pole Santa	Christmas family film	TBA	English
Stradivarius	Drama	TBA	English
Stranger Than Heaven	Action crime drama	TBA	English
Strangers	Drama	TBA	English
Team Hoyt	Sports biopic	TBA	English
Time Out	Drama	TBA	English
Tygo	Action thriller	TBA	Korean
Uncorked	Romantic comedy	TBA	English
Untitled 13 Going on 30 remake	Romantic comedy	TBA	English
Untitled BioShock film	Science fiction	TBA	English
Untitled Endurance film	Historical drama	TBA	English
Untitled Ghostbusters film	CGI animated supernatural-comedy	TBA	English
Untitled Jessica Alba film	Comedy	TBA	English
Untitled Jorge R. Gutierrez film	CGI animated	TBA	English
Untitled Henry Cavill/Kevin Hart movie	Action-comedy	TBA	English
Untitled KPop Demon Hunters sequel	CGI animated fantasy	TBA	English
Untitled Michael Werwie film	Thriller	TBA	English
Untitled The Mitchells vs. the Machines sequel	CGI animated science fiction	TBA	English
Untitled Sesame Street film	Comedy family film	TBA	English
Untitled Straight Up Creative film	Animation	TBA	English
Walk the Blue Fields	Romantic drama	TBA	English
War Machines	Science fiction	TBA	English
Women Like Us	Comedy	TBA	English
Yeti	Horror	TBA	English

=== Documentaries ===
Title	Runtime	Language
Canelo Álvarez	TBA	Spanish
Keiko	TBA	Spanish
L'Affaire OM/VA	TBA	French
Liliana's Invincible Summer	TBA	Spanish
My Big Day	TBA	English
Untitled Jon & Kate Plus 8 documentary	TBA	English
Untitled Nathan Carman documentary	TBA	English
Untitled Olivia Newton-John documentary	TBA	English
