= Robert Coles (psychiatrist) =

American psychiatrist (1928–2026)

- Born: October 12, 1928; Boston, Massachusetts
- Died: June 4, 2026 (aged 97); Lincoln, Massachusetts
- Education: Harvard University
- Occupations: Author, Child psychiatrist, Academic

Martin Robert Coles (October 12, 1928 – June 4, 2026) was an American author, child psychiatrist and academic who was a professor at Harvard University.

== Biography ==
=== Early life and education ===
Martin Robert Coles was born in Boston, Massachusetts, on October 12, 1928, to Philip Coles, an immigrant from Leeds, England, United Kingdom, and Sandra Young Coles, originally from Sioux City, Iowa. He had a Jewish and Catholic heritage on his father's side, and an Episcopalian background on his mother's side. Robert attended Boston Latin School, where he played tennis, ran track and edited the school literary magazine. In 1946, he entered Harvard College, where he studied English literature and helped to edit the undergraduate literary magazine, The Harvard Advocate. He graduated magna cum laude and earned Phi Beta Kappa honors in 1950.

Coles originally intended to become a teacher or professor but as part of his senior honors thesis, he interviewed the poet and physician William Carlos Williams, who promptly persuaded him to go into medicine. He studied medicine at Columbia University College of Physicians and Surgeons, graduating in 1954. After residency training at the University of Chicago Pritzker School of Medicine, Coles moved on to psychiatric residencies at Massachusetts General Hospital in Boston and McLean Hospital in Belmont, Massachusetts.

Knowing that he was to be called into the U.S. Armed Forces under the Doctor Draft, Coles joined the Air Force in 1958 and was assigned the rank of captain. His field of specialization was psychiatry, his intention eventually to sub-specialize in child psychiatry. He served as chief of neuropsychiatric services at Keesler Air Force Base in Biloxi, Mississippi, and was honorably discharged in 1960. He returned to Boston and finished his child psychiatry training at the Children's Hospital. In July 1960, he was married to Jane Hollowell, and the couple moved to New Orleans.

=== Career ===
==== Ruby Bridges ====
In New Orleans In 1960, Coles witnessed six-year-old Ruby Bridges, protected by U.S. Federal marshals, "walking through a screaming mob to integrate a public school", in the words of the New York Times. He volunteered to support and counsel Ruby and her family during this difficult period. Coles wrote a series of articles for The Atlantic Monthly on Ruby and other black children, who, along with their white classmates and their families, were targets of daily public protests, intimidation, and even death threats during the desegregation of public schools in New Orleans.

These articles led to his first book, Children of Crisis: A Study of Courage and Fear, and ultimately to his decision to develop that book into a series of books documenting how children and their parents deal with profound change, a series that won him the Pulitzer prize in 1973. In 1995 he returned to his original material and wrote The Story of Ruby Bridges, a popular children's book, published by Scholastic Corporation.

==== Other works ====
In addition to working with children in New Orleans and Atlanta, Coles wrote non-technical articles for a number of national publications, including The Atlantic Monthly, The New Republic, Saturday Review, and The Times of London. By 1969, Coles wrote in-depth profiles for The New Yorker and contributed regular columns to The New Republic, New Oxford Review, America, and the American Poetry Review.

At the urging of Erik Erikson, in 1963 Coles became affiliated with the University Health Services at Harvard as a research psychiatrist. Gradually, he began teaching in the Harvard Medical School, eventually becoming Professor of Psychiatry and Medical Humanities in 1977. He taught courses in various schools across Harvard University, including the Faculty of Arts and Sciences, the Business School, the Law School, the Extension School and the School of Education, where in 1995 he was given a newly established position as James Agee Professor of Social Ethics. He came to teach courses not only in the moral, spiritual, and social sensibilities of children but also in those phenomena generally, especially as expressed in stories, both literary fictions and oral narratives, and as affected by conditions of poverty and social injustice. As a longtime professor, Coles has influenced generations of Harvard undergraduates and graduate students. In 2007, Harvard University named an annual Call of Service lecture in honor of Coles.

His work has been recognized with numerous awards, including election to the American Academy of Arts and Sciences in 1971, a Pulitzer Prize for General Nonfiction in 1973 for his series of books Children of Crisis, a MacArthur Award in 1981, the Presidential Medal of Freedom in 1998 and the National Humanities Medal in 2001. He later co-founded the magazine DoubleTake, which documented the lives of ordinary people with photographs, articles, essays, poetry, and short stories. The magazine won several awards, including the 1998 National Magazine Award for Editorial Excellence in the category of General Excellence.

Many of Coles's works draw heavily on quoted conversations with ordinary people, as well as insights from prominent thinkers and leaders—often people Coles has encountered personally in his career—such as William Carlos Williams, Dorothy Day, Walker Percy, William Shawn, Anna Freud, Paul Tillich, Erik Erikson and Robert F. Kennedy. Starting with the Children of Crisis series, Coles's approach to his subjects involves a difficult balancing act at the heart of the documentary enterprise. His methods combine techniques of participant observation (tape recordings, field notes, drawings, etc.), clinical interpretation, academic social research, and literary narrative. Coles has never been diffident about the economic, social, and racial injustices he has observed in the field. He is a spokesperson for his subjects, a sounding board for their public voices. Coles describes his own literary methods and goals as an effort "to blend poetic insight with a craft and unite ultimately the rational and the intuitive, the aloof stance of the scholar with the passion and affection of the friend who cares and is moved". (The Mind's Fate, p. 10)

Coles authored more than 80 books and 1,300 articles, nearly all of them centrally concerned with human moral, spiritual, and social sensibility and reasoning, mainly in children but also in adults, writers especially, including the novelist Walker Percy (who dedicated his final novel, The Thanatos Syndrome, to Coles), the poet William Carlos Williams, writer James Agee, novelist Flannery O'Connor and others, such as Dorothy Day, Dietrich Bonhoeffer, Simone Weil and Dorothea Lange.

==== Controversy ====
In a 2003 review of Coles's book on musician Bruce Springsteen, music critic David Hajdu questioned the truthfulness and accuracy of Coles's reports of the opinions on Springsteen held by various people, suggesting that some source quotations may have been fabricated:

The fact that William Carlos Williams and Walker Percy had such extensive conversations with Robert Coles on the subjects of the New Jersey pop singers Frank Sinatra and Bruce Springsteen and that those discussions yielded insights so parallel and neatly suited to Coles's own take on Springsteen is incredible—utterly incredible. I was not there to overhear them, of course, and it is impossible to check with Williams and Percy, or with the late Erikson and Shawn, whom Coles's other deceased sources quotes in his book's opening sections. But I did ask Will Percy about the comments on Springsteen that Coles attributes to his uncle, and he called them "outrageous". Walker Percy "definitely didn't talk like that", according to his nephew.

While "the facts of his subjects' lives are indisputable", one Coles scholar cautions that "some distortion is perhaps inevitable given Coles's method and purposes and expectations of his readers. The portraits are not written as true documentary accounts of the lives of his subjects but are presented as composite views of many [subjects] designed to highlight certain features of American social life neglected in other accounts of the poor. And if they are not true, neither are they false. In some respects... they have the status of fiction based very firmly on the transcription of life. They examine the range of human possibility beyond category and social stereotype".

=== Death ===
He died in Lincoln, Massachusetts, on June 4, 2026, at the age of 97.

== Personal life ==
In 1960, Coles married Jane Erin Hallowell, a graduate of Radcliffe College and a high-school teacher of English and history. They had three sons. Coles and his wife co-authored the 1978 book Women of Crisis: Lives of struggle and hope. She died of a brain tumor in 1993.

Coles was a practicing Catholic.

== Legacy ==
Coles's personal and professional papers are archived at the University of North Carolina, Chapel Hill, and at Michigan State University.

== Honors ==
- Pulitzer Prize for General Nonfiction, 1973
- Presidential Medal of Freedom, 1998
- National Humanities Medal, 2001

== Bibliography ==
- A Study in Courage and Fear, Volume 1 of Children of Crisis (Boston: Atlantic-Little, Brown, 1967)
- Dead End School, with illustrations by Norman Rockwell (Boston: Little, Brown, 1968)
- The Image Is You, children's photos organized by Donald Erceg with text by Coles (Boston: Houghton Mifflin Company, 1969)
- Still Hungry in America, with photos by Al Clayton (New York: World Publishing Company, 1969)
- The Grass Pipe, young adult novel (Boston: Little, Brown, 1969)
- Erik H. Erikson: the Growth of His Work (Boston: Little, Brown, 1970)
- Uprooted Children: The Early Life of Migrant Farm Workers (Pittsburgh: University of Pittsburgh Press, 1970) ISBN 0-8229-3192-3
- Migrants, Sharecroppers, Mountaineers, Volume 2 of Children of Crisis (Boston: Little, Brown, 1971)
- The South Goes North, Volume 3 of Children of Crisis (Boston: Little, Brown, 1971)
- The Middle Americans; Proud and Uncertain, with photos by Jon Erikson (Boston: Little, Brown, 1971)
- Farewell to the South (Boston: Little, Brown, 1972) ISBN 0-316-15158-0
- The Buses Roll, with photos by Carol Baldwin and Peter T. Whitney (New York: Norton, 1974) ISBN 0-393-05529-9
- William Carlos Williams: The knack of survival in America (New Brunswick, New Jersey: Rutgers University Press, 1975) ISBN 0-8135-0800-2
- The Mind's Fate: Ways of Seeing Psychiatry and Psychoanalysis, (Boston : Little, Brown, 1975). ISBN 0-316-15179-3
- Eskimos, Indians, Chicanos, Volume 4 of Children of Crisis (Boston: Little, Brown, 1977) ISBN 0-316-15162-9
- The Privileged Ones: The Well-off and the Rich in America, Volume 5 of Children of Crisis (Boston: Little, Brown, 1977) ISBN 0-316-15149-1
- A Festering Sweetness: Poems of American People (Pittsburgh: University of Pittsburgh Press, 1978) ISBN 0-8229-5290-4
- The Last and First Eskimos, with photos by Alex Harris (Boston: New York Graphic Society, 1978) ISBN 0-8212-0737-7
- Women of Crisis: Lives of struggle and hope, with Jane Hallowell Coles (New York: Delacorte Press, 1978) ISBN 0-440-09536-0
- Walker Percy: An American Search (Boston: Little, Brown, 1979) ISBN 0-316-15160-2
- Flannery O'Connor's South (Baton Rouge: Louisiana State University Press, 1980) ISBN 0-8071-0655-0
- I Will Always Stay Me: Writings of Migrant Children, edited by Sherry Kafka and Robert Coles (Austin: Texas Monthly Press, 1982) ISBN 0-932012-27-2
- Photographs of a Lifetime, photos by Dorothea Lange with an essay by Coles (Millerton, New York: Aperture, 1982) ISBN 0-89381-100-9
- The Doctor Stories, by William Carlos Williams, compiled and with an introduction by Robert Coles (New York: New Directions Publishing, 1984)
- The Moral Life of Children (Boston: Atlantic Monthly Press, 1986) ISBN 0-87113-034-3
- The Political Life of Children (Boston: Atlantic Monthly Press, 1986)
- Dorothy Day: A Radical Devotion (Reading, Massachusetts: Addison-Wesley, 1987) ISBN 0-201-02829-8
- Simone Weil; A Modern Pilgrimage (Reading, Massachusetts: Addison-Wesley, 1987) ISBN 0-201-02205-2
- Harvard Diary: Reflections of the Sacred and the Secular (New York: Crossroad, 1988)
- Times of Surrender: Selected Essays (Iowa City: University of Iowa Press, 1988) ISBN 0-87745-188-5
- The Call of Stories: Teaching and the Moral Imagination (Boston: Houghton Mifflin Company, 1989) ISBN 0-395-42935-8
- Rumors of Separate Worlds: Poems (Iowa City: University of Iowa Press, 1989) ISBN 0-87745-258-X
- The Spiritual Life of Children (Boston: Houghton Mifflin Company, 1990) ISBN 0-395-55999-5
- Anna Freud: The Dream of Psychoanalysis (Reading, Massachusetts: Addison-Wesley, 1992) ISBN 0-201-57707-0
- Their Eyes Meeting the World: The Drawings and Paintings of Children, edited by Margaret Sartor (Boston: Houghton Mifflin Company, 1992) ISBN 0-395-61129-6
- The Call of Service: A Witness to Idealism (Boston: Houghton Mifflin Company, 1993) ISBN 0-395-71084-7
- The Story of Ruby Bridges, illustrated by George Ford (New York: Scholastic, 1995) ISBN 0-590-43967-7
- Doing Documentary Work (New York: Oxford University Press, 1997) ISBN 0-19-511629-1
- The Moral Intelligence of Children (New York: Random House, 1997) ISBN 0-679-44811-X
- Old and On Their Own, with photos by Alex Harris and Thomas Roma (New York: Center for Documentary Studies/Norton, 1997) ISBN 0-393-04606-0
- The Youngest Parents: Teenage pregnancy as it shapes lives, with Robert E. Coles, Daniel A. Coles, Michael H. Coles, and photos by Jocelyn Lee and John Moses (New York: Center for Documentary Studies, 1997) ISBN 0-393-04082-8
- The Secular Mind (Princeton: Princeton University Press, 1999) ISBN 0-691-05805-9
- The Erik Erikson Reader, selected and edited by Coles (New York: Norton, 2000) ISBN 0-393-04845-4
- Lives of Moral Leadership (New York: Random House, 2000) ISBN 0-375-50108-8
- Growing Up Poor: A Literary Anthology, edited by Robert Coles, Randy Testa, and Michael Coles (New York: New Press, 2001) ISBN 1-56584-623-0
- A Life in Medicine: A Literary Anthology, edited by Coles and Randy Testa (New York: New Press, 2002) ISBN 1-56584-729-6
- When They Were Young: A photographic retrospective of childhood from the Library of Congress (Carlsbad, California: Kales Press/Library of Congress, 2002) ISBN 0-9670076-5-8
- Bruce Springsteen's America: The People Listening, a Poet Singing (New York: Random House, 2003) ISBN 0-375-50559-8
- Teaching Stories: An Anthology on the Power of Learning and Literature, selected by Coles (New York: Modern Library, 2004) ISBN 0-8129-7169-8
- Minding the Store: Great Writing About Business from Tolstoy to Now, edited by Coles and Albert LaFarge (New York: The New Press, 2008) ISBN 978-1-59558-355-0

Contributions

- Steve Lehman The Tibetans: A Struggle to Survive, pgs. 14–15, Introduction by Robert Coles (New York: How Town / Umbrage, 1998) ISBN 0-944092-65-9
- Steve Lehman, Mark Bailey, and Rory Kennedy, American Hollow, pp. 6–7, foreword by Robert Coles (New York: Bulfinch Press, 1999) ISBN 0-8212-2631-2.
- Michael Johnston, In the Deep Heart's Core, Foreword by Robert Coles (New York: Grove Press, 2002) ISBN 978-0802117212

== Notes ==
- Keillor, Garrison. The Writer's Almanac. October 12, 2006.
- London, Scott. "A Way of Seeing: The Work of Robert Coles". Scott London. (Retrieved October 19, 2006).
