= Mark Bailey (writer) =

American writer based in Los Angeles

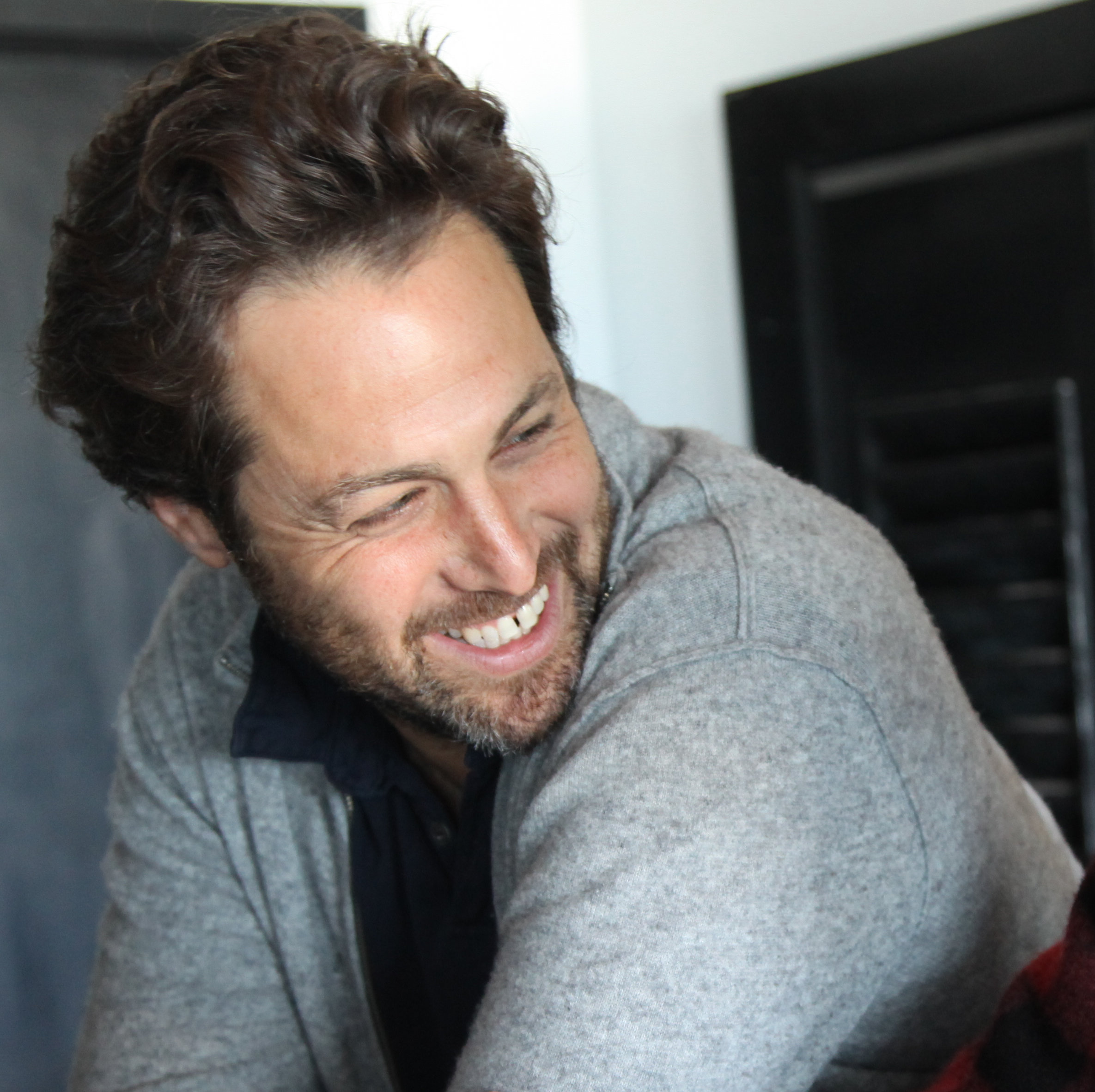
- Born: Mark Daniel Bailey; November 21, 1968 (age 58); Elizabeth, New Jersey, U.S.
- Education: University of Vermont (1991)
- Occupations: Writer, filmmaker
- Spouse: Rory Kennedy (m. 1999)
- Children: 3
- Writing career
- Years active: 1999–present
- Website: www.markbaileywriter.com

Mark Daniel Bailey (born November 21, 1968) is an American writer, best known for his documentary films, including Last Days in Vietnam (2014), Downfall: The Case Against Boeing (2022), and The Volcano: Rescue from Whakaari (2022). Bailey, together with his wife, filmmaker Rory Kennedy, own Moxie Films, a documentary film production company. The company produces documentaries "for broadcast and cable networks, including Netflix, HBO, PBS, A&E, National Geographic, Showtime, Discovery Channel, MTV, TLC, Lifetime Television, the Oxygen Network, and the Sundance Channel as well as for educational foundations and philanthropic organizations."

== Life and career ==
Mark Bailey was born in Elizabeth, New Jersey, and grew up in the nearby town of Summit. He graduated from the University of Vermont in 1991 and subsequently attended Georgetown University, where he studied for a master's degree in English. He moved to New York City in 1997 and began writing in 1999.

== Films ==
In 1999, Bailey wrote the film American Hollow, about "the complex ties that bind [an] Appalachian family to a cycle of deprivation," which was nominated for an Independent Spirit Award and a Primetime Emmy for best documentary. In 2003, he wrote Pandemic: Facing AIDS, a "five-part documentary series about the lives of people dealing with the disease in various parts of the world." For his work, he was nominated for a Primetime Emmy for outstanding writing. Both American Hollow and Pandemic were broadcast on HBO.

Subsequently, Bailey was one of the producers of Torte Bluma, a 2005 dramatic short film starring Stellan Skarsgård and Simon McBurney. The film, which won "best of the festival" at the Palm Springs International ShortFest in 2005 and was nominated for best narrative short at the Tribeca Film Festival in 2006, was distributed by Phase 4 films as part of a compilation called Guilty Hearts.

In 2007, Bailey cowrote (with Jack Youngelson) the film Ghosts of Abu Ghraib, "an examination of the prisoner abuse scandal involving U.S. soldiers and detainees at Iraq's Abu Ghraib prison in the fall of 2003," which was nominated for six Primetime Emmys, one of which it won—for best nonfiction special.

In 2011, Bailey was hired by Marvel Studios to write the script for Black Panther, a narrative feature film based on the African comic-book character of the same name. In 2015, Joe Robert Cole was hired to take over the script, and Marvel's film was released on February 16, 2018. Bailey commented, “Given that the film would go on to become the third-highest-grossing film in U.S. history, it would be hard to argue that Marvel’s decision to replace me was unwise.”

Bailey also wrote the 2012 film Ethel, which "chronicles the life of Ethel Skakel Kennedy." Ethel was nominated for five Primetime Emmys, including one for Bailey (outstanding writing for nonfiction programming). Bailey was also awarded the Humanitas Prize for his work on the film.

With Keven McAlester, Bailey cowrote Last Days in Vietnam (2014), which "reconstructs . . . the tragic final days of the American presence in Vietnam." The film was nominated for an Academy Award. For his work on the film, Bailey was nominated for a Writers Guild Award and a Primetime Emmy Award.

Downfall: The Case Against Boeing, produced and cowritten by Bailey, premiered at the Sundance Film Festival on January 21, 2022, “before making its Netflix debut on February 18.” The film occupied “eighth place on Netflix’s list of most popular films worldwide, fiction or nonfiction,” and Bailey and his cowriter, Keven McAlester, were nominated for a 2023 Writers Guild Award in the category of best documentary screenplay for their work. A sequel Freefall: A Reckoning for Boeing also produced by Bailey, had its world premiere at DC/DOX in June 2026, prior to being released on Netflix on August 19, 2026.

That same year, Bailey produced and cowrote, along with Dallas Brennan Rexer, The Volcano: Rescue from Whakaari, a documentary feature about the “eruption of Whakaari on White Island off the coast of North Island in New Zealand on December 9, 2019,” which resulted in the death of twenty-two people. The film was released by Netflix on December 16, 2022, and five days later, it was ranked “the number one film in the U.S.” as well as in the UK, Australia, New Zealand, and “much of Europe.” The same week, it was ranked among the official Netflix Global Top 10.

In 2019, it was announced that Bailey would produce and write the film Adrift, which compares the story of the 1939 voyage of the German ocean liner St. Louis to the plight of international refugees today. The film, which in February 2023 was described as “nearing completion,” is produced through a partnership between Moxie Films and AR Content, founded by the Ukrainian film producer Alexander Rodnyansky.

In 2024, Bailey produced and co-wrote The Synanon Fix, a documentary series for HBO Documentary Films revolving around Synanon. In 2025, Bailey produced The Trial of Alec Baldwin revolving around Alec Baldwin and the Rust shooting incident.

== Books and works in print ==
Bailey is the author of three books that were illustrated by Edward Hemingway, a grandson of Ernest Hemingway. Of All the Gin Joints: Stumbling Through Hollywood History (2014) is a "collection of 70 anecdotes about renowned Hollywooders with 40 cocktail recipes to accompany" the stories. Hemingway & Bailey's Bartending Guide to Great American Writers (2006) "brings together classic cocktail recipes, literary history, and . . . anecdotes about famous American literati." Tiny Pie (2013), which Bailey coauthored with Michael Oatman, is a picture book for children ages three to six to which Alice Waters contributed a recipe. In addition to his collaborations with Hemingway, Bailey conducted interviews that appeared in the 1999 book American Hollow, based on the documentary of the same name.

Bailey is also the editor of the compilation Nine Irish Lives: The Thinkers, Fighters & Artists Who Helped Build America, in which nine contemporary Irish Americans, including Rosie O’Donnell, Michael Moore, and Tom Hayden (in his final written work), present the stories of nine Irish immigrants who through their lives and work had a hand in shaping the United States. In addition, he served as editor of photography book The Tibetans: A Struggle to Survive (Umbrage Editions, 1998), by Steve Lehman. He is also the creator of Courts Illustrated: Surf, Sand, and Supreme Court Justices, a satirical 2017 wall calendar.

== Other works ==
In 2016, Bailey debuted a line of plush toys called Tiny Headed Kingdom with the tagline "Tiny Heads. Big Hearts." The initial offerings were a lion, a tiger, and a bear. The line has since grown to include five other plush animals as well as hats, T-shirts, stickers, and other items.

Bailey was selected as a distinguished masterclass instructor for Film Training Manitoba (FTM) in Winnipeg, Manitoba, Canada. Following the success of an initial series of sold-out training sessions, Bailey was commissioned, alongside filmmaker Rory Kennedy, to conduct additional masterclass training sessions in the sub-Arctic community of Churchill, Manitoba. The training initiative was designed to provide advanced professional development opportunities for Manitoba's film and television workforce, with a particular focus on documentary and factual content production. Merit Jensen-Carr, Chairperson of DOC Manitoba and President and Executive Producer of Merit Motion Pictures, praised Bailey's appointment, stating: “The selection of Mark Bailey to conduct this masterclass is an exceptional offering to aid Manitoba’s film industry workforce in upscaling critical knowledge areas. There is no doubt this outstanding training program will support and grow the capacities of Manitoba’s documentary, factual and other content creators.”

== Marriage and family ==
On August 2, 1999, Bailey married Rory Kennedy, the eleventh and youngest child of former United States senator and attorney general Robert F. Kennedy, at the mansion of shipping tycoon Vardis Vardinoyiannis. Kennedy met Bailey in Washington through mutual friends after graduating from Brown University. The wedding was originally scheduled for July 17 in Hyannis Port, Massachusetts, but was postponed after the plane piloted by Rory's cousin John F. Kennedy Jr. and passengers Carolyn Bessette-Kennedy (his wife) and her sister, Lauren Bessette crashed en route to the event. The tent erected for the wedding instead became a site for family prayers during the search for Rory's family members.

Together they have three children: Georgia Elizabeth Kennedy-Bailey, born September 30, 2002; Bridget Katherine Kennedy-Bailey, born July 4, 2004; and Zachary Corkland Kennedy-Bailey, born July 16, 2007. In 2013, the family moved from Brooklyn, New York, to Los Angeles, California.

== Works ==
=== Filmography ===
Year	Title	Production Co.	Distributor	Genre	Contribution	Reference
1999	American Hollow	Moxie Films	HBO	Documentary feature	Writer	
1999	Epidemic Africa	Moxie Firecracker Films	Children Affected by AIDS Fndn.	Documentary short	Writer	
2003	Pandemic	Moxie Firecracker Films	HBO	Documentary series	Writer	
2003	A Boy's Life	Moxie Firecracker Films	HBO	Documentary feature	Writer	
2005	Torte Bluma	DMC Films, How Town	n/a	Drama short	Producer	
2007	Ghosts of Abu Ghraib	HBO, Moxie Firecracker Films	HBO	Documentary feature	Cowriter	
2008	Thank You, Mr. President	Moxie Firecracker Films	HBO	Documentary short	Writer	
2010	The Fence	Moxie Firecracker Films	HBO	Documentary short	Writer	
2012	Ethel	Moxie Firecracker Films	HBO	Documentary feature	Writer	
2014	Last Days in Vietnam	Moxie Firecracker Films	American Experience/PBS	Documentary feature	Cowriter	
2014	Women in Hollywood	Kunhardt McGee Prodns.	PBS	Documentary series episode (Makers)	Consulting producer	
2014	Women in Politics	Kunhardt McGee Prodns.	PBS	Documentary series episode (Makers)	Consulting producer	
2017	Take Every Wave	Moxie Firecracker Films	n/a	Documentary feature	Cowriter and producer	
2018	Above and Beyond	Moxie Films	Discovery Channel	Documentary feature	Cowriter and producer	
2022	The Volcano	Moxie Films	Netflix	Documentary feature	Cowriter and producer	
2022	Downfall	Imagine Documentaries	Netflix	Documentary feature	Cowriter and producer	
2024	The Synanon Fix	Moxie Films	HBO Documentary Films	Documentary series	Cowriter and producer	
2025	The Trial of Alec Baldwin	Moxie Films; Radiant Media Studios; Indus Valley Media	—N/a	Documentary feature	Producer	
2026	Freefall: A Reckoning for Boeing	Moxie Films; Imagine Documentaries	Netflix	Documentary feature	Producer	

=== Awards and nominations ===
Year	Title	Award	Category	Result	Reference
2004	Pandemic	Primetime Emmy	Outstanding Writing for Nonfiction Programming	Nominated	
2013	Ethel	Primetime Emmy	Outstanding Writing for Nonfiction Programming	Nominated	
2013	Ethel	Humanitas Prize	Documentaries—Special Awards	Won	
2015	Last Days in Vietnam	Academy Award	Best Documentary, Feature	Nominated	
2015	Last Days in Vietnam	Online Film and Television Association	Best Writing of a Nonfiction Program	Won	
2015	Last Days in Vietnam	Writers Guild of America	Best Documentary Screenplay	Nominated	
2015	Last Days in Vietnam	Primetime Emmy	Outstanding Writing for Nonfiction Programming	Nominated	
2015	Makers	News and Documentary Emmy	Outstanding Historical Programming, Long Form	Nominated	
2018	Downfall	Writers Guild of America	Best Documentary Screenplay	Nominated	
