= Steve Lehman =

Steve Lehman may refer to:

- Steve Lehman (composer) (born 1978), jazz composer and saxophonist
- Steve Lehman (photographer), American-born photographer
