= American Hollow =

- Directed by: Rory Kennedy
- Written by: Mark Bailey; Samantha Bowling
- Produced by: Rory Kennedy
- Starring: Bascum Bowling; Clint Bowling; Edgar Bowling; Iree Bowling; Samantha Bowling
- Cinematography: Nick Doob
- Edited by: Adam Zucker
- Music by: Bill Frisell
- Distributed by: HBO
- Release date: 26 May 1999
- Running time: 90 min.
- Country: United States
- Language: English

American Hollow is a 1999 American documentary film directed and produced by Rory Kennedy. The film follows the extended Bowling family, residents of an eastern Kentucky valley, for a year in Perry County, Kentucky. The music for the film was composed by Bill Frisell. An accompanying novel, also titled American Hollow was also released alongside the film in 1999. It was authored by Rory Kennedy.

== Summary ==
American Hollow follows the Bowling family of Mudlick Hollow, an Appalachian valley in Perry County. The family is headed by Iree and Bass Bowling, whose thirteen children largely remain in the valley they grew up in, though one, George, left for Cincinnati. Over the course of a year, the documentary shows the stories of the family, including daughter Samantha, divorcing her abusive husband who is later convicted of murder; 19-year-old Clint, a grandson whose 17-year-old fiancée twice calls off their engagement; and son Edgar, who is held in the county jail for over two weeks after being misidentified as a suspect of trespassing.

In the conclusion of this movie in 1999, it is noted that:

"Samantha Canada is now working at Mid-South Electronics and is supporting her children."

"Her ex-husband, Jody Canada, was convicted of murder and is serving a life sentence."

"Clint Bowling returned to the hollow one month after his departure."

"Shirley Couch dropped out of high school but plans to get her GED."

"Clint and Shirley remain apart"

== Cast ==
- Iree Bowling
- Bascum "Bass" Bowling
- Clint Bowling
- Alonzo Bowling
- Polly Bowling
- Edgar Bowling
- Edith Bowling
- Patrick "Pat" Bowling
- Samantha Bowling
- Wanda Bowling
