= Children of Crisis =

American child social study by Robert Coles

Children of Crisis is a social study of children in the United States written by child psychiatrist Robert Coles and published in five volumes by Little, Brown and Company between 1967 and 1977. Some of the accounts covered African-American children of the American South during desegregation, including Ruby Bridges. In 2003, the publisher released a one-volume compilation of selections from the series with a new introduction by the author. Volumes 2 and 3 shared (with Frances FitzGerald's Fire in the Lake: The Vietnamese and the Americans in Vietnam) the 1973 Pulitzer Prize for General Nonfiction.

== Volumes ==
- Volume 1: A Study of Courage and Fear (1967)
- Volume 2: Migrants, Sharecroppers, Mountaineers (1971)
- Volume 3: The South Goes North (1971)
- Volume 4: Eskimos, Chicanos, Indians (1977) ISBN 0-316-15162-9
- Volume 5: Privileged Ones: The Well-Off and the Rich in America (1977) ISBN 0-316-15149-1
