= USA 94: Brazil's Return to Glory =

2026 sports documentary film

- Portuguese: Tetra: Acreditar de Novo
- Literally: Tetra: Believing Again
- Directed by: Luis Ara
- Based on: Brazil's victory in the 1994 FIFA World Cup
- Produced by: Netflix
- Production company: Netflix
- Distributed by: Netflix
- Release date: June 7, 2026
- Running time: 86 minutes
- Country: Brazil
- Languages: Portuguese; Italian; English; French

USA 94: Brazil's Return to Glory (Portuguese: Tetra: Acreditar de Novo, lit. 'Tetra: Believing Again') is a documentary film released on June 7, 2026, produced by the streaming platform Netflix and directed by the Uruguayan-American filmmaker Luis Ara. The miniseries follows the Brazilian national team's journey at the 1994 FIFA World Cup.

== Background ==
In 1994, the Brazilian national soccer team began the FIFA World Cup tournament, held in the United States, after a twenty-four-year title drought, the longest such drought in the national team's history up to that point. In the opening moments of the documentary, goalkeeper Gilmar says, "I have eight hours of footage. Imagine how much material there is. Here, the whole story is told in detail. Those were different times, right? There's not even enough of this to air anymore, but there's a lot here. I started recording, and we built up a wonderful archive of everything that happened. I had an idea: what if we showed what no one had ever seen from the inside, the intimacy, the locker room, their mindset, the good and bad moments, everything." Another player who recorded moments from training camps, trips, and behind-the-scenes footage of the World Cup was Jorginho.

The Uruguayan-American filmmaker Luis Ara was responsible for directing, conducting interviews, and editing the archival footage. He had previously directed the original Netflix film, Brazil 2002: The Real Story, in which he performed a similar task using footage shot by the player Juliano Belletti. In an interview with journalist Angelo Cordeiro of Rolling Stone Brasil magazine, he praised the collective spirit of the 1994 national team: "The team was what won that World Cup. We tried to ensure a balanced perspective and representation of all the characters, rather than focusing on just one."

== Cast ==
- Romário
- Bebeto
- Dunga
- Zinho
- Raí
- Ricardo Rocha
- Gilmar Rinaldi
- Carlos Alberto Parreira
- Gianluca Pagliuca
- Demetrio Albertini

== Release ==
The miniseries premiered on June 7, 2026, on Netflix. The premiere was postponed by one month from the original date.

== Reception ==
Marcos Santuario, writing for the Rio Grande do Sul newspaper Correio do Povo, praised the film for "delving into the 1994 victory through previously unseen footage recorded by the players themselves." Fernanda Kalaoun, writing for Bula magazine, gave it four out of five stars and added that "With interviews with several players from that era, behind-the-scenes home videos, and media footage from that period, the documentary captures the true Brazilian sentiment toward the team: disbelief."

Ricky Hiraoka, in his column for Universo Online, compared the series to the miniseries Brazil 70: The Third Star and said that "meticulously crafted and well-developed, both productions seem to have been designed down to the last detail to resonate with soccer fans."
