= The Trial of Alec Baldwin =

2025 American documentary film

- Directed by: Rory Kennedy
- Produced by: Rory Kennedy; Mark Bailey; Julia Marchesi
- Cinematography: Jenna Rosher
- Edited by: Jawad Metni
- Music by: Gary Lionelli
- Production companies: Moxie Films; Cross Creek Pictures; Indus Valley Media; Radiant Media Studios; Zoltana Films
- Distributed by: Abramorama
- Release dates: November 13, 2025 (Doc NYC); October 1, 2026 (United States)
- Running time: 111 minutes
- Country: United States
- Language: English

The Trial of Alec Baldwin is a 2025 American documentary film directed and produced by Rory Kennedy. It explores Alec Baldwin in the aftermath of the Rust shooting incident, following his life and trial.

It had its world premiere at Doc NYC on November 13, 2025, was released on October 1, 2026, by Abramorama.

== Premise ==
Explores the life and trial of Alec Baldwin in the aftermath of the Rust shooting incident.

== Production ==
In April 2023, Rory Kennedy was announced to be in production of a documentary revolving around Alec Baldwin and the Rust shooting incident. Kennedy began filming Baldwin in 2023, who agreed to provide "full access" to his life throughout the trial after being initially hesitant

In May 2024, Kennedy was revealed to be fighting a subpoena by prosecutors to turn over footage in the documentary, claiming it included "critical pieces of information concerning key elements of this criminal prosecution." In an affidavit, Kennedy stated Baldwin did not approach or commission the documentary and had no creative or editorial control over the film. A judge later ruled Kennedy did not have to turn over footage. Kennedy was denied access to the resuming production of Rust after production felt Baldwin was making the project to "exonerate" himself, with director Joel Souza declining to sit for an interview. Executive produced by Ray Maiello, Rob Guillermo, Colin Marshal, Todd Thompson, Rita Powers, Tanner Cusumano and Jared Underwood.

== Release ==
It had its world premiere at DOC NYC on November 13, 2025. In September 2026, Abramorama acquired distribution rights to the film, and set it for a October 1, 2026, release. On September 2, 2026, The Hollywood Reporter featured the film in its 2027 Oscar forecast, calling it a "major threat." On September 10, 2026 the first trailer was released.
