= The Synanon Fix =

2024 American TV documentary series

- Written by: Jeff Swimmer; Mark Bailey; Keven McAlester
- Directed by: Rory Kennedy
- Music by: Nathan Larson
- Country of origin: United States
- Original language: English
- No. of episodes: 4

Production
- Executive producers: Rory Kennedy; Mark Bailey; Nancy Abraham; Lisa Heller; Tina Nguyen
- Producers: Alexandra Korba; Keven McAlester
- Cinematography: Lincoln Else
- Editors: Gillian McCarthy; Veronica Pinkham
- Running time: 60 minutes
- Production companies: HBO Documentary Films; Moxie Films

Original release
- Network: HBO
- Release: April 1 – April 22, 2024

The Synanon Fix is an American documentary series directed and produced by Rory Kennedy. It explores the rise and fall of Synanon, told through the eyes of former members, into its descent into a cult.

It had its world premiere at the 2024 Sundance Film Festival on January 21, 2024. It premiered on April 1, 2024, on HBO.

== Premise ==
Explores the rise and fall of Synanon, told through the eyes of former members, into its descent into a cult.

== Episodes ==
No.	Title	Directed by	Original release date
1	"Here Come the Dopefiends"	Rory Kennedy	April 1, 2024
2	"A War on Convention"	Rory Kennedy	April 8, 2024
3	"What in The Hell is Happening?"	Rory Kennedy	April 15, 2024
4	"Strap Yourself to the Mast"	Rory Kennedy	April 22, 2024

== Production ==
Rory Kennedy and Mark Bailey wanted to make a documentary revolving around Synanon, after looking at communities and charismatic leaders, wondering how people come to these places, and the relevancy of the story in modern day with the false sense of community. The two came across Synanon through the book Straight Life: The Story of Art Pepper by Art Pepper.

Initially, the Synanon archive declined the filmmakers access; after discussing their intentions with Dederich's daughter, they were granted access three weeks prior to the series being pictured locked. HBO allowed the filmmakers to go through the archive, which included 35,000 photos and 3,000 hours of archive video footage.

In August 2022, it was announced Rory Kennedy would direct a documentary revolving around Synanon for HBO Documentary Films.

== Reception ==
Eve Batey of Reality Blurred praised the series approach and lack of misdirection and dead-end tropes, writing: "She somehow manages, through intelligently paced interviews with former members and archival footage, to place us in the same shoes as people who were in the cult, slowly turning up the heat until we realize we started to accept the unacceptable."

Brian Tallerico of RogerEbert.com gave the series a 2.5 out of 4, praising Kennedy's interviewing skills, criticizing the pacing and length of the series, writing: "The Synanon Fix” isn’t the right length—it would have made an excellent feature documentary as the first couple episodes take too long to get to the downfall era of Synanon, but there’s something powerful about the sheer bulk of the hard-to-believe stories of a group that felt problematic from the beginning."
