= John Barnett (whistleblower) =

American whistleblower (1962–2024)

- Born: John Mitchell Barnett; February 23, 1962; Mount Shasta, California, United States
- Died: March 9, 2024 (aged 62); Charleston, South Carolina, U.S.
- Cause of death: Suicide by firearm
- Education: Seattle University
- Employer: Boeing (c. 1985 – 2017)
- Known for: Boeing whistleblower
- Spouse(s): Cindy Swafford (div.); Diane Johnson

John Mitchell Barnett (February 23, 1962 – March 9, 2024) was an American whistleblower who was known for his substantiated safety and quality reports to the Federal Aviation Administration (FAA) about Boeing's production of the Boeing 787 Dreamliner. Barnett worked in quality control at Boeing for 32 years, serving for seven as a manager at Boeing South Carolina. Barnett was one of several employees to go public with The New York Times about malpractices beginning in 2019 at Boeing, and was featured in the 2022 Netflix documentary titled Downfall: The Case Against Boeing.

During his time in South Carolina, Barnett documented and reported several safety and quality issues to Boeing and the FAA. Boeing's own internal investigations corroborated his complaints about malfunctioning emergency oxygen systems and, in 2017, the FAA ordered remedial actions in regards to his complaints about non-conforming parts and metal shavings. Barnett subsequently filed a whistleblower complaint with Occupational Safety and Health Administration (OSHA) under the FAA's Whistleblower Protection Program, AIR 21, which was closed by OSHA in favor of Boeing after a four-year investigation in 2021.

In 2021, Barnett and his attorneys appealed the decision and amended the original complaint, alleging that the company "undermined his career because he had raised safety concerns," which Boeing denied. As of March 12, 2024, his whistleblower case against Boeing was pending, to be continued under his estate.

In March 2024, after he failed to report for his third day of deposition, he was found dead of a gunshot wound. The Charleston County coroner described the wound as self-inflicted. A conspiracy theory that Boeing had assassinated him spread amongst the public. Video surveillance and other evidence examined by the Charleston Police Department showed that Barnett's cause of death was suicide by firearm, caused by "a period of serious personal distress" related to his participation in the whistleblower case.

== Early life and career ==
Barnett was born February 23, 1962, in Mount Shasta, California. He was known by nicknames Swamp Doggy, Swampy, and Mitch. He grew up in the Crossroads region of Louisiana and had three older brothers. His father was a rail worker. After his parents separated, Barnett and his brothers moved with his mother to her hometown of Alexandria, Louisiana.

After graduating from Bolton High School, and working as a cab driver for a period of time, Barnett enlisted in the United States Air Force (USAF). After completing basic training camp, there weren't any available training slots for new recruits. Barnett instead took a job in Palmdale, California at Rockwell International manufacturing parts for the Space Shuttle program, including the Space Shuttle Atlantis, which were operated by NASA. In the 1980s, Barnett worked as an electrician on the Rockwell B-1 Lancer, which as of 2024 is still operated by the USAF.

In 1988, he moved to Camano Island, where he lived for 25 years. He joined Boeing as a quality inspector, where he met both of his wives, Cindy Swafford, and later in life long after his divorce, Diane Johnson, who worked as an FAA liaison at Boeing for 28 years. Barnett remained a step-father to his first wife's two sons. Johnson died of brain cancer in late 2022. While living in the Seattle area, Barnett raced stock cars at Evergreen Speedway.

While at Boeing, Barnett attended night classes at Seattle University, but said his "12-hours a day, seven days a week" work schedule led him to decide to drop out before graduating.

== Boeing and whistleblowing ==
Barnett worked his way into a lead position while at the Boeing Everett Factory, which produces the 747, 767, and 777 planes, where he said he was impressed with Boeing's "attention to quality and safety." While there, he developed an 11-course curriculum for training other auditors.

From 2010 to 2017, he worked as a quality control manager for Boeing South Carolina plant, which produces the 787. Barnett blamed a culture shift between the Everett and South Carolina plants on the latter's management being from the military, where he said he was pressured not to document defects and to follow non-Boeing procedures. He characterized the defense-based management's motto as "we’re in Charleston and we can do anything we want" and their wishes to, "...push planes out the door and make the cash register ring." He later said of the factory and its management, "...the whole place smelled of French fries," referring to the practice of hiring mechanics whose previous experience was in fast food.

Barnett said he was demoted and removed from management in 2013, for which he filed an ethics complaint. He was reassigned by the same manager that demoted him to another department in 2015. In 2017, Barnett filed an FAA AIR 21 whistleblower complaint against Boeing with OSHA.

=== Documentation and process procedures ===
In 2013, a senior manager downgraded Barnett's employment level for "using email to express process violations" in place of face-to-face communication, which Barnett "took to mean he shouldn't put problems in writing." The manager also pushed Barnett to get better at "working in the gray areas and help find a way while maintaining compliance." Barnett said that management was pressuring and encouraging workers not to document defects, resulting in inaccurate build records, a violation of FAA regulations. He also said that Boeing was implementing a program that allowed mechanics to inspect and verify their own work, eliminating quality inspection employees altogether. During an inspection of a Spirit AeroSystems section with four quality inspectors, Barnett documented 300 defects for which he was told they had found "too many defects." On a follow-up trip, Barnett was excluded and only two inspectors were given a truncated timeline that only allowed them time to document 50 defects, a reduction for which they were given accolades.

Barnett attributed the pressure from management to overcome production delays with the 787, stating that documenting defects slows down the assembly line. In April 2024, another quality manager in Everett, Washington, Merle Meyers, who had been at Boeing for 30 years told the New York Times that the airline manufacturer re-prioritized schedule over quality. Also in April 2024, quality engineer Sam Salehpour reported similar issues after a 2021 delay of the 787 due to unacceptable fuselage gaps. Salehpour claimed that to address the flaws the company took "shortcuts" that forced the gaps closed, instead of engineering new parts. Salehpour has also filed a whistleblower complaint with the FAA against Boeing. A former Boeing mechanic, Davin Fischer, reported similar issues working on the 737. Boeing's chief financial officer, Brian West, stated at a March 2024 investor conference, "For years, we prioritized the movement of the airplane through the factory over getting it done right. And that's got to change."

=== Use of defective parts and emergency oxygen equipment failure ===
Barnett claimed that, in 2016, a senior manager installed a scrapped, dented hydraulic tube in a plane. He filed a complaint with human resources. Boeing stated that they had investigated and did not substantiate those claims.

He raised issues of more missing defective parts to management, fearing that they had been installed. He claimed his bosses directed him to finish paperwork on missing parts without determining where they had ended up. No action was taken by managers.

Barnett claimed workers did not follow procedures to track components, allowing the loss of parts and later installation of defective parts. He stated that these installations were to prevent delays on the production line, as was the lack of following procedure.

In 2017, Barnett's team found that 25% of the oxygen systems for the 787 would fail to send oxygen through the cylinders to passengers in the case of an emergency. Barnett said that his report to management was stonewalled, so he alerted the FAA. Boeing's internal investigation found malfunctioning oxygen masks.

A 2017 FAA report determined that at least 53 "non-conforming" parts were missing, and ordered Boeing to take remedial action.

=== Debris ===
Barnett said that he was getting complaints about debris and various items being left inside of their planes, including tools, drawings, and fasteners. On a test flight of a 787, a ladder was found inside a horizontal stabilizer. Barnett said if it had not been found, the ladder could have fallen and caused the plane to malfunction.

=== Metal shavings ===
Barnett reported that he had discovered "clusters of metal shavings", due to the process of securing titanium e-nuts, left near electrical systems for flight controls, which could have "catastrophic" results if the shavings were able to penetrate the wiring. He stated that he repeatedly urged his bosses to take action, but they instead transferred him to another part of the plant. In 2017, the FAA issued a directive mandating removal of shavings pre-delivery. Boeing claimed they were complying and working to improve the design to avoid the issue, but determined that the issue was not a flight safety issue.

=== Retaliation ===
Barnett alleged that he was denied a promotion he said he was the most qualified applicant for, demoted, transferred out of his position in quality inspection into an undesirable department, and blocked from a job at Michoud Assembly Facility, a NASA center in New Orleans that manufactures rocket parts.

== Retirement ==
According to Barnett's family, Barnett's doctor stated that the job-related stress would cause Barnett a heart attack unless he quit. He retired in 2017.

In 2019, he came forward to discuss numerous malpractices of Boeing with British broadcaster BBC, including overworking employees and not providing proper maintenance to aircraft. In 2019, Barnett appeared in a New York Times article raising additional quality issues at his former facility, speaking about the metal shavings. Boeing subsequently denied his allegations. However, a 2017 review by the FAA had upheld several of Barnett's concerns: it was discovered that over 50 "non-conforming" plane components in the facility were considered missing as their location could not be found.

In 2021, after a four-years-long investigation, OSHA closed the whistleblower complaint in favor of Boeing. Barnett and his lawyers appealed the decision and amended the lawsuit, claiming the firm had "undermined his career because he had raised safety concerns at the Charleston plant". His attorney, Robert Turkewitz, criticized the effectiveness of whistleblower court systems because they do not have the power to subpoena documents from defendants. In December 2021, the United States Senate Committee on Commerce, Science, and Transportation released a whistleblower report determining that the FAA failed to administer adequate oversight to address concerns from Boeing and FAA whistleblowers. Boeing had settled a criminal charge with the United States Department of Justice in September that year for conspiracy to defraud the government regarding fatal design flaws in the Maneuvering Characteristics Augmentation System of the 737 Max.

Barnett was featured in the 2022 Netflix documentary Downfall: The Case Against Boeing. A sequel focusing on his death Freefall: A Reckoning for Boeing has been released in August 2026.

In early 2024, Barnett issued further warnings regarding Boeing's work culture and vehicle safety following Alaska Airlines Flight 1282, in which a door was blown out.

== Death ==
Barnett was in Charleston, South Carolina, the week of March 12, 2024, for his deposition stemming from his 2017 whistleblower complaint against Boeing. Before his death, he had given a deposition and had been undergoing direct examination by his own legal team and cross-examination by Boeing's. According to a March 2024 interview with his lawyer, Brian Knowles, Barnett was supposed to report for the third day of his deposition, for further questioning, but did not show up or respond to calls on the next day.

At 9:42am on March 9, a hotel staff member heard a gunshot. At 10am, Barnett's attorney called the hotel asking for a wellness check. He was found dead shortly afterward in the hotel parking lot in his truck, with a single gunshot wound to the head. He had his legally owned pistol in his hand, with his finger still on the trigger, and left a suicide note in the passenger seat, on which he wrote, "I can't do this any longer" and "I pray Boeing pays." Video surveillance showed Barnett left the hotel on the evening of March 8, but returned a few minutes later and re-parked, remaining inside his vehicle. No activity was observed of Barnett or his vehicle until the following morning, on March 9, when at 7:20am the vehicle lights blinked on and off. His vehicle was found to be locked and the key fob was in Barnett's pocket.

On March 11, the Charleston County coroner's office characterized his death as self-inflicted. After requests from the family and Barnett's attorneys, the Charleston Police Department investigated the circumstances that led to his death. They found Barnett to be going through "a period of serious personal distress," and on May 17, they concluded that Barnett's death was a suicide related to chronic stress, anxiety, and post-traumatic stress disorder (PTSD) caused by the whistleblower case. During the investigation, the police obtained his cell phone and medical records which showed participation in the ongoing legal battle with Boeing "exacerbated" "numerous mental health issues related to the whistleblower case" he was suffering from. Fingerprint analysis found only Barnett's and a ballistics report confirmed the trajectory of the bullet was consistent as originating from Barnett's hand.

At the time of his death, he lived in Pineville, Louisiana, where he had moved to take care of his mother.

As of March 12, the lawsuit against Boeing was pending continuation under Barnett's estate. His attorneys stated that the case would still go to trial in June.

=== Conspiracy theories ===
A conspiracy theory alleging that Boeing had assassinated Barnett spread widely after a woman who identified herself as a friend of Barnett's said that Barnett told her, "If anything happens to me, it's not suicide." She said that "they made [his death] look like a suicide." Boeing released a statement saying "We are saddened by Mr. Barnett's death, and our thoughts are with his friends and family." Knowles and Turkewitz told CBS News that "Barnett was in very good spirits and really looking forward to putting this phase of his life behind him and moving on. We didn't see any indication he would take his own life. No one can believe it." Turkewitz called for a police investigation into his death, but later told Fox News that he did not believe Boeing had orchestrated his death. Barnett's family said that "he was looking forward to having his day in court and hoped that it would force Boeing to change its culture," and that "he was suffering from PTSD and anxiety attacks as a result of being subjected to the hostile work environment at Boeing which we believe led to his death". His attorneys said in a statement after the release of the coroner's report, "Mr. Barnett’s last words make clear that while Boeing may not have pulled the trigger, the company is responsible for his death."

In May 2024, the conspiracy theory that Boeing had plotted to have whistleblowers murdered again spread on social media after another aviation whistleblower associated with Boeing also represented by Barnett's attorney, Brian Knowles, died less than two months later. Joshua Dean, a former quality inspector for the contractor Spirit AeroSystems, a 2005 Boeing spin-off, checked himself into the hospital after experiencing difficulty breathing from contracting influenza B and Methicillin-resistant Staphylococcus aureus (MRSA). He died two weeks later (May 1, 2024) after developing pneumonia and suffering a stroke. Dean and other workers at the Wichita, Kansas factory testified that they had been instructed to downplay or hide production defects on the 737 Max, which had a door plug blow off mid-flight in January 2024.

The deaths of Barnett and Dean prompted more than 10 new whistleblowers from Boeing and Spirit to come forward with similar allegations. Santiago Paredes, another Spirit whistleblower, dismissed the conspiracy theories.

== See also ==
- Boeing manufacturing issues
- Gary Webb
- Dan Applegate
