= Queen of Chess =

2026 film by Rory Kennedy

- Directed by: Rory Kennedy
- Written by: Mark Bailey; Keven McAlester
- Produced by: Mark Bailey; Keven McAlester
- Cinematography: Imre Juhász
- Edited by: Azin Samari; Jesse Overman
- Music by: Camilo Forero; Chris Brocato
- Distributed by: Netflix
- Release date: February 6, 2026
- Running time: 93 minutes
- Country: United States
- Languages: English; Hungarian

Queen of Chess is a 2026 American documentary film which explores the life and career of Hungarian chess grandmaster Judit Polgár. It was directed by Rory Kennedy.

== Synopsis ==
It focuses on her father's efforts to train her and her two sisters to become chess grandmasters, and on the saga of her multiple and intense matches against the then formidable world champion Garry Kasparov.

== Release ==
The film had its world premiere at the 2026 Sundance Film Festival.

== Reception ==
On the review aggregator website Rotten Tomatoes, 88% of 16 critics' reviews are positive. Metacritic, which uses a weighted average, assigned the film a score of 75 out of 100, based on five critics, indicating "generally favorable" reviews.
