= Downfall: The Case Against Boeing =

2022 American documentary film

- Promotional poster
- Directed by: Rory Kennedy
- Written by: Mark Bailey; Keven McAlester
- Based on: Crashes of two Boeing 737 MAX planes
- Produced by: Mark Bailey; Sara Bernstein; Brian Grazer; Rory Kennedy; Keven McAlester; Amanda Rohlke; Justin Wilkes
- Cinematography: Aaron Gully
- Edited by: Don Kleszy
- Music by: Gary Lionelli
- Production companies: Imagine Documentaries; Moxie Films
- Distributed by: Netflix
- Release date: February 18, 2022
- Running time: 89 minutes
- Country: United States
- Language: English

Downfall: The Case Against Boeing is a 2022 American documentary film directed by Rory Kennedy. Interviewing relevant people and featuring archival footage, the documentary looks into the events throughout the history of the aircraft manufacturer company Boeing that led to the crashes of two 737 MAX planes occurring within a short time span, as well as its subsequent investigation. The film sides with interviewees in criticizing the capitalization of Boeing, noting that the urge to beat major competitor Airbus led to the neglect of component failures within the 737 MAX.

Downfall premiered in a virtual screening at the 2022 Sundance Film Festival on January 21, 2022, before being released on Netflix on February 18 as a Netflix Original Documentary. The film received wide critical acclaim for its comprehensiveness, narrative structure, and emotions, mostly aimed towards Kennedy and editor Don Kleszy. The documentary renewed public attention on the 737 MAX 8 case, causing further criticism of Boeing, who had initially declined to participate in filming and rebuked the film after its release.

== Summary ==
The documentary examines the crashes of two Boeing 737 MAX planes which claimed the lives of 346 people on board and how Boeing may have been more concerned with financial gain over the safety of their passengers.

Kennedy said about the 21st-century history of Boeing:

There were many decades when Boeing did extraordinary things by focusing on excellence and safety and ingenuity. Those three virtues were seen as the key to profit. It could work, and beautifully. And then they were taken over by a group that decided Wall Street was the end-all, be-all. There needs to be a balance in play, so you have to elect representatives that hold the companies responsible for the public interest, rather than just lining their own pocketbooks.

== Release and reception ==
The film was released on February 18, 2022, and has an 91% approval rating based on 34 reviews on the review aggregator site Rotten Tomatoes, with an average rating of 7.5/10. The site's critical consensus reads: "With impressive clarity, Downfall: The Case Against Boeing reveals corporate corruption that's enraging in its callousness and frightening in its scope."

Downfall: The Case Against Boeing was viewed globally for 7.42 million hours on Netflix between February 13, 2022 and February 20, 2022.

== Sequel ==
A sequel Freefall: A Reckoning for Boeing focusing on the death of whistleblower John Barnett and other whistleblowers coming forward had its world premiere at DC/DOX Film Festival in June 2026, prior to being released on August 19, 2026, on Netflix.
