= Last Days in Vietnam =

2014 film by Rory Kennedy

- Film poster
- Directed by: Rory Kennedy
- Written by: Keven McAlester; Mark Bailey
- Produced by: Rory Kennedy; Keven McAlester
- Cinematography: Joan Churchill
- Edited by: Don Kleszy
- Music by: Gary Lionelli
- Production company: Moxie Firecracker Films
- Distributed by: American Experience Films; PBS Distribution
- Release dates: January 17, 2014 (Sundance Film Festival); September 5, 2014 (United States)
- Running time: 98 minutes
- Country: United States
- Languages: English; French; German (Arte)
- Budget: Unknown
- Box office: $161,300

Last Days in Vietnam is a 2014 American documentary film written, produced and directed by Rory Kennedy. The film had its world premiere at 2014 Sundance Film Festival on January 17, 2014.

After its premiere at Sundance Film Festival, American Experience Films acquired the distribution rights of the film, in association with PBS Distribution for DVD releases. The film had a theatrical release in New York City on September 5, 2014, before expanding nationwide in the United States during September and early October. The film was nominated for the Academy Award for Best Documentary Feature at the 87th Academy Awards. It also garnered a nomination for Best Documentary Screenplay from the Writers Guild of America. It premiered on PBS television on April 28, 2015.

== Synopsis ==
During the chaotic final weeks of the Vietnam War, the North Vietnamese Army closes in on Saigon as the panicked South Vietnamese people desperately attempt to escape. On the ground, American soldiers and diplomats confront the same moral quandary: whether to obey White House orders to evacuate American citizens only—or to risk punishment and save the lives of as many South Vietnamese citizens as they can. The events recounted in the film mainly center on the American evacuation of Saigon codenamed Operation Frequent Wind.

Interviewees included Henry Kissinger, Richard Armitage, Frank Snepp, Stuart Herrington, and Terry McNamara among numerous others.

== Reception ==
Last Days in Vietnam received positive reviews from critics. Last Days in Vietnam has an approval rating of 95% on review aggregator website Rotten Tomatoes, based on 62 reviews, and an average rating of 8.40/10. The website's critical consensus states, "As gripping as it is inspiring, Last Days in Vietnam offers a surprisingly fresh -- and heart-wrenching -- perspective on the end of the Vietnam War". It also has a score of 86 out of 100 on Metacritic, based on 33 critics, indicating "universal acclaim".

Rob Nelson of Variety, said in his review, "Rory Kennedy's documentary combines astonishing footage from Saigon in April 1975 with contemporary recollections from some who were there." Justin Lowe in his review for The Hollywood Reporter praised the film by saying, "A virtually untold chapter of American history still poignantly resonates nearly four decades later." Mary Sollosi of Indiewire, grade the film B+ and said, "While the documentary hardly breaks any new creative ground, its powerful content speaks for itself by revealing a harrowing episode of the Vietnam War — already a troubling chapter of American history." Dan Schindel in his review for Non-fics said, "'Last Days in Vietnam' was an incredibly pleasant surprise. It is a prime example of how documentaries can illuminate our shared memory’s gaps, and how nonfiction can frequently outdo the best thrills Hollywood has to offer."
