= Ghosts of Abu Ghraib =

- Directed by: Rory Kennedy
- Written by: Jack Youngelson
- Produced by: Rory Kennedy; Liz Garbus; Jack Youngelson
- Cinematography: Tom Hurwitz
- Edited by: Sari Gilman
- Music by: Miriam Cutler
- Production companies: HBO Documentary Films; Moxie Firecracker Films; The Fledgling Fund
- Distributed by: HBO
- Release date: 2007
- Running time: 82 minutes (Sundance Film Festival)
- Country: USA

Ghosts of Abu Ghraib is a 2007 documentary film, directed by Rory Kennedy, that examines the events of the 2004 Abu Ghraib torture and prisoner abuse scandal. The film premiered January 19, 2007, at the 2007 Sundance Film Festival.

== Content ==
This documentary was the first to feature Iraqi victims (interviewed in Turkey) as well as guards who were directly involved in the torture in the prison. In the film, director Rory Kennedy examines how "ordinary soldiers" were capable of such acts. The film presents the torture as the result of military and government policies implemented in a climate of fear and chaos, inadequate training and inadequate resources.

Using these interviews, the film traces the events that led to the scandal, beginning with the terrorist attacks on September 11, 2001. Using footage from the Milgram experiment in the 1960s at Yale, the film suggests that most people are capable of committing inhumane acts against other people when ordered to do so.

== Distribution ==
The film aired on HBO on February 22, 2007. It was also shown at the Human Rights Watch Film Festival on March 23, 2007, at the Cleveland International Film Festival on March 25, 2007 and at the Oslo International Film Festival on November 17, 2007.

Working Films coordinated the US national community engagement campaign with Ghosts of Abu Ghraib. It brought together the National Religious Campaign Against Torture, the American Civil Liberties Union, faith groups, and others to end US policy sanctioning torture.

== Critical reception ==
The film attracted some interest in media and was discussed extensively.

The film was nominated for four Emmys at the 59th Primetime Emmy Awards in the categories of Outstanding Nonfiction Special, Outstanding Directing for Nonfiction Programming, Outstanding Picture Editing for Nonfiction Programming, and Outstanding Sound Editing for Nonfiction Programming (Single or Multi-Camera). It won the award for Outstanding Nonfiction Special.
