= Steve Lehman (photographer) =

American-born conceptual artist

Steve Lehman (born 1964) is an American-born conceptual artist whose oeuvre consists of photographs, videos, collages, drawings, writings, sculpture, objects, paintings and installations. He is also the founder of WillyNilly™, a digital lifestyle company. He is most famous for his book The Tibetans: A Struggle to Survive. Lehman’s work is distinct because of his ability to “sample” other artists, weave together many types of art and merge different disciplines.

== Background ==
Lehman is born to a family of Jewish film industry pioneers and printers. His great-grandfather was an early film distributor, who sold “single reelers” in the early 1900s for Universal Films. Lehman's father’s side of the family owned Lehman Brothers, Inc., a high quality printing and engraving company. As a boy, Lehman studied art, photography, graphic design, film, and business from a young age.

== Career ==
Lehman graduated Duke University in the late 1980s and then went to Tibet to live. He was trying to find a remote village of cave dwellers hoping to work on a visual anthropological project. The day before he was to leave to find the cave dwellers, he stumbled upon a group of monks demonstrating for independence. Though he had no interest in journalism, he quickly reacted and photographed the monks. His pictures and written account broke the story of the Tibetan unrest. Years later he wrote in the introduction to The Tibetans: A Struggle Survive, “Immediately I understood the implications of their (monks) actions and knew they were either going to be shot dead in the street or imprisoned. I was moved by their selflessness, by their decision to stand up for their beliefs and give up their lives for the greater benefit of Tibetan society. It was clear that they wanted me to photograph the demonstration and I reacted. There was no hesitation — witnessing those young monks sacrificing their lives was very powerful and I felt an obligation to do what I could.” However, as time went on, the moral ambiguity and physical toll of working in journalism weighed heavily on him and he eventually stopped.

Upon his return the United States late in 1987, Lehman started giving slide shows to friends, relatives, people interested in Tibet and then began giving presentations at schools and universities. He also showed his photographs to legislators and had an exhibit on Capitol Hill sponsored by the late Congressman Tom Lantos and the Congressional Human Rights Caucus. Lantos, a survivor of the Holocaust lauded his work saying that “Lehman continues to chronicle the Tibetans’ courageous struggle for human rights and his work is a major contribution to understanding the Tibetan story.”

Lehman’s actions helped spearhead the citizen’s journalism movement because traditional news organizations were largely not present for the unrest in Tibet and wouldn't devout the necessary resources to cover Tibet because they didn't take the conflict seriously. Lehman returned to Tibet many times on his own to document the sociopolitical situation. His efforts were instrumental in the formation of the Free Tibet movement in the West. Philip Glass, the composer and prominent Tibet supporter, wrote that "Steve Lehman’s book, The Tibetans: A Struggle to Survive, is essential in helping us piece together the recent events in Tibet." Robert Thurman, author, Tibet activist, and Columbia University Tibet Scholar declared that Lehman’s book “is a must read for those who want to understand their planet.”

In response to the limited amount of reporting from Tibet, Lehman created The Tibetans, a non-profit dedicated to educating the public about Tibet in 1997. They produced a book, website, exhibition, multimedia lecture, and video. He co-published The Tibetans: A Struggle to Survive with How Town and the prominent visual book publisher Umbrage. Lehman has spoken about Tibet on CNN, The Leonard Lopate Show and other news outlets.

== The Tibetans ==
In a review of his book The Tibetans: A Struggle To Survive, for Tricycle Anne Seidlitz writes, "Steve Lehman expands the boundaries of his field. He was in the vanguard that moved photojournalism into the realm of fine art. Lehman and several of his peers “push the edges of the creative envelope” and make images that are both art and informational. He distinguished himself because his ability to create the necessary balance —he made complex political stories accessible and informative without trivializing the subject matter. Lehman also managed to steer clear of aestheticizing suffering to the point of it becoming distasteful. Though he covered a significant amount of conflict, he did not over emphasize death and destruction. A major theme in his art is how positive and negative things exist simultaneously. The Dalai Lama wrote of his work, ”...the pictures in this book, The Tibetans: A Struggle to Survive, vividly reveal how much has changed in Tibet under Chinese rule. And yet, the unbroken Tibetan spirit also shines through. Tibetans at home and in exile remain determined to preserve our identity and regain the freedom we have lost.”

Lehman also broke from his predecessors in photography by not committing to a singular photographic style. In his book The Tibetans: A Struggle to Survive, Lehman made images in at least 20 different styles of photography — he would use color, black and white film, point and shoot, single lens reflex and medium format cameras, found pictures and then weave everything together with relevant design, text, and collages. Lehman’s multimedia book garnered critical praise for its brilliant design, beautiful photography, and great reporting. The Tibetans: A Struggle to Survive (Umbrage/How Town), one of the best selling multimedia books won the Best Book Award in Pictures of the Year(POY) The book is also listed as one of the best photography books of all time by Photo Gallery Review. The accompanying exhibit, sponsored by Freedom Forum’s Newseum and Media Center, traveled nationally.

Upon the introduction of handheld video camera, he became one of the first multimedia journalists. He always preferred still photographs but felt constrained because he usually worked for weekly or monthly magazines with limited space. He felt obligated that people saw the stories he covered so he started shoot video for television networks as well. Www.nytimes.com published his work from Tibet, using his photos, video and writing. This was one of the first (maybe even the first) truly multimedia pieces published by a news organization on the Internet. The editorial director at the time was Richard Meislin and the producer on the project was Eric Jenner.

== Other photographic work ==
Lehman has traveled to nearly 50 countries, broken numerous stories, and covered many world-shaping events. Over the course of his career he covered fifteen major political conflicts. His thought provoking photographs frequently appeared in magazines such as Newsweek, The New Yorker, Time, Entertainment Weekly, U.S. News & World Report, Der Spiegel, L’Express and Stern. Some consider him to be the most significant photographer of his generation and Dr. Robert Coles, the founding editor of Doubletake Magazine, anointed him as such by writing wonderful introductions for both his books. Alison Morley, a photo editor and chair of the Documentary Photography and Photojournalism Program at the International Center of Photography (ICP), held The Tibetans: A Struggle to Survive up in front of her class announced, "this is great work, this is what you should be aspiring to." Marcel Saba, a well known photo agent, referred to him as a genius.

A world-class portrait photographer, Steve Lehman was one of the youngest photographers ever assigned by Elizabeth Biondi at The New Yorker to make portraits. Over the course of his career, he photographed four presidents, the Pope, numerous heads of state, several Nobel Prize winners and several celebrities for the world’s most prominent magazines. When Tom Cruise received his star at Mann’s Chinese Theatre in Hollywood, he was there. During the military takeover in Burma, he was with Aung San Suu Kyi in her home and the first photographer to portray her for a major magazine. When Václav Havel began to lead the Velvet Revolution in Czechoslovakia after his release from prison, Lehman was on the spot and made one of the most moving news pictures of all time. He visited with the Dalai Lama on numerous occasions and they listened to the songs of birds together in his garden. After an interview with Lehman, the Dalai Lama said to him, "You ask the best questions of all the people that have come."

== Personal life ==
After Tibet, Lehman went on to work on assignment for magazines and television networks. He often tried to cover stories that didn’t receive much attention from traditional news outlets. Though rarely home, he was based in Los Angeles in the 90’s and actually lived in the same Hollywood apartment building as artist Mike Kelley did. The building is known to have housed many creative people, including Steve Lehman’s neighbor Elizabeth Leustig, the late casting director (A River Runs Through It, Dances with Wolves), and the actor, Bill Wintersole.

== Other work ==
He made a second book, American Hollow, with Mark Bailey, and Rory Kennedy. The American Hollow book was a companion to an exhibition, lecture and award winning HBO film. This unique project tells the story of the Bowlings, a family living in the Appalachian Mountains of Kentucky. The American Hollow project won national attention and Oprah Winfrey featured the project on her show. The photographic exhibition opened at the U. S. Capitol and then traveled to the Norton Museum of Art and other art museums.

In 1996, Lehman was invited by Visa Pour L’Image to have a one-man show of Indigenous People’s Project. Visa Pour L’Image is the world’s most prestigious festival for photojournalism. He was the first artist to challenge romantic stereotypes of traditional cultures. In 1994, Lehman was in Rwanda covering the genocide. He was one of the few journalists present. Marcel Saba, who helped edit the work, said of the images, “the only time I cried at my light table was Steve Lehman’s Rwanda photos.” While in Somalia, Lehman photographed the first American soldier wounded in fighting with Somalis. Published in Newsweek, his exclusive reportage foreshadowed the failure of the United States’ policy in Somalia. In 1988, his exclusive photographs of the military takeover in Burma were rare evidence of the atrocities committed by the Burmese government.

In 2007 Lehman emerged with his bootleg show at the Whitney Museum of American Art. Mounted atop Rudolf Stingel’s aluminum covered Celotex insulation panels, his show boldly confronted the idea of museums and galleries defining who and what is important in art. He also challenged Stingel’s ownership of the panels and Lehman’s intellectual property by writing © Steve Lehman on his own art asking that it be returned. He illicitly filmed and photographed the event with his cell phone. Lehman invented the concept of a bootleg show, which is essentially a show within a show within show. It’s when an unsanctioned artist places their work in the show of another artist, films the event with their cell phone and then distributes it. Lehman considers it a homage to the artist being exhibited. Despite being unsanctioned, his bootleg show at the Whitney was a great success. One young patron who appears in these rare videos exclaimed, “It’s awesome, it’s really great you put it up.” Lehman is known to be prolific but often prefers not to exhibit his work and displays it in non-traditional ways.

== Books ==
- The Tibetans: A Struggle to Survive (Howtown / Umbrage 1998, 2003 {paperback})
- American Hollow (Bullfinch Press, Little, Brown and Company, 1999)
- Christmas Around the World (Collins Publishers, 1996), pp. 12–13, 121, 127, 150-155, 158-162, 165
- Burma’s Revolution of the Spirit (Aperture, 1994), cover, pp. 44–49, 59

== Awards ==
- Best Book Award, Pictures of the Year, 1999
- First Place in the general news category (China coverage), Pictures of the Year 1998.
- Award of Excellence in Pictures of the Year (Rwanda Coverage), 1995
- Honorable Mention, World Press Photo (coverage of the military takeover in Burma), 1989.

== Exhibitions ==
- Bootleg Show, Whitney Museum of American Art, 2007
- American Hollow (solo)
- Rotunda of The Russell Senate Office Building, Capitol Hill, Washington, DC, 1999
- HBO Gallery, New York, New York, 1999
- The Norton Museum of Art, West Palm Beach, Florida, 2000
- The Dayton Art Institute, Dayton, Ohio, 2000
- University of Kentucky, Lexington, KY, 2000
- The Chesapeake Center for the Arts, Baltimore, Maryland, 2000
- The Griffin Museum of Photography, Winchester, Massachusetts, 2001

Tibet (solo)

- The Tibetans: A Struggle to Survive, Freedom Forum's Newseum, Washington, DC, 1998
- The Tibetans: A Struggle to Survive, Freedom Forum's Newseum, New York, NY, 1999
- The Tibetans: A Struggle to Survive, Freedom Forum's Pacific Coast Center, San Francisco, CA, 1999
- The Tibetans: A Struggle to Survive, Rotunda of The Russell Senate Office Building, Capitol Hill, Washington, DC, 2001
- Visa Pour L'image (photography festival), Perpignan, France, 1996
- When the Iron Bird Flies, Nicholas Roerich Museum, New York, NY, 1993 (solo)
- The Treasures of Tibet, Rotunda of the House of Representatives Office Building, 1988 (sponsored by Tom Lantos and the Congressional Human Rights Caucus).
- Indigenous Peoples’ Project (Lakota, Tibet, Bushman), Visa Pour L'image, Perpignan, France, 1996 (solo)
- Woodstock: 1969/1994, Tribes Gallery, NY, NY, 1994 (group)

Burma

- Puffin Room, New York, NY 1996 (group)
- World Press Photo Exhibit, 1988 (group)
- Scorched Earth: Oil Well Fires in Kuwait, Houston Center of Photography, 1991 (group)
- Washington Square Park, Duke University, 1985
