= Brazil 2002: The Real Story =

2022 Netflix documentary

- Portuguese: Brasil 2002: Os Bastidores do Penta
- Directed by: Luis Ara
- Produced by: Netflix
- Distributed by: Netflix
- Release date: October 4, 2022
- Country: Brazil
- Language: Portuguese

Brazil 2002: The Real Story (Portuguese: Brasil 2002: Os Bastidores do Penta, lit. 'Brazil 2002: Behind the Scenes of the Fifth World Cup Title') itis a documentary film directed by the Uruguayan-American filmmaker Luis Ara and released on October 4, 2022. It was produced by the streaming service Netflix.

== Background ==
During the 2002 FIFA World Cup, co-hosted by South Korea and Japan, soccer player Juliano Belletti, who had been selected by Luiz Felipe Scolari for the tournament, decided to start filming behind-the-scenes footage of the Brazilian national team, capturing scenes such as training camps, trips, and locker rooms during their campaign to win their fifth World Cup title.

The film was directed by Uruguayan-American filmmaker Luis Ara. In addition to the footage captured by Belleti, the documentary features appearances and testimonials from former Brazilian national team players, opposing players, and sports journalists Arnaldo Ribeiro, Juca Kfouri, and Tim Vickery, as well as Piero Volpi, an Italian doctor with Inter Milan who treated Ronaldo's injury, enabling the athlete to compete in the 2002 World Cup.

== Cast ==
- Ronaldo
- Roberto Carlos
- Juliano Belletti
- Ronaldinho
- Cafu
- Denílson
- Vampeta
- Gilberto Silva
- Luisão
- Lúcio
- Juninho Paulista
- David Trezeguet
- Rosana
- Marc Wilmots
- Michael Owen
- Rogério Ceni
- Piero Volpi
- Hasan Şaş
- Oliver Kahn
- Pierluigi Collina
- Tim Vickery
- Arnaldo Ribeiro
- Juca Kfouri
- Felipe Massa

== Release ==
The film premiered on Netflix on October 4, 2022.

== Reception ==
=== Critics ===
Hiltor Mombach of the Rio Grande do Sul newspaper Correio do Povo praised the film and noted that "Unlike many productions of this kind, which seem to have been rushed, the film directed by Luis Ara stands out for its previously unseen footage and testimonials not only from Brazilian players, but also from opponents such as David Beckham, Michael Owen, and Oliver Kahn." In a favorable review, Eduardo Pereira, writing for the pop culture website Omelete, gave the film four out of five stars and stated, "The film's greatest brilliance, however, lies in the uniqueness of the behind-the-scenes footage captured on a home video camera. These images, when juxtaposed with the players, now retired and aged, appeal to the viewer's emotions with the bittersweetness of nostalgia. More than just dissecting the much-talked-about 'Scolari Family', as the championship team came to identify itself and was identified by the press, Brazil 2002 aims to remind Brazilians of how wonderful it was to dream."

Sandro Macedo, writing for the Folha de S.Paulo newspaper, gave the documentary just two out of five stars, noting: "Directed by Luis Ara and with Juliano Belletti (reserve right back) and Roberto Carlos (starting left back) among the producers, 'Bastidores do Penta' doesn't quite measure up to All or Nothing [...] These behind-the-scenes scenes are courtesy of Belletti, who played little and filmed a lot during the World Cup with his personal camera. The scenes are almost always of relaxed moments at the training camp or of pagode drumming on the buses on the way to the games, we can only imagine the suffering of rocker Rogério Ceni, who was part of the group." Barbara Demerov, writing for Veja São Paulo magazine, called the film "a good warm-up for the World Cup," but noted, "Thus, the real-life story itself already provides a rags-to-riches plot that audiences are accustomed to seeing in fictional films. But while the plot is already known, the production fails to reveal more behind-the-scenes secrets and elements that would add spice to the linear narrative."
