= Ethel (film) =

- Starring: Ethel Kennedy
- Music by: Miriam Cutler
- Release date: 2012
- Country: United States
- Language: English

Ethel is a 2012 documentary that premiered at the Sundance Film Festival. The subject of the documentary is Ethel Kennedy, the widow of Robert F. Kennedy. Ethel was scheduled to premiere on HBO later in 2012.

Rory Kennedy, the youngest of their 11 children, asked her mother Ethel if she would be a part of a documentary. Opening with Ethel's memories about her family, the documentary has five days worth of interviews including Ethel's children. The Kennedy family is documented in home videos and pictures.

Rory said she hoped the film would let audiences see her mother's personality and humor, and would share her story beyond the family's close circle.

The documentary is scored by Miriam Cutler.

== Plot ==
The documentary shows the story of a normal family guided by parents who are aware of the need to improve the world around them, and encourage their children to acknowledge those needs and do something about it. Scenes include the early years of the family, when they lived in the country. We see episodes of the History of the United States, and realize that the Kennedy parents and children were there.

After dealing with "Jack's" death, the director Rory Kennedy asks her mother about the death of her own father, which occurred when Ethel was expecting her. Ethel can hardly speak, and the same happens to the children, who are now grown men and women. There are scenes of the funerals, and miles of railway surrounded by people wanting to say goodbye.

After the funeral, the life of public service continued, and Ethel became an executor of her and her husband's vision. At home, she teaches her children sports, as well as establishes discipline. She does not, however, take the credit for how the children turned out.

Now, over 53 years after Robert Kennedy's assassination, they continue to be a family.

== Reception ==
On review aggregator website Rotten Tomatoes, the film holds an approval rating of 89% based on 9 reviews, with an average rating of 7.5/10.

== See also ==
- Robert F. Kennedy in media
