= Freefall: A Reckoning for Boeing =

2026 American documentary film

- Directed by: Rory Kennedy
- Produced by: Rory Kennedy; Mark Bailey; Sara Bernstein; Alexandra Korba; Viva Van Loock; Justin Wilkes
- Edited by: Don Kleszy; Jesse Overman
- Production companies: Imagine Documentaries; Moxie Films
- Distributed by: Netflix
- Release dates: June 14, 2026 (DC/DOX); August 19, 2026 (United States)
- Running time: 93 minutes
- Country: United States
- Language: English

Freefall: A Reckoning for Boeing is a 2026 documentary film directed and produced by Rory Kennedy. It is a sequel to the 2022 documentary film Downfall: The Case Against Boeing. It follows the death of Boeing whistleblower John Barnett, as other whistleblowers come forward and investigations continue.

It had its world premiere at DC/DOX Film Festival on June 14, 2026, and was released on August 19, 2026, by Netflix.

== Premise ==
Follows the death of Boeing whistleblower John Barnett, and based upon testimony of other whistleblowers who reported instances to managers who told them to overlook safety problems.

== Production ==
In July 2024, it was announced Rory Kennedy would direct a sequel to Downfall: The Case Against Boeing with Imagine Documentaries set to produce, and Netflix distribute.

== Release ==
It had its world premiere at DC/DOX Film Festival on June 14, 2026. It was released on August 19, 2026, by Netflix.

== Reception ==
On Rotten Tomatoes, 82% of 11 critic reviews are positive, with an average rating of 6.9/10. Metacritic assigned the film a weighted average score of 74 out of 100 based on 4 critics, indicating "generally favorable" reviews.

Brian Tallerico of RogerEbert.com gave the film three out of four stars writing: "Freefall: A Reckoning for Boeing,” contains more than enough righteous fury to justify your attention." John Serba of Decider praised the film writing: "Freefall is rock-solid investigative journalism. Hopefully a third documentary won’t be necessary, but I dunno about that."

Conversely, Daniel Hart of Ready Set Cut was more critical giving the film a 2.5 out of 5, writing: "The documentary is genuinely terrifying when exposing deleted safety records and cost-cutting, yet too simplistic to provide the real critique Boeing warrants."
