= Rory Kennedy =

American filmmaker (born 1968)

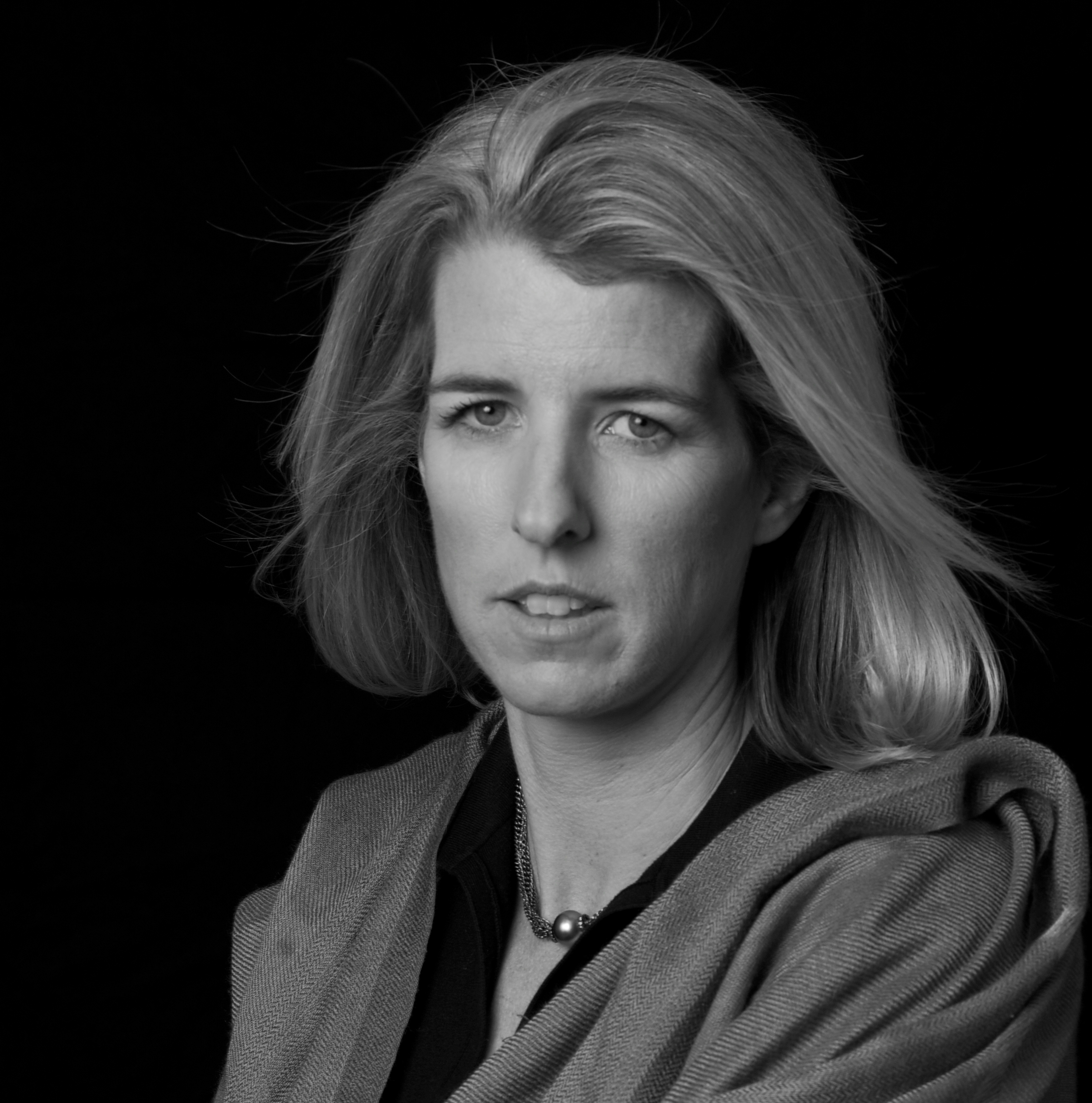
- Kennedy in 2011
- Born: Rory Elizabeth Katherine Kennedy; December 12, 1968 (age 57); Washington, D.C., U.S.
- Education: Brown University (BA)
- Occupation: Documentary filmmaker
- Years active: 1990–present
- Spouse: Mark Bailey (m. 1999)
- Children: 3
- Parent(s): Robert F. Kennedy; Ethel Skakel
- Family: Kennedy family

Rory Elizabeth Katherine Kennedy (born December 12, 1968) is an American documentary filmmaker. Kennedy has made documentary films that center on social issues such as addiction, her opposition to nuclear power, the treatment of prisoners-of-war, and the politics of the Mexican border fence.

She is the youngest child of U.S. Senator Robert F. Kennedy and Ethel Kennedy.

== Early life and education ==
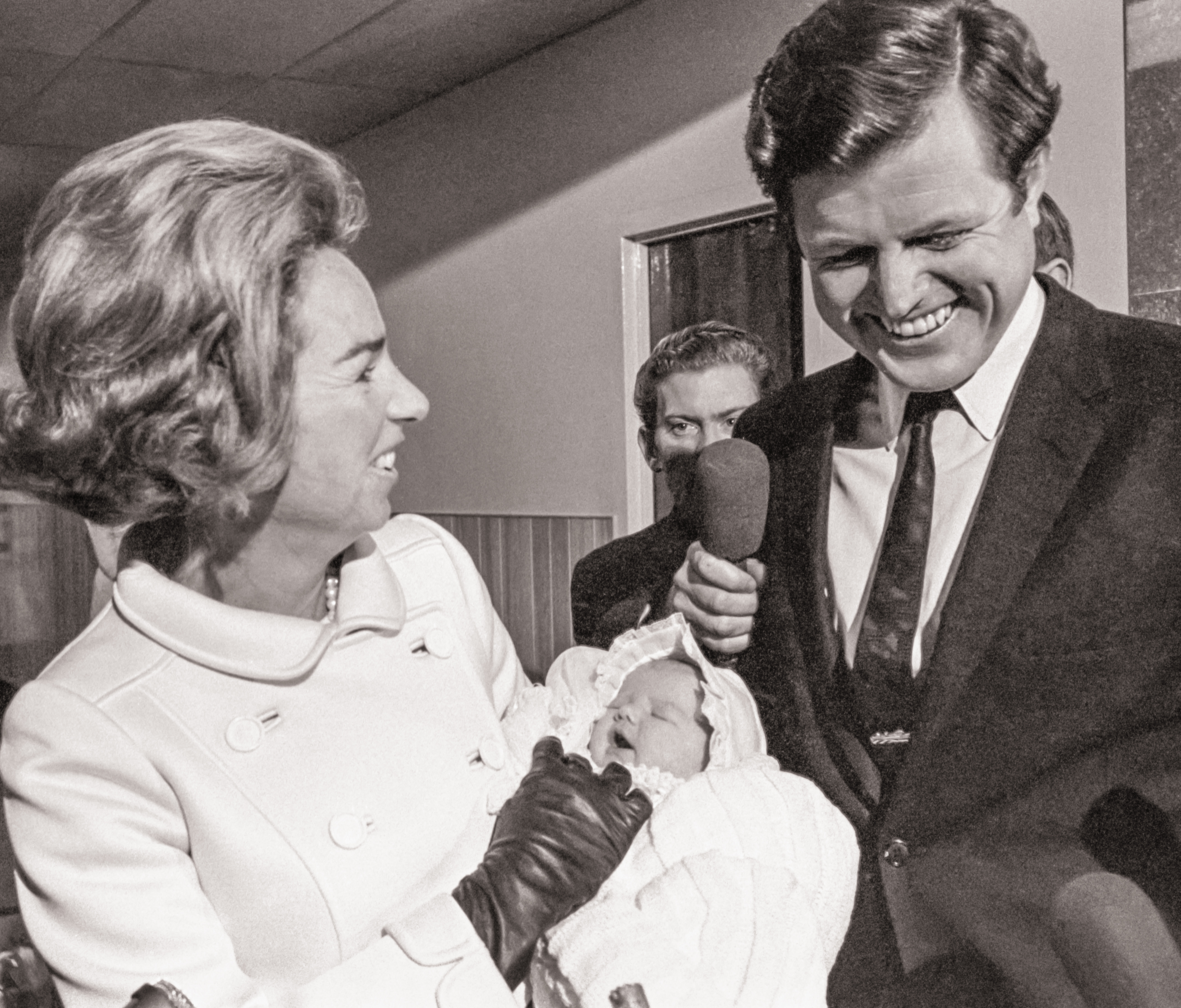
Kennedy's mother and uncle Ted introducing the newborn Kennedy to the media at Georgetown University Hospital on December 19, 1968, a week after her birth.

Rory Elizabeth Katherine Kennedy was born on December 12, 1968, at Georgetown University Hospital in Washington, D.C. to mother Ethel Kennedy. She is the eleventh and last child of former United States Attorney General, U.S. Senator, and 1968 U.S. presidential candidate Robert F. Kennedy, who was shot and killed six months prior to her birth. She is the youngest grandchild of Joseph P. Kennedy Sr. and Rose Kennedy. Her mother chose her name "Rory" after the last high king of Ireland, Rory O'Connor, who ruled in the 12th century.

On December 19, 1968, a week after Rory was born, her mother took her to her father's grave at Arlington National Cemetery. Kennedy's older brother Michael LeMoyne Kennedy was assigned as her godparent by their mother. In December 1997, she tried to resuscitate her brother Michael after a skiing accident in Aspen, Colorado, which was fatal. Friends of the Kennedy family said Rory and Michael spoke almost every day of their lives.

When Rory was a teenager, she was arrested during a protest outside the South African Embassy. When she was 15, her 28-year-old brother David died from a drug overdose. Rory graduated from Madeira School in McLean, Virginia, and then Brown University in Providence, Rhode Island. During her sophomore year at Brown, Rory organized a rally in front of a Providence supermarket. In solidarity with migrant farm workers, she urged shoppers to boycott grapes.

== Career ==
In the 1990s, Kennedy and fellow Brown classmate Vanessa Vadim (daughter of Roger Vadim and Jane Fonda) formed May Day Media, a non-profit organization based in Washington, D.C., that specializes in the production and distribution of films with a social conscience. Women of Substance was Kennedy's first documentary. The film was released in 1994, and the idea came out of a paper about female addicts that she wrote while a student at Brown. In 1998, Kennedy and another fellow Brown graduate Liz Garbus founded Moxie Firecracker Films, which specializes in documentaries that highlight pressing social issues. The television networks that have shown its films include: A&E, the UK's Channel 4, Court TV, Discovery Channel, HBO, Lifetime, MTV, Oxygen, PBS, Sundance Channel, and TLC.

She directed and co-produced American Hollow (1999), a film about a struggling Appalachian family that received critical acclaim and many awards. HBO broadcast the film and publisher Little, Brown and Company simultaneously released Kennedy's companion book. Kennedy presented the documentary at Wittenberg University on September 13, 2001. In October 2001, Kennedy traveled to Cleveland, Ohio, to address the opening meeting of the National Council of Jewish Women. At the meeting, she spoke about her documentary film-production company Change the World Through Film.

Kennedy directed and co-produced the Emmy Award-nominated series Pandemic: Facing AIDS (2003), which premiered at the International AIDS Conference in Barcelona, Spain, on July 8, 2002. It was funded by the Bill and Melinda Gates Foundation, and tells the stories of AIDS patients outside the Western world. It was broadcast in America as a five-part series on HBO in June 2003. Kennedy directed and co-produced A Boy's Life (2004), the story of a young boy and his family in rural Mississippi. The movie premiered at the 2003 Tribeca Film Festival and was awarded the Best Documentary prize at the Woodstock Film Festival; it was later broadcast on HBO.

When Kennedy was asked in a March 24, 2004, interview with Salon about her interest in the American South, she cited her father's experiences in the region as an inspiration and starting point. In the same article, she goes on to mention that showing class differences in American culture also motivates her. She directed and co-produced Indian Point: Imagining the Unimaginable (2004) for HBO, which was broadcast on September 9, 2004. The film takes a "what if" look at the catastrophic consequences of a radioactive release at the Indian Point Energy Center, a three-unit nuclear-power plant station, located 35 miles (56 km) north of midtown Manhattan, New York City, New York. Kennedy directed and co-produced Homestead Strike (2006) as part of The History Channel's series, 10 Days that Unexpectedly Changed America (April 2006).

She was a co-executive producer for Street Fight (2005), which chronicles the 2002 Newark, New Jersey, unsuccessful mayoral campaign of Democrat Cory Booker — then a Newark Municipal Councilman — against Democratic eighteen-year incumbent Mayor Sharpe James. The film earned an Academy Award nomination for Best Documentary (Feature). (Booker later won the mayoral election on May 9, 2006, against Democratic Ronald Rice; James did not seek re-election for another four-year term in 2006.)

Kennedy directed and co-produced Ghosts of Abu Ghraib (2007), which premiered at the Sundance Film Festival and won the 2007 Primetime Emmy Award for Best Documentary. Kennedy first learned of the Abu Ghraib prison practices when images came out in the media, which were accompanied by a New Yorker article by Seymour Hersh. According to Kennedy, she was "horrified and shocked and disgusted" by the images of the naked prisoners and laughing American soldiers. She conducted interviews with people who were present at the prison along with those directly involved in the abuse. Kennedy's opinion of the participants changed after she interviewed them, when she began feeling they "were very humane and very much like me" and discovered they "were not monsters". She directed Thank You, Mr. President: Helen Thomas at the White House for HBO Documentary Films, which premiered on HBO on August 18, 2008. According to reviews, the 40-minute-long documentary provided an interesting, though brief, glimpse into the iconic journalist.

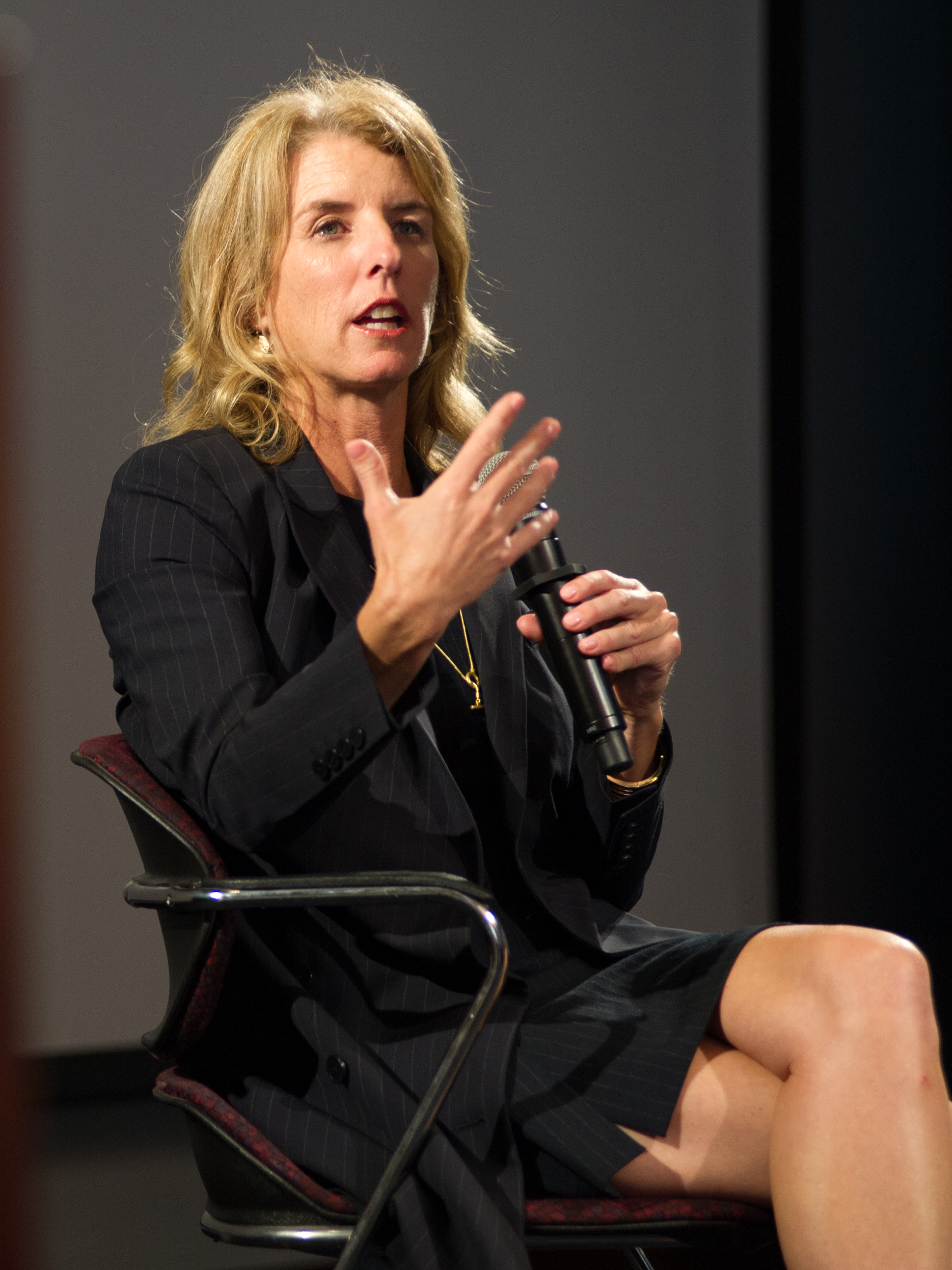
Kennedy speaks at a screening of her 2018 documentary, Above and Beyond: NASA's Journey to Tomorrow

On June 30, 2009, Kennedy was invited to join the Academy of Motion Picture Arts and Sciences. Kennedy directed The Fence (La Barda), which premiered at the opening night of The Sundance Film Festival 2010. The film made its debut on HBO on September 16, 2010. Favorably received, it details the woeful inadequacies of the border fence between the United States and Mexico, which has increased migrants' deaths, but does not deter illegal immigration. In 2011, she produced and directed Ethel, which was a documentary about her mother. The movie premiered at the 2012 Sundance Film Festival and aired on HBO on October 18, 2012. Reviews portrayed the documentary as a moving tribute, but criticized its lack of depth. Kennedy conducted interviews with her siblings over five days at the Kennedy family compound in Hyannis Port. For the finished film, she went through "some 100 hours" of archive footage, photos and home videos.

Last Days in Vietnam was directed by Kennedy and co-produced with Keven McAlester; the documentary film debuted at the Sundance Film Festival in January 2014. During production of the film, she spoke with U.S. military and Vietnam nationals now in the U.S. and said the most exciting part of the film to her was "telling the untold stories about Americans and Vietnamese who were on the ground, who went against U.S. policy and risked their lives to save Vietnamese". Kennedy was reported to have signed with production company Nonfiction Unlimited in May 2014. In September 2014, Last Days in Vietnam opened at the Nuart Theater in Los Angeles. Kennedy had difficulty getting some of the people featured in her film to get involved. Out of them, she believed Henry Kissinger had the most reluctance to the project. On their reluctance, Kennedy stated: "I think a lot of those folks suffered post-traumatic stress from that moment. When I asked them to relive it, it really took a toll. Many of the people told me it took them a week to recover from the interviews. I've gotten tons of emails from people in Vietnam who can't see the film because it's too traumatic for them". Last Days in Vietnam was nominated as Best Documentary Feature for the 87th Academy Awards.

In 2024, Kennedy directed and produced The Synanon Fix a documentary series revolving around Synanon for HBO. In early 2024, Film Training Manitoba based in Winnipeg, Canada announced Kennedy as the distinguished speaker for the Manitoba Film Master Series which took place at the Manitoba Institute of Trades and Technology (MITT). The Film Master Series included a session with Kennedy instructing specifically for women, non-binary, and Trans participants. In 2025, Kennedy directed and produced The Trial of Alec Baldwin which had its world premiere at DOC NYC in November 2025, revolving around Alec Baldwin and the Rust shooting incident.

== Activism and politics ==
Kennedy advocates for several social activism organizations and sits on the board of numerous non-profit organizations. In March 2010, Kennedy gave a presentation at The Ritz-Carlton, where she spoke on the effects of alcohol and drug abuse and concluded that addiction and domestic violence "are intricately connected." She also voiced her support of treatment options, calling them "more important than the criminal justice approach". Executive director and CEO of Comprehensive Alcoholism Rehabilitation Programs Robert Bozzone agreed with her opinion and added: "If you listen to Rory, treatment is more effective than incarceration". Referring to the shooting of Michael Brown, Kennedy believed the reason it garnered national media attention "is that it's a touch point that indicates a larger social challenge that we all need to mull over and try to grapple with in a thoughtful and considerate way, and I think it has to do both with race and class."

Kennedy announced her support of Barack Obama as the Democratic Party's nominee in the 2008 U.S. presidential election in an op-ed essay, "Two fine choices, one clear decision - Obama". She endorsed Democratic presidential nominee Hillary Clinton in 2016.

On January 11, 2019, Kennedy co-authored a Rolling Stone opinion piece with Red Hot Chili Peppers singer Anthony Kiedis and the Malibu Foundation's Trevor Neilson on the current climate crisis. Also in 2019, Kennedy co-founded the Climate Emergency Fund along with Getty family heiress Aileen Getty. The fund has distributed over $4 million to several environmental activist organizations including Extinction Rebellion and Just Stop Oil.

On April 1, 2024, during an appearance on Good Morning America to promote her new docuseries, The Synanon Fix, Kennedy expressed her wish that voters in the 2024 United States presidential election not vote for her brother, Robert F. Kennedy Jr., to avoid pulling Democratic votes away from Joe Biden. She endorsed Biden's candidacy, making the announcement in April 2024 alongside five additional siblings of her and Robert.

After Biden dropped out, Kennedy endorsed Vice President Kamala Harris's campaign, after their siblings denounced her brother Robert Jr.'s decision to endorse former President Donald Trump, calling the move a "betrayal".

== Personal life ==
"Because he was killed before I was born, it meant I never had the chance to see my father’s face and he never had the chance to see mine. He never tossed me in the air, taught me to ride a bicycle, dropped me off at my freshman dorm, walked me down the aisle."

— Rory Kennedy talking about her father during her opposition to her father's assassin's release in a September 2021 guest essay in The New York Times.

Following college graduation, Kennedy moved to New York and then briefly to Los Angeles. Kennedy's brother Michael LeMoyne Kennedy died in December 1997 as a result of a skiing accident. She was with him at the time of the accident and tried to save his life by giving him mouth-to-mouth resuscitation. Despite her efforts, he had been fatally injured. Kennedy attended his funeral in January 1998.

On August 2, 1999, Kennedy married Mark Bailey in Greece at the mansion of shipping tycoon Vardis Vardinoyiannis. Kennedy met Bailey in Washington through mutual friends after graduating from Brown University. The wedding was originally scheduled for July 17 in Hyannis Port, Massachusetts, but was postponed after the plane piloted by her cousin John F. Kennedy Jr. and passengers Carolyn Bessette-Kennedy (his wife) and her sister, Lauren Bessette crashed en route to the event. The tent erected for the wedding instead became a site for family prayers during the search for her family members.

In October 1999, Kennedy and her husband moved to a new home in a West Village neighborhood they reportedly loved.

Kennedy and her husband have two daughters and a son.

Around the time of the birth of her second daughter in 2004, Kennedy and her husband purchased a home. Kennedy went on maternity leave from her filmmaking career for the birth of her son in 2007. She sold her Shelter Island home in December 2009.

According to Trulia.com, Kennedy purchased a home in Malibu, California, in January 2013 and currently resides there.

== Public image ==
Prior to the 1990s, Kennedy was said to have been known solely for being the child who was born after the assassination of her father, Robert F. Kennedy. Following the plane crash of her cousin John F. Kennedy Jr., she established notability for being the cousin whose wedding he planned to attend. Anita Gates of The New York Times wrote that Kennedy would understandably want to be known as "the one who became a filmmaker."

Edward Klein wrote in his book The Kennedy Curse: Why Tragedy Has Haunted America's First Family for 150 Years that Rory Kennedy "had suffered more from the Kennedy Curse than any other member of the family". Klein then listed the deaths of her father and brother David, as well as her role in unsuccessfully attempting to save the life of her brother Michael Kennedy.

Kennedy has spoken of her work and its relation to that of her father. "I don't think of it as a continuation of his work, but I certainly think I was influenced by the person that he was and have made a range of choices because of what he contributed to the world. I have enormous respect for all that he accomplished in his short life and how much he was able to move people and touch people. I've certainly been inspired by that". On January 14, 2010, Full Frame announced Kennedy and Liz Garbus would be the recipients of that year's Career Award. In the press release, Full Frame called the duo's work "unique".

== Works ==
=== Bibliography ===
- Kennedy, Rory; Lehman, Steve; Bailey, Mark (1999). American Hollow. Boston. Bulfinch Press (Little, Brown). ISBN 0-8212-2631-2

=== Documentary filmography (as director) ===
- American Hollow (1999)
- Different Moms (1999)
- Epidemic Africa (1999)
- The Changing Face of Beauty (2000)
- America: Up In Arms (2000)
- All Kinds of Families (2001)
- Healthy Start (2001)
- Pandemic: Facing AIDS (2003)
- A Boy's Life (2004)
- Indian Point: Imagining the Unimaginable (2004)
- Homestead Strike (2006)
- Ghosts of Abu Ghraib (2007)
- Thank You Mr. President: Helen Thomas at the White House (2008)
- The Fence (2010)
- Ethel (2012)
- Last Days in Vietnam (2014)
- Take Every Wave: The Life of Laird Hamilton (2017)
- Without a Net: The Digital Divide in America (2017)
- Above and Beyond: NASA's Journey to Tomorrow (2018)
- The Volcano: Rescue from Whakaari (2022)
- Downfall: The Case Against Boeing (2022)
- The Synanon Fix (2024)
- The Trial of Alec Baldwin (2025)
- Queen of Chess (2026)
- Freefall: A Reckoning for Boeing (2026)

=== Documentary filmography (as producer) ===
- The Execution of Wanda Jean (2002)
- Sixteen (2002) in four parts:
  - Schooling Jewel
  - Sex Talk
  - Pepa's Fight
  - Refuse to Lose
- Hidden Crisis: Women and AIDS (2002)
- Together: Stop Violence Against Women (2003)
- The Nazi Officer's Wife (2003)
- Girlhood (2004)
- Xiara's Song (2004)
- Street Fight (2005)
- Yo Soy Boricua (2006)
- Ghosts of Abu Ghraib (2007)
- Coma (2007)
- Shouting Fire: Stories from the Edge of Free Speech (2009)
- The Fence (2010)
- Bobby Fischer Against the World (2011)
- Ethel (2012)

== See also ==
- Kennedy curse
- Kennedy family
