= List of documentary films about World War II =

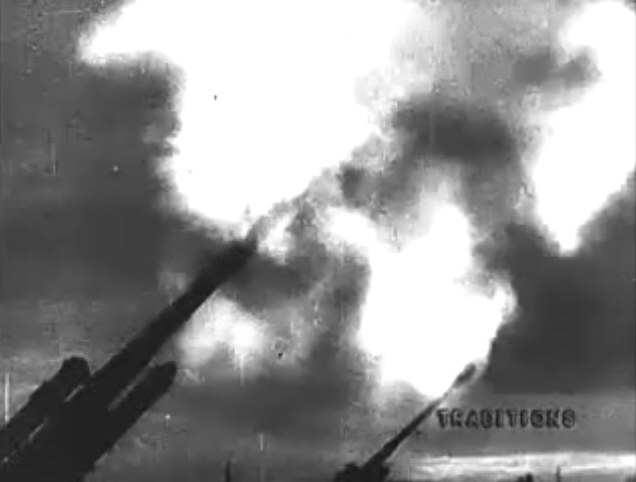
Anti-aircraft guns fire at night in Moscow Strikes Back (USSR, 1942)

The following is a list of documentary films about World War II.

== 1940s ==
Year	Country	Title	Director	Notes
1940	Nazi Germany	Deutsche Panzer (German Panzer)	Walter Ruttmann	Nazi propaganda film showcasing German tank manufacturing.
1940	Nazi Germany	Deutsche Waffenschmieden (German Weapons-Forge)	Walter Ruttmann	Nazi propaganda film about the might of German arms manufacturing.
1940	Nazi Germany	Feldzug in Polen (Campaign in Poland)		Nazi propaganda film about the 1939 invasion of Poland, portraying the Poles as aggressors and the ethnic Germans living in Poland as oppressed minorities.
1941	Canada	Churchill's Island	Stuart Legg	British propaganda film showcasing the defense of the British Isles during the Battle of Britain.
1941	Canada	Inside Fighting China	Stuart Legg	Canadian propaganda film showcasing China's resistance to Japan's invasion.
1941	USA	Kukan	Rey Scott	American propaganda film showcasing China's resistance to Japan's invasion.
1941	Kingdom of Italy	Uomini sul fondo (Men on the bottom)	Francesco De Robertis	
1942	Nazi Germany	Männer, Meer und Stürme (Men, Sea and Storms)	Heinrich Hauser, Hubert Schonger	
1942	United Kingdom	The Soldier's Food	unknown	British military training film about the importance of food, including topics like demonstrations of cooking equipment, prevention of waste, and the management of surplus food.
1944	Nazi Germany	Panorama		
1944	United States	The Battle for the Marianas	Gordon Hollingshead	American propaganda film about the US invasion of the Japanese occupies islands of Guam, Saipan, and Tinian.
1944	Japan	Calling Australia (Japanese: オーストラリアを呼び出します, romanized: Ōsutoraria o Yobidashimasu)	Dr. Huyung (formerly known as Hinatsu Eitaro, Hae Yeong, and Hŏ Yŏng)	Japanese propaganda film showing Australian prisoners of war drinking beer, playing sports, eating balanced meals. It was intended to train the Australian public to accept occupation of their country by the Japanese military.
1944	United States	Memphis Belle: A Story of a Flying Fortress	William Wyler	US propaganda film providing an account of the final mission of the crew of the Memphis Belle, a Boeing B-17 Flying Fortress. It was intended to build morale at home by showing the everyday courage of the soldiers who flew these bombers.
1945	Netherlands	Nippon Presents		Dutch counter propagranda film showing the true treatment inside Japanese POW camps.
1945	Denmark	Danmark i Lænker (Denmark in Chains)	Sven Methling	Danish film chronicling the 5 years of Nazi occupation of Denmark.
1946	United States	Let There Be Light	y Huston	American short documentary film intended to educate the public about post-traumatic stress disorder and its treatment among returning veterans, but its unscripted presentation of mental disability caused the U.S. government to suppress the film, and it was not released until the 1980s.
1947	United States	Lest We Forget	n.a.	

== 1950s ==
Year	Country	Title	Director	Notes
1952	United States	Victory at Sea	M. Clay Adams	
1955	France	Night and Fog	Alain Resnais	French documentary showcasing the abandoned grounds of Auschwitz and Majdanek established in occupied Poland while describing the lives of prisoners in the camps. The film also talks about the rise of Nazi ideology.

== 1960s ==
Year	Country	Title	Director
1962	United States	Black Fox: The Rise and Fall of Adolf Hitler	Louis Clyde Stoumen
1962	Canada	Canada at War	?
1964	Canada	Fields of Sacrifice	Donald Brittain
1965	Canada	Memorandum	Donald Brittain, John Spotton
1965	United States	France: Conquest to Liberation	Aram Boyajian
1965	United States	Prelude to War: Beginning of World War II	Alan Landsburg
1965	Soviet Union	Ordinary Fascism (Обыкновенный фашизм) (Obyknovennyy fashizm)	Mikhail Romm
1968	United States	The Rise and Fall of the Third Reich	Jack Kaufman
1969	France	The Sorrow and the Pity (Le Chagrin et la Pitié)	Marcel Ophüls

== 1970s ==
Year	Country	Title	Director
1973	United Kingdom	The World at War	Miscellaneous
1974	Israel	The 81st Blow (המכה ה-81)	Haim Gouri
1976	United Kingdom	The Memory of Justice	Marcel Ophüls
1977	United Kingdom	The Secret War (TV series)	Various
1978	Soviet Union	The Unknown War (Neizvestnaya voyna) (Неизвестная война)	Isaac Kleinerman, Roman Karmen

== 1980s ==
Year	Country	Title	Director
1980	West Germany	The Yellow Star - The Persecution of the Jews in Europe 1933-45	Dieter Hildebrandt
1981	United States	The Life and Times of Rosie the Riveter	Connie Field
1982	United States	Genocide	Arnold Schwartzman
1982	Sweden	The Story of Chaim Rumkowski and the Jews of Lodz	Peter Chohen, Bo Kuritzen
1982	United States	Who Shall Live and Who Shall Die	Laurence Jarvik
1985	France	Shoah	Claude Lanzmann
1985	United States	Unfinished Business	Steven Okazaki
1987	Japan	The Emperor's Naked Army Marches On	Kazuo Hara
1988	France	Hôtel Terminus: The Life and Times of Klaus Barbie	Marcel Ophüls
1989	France	De Nuremberg à Nuremberg	Frédéric Rossif
1989	United Kingdom	Fascist Legacy	Ken Kirby
1989	Sweden	The Architecture of Doom	Peter Cohen

== 1990s ==
Year	Country	Title	Director
1990	United States	Days of Waiting: The Life & Art of Estelle Ishigo	Steven Okazaki
1990	Germany	Mein Krieg	Harriet Eder, Thomas Kufus
1992	Canada	The Valour and the Horror	Brian McKenna
1993	France	L'Œil de Vichy	Claude Chabrol
1994	United States	Battlefield	Miscellaneous
1994	Germany	The Jewess and the Captain	Ulf von Mechow
1994	Spain	Memory of Water	Héctor Fáver
1995	United Kingdom	Anne Frank Remembered	Jon Blair
1995	United States	One Survivor Remembers	Kary Antholis
1995	South Korea	Najeun moksori	Young-Joo Byun
1996	United States	Fire on the Mountain	Beth Gage, George Gage
1997	United States	The Long Way Home	Mark Jonathan Harris
1997	United Kingdom	The Nazis: A Warning from History	Laurence Rees, Tilman Remme
1997	Estonia	We Lived for Estonia	Andres Sööt
1998	United States	Nazis: The Occult Conspiracy	Tracy Atkinson, Joan Baran
1998	United States	Pola's March	Jonathan Gruber
1998	United States	The Last Days	James Moll
1998	Netherlands	The Saved	Paul Cohen, Oeke Hoogendijk
1998	United States	Voices of the Children	Zuzana Justman
1998	Canada	Unwanted Soldiers	Jari Osborne
1999	United Kingdom	The Second World War in Colour	Polly Bide
1999	United Kingdom	War of the Century	Laurence Rees

== 2000s ==
Year	Country	Title	Director
2000	Czech Republic	A Story about a Bad Dream	Pavel Stingl
2000	United States	From Swastika to Jim Crow	Lori Cheatle, Martin D. Toub
2000	United States	Into the Arms of Strangers: Stories of the Kindertransport	Mark Jonathan Harris
2000	Germany	Paragraph 175	Rob Epstein, Jeffrey Friedman
2000	Germany	Shadows of Memory	Claudia von Alemann
2000	United States	Sisters in Resistance	Maia Wechsler
2000	United Kingdom	The Children Who Cheated the Nazis	Sue Read
2000	United Kingdom	World War II׃ The Complete History	Matthew Hall
2001	United Kingdom	Horror in the East	Laurence Rees, Martina Balazova
2001	Japan	Japanese Devils	Minoru Matsui
2001	France	Sobibor, Oct. 14, 1943, 4 p.m.	Claude Lanzmann
2001	United States	The Color of War	Peter Coyote
2002	United States	A Yiddish World Remembered	Andrew Goldberg
2002	Austria	Blind Spot: Hitler's Secretary	André Heller, Othmar Schmiderer
2002	United States	Secret Lives: Hidden Children and Their Rescuers During WWII	Aviva Slesin
2002	Canada	The Boys of Buchenwald	Audrey Mehler
2003	United States	Marion's Triumph	John Chua
2003	Denmark	Med ret til at dræbe (With a Right to Kill)	Morten Henriksen, Peter Øvig Knudsen
2003	Canada	Prisoner of Paradise	Malcolm Clarke, Stuart Sender
2003	United States	The Holocaust Experience	Oeke Hoogendijk
2004	United Kingdom	Dunkirk	Alex Holmes
2004	Netherlands	Goodbye Holland	Willy Lindwer
2004	United States	Hidden Fuhrer: Debating the Enigma of Hitler's Sexuality	Fenton Bailey, Randy Barbato
2004	United States	Hiding and Seeking	Menachem Daum, Oren Rudavsky
2005	Germany	2 or 3 Things I Know About Him	Malte Ludin
2005	United States	A Note of Triumph: The Golden Age of Norman Corwin	Eric Simonson
2005	United Kingdom	Auschwitz: The Nazis and the 'Final Solution'	Laurence Rees, Catherine Tatge
2005	United Kingdom	Hiroshima	Paul Wilmshurst
2005	United Kingdom	Japan's War in Colour	David Batty
2005	United States	The 11th Day: Crete 1941	Christos Epperson
2005	United States	The Mushroom Club	Steven Okazaki
2005	Poland	The Portraitist	Ireneusz Dobrowolski
2005	Austria	Unwanted Cinema	Petrus van der Let
2006	Russia	Blokada	Sergei Loznitsa
2006	United States	Forgiving Dr. Mengele	Bob Hercules, Cheri Pugh
2006	United States	The Rape of Europa	Richard Berge, Bonni Cohen, Nicole Newnham
2006	Estonia	The Blue Hills	Raimo Jõerand
2007	United States	A Distant Shore: African Americans of D-Day	Douglas Cohen
2007	Canada	My Opposition: The Diaries of Friedrich Kellner	Fern Levitt
2007	United States	Nanking	Bill Guttentag, Dan Sturman
2007	United States	Order Castles of the Third Reich	R.J. Adams
2007	United States	Ruins of the Reich	R.J. Adams
2007	Israel	Stalags	Ari Libsker
2007	United States	The War	Ken Burns, Lynn Novick
2007	United States	White Light/Black Rain: The Destruction of Hiroshima and Nagasaki	Steven Okazaki
2007	United States	Wings of Defeat	Risa Morimoto
2007	Japan	Yasukuni	Li Ying
Year	Country	Title	Director
2008	United States	Battle 360°	Tony Long
2008	Germany	Harlan – In the Shadow of Jew Süss	Felix Moeller
2008	Netherlands	Tulip Time: The Rise and Fall of the Trio Lescano	Tonino Boniotti, Marco De Stefanis
2008	Latvia	The Soviet Story	Edvīns Šnore
2008	United Kingdom	World War II Behind Closed Doors: Stalin, the Nazis and the West	Laurence Rees, Andrew Williams
2009	France	Apocalypse: The Second World War	Isabelle Clarke, Daniel Costelle
2009	United States	The Inheritance of War	Ashley Karras
2009	Netherlands	Patton 360°	Tony Long
2009	Finland	Sisters Across the Gulf of Finland	Imbi Paju
2009	United Kingdom	The Week We Went to War	Malcolm McKissock, Louise Pirie
2009	United Kingdom	World War II in HD Colour	Robert Powell, Matthew Barrett
2009	United States	WWII in HD	Frederic Lumiere, Matthew Ginsburg
2009	United States	Valor With Honor	Torasan Films

== 2010s ==
Year	Country	Title	Director
2010		War Music	David Porteous
2011	United States	We Were There	Jarod O'Flaherty
2011	Netherlands	900 Days	Jessica Gorter
2011	United Kingdom	The Rise and Fall of the Japanese Empire	Stewart Binns
2011	Russia	Soviet Storm: World War II in the East	Anna Grazhdan
2012	United Kingdom	Britain at War in Colour	Stewart Binns
2012	United States	Oliver Stone's Untold History of the United States	Oliver Stone
2013	United States	The Ghost Army	Rick Beyer
2014	United States	Second War Diary: The War Day by Day	José Delgado
2015	Germany	Hostages of the SS	Christian Frey
2016	Australia	A Long Way Back	Samm Blake
2018	Italy	Visconti's Eagles	Claudio Costa
2019	United Kingdom	Greatest Events of WWII in Colour	Sam Taplin, Nicky Bolster, Kasia Uscinska, Josh Whitehead & Ailsa Fereday

== 2020s ==
Year	Country	Title	Director
2021	United Kingdom	WWII in Color: Road to Victory	Sam Taplin, Lou Westlake, Kim Lask, Stan Griffin & Katie Boxer
2026	United States	World War II with Tom Hanks	David Belton, Annabel Hobley, Mark Radice, Shaun Trevisick & Duncan Singh

== See also ==
- List of Allied propaganda films of World War II
- List of World War II films
- List of World War II TV series
- List of World War II short films
- List of Holocaust films
