= Shadows of Memory =

- Claudia von Alemann with her mother
- Directed by: Claudia von Alemann
- Release date: 2000
- Running time: 43 min.
- Language: German with English subtitles

Shadows of Memory is a 2000 documentary by Claudia von Alemann that describes the rise and fall of Hitler from the perspective of a Nazi supporter—Alemann's 84-year-old mother.

== Summary ==
Shadows of Memory caps a series of documentaries von Alemann filmed on the history of Germany, this time turning her lens on the Holocaust. She returns to the town of her family's origins where the lush landscapes contrast with the jarring truth her mother shares with daughter and granddaughter. Letting their conversation flow naturally, the intimate documentary explores how anti-Semitism developed in Germany and how average citizens ignored the evils of the Holocaust.

Alemann juxtaposes the serenity and placidity of the nature shots with the brutality and horrors her speakers are forced to address. They sit on park benches or walk down forested paths, but the intensity of their thoughts distract them from the beauty of their surroundings. The film opens with the documentary maker herself sitting on the edge of a lush pond with her mother. While the beauty of the lavish greens, the warm sun, the gentle rustling of the water cannot be ignored, the loaded conversation quickly begins to dominate the viewer's attention.

And that is not the only contrast in appearance. Many people would be embarrassed to admit their own ignorance and prejudice, but von Alemann's mother is unafraid. With her curly white hair, glasses, and a soft face full of wrinkles, she looks like a benevolent, cookie-baking, story-telling grandmother. But her stories reveal the role she played in perpetuating a prejudice that lead to genocide. Raised in the small Christian town of Seebach, she was led to believe Germans were an especially brave, hardworking, and moral race. She had no direct experience with Jews, so when she was told as a child that Jews had "crooked noses and crooked legs" she accepted the slander blindly. When she was introduced to Jews for the first time, at a dance, she was surprised and commented to a friend, "They’re just like us."

Still, as a young adult reading Hitler's Mein Kampf, she sympathized with, and felt excited by, the pro-German sentiment, while glossing over the anti-Semitism. And she was proud of her husband for serving as a commanding soldier in the German army.

Shadows of Memory lets camera linger on the faces of the speakers, picking up on the thoughts their expressions reveal that their words do not. The unrelenting camera also traps the speakers in its grasp, forcing them to confront the difficult subjects they are discussing. Just as the camera does not look away, the characters cannot ignore the horrors that have transpired in their own land, on their own watch. Misty eyes blink repeatedly, lips are bitten, and faces contort in an attempt to control overwhelming sorrow and frustration.

The documentary explores how one person's actions affect other people. While von Alemann's mother was not directly involved in the torture or murder of Europe's Jews, her ignorance, compliance and nationalism allowed the atrocities to occur. The effects of her inaction – and that of the ordinary German citizens of her generation – continue, rippling down to her granddaughter's generation as well. The seventeen-year-old girl is forced to grapple with frustration, shame, and sorrow that is the legacy left by her grandmother.

== Film festivals ==
- Figueira da Foz, International Film Festival, Portugal
- Women Make Waves Film Festival, Taiwan
- Dubrovnik International Documentary Film Festival, Croatia
- Women's Film Festival, Seoul, Korea
- International Documentary Film Festival, Rio de Janeiro
- Rencontres Internationales du Documentaire, Montreal

== Reception ==
Shadows of Memory is sensitive to the fact that Alemann's mother's prejudice was rooted in ignorance. But, nonetheless, the documentary is still critical of her behavior. The film has been described as "candid" and "deeply moving."

== See also ==
Other World War II documentaries:

- Goodbye Holland
- Marion's Triumph
- Paradise Camp
- Pola's March
- A Story about a Bad Dream
- Boys of Buchenwald
- The Sixth Battalion
- The Story of Chaim Rumkowski and the Jews of Lodz
- They Were Not Silent
