= Hanuszka =

- Directed by: Nurit Kedar
- Release date: April 7, 2006
- Running time: 66 minutes
- Languages: Polish with English subtitles

Hanuszka is a 2006 film by Nurit Kedar that tells the true story of a Jewish girl who survived the Holocaust in a convent, where she got to know Pope John Paul II. The film blends documentary and narrative elements to tell the atypical story of how Hanna Mandelberger escaped the Warsaw Ghetto.

== Summary ==
Hanuszka uses symbolism as it explores a Jewish girl's war-time experience that drove her to embrace the Catholic Church. The film shows how Hanna struggles have stayed with her by blending contemporary footage of the grown, real-life Hanna as she travels through Warsaw with a reenacted narrative account of her childhood. Telling the story from two angles, Hanuszka is able to depict both the fear and innocence of a child's experience and the insights that come with age and reflection.

Before the Germans occupied Poland, Hanna lived a peaceful life with her sister and parents, practicing piano and playing on the train tracks by her house. But after the occupation, they were relocated to the Warsaw ghetto where, Hanna says, there was “nothing, nothing, but dirt, tiles, and bodies, and screaming.” It's not long before Hanna realizes that the only things separating her from a life among “trees” and “flowers” and “people with brushed hair” are six bricks of the ghetto wall and her Jewish identity.

The kindness of the nuns and priests who take care of Hanna and a child's normal wish for approval help to draw Hanna into the Catholic faith. Plus, her isolating situation causes her to relate to Jesus and the story of the cross. “I wore the cross,” she says of the Christian symbol of suffering, “it was with me; it was mine.”

Dealing with a topic that's been controversial for some time, Hanuszka enters the heated debate over what Pope John Paul II did during World War II. Born Karol Wojtyla, he has been both attacked and praised for his actions during the war. Some have accused him of ignoring the Holocaust by escaping into life in the seminary while others argue that he defied the Nazis by smuggling false papers to Jews, helping to put on pro-Jewish plays, and defending those he could. Hanna, for one, is convinced that he was a part of the Polish resistance, and the secret package she was told to deliver to him, in her mind, serves as proof.

== Reception ==
Regional Jewish organizations in the United States regularly host screening of the film. For example, Jewish Federation of Cincinnati chose Hanuszka for the special screening at the Xavier University commemorating 60 years of Israeli independence. Vancouver Jewish Film Festival hosted screenings of the film in 2008.

== See also ==
Other Documentaries about Children Holocaust survivors:

- The Boys of Buchenwald
- Marion's Triumph
- A Story about a Bad Dream
- Pola's March
