= The Holocaust Experience =

- Directed by: Oeke Hoogendijk
- Release date: 2003
- Running time: 50 minutes
- Language: English

The Holocaust Experience is a 2003 documentary by Oeke Hoogendijk that takes a serious, slightly critical, look at Holocaust museums around the globe. The film asks where the line between remembering the genocide and exploiting the dead lies and if it's already been crossed.

== Summary ==
Putting Holocaust victims' hair on display became a controversial exhibit for the United States Holocaust Museum, when survivors protested that the display would be an exploitation of those who had died. The Holocaust Experience looks at this and other moral questions surrounding what has become an industry of remembrance.

Sixty years after the Holocaust, survivors are dying and concentration camp infrastructure is beginning to decay. Deliberate efforts must be made in order to preserve the past. Few would argue the importance of remembering; but is there something wrong with learning about the Holocaust through blockbuster films, or with hopping off a tour bus, in fanny pack and sunscreen, into a concentration camp?

The Holocaust Experience moves between the noisy, hyper-realistic Holocaust museums in America and the decaying ruins of Auschwitz to quietly critique the role of both as proper memorials. At the Holocaust Museum in Washington D.C., animated tour guides give rehearsed speeches that try to both shock and entertain their groups, while in Poland, tourists arrive at Auschwitz on buses with "Kraków Tours" painted on the side, and pose for pictures at the entrance gate, below the notorious sign reading "Arbeit Macht Frei" (work makes you free).

Auschwitz was once the largest of the Nazi concentration camps, where 1.1 million people were murdered. But sixty years have passed since the world learned of the genocide that took place there, and now the documentary's camera captures icy, poetic shots of beautiful young girls jogging around the camp, little boys playing soccer nearby, and a woman hanging up her laundry to dry right next to its fence. Earth that was stained with the blood of over a million people is now casually trod on every day.

The truth is, survivors agree, if you did not live through the Holocaust, you will never know their fear, and never fully understand the horrors. "I try to paint a picture that will stir them up, get them thinking," a survivor who serves as a tour guide says, "but I never expect the audience to understand what it was like."

== See also ==
- List of Holocaust memorials and museums
- Holocaust Memorial Days

Other Holocaust Documentaries:

- Who Shall Live and Who Shall Die
- Chaim Rumkowski and the Jews of Lodz
- Luboml
- Shadows of Memory
- The Jewess and the Captain
- Paradise Camp
