= Goodbye Holland =

2004 film by Willy Lindwer

- Directed by: Willy Lindwer
- Produced by: Willy Lindwer and AVA Productions
- Release date: 2004
- Running time: 90 minutes
- Country: Netherlands
- Languages: English, and Dutch with English subtitles

Goodbye Holland is a 2004 documentary about the extermination of Dutch Jews during World War II. The film debunks the accepted notion that the Dutch were 'good' during the war, exposing how Dutch police and civil servants helped the German occupying regime implement massive deportations, which resulted in the death of 78 percent of the Jews in the Netherlands.

In truth, the above death rate of Jews from the Netherlands masks the much greater tragedy. There were approximately 140,000 Jews in the Netherlands at the time of the German invasion in May 1940. They included about 25,000 Jews who escaped mostly from Germany and Austria and some from other countries. When the deportations began in 1942 the Nazis did not deport Jews in mixed marriages. About 25,000 Jews were exempt from deportation or went into hiding, half of whom who were hiding were caught or betrayed. Of the 107,000 Jews from the Netherlands actually deported to the concentration camps only about 5000 survived, about 4%. So the actual death rate of arrested, deported and murdered Jews from the Netherlands was closer to 96%.

The documentary was made by Emmy Award winning director Willy Lindwer.

== Summary ==
Anne Frank is perhaps the most familiar symbol of the Holocaust in the Netherlands, remembered for the diary in which she recorded her thoughts, feelings and reflections during her family's two years in hiding. But Anne's memory is most important as a symbol of the senseless destruction of Dutch Jewry, and the deeply rooted antisemitism in Dutch society that allowed for, and even encouraged, the murder of more than 100,000 Jews. Goodbye Holland tells the story of Dutch antisemitism and collaboration with the Nazis — which resulted in the highest percentage of Jewish fatalities in all of Western Europe — through the lens of one man's personal quest to put together the pieces of his family's history.

"What happened was not just the result of German evil. The Dutch were not willing to save Jews because they perceived the Jew as 'other'," says Jacques Wallage, Jewish son of Holocaust survivors who is now the current mayor of Groningen, once home to a vibrant Jewish community.

Classic Christian antisemitism was all-pervasive among the devoutly religious Dutch population, and in the wake of economic recession anti-Jewish sentiment reached an all-time high in prewar Netherlands. Many became willing collaborators, betraying Jews who were in hiding, like the Frank family, and actively participating in the destruction of the Jews of the Netherlands. The Dutch were "fully at the disposal of the Nazis, and in some cases, the Germans didn't have to do anything, because the Dutch willingly carried out the deportations," the mayor explains. Others merely "looked the other way, so they didn't have to see anything."

== Production ==
Willy Lindwer, a native of Amsterdam, is the son of Holocaust survivors. He graduated from the Netherlands Film Academy in Amsterdam in 1971. He founded the production company AVA Productions in 1985, which has been dedicated to producing international documentaries that are distributed worldwide that often focus on the Holocaust or Jewish themes.

In Goodbye Holland, Willy Lindwer investigates the story of his parents' survival in hiding, and of the betrayal of an aunt and uncle who were hidden in a Dutch home nearby. In the process, Lindwer meets with Dutch Holocaust survivors, and children of survivors like himself. In addition, he speaks with former members of the Dutch police force that operated under the German Nazi occupation. What emerges is a terrifying tale of collaboration between ordinary Dutch citizens and the regime that led to the annihilation of nearly an entire population.

== Awards ==
Goodbye Holland was nominated for an Israeli Academy Award.

== See also ==
- History of the Jews in the Netherlands

Other documentaries about Jews in World War II:

- A Story about a Bad Dream
- Paradise Camp
- Pola's March
- The Sixth Battalion
- The Boys of Buchenwald
- The Story of Chaim Rumkowski and the Jews of Lodz
