= Ralph James Wickel =

American tennis player (1921–2001)

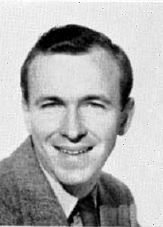
- Wickel in 1947
- Full name: Ralph James Wickel
- Country (sports): United States
- Born: November 28, 1921 Lansdale, Pennsylvania, U.S.
- Died: April 26, 2001 (aged 79) Vero Beach, Florida, U.S.
- College: Temple University

Ralph James Wickel
- Military career
- Allegiance: United States of America
- Branch: U.S. Army
- Service years: 1942–1945
- Rank: Technician Fifth Grade
- Units: 23rd Headquarters Special Troops Ghost Army
- Conflicts: World War II: Rhineland; Central Europe; Ardennes; Northern France

Ralph James Wickel (November 28, 1921 – April 26, 2001) was an American tennis player.

Wickel was born and was raised in the borough of Lansdale, Pennsylvania. The family home was located on N. Towamencin Avenue. The Wickel family were members of the Church of the Holy Trinity, North Broad Street. Wickel was educated in the Lansdale public school system and graduated from Lansdale High School.

Wickel participated in the Lansdale High School marching band. As tennis was not a varsity sport at the school in the late 1930s, Wickel had to develop his skills on local tennis courts. The Pool and Sons Pants Factory, at Second Street and Towamencin Avenue in Lansdale, maintained a tennis court. The factory owner and operator, Irwin H. Pool, took notice of Ralph's tennis ability and mentored his development. Wickel participated in local amateur tennis tournaments and played at various private clubs in the Lansdale area. Wickel garnered the attention of Temple University (Philadelphia) and was awarded a scholarship to participate on the varsity tennis team.

During the time Wickel was attending Temple University, the United States entered World War II. Wickel enlisted in the U.S. Army in October 1942. Mustered into active service in May 1943, Wickel was stationed at Fort George G. Meade, Maryland. Completing basic training and qualifying as an M1 rifle marksman, Ralph's occupational specialty was to be a radio operator with the 3132nd Sonic Company.

The 3132nd Sonic Company was composed of soldiers participating in a classified unit named the 23rd Headquarters Special Troops. Their mission involved tactical deception activities in the European theatre. The 23rd Headquarters Special Troops were composed of the 603rd Engineer Battalion, 406th Combat Engineer, and the 3132nd Sonic Company, better known in history as the Ghost Army. The special troops were composed of artists, designers, actors, meteorologists, sound technicians, and their true mission was not to fight, but to deceive the German army. Their props were inflatable tanks and pyrotechnics; their tools camouflage, "spoof" radio plays, special effects, and sonic deception.

Wickel departed with his company for the European theatre in May 1944. During his service, he was involved in the battles of Northern France, the Ardennes, Central Europe and the Rhineland. The 23rd Headquarters Special Troops military activities were highly classified during the war, and the mission details were only declassified in 1996. Wickel earned the military position of Technician Fifth Grade (T/5). Receiving an honorable discharge from the United States Army, he returned to civilian life in November 1945.

Wickel returned to Temple University to compete on the varsity tennis team and earn a bachelor's degree. Upon graduation, he and his wife, Georgine, continued to reside in the Philadelphia area. Wickel chose a career in education, and the Wickel family expanded with the birth of their daughter, Kathleen.

As a member of the Middle States Lawn Tennis Association, a division of the United States Lawn Tennis Association (USLTA), Wickel competed successfully in amateur regional tennis tournaments. He reached divisional rankings of 9th in singles (1954) and 1st in doubles (1954 & 1955). Wickel competed in the USLTA men's singles United States National Championships, now known as the US Open Tennis Championships. He competed in Round 1 of the tournament in 1952, 1954 and 1955.

Wickel changed careers, joining the Holt, Rinehart and Winston Publishing Co. and working there until his retirement in 1981, at which time he and his wife moved to Vero Beach, Florida. Ralph and Georgine were avid antique automobile collectors and were members of the National Antique Automobile Club and the Indian River County Studebaker Club.

Wickel died on April 26, 2001, in Vero Beach, Florida.

== Military honors and awards ==
Wickel's decorations include

American Campaign Medal	European-African-Middle Eastern Campaign Medal	Army Good Conduct Medal

== United States Lawn Tennis Association – Middle States Lawn Tennis Association ==
Men's Regional Singles Rankings:

1951 – 17th

1952 – 17th

1954 – 9th

1955 – 13th

1956 – 14th

Men's Regional Doubles Rankings:

1952 – 19th (Wills and Wickel)

1954 – 1st (Stern and Wickel)

1955 – 1st (Hoffman and Wickel)

1956 – 6th (Meade and Wickel)

== Tennis career: Major tournaments ==
Men's singles

1952 | 1952-08-29 – US Open

Round 1 – Wood Jr., Sidney Burr d. Wickel, Ralph J. (6–0 6–2 6–4)

1952 | 1952-07-15 – North Philadelphia Tennis Tournament

Quarterfinals – Wickel, Ralph J. d. Hoffman, Harry (6–8 6–3 6–3)

1953 | 0000-00-00 – Pennsylvania Lawn Tennis Championship

Round 1 – Eisenberg, Pablo S. d. Wickel, Ralph J. (6–2 6–0)

1954 | 1954-08-28 – US Open

Round 1 – Stewart, George d. Wickel, Ralph J. (6–3 6–4 6–2)

1954 | 0000-00-00 – North Philadelphia Tennis Tournament

Final – Hoffmann Jr., Harry d. Wickel, Ralph J. (4–6 6–4 7–5 6–4)

1954 | 1954-06-06 – Philadelphia and District Clay Courts

Quarterfinals – Hoffmann Sr., Harry d. Wickel, Ralph J. (6–1 6–3)

1954 | 1954-07-25 – Pennsylvania Lawn Tennis Championship

Round 1 – Wickel, Ralph J. d. Clothier 2nd, William J. (Bill) (6–3 4–6 8–6)

Round 2 – Lesch, John J. d. Wickel, Ralph J. (6–3 7–5)

1955 | 1955-09-02 – US Open

Round 1 – Falkenburg, Robert (Bob) d. Wickel, Ralph J. (8–6 6–1 5–7 6–0 )

1955 | 1955-06-26 – West Jersey Open

Semifinals – Meade Jr., Newton B. d. Wickel, Ralph J. (2–2 ret.)

1955 | 1955-07-24 – Pennsylvania Lawn Tennis Championship

Round 1 – Gaines, Richard (Dick) d. Wickel, Ralph J. (6–1 6–1)

1956 | 1956-06-03 – Water Tower TC Hard Courts

Quarterfinals – Clark, Straight d. Wickel, Ralph J. (?)

1956 | 1956-06-10 – Philadelphia and District Clay Courts

Round 3 – Wickel, Ralph J. d. Clothier 2nd, William J. (Bill) (6–3 6–1)

Quarterfinals – Meade Jr., Newton B. d. Wickel, Ralph J. (6–4 3–6 13–11)

1956 | 1956-07-29 – Pennsylvania Lawn Tennis Championship

Preliminary Round – Schnaars, James d. Wickel, Ralph J. (6–3 6–2)

1957 | 1957-05-12 – Brockway Invitation

Round 2 – Short, Joseph P. (Joey) d. Wickel, Ralph J. (6–1 6–3)

1959 | 1959-06-14 – West Jersey Open

Semifinals – Boyer, Robert (Bob) d. Wickel, Ralph J. (w.o.)

1960 | 1960-05-08 Cheltenham Hardcourts

Round 2 – Wickel, Ralph J. d. Lieberman, Mike (6–4 6–1)

Quarterfinals – Dailey, Edward G. (Ed) d. Wickel, Ralph J. (7–5 6–2)

1960 | 1960-06-19 – Delaware Valley

Quarterfinals – Meade Jr., Newton B. d. Wickel, Ralph J. (6–4 6–4)

== See also ==
- Lansdale, Pennsylvania
- The Ghost Army (2013, Documentary)
