= Who Shall Live and Who Shall Die? =

- Directed by: Laurence Jarvik
- Release date: 1982
- Running time: 90 minutes
- Country: United States
- Language: English

Who Shall Live and Who Shall Die? is a 1982 documentary film that asks whether the United States could have stopped the Holocaust. The film combines previously classified information, rare newsreel footage, and interviews with the politicians who were in office at the time, to tell a behind-the-scenes story of secret motives and inane priorities that allowed for the death of millions. The film title refers to the prayer Unetanneh Tokef that has been a part of the Rosh Hashanah and Yom Kippur liturgy in rabbinical Judaism for centuries.

== Summary ==
At the height of the war, dying Hungarian Jews managed to smuggle a letter to the Allies. It read, "And you, our brothers in all free countries: and you, governments of all free lands, where are you? What are you doing to hinder the carnage that is now going on?".

Through archival footage and soundbites, the documentary simultaneously reconstructs and criticizes America's isolationist attitude during the war. Full of righteous anger, the film scrutinizes Jewish-Americans inactivity and the government's apathetic response to the European Jews' cry for help.

Full of biting anger, Peter Bergson of the Emergency Committee to Save the Jewish People of Europe believes that American Jews silenced their outcries against the Holocaust because they were afraid they wouldn't get into their local Country Clubs. Bergson argues that if American Jewish leadership had taken a more vocal and active stance against the Nazism, lives could have been saved.

But while Bergson blames Jewish leadership, other politicians are more critical of the Franklin D. Roosevelt administration, which seems to have been ill-advised, consumed by other issues and dependent upon the nation's approval. One politician quips that the truth is President Roosevelt didn't want to be remembered for passing the "Jew Deal".

Regardless of Roosevelt's motives, the Commander-in-Chief missed opportunities both at war and at home to save Jewish lives. One of the most devastating decisions was the nation's refusal to change its immigration policies. The tangles of bureaucracy, deep-rooted anti-Semitism, and a fear of the economic effects seem to have caused the inflexibility. One politician recognizes that "it should have been a crisis, but there wasn't enough passion in America to let them in". He's still haunted by a story of a boat full of Jewish refugees who managed to escape from Hamburg, Germany, and traveled to America, only to be refused asylum. They ventured down to Cuba, where they were again refused entrance. Left with no other option - the Jews "returned to Hamburg to burn".

The documentary points to the fact that while the Jews were being slaughtered, America refused to fully recognize the horror, but, as soon as the war was over, the nation was ready to address the inhumanity. Who Shall Live and Who Shall Die? shows clips from a disturbing American propaganda film, Death Mills, which was intended to educate the German people about the crimes of the Nazi regime. Black-and-white footage shows Nazi concentration camps after their liberation. Emaciated bodies, still alive but with no chance of survival, lie motionless on the open fields. When the crematorium door is opened, showing the skulls inside, the narrator demands, "Don't turn away! Look!" Once the evil had been committed and nothing could be done to change the awful reality, the public was ready to be shocked and horrified.

== About the director ==
Laurence A. Jarvik received his Ph.D. and Master of Fine Arts in film and television from UCLA's School of Film and TV and taught at UCLA and California State University, Los Angeles.

Since then, he's been involved in PBS. He wrote two books about the station, Masterpiece Theatre and the Politics of Quality (Scarecrow Press, 1999) and PBS: Behind the Screen (Prima, 1997), and testified before the United States Congress about PBS and cultural policy. He has appeared on C-SPAN's Washington Journal, CNN's Crossfire, ABC's Nightline, and the CBS Evening News, among other programs. His articles have appeared in scholarly and popular publications including The New York Times, The Boston Globe, The Los Angeles Times, American Film, Montage, and American Cinematographer.

James Kurth, Claude Smith Professor of Political Science at Swarthmore College, co-produced this film.

In 2017 he was interviewed in Agustin Blazquez's documentary film THE TRUMP EFFECT: Deprogramming the American Mind.

== Reception ==
Who Shall Live and Who Shall Die? was the first documentary to examine America's roles during the Holocaust. The documentary received positive reviews from major publications. The Los Angeles Times called it, "a devastating political story," and the New York Times said the, "unadorned" film tells a story not to be proud of.

== See also ==
- President Franklin D. Roosevelt
- antisemitism

Other documentaries about the Holocaust:

- Paradise Camp
- The Boys of Buchenwald
- The Story of Chaim Rumkowski and the Jews of Lodz
- The Sixth Battalion
- Sisters in Resistance
