= Sisters in Resistance =

- Jacqueline Pery and Geneviève de Gaulle
- Directed by: Maia Wechsler
- Narrated by: Kate Mulgrew
- Release date: 2002
- Running time: 60 minutes
- Country: USA
- Language: French

Sisters in Resistance (Soeurs en Résistance) is a television documentary directed by Maia Wechsler initially released in France on October 25, 2002 and later premiered on PBS in the United States on April 29, 2003. It centers four young French women who fought against the German occupation of France during World War II who tell their stories of arrest and deportation to Ravensbrück concentration camp. The film is narrated by Kate Mulgrew, and stars Geneviève de Gaulle Anthonioz, Jacqueline Péry d'Alincourt, Germaine Tillion, and Anise Postel-Vinay as themselves.

== Summary ==
When Germany invades France in May 1940, a small group of young French women in their early twenties, Jacqueline Pery, Anise Postel-Vinay, Germaine Tillion, and Geneviève de Gaulle-Anthonioz, accept assignments in the French Resistance. They transport secret military correspondence, make protest flyers, tear down Nazi flags, and hide Jews from the Nazis.

All four are arrested, imprisoned, tortured, and sent to Ravensbrück concentration camp. All four survive. Jacqueline moves to America and lectures about her experiences, Germaine denounces the French military's use of torture in the Algerian War, Anise documents the use of poison gas in the Ravensbrück concentration camp, and Geneviève leads an international movement to help the poor.

== Production ==
The film was produced by the Red Triangle Productions.

== Reception ==
The film won Outstanding Documentary from the Academy Award Screening Committee and Best Documentary at the Women in Cinema Film Festival.

== See also ==
- Resistance movement
- Resistance during World War II
- French resistance
- Pola's March
- Marion's Triumph
- The Boys of Buchenwald
- A Story about a Bad Dream
