= Nurit Kedar =

Israeli film director

Nurit Kedar (Hebrew: נורית קידר) is an Israeli producer and director of documentary films. Known for her work exploring conflict and war, she has produced notable series for channel 2 Commercial channel broadcasting . and directed award-winning documentaries such as One Shot and Life Sentences. Over a career spanning four decades, Kedar has received recognition from the Israeli Academy of Film and Television and various international film festivals.

== Career ==
During the 1980s, Kedar worked in the news department of Israel's Channel 1 in Washington. At the beginning of the 1990s, she returned to Israel, where she worked for CNN In 1994 she served as a senior producer for channel 2 - the commercial channel known "Keshet" broadcasting. Today channel 12. She produced the documentary series The Fat Man with the Sony, starring Yaron London. Together with London, she also produced the series The Poetics of the Masses, Buddha Pizza Krishna Cola, and Mr Prime Minister. Kedar also produced the film Istiklal, directed by Nizar Hassan, which won the Wolgin award for best Israeli documentary at the 1994 Jerusalem Film Festival.https://jff.org.il/en/article/6195

== Filmmaking style and themes ==
Kedar's work frequently explores themes of conflict and war. In a 2008 interview, she described her filmmaking as a critical examination of society, noting that her films often present difficult subject matter that can be challenging for viewers.

== Notable films and awards ==
producer of the documentary film Istiklal by Nizar Hassan won Wolgin Award - Best Israeli Documentary https://jff.org.il/en/article/6195 Kedar's film Asesino, on the disappearance and presumed murder of thousands of young Jews during the Dirty War following the 1976 Argentine coup d'état, won the Noga Award at the 2001 Jerusalem Film Festival. Her film One Shot, which included "unprecedented" interviews with Israeli snipers, received the 2004 Cologne Conference Phoenix Award. Hanuszka is a 2006 film by Kedar that tells the true story of a Jewish girl who survived the Holocaust.

In 2011, Kedar's film Concrete was broadcast on Britain's Channel 4, featuring Israeli soldiers discussing the 2008–09 attack on Gaza. Following the broadcast, Kedar reported receiving death threats and accusations of being a traitor.

Kedar and Yaron Shani won the Van Leer Group Foundation Award for Best Documentary Film, for the film Life Sentences at the 2013 Jerusalem Film Festival. The film also won the Objectif d'or and the Audience Award at the Millennium Film Festival.

In 2015, Kedar was awarded a Lifetime Achievement Award by the Israeli Academy of Film and Television, and in 2016 she received "The Art Of Cinema Award" from the Israeli Ministry of Culture. Her 2019 film Lieber-man was nominated for best documentary at the Jerusalem Film Festival. In 2021, her film #Schoolyard won a Special Mention at the Jerusalem Film Festival. In 2022 PriMed Mediterranean Festival won First Award.

== Filmography ==
- Isitiklal

*Borders   1999

https://letterboxd.com/film/borders-1999-1/watch https://www.unaff.org/1999/Fborders.htm

- Lebanon Dream 2001

https://www.moderntimes.review/nurit-kedar-looking-for-the-hard-way Lebanon Dream 2001

- Asesino 2002

https://letterboxd.com/film/asesino/watch

- One Shot (2004)

- Hanuszka (2006)
- Concrete (2011)
- LIFE SENTENCES 2013
- https://israelfilmcenterstream.org/film/life-sentences

*https://www.dokfest-muenchen.de/films/life-sentences?lang=en

- Lieberman 2019

https://jff.org.il/en/movie/33046

- #Schoolyard (2021)
- https://jff.org.il/en/article/49275
- https://www.filmplatform.net/product/schoolyard

"I Cried in Gaza", (2025) Broadcast Kan 11 - 16.4.2026. Solidarity Film Festival (2025) Other Israel Film Festival NYC (December 2025)

- https://otherisrael.eventive.org/schedule/68d54f4b8806111d43bb3d98
