= James Kurth =

American geopolitician

James Kurth (born 1938) is the Claude C. Smith Professor Emeritus of Political Science at Swarthmore College, where he taught defense policy, foreign policy, and international politics. In 2004, Kurth also became the editor of Orbis, a professional journal on international relations and U.S. foreign policy published by the Foreign Policy Research Institute (FPRI) in Philadelphia, Pennsylvania.

Kurth received his BA in history from Stanford University and his MA and PhD in political science from Harvard University, where he was mentored by Samuel P. Huntington. Kurth taught at Harvard from 1967 to 1973 and has taught at Swarthmore since 1973. He hasbeen a visiting member of the Institute for Advanced Study in Princeton, New Jersey; visiting professor of political science at the University of California at San Diego; and visiting professor of strategy at the U.S. Naval War College. At the war college, Kurth was chairman of the Strategy and Campaign Department, an advisor to the Chief of Naval Operations Strategic Studies Group, and the recipient of the Department of the Navy Medal for Meritorious Civilian Service. Kurth is a decorated veteran, having served in the Navy in the 1960s on the USS Saint Paul (CA-73), the flagship of the United States Seventh Fleet where he was a deck and gunnery officer.

He is the author of nearly a hundred articles and the editor of two books. Kurth frequently publishes in The National Interest, The American Interest, National Review, The American Conservative, Orbis, Foreign Policy and Current History. He has given testimony before committees of the United States Congress on four occasions. His best-known article is "The Real Clash," published in 1994 in The National Interest, which asserts that the primary threat to the United States is not a clash with other civilizations, but an ideological and cultural clash within American society "between the multiculturalists and the defenders of Western civilization and the American Creed." Kurth is also a critic of immigration and feminism (he has denounced feminism as a key factor behind what he calls the "decay of Western civilization" and, in particular, American hegemony), and "suggests that it is perhaps only the influence of the Catholic Church that might curb the excesses of modern liberalism".

His book, "The American Way of Empire: How America Won a World--But Lost Her Way" was published in December, 2019 by Washington Books.

Kurth has served in numerous think tanks, including the Council of Foreign Relations, Coalition for a Realistic Foreign Policy, and The Center of Study of America and the West at FPRI.

Kurth is an evangelical Protestant as well as a traditional social and political conservative; he is an elder at Proclamation Presbyterian Church in Bryn Mawr, Pennsylvania. He objected to Operation Iraqi Freedom and the broader U.S. push to promote liberal democracy in the Middle East; instead, in "Splitting Islam," Kurth recommends that the U.S. utilize the division between Sunni and Shi'ites to distract radical Islamists from attacking America and the West.

Kurth is a Swarthmore enthusiast. One of few conservative faculty members at Swarthmore, he is known for his provocative courses and formerly, he was also known for the popular opening day lecture of his international politics course.

== Essays ==
- The Real Clash, The National Interest, 1994
- American Strategy in the Global Era, Naval War College Review, 2000
- The Protestant Deformation and American Foreign Policy, The Philadelphia Society, 2001
- The Next NATO, The National Interest, 2001
- The Late American Nation, The National Interest, 2004
- Global Threats and American Strategies: From Communism in 1955 to Islamism in 2005, Orbis, 2005
- The Neoconservatives Are History, Orbis, 2006
- The U.S. Victory in Vietnam: Lost and Found, Intercollegiate Studies Institute, 2006
- Samuel Huntington: Ideas Have Consequences, Foreign Policy Research Institute, 2009

== See also ==
- Who Shall Live and Who Shall Die? DVD, producer, 1982 DVD, producer, 1982
