= Fields of Sacrifice =

- Directed by: Donald Brittain
- Written by: Donald Brittain
- Produced by: Donald Brittain
- Narrated by: Douglas Rain
- Cinematography: Eugene Boyko
- Edited by: Rex Tasker
- Music by: Eldon Rathburn
- Distributed by: National Film Board of Canada
- Release date: 1964
- Running time: 38 minutes 13 seconds
- Country: Canada
- Language: English

Fields of Sacrifice is a 1964 documentary by Donald Brittain about Canadian war dead. The film visits former battlefields where over 100,000 Canadian soldiers lost their lives in World War I and World War II and examines Canadian military cemeteries and memorials from Hong Kong to Sicily.

== Production ==
Fields of Sacrifice was produced by the National Film Board of Canada (NFB) for the Canadian Department of Veteran Affairs. The film was originally intended to be a straightforward look at Canadian military cemeteries. Brittain, a staff filmmaker who had just completed the 13-part Canada at War series, decided on different approach. He combined stock footage with glimpses of the former battlegrounds a generation later and added his own commentary. Brittain shows that while these former battlefields are now peaceful and people are getting on with their lives, the sacrifices of Canadians are not forgotten. The film was narrated by Douglas Rain and shot in 35 mm.

== Theatrical release ==
Fields of Sacrifice premiered in Ottawa in October 1963, attended by Governor General of Canada Georges Vanier. It would enjoy a two-year theatrical run, often shown as part of a double bill with the NFB's 70-minute drama Drylanders. It was broadcast on CBC-TV in 1965 on Remembrance Day.

== Significance ==
Fields of Sacrifice is considered Brittain's first major film as director. It received an Order of Merit at the Canadian Film Awards.
