= Orbis (journal) =

- Discipline: International relations
- Language: English
- Edited by: Mackubin Thomas Owens

Publication details
- History: 1957–present
- Publisher: Elsevier on behalf of the Foreign Policy Research Institute (United States)
- Frequency: Quarterly

Standard abbreviations
- ISO 4: Orbis

Indexing
- ISSN: 0030-4387 (print); 1873-5282 (web)
- LCCN: 58004080
- OCLC no.: 01761361

Links
- Journal homepage; Journal page at Elsevier website; Online access

Orbis is the Foreign Policy Research Institute's (FPRI) quarterly journal of world affairs. Published by Elsevier on behalf of the FPRI, an American think tank, it was founded in 1957 by Robert Strausz-Hupé as a forum for policymakers, scholars, and the public who sought debate that they believed was not found in the journals of that time.

Over 60 years later, Orbis publishes articles on topics relating to American foreign policy and national security and analysis of international developments. The journal is edited by Nikolas Gvosdev (Naval War College). Other recent editors include James Kurth (Swarthmore College, 2005–2007), David Eisenhower (University of Pennsylvania, 2001–2004), and Walter A. McDougall (University of Pennsylvania, 1995–2001).
