= Helga Hošková-Weissová =

Czech artist and Holocaust survivor (b. 1929)

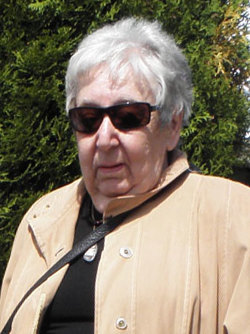
- Born: 10 November 1929 (age 96); Prague, Czechoslovakia
- Education: Prague, Czech Republic
- Alma mater: Academy of Fine Arts, Prague
- Known for: Drawing, Painting, Writing,
- Notable work: Pictures from Wandering Through the Holy Land
- Awards: Medal of Merit, Josef Hlávka medal

Helga Hošková-Weissová, also Helga Weiss, (born 10 November 1929) is a Czech artist, and a Holocaust survivor. She is known for her drawings that depict life at Terezín and her diary, which was published in 2013.

== Biography ==
Helga Hošková-Weissová was born on 10 November 1929 in Prague-Libeň to an assimilated Jewish family. Her mother, Irena Fuchsova, was a seamstress and her father, Otto Weiss, worked at the state bank in Prague. She was raised in Prague, and shortly after her twelfth birthday on 10 December 1941, she and her parents were deported to the Terezín ghetto. Although they were separated in the camp, it was somewhat possible to see each other and exchange clandestine notes. It is estimated that 15,000 children (younger than 16) were deported to Terezín. Fewer than 100 of the Terezín children deported to Auschwitz survived.

=== Life at Terezín ===
Using her gift for painting and drawing, while at Terezín, Helga wrote a diary that included images from her life in the camp, which survived the war. Her father said to her in December 1941, "draw what you see," she did exactly that. She was held captive in what was called the Girl's Home in room twenty four.

Her drawings of what everyday life was like for Jews in Terezín were shown and discussed in the 1998 documentary film Voices of the Children, for which she was interviewed.

=== Deportation to Auschwitz ===
In October 1944 at the age of 15, she and her mother were deported to Auschwitz. Whenever new victims arrived, they were sorted. The ones sent to the left went straight to the gas chambers to die, and the ones sent to the right to complete forced labor until death. The person sorting that day may have been the infamous Josef Mengele. Helga convinced him she was old enough to work by claiming she was 18 and was told to go to the right. She also successfully claimed that her mother was younger than she was which saved her mother's life. After ten days, she was transferred from Auschwitz to Freiberg near Dresden, an auxiliary camp of Flossenbürg labor camp where she escaped death. She was then forced to join a 16-day death march to the camp at Mauthausen. She remained there until the camp's liberation on 5 May 1945 by the US Army.

=== Post-war life ===
After World War II ended, Helga went back to Prague and studied at the Academy of Fine Arts. She also studied under the Czech artist Emil Filla from 1950. She worked as an artist and raised a family. After the Velvet Revolution in November 1989, she exhibited her art many times both in Prague and in other places in Europe.

In 2009, she was interviewed by a nonprofit, Post Bellum, for their Stories of the 20th Century Project. As of February 2013, at the age of 83, Helga still lives in the flat she was born in and the same flat from which she was deported from in 1941.

== Awards and honors ==
In 1993, she was awarded an honorary Doctorate by the Massachusetts College of Art and Design in Boston for her lifetime achievements. In 2009, she was also awarded the Josef Hlávka medal. In October 2009, Vaclav Klaus presented her with the Medal of Merit.

== Publications ==
Her account of her experiences before and during the Holocaust, Helga's Diary: A Young Girl's Account of Life in a Concentration Camp (ISBN 9780393348248), was published by W. W. Norton & Company on 22 April 2013.
