= Drylanders =

1963 film by Don Haldane

- Drylanders Movie Poster
- Directed by: Don Haldane
- Written by: M. Charles Cohen
- Produced by: Peter Jones
- Starring: Frances Hyland; James B. Douglas
- Narrated by: William Weintraub
- Cinematography: Reginald H. Morris
- Edited by: Kirk Jones; John Kemeny
- Music by: Eldon Rathburn
- Color process: Black and white
- Production company: National Film Board of Canada
- Distributed by: National Film Board of Canada
- Release date: 1963
- Running time: 70 Minutes
- Country: Canada
- Language: English
- Budget: $211,479
- Box office: $200,000

Drylanders is a 1963 Canadian Western film directed by Don Haldane and Written by M. Charles Cohen and starring Frances Hyland and James B. Douglas. It was the National Film Board of Canada's first English-language feature film and its earliest entry outside of the documentary format.

== Plot ==
Set in 1900s Western Canada, Daniel Greer (James Douglas) returns home after the Boer War to find city life not to his liking. Instead, he opts for the life of a wheat farmer. At first, his farm is prosperous, but he becomes victim to a nationwide drought. He struggles to keep his farm afloat, but dies before he could see the end of the drought. His wife (Frances Hyland) continues her husband's work on the farm.

== Cast ==
- Frances Hyland as Liza
- James B. Douglas as Dan (as James Douglas)
- Lester Nixon as Bob MacPherson
- Mary Savidge as Ada MacPherson (as Mary Savage)
- William Fruet as Colin (as William Fruete)
- Don Francks as Russel
- Iréna Mayeska as Thora (as Irena Mayeska)
- Ernest Huber as Man in boxcar

== Production ==
Charles Cohen was sent to Saskatchewan by the National Film Board of Canada in the 1950s about the possibility of making a film about farming and irrigation. He proposed three half-hour television documentaries, but the Canadian Broadcasting Corporation rejected it. The NFB proposed a one-hour documentary, but the CBC rejected it again. Don Haldane was selected to direct and he suggested making it a fictional film. Cohen rewrote the film.

The film was shot in widescreen 35mm. It was shot in black and white and used SuperScope, the first time it was used by the NFB, to reduce costs. Stage actors with limited television work were hired and smaller roles were played by locals. Filming started in Swift Current in summer 1961, and the blizzard scene was filmed in at a NFB studio in Montreal in winter 1962. It cost $211,479, twice the planned amount, to make the film.

Drylanders was a fictionalized documentary similar to earlier French-language productions from the NFB's Panoramique series and dramas in the English-language Perspective series. Heavily promoted during its release, the film was modestly successful at the box office.

== Release ==
Columbia Pictures distributed the film and it premiered in Swift Current, on 25 September 1963. The French dub of the film, Un autre pays, premiered in Quebec City on 20 November. Fields of Sacrifice served as part of a double feature due to Drylanders short runtime.

It was shown in over 500 theatres and earned $200,000 during its theatrical release in Canada. The film was also theatrically released in the United Kingdom, United States, Central America, and South America. It was shown on television in China, Malaysia, Switzerland, Yugoslavia, and other countries.

It played theatrically throughout 1963 and 1964 before making its way to the non-theatrical circuit, where it was shown in schools and community centres on 16 mm. It later enjoyed a second career on television and home video.

== Works cited ==
- Evans, Gary (1991). In the National Interest: A Chronicle of the National Film Board of Canada from 1949 to 1989. University of Toronto Press. ISBN 0802027849.
