= We Lived for Estonia =

1997 film directed by Andres Sööt

We Lived for Estonia Estonian: Elasime Eestile
- Directed by: Andres Sööt
- Written by: Andres Sööt
- Starring: Alfred Käärmann
- Music by: Sven Grünberg
- Distributed by: MONOfilm (:et)
- Release date: 1997
- Running time: 41 minutes
- Country: Estonia
- Language: Estonian

We Lived for Estonia (Estonian: Elasime Eestile) is a documentary film about the Forest brothers during World War II.

== Plot ==
During June 1941, Nazi forces occupied Estonia. By 1944, when the Soviet-Nazi frontline was drawing towards the Estonian border from the East, Alfred Käärmann was conscripted into the German military. By September 1944 the Red Army had again occupied Estonia. Alfred was forced to make a decision: whether to stay in Estonia or retreat with the Germans. He chose the former, However he risked arrest and deportation by the Soviets. In order to survive, he, like many other Estonian men, took refuge in the forests. They were known as the Forest brothers. Alfred Käärmann discusses his experience with the Forest brothers.
