= Homo Sapiens 1900 =

1998 Swedish documentary film

- Directed by: Peter Cohen
- Release date: 30 October 1998
- Running time: 88 minutes
- Country: Sweden
- Language: English

Homo Sapiens 1900 is a 1998 Swedish documentary film directed by Peter Cohen, about various eugenics methods that were in practice in Europe during the first part of the 20th century.

== Synopsis ==
Eugenics is to be the scientific credo of the 20th century. The man credited with its invention, Francis Galton, says it is based on the concept that the evolution of man is crippled by the ill-conceived - those unfit to breed. The study of eugenics thus would concern itself with distinguishing the weed from the good flowers.

Eugenics offers two approaches: positive eugenics, and negative eugenics. Positive eugenics aims towards creating better humans by careful mating, based on one's genetic makeup. Negative eugenics, on the other hand, seeks to prevent those deemed inferior from reproducing, and thus not impeding man's evolution.

=== In the United States ===
The documentary begins with a clipping of a 1916 American movie that trumpets the creed of eugenics. In The Black Stork, the lead character, physician Harry Haiselden playing himself, refuses to give a newborn, mildly deformed baby a life-saving operation (or, instead, makes the operation fatal). 'There are times when saving a life is a greater crime than taking one', he proclaims. It soon transpires that The Black Stork's climactic scene was, far from being merely fiction, actually a re-enactment of one of Dr. Haiselden's real-life cases, where he let a baby die because he considered the deformed baby to be a burden on society.

Charles Davenport is credited with being the founder of the eugenics movement in the United States. He founds the Eugenics Record Office on Long Island, the purpose being to create a nationwide eugenics register. He trains field workers to visit poor houses, prisons and mental institutions to document, and eventually eliminate through negative eugenics, inferior hereditary characteristics. To justify an aggressive campaign against blacks and immigrants, the eugenics movement used the concept of racial degeneration.

The world's first compulsory sterilization laws are passed in 1907. Shortly thereafter, over 20 states pass similar laws. Tens of thousands are sterilized in the process.

=== In Sweden ===
During the 1920s and 1930s, Sweden becomes a progressive welfare state, and within that period, the doctrine of racial hygiene is gradually implemented in the state's policy. In 1922, the world's first government institute on race biology, The Institute of Race Biology, is established. In 1934, parliament passes non-compulsory sterilization laws similar to that of the United States and Nazi-Germany. Unlike the two aforementioned countries, where sterilization was compulsory, in Sweden a 'democratic approach' is pursued, under the motto of 'opposition shall be overcome through persuasion'.

The German and Swedish implementation of eugenics was bound by a common thread: a profound pride in their Nordic bloodline, and their belief that other ethnic groups were inherently inferior, and those groups should be prevented from interbreeding with the superior one. Hence, negative eugenics was the only logical outcome of Sweden's adoption of eugenics. In pursuit of establishing both positive and negative heritage, a comprehensive study was done on the Swedish population. Towns, parishes, prisons and correctional institutions were visited, and photographs and physical measurements of each person taken.

=== In the Soviet Union ===
The development of racial hygiene and eugenics was beset by problems from the very onset in the Soviet Union. The reason was that Mendel's theory on heredity was ideologically incompatible with the Soviet state, where human beings were regarded as being completely malleable through social engineering and education.

After Lenin's death in 1924, German neurologist Oskar Vogt was requested to study Lenin's brain. He established the Brain Research Institute in Moscow. One of its tasks was to collect all the brains of deceased, highly talented/intellectual Soviet individuals, with Lenin as its first specimen. By safeguarding the brains of the best and brightest for research purposes, these scientists hoped to map out and gain a full understanding of the brain.

=== In Germany/Nazi Germany ===
Germany's first institute of race biology, the Kaiser Wilhelm Institute for Anthropology, Human Heredity and Eugenics, opens in 1927 in Berlin. The Institute's chairman, Eugen Fischer, says its task is to 'investigate the connection between heredity, environment and crossbreeding, and to promote social measures which benefit racially sound individuals'. Though genetics research is gradually beginning to challenge some of the claims made by racial hygiene theories, the Kaiser Wilhelm Institute reduces 'genetics' to just another 'auxiliary science' subordinate to eugenics. With the passing of forced sterilization laws, thousands of Germans with various disabilities are sterilized. Eventually, this is followed by extermination.
