= Iréna Mayeska =

Canadian actress

- Born: Iréna Mloszewska; June 30, 1934; Wilno, Poland
- Education: Queen's University at Kingston
- Occupation: Actress
- Spouse: Leslie Lawton (1982-1986)

Iréna Mayeska (June 30, 1934 – 2009) was a Polish-born Canadian actress.

== Biography ==
Mayeska was born on June 30, 1934, and educated at Ontario's Queen's University at Kingston. She studied with the Canadian Theatre School in Toronto and since then has appeared in many stage and television productions. She was a member of the Stratford Festival company in 1955, and has worked in England and Canada. Irena began her acting career under her real name, since mid-1950s she began to use the stage name Iréna Mayeska.

== Personal life ==
She was married to actor Leslie Lawton.

== Partial filmography ==
- 1963 Drylanders as Thora
- 1963 The Incredible Journey as Mrs. Nurmi
- 1964 Joey (short)
- 1976 Partners as Aunt Margot
- 1978 Drága kisfiam! as Maude Chalmers
- 1980 The Courage of Kavik the Wolf Dog as Edna Hunter
- 1981 Just Jessie as Mrs. Brown
- 1981 The Amateur as Woman Clerk
