= The Saved =

1998 Dutch documentary film

- Directed by: Paul Cohen; Oeke Hoogendijk
- Produced by: Eddy Wijngaarde
- Cinematography: Paul Cohen
- Edited by: Hans van Dongen
- Production companies: Oduesseia Films; NPS
- Distributed by: NFM Distributie
- Release date: 20 May 1998
- Country: Netherlands
- Language: Dutch

The Saved (Dutch: Een Gelukkige Tijd) is a Dutch documentary released in 1998. It was directed by Paul Cohen and Oeke Hoogendijk.

== Plot summary ==
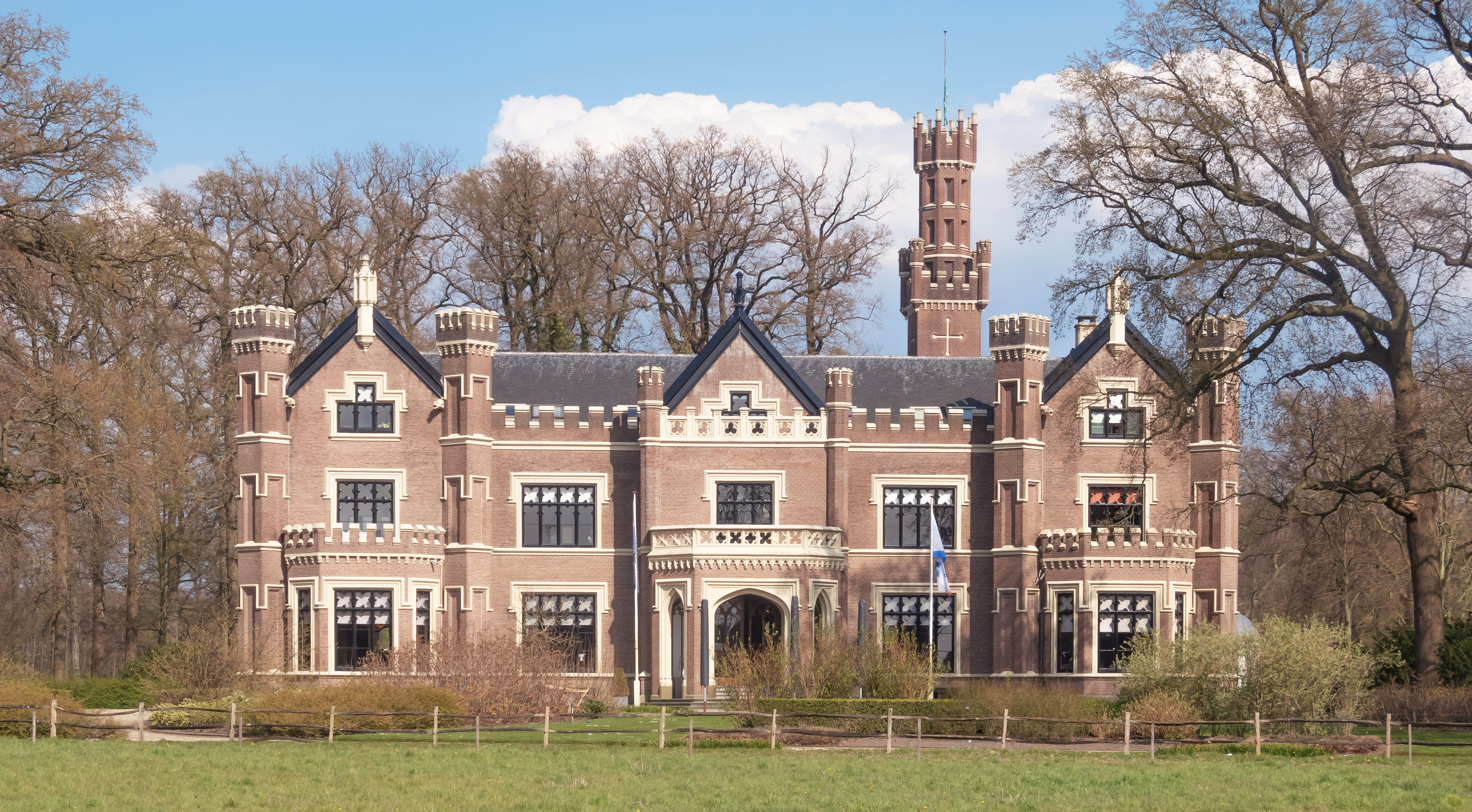
Barneveld Castle, 2020

The Saved portrays the true story of about 600 Jews from the Netherlands and uncovers the shame that haunts them decades after their experience. This group of individuals was specially selected to live through the Holocaust since they were regarded as beneficial to their nation. Conversely, almost a hundred thousand Jews living in the Netherlands were expelled from the country and murdered by the Nazis. After a high-ranking The Hague bureaucrat chose to intercede in order to assist a confidant, he was able to obtain a pact of sorts, which assured the safety of a pair of notable Jews and their households. When news of the deal became public, the Jewish population throughout the Netherlands wrote letters urging to be added to the exclusion list. It was ultimately expanded to include hundreds of Jews. The group included renowned educators, artists, doctors and scientists. They came to be identified as the Barneveld group.

Sent off to Camp Barneveld, comprising a castle named De Schaffelaar and a villa with barracks called De Biezen, the Barneveld Jews formed a mini-city shaped after the world of high culture and refinement, which they were accustomed to at home. While the terror of the Holocaust devastated a majority of the European Jewish population, the Barneveld residents existed in comparative ease. Inhabitants carried with them, home furnishings and porcelain dishware, a school was established and musical performances took place. As opposed to individuals held captive at death camps, the Barnevelders could spend time grooming themselves. A survivor remembers that the women constantly had their hair fashioned in the latest styles and the men never went a day without shaving. Love developed in the Barneveld community due to the close proximity of men and women. A couple met, became engaged and today have four adult children, their lifelong journey together started at the Barneveld home.

As the castle’s population began to rise, the large home became more and more crowded. Some residents compared the situation to being in a large jail cell, with no bars. Soon after food was given out in rations and to make the most out of sleeping quarters, the men and women were divided into barracks styled housing. As time progressed communication with life beyond the castle was severely limited. Collectively, the unit fought to preserve an impression of individual pride and an air of ordinariness. Coping within the castle was difficult for a former resident, because everything that belonged to them was taken away; so it was challenging to show your uniqueness.

In September 1943, the Barneveld clique was relocated to Westerbork, a Nazi labor camp located in Netherlands. The jolt was tremendous, from living in a mansion to residing in camp quarters. They were compelled by the Germans to take part in the expulsion of their neighbors at the camp. The Barnevelder group observed relatives and acquaintances being transferred form Westerbork to Auschwitz. However, the Barnevelders continued to be untouched. While the environment they lived in constantly worsened, the protection of their lives continued. Ultimately, the Barnevelders were moved to Theresienstadt, where they were forced to witness the death of relatives and friends members, yet their own destinies were secure.

Virtually every Barnevelder came out of World War II physically intact. Nevertheless the emotional pain lingers, and for many, the feeling of sorrow due to living through the war is even still now hard to conquer. At every point the chosen group was rescued from murder, although some see their continued existence as a blessing and a burden. The discussion of this past situation is one that leads to uproar, by the very people who lived through this experience. At the beginning of the documentary a Barnevelder expresses their displeasure about the creation of the film. This member believes more focus is due on the Dutch Jews that were killed, whose number total 100,000. Not on the extremely small minority that managed to survive throughout the war.

== See also ==
- List of Holocaust films
