= Peter Cohen (director) =

Swedish film director

- Born: 23 March 1946 (age 80); Sweden
- Occupation: Film director

Peter Cohen (born 23 March 1946) is a Swedish film director, writer, editor and producer. His works include the documentaries The Story of Chaim Rumkowski and the Jews of Lodz (1982), The Architecture of Doom (1989) and Homo Sapiens 1900 (1998).
