= Ghost Army =

United States Army unit

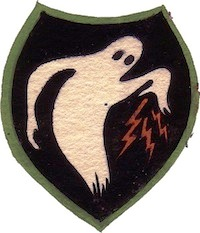
Ghost Army insignia, not used by the actual unit, but associated with the unit after the war

The Ghost Army was a United States Army tactical deception unit during World War II officially known as the 23rd Headquarters Special Troops. The 1,100-man unit was created to deceive the Axis forces and mislead them as to the size and location of Allied forces, while giving the actual units elsewhere time to maneuver. Activated on 20 January 1944, the Ghost Army arrived in Europe in May shortly before D-Day and returned to the US at the end of the war in July 1945. During their tenure, the Ghost Army carried out more than 20 deception campaigns, putting on a "traveling road show" using inflatable tanks, sound trucks, fake radio transmissions, scripts and pretense.

Their story was kept a secret for more than 50 years after the war, until it was declassified in 1996. The unit was the subject of a PBS documentary The Ghost Army in 2013. In February 2022, members of the Ghost Army were awarded the Congressional Gold Medal for their service.

== History and deployment ==
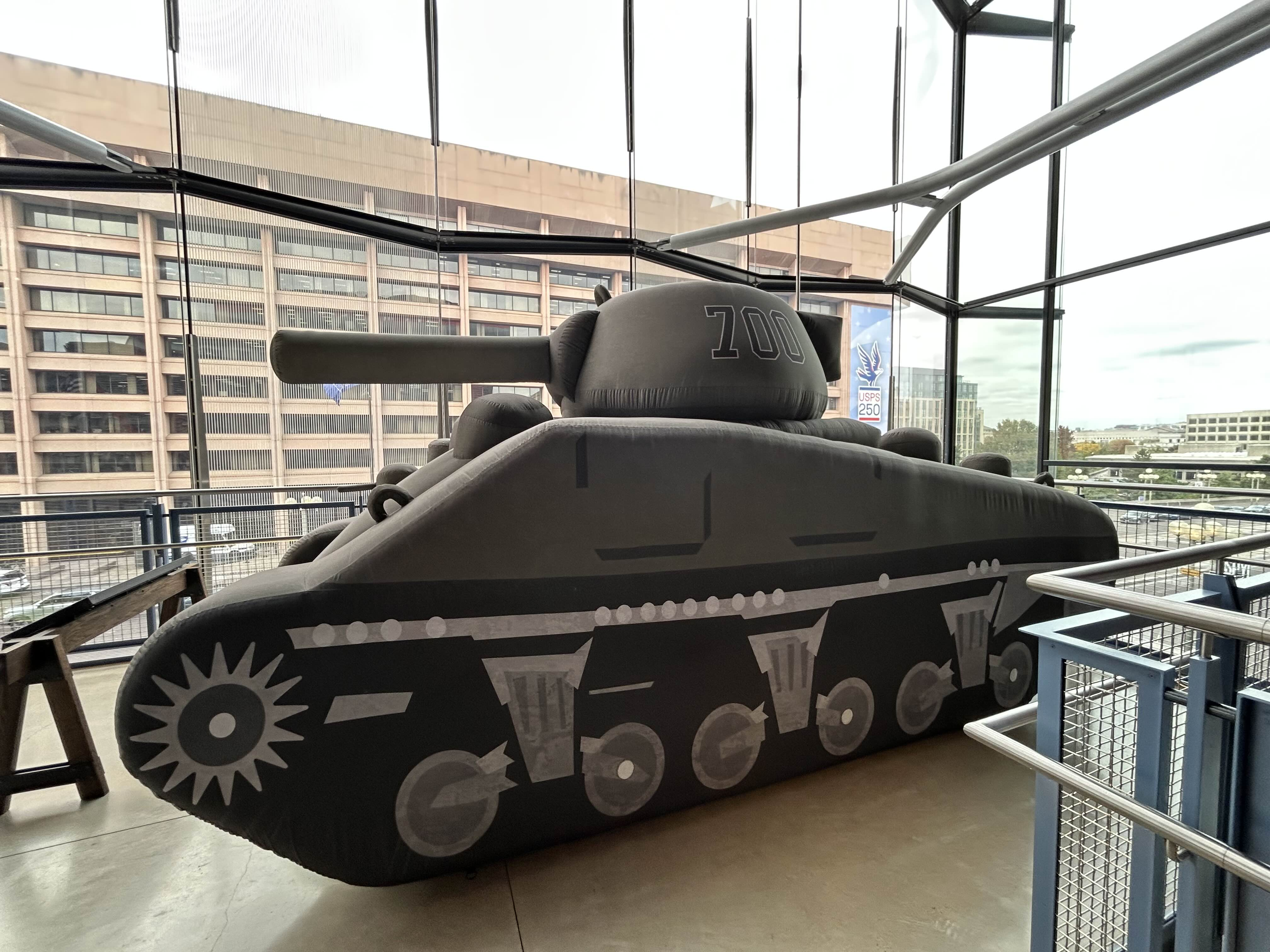
A replica of a Ghost Army dummy tank at the International Spy Museum

The Ghost Army was created by U.S. Army planners Ralph Ingersoll and Billy Harris, and led by Colonel Harry L. Reeder. Inspiration for the unit came from the British units who had honed the deception technique for Operation Bertram during the battle of El Alamein in late 1942.

The unit had its barracks at Camp Forrest, Tennessee, and was fully formed at Camp Pine, New York (now Fort Drum), before sailing for the United Kingdom in early May 1944. In Britain they were based near Stratford-upon-Avon, and troops participated in Operation Fortitude, the British-designed and led D-Day deceptions of a landing force designated for the Pas-de-Calais.

Some troops went to Normandy two weeks after D-Day, where they simulated a Mulberry harbour at night with lights intended to draw German artillery from the real ones. After this the entire unit assisted in tying up the German defenders of Brest by simulating a larger force than was actually encircling them.

As the Allied armies moved east, so did the 23rd, and it eventually was based within Luxembourg, from where it engaged in deceptions of crossings of the Ruhr river, positions along the Maginot Line, Hürtgen Forest, and finally a major crossing of the Rhine to draw German troops away from the actual sites. Ghost soldiers were encouraged to use creative solutions to mislead the German Army. Many were recruited from art schools, advertising agencies and other occupations that involved creative thinking. In civilian life, ghost soldiers had been artists, architects, actors, set designers, engineers and lawyers.

The 406th Combat Engineers handled security. The officers were Captain George Rebh (commander), Lt. William George Aliapoulos (3rd Platoon), Lt. George Daley (1st Platoon), Lt. Ted Kelker (HQ Platoon) and Lt. Thomas Robinson (2nd Platoon). Captain Rebh trained his men in infantry tactics.

== Tactics ==
The visual deception arm of the Ghost Army was the 603rd Camouflage Engineers. It was equipped with inflatable tanks, cannons, jeeps, trucks, and airplanes that the men would inflate with air compressors and then camouflage imperfectly so that enemy aerial reconnaissance could see them. They could create dummy airfields, troop bivouacs (complete with fake laundry hanging on clotheslines), motor pools, artillery batteries, and tank formations in a few hours. Many of the men in this unit were artists, recruited from New York and Philadelphia art schools. Their unit became an incubator for young artists who sketched and painted their way through Europe. Several of these soldier-artists went on to have a major impact on art in the postwar US. Bill Blass, Ellsworth Kelly, wildlife artist Arthur Singer, and Art Kane were among the many artists who served in the 603rd.

The 3132 Signal Service Company Special handled sonic deception. Aided by engineers from Bell Labs, a team from the 3132 went to Fort Knox to record sounds of armored and infantry units onto a series of sound effects records that they brought to Europe. For each deception, sounds could be "mixed" to match the scenario they wanted the enemy to believe. This program was recorded on state-of-the-art wire recorders (the predecessor to the tape recorder), and then played back with powerful amplifiers and speakers mounted on halftracks. These sounds were audible 15 miles (24 km) away.

== Legacy ==
No active Army unit traces formal lineage from the 23rd. Both the psychological and Information Operations (IO) communities use the ghost patch as an informal identity as these disciplines specialize in influence Psychological Operations (PO) and deception activities (IO), which the 23rd pioneered. The 23rd Headquarters Special Troops were made Honorary Members of the U.S. Army Psychological Operations Regiment on 3 November 2022.

On Tuesday, 1 February 2022, U.S. president Joe Biden signed into law S. 1404, the Ghost Army Congressional Gold Medal Act, which provides for the award of a Congressional Gold Medal to the Ghost Army, in recognition of their service in conducting deception operations in Europe during World War II.

== See also ==
- 4th Psychological Operations Group
- 56th Theater Information Operations Group
- Operation Bodyguard
- Military dummy
- First United States Army Group
- Operation Bertram
- List of Congressional Gold Medal Recipients
