= David Porteous =

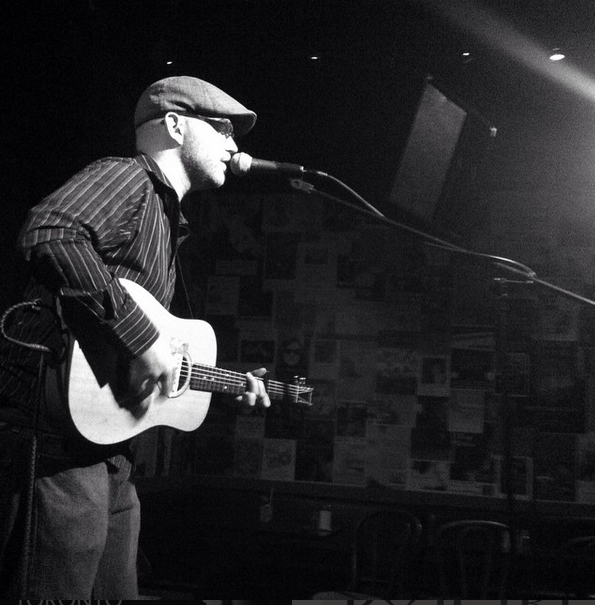
- Porteous performing in 2015

Background information
- Genre: Singer/Songwriter
- Occupations: Singer-songwriter, musician, filmmaker, music producer, activist, comedy writer, photographer
- Instruments: Vocals, lead guitar, piano, keyboard, drums
- Years active: 1999-present
- Labels: Porteous Media, Aporia Records, Manitou, Mekka Sound, Water Tap Records

David Porteous is a Canadian singer/songwriter, documentary filmmaker, music producer, photographer and comedy writer from Toronto, Ontario, Canada.

Porteous has written and recorded over 30 solo music releases, had his first radio play on CBC Radio 2 at the age of 14, wrote music for an HBO pilot, and has released multiple documentary films. According to Sal Treppiedi of The Great Beyond Music Blog "This may be the hardest working musician you have never heard of.".

Porteous has been chosen by NOW magazine as NXNE Critics Pick, has been featured during Canadian Music Week, CMJ Music Marathon in New York, had features on the CBC, BBC, and The Toronto Star., and was nominated as 1 of 20 out of 6000+ applications to become a torchbearer for the 2008 Summer Olympics in Beijing.

In conjunction with the release of his album Leaving April, Porteous created a music video the Word's First Music Video for the Deaf. "As vibration is a common characteristic of both sound and light waves, I began by transcribing my music into colour," says Porteous, who was inspired to create the music video after befriending a deaf woman. The music video, for his song The Dirt, was featured on CBC News Now. "It's so compelling and intriguing … it takes the musical experience to a whole other level" said Asha Tomlinson, Host of CBC News Now. The music video was featured as music video of the day on various sites, and The Daily What wrote "You don’t need to be able to hear to enjoy this song."

Porteous went on a 10 concert music tour to raise money for the Canadian Women's Foundation during the summer of 2015. Porteous’ motivation for planning this charity tour came from him learning of the work done by the Canadian Women's Foundation. "It’s freighting to think that 21% of women in Canada are raising their children while struggling with poverty" said Porteous. "The Canadian Women’s Foundation is there to help women across the country who deserve the well needed support. It brings me great joy to be able to support the Canadian Women’s Foundation with this music tour." "We’re thrilled that David chose to support the Canadian Women’s Foundation through his East Coast Music Tour" said Jessica Howard, a Senior Writer at the Canadian Women's Foundation. "After a chance meeting with one of our staff members, he generously offered to donate the proceeds of his concerts to the Foundation. The funds raised will help women and girls across Canada move out of violence, out of poverty, and into confidence. Thank you, David!" Including an anonymous corporate donation, Porteous helped raise over $3600 for the foundation.

Porteous organized a series of benefit gigs in memory of Scott Johnson, Radiohead's drum technician, who was killed due to a stage collapse in Toronto in 2012 hours before the Live Nation concert. Having been a big Radiohead for over 20 years, Porteous empathized with Scott's family and the entire Radiohead team for their loss. Porteous used the funds raised at one of the concerts to purchase an electronic drum kit which he donated to the Fort York Library in Toronto in memory of Scott. Philip Selway, Radiohead's drummer, loved the drum kit donation idea so much that he decided to copy Porteous's idea and donated a drum kit to the Manchester Central Library alongside Guy Garvey (Elbow) and Stephen Morris (Joy Division). Radiohead called on Live Nation to "admit their part" in the accident.

David Porteous was awarded First Place in The National Anthem Song Contest hosted by Mongrel Media. The contest was created in conjunction with the release of "Score: A Hockey Musical". David's entry, "Go Canada Go" was a song he wrote and recorded in celebration of Canada's 2010 Olympic Gold Medal Winning Hockey Teams. His song also received praise from Hockey Canada, the official organization for Canada's professional Hockey Teams.

Porteous is known for releasing unique kinds of music and video projects. One of David Porteous' biggest projects is War Music, a documentary feature and music release highlighting Porteous' solo journey across Europe as he followed the footsteps of soldiers who fought during World War Two. For 35 days, Porteous visited battlefields and cemeteries, interviewing veterans and survivors that he met along the way. He also carried a guitar and wrote/record music based on his experiences. War Music has been featured in part on CBC News: Sunday. War Music was chosen as the Top Film Pick of the Day by blogTO. Janice Forsyth, host of the BBC's The Movie Café said David Porteous is "not only a talented singer/songwriter, but a talented filmmaker."

In 2010, Porteous released a music project entitled Twelve Months, whereby he dared himself to write and record an EP a month for an entire year straight. The finished project features 70 songs and over 4 hours of new material.

== Awards and Features ==
- Best Documentary Short Film - Hilltop Film Festival of Diversity and Inclusion
- Best Documentary Film - EduFilm Fest
- First Prize : National Anthem Song Contest hosted by Mongrel Media
- Olympic Torchbearer Nominee : Beijing Summer Games
- Created the World's First Music Video for the Deaf
- Album produced by David Porteous for Canadian band Gruve nominated for "Rock Recording Of The Year" at the Hamilton Music Awards 2011
- Runner-Up : The Framework Remix Contest 2010
- War Music "Top Film Pick Of The Day" BlogTO
- Netflix Open Pitch Day - Shortlist
- Honourable Mention : Billboard Song Contest for the War Music song "Cologne, Germany"
- New World Thinker : by Lenovo Computers 2007
- NOW Magazine Critic's Pick 2004
- Special guest performer for the HBC Run For Canada, CMJ Music Marathon, Canadian Music Week, NXNE, War Child Canada, Nike Run.To, Sistering Fundraiser, and Toronto Sick Kids Hospital Fundraiser
- Maryon Drysdale Award in Toronto for Best Song 2001

== Discography ==
- Robber's Joy (2026)
- THEIA (2026)
- Malotru - Single (2026)
- London - Single (2025)
- Resolute Heart - Single (2021)
- Little Spoon - Single (2020)
- Tigerlily (2020)
- 31 (2015)
- Leaving April (2015)
- black of hearts (2013)
- the red (2013)
- the blue (2013)
- the black (2013)
- 8 Track Session (2013)
- Shelter (2012)
- Memoriam (2012)
- The Pressure (2012)
- Ellingham Hall (2011)
- War Music (2010)
- Go Canada Go - Single (2010)
- The Black Hills (2010)
- Twelve Months (2010)
- Aberdeen E.P. (2008)
- Willowdale E.P. (2008)
- St. Charles E.P. (2008)
- Finding Peace On Isabella (2008)
- Without Any Warming E.P. (2007)
- Parliament (2007)
- No News E.P. (2006)
- Live In Toronto (2006)
- My Fallen Company (2005)
- Missing April (2004)
- Afternoon E.P. (2004)
- From the Walls (2003)
- Battalion (2002)
- Life After Digital E.P. (2001)
- The Mind's Eye (2001)
- My Travel E.P. (2001)
- Portrait-Robot E.P. (2000)
- The Kafka Networking (2000)
- Vota Idiota (1999)

== Film Credits ==
- The Streets of Toronto (2026) - Director, Producer, Writer, Camera, Editor, Music
- 257 Down (2023) - Director, Producer, Writer, Camera, Editor, Music
- Before I Go (2021) - Music
- BAJA (2020) - Director, Producer, Writer, Camera, Editor, Music
- FATBOY RACING! (2020) - Director, Co-Producer, Writer, Camera, Editor, Music
- The Fine Print (2019) - Director, Camera, Editor, Writer, Music
- Racing and Recovery (2019) - Technical Assistant
- A Dialogue (2019) - Music
- Slave to the Grind (2019) - Post Audio Engineer
- The Sicks (2017) - Director, Camera, Editor
- Boy Meets Girl (2015) - Music
- Two Summers in Kosovo (2012) - Audio Engineering
- Carrying on the Dream (2012) - Music
- The Big News (2012) - Audio Engineering
- War Music (2010) - Director, Camera, Editor, Music
- New Girlfriend (2010) - Music
- Never Enough (2009) - Music
- Paisley (2006) - Director
- Women in the War (2005) - Director
- The B&G 2 (2003) - Director, Music
- Life (2003) - Music
- Bad Game (2002) - Director, Music
