= Claudia von Alemann =

German filmmaker (born 1943)

- Born: 23 March 1943 (age 83); Seebach, Germany

Claudia von Alemann (born 23 March 1943 in Seebach) is a German filmmaker.

== Personal life ==
Claudia von Alemann is the daughter of German military officer Hans von Alemann Heine and his wife Ludmilla. She majored in sociology and art history at the Berlin Free University. After graduation, she attended the Ulm School of Design at the Institute for filmmaking. She is married to Cuban director Fernando Pérez and they have a daughter.

== Career ==
Her work began during the 1968 upheavals, and was of political nature and desire for counter-information, moving into more intimate territory later. Throughout her career, and often with experimental techniques, she has sought to make women's experiences visible and to question their representation in cinema and history.

== Filmography ==
- 1966: Easy (Short Film)
- 1967: EXPMNTL Knokke (TV documentary)
- 1967: Foundling (short film)
- 1968: This Is Only the Beginning – The Fight Will Continue (TV documentary)
- 1969: Short Film Festival Oberhausen (TV documentary)
- 1970: Kathleen and Eldridge Cleaver (short documentary)
- 1970: Brigitte (TV documentary short)
- 1971: Germaine Greer (TV documentary short)
- 1971: FLQ Montreal (TV documentary short)
- 1971: Anti-imperialist Women's Congress in Toronto (TV documentary short)
- 1971: Tu luc van doan – through its own efforts (short documentary)
- 1972: Contract (TV documentary short)
- 1972: Accidents at work (TV documentary short)
- 1973: It Depends, Is to Change it (documentary)
- 1974: Namibia (documentary)
- 1977: Films of the Sun and the Night: Ariane Mnouchkine (documentary)
- 1981: Blind Spot
- 1981: The Women's Room
- 1982: Nebelland
- 1984: The Door in the Wall (TV)
- 2000: Vladimir Affordable – A Trojan affair (actress)
- 2000: Shadows of Memory
- 2001: Was once a wild Aquarius
- 2011: The woman with the camera: Portrait of the photographer Abisag Tüllmann
