= The Architecture of Doom =

- Original title: Undergångens arkitektur
- Directed by: Peter Cohen
- Written by: Peter Cohen
- Produced by: Peter Cohen
- Narrated by: Rolf Arsenius; Bruno Ganz (German) Sam Gray (English)
- Cinematography: Mikael Cohen; Gerhard Fromm; Peter Östlund
- Edited by: Peter Cohen
- Music by: Peter Cohen; Sven Ahlin; Richard Wagner (non-original music)
- Production companies: Poj Filmproduktion AB; Stiftelsen Svenska Filminstitutet; Sveriges Television AB; Sandrew Film & Teater AB
- Distributed by: Sandrew Film & Teater AB, Stockholm (1989)
- Release date: October 13, 1989 (Gothenburg)
- Running time: 123 minutes
- Country: Sweden
- Languages: Swedish (Also German and English versions)

The Architecture of Doom (Swedish: Undergångens arkitektur) is a 1989 documentary by Swedish director Peter Cohen and narrated by Rolf Arsenius. German- and English-language versions have also been released.

== Plot ==
The film explores the obsession Adolf Hitler had with his own particular vision of what was and was not aesthetically acceptable and how he applied these notions while running Nazi Germany. His obsession with art he considered pure, in opposition to the supposedly degenerate avant-garde works by Jewish and Soviet artists, reveals itself to be deeply connected to Hitler's equally subjective and strict ideal of physical beauty and health. A series of so-called degenerate art exhibitions were sponsored in order to depict modernist painting and sculpture as expressions of mental illness and general depravity. Classical art that reinforced Hitler's personal taste, from Roman statuary to Dutch oil paintings, was scavenged from across Nazi occupied Europe.

Hitler is shown as an amateur architect, planning new building designs for Nazi Germany that express his vision of a Nordic empire to rival those of classical antiquity. He is said to be intimately familiar with the grand opera houses of Europe. He visits Paris with a group of architects and artists who will be tasked with rebuilding Berlin to suit the Nazi aesthetic. Designs for new structures include depictions of the ruins they will make for distant generations.

The film posits that Hitler's affinity for Greek and Roman antiquity is also expressed in his insistence of a totalizing strategy of war. In what Hitler imagined to be the style of Sparta and Rome, war was meant to annihilate the enemy, enslaving the population and erasing the history of the vanquished.

== Reception ==
Although Caryn James found the period photos and film footage valuable, she thought that The Architecture of Doom was "simplistic" and "dangerously facile." Washington Post reviewer Benjamin Forgey wrote that the film-maker "marshals his arguments and his evidence masterfully," and in a separate review Desson Howe said that the film was a "dryly effective documentary." Austin Chronicle reviewer Steve Davis declared that the "impeccably researched documentary The Architecture of Doom formulates a convincing thesis about Hitler and his legacy." Ed Simmons wrote in Crisis magazine that Cohen had made a "remarkably insightful film which shows the Führer not as a psychotic, an anti-Christ, or even Aryan Angel."

In a 1999 Village Voice article, Michael Giacalone noted that "The Architecture Of Doom shows us that the control of ideals is at the very root of fascism's appeal." And it was judged to be a "brilliantly written and visualized documentary" by Bright Lights Film Journal in 2001. A 2006 review by Emanuel Levy acknowledged that "Bruno Ganz’s poignant narration and Richard Wagner’s music" contributed to the coherence of the documentary.

== Awards ==
- 1991 First prize in the documentary category, Valladolid International Film Festival
- Shown at 1991 Berlin Film Festival (International Forum)
- 1992 Critics Award, São Paulo International Film Festival
- Blue Ribbon Winner, 1993 American Film & Video Festival
- Shown in the 1999 film series A Holocaust Prism: Different Perspectives at the Cinema Arts Centre in Huntington
- Shown in 2012 at Philadelphia Center for Architecture for the monthly series Architecture in Film
- Shown in the 2014 film series Crimes Against Culture: Art and the Nazis at the Georgia Museum of Art

== See also ==
- Art in Nazi Germany
- Eugenics
- Nazi architecture
- Richard Wagner
