= The Ghost Army (film) =

- Theatrical release poster
- Directed by: Rick Beyer
- Screenplay by: Rick Beyer
- Produced by: Rick Beyer
- Narrated by: Peter Coyote
- Cinematography: Dillard Morrison
- Edited by: Jon Neuburger
- Music by: Matt Mariano
- Distributed by: Public Broadcasting Service
- Release date: March 7, 2013 (United States)
- Running time: 68 minutes
- Country: United States
- Language: English

The Ghost Army is a 2013 American documentary about the United States Army 23rd Headquarters Special Troops, produced and directed by Rick Beyer.

== Synopsis ==
The documentary tells the history of the secret U.S. Army unit of 1,100 troops that was set up in 1944 and operated until 1945 in the final stages of World War II in the fight against German army units in various parts of Europe. They used a combination of different ways of visual, sonic, and radio deception to convince the enemy of the presence of specific Army units that were in fact operating elsewhere.

The unit included a large number of visual artists and designers who documented their experiences in paintings and sketches. The material employed in the 23rd Army Headquarters Special Troops' operations included decoys such as inflatable rubber tanks, trucks, jeeps, and cannon, as well as powerful loudspeaker trucks playing sound recordings of various types military heavy activity.

== Interviews ==
- General Wesley Clark - Military and historical analysis
- Peter Coyote - Narrator
- Ed Biow - Private Camouflage Unit
- John Jarvie - Corporal Camouflage Unit
- Victor Dowd - Sergeant Camouflage Unit
- Jack Masey - Corporal Camouflage Unit
- Arthur Shilstone - Corporal Camouflage Unit
- Gil Seltzer - Lieutenant Camouflage Unit
- Joe Spence - Private Camouflage Unit
- Jack McGlynn - Sergeant Sonic Unit
- Harold Flinn - Private Sonic Unit
- Al Albrecht - Corporal Sonic Unit
- Spike Berry - Sergeant Radio Unit
- John Gawne - Author of Ghosts of the ETO
- Stan Nance - Sergeant Radio Unit
- Irving Stempel - Corporal Camouflage Unit
- Bernie Mason - Lieutenant Camouflage Unit
- Dick Syracuse- Lieutenant Sonic Unit
- Bob Tompkins - Sergeant Camouflage Unit

=== Archival footage ===
- Dwight Eisenhower
- Amelia Earhart

== Exhibition ==
The film first premiered at the Salem Film Festival on March 7, 2013. It was shown on PBS on May 21, 2013. It had its European Theatrical Premiere at the Abbaye de Neumünster in Luxembourg on November 27, 2013.

== Film Festivals ==
- Salem Film Festival
- GI Film Festival
- International Historical and Military Film Festival
- Moab Film Festival
- CineSol Film Festival

== Awards ==
Wins

- CINE Golden Eagle: Televised Documentary/History
- Salem Film Festival: Audience Award
- Moab Film Festival: Audience Appeal Award

== Critical Reaction ==
The Ghost Army received overwhelmingly positive reviews. On Metacritic 79 out of 100. David Weigand at the San Francisco Chronicle called it a "mesmerizing documentary", going on to say: "You could call it a kind of World War II version of Argo and it makes for a documentary that is almost as gripping as Ben Affleck's film." Robert Lloyd at The Los Angeles Times called it "fascinating, detailed and oddly delightful." Matt Roush of TV Guide called it "remarkable and memorable…first-rate…entrancing." Dorothy Rabinowitz of the Wall Street Journal commented: "The unit's work was top secret, its members' experiences, recounted in this film, fascinating above all for what they tell about the determined inventiveness, the all-out ambition to try everything, characteristic of that war effort." Washington Post and New York Daily News critics both called the documentary "fascinating."

Mark Feeney at the Boston Globe praised the film while offering a rare note of criticism: "The Ghost Army" can feel a bit padded at times. Like one of those rubber tanks, it's not as imposing as it seems. But also like those tanks, it's memorable and not quite like anything else."

== Feature film adaptation ==
On June 15, 2015, Warner Bros acquired the film adaptation rights to Breyer's novel with Henry Gayden writing the script, and Bradley Cooper, Todd Phillips and Andrew Lazar producing the film. On April 23, 2019, Universal Pictures acquired the project, with Ben Affleck attached to direct, produce, and potentially star in the film with Madison Ainsley and Lazar, and Nic Pizzolatto set to write the script.

== See also ==
- Ghost Army
- List of World War II documentary films
- Category:World War II deception operations
