= Andres Sööt =

Estonian film director and operator

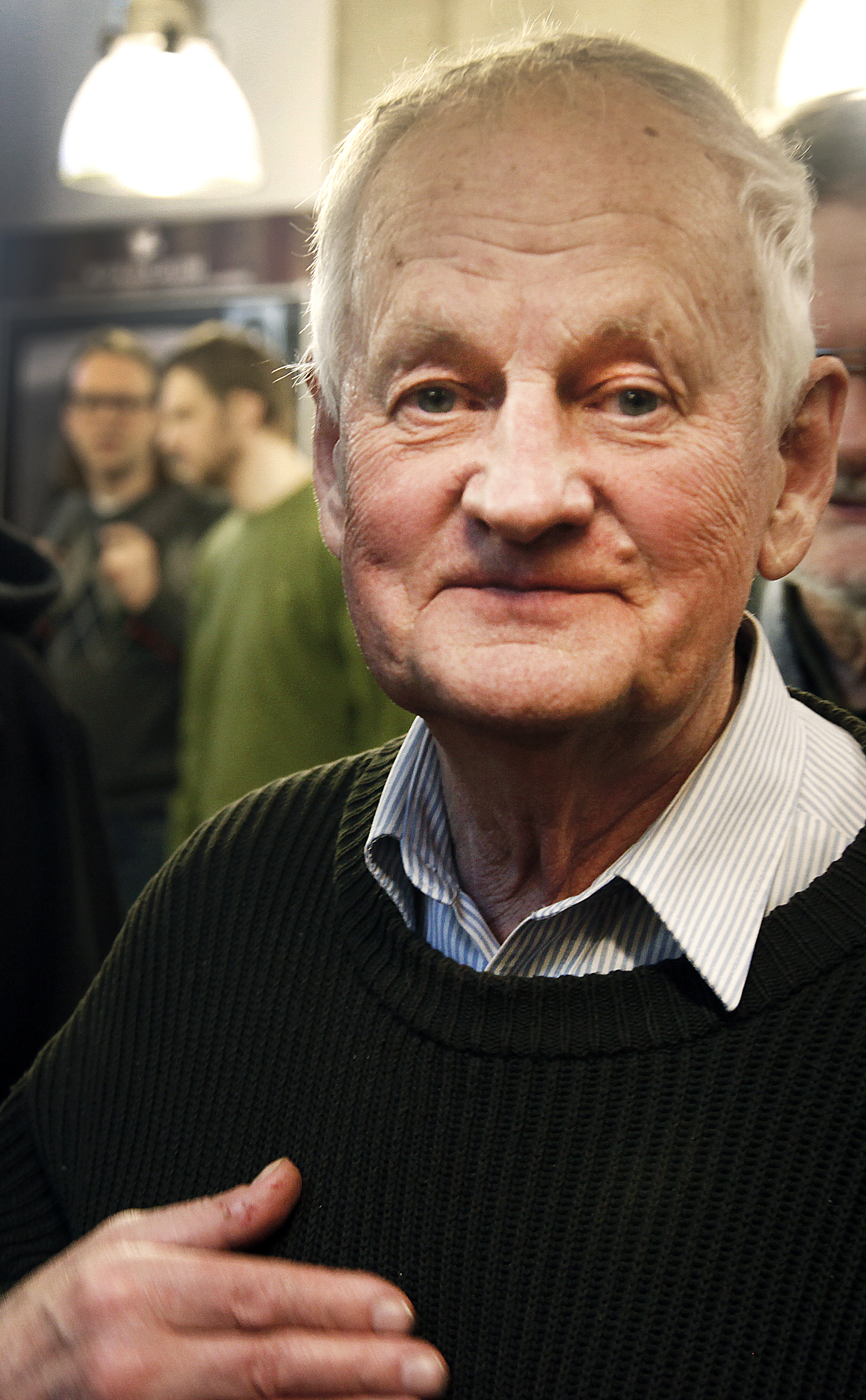
Andres Sööt (2013)

Andres Sööt (born 4 February 1934 in Paide) is an Estonian film director and cinematographer.

In 1963 he graduated from Gerasimov Institute of Cinematography.

In 1997 he was awarded with Order of the National Coat of Arms, V class.

== Filmography ==
- 1965 Kivine Hällilual (documentary short film; cinematographer)
- 1965 Ruhnu Island (documentary short film; cinematographer and director)
- 1966 Maailmaparandajad (documentary short film; cinematographer)
- 1967 Tallina Saladused (documentary short film; cinematographer and director)
- 1969 511 Paremat Fotot Marsist (documentary short film, cinematographer and director)
- 1970 Leelo (documentary short film; cinematographer and director)
- 1970 Jäärlik (documentary short film; cinematographer)
- 1970 Elavad mustrid (documentary film; director and cinematographer)
- 1972 Zemlya Provozhaet (documentary short film; director and cinematographer)
- 1974 Uniafrica (television film; director and cinematographer)
- 1976 Dirigendid (television film; director and cinematographer)
- 1976 Svobodnyy polet (documentary short film; director and cinematographer)
- 1977 Sportlik sajand (documentary short film; director and cinematographer)
- 1978 A Dream (originally: Unenägu) (documentary short film; director and cinematographer)
- 1978 Tuhandeaastane muusika (documentary film; cinematographer)
- 1978 "Arvo Pärt novembris (documentary film; director and operator)
- 1979 Jaanipäev (documentary short film; cinematographer, director and writer)
- 1979 Pulmapildid (documentary short film; cinematographer, director and writer)
- 1981 Rada vabaks! (documentary short film; cinematographer)
- 1982 Reporter (documentary short film; cinematographer, director and writer)
- 1982 Arnold Matteus (documentary film; cinematographer and director)
- 1983 Jälle kevad (documentary short film; cinematographer and director)
- 1986 Rahvamaja (documentary short film; cinematographer, director and writer)
- 1989 Draakoni aasta (documentary film; cinematographer, director and writer)
- 1991 Hobuse aasta (documentary film; cinematographer and writer)
- 1997 "Elasime Eestile" ('We Lived for Estonia') (documentary film; director)
- 2002 Leigo järved (documentary film; cinematographer, director and writer)
