= Zuzana Justman =

Czech-American documentary filmmaker and writer

Zuzana Justman, born Zuzana Pick (born 20 June 1931), is a Czech-American maker of documentary films and writer. She was born in former Czechoslovakia, which she left in 1948 with her mother after surviving two years at Theresienstadt concentration camp during World War II. She went to New York state for college and graduate school, and settled in New York City afterward. After working as a writer and translator, in the late 1980s, she started filmmaking. She has filmed most of her documentaries in the Czech Republic and other European countries, and her topics have been the Holocaust of World War II and postwar history.

== Early life ==
She was born into a Jewish family as Zuzana Pick, the second child of Viktor and Marie Pick in Prague, Czechoslovakia. She had an older brother, Jiří Robert Pick, who became a writer and playwright. During World War II Zuzana, her brother and her parents, Viktor and Marie Pick, were imprisoned for two years in the Terezín concentration camp. Her father was deported to the Auschwitz extermination camp, where he was killed; she, her mother and brother were among the survivors of Theresienstadt. They returned to Prague.

After the communist putsch ("Victorious February") of 1948, Zuzana and her mother emigrated to Argentina. Jiří remained in Prague.

Zuzana left Buenos Aires in 1950 to study at Vassar College. She received an A.B. from Vassar and later a Ph.D. in Slavic Linguistics from Columbia University in New York.

== Career ==
After working as a writer and translator, in 1986 Pick began to make her first film Terezin Diary (completed in 1989). The documentary is about the World War II-era Theresienstadt concentration camp in occupied Czechoslovakia.

In 1993, she wrote, produced and directed Czech Women: Now We Are Free.

Her documentary Voices of the Children (1997), which tells the story of three concentration camp survivors, received the 1999 Emmy Award for best historical program, the Certificate of Merit at the Chicago International Film Festival, in 1998 the Gold Plaque at the Chicago International Television Competition, in 1998 Best Documentary and Audience Choice for Best Documentary awards at Film Fest New Haven, in 1997 the Silver Apple from National Educational Media Network.

Justman's film A Trial in Prague (2001) is about a 1952 show trial in Communist Czechoslovakia (known as the Slansky Trial). It was released theatrically in a great number of venues and it was uniformly well-received both critically and commercially.

Her 2006 adaptation of her brother's 1982 play The Unlucky Man in the Yellow Cap (in original Czech Smolař ve žluté čepici ), was performed at the FringeNYC festival in August 2006.

Her play Waiting for Father premiered at a staged reading at the Czech Center New York on November 16, 2018.

Her story My Terezin Diary was published in The New Yorker on September 9, 2019. It was also published in German translation in Switzerland in Das Magazin in January 2020.

== Marriage and family ==
She was married for nearly 50 years to the late Daniel Justman, a psychiatrist and psychoanalyst. She has two sons Philip and David, from a previous marriage to the late writer David Boroff. She has two stepchildren, Alexander and Jessica Justman, from Daniel's first marriage. Her first husband was Miles/Milos Glaser.

== Film documentaries ==
- A Trial in Prague, 2000 – director, producer, screenwriter
- Voices of the Children, 1997 – director, screenwriter
- Czech Women: Now We Are Free, 1993 – director, screenwriter (with J. Becker, L. Studničková)
- Terezin Diary, 1989 (screenwriter, executive producer), directed and produced by Dan Weissman

== Theatre ==
- The Unlucky Man in the Yellow Cap, directed by Marcy Arlin, lyrics, translation and cooperation Alex Zucker, other lyrics by Peter Fish (also music), Zuzana Justman, J.R. Pick, performed at the FringeNYC festival, August 2006
- Justman's play Waiting for Father premiered at a staged reading at the Czech Center New York on November 16, 2018.
