= Alfred Käärmann =

Estonian resistance fighter

Alfred Käärmann (September 14, 1922 in Hargla – February 4, 2010) was an Estonian resistance fighter, also known as a forest brother, as the Estonians call their guerrillas, and author. In 2007 he was decorated with a military honour in recognition of his service. According to The New York Times, Alfred Käärmann's life is "a monument to man's astounding ability to endure the unbearable."

== Life ==
Alfred Käärmann wrote many books about his life as a resistance fighter. Udumäe kodutütar (The Girl Guide of Udumäe) is about his relationship with his beloved Kleina.

In 1941 he enrolled in a local technical school, where he met and fell in love with a girl named Kleina. Volunteering to fight in the Waffen-SS for the Nazis in February 1944, Käärmann was among those who fought the Red Army until Estonia was occupied by the Soviets seven months later. At the end of the war, the Soviets conducted extensive sweeps to arrest and deport the many Estonians who had served in the German Waffen-ss. Wanting to avoid the fate of his brother, who was arrested and sent to Russia's most dreaded Arctic prison camp near Vorkuta, Käärmann returned home to his family farm on October 4, 1944. After a rest period, he went into hiding in the forest and joined up with fellow Estonian and Latvian Forest brothers, in the belief that it was "better to die in the forest with a weapon in your hands than in a Soviet camp."

On October 17, 1945, he was shot and wounded in a skirmish with Red Army forces. Evading capture by hiding in a swamp, then moving house to house, he was given refuge in the home of an elderly lady. Ten days later, after a message was sent via a Latvian Forest brother, a nurse from Latvia came secretly to the house and amputated his badly injured arm. After recovering from this near-death experience, he was to spend another seven years in the forest. Eventually captured in 1952 by the KGB, he was sentenced to 25 years' hard labour and spent the next 15 years in various prison camps in the Ural Mountains and in Mordovia, eventually being released in 1967. Returning to his home village, he found his beloved Kleina still waiting for him after 23 years.

Three months later he was given 72 hours' notice and expelled from Estonia. His internal passport was stamped "annulled", effectively making him homeless within the Soviet Union, nor was he permitted to take a job until 1972. Drifting from place to place, Käärmann was eventually permitted by the Soviet government to return to Estonia in August 1981. Again returning to his village, he found Kleina still waiting for him, where they spent 11 years together before she died in 1992.

Alfred Käärmann was elected a member of the Congress of Estonia in 1990.

== Published works ==
- Metsavenna käsiraamat, Tallinn : SE&JS, 1999 ([Tallinn] : Pakett)
- Sissitegevuse käsiraamat, [Tallinn] : Kroonu Klubi, [2002] (Tallinn : ETPV Trükikoda)
- Surmavaenlase vastu: Eesti lõunapiiri metsavenna mälestusi Tartu : Tartu University Press, 2000. ISBN 978-9985-56-230-7
- Udumäe Kodutütar: lugu metsavenna armsamast, Tallinn : SE & JS, 1998.
- Vabaduse vaim: Alustatud 16. Okt. 1999, Tartu : Tartu University Press, 2000. ISBN 978-9985-56-519-3

== Awards ==
In 1997, Alfred Käärmann was awarded the Order of the Cross of the Eagle, IV Class.

The Estonian Minister of Defence, Jaak Aaviksoo, awarded the Cross of Merit (third class) on September 10, 2007, to Alfred Käärmann for his part in the struggle to establish Estonia’s sovereignty. The award citation read: "I highly appreciate your contribution as one of many strong and determined men who fought for the freedom of our homeland. I know that it was not easy. This Cross of Merit embodies our sincere gratitude—despite its symbolic essenc—for your bravery at a dark and pivotal time in our history. On behalf of our nation, I thank you for your acts of bravery! I wish you good health, perseverance, and strength of soul."
