= Oeke Hoogendijk =

Dutch documentarian

Oeke Hoogendijk (Amsterdam, 5 August 1961) is a documentary maker, best known for the documentary The New Rijksmuseum, which followed the renovation of the Rijksmuseum in Amsterdam over ten years.

She made her debut with the documentary film The Saved (1998), which won the “Het Gouden Beeld” (Dutch Academy Awards) in 1998 and the “Euro-Comenius Award” in Vienna (1999). Her second film, The Holocaust Experience (2002), had its premiere during IDFA Festival 2002 and was selected for several festivals in Europe and the US. I 2019 her My Rembrandt was released, a movie about art and art dealers.

== Biography ==
Hoogendijk graduated in 1990 from the Utrecht School of the Arts. Over the years Oeke Hoogendijk specialized in documentary films about art. They are often long-running projects with a cinematographic approach that involves capturing the content as much as possible in scenes.

== The New Rijksmuseum (Het Nieuwe Rijksmuseum) ==
Over a period of 10 years Hoogendijk followed the large-scale renovation of the world-famous Rijksmuseum in Amsterdam. She edited the resulting 400 hours of material into a four-episode television series The New Rijksmuseum (episode 1 and 2 in 2008 and episode 3 and 4 in 2013). A documentary film version for cinema was released in 2014 and received international critical acclaim.

The New Rijksmuseum received a large number of awards in the Netherlands and abroad, including the Golden Calf at the Netherlands Film Festival, both the Jury Award and the Prix du Meilleur Documentaire at the Festival International de Films de Montréal, the Prix d’Italia, and Best Dutch Documentary at IDFA 2014.

== My Rembrandt (Mijn Rembrandt) ==
Her documentary film My Rembrandt had its world premiere on 24th of November 2019 at IDFA Festival. The documentary film provides fascinating insight into what makes the work of this Dutch master technically so extraordinary, and why different people are so deeply affected by his oeuvre, or a specific work. The films also captures the stories how his paintings, centuries after Rembrandt’s death, are still a source of drama and gripping plot twists.
