= The Story of Chaim Rumkowski and the Jews of Lodz =

- Directed by: Peter Cohen and Bo Kuritzén
- Produced by: POJ Filmproduction AB with SVTI
- Release date: 1982
- Running time: 55 minutes
- Country: Sweden
- Language: English

The Story of Chaim Rumkowski and the Jews of Łódź is a 1982 documentary film that uses archival film footage and photographs to narrate the story of one of the Holocaust's most controversial figures, Chaim Rumkowski, a Jew put in charge of the Łódź Ghetto by the German occupation authorities during World War II.

== Summary ==
Following the 1939 invasion of Poland by Nazi Germany, Rumkowski, a childless sixty-two-year-old man with billowy white hair and black circular glasses, was appointed the Judenrat Elder in the Łódź Ghetto where 230,000 Polish Jews were confined during the Holocaust in occupied Poland. Rumkowski created an industry within which Jews could work and make themselves useful to the Nazis to avoid the slaughter of the Holocaust. But his record of establishing a temporary refuge for the Jews was overwhelmed by the fact that to appease the Nazis he handed over almost the entire population to Nazi extermination camps. Old photographs and the very rare surviving film footage of the Łódź ghetto serve as the visuals for a documentary that asks how much people should be willing to compromise to survive.

It seems that at the dawn of his power, Rumkowski was full of good intentions. He established hospitals, organized a fire department, set up a government, and cleaned the ghetto streets. Factory work gave the inhabitants a sense of purpose, and social welfare programs and institutions provided order and a feeling of community. At Łódź, Jews didn't die in the streets; instead, they died respectfully in hospitals. And of the industry he made there he said,"Our children and our grandchildren will recall with pride the names of those who gave us the opportunity to work and the right to live." In that speech to ghetto inhabitants, he continued, "We have only our production to thank for our survival."

But then when the Nazis began to demand Łódź inhabitants be relocated to extermination camps, Rumkowski selected who would be sent away and asked that they leave without hostility. He began by sending away the Ghetto's criminals but eventually pleaded that parents allow him to send away their children.

Chaim Rumkowski's story raises difficult moral questions regarding power and compliance. "We must cut off the legs to save the body," Rumkowski asserted. "I must stretch out my hands and beg," he declared to the Łódź Ghetto inhabitants: "Brothers and sisters—Hand them over to me! Fathers and mothers—Give me your children!" With these words, a man who once directed an orphanage pleaded for Jewish parents to peacefully surrender their children to extermination camps.

The same complexity that's found in Rumkowski's character is manifested in the Łódź ghetto itself. The thriving textile industry in the ghetto might have kept its inhabitants alive, but the goods they produced were a tremendous service to the Nazis. The Jews in the ghetto, unknowingly, helped build and facilitate Nazi concentration camps through Europe. They fed the mouth that bit them.

== Reception ==
The New York Times gave the documentary a positive review. It described the film as "fine," "moving," and said it, "should be seen."

== Awards ==
In 1982, The Story of Chaim Rumkowski and the Jews of Łódź won an Interfilm Award- Honorable Mention at the International Filmfestival Mannheim-Heidelberg.

== See also ==
Other Holocaust documentaries:

- Luboml
- Paradise Camp
- The Sixth Battalion
- They Were Not Silent
- Pola's March
- Marion's Triumph
- Shoah
- Auschwitz: The Nazis and the Final Solution
