= The Jewess and the Captain =

- Directed by: Ulf von Mechow
- Cinematography: Reinhard Burgheim
- Edited by: Heike Fischer
- Release date: 1994
- Running time: 92 minutes
- Country: Germany
- Languages: English and Russian

The Jewess And The Captain is a 1994 documentary, directed by Ulf von Mechow about a Holocaust love affair between Ilse Stein, an eighteen-year-old Jewish girl, and Willi Schultz, the Nazi captain in charge of the Minsk Ghetto.

After the Holocaust, Ilse Stein became a minor celebrity and the subject of two romance novels. The film conducts interviews with Ilse just before her death, reveals shocking archival photographs of her and Schultz, and raids the KGB's secret documents to piece together the facts of their romance and uncover a real-life love story with a bizarre twist.

== Summary ==
Ilse and her family were removed from their home in Germany in 1941 and deported to a Nazi ghetto in Minsk. The same month that the Steins arrived, Schultz was sent to the ghetto to supervise its work operations. Soon after his arrival, Schultz lost almost all of his workers to a Nazi massacre that killed over 5,000 of the ghetto's Jews in one night. When he went to the ghetto the next day to select new workers, Ilse caught his eye—he chose her and made her the leader of the group.

Ilse's and Schultz's unlikely love developed amidst the constant gore and death within the ghetto. Schultz's personal photographs from the time, taken inside his office, show Ilse not as a terror-stricken young woman, but a smiling, lanky beauty, happily reclining with a book or diligently working at a typewriter. She is photographed with the grace and ease of a happy-go-lucky teenager-in-love.

A romance elevated Ilse out of the horror around her, and it was love that transformed Schultz, too. When another pogrom broke out in the ghetto, killing a large number of Jews on the night of July 20, 1942. Schultz was moved to save not just Ilse but as many of her fellow Jews as he could. That night, he locked all of his workers in the cellar of the administration building.

As Jewish deaths at the hands of the Nazis continued to escalate as time progressed, the previously loyal German captain began to plot to save his lover and more than two dozen other Jews. Eventually, with the help of neighboring resistance fighters, Schultz deserted the German army and helped plan a grand escape that saved the lives of Ilse Stein and twenty-five other Jews.
