= Canada at War =

- Genre: Documentary
- Written by: Donald Brittain
- Narrated by: Budd Knapp
- Composer: Kenneth Campbell
- Country of origin: Canada
- Original language: English
- No. of seasons: 1
- No. of episodes: 13

Production
- Executive producer: Peter Jones
- Producers: Stanley Clish; Donald Brittain
- Running time: 30 minutes
- Budget: $318,205

Original release
- Network: CBC Television
- Release: 4 April – 27 June 1962

Canada at War (French: Le Canada en guerre) is a 1962 Canadian World War II documentary television series that aired on CBC Television.

== Premise ==
Production of this National Film Board of Canada documentary series began in 1958, using numerous film sources such as British films available in Canada, captured German footage, newsreels and footage taken by Canadians within Canada and in various nations. The series was narrated by Budd Knapp based on writing by associate producer Donald Brittain. The composer for the series was Canadian composer Kenneth Campbell.

== Production ==
Production on Canada at War started in 1958, with two million metres of archival footage from the Canadian Army Film and Photo Unit, Associated Screen News of Canada, and two National Film Board series, Canada Carries On and The World in Action, being indexed. The series was produced by Donald Brittain, Stanly Clish, and Peter Jones. The thirteen episodes of the series cost $318,205 (equivalent to $3,286,117 in 2025) to produce.

== Episodes ==
1. "Dusk" (1936 – March 1940) features the early developments of World War II from Germany's war preparations to Canada's decision to join the Allies
2. "Blitzkrieg" (April to November 1940) Nazi expansion, Italy's decision to engage in war, the London Blitz and Canadian developments such as conscription
3. "Year of Siege" (September 1940 to October 1941) covers the Battle of the Atlantic, Operation Barbarossa and Canadian troops The Winnipeg Grenadiers and the Royal Rifles leaving for Hong Kong
4. "Days of Infamy" (December 1941 to June 1942) follows the Pearl Harbor attack and the beginning of America's war effort
5. "Ebbtide" (July to September 1942) featured the failed Dieppe Raid and the zenith of Nazi power
6. "Turn of the Tide" (October 1942 to July 1943) covers Allied successes of the Second Battle of El Alamein and the Guadalcanal Campaign
7. Road to Ortona (July 1943 to January 1944) covers Allied entry into Italy and Canada's role in the Battle of Ortona
8. "New Directions" (December 1943 to June 1944) deals with the wartime foreign policy initiatives of William Lyon Mackenzie King with the Commonwealth and with Canadian assistance with supplies to Russia
9. "The Norman Summer" (June to September 1944) covers the Normandy landings and eventual Liberation of Paris; Canadian forces also return to Dieppe
10. "Cinderella on the Left" (late 1944) covers German efforts at the Battle of the Bulge and their losses of rocket facilities
11. "Crisis on the Hill" (September 1944 to March 1945) features further Allied successes along the Siegfried Line and in the invasion of Italy; meanwhile, Canadians protest the conscription policy
12. "V Was For Victory" (April to August 1945) covers the final stages of World War II with the defeat of Germany and Japan, the discovery of concentration camps and the American nuclear attacks on Japan
13. "The Clouded Dawn" covers the post-war period and the beginning of the Cold War; subjects in this final episode include the Nuremberg Trials and the defection of Soviet cipher clerk Igor Gouzenko to Canada

== Works cited ==
- Evans, Gary (1991). In the National Interest: A Chronicle of the National Film Board of Canada from 1949 to 1989. University of Toronto Press. ISBN 0802027849.
