= They Were Not Silent =

They Were Not Silent: The Jewish Labor Movement and the Holocaust
- Directed by: Roland Millman
- Produced by: Roland Millman
- Release date: 1998
- Running time: 30 min.
- Language: English

They Were Not Silent is a documentary about the Jewish Labor Committee's anti-Nazi movement in the United States before, during and after World War II. The film features rare archival footage and photographs along with interviews with labor veterans, Holocaust survivors and scholars. It explores how international Jewry worked to help Jews and non-Jews in Germany, Poland, and elsewhere in Europe.
The JLC's role has changed over the years. A trade unionist who has focused on JLC history, Kenneth Burt, says he hopes that the documentary will encourage new interest in the organization.

== Summary ==
As Adolf Hitler was coming to power in Germany in the 1930s, most Americans, struggling with the Great Depression, were preoccupied with their own concerns. Many had an isolationist attitude towards foreign affairs. But many Jewish trade-unionists took notice of the troubling goings-on in Germany, and established the Jewish Labor Committee in New York City in early 1934 to respond to the rise of Nazism. Many of its members were Jewish immigrants who still spoke Yiddish and remained intensely connected to the Eastern European countries from which they or their parents had emigrated. These concerned individuals united to fight against Nazi anti-Semitism for their friends and relatives across the ocean, as well as other potential victims of the Nazis.

“When Hitler came to power most people had one of two feelings,” explains Bernard Bellush, one of the labor historians interviewed in the documentary. Most Americans were either apathetic to German politics because of domestic issues, or they thought that “Hitler was a clown—he’s going to take over power and everyone is going to see he’s a blooming idiot.’”

The founding president of the JLC, B.C. Vladeck, was celebrated as a passionate orator who could rally a crowd with his enthusiasm. As Hitler ascended to power, Vladeck told audiences, “A great silence is descending upon Europe—a silence, like a sinister shroud of death. The instruments of torture that Hitler has prepared for the Jews have been turned on the labor unionists.”

As the JLC grew in size and influence it worked tirelessly to challenge Nazi power. Even before the war began, Jewish leaders worked to send an anti-Nazi message to the American public, especially but not only the American trade union movement, and organized boycotts against German-made goods. United in the struggle, mothers and little old ladies held giant cardboard signs to picket stores selling products that were produced under the Third Reich.

In 1936, the organization petitioned against the United States' participation in the upcoming Olympic Games in Germany. When the campaign failed and American athletes traveled across the ocean to compete, the JLC organized the “Counter-Olympics” at Randall's Island in New York City. Amateur athletes from across the country participated and, perhaps more importantly, the event received extensive nationwide press coverage.

The JLC also were able to help a number of Jews and non-Jews to escape from Europe, and aided a number of anti-Nazi the underground resistance movements there. At the same time that apathetic, isolationist and anti-war Americans were saying things like this, from an archival clip used in this documentary: "Let the Germans fight their battle, they mean nothing to us," the JLC was busy arranging for aid to get to people who would eventually be part of the Warsaw Ghetto Uprising.

Even after the Holocaust was over, the JLC continued to help displaced Jews, sending aid to survivors in refugee camps across the globe, and helping relocate people to the U.S., Canada, Israel and Australia.

The enormous loss of life and destruction of Jewish communities throughout Europe during the Holocaust that came despite the JLC's best efforts left many members of the JLC feeling dejected. One of the academics interviewed in the movie laments in retrospect that it was “too little, too late”, but takes some solace from the fact that “nonetheless, it was an expression of fraternity and solidarity”.

== See also ==
- General Jewish Labor Union
- Tsukunft
- Yevsektsiya
- Jewish Labor Committee
