= A Story about a Bad Dream =

- Reenactment of Eva sitting on the railroad tracks (taken from the film)
- Directed by: Pavel Štingl
- Release date: 2000
- Running time: 50 mins.
- Country: Czech Republic
- Language: Czech with English subtitles

A Story about a Bad Dream (Czech: O zlém snu) is a 2000 docudrama made by Czech director Pavel Štingl, dramatizing the diary of Eva Erbenová, a young girl who survived the Holocaust. The film based on her 1994 memoir Vyprávěj mámo, jak to bylo [Tell Me Mom How It Was] uses reenactments. With its child narrator and naive view of World War II, it is intended to appeal to a younger audience.

== Summary ==
A Story about a Bad Dream is an account of the Holocaust told from the perspective of a young girl named Evie, who makes sense of the world from her parents' expressions and her own feelings of discomfort and unhappiness.

"Suddenly I was like a grown up," the narrator confides, describing her arrival at the deportation camp, "I had to take care of myself". She offers a unique and highly personal look at the brutality played out during the Second World War.

Evie, like most children, believes her parents control the universe, so she's terrified and shocked when she sees them powerless to Nazi orders. When the family is told of their forced relocation to Theresienstadt, Evie catches the nuances in her parents' expressions and behavior. "I've never seen my parents look so serious," she confides, and their change in demeanor frightens her.

Disease, squalor and death are prevalent at the camp. When they were later sent to a concentration camp, her father was separated from her and her mother. Hunger left Evie looking like a skeleton. When all hope seems to be lost, Evie miraculously escaped and was rescued.

The style of the film is consistently childish. Drawing directly from what's written in the diary, the narrator's vocabulary is too immature to be affected by political correctness, cliché, and prejudice. While the narrator's speech might be limited, the tone is unavoidably honest. Later, when she's riding up to the home of the modest German farming family who rescues her, she says, "I felt like a princess approaching her castle."

== Awards ==
The film won a documentary award at the Trilobit Awards in 2000.
