= Pola's March =

- Pola
- Directed by: Jonathan Gruber
- Release date: 1998
- Running time: 70 min.
- Country: United States
- Languages: English and Polish

Pola's March is a 1998 documentary made by Jonathan Gruber about a Holocaust survivor, Pola Susswein's emotional trip back to her childhood home in Poland after fifty years spent in Israel, trying to forget her painful past.

== Summary ==
“This Earth is soaked with blood,” Pola says, dispassionately. Her ability to stomach the harshest of realities - which allowed her to go on after the Holocaust, marry, raise children and live normally - is tested when she returns to a place that brought her unimaginable suffering.

Pola's trip marks a dramatic shift in her mentality. After half a century, Pola, who never spoke about the Holocaust to her children, decides to travel back to Kraków with a bus full of high school and college students, lecturing and sharing her stories as they go. Her own children and grandchildren, curious about their family history and eager to offer support, join her as well.

Before she takes off, Pola confides to the camera that she knows this trip will not be pleasant, but she feels it's necessary to confront truths she's been avoiding.

The painful rumors that the Holocaust never happened spurred Pola to share her story. She realizes that Holocaust survivors are growing old, and when they die the truth about World War II could die with them. Pola feels obligated to educate young people in hopes of preventing future acts of inhumanity.

Not everyone is supportive of Pola's decision to return. Her friends who also survived the Holocaust fear that her trip will take an unnecessary emotional toll. One of Pola's cousins went back to Poland only to want to leave the entire time. Other friends promised themselves they would never return. These women believe their old memories are vivid and torturous enough. They don't want new images to have to suppress in order to live happily.

But the young students are grateful for her presence. They strain their necks and lean over seats to ask Pola questions. She brings to life what they studied in history books. Her stories fascinate them, and they sit quietly and attentively whenever she offers her knowledge.

Pola's journey is full of emotional highs and lows. She's elated see her old apartment and speak to the new tenants. She's happy to walk through the old buildings she lived in as a girl and look at old photographs. But her stomach turns in knots when she visits the concentration camps and she is full of doubt as to whether or not the trip was a good idea.

The Holocaust made Pola especially tough. After experiencing such great loss, she's become somewhat numb to pain. “I very seldom cry. Almost never,” she explains. But even she has to cover her face when sitting on the crematorium at Auschwitz.

== Awards ==
- Pola's March won a Crystal Heart Award at the Heartland Film Festival in 1998.

== See also ==
- Holocaust denial
- Holocaust survivors
