= List of Holocaust films =

These films deal with the Holocaust in Europe, comprising both documentaries and narratives. They began to be produced in the early 1940s before the extent of the Holocaust at that time was widely recognized.

The films span a range of genres, with documentary films including footage filmed both by the Germans for propaganda and by the Allies, compilations, survivor accounts and docudramas, and narrative films including war films, action films, love stories, psychological dramas, and even comedies.

== 1940s ==
Year	Country	Title	Director	Notes
1942	United States	Once Upon a Honeymoon	Leo McCarey	Ginger Rogers' character helps her Jewish maid and the maid's two children escape Poland by switching passports with her. Nazi soldiers subsequently notice Rogers' character’s passport, and she and Cary Grant's character (both Irish-Americans) are put in a concentration camp populated by prisoners in Orthodox Jewish dress. Rogers and Grant are later sprung by the American consulate (as the ultimate point of the film is to portray Hitler's spread throughout Europe).
1944	Poland	Majdanek: Cemetery of Europe	Aleksander Ford	One of the first films to include footage of concentration camps
1945	Soviet Union	The Unvanquished	Mark Donskoy	First feature film to show mass murder of Jews and hunting for them on the occupied territories. 1946 Venice festival award.
1946	United States	The Stranger	Orson Welles	First feature film to include footage of concentration camps
1946	Germany	Die Mörder sind unter uns	Wolfgang Staudte	The first Rubble Film and the first German film to address Nazi atrocities. English title: Murderers Among Us
1947	Germany	Ehe im Schatten	Kurt Maetzig	One of the earliest DEFA productions. English title: Marriage in the Shadows
1947	Germany	Zwischen Gestern und Morgen	Harald Braun	One of the first German films to be made in Munich after the war and the first to openly address the Holocaust. English title: Between Yesterday and Tomorrow
1948	Germany	Morituri	Eugen York	
1948	United States	The Search	Fred Zinnemann	In post-war Berlin, an American private helps a lost Czech boy find his mother.
1948	Poland	Ulica Graniczna	Aleksander Ford	A Polish film about the uprising in the Warsaw Ghetto, it premieres at the Venice Film Festival; it is released in English as Border Street in 1950.
1948	Poland	The Last Stage	Wanda Jakubowska	English titles: The Last Stage, The Last Stop
1949	Italy	L'ebreo errante	Goffredo Alessandrini	First Italian film to openly address the Holocaust
1949	United States; West Germany	Lang ist der Weg	Herbert B. Fredersdorf; Marek Goldstein	Yiddish title: Lang iz der Veg; English title: Long Is the Road

== 1950s ==
Year	Country	Title	Director	Notes
1950	Czechoslovakia	Distant Journey	Alfréd Radok	English title: Distant Journey
1953	United States	The Juggler	Edward Dmytryk	In 1949, former concentration camp inmate and Berlin native Hans Muller immigrates to Israel where, due to psychological problems, he cannot adjust to peacetime life.
1956	United States	Singing in the Dark	Max Nosseck	Musical about Holocaust survivors with amnesia
1958–59	United States	Pursuit	Ian Sharp	Anthology series
1959	East Germany; Bulgaria	Stars	Konrad Wolf	English title: Stars
1959	United States	The Diary of Anne Frank	George Stevens	Won three Academy Awards, including Best Supporting Actress
1959	Italy; Yugoslavia; France	Kapò	Gillo Pontecorvo	
1959	Poland	Biały niedźwiedź	Jerzy Zarzycki	A Jew who escaped from a transport to a concentration camp is hiding by posing for tourists disguised as a polar bear.

== 1960s ==
Year	Country	Title	Director	Notes
1960	Czechoslovakia	Romeo, Julie a tma	Jiří Weiss	English title: Romeo, Juliet and Darkness. Concerns Operation Anthropoid.
1960	United States	Exodus	Otto Preminger	Based on the novel by Leon Uris; screenplay by Dalton Trumbo.
1960	Yugoslavia	Deveti krug	France Stiglic	English title: The Ninth Circle
1961	Italy	Gold of Rome	Carlo Lizzani	Italian title: L'oro di Roma
1961	United States	Judgment at Nuremberg	Stanley Kramer	Winner of Academy Awards for Best Actor and Best Adapted Screenplay
1961	Poland	Samson	Andrzej Wajda	
1961	Belgium	L'enclos	Armand Gatti	Italian title: Otto ore al buio. Prix de la Critique at 1961 Cannes Festival.
1963	Poland	Passenger	Andrzej Munk	
1963	East Germany	Naked Among Wolves	Frank Beyer	
1964	United States	The Pawnbroker	Sidney Lumet	A Jewish pawnbroker, victim of Nazi persecution, loses all faith in his fellow man until he realizes too late the tragedy of his actions.
1965	East Germany	Chronik eines Mordes	Joachim Hasler	English title: Chronicle of a Murder
1965	Czechoslovakia	The Shop On Main Street	Ján Kadár & Elmar Klos	
1965	Germany	The Investigation	Peter Weiss	Also as TV play "Die Ermittlung" (1966)
1966	United States	The Last Chapter	Benjamin Rothman & Lawrence Rothman, S.L. Shneiderman	Depicts the destruction of Polish Jewry by the Nazi onslaught, includes rare footage of Jewish life in early 20th century Poland.
1967	United States	The Diary of Anne Frank	Alex Segal	TV movie: Harrowing story of a young Jewish girl who, with her family and their friends, is forced into hiding in an attic in Nazi-occupied Amsterdam.
1969	France	Army of Shadows	Jean Pierre Melville	

== 1970s ==
Year	Country	Title	Director	Notes
1970	Poland	Apel	Ryszard Czekała	Animated short film
1970	Poland	Epilog norymberski	Jerzy Antczak	TV Theatre reconstruction of Nuremberg trials
1970	Italy; West Germany	The Garden of the Finzi-Continis	Vittorio De Sica	Italian title: Il Giardino dei Finzi-Contini; based on the novel by Giorgio Bassani; Oscar for Best Foreign Film
1970	Yugoslavia	Hranjenik	Vatroslav Mimica	English title: The Fed Ones
1972	United States	The Day the Clown Cried	Jerry Lewis	Unfinished film never shown to the general public
1972	United States	Cabaret	Bob Fosse	American musical drama film set in Berlin during the Weimar Republic in 1931, as the Nazi Party rises towards power.
1974	Israel; West Germany	Sie sind frei, Dr. Korczak	Aleksander Ford	English title: The Martyr
1974	United Kingdom	QB VII	Tom Gries	TV miniseries; based on Leon Uris novel of same name
1974	Italy	The Night Porter	Liliana Cavani	
1974	United Kingdom; West Germany	The Odessa File	Ronald Neame	Based on Frederick Forsyth novel of same name
1975	East Germany	Jacob the Liar	Frank Beyer	Based on the novel by Jurek Becker
1975	United States	The Hiding Place	James F. Collier	Based on the autobiography of Corrie ten Boom
1975	Italy	Seven Beauties	Lina Wertmüller	
1975	United States	The Man in the Glass Booth	Arthur Hiller	
1976	United States	Marathon Man	John Schlesinger	
1976	France	Monsieur Klein	Joseph Losey	
1976	Spain	Voyage of the Damned	Stuart Rosenberg	
1977	Italy	L'ultima orgia del III Reich	Cesare Canevari	
1977	United States	Julia	Fred Zinnemann	Based on a chapter from Lillian Hellman's 1973 book Pentimento about the author's relationship with a lifelong friend, "Julia", who fought against the Nazis in the years prior to World War II. It received 11 Academy Award nominations including for Best Picture
1978	United States	Holocaust	Marvin J. Chomsky	TV miniseries, popularised the term 'Holocaust'.
1978	Yugoslavia	Okupacija u 26 slika	Lordan Zafranović	
1979	West Germany	Baranski	Werner Masten	
1979	West Germany	The Tin Drum	Volker Schlöndorff	
1979	West Germany	David	Peter Lilienthal	
1979	United States	The House on Garibaldi Street	Peter Collinson	

== 1980s ==
Year	Country	Title	Director	Notes
1980	United States	The Diary of Anne Frank	Boris Sagal	TV movie
1980	United States	Playing For Time	Daniel Mann	TV film; based on the autobiography of Fania Fénelon; adaptation by Arthur Miller
1981	France	Les Uns et les Autres	Claude Lelouch	English title: Bolero
1982	West Germany	Ein Stück Himmel	Franz Peter Wirth	TV mini-series; based on the autobiography of Janina David
1982	United States	Sophie's Choice	Alan J. Pakula	Based on the novel by William Styron; Meryl Streep won Academy Award for Best Actress
1982	Austria	God Does Not Believe in Us Anymore	Axel Corti	http://www.jewishfilm.org/Catalogue/films/goddoesnotbelieveinus.htm
1983	France; Canada	Au Nom de Tous les Miens	Robert Enrico	English title: For Those I Loved; based on the book by Martin Gray
1983	Hungary	Jób lázadása	Barna Kabay	English title: Job's Revolt
1983	United States	To Be Or Not To Be	Alan Johnson	A remake of the 1942 comedy, starring Mel Brooks and Anne Bancroft.
1983	United States; West Germany; Italy	The Scarlet and the Black	Jerry London	TV movie; based on the J.P. Gallagher novel The Scarlet Pimpernel of the Vatican
1983	United States	The Winds of War	Dan Curtis	Based on the novel by Herman Wouk;
1984	Yugoslavia	Banjica	Sava Mrmak	TV mini-series
1984	West Germany; United Kingdom	Forbidden	Anthony Page	
1984	West Germany	Wannseekonferenz	Heinz Schirk	TV movie
1985	United States	Wallenberg: A Hero's Story	Lamont Johnson	Feature documentary about the effects of the Holocaust on the next generation of Jews and Germans.
1985	Soviet Union	Come and See	Elem Klimov	Russian title: Idi i smotri, Winner Venice Classics Award for Best Restored film
1985	Canada	Dark Lullabies	Irene Lilienheim Angelico and Abbey Jack Neidik	
1987	United Kingdom; Yugoslavia	Escape from Sobibor	Jack Gold	Based on the book by Richard Rashke; Nominated for three Golden Globe Awards; won two, including Best Limited Series or Motion Picture made for Television
1987	France	Au revoir les enfants	Louis Malle	
1988	Poland; United States	And the Violins Stopped Playing	Alexander Ramati	
1988	United States	The Attic: The Hiding of Anne Frank	John Erman	TV movie
1988	United States	Hanna's War	Menahem Golan	
1988	Poland	Kornblumenblau	Leszek Wosiewicz	The film was selected as the Polish entry for the Best Foreign Language Film at the 62nd Academy Awards, but was not accepted as a nominee.
1988	United States	War and Remembrance	Dan Curtis	TV mini-series; based on the novel by Herman Wouk, and the sequel to The Winds of War; Nominated for 15 Primetime Emmy Awards; won 3 including Outstanding Miniseries
1989	United States	Enemies, a Love Story	Paul Mazursky	Based on the novel by Isaac Bashevis Singer
1989	United States	Music Box	Costa-Gavras	
1989	United States	Triumph of the Spirit	Robert M. Young	
1989	United States	Murderers Among Us: The Simon Wiesenthal Story	Brian Gibson (director)	

== 1990s ==
Year	Country	Title	Director	Notes
1990	West Germany	Abrahams Gold	Jörg Graser	
1990	West Germany	Der Tod ist ein Meister aus Deutschland	Lea Rosh & Eberhard Jäckel	
1990	Australia	Father	John Power	
1990	Poland	Korczak	Andrzej Wajda	Based on the true story of Dr. Janusz Korczak and his attempt to keep alive the children in his Warsaw Ghetto orphanage.
1990	Germany; France; Poland	Europa Europa	Agnieszka Holland	Nominated for the Academy Award for Best Writing (Adapted Screenplay)
1991	Poland	Jeszcze tylko ten las	Jan Lomnicki	English title: Just Beyond That Forest
1991	Czechoslovakia	Poslední motýl	Karel Kachyňa	English title: The Last Butterfly
1991	United States	Never Forget	Joseph Sargent	TV movie; based on the life of Mel Mermelstein
1991	Canada	The Quarrel	Eli Cohen	Based on the story My Quarrel with Hersh Rasseyner by Chaim Grade
1992	United Kingdom; France	Prague	Ian Sellar	
1992	United States	Alan & Naomi	Sterling Van Wagenen	Based on a novel by Myron Levoy
1992	United States	The Witness	Chris Gerolmo	Short film
1993	Italy; France	Jona che visse nella balena	Roberto Faenza	English title: Jonah Who Lived in the Whale, aka Look to the Sky
1993	United States	Schindler's List	Steven Spielberg	Based on the novel by Thomas Kenneally about the real-life Schindler, a popular industrialist who cleverly manipulated the Nazis to save others, this movie won 7 Academy Awards, including Best Picture.
1993	United States	Swing Kids	Thomas Carter	Young teens in Nazi Germany listen to banned swing music and deal with the pressures of joining the Nazi Youth Army.
1994	Austria	Totschweigen	Margareta Heinrich & Eduard Erne	The subject of the film is the massacre of Rechnitz
1995	France	Les Misérables	Claude Lelouch	
1995	Japan	Anne no Nikki	Akinori Nagaoka	Anime adaptation of The Diary of Anne Frank
1996	United States	Hidden in Silence	Richard A. Colla	A True Story about the Podgórski sisters who rescued 13 Jews from the Przemyśl Ghetto.
1996	United States	The Empty Mirror	Barry J. Hershey	
1996	United States	The Man Who Captured Eichmann	William A. Graham	Based on the book Eichmann in My Hands by Peter Z. Malkin
1996	United States	Mother Night	Keith Gordon	Based on the novel by Kurt Vonnegut, and starring Nick Nolte.
1996	United States	The Ring	Armand Mastroianni	TV film; based on the novel by Danielle Steel
1996	United States	The Substance of Fire	Daniel J. Sullivan	Based on the play by Jon Robin Baitz
1996	Hungary	A hetedik szoba	Márta Mészáros	English title: The Seventh Room. Dramatic portrayal of the life of Edith Stein, a nun and Auschwitz victim who was later canonized in the Roman Catholic Church
1997	Italy; France; Germany; Switzerland	La Tregua	Francesco Rosi	English title: The Truce. Based on the autobiography by Primo Levi
1997	United States	Visas and Virtue	Chris Tashima	Short film; based on the play by Tim Toyama
1997	Italy	La vita è bella	Roberto Benigni	English title: Life is Beautiful. Won three Academy Awards, including Best Actor for Robert Benigni
1997	Denmark; United Kingdom; Germany	The Island on Bird Street	Søren Kragh-Jacobsen	Based on the book by Uri Orlev
1997	United Kingdom	Bent	Sean Mathias	Based on the play by Martin Sherman
1998	United States	Apt Pupil	Bryan Singer	Based on the novela by Stephen King
1998	Netherlands; Belgium	Left Luggage	Jeroen Krabbé	Based on the novel by Carl Friedman
1998	United States	Miracle at Midnight	Ken Cameron	TV movie about the rescue of the Danish Jews
1998	United States	Pola's March	Jonathan Gruber	
1998	France; Belgium; Netherlands; Israel	Train of Life	Radu Mihaileanu	
1998	Germany	Die Akte B. – Alois Brunner: Die Geschichte eines Massenmörders	Georg M. Hafner & Esther Schapira	
1999	Germany	Aimée & Jaguar	Max Färberböck	Based on a book of the same name by Erica Fischer
1999	Czech Republic	All My Loved Ones	Matej Mináč	
1999	United States	The Devil's Arithmetic	Donna Deitch	Based on the novel by Jane Yolen
1999	Germany	Gloomy Sunday	Rolf Schübel	Based on the novel by Nick Barkow
1999	United States	Jakob the Liar	Peter Kassovitz	Based on the novel by Jurek Becker
1999	Germany; Austria; Canada; Hungary	Sunshine	István Szabó	

== 2000s ==
Year	Country	Title	Directors	Notes
2000	Czech Republic	Musíme si pomáhat	Jan Hřebejk	English title: Divided We Fall
2000	Canada	Nuremberg	Yves Simoneau	TV movie; based on the book by Joseph E. Persico
2000	Czech Republic	Pramen života	Milan Cieslar	English title: The Spring Of Life; based on the book by Vladimír Körner
2000	United Kingdom	The Holocaust on Trial	Leslie Woodhead	A BBC dramatised documentary film into an investigation of Hitler's Final Solution together with a reconstruction of key courtroom exchanges in the libel case lost by the historian David Irving who was accused of being a Holocaust denier.
2000	United States; Poland	Edges of the Lord	Yurek Bogayevicz	
2001	Hungary	Hamvadó cigarettavég	Péter Bacsó	Title in English: Smoldering Cigarette. The film is a fictionalized portrayal of the Hungarian diva Katalin Karády's act of saving her Jewish lyricist György G. Denes from forced labor camp and connecting him with organized espionage against Nazi Germany.
2001	United States	Anne Frank: The Whole Story	Robert Dornhelm	TV movie; based on the book by Melissa Müller
2001	United States; United Kingdom	Conspiracy	Frank Pierson	TV movie
2001	United States	The Grey Zone	Tim Blake Nelson	Based on the book, about the Sonderkommando in Auschwitz
2001	Germany	Nirgendwo in Afrika	Caroline Link	English title: Nowhere in Africa; adaptation of Stefanie Zweig's autobiographical novel
2001	United States	Uprising	Jon Avnet	TV movie
2002	France; Germany	Amen.	Costa-Gavras	Based on the play The Deputy by Rolf Hochhuth
2002	France; Germany; United Kingdom; Poland	The Pianist	Roman Polanski	Based on the autobiography by Wladyslaw Szpilman about survival in the Warsaw Ghetto; won three Academy Awards
2002	Czech Republic	The Power of Good	Matej Mináč	Documentary
2003	Hungary	A Rózsa énekei	Andor Szilágyi	
2003	Italy	Facing Windows	Ferzan Özpetek	English title: Facing Windows
2003	United States	The Singing Forest	Jorge Ameer	
2003	United States	Out of the Ashes	Joseph Sargent	Based on the book I Was a Doctor in Auschwitz by Gisella Perl
2003	Germany	Babiy Yar	Jeff Kanew	
2004	Brazil	Olga	Jayme Monjardim	
2005	Poland; Sweden	Ninas resa	Lena Einhorn	
2005	France	A Love to Hide	Christian Faure	TV movie
2005	United States	Everything is Illuminated	Liev Schreiber	Based on the book by Jonathan Safran Foer. The film deals with the Holocaust in Ukraine and its impact and memory in contemporary Ukraine.
2005	United Kingdom	Primo	Richard Wilson	TV movie
2005	Germany	Sophie Scholl - Die letzten Tage	Marc Rothemund	English title: Sophie Scholl: The Final Days
2005	Hungary	Fateless	Lajos Koltai	Based on the book by Imre Kertész
2006	Netherlands	Black Book	Paul Verhoeven	
2006	Germany; Czech Republic	Der Letzte Zug	Joseph Vilsmaier/ Dana Vávrová	English title: The Last Train
2006	United States	Forgiving Dr. Mengele	Bob Hercules; Cheri Pugh	
2007	Germany	Spielzeugland	Jochen Alexander Freydank	English title: Toyland. Won the 2009 Best Live Action Short Film Oscar at the 81st Academy Awards.
2007	United Kingdom	The Relief of Belsen	Justin Hardy	Depicts events that unfolded at Bergen-Belsen concentration camp following the liberation of the camp by British troops in April 1945.
2007	Germany; Austria	The Counterfeiters	Stefan Ruzowitzky	Based on a memoir written by Adolf Burger; won the 2007 Best Foreign Language Film Oscar at the 80th Academy Awards.
2008	United Kingdom	God on Trial	Andy DeEmmony	
2008	United Kingdom; United States	The Boy in the Striped Pyjamas	Mark Herman	Adaptation of John Boyne's novel
2008	United States	Defiance	Edward Zwick	Based on the book by Nechama Tec; nomination for an Academy Award in the category of Best Original Score
2008	United Kingdom; United States	The Reader	Stephen Daldry	Based on the book by Bernhard Schlink; Kate Winslet won Academy Award For Best Actress
2008	Hungary; Germany; United Kingdom	Good	Vicente Amorim	Based on the play by Cecil Philip Taylor
2009	France	L'armée du crime	Robert Guédiguian	English title: The Army of Crime
2009	France	Korkoro	Tony Gatlif	The film depicts the subject of Porajmos.
2009	United States; Germany	Inglourious Basterds	Quentin Tarantino	Alternate history war comedy. Nominated for eight Academy Awards.
2009	United States; Poland; Canada	The Courageous Heart of Irena Sendler	John Kent Harrison	TV movie

== 2010s ==
Year	Country	Title	Directors	Notes
2010	United States; Poland	Esther's Diary	Mariusz Kotowski	Features original footage from the Auschwitz-Birkenau State Museum
2010	France	Sarah's Key	Gilles Paquet-Brenner	An adaptation of the novel Elle s'appelait Sarah by Tatiana De Rosnay
2010	Czech Republic; Austria; Germany	Habermann	Juraj Herz	Based on true events and is the first major motion picture to dramatize the expulsion of 3 million Germans from Czechoslovakia.
2010	France	The Round Up	Rose Bosch	The Vel' d'Hiv Roundup.
2010	China	A Jewish Girl in Shanghai	Wang Genfa, Zhang Zhenhui	Animated. Life of a Jewish girl with her little brother in Shanghai, and her parents in Europe.
2011	Poland	In Darkness	Agnieszka Holland	Nominated for Best Foreign Language Film at the 84th Academy Awards.
2011	Germany	Wunderkinder	Markus Rosenmüller	Story about deep friendship between three musically talented children.
2011	Spain	El ángel de Budapest	Luis Oliveros	The plot focuses on Ángel Sanz Briz, a Spanish ambassador in Hungary during World War II. Operating until early 1944 in Budapest, he helped to save the lives of thousands of Jews from the Holocaust.
2012	Poland	Aftermath	Wladyslaw Pasikowski	Aftermath (Polish: Pokłosie) - the fictional Holocaust-related thriller and drama is inspired by the July 1941 Jedwabne pogrom in occupied north-eastern Poland
2012	Netherlands	Süskind	Rudolf van den Berg	Based on the true story of Walter Süskind
2012	Macedonia	The Third Half	Darko Mitrevski	
2012	Serbia	When Day Breaks	Goran Paskaljević	
2013	Argentina	The German Doctor	Lucía Puenzo	Original title: Wakolda
2013	Germany	An Apartment in Berlin	Alice Agneskirchner	German TV film. The story of the family Adler living in Berlin, betrayed by Stella Goldschlag murdered in Auschwitz in 1944 and three young students moving from Israel to Berlin.
2013	Germany; Poland	Run Boy Run	Pepe Danquart	
2013	Switzerland	Akte Grüninger	Alain Gsponer	Based on the true story of Paul Grüninger.
2013	Czech Republic; Slovakia	Colette	Milan Cieslar	An adaptation of the novel A girl from Antwerp by Arnošt Lustig
2013	Poland; Denmark	Ida	Paweł Pawlikowski	Won Academy Award for Best Foreign Language Film at the 87th Academy Awards
2014	Poland	Warsaw 44	Jan Komasa	Original title Miasto '44
2014	Germany	Labyrinth of Lies	Giulio Ricciarelli	
2014	France	To Life	Jean-Jacques Silbermann	
2014	Germany	Phoenix	Christian Petzold	Loosely based on the 1961 novel Le Retour des Cendres by Hubert Monteilhet
2015	Germany	Naked Among Wolves	Philipp Kadelbach	
2015	Germany	The People vs. Fritz Bauer	Lars Kraume	
2015	Canada	Remember	Atom Egoyan	Won Best Original Screenplay at 4th Canadian Screen Awards
2015	Russia; Germany	The Way Out	Mikhail Uchitelev	Short. Accepted at the Short Film Corner of the 68th Cannes Festival
2015	Hungary	Son of Saul	László Nemes	Won Academy Award for Best Foreign Language Film at the 88th Academy Awards; Winner of the Grand Prix at the 2015 Cannes Film Festival; Winner of the Best Foreign Language Film Category at the 73rd Golden Globe Awards; Winner of Best International Film at the 31st Independent Spirit Awards
2015	Germany	Meine Tochter Anne Frank	Raymond Lay	German television film about Anne Frank, on the view of her father
2016	Germany	Das Tagebuch der Anne Frank	Hans Steinbichler	German cinematographic feature about Anne Frank
2016	United States	Denial	Mick Jackson	Adaptation of the book Denying the Holocaust
2017	United States; United Kingdom	The Zookeeper's Wife	Niki Caro	Adaptation of the novel The Zookeeper's Wife
2017	Hungary	1945	Ferenc Török	Winner of multiple international film awards
2017	United States	The Man with the Iron Heart	Cédric Jimenez	Based on French writer Laurent Binet's novel HHhH
2017	France	Un sac de billes	Christian Duguay	
2017	Israel; Austria	The Testament (Ha Edut)	Amichai Greenberg	
2018	Russia	Sobibor	Konstantin Khabensky	
2018	Germany	Never Look Away	Florian Henckel von Donnersmarck	
2018	United States	Operation Finale	Chris Weitz	Follows the efforts of Israeli intelligence officers to capture former SS officer Adolf Eichmann in 1960
2018	Philippines	Quezon's Game	Matthew Rose	Features Philippine President Manuel L. Quezon's plan to provide refuge for Jews fleeing from Nazi Germany.
2018	Spain	The Photographer of Mauthausen	Mar Targarona	Story of Francisco Boix and his covert documentation of life at Mauthausen Concentration Camp
2018	Poland; Germany; Netherlands	Werewolf	Adrian Panek	
2018	United States	The Samuel Project	Marc Fusco	
2018	Germany	Transit	Christian Petzold	Adaptation of the novel Transit by Anna Seghers
2019	United States	Jojo Rabbit	Taika Waititi	Adaptation of the novel Caging Skies by Christine Leunens
2019	Canada Hungary	The Song of Names	François Girard	Adaptation of the novel The Song of Names by Norman Lebrecht

== 2020s ==
Year	Country	Title	Directors	Notes
2020	United States; United Kingdom Germany	Resistance	Jonathan Jakubowicz	Inspired by the life of Marcel Marceau
2020	United States	My Name is Sara	Steven Oritt	
2020	Norway	Betrayed	Eirik Svensson	A Norwegian drama film based on the true story of the Norwegian boxer Charles Braude and his family being persecuted, arrested and murdered by the Nazis during World War II with the collaboration of the Norwegian government as a plan to exterminate all Jews in Europe.
2020	United States	The Secrets We Keep	Yuval Adler	A Roma Holocaust survivor, Maja, struggles with PTSD and survivor's guilt in the 1950s. She encounters a man, whom she recognizes as a German soldier, who had raped her 15 years earlier, and been involved in the murder of her sister.
2020	Poland	The Champion	Maciej Barczewski	The film stars Piotr Głowacki as Tadeusz Pietrzykowski, a real-life Polish boxer who became famous for his nearly undefeated strings of victories in the Nazi concentration camps.
2021	Belgium, France, Israel, Luxembourg, Netherlands	Where Is Anne Frank	Ari Folman	In the animated magic realism film, Kitty-Anne Frank's imaginary friend to whom she addressed her diary-comes to life and explores 21st century Netherlands to learn about her creator's fate in the Holocaust, noticing the similarities between the persecuted Jews of WWII and refugees seeking asylum in modern-day Europe.
2021	Canada, Belgium, France	Charlotte	Éric Warin, Tahir Rana	Animated. Based on the true story of German-Jewish painter Charlotte Salomon.
2021	Serbia	Dara of Jasenovac	Predrag Antonijević	It is the first modern production on the subject of the Jasenovac concentration camp.
2021	Slovakia	The Auschwitz Report	Peter Bebjak	Two prisoners in the Auschwitz concentration camp manage to escape with a document about the camp's operation
2021	Israel	Holy Holocaust	Noa Berman-Herzberg, Osi Wald	In her autobiographical animated short film, a Jewish Israeli woman named Noa Berman-Herzberg narrates of her friendship with Jenny Teege, the Black German granddaughter of Nazi commander Amon Goeth and bestselling author of My Grandfather Would Have Shot Me.
2021	Italy	L'equilibrista con la stella	Davide Campagna	Film set in North Italy: A Jewish girl falls in love with a young Clown, who hides her from Nazis in his circus and teaches her to be tightrope walker.
2021	USA, Canada, Hungary	The Survivor	Barry Levinson	Based on the story of Harry Haft - the boxer in Auschwitz
2021	France, Belgium	Valiant Hearts	Mona Achache	In 1942 six Jewish children are hidden by the French Resistance in the Chambord Castle to escape the Holocaust.
2022	Germany	The Conference	Matti Geschonneck	After Die Wannseekonferenz (1984) and Conspiracy (2001), this is the third television film depiction of the Wannsee Conference.
2023	Ukraine	Shttl	Ady Walter	The film depicts the lives of a shtetl in Western Ukraine on the eve of Operation Barbarossa.
2023	Italy	L'ultima volta che siamo stati bambini	Claudio Bisio	Italian dramedy road movie about kids who go for a long journey in 1943 to find their friend deported to Auschwitz.
2023	United States	A Small Light	Susanna Fogel, Tony Phelan, Leslie Hope	TV mini-series about Miep Gies, a Dutch woman who risked her life to shelter Anne Frank's family from the Nazis. Nominated for multiple awards, including a Primetime Emmy Award.
2023	United Kingdom	One Life	James Hawes	It is based on the true story of British humanitarian Sir Nicholas Winton as he looks back on his past efforts to help groups of Jewish children in German-occupied Czechoslovakia to hide and flee in 1938–39, just before the beginning of World War II.
2023	United Kingdom, Germany, Poland	The Zone of Interest	Jonathan Glazer	A loose adaptation of Martin Amis' 2014 novel of the same name, detailing the domestic life of Auschwitz commandant Rudolf Höss and his family. Won the Grand Prix at the 2023 Cannes Film Festival and the 2024 Academy Award for Best International Feature Film on behalf of the United Kingdom.
2024	United States, United Kingdom, Hungary	The Brutalist	Brady Corbet	It tells the story of fictional Hungarian brutalist architect László Tóth (Adrien Brody), who immigrates to America after World War II. Over the course of the film, it's revealed that he was interned at Buchenwald, and its buildings would go on to influence his designs. Won the Silver Lion at the 2024 Venice Film Festival, 3 Academy Awards including Best Actor for Adrien Brody, and 3 Golden Globes, including Best Picture (Drama).
2024	Netherlands, United States	The Ice Cream Man	Robert Moniot	Short film that stars Noah Emmerich as Ernst Cahn, a popular Jewish ice cream parlor owner, who, shortly after the Nazi invasion of the Netherlands, finds himself targeted by the infamous “Butcher of Lyon,” Klaus Barbie. Shortlisted for Best Live Action Short Film at the upcoming 97th Academy Awards.
2024	Israel	The Ring	Adir Miller, Doron Paz, Yoav Paz	Based on Adir Miller's own family story of Holocaust survival and generational trauma, set to a trip throughout Budapest to retrieve a titular piece of jewelry taken from his mother during World War II.
2025	United States	Bau: Artist at War	Sean McNamara	Based on the true love story of artist Joseph and Rebecca Bau, whose wedding took place in the Plaszow concentration camp during World War II.
2025	United States, United Kingdom, Bulgaria, Israel	The World Will Tremble	Lior Geller	Based on the true story of the escape of Chełmno extermination camp during World War II by Michael Podchlebnik and Szlama Ber Winer

== Documentary films ==
=== 1940s ===
Year	Country	Title	Director	Notes
1945	United Kingdom	German Concentration Camps Factual Survey	production supervised by Sidney Bernstein	Long shelved, completed in 2014; Alfred Hitchcock collaborated on production
1945	United States	Death Mills	Billy Wilder	English Version of Die Todesmühlen; excerpted from German Concentration Camps Factual Survey
1945	Poland	Majdanek - cmentarzysko Europy	Aleksander Ford	English title: Majdanek: Cemetery of Europe
1945	United States	Nazi Concentration Camps	George Stevens	Presented as evidence at the Nuremberg trials.
1945	United States	The Nazi Plan	George Stevens	Presented as evidence at the Nuremberg trials
1945	Yugoslavia	Jasenovac	Gustav Gavrin & Kosta Hlavaty	
circa 1946	United Kingdom	Memory of the Camps	original documentary supervised by Sidney Bernstein	Shorter version of German Concentration Camps Factual Survey; reconstructed by American PBS series Frontline in 1984
1946	United States	Seeds of Destiny	Gene Fowler Jr.	Shows devastation and solicits relief funds
1946	France	Nous Continuons		English Title: We Live Again. Deals with child survivors. In Yiddish.
1947	Soviet Union	The Nuremberg Trials	Yelizaveta Svilova	Soviet view of the Nuremberg Trials

=== 1950s ===
Year	Country	Title	Director	Notes
1956	France	Nuit et brouillard	Alain Resnais	English title: Night and Fog. Written by Jean Cayrol, an escapee of Mauthausen. Music by Hanns Eisler.

=== 1960s ===
Year	Country	Title	Director	Notes
1960	West Germany; Sweden	Mein Kampf	Erwin Leiser	Swedish title: Den Blodiga tiden
1963	West Germany	Chronik eines Mordes	Joachim Hasler	
1965	West Germany	Der Vorletzte Akt	Walter Krüttner	English title: Last Act But One: Brundibar
1965	Canada	Memorandum	Donald Brittain and John Spotton	French title: Pour mémoire
1965	Soviet Union	Obyknovennyy fashizm	Mikhail Romm	English title: Ordinary Fascism
1966	United Kingdom	Warsaw Ghetto		
1967	Denmark	Mordere iblandt os (TV)	Henning Knudsen	English title: Murderers Among Us
1968	United States	The Rise and Fall of the Third Reich	Jack Kaufman	Based on William L. Shirer book The Rise and Fall of the Third Reich
1968	Poland	Archeology	Andrzej Brzozowski	
1969	France; Switzerland; West Germany	Le Chagrin et la pitié	Marcel Ophüls	English title: The Sorrow and the Pity. Vichy France government collaboration with Nazi Germany during the war.

=== 1970s ===
Year	Country	Title	Director	Notes
1970	Netherlands	Dingen die niet voorbijgaan	Philo Bregstein	English title: The Past that Lives
1972	West Germany	Mendel Schainfelds zweite Reise nach Deutschland	Hans-Dieter Grabe	
1974	Israel	The 81st Blow	David Bergman, Jacques Ehrlich and Haim Gouri	English title: The 81st Blow
1974	United Kingdom	The World at War (TV)	Michael Darlow	Episode 20, "Genocide" (First broadcast 27 March 1974). The Final Solution (Parts One & Two).
1976	United Kingdom; United States; France; West Germany	The Memory of Justice	Marcel Ophüls	4.6 hours long. Won Los Angeles Film Critics Special Award.
1977	West Germany	Reinhard Heydrich - Manager des Terrors	Heinz Schirk	
1979	United Kingdom	Kitty: Return to Auschwitz	Peter Morley	Kitty Hart-Moxon returns to Auschwitz concentration camp

=== 1980s ===
Year	Country	Title	Director	Notes
1980	West Germany	Der Gelbe Stern	Dieter Hildebrandt	English title: The Yellow Star
1981	Australia	The Hunter and the Hunted	John Oakley	
1982	United States	Genocide	Arnold Schwartzman	Best Documentary Feature Oscar winner
1982	Sweden	The Story of Chaim Rumkowski and the Jews of Lodz	Peter Cohen and Bo Kuritzen	
1982	United States	Who Shall Live and Who Shall Die	Laurence Jarvik	Distributed by Kino International Corporation
1983	United States	To Bear Witness	Gavin P. Boyle	
1983	United Kingdom	Schindler: The Documentary (TV)	Jon Blair	Released in the US in 1994 as Schindler: The Real Story
1983	United States	The Work	Bernard Offen	
1984	United States	A Generation Apart	Jack Fisher	
1984	United States	Kaddish	Steve Brand	Based on book by Dr. Randolph Braham
1985	Canada	Dark Lullabies	Irene Lilienheim Angelico and Abbey Jack Neidik	Feature documentary
1985	Soviet Union	Babiy Yar: Lessons of History		
1985	West Germany	Die Befreiung von Auschwitz	Irmgard von zur Mühlen	English title: Liberation of Auschwitz 1945
1985	West Germany	Goethe in D.	Manfred Vosz	
1985	France	Shoah	Claude Lanzmann	9.5 hours long
1985	United States	Say I'm a Jew	Pier Marton	Jewish identity for Second Generation European Jews
1985	United States	The Ties That Bind	Su Friedrich	
1986	Australia	Paradise Camp	Frank Heimans	Concerns the Theresienstadt concentration camp
1986	United States	Partisans of Vilna	Joshua Waletzky	Documentary produced by Aviva Kempner about the Jewish resistance in the Vilna Ghetto.
1986	West Germany	Die Befreiung von Auschwitz	Bengt von zur Mühlen	
1988	Israel	B'Glal Hamilhamah Hahi	Orna Ben-Dor Niv	English title: Because of That War
1988	United States; France	Hôtel Terminus: Klaus Barbie, sa vie et son temps	Marcel Ophüls	English title: Hôtel Terminus: The Life and Times of Klaus Barbie
1988	West Germany	Mit 22 Jahren wollte man noch nicht sterben	Rainer Ritzel	
1988	France; Poland	Témoins	Marcel Lozinski	Polish title: Swiadkowie; English title: Witnesses: Anti-Semitism in Poland, 1946
1988	United States	Voices from the Attic	Debbie Goodstein	
1989	Israel	Hugo	Yair Lev	
1989	United States	Lodz Ghetto	Alan Adelson & Kate Taverna	
1989	Sweden	The Architecture of Doom	Peter Cohen	English title: The Architecture of Doom
1989	United States	Yad Vashem: Preserving the Past to Ensure the Future	Ray Errol Fox	

=== 1990s ===
Year	Country	Title	Director	Notes
1990	United States	C.A.N.D.L.E.S.: The Story of the Mengele Twins (TV)	Gordon J. Murray	
1991	France	Premier convoi (TV)	Jacky Assoun and Suzette Bloch	
1991	United Kingdom	Purple Triangles	Martin Smith	Describes the accounts of Jehovah's Witnesses in Nazi camps.
1991	United Kingdom	Chasing Shadows	Naomi Gryn	About the childhood experiences of Holocaust survivor Rabbi Hugo Gryn.
1991	Canada	A Day in the Warsaw Ghetto: A Birthday Trip in Hell	Jack Kuper	Based on the diaries of Warsaw ghetto inmates
1991	United States	They Risked Their Lives: Rescuers of the Holocaust	Gay Block	
1992	United States	Sequel to Lódz Ghetto	Alan Adelson	
1992	Poland	Miejsce urodzenia	Paweł Łoziński	English title: Birthplace
1992	France	La Rafle du Vel-d'Hiv, La Marche du siècle	William Karel	
1992	Japan	The Visas That Saved Lives	Alan Adelson	
1992	Sweden	Återkomster	Joanna Helander and Bo Persson	
1993	Canada	Children of the Shadows	Marc Cukier	
1994	Israel; Germany	Balagan	Andres Veiel	Based on the play Arbeit macht frei by Smadar Jaaron and David Maayan
1994	United States	Diamonds in the Snow	Mira Reym Binford	
1994	United States	Choosing One's Way: Resistance in Auschwitz/Birkenau	Ted Kay and Allen Secher	
1994	United States	The Holocaust: In Memory of Millions (TV)	Brian Blake	Hosted by Walter Cronkite
1994	Austria	Die Kunst des Erinnerns - Simon Wiesenthal	Johanna Heer and Werner Schmiedel	English title: The Art of Remembrance - Simon Wiesenthal
1994	Spain; Argentina	La Memoria del agua	Héctor Fáver	English title: Memory of Water
1994	Unknown	The Power of Conscience: The Danish Resistance and the Rescue of the Jews	Alexandra Isles	
1994	France; Switzerland	Tzedek	Marek Halter	
1994	Finland	Vankileirien paratiisi	Lisa Hovinheimo	
1995	United States; United Kingdom; Netherlands	Anne Frank Remembered (TV)	Jon Blair	
1995	Israel	Bottles in the Cellar	Shmuel Imberman	
1995	United States	Children Remember the Holocaust (TV)	Mark Gordon	Hosted by Keanu Reeves
1995	United States	One Survivor Remembers (TV)	Kary Antholis	
1995	Israel	Reshimot Vanda (TV)	Vered Berman	
1995	Belgium	Rhodes nostalgie (TV)	Diane Perelsztejn	
1996	France	Drancy Avenir	Arnaud des Pallières	Deportations from Paris
1996	United States	My Knees Were Jumping: Remembering the Kindertransports	Melissa Hacker	
1996	United Kingdom	Nuremberg	Stephen Trombley	
1996	United States	Survivors of the Holocaust	Allan Holzman	
1996	United Kingdom	The Nazis: A Warning from History	Laurence Rees and Tilman Remme	
1996	Germany	Hitler's Henchmen	Guido Knopp, Sebastian Dehnhardt, Jörg Müllner, Andreas Christoph Schmidt	TV Mini-series, 2 seasons, 12 episodes
1997	Denmark; United Kingdom; Germany	The Island on Bird Street	Søren Kragh-Jacobsen	Based on the book by Uri Orlev
1997	United States	Blood Money: Switzerland's Nazi Gold	Stephen Crisman	
1997	Switzerland	Grüningers Fall	Richard Dindo	Based on the book by Stefan Keller
1997	United States	My Hometown Concentration Camp	Bernard Offen	
1997	United States	In the Shadow of the Reich: Nazi Medicine	John Michalczyk	Based on the book by Stefan Keller
1997	Switzerland	Journal de Rivesaltes 1941–1942	Jacqueline Veuve	
1997	United States	The Long Way Home	Mark Jonathan Harris	Narrated by Morgan Freeman
1997	United States	The Lost Children of Berlin	Elizabeth McIntyre	Narrated by Anthony Hopkins
1997	United States	Out Loud!	Miriam Bjeirre	
1997	Germany	Das Prinzip Dora	Claudette Coulanges & Rolf Coulanges	
1997	United States	Raising the Ashes	Michael O'Keefe	
1997	Israel; Czech Republic	Shahor Lavan Zeh Tzivoni	Tamir Paul	
1997	United States	The Trial of Adolf Eichmann		Describes the time period of Adolf Eichmann from his being brought to Israel till his execution. Also an insight is given into the mind of the mass murderer.
1997	France; Germany	Un vivant qui passe	Claude Lanzmann	English title: A Visitor from the Living
1997	Germany	Unterwegs als sicherer Ort	Dietrich Schubert	English title On the Move Is a Safe Place
1997	Italy	Memoria	Ruggero Gabbai	Selected for the "Berlin International Film Festival". Collection of about ninety eyewitnesses' interviews, the voices of the Italian survivors of the Shoah.
1998	Germany; Czech Republic	Diese Tage in Terezin	Sibylle Schönemann	English title: Those Days in Terezin
1998	Germany; France; Poland	Fotoamator	Dariusz Jablonski	English title: Photographer; French title: Chronique couleur du ghetto de Łódź; German title: Der Fotograf
1998	United States	The Last Days	James Moll	Won Academy Award for Documentary Feature
1998	United States	A Letter Without Words	Lisa Lewenz	
1998	Belgium	Der Judenmord	Michel Alexandre	
1998	Switzerland	Nachrichten aus dem Untergrund	Andreas Hoessli	English title Underground Messengers
1998	United States	Never Forget	Sherrie Drummond	Short
1998	United States	A Sculpture of Love and Anguish: The Miami Beach Holocaust Memorial	David Braman	
1999	United States	Burning Questions	Michael Porembski	
1999	United States	The Children of Chabannes	Lisa Gossels	
1999	Switzerland	Children of the Night	Jolanta Dylewska	
1999	United States	Eyewitness	Bert Van Bork	
1999	Germany	Flucht in den Dschungel	Michael Juncker	
1999	Canada	Hidden Heroes	Karen Pascal	
1999	Switzerland; Israel	Martin	Ra'anan Alexandrowicz	
1999	Germany	Mendel lebt – Wiederbegegnung mit Mendel Szajnfeld	Hans-Dieter Grabe	
1999	United States; United Kingdom	Mr. Death: The Rise and Fall of Fred A. Leuchter, Jr.	Errol Morris	
1999	United States	Process B-7815	Bernard Offen	
1999	United States	Tak for Alt: Survival of a Human Spirit	Laura Bialis & Broderick Fox & Sarah Levy	
1999	Israel; France; Germany; Belgium; Austria	Un spécialiste, portrait d'un criminel moderne	Eyal Sivan	Documentary film directed by Rony Brauman and Eyal Sivan, originally released in 1999 to theaters worldwide. Made entirely out of the restored original video recordings of Adolf Eichmann's trial at Jerusalem edited down to 120 minutes, the film focuses especially on the desk murderer's psychology. No narration or commentary is used, albeit the material is at times edited visually and acoustically to disturbing effect, to reflect the most disturbing nature of the events related in the words of the witnesses, the court, and the defendant, and scored with disturbing musique concrete or ambient music. Official Selection of the 1999 Berlin International Film Festival, winner of the Grimme-Preis in 2001. Was criticized for tendentious editing making Eichmann appear in a more positive light and especially making prosecutor Gideon Hausner appear to display rude and unfair behavior in court, by Stewart Tryster, director of the Steven Spielberg Jewish Film Archive, in his 2005 documentary Editing the Truth Away: The Eichmann Trial and The Specialist . Released on French VHS and DVD under its original title, on NTSC VHS as Adolf Eichmann: The Specialist, on Region 1 DVD as The Specialist: Portrait of a Modern Criminal, and on German VHS as Ein Spezialist. All of these home video editions are currently out-of-print.
1999	United States	Witness: Voices from the Holocaust	Joshua M. Greene & Shiva Kumar	
1999	Germany	Drei deutsche Mörder. Aufzeichnungen über die Banalität des Bösen	Ebbo Demant	
1999	Poland	... gdzie jest mój starszy syn Kain	Agnieszka Arnold	Considers Jedwabne pogrom

=== 2000s ===
Year	Country	Title	Director	Notes
2000	United Kingdom	Auschwitz: The Final Witnesses	Sheldon Lazarus	
2000	Spain	Cerca del Danubio	Felipe Vega	
2000	United States	Fighter	Amir Bar-Lev	
2000	United States	Typhoons' Last Storm	Lawrence Bond	
2000	Israel	Hazehut Ha'Avuda Shel Hanita	Vered Berman	
2000	United Kingdom	The Holocaust on Trial	Leslie Woodhead	
2000	United Kingdom; United States	Into the Arms of Strangers: Stories of the Kindertransport	Mark Jonathan Harris	
2000	United States	Paragraph 175	Rob Epstein and Jeffrey Friedman	Documentary about gays and the Holocaust
2000	Israel	Reshimat Ahava	David Fisher	
2000	Germany	Das Himmler-Projekt	Romuald Karmakar	
2001	United States	Exodus to Berlin	Jeff Kamen and Peter Laufer	
2001	United States	Holocaust: New York Tolerance Center	Scott Goldstein	
2001	Germany	Eine Liebe in Auschwitz	Thilo Thielke & Jens Nicolai	
2001	Poland	Śmierć Zygelbojma	Dżamila Ankiewicz	
2001	Poland	Sąsiedzi	Agnieszka Arnold	Concerns Jedwabne pogrom
2001	France	Sobibor, 14 octobre 1943, 16 heures	Claude Lanzmann	English title: Sobibor, Oct. 14, 1943, 4 p.m.
2001	Canada	Struma	Radu Gabrea	
2001	Slovakia	Svedok	Dušan Hudec	
2002		Illusion		Concerns Kurt Gerron
2002	United States	Last Dance	Mirra Bank	
2002	United States	Secret Lives: Hidden Children and Their Rescuers During WWII	Aviva Slesin	
2002	Czech Republic	They're Painful Memories (...to jsou těžké vzpomínky)	Monika Rychlíková	About holocaust of Roma and Sinti in the Protectorate of Bohemia and Moravia. Camps in Lety and Hodonín.
2002	Poland	Pamiętam	Marcel Lozinski	English title: I Remember
2002	United States; Canada; Germany; United Kingdom	Prisoner of Paradise	Malcolm Clarke & Stuart Sender	
2002	United States	Sudbina mi nije dala da odem	Dominik Sedlar & Jakov Sedlar	English title: Fate Did Not Let Me Go
2002	Canada	Undying Love	Helene Klodawsky	
2003	United States	Berga: Soldiers of Another War	Charles Guggenheim	
2003	United States; Denmark	Den Danske løsning	Karen Cantor & Camilla Kjærulff	English title: The Danish Solution: The Rescue of the Jews in Denmark
2003	Australia	Long Shadows: Stories from a Jewish Home	Kate Hampel	
2003	United States	Luboml: My Heart Remembers	Eileen Douglas & Ron Steinman	
2003	Germany	Mariannes Heimkehr	Stefan Röttger & Gert Monheim	
2003	Germany	Land der Vernichtung	Romuald Karmakar	
2004	United States	A is for Auschwitz: A Weekend with My Grandparents		
2004	Canada	Against the Odds	Jedrzej Jonasz	
2004	United States	Imaginary Witness: Hollywood and the Holocaust	Daniel Anker	
2004	Poland	Hawaii and the Holocaust	Bernard Offen	
2004	United States	Paper Clips	Elliot Berlin & Joe Fab	About the Paper Clips Project
2004	Italy	La fuga degli innocenti	Leone Pompucci	
2004	Germany	Wege der Tübinger Juden. Eine Spurensuche	Ulrike Baumgärtner	
2004	United Kingdom	Auschwitz: The Nazis and the 'Final Solution' Also known as Auschwitz: Inside the Nazi State	Dominic Sutherland, Martina Balazova and Detlef Siebert	Companion book: Auschwitz: A New History
2004	Germany; Luxembourg; Czech Republic	The Ninth Day	Volker Schlöndorff	Based on a portion of Pfarrerblock 25487 (ISBN 2-87963-286-2), the diary of Father Jean (1907–1994)
2005	Chile	Holocausto:Tercera Generación	Daniel Segal & Daniel Halpern	
2005	Germany	Mit dem Mut der Verzweifelten – Jüdischer Widerstand gegen Hitler	Rena Giefer & Thomas Giefer	
2005	Germany; Slovakia	2 oder 3 Dinge, die ich von ihm weiß	Malte Ludin	English title: 2 or 3 Things I Know About Him — Ludin's family's reaction to their father's role in sending Jews to Auschwitz
2005	Hungary	Process (TV)	Péter Muszatics	
2005	Israel	A Treasure in Auschwitz (TV)	Yahaly Gat	
2005	Germany	Wenn lang die Bilder schon verblassen... KZ Theresienstadt - Propagandafilm und Wirklichkeit	Thilo Pohle	
2005	Germany	Winterkinder - Die schweigende Generation	Jens Schanze	
2005	Hungary	Sorstalanság (Fateless)	Lajos Koltai	
2006	France	Amants des hommes	Isabelle Darmengeat	English title: Men lovers
2006	France	Nuremberg: The Nazis Facing their Crimes	Christian Delage	
2006	Canada	Once a Nazi...	Frederic Bohbot & Evan Beloff	
2006	Netherlands	Black Book	Paul Verhoeven	
2006	United States	Borrowing Time	Robert Allan Black	
2006	United States	Journey to Justice	Steve Palackdharry	
2006	United States	Knocking	Joel Engardio and Tom Shepard	
2006	Italy	La Strada di Levi	Davide Ferrario	
2006	Germany	Der letzte Zug	Joseph Vilsmaier, Dana Vávrová	
2006	Austria; Germany	The Counterfeiters	Stefan Ruzowitzky	
2006	Poland	The Portraitist (Portrecista)	Ireneusz Dobrowolski	Polish television documentary film about the life and work of Wilhelm Brasse, the famous "photographer of Auschwitz"
2006	United Kingdom	Kz	Rex Bloomstein	Documents the attitudes and experiences of tourists and students visiting Mauthausen concentration camp, their guides, and the townspeople of Mauthausen.
2007-2010	Czech Republic	Forgotten transports	Lukáš Přibyl	Forgotten Transports to Estonia (2007), 85 min. Forgotten Transports to Latvia (2007), 85 min. Forgotten Transports to Belarus (2008), 85 min. Forgotten Transports to Poland (2010), 85 min.
2008	Israel	Classmates of Anne Frank	Eyal Boers	
2008	United States	Scrapbooks from Hell: The Auschwitz Albums	Erik Nelson	
2008	Poland	Anioł Śmierci (The Angel of Death)	Marta Mironowicz	Documentary on Josef Mengele's experiments.
2008	Germany	Gerdas Schweigen	Britta Wauer	
2009	Israel	Defamation	Yoav Shamir	
2009	France	Einsatzgruppen, les commandos de la mort (Nazi Death Squads)	Michaël Prazan	4x55 min.
2009	United Kingdom	The Secret Diary of the Holocaust	Alexander Marengo	Rutka Laskier's diary
2009	France	Das Reich, Hitler's death squads	Michaël Prazan	
2009	Germany	Der weiße Rabe – Max Mannheimer	Carolin Otto	

=== 2010s ===
Year	Country	Title	Director	Notes
2010	Canada	Song of the Lodz Ghetto	David Kaufman	
2010	Israel; Germany	A Film Unfinished	Yael Hersonski	
2010	Canada Brazil	Nazi Hunters	Tim Wolochatiuk	TV Mini-series, 13 episodes
2010	France	Le Rapport Karski	Claude Lanzmann	An extended interview with Polish resistance fighter Jan Karski, consisting largely of footage gathered for but not included in Claude Lanzmann's epic 9-hour documentary Shoah.
2011	Germany	Auschwitz	Uwe Boll	
2011	Israel; Germany	The Flat	Arnon Goldfinger	
2011	Turkey	Turkish Passport	Burak Arlıel	A documentary about the Jews who were rescued by Turkish diplomats through having been given Turkish diplomatic passports.
2011	Israel; Germany	Hitler's Children	Chanoch Zeevi	
2011	United States; Poland; Bulgaria; Israel; Germany	Empty Boxcars	Ed Gaffney	Tells the story of the survival of over 50,000 Jews in World War II and the mass murder of 11,393 Jews from territories under Bulgarian control in Greece and Macedonia. Footage of the trains renders the crime visible.
2012	Austria	Dann bin ich ja ein Mörder	Walter Manoschek	The subject of the film is Adolf Storms and the Deutsch Schützen massacre
2012	United States	Bearing Witness: The Voices of Our Survivors	Heather Elliott-Famularo	http://www.bearingwitnesstoledo.com
2012	United States	Misa's Fugue	Sean Gaston	www.misasfugue.com
2012	Germany	204 AR-Z 269/60Y Die Protokolle	Wolfgang Jost & Winfried Wallat	
2012	United States	No Place on Earth	Janet Tobias	Documentary about a group of Jews who lived in caves in Ukraine for nearly 18 months to escape the Holocaust.
2012	United States	REFUGE: Stories of the Selfhelp Home	Ethan Bensinger	Documentary about the last generation of Holocaust Survivors and Refugees at Chicago's Selfhelp Home
2012	United States	The Resort	Galina Kalashnikova	www.codeoflifeproductions.com
2012	Netherlands; Belgium; United States	Transport XX to Auschwitz	Karen Lynne & Richard Bloom	
2012	United States	Hiding Halina	Jeff MacIntyre	9 out of 10 Jewish children perished during the Holocaust. Those who survived were hidden. "Hiding Halina" is a documentary about a little girl who beat the odds.
2013	Austria; Germany	Das Radikal Böse	Stefan Ruzowitzky	
2013	United Kingdom	The Unseen Holocaust	Mike Ibeji	
2013	Canada; United States; United Kingdom	The Lady in Number 6	Malcolm Clarke	
2013	United Kingdom	Auschwitz: Journey Into Hell	Toby Groom	
2013	Italy	The Longest Journey	Ruggero Gabbai	A documentary about the last days of the Jews of Rhodes.
2013	France	Last of the Unjust	Claude Lanzmann	https://web.archive.org/web/20121028182739/http://www.le-pacte.com/international/upcoming-films/single/the-last-of-the-unjust/
2014	Poland	Warsaw Uprising	Jan Komasa	Documentary film using archived and colorized footage of Warsaw Uprising. Polish title: Powstanie Warszawskie
2014	France	Izieu, Children in the Shoah	Romain Icard	
2014	France	Jusqu'au dernier, La destruction des Juifs d'Europe	William Karel, Blanche Finger	8 episodes x 52 minutes English title: Annihilation - The Destruction of Europe's Jews
2014	Germany	Forbidden Films	Felix Moeller	Between 1933 and 1945, 1200 feature films were made in Germany. After the war the Allies banned over 300 films as propaganda. There are still restrictions on over 40 of these films today.
2014	United States	Berlin Calling	Nigel Dick	A punk fan from Los Angeles traces her father's journey back to the concentration camp in Theresienstadt where he spent two years of his life.
2014	Israel; Germany	Farewell Herr Schwarz	Yael Reuveny	An Israeli woman living in Germany, granddaughter of a survivor, explores the ramifications of discovering a great-uncle who, unbeknownst to the family in Israel, lived out his life in East Germany near the camp he was held in.
2014	United Kingdom	Night Will Fall	Andre Singer	
2014	Germany; Austria; Israel	The Decent One	Vanessa Lapa	
2014	France	Shoah, les Oubliés de l’Histoire	Véronique Lagoarde-Ségot	
2014	Israel; Czech Republic; Slovakia; United States	Gisi	Natasha Dudinski	The story of Gisi Fleischmann, a woman who believed she could stop the Holocaust if only she managed to raise enough money.
2015	United Kingdom	What Our Fathers Did: A Nazi Legacy	David Evans	
2016	Germany	Austerlitz	Sergei Loznitsa	Documentary showing how tourists act while visiting the Sachsenhausen and Dachau concentration camps.
2017	Israel	Ghetto Uprising - The Untold Story	Yuval Haimovich-Zuser	A film revolving around the Warsaw Ghetto uprising.
2017	France	Josef Mengele: Hunting A Nazi Criminal	Emmanuel Amara	
2017	Israel	Dear Fredy	Rubi Gat	Documentary about Fredy Hirsch, a German Jew and openly gay man in Nazi Germany. The film combines interviews, archival materials, and animation.
2017	United States	The Zookeeper's Wife		
2018	United States	The Number on Great-Grandpa's Arm	Amy Schatz	The film features a conversation between a ten year old and his Grandfather, a Holocaust survivor.
2018	United States	Who Will Write Our History	Roberta Grossman	
2018	Germany	Der Letzte Jollyboy	Hans-Erich Viet	
2018	United States	Operation Finale	Chris Weitz	Dramatization of Mossad's clandestine operation to kidnap Adolf Eichmann from Argentina for his trial in Jerusalem.
2018	Canada	The Accountant of Auschwitz	Matthew Shoychet	The trial of Oskar Gröning, who worked as accountant in Auschwitz. In his old age he exposed his participation in stealing the victim's valuables, and was convicted as an accessory to the murder of at least 300,000 Jews.
2018	South Africa	The Secret Survivor	Johnathan Andrews	After nearly 70 years of silence, Veronica Phillips, a survivor of Ravensbrück, decides to tell her story for future generations to learn from her tragic experiences during and after the Holocaust.
2019	Hungary	A Pásztor	László Illés	English title: The Shepherd. The main character is an old shepherd, who lives alone on a ranch. After his daughter was killed by Nazis, he decided in his grief to save as many Jewish lives as possible.
2019	Israel Germany	Made in Auschwitz: The Untold Story of Block 10	Sylvia Nagel, Sonya Winterberg	The story of the over 400 young women who underwent medical experimentation in Block 10 in Auschwitz under Carl Clauberg, an enterprising, sadistic gynaecologist.
2019	Germany	Free State Midpoint	Kai Ehlers & Domenico Distilo	The film reports from a chapter of the Nazi regime - eugenics - that has not been covered extensively from a subjective perspective, due to a lack of eloquent witnesses and a forum for their few voices.
2019	United States	No Asylum: The Untold Chapter of Anne Frank's Story	Paula Fouce	The discovery of the lost letters of Anne Frank's father, Otto, reveal an unknown chapter of their family's life.

=== 2020s ===
Year	Country	Title	Directors	Notes
2020	Germany	Getrennt durch Stacheldraht – Jugendjahre im KZ Gusen	Julia & Robert Grantner	
2020	United Kingdom	Final Account	Luke Holland	
2020	France	Ravensbrück, le camp oublié	Aurélie Chaigneau	
2020	Israel	Ahava Zot Lo Hayta (Love It Was Not)	Maya Sarfaty	The tragic love story of Helena Citron, a young Jewish prisoner in Auschwitz, and Austrian SS officer Franz Wunsch
2020	Japan	Inferno: Letters from Auschwitz		Documentary about notes which were written by Jews who were part of a special unit called the Sonderkommando
2020	United Kingdom	Route to Paradise	Thomas Gardner	
2021	Netherlands	Greetings from the death camp	Manfred Van Eijk	
2021	Israel	Bad Nazi. Good Nazi	Chanoch Ze'evi	
2021	France	From Where They Stood	Christophe Cognet	
2022	Germany	The Wannsee Conference: The Documentary	Jörg Müllner	
2022	United States	The U.S. and the Holocaust	Ken Burns, Lynn Novick, Sarah Botstein	
2022	United States, Germany	Ordinary Men: The Forgotten Holocaust	Manfred Oldenburg, Oliver Halmburger	Netflix documentary that examines how and why thousands of ordinary Germans carried out mass atrocities as members of Nazi police squads during the Holocaust.
2022	Tarłów, Poland	Without the Right to Live	Waldemar Kowalsk	Presented by Muzeum II Wojny Światowej w Gdańsku (World War II Museum in Gdansk). Released exactly 80 years after Operation Reinhard

== See also ==
- List of World War II films
- List of films made in the Third Reich
- List of Allied propaganda films of World War II
- Imaginary Witness: Hollywood and the Holocaust
