= Mináč =

Mináč, feminine: Mináčová is a Slovak surname. Notable people with the surname include:

- Ján Mináč
- Matej Mináč
- Vladimír Mináč (1922–1996), Slovak writer, screenwriter and politician
- Zuzana Mináčová (born 1931), Slovak photographer
