= Atlanta Jewish Film Festival =

Jewish Film Festival in Atlanta

Atlanta Jewish Film Festival (AJFF)
- Location: Atlanta, Georgia, United States
- Founded: 2000
- Founded by: American Jewish Committee
- Artistic director: Kenny Blank
- Website: www.ajff.org

The Atlanta Jewish Film Festival is the largest film festival of any kind in the state of Georgia and is the largest Jewish film festival in the world. The festival is held in late winter at multiple venues in Atlanta, Georgia and in the suburbs of Alpharetta, Marietta and Sandy Springs. Contemporary and classic independent Jewish film from around the world feature at the festival.

== History ==
The festival was founded in 2000 by the Atlanta regional office of American Jewish Committee and continues to grow each year, with an estimated 20,000 attendees by 2010. In 2015, more than 38,600 attended the festival. The festival was incorporated as an independent 501(c)(3) non-profit in 2014. Kenny Blank (son of Atlanta businessman Arthur Blank) serves as the executive director of the organization.

AJFF has honored Lawrence Kasdan (Screenwriter, Director, Producer) in 2016 and Itzhak Perlman (World renowned Israeli-American musician) in 2019 with AJFF Icon Awards.

The Atlanta Jewish Film Festival celebrated its 20th anniversary in February 2020 with a lineup of 64 films from 17 countries.

In 2020, the Atlanta Jewish Film Festival launched a series of virtual programming prompted by the COVID-19 crisis.

== Audience Award winners ==
| Year | Narrative | Documentary | Short |
|---|---|---|---|
| 2002 | All My Loved Ones | — | |
| 2003 | — | Strange Fruit | |
| 2004 | — | Paper Clips | |
| 2005 | Bonjour Monsieur Shlomi | Rene and I | |
| 2006 | Live and Become | 39 Pounds of Love | |
| 2007 | Olga | Rape of Europa | |
| 2008 | Nina's Journey | I Have Never Forgotten You | |
| 2009 | The Little Traitor | Blessed Is the Match: The Life and Death of Hannah Senesh | |
| 2010 | Who Do You Love? | Where I Stand: The Hank Greenspun Story | |
| 2011 | The Round Up | Crime After Crime | |
| 2012 | Wunderkinder | Nicky's Family | |
| 2013 | Süskind | Joe Papp in Five Acts | |
| 2014 | The Third Half | Marvin Hamlisch: What He Did For Love | |
| 2015 | Apples from the Desert | Above and Beyond | |
| 2016 | Naked Among Wolves | Breakfast at Ina's | To Step Forward Myself |
| 2017 | Fanny's Journey | The Freedom to Marry | Joe's Violin |
| 2018 | The Last Suit | Itzhak | The Number on Great-Grandpa's Arm |
| 2019 | Shoelaces | Prosecuting Evil: The Extraordinary World of Ben Ferencz | I Have a Message for You |
| 2020 | The Keeper | Saul & Ruby, To Life! | A Jew Walks Into a Bar |
| 2021 | Here We Are (film) | Love It Was Not | Space Torah |
| 2022 | Persian Lessons | Fiddler's Journey to the Big Screen | Ruth: A Little Girl's Big Journey |
