= Joey Adams =

Comedian and author (1911–1999)

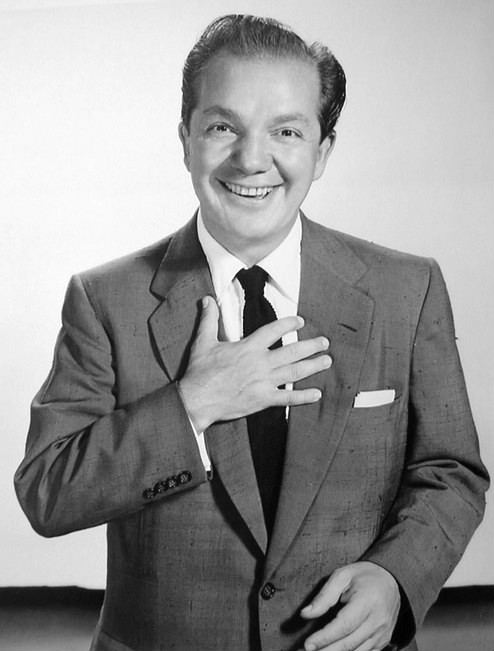
- Adams as the host of the radio show Spend a Million (1954)
- Born: Joseph Abramowitz; January 6, 1911; Brooklyn, New York, U.S.
- Died: December 2, 1999 (aged 88); Manhattan, New York, U.S.
- Occupations: comedian; vaudevillian; radio host; nightclub performer; author; labor union president; news columnist
- Spouse: Cindy Adams (m. 1952)

Joseph Abramowitz (January 6, 1911 – December 2, 1999), known professionally as Joey Adams, was an American comedian, vaudevillian, radio host, nightclub performer, and author. He was inducted into the New York Friars' Club in Midtown Manhattan in 1977 and wrote the book Borscht Belt in 1973.

== Early life ==
Adams was born Joseph Abramowitz on January 6, 1911 and grew up in the then-predominantly-Jewish neighborhood of Brownsville, Brooklyn. After attending the local public school and junior high school, and graduating from high school, Adams went to City College in northern Manhattan, but left before graduating. He had siblings, including a sister and three brothers.

His father Nathan Abramowitz was a tailor who later moved to The Bronx. His mother was Ida Chonin.

== Career ==
Joseph Abramowitz changed his name to Joey Adams in 1930, and married his second wife, Cindy Adams, in 1952. For many years Joey (whose "first wife was the sister of Walter Winchell’s wife") wrote the Strictly for Laughs column in the New York Post, the same newspaper where 1930-born Cindy established her reputation as a society/gossip columnist.

Adams' career spanned more than 70 years and included appearances in nightclubs and vaudeville shows. For a while he also hosted his own radio show and wrote 23 books including From Gags to Riches, Joey Adams Joke Book, Laugh Your Calories Away, On the Road with Uncle Sam, and Encyclopedia of Humor. The Yale Book of Quotations cites him as being the first to say, "With friends like that, who needs enemies?". He hosted an unsold game show pilot called Rate Your Mate based on a 1950s radio show of the same name (also hosted by Adams) in 1951.

On September 7, 1952, The Joey Adams Show debuted on WAAM-TV in Baltimore. The comedy-variety program was broadcast on Sunday nights from 10 to 10:30 p.m. Eastern Time "with a large weekly talent budget". He made numerous other TV appearances over the years, including on The Ed Sullivan Show, Howard Stern's 1990s TV shows, and What's My Line? He was in the films Singing in the Dark (1956, of which he was also executive producer), Don't Worry, We'll Think of a Title (1966), and Silent Prey (1997). For many years, he hosted a radio talk show on WEVD in New York. In addition, Adams also hosted the short-lived 1953 game show Back That Fact on ABC.

== Honors ==
In 1963 Adams, then serving as AGVA president, helped to finance and organize an August 5 variety show in Birmingham, Alabama, to raise funds for the August 28 March on Washington for Jobs and Freedom. He shared the stage with many speakers and performers including Martin Luther King Jr., Ray Charles, Dick Gregory, Nina Simone, Joe Louis, Johnny Mathis, James Baldwin, and The Shirelles.

For his civic work, Adams was honored by presidents and statesmen, and he held honorary doctorates in comedy from his alma mater City College, and from Columbia University, Long Island University, and New York University.

== Death ==
Adams died December 2, 1999, at St. Vincent's Hospital in Manhattan, aged 88, from heart failure. Eulogies were delivered by Adams's widow and Mayor Rudy Giuliani. Services were held at Riverside Memorial Chapel on the Upper West Side. His widow had his remains cremated.
