= Imaginary Witness =

Imaginary Witness: Hollywood and the Holocaust
- Theatrical release poster
- Directed by: Daniel Anker
- Produced by: Daniel Anker, Ellin Baumel
- Starring: Gene Hackman (narrator: voice)
- Cinematography: Tom Hurwitz, Nancy Shreiber
- Edited by: Bruce Shaw
- Music by: Andrew Barrett
- Production companies: Anker Productions, Inc.
- Release dates: May 6, 2004 (First Film Festival screening); April 5, 2005 (U.S. cable television release); December 25, 2007 (Official U.S. theater release date)
- Running time: 92 minutes
- Country: United States
- Language: English

Imaginary Witness: Hollywood and the Holocaust is a 2004 documentary film directed by Daniel Anker and narrated by Gene Hackman that examines the treatment of the Holocaust in Hollywood films over a period of sixty years and the impact of the films on public perception and thinking, and vice versa. The film was originally produced for the American cable network, American Movie Classics.

== Background ==
Director and film-maker Daniel Anker's father was a refugee from Germany, and many of his relatives, including his great-grandfather, uncle, and cousin were murdered in the Holocaust, but he had not considered making a film on the subject until AMC approached him with the idea. His past projects on issues including campaign finance reform and racism, convinced the AMC leadership that he was the right person for the project, and they agreed to leave "the specifics of the project to him."

According to Anker, he was inspired by the documentary technique employed in the film Visions of Light—a documentary about films and film-makers—and made the decision to use extended clips from Holocaust movies to tell his story. He included interviews with some of the people who worked on the films he chose, including directors Sidney Lumet and Steven Spielberg and actors including Rod Steiger.

As Anker shows in the film, Hollywood did not only tell stories about the Holocaust, it actually helped to document the war. "Directors Frank Capra, John Huston, Billy Wilder, and George Stevens all worked for the Army Signal Corps' motion picture unit. So important did the US government consider their work that after liberation, film crews went into concentration camps even before medical teams. In the portion of the film describing the initial screenings of their footage back in the U.S., a portion narrated by film editor Stanley Frazen and screenwriter Melvin Wald, Wald says that "It was the most horrifying thing I'd ever seen, because the inmates walking in their black and white uniforms were like ghosts," and Frazen admits that he had to leave the projection room to vomit.

== Release ==
Although the official US film release is recorded as December 25, 2007, it was shown earlier than that at a number of film festivals, including: Tribeca Film Festival (May 6, 2004), Newport International Film Festival (June 10, 2004), San Francisco Jewish Film Festival (July 27, 2004), Adelaide Film Festival (February 21, 2005), Cleveland International Film Festival (March 15, 2005), Thessaloniki Documentary Festival (April 4, 2005), Iceland International Film Festival (April 11, 2005), Warsaw International Jewish Film Festival Ha-Motiv Ha-Jehudi (May 23, 2005), and the Hong Kong Jewish Film Festival (November 25, 2007). Its U.S. TV premiere was April 5, 2005.

The late 2007 release date is attributed to the fact that it was originally made for cable TV, and then only later screened in theaters for a short time before the release of the DVD.

== Content ==
Imaginary Witness includes scenes from over forty films and newsreels, and interviews with leading scholars, filmmakers, and Holocaust witnesses, to show how films portrayed Holocaust events, reflected public sentiment, or helped to shape it. It explores "the question of how an industry that sells fantasy has dealt with one of the most horrifying episodes in modern world history, but also how the movies themselves reflect America's ever-evolving relationship to the events of that era." Among the many films excerpted for the documentary are The Mortal Storm, The Great Dictator, The Diary of Anne Frank, and Schindler's List.

The movie website includes this description:

At the core of the film is an ethical and moral debate about portrayal. Is it even possible to imagine on screen the unimaginable? Should the movie industry even undertake such an endeavor? Ultimately, the film asks hard questions: about the uneasy relationship between American popular culture and the Holocaust, about the responsibility of filmmakers in their portrayal of history, and about the power of film to affect the way we look at ourselves.

Movie reviewer Mark Deming, writing for All Movie Guide wrote:

The American film industry took it upon itself to act as a cheerleader for United States and Allied military interests during World War II, but Hollywood was initially reluctant to directly condemn Nazi anti-Semitism, and it wasn't until years after the war ended that American filmmakers began offering a realistic, dramatic look at the horrible toll of Hitler's "final solution." Imaginary Witness: Hollywood and the Holocaust is a documentary which examines how filmmakers reacted to German scapegoating of Jews before, during, and after the war, ranging from the boldness of Confessions of a Nazi Spy and The Mortal Storm (both of which were produced before America entered the war) to more oblique statements during the war itself, and then finally leading to an honest portrayal of the full consequences of the Holocaust beginning in the '50s.

In addition to excerpts from Hollywood films, the documentary includes official military newsreel footage of thirteen studio moguls who traveled to Europe to witness personally the evidence of Nazi atrocities at the invitation of General Eisenhower.

"It felt to us like a seminal moment," says Anker who uncovered documents in the personal files of Jack L. Warner at USC. The message of the trip was clear: go home and bear witness to these atrocities, and for a time newsreels did carry graphic images of bulldozers burying bodies at Bergen-Belsen, an image that would be etched in the collective memory of a generation of people. But Eisenhower's mission was not accomplished and it would be decades before Hollywood would again depict a concentration camp on screen.

Eisenhower, who wrote to Chief of Staff George Marshall that he had personally visited Ohrdruf concentration camp "in order to be in a position to give first hand evidence of these things if ever, in the future, there develops a tendency to charge these allegations merely to propaganda," sent out invitations to journalists, photographers, and film makers from both the United States and England. He explained his belief that permanent documentation of the atrocities American forces had uncovered was crucial for many reasons, including the fact that, "We are told that the American soldier does not know what he is fighting for. Now, at least, he will know what he is fighting against."

This documentary has been recognized as a chronicle not only of an important element of film history, but also of world history. As one review put it,

This ambitious documentary provides not only a survey of Hollywood films about the Holocaust, but also a history of the Holocaust itself, and of the main cultural currents that characterized pre- and postwar America. The result is a frank, complex look at how the film industry both influences and is in turn influenced by the culture at large.

=== Featured films ===
The documentary includes newsclips from newsreels, from footage of liberated camps to events such as a conference in Jerusalem of Holocaust survivors; clips from television productions including one episode of This Is Your Life, in which a woman is reunited with her sister, who she thought had died in the Holocaust; documentaries such as Kitty: Return to Auschwitz; some excerpts from films not directly depicting the Holocaust but related to its memory, such as the miniseries Roots, which paved the way for the miniseries, Holocaust, or Objective, Burma!, an example of a World War II film depicting the War in the Pacific; even one Looney Tunes cartoon, The Ducktators; and excerpts from feature films with direct Holocaust content. These Holocaust films include:

- Black Legion
- Cabaret
- Confessions of a Nazi Spy
- Crossfire
- The Diary of Anne Frank
- Gentleman's Agreement
- The Great Dictator
- Harold and Maude
- Heroes for Sale
- Hitler's Children
- Hitler's Madman
- Holocaust (NBC miniseries)
- Judgment at Nuremberg (both CBS Playhouse 90 teleplay and feature film)
- I Married a Nazi
- The Mortal Storm
- None Shall Escape
- The Pawnbroker
- The Producers
- The Search
- Schindler's List
- Ship of Fools
- Singing in the Dark
- Sophie's Choice
- To Be or Not to Be
- Tomorrow the World
- Underground
- War and Remembrance (ABC miniseries)

=== Interviews ===
"After spending six months doing research, selecting film clips and writing a script, Anker and his team set out to do the 21 interviews that form the backbone of the film ... Anker's goal was to get at least one major player from each film who could address the issues of that film." Those interviewed in the film are:

- Norma Barzman, Screenwriter
- Michael Berenbaum, Historian
- Robert Berger, Producer
- Robert Clary, Actor and Holocaust survivor
- Dan Curtis, Director
- Stanley Frazen, Film editor
- Neal Gabler, Historian
- Annette Insdorf, Film historian
- Sidney Lumet, Director
- Branko Lustig, Film producer and Holocaust survivor
- Abby Mann, Screenwriter
- Gene Reynolds, Actor/Director
- Sharon Rivo, Film historian
- Thane Rosenbaum, Writer
- Vincent Sherman, Director (at 96, the oldest person interviewed in the film)
- Steven Spielberg, Director/Producer
- Martin Starger, Producer
- Rod Steiger, Actor
- George Stevens, Jr., Producer
- Malvin Wald, Screenwriter
- Fritz Weaver, Actor

In addition to the interviews specifically conducted for the documentary, clips of many other individuals are included within newsreels and television discussions that are included in the film, such as Holocaust survivor Benjamin Meed and Rabbi Joachim Prinz, former religious leader of the Berlin Synagogue.

== Structure ==
Interweaving the interviews and the film clips, the documentary describes how the history of the depiction of the Holocaust in Hollywood films can be divided into four distinct phases:

- First: Hollywood's reluctance to critique the rise of Nazism during the 1930s, during a time when its "self-policing Production Code expressly forbade any unfair depictions of other nations, particularly when economic interests were at stake." The documentary shows that the one exception during this phase was Charlie Chaplin's 1940 film, The Great Dictator.
- Second: films made during the years of the war, most of which focused on the war in the Pacific. Films that dealt directly with Nazi Germany, such as the 1944 film Tomorrow the World, usually focused on the certain victory of democracy over fascism. Only some of the so-called lower-budget "B movies" like the 1944 film None Shall Escape "dared to directly address the Final Solution," often because these movies "tended to fall below the radar of the Production Code."
- Third: During the early post-war years, in the aftermath of the films produced by the U.S. Army's Signal Corps Motion Picture Units following the liberation of the concentration camps, films began to incorporate the atrocities of the Holocaust into films. However, after two 1947 films that dealt directly with anti-semitism, Crossfire and Gentleman's Agreement, films became all-but-silent during the late 1940s and 1950s on the subject of the Holocaust. Even the Signal Corps footage "was put away in favor of courting the new post-Nazi German market." During this time, some treatment of the Holocaust did appear in certain films and television programs, although with strict restrictions: the 1959 film adaptation of the play The Diary of Anne Frank was produced based on the promise that "audiences would not be subjected to any Nazi horrors"; and when Playhouse 90 produced the television play "Judgment at Nuremberg" (later adapted to film), the sponsor—the American Gas Company—required that the word "gas" never be mentioned.
- Four: The fourth phase (and the phase that continues through the present time) -- direct confrontation with the history and events of the Holocaust—was ushered in by the television mini-series Holocaust in 1978. The documentary points out that it was the success of the television miniseries Roots that first interested the American Movie Classics in a miniseries about the Holocaust, and the project was given the "green light" one week after Roots was aired. Although criticized by some organizations as reducing the atrocity to the level of soap opera, this miniseries turned out to be the first introduction of the subject to many members of the young generation, including those in Germany, where it had a powerful impact on the desire to learn more. In fact, as the movie points out, the airing of the miniseries in Germany led to new discussions of the event, and ultimately played a direct role on the decision of the government to cancel the statute of limitations on war crimes which was due to expire in 1979. Among the major Hollywood films that would follow were Sophie's Choice (1982) and Schindler's List (1993). As one movie review put it, "Unfortunately, as each remaining survivor dies, most people become more and more reliant on Hollywood's depiction of these events for our memory and understanding of what may be in essence incomprehensible."

== Response ==
The film was an audience favorite at more than 50 film festivals around the world, and the subject of numerous discussions, panels, and conferences at theaters, universities, and museums around the world. As of January 14, 2011, it had received a favorable rating of 88% on the Rotten Tomatoes review website.

Critical praise for the documentary included the New York Times, which called the film a "devastating, impressively reflective documentary." The reviewer for New York's Newsday wrote that the film "Reduced me to tears ... A powerful documentary that examines how a movie industry that ordinarily traffics in fantasy has dealt with the hideous reality of Hitler's genocidal campaign against the Jews."

On review aggregator website Rotten Tomatoes, the film holds an approval rating of 88% based on 16 reviews, with an average rating of 7.1/10.

== Awards ==
- 2004 Special Jury Award, Documentary Research, Fort Lauderdale International Film Festival
- 2004 Audience Award, Best Documentary, Hamptons International Film Festival
- Special Jury Award, Florida International Film Festival
- Award: Best Documentary, Festival de Cinema Judaico de São Paulo

== See also ==
- List of Holocaust films
