= Rate Your Mate =

American radio quiz series (1950–1951)

Rate Your Mate is a 30-minute old-time radio quiz program that was broadcast on CBS from July 30, 1950, until February 27, 1950, and from July 7, 1951, to July 18, 1951. The trade publication Billboard reported that the program was one of "only two CBS packages [that] really clicked" in the summer of 1950.

Joey Adams, in his radio debut, was the host of the program, which featured competition between married couples. With one person in a soundproof booth, his or her spouse had to predict whether the isolated contestant could answer a particular question. Each couple dealt with four questions worth $25 each. Winning the money depended not on whether the isolated person answered the question correctly but whether the spouse accurately predicted whether the answer would be correct.

The show initially was a summer replacement for Arthur Godfrey Digest from 9:30 to 10 p.m. Eastern Time on Saturdays. On July 30, 1950, it was moved to Sundays at 9 p.m. E.T.

== Production ==
Rate Your Mate was created by Peter Arnell. Mark Goodson and Bill Todman were the producers, and Goodson directed the show. Norman Barasch and Carol Moore were the writers. Hal Simms was the announcer.

== Critical response ==
A review in the Chicago Tribune compared Rate Your Mate to You Bet Your Life. It said that formats of the programs were "identical except for inconsequential gimmicks," and that Adams essentially imitated the voice of Groucho Marx, host of You Bet Your Life. It added, however, that Adams could not match Marx with regard to ad-libs.

Walter Ames, writing in the Los Angeles Times, called Rate Your Mate "one of radio's funniest shows". Ames questioned why no company sponsored the program, and he suggested that the show had trouble gaining an audience "because it is always being shifted on the time schedule".

A review in the trade publication Variety said that Rate Your Mate had "a thin format with obvious defects", one of which was that a couple could win if the spouses agreed beforehand that the one in the soundproof booth would answer each question incorrectly. The review noted similarities between Adams and Marx and said that after Adams became acclimated to performing on radio, "he'll make his imprint as a quizmaster."
