= Hal Simms =

American television announcer

Hal Simms (June 10, 1919 – July 2, 2002) was an American television announcer, known for his long career on the CBS television network.

== Life and career ==
Simms was born on June 10, 1919, in Boston. He graduated from the Boston Latin High School and in 1940, he completed a degree at the University of Michigan.

Simms started his career at a Portsmouth, New Hampshire radio station, followed by joining a CBS affiliate station in Philadelphia before moving to New York City. He was persuaded to move to New York by Robert Q. Lewis and Mike Wallace, whom Simms knew from college.

Beginning in the early 1950s, he became a frequent television and radio announcer on CBS programs, known for saying the tagline "CBS presents this program in color." Among the programs that Simms announced were Beat the Clock, The Guiding Light, The Frank Sinatra Show, The Edge of Night, Go Lucky, I'll Buy That, What's My Line?, Rate Your Mate, and The Steve Allen Show. Simms appeared with Jack Paar on The Morning Show.

For his last ten years at CBS, Simms was announcer-in-chief. After a fifty-year career, Simms retired in 1992.

Simms lived in White Plains, New York, for many years. He served as president of the Brotherhood at Temple Israel Center in White Plains and as president of the New York chapter of the American Federation of Television and Radio Artists (AFTRA).

Simms died on July 2, 2002, at the age of 83, in Brookline, Massachusetts. Simms was married to Renée Simms, they had three children. Simms is interred at Ferncliff Cemetery.

== Works cited ==
- Vincent Terrace, Radio Programs, 1924-1984: A Catalog of More Than 1800 Shows (McFarland: 1999.
- Vincent Terrace, Television Introductions: Narrated TV Program Openings since 1949 (Scarecrow: 2013).
