= Cindy Adams =

American gossip columnist and writer (born 1930)

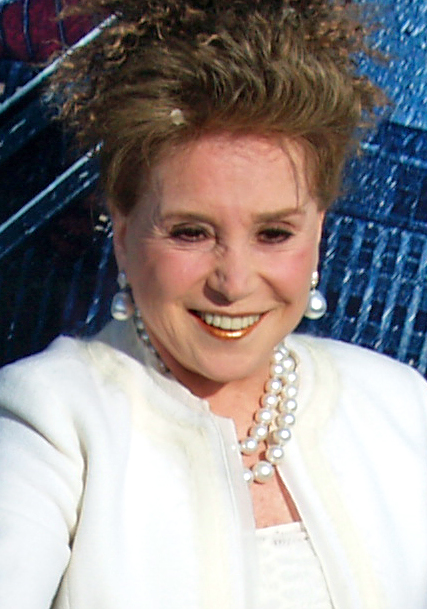
- Adams in 2007
- Born: Cynthia I. First; April 24, 1930 (age 96); New York City, U.S.
- Occupations: Biographer; gossip columnist; memoirist
- Spouse: Joey Adams (m. 1952; died 1999)

Cynthia Heller Adams (born Cynthia I. First; April 24, 1930), commonly known as Cindy Adams, is an American gossip columnist and writer. Adams is most notable for her decades of first-hand reporting on personalities from the worlds of entertainment and politics, especially for the New York Post newspaper. She is a lifelong resident of New York City, and is the widow of comedian/humorist Joey Adams.

== Early life and education ==
Cindy Heller Adams was born in Manhattan as Cynthia I. First on April 24, 1930. Her parents Jessica and Jerome First divorced in 1932, and Jessica married Harry Heller when Cindy was 3. Cindy attended Andrew Jackson High School in Queens, New York, but did not graduate as planned in 1946, citing an incomplete sewing assignment in home economics. She received an honorary diploma in 2024.

== Career ==
=== Film ===
Cindy Adams, as Cindy Heller, played Biff's Mistress in Singing in the Dark (1956) with Joey Adams, who played Joey Napoleon.

=== Writing ===
Since 1979, Adams has written a prominent gossip column for the New York Post, a New York City newspaper that has featured approximately 500 of her stories on its front page. She became a syndicated columnist in 1981. A lifelong New Yorker, she is known for "her vast circle of acquaintances" among celebrities, and for ending her "wise-cracking, pithy, opinionated" columns with the catch phrase: "Only in New York, kids, only in New York."

Adams wrote for local newspapers at the same time as her husband Joey, who wrote a humor column for the Long Island Press and then the New York Post. They met numerous national leaders on a 1961 tour of Asia, representing the US government and culture. In 1965, Cindy Adams co-wrote an autobiography of Indonesian president Sukarno, about whom she wrote another book in 1967 after he was overthrown.

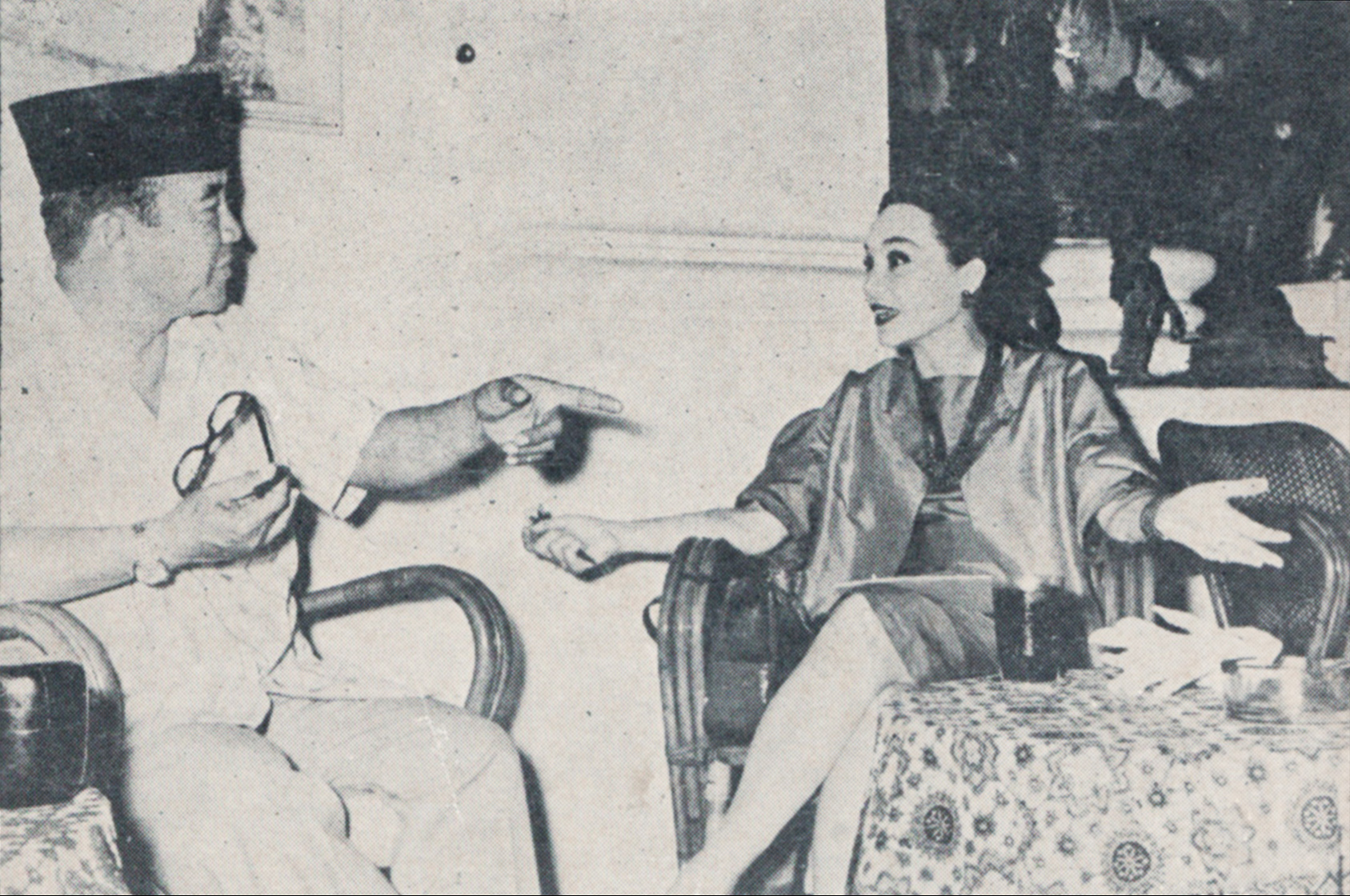
Adams interviewing Indonesian president Sukarno in the 1960s

In 1970, she first interviewed Mohammad Reza Pahlavi, the shah of Iran. Adams also became friendly with Imelda Marcos, the controversial widow of former Philippine president Ferdinand Marcos. In 1975, Adams co-wrote an autobiography of Jolie Gabor, mother of the celebrity Gabor sisters. Later biographies by Adams included actor Lee Strasberg (1980) and political matriarch Rose Fitzgerald Kennedy (1995).

Adams is especially known for her sympathetic coverage of celebrities facing legal difficulties. When Imelda Marcos, Leona Helmsley, John Gotti, Claus von Bülow, Sydney Biddle Barrows, Mario Biaggi, Bess Myerson and Stanley Friedman all attended a birthday gala that Adams hosted for her husband, he famously remarked to the crowd: "If you're indicted, you're invited."

In 2003, Cindy Adams authored a St. Martin's Publishing Group book titled The Gift of Jazzy, a memoir of appreciation for her pet dog. She authored a sequel in 2006, titled Living a Dog's Life: Jazzy, Juicy, and Me. The introduction to the book includes a comical note from the author: "Neither Jazzy nor Juicy had any hand in the writing of this book. The creativity is strictly mine. And let it be known, some of the names, places, and incidents have been changed to protect the guilty."

=== Television ===
Starting in 1986, Adams was an original contributor to the syndicated, tabloid television show A Current Affair. In 1990–1991, she served as a panelist on many episodes of To Tell the Truth, an NBC television network game show. In the late 1990s, she appeared regularly on Good Morning America, a morning news-and-talk show on the ABC television network.

Adams promoted luxury dog-related products on the QVC shopping channel, where her longtime friend Joan Rivers promoted a line of jewelry. Adams also contributed twice a week to the Live at Five newscast on WNBC television, and then to the station's Sunday Today in New York newscast. Her life and career were spotlighted in the 2021 documentary mini-series Gossip, on the Showtime television network.

== Animal activism ==
After the 1999 death of Joey Adams, Cindy's husband of nearly 47 years, a friend gave her a new loving, loyal companion to help fill the void, a canine named Jazzy. The Yorkshire Terrier trailed her in public and became a minor celebrity himself. Adams and Jazzy would often dine together in New York's finest restaurants, including Le Cirque. Adams dresses her dogs in expensive designer clothes and jewelry.

One weekend in 2003, Adams put Jazzy in an upstate New York kennel when she left the city. By the time she returned, Jazzy had died. She had a necropsy performed, which showed E. coli bacteria in the dog's system. In an article published in The New York Times, Adams was quoted as saying, "Now this is a dog that I hand-fed. I would lie on my stomach in the kitchen and hand-feed him kosher chicken. We would go to Le Cirque and eat off of Limoges porcelain. Where would he get E. coli?"

She became a vocal advocate for strengthening regulations of boarding kennels. In 2004, she garnered the support of television journalist Barbara Walters, socialite Ivana Trump, attorney Barry Slotnick, writer Tama Janowitz, and New York City Council Speaker Gifford Miller, to pass the Boarding Kennel and Regulation Act, also known as "Jazzy's Law". According to Adams, "To prevent others from suffering my pain, this local 'Boarding Kennel and Regulation Act' will: license kennels, monitor them regularly, fine those in violation, require records and rules, demand boarded pets prove vaccination and immunization against contagious doggy diseases." Despite the increasingly strict New York City health code, which permits only service animals in restaurants, Adams continues to bring her dogs to New York eateries.

== Personal life ==
By her own admission, Adams has often falsified details relating to her age, her wealth, her romances, and other aspects of her personal life: "I lie about how much I make, I lie about what I weigh, I lie about my sex life, and I lie about my age." As a result, different versions have circulated over the years, along with her disclaimers of accuracy. What follows is a summary of what appears to be the most-reliable published information.

=== Marriage to Joey Adams ===
Cindy Heller began to work as a photographer's model in Manhattan at age 15. Soon after, she met her future husband, comedian/humorist Joey Adams, when they were guests on the same radio show. They married on Valentine's Day 1952, and had no children. Joey died in 1999, following a long illness. Cindy's words after her husband's death included:

- "My career came because I married Joey."
- "This man gave me everything. Everything I have, I got from him. He introduced me to the world."

=== Doris Duke apartment ===
Adams lives and works in a nine-room penthouse apartment with a 1,000-square-foot (93 m^{2}) veranda on Park Avenue in Manhattan, which she and her husband purchased from the estate of billionaire tobacco heiress Doris Duke in 1997. Because of the apartment's connection with Duke, Adams hosted the wrap party for the television biographical film Bernard and Doris (2008), about Duke's later years and relationship with her butler.

=== Critical illness in 2010 ===
Adams ceased writing her regular New York Post column in May 2010 without notice, and there was no news beyond brief mentions that she was "unwell". In late June, Liz Smith, another gossip columnist (previously with the Post), reported in her online column that Adams was ill with a stomach malady. A Christian Scientist, Adams had avoided medical help until forced by friends Barbara Walters and television judge Judith Sheindlin to obtain it.

Sheindlin was Adams's healthcare proxy, as Adams had no remaining immediate family. Smith reported on June 29, 2010, that "she [Adams] is now on the mend". Adams's column returned to the Post on September 20, 2010, explaining that she had received intensive care for a ruptured appendix, anemia, sepsis, and damaged heart valves. With gallows humor, she summarized her near-death experience by referencing a recently deceased news icon: "Seems another day and I'd have been interviewing Walter Cronkite."

== Books published ==
- Sukarno; Adams, Cindy (1965). Sukarno: An Autobiography. Bobbs-Merrill (Indianapolis, Indiana; Kansas City, Missouri). OCLC 256887.
- Adams, Cindy (1967). My Friend the Dictator. Bobbs-Merrill (Indianapolis, Indiana). OCLC 1129848.
- Gabor, Jolie; Adams, Cindy (1975). Jolie Gabor. Mason/Charter (New York City). ISBN 978-0-88405-125-1.
- Adams, Cindy (1980). Lee Strasberg: The Imperfect Genius of the Actors Studio. Doubleday (Garden City, New York). ISBN 978-0-385-12496-6.
- Adams, Cindy; Crimp, Susan (1995). Iron Rose: The Story of Rose Fitzgerald Kennedy and Her Dynasty. Dove Books (Beverly Hills, California). ISBN 978-0-7871-0475-7.
- Adams, Cindy (2003). The Gift of Jazzy. St. Martin's Press (New York City). ISBN 978-0-312-27307-1.
- Adams, Cindy (2006). Living a Dog's Life: Jazzy, Juicy, and Me. St. Martin's Press (New York City). ISBN 978-0-312-32377-6.

== See also ==
- List of animal rights advocates
- List of biographers
- List of people from New York City
