= Joe Schlesinger =

Canadian television journalist (1928–2019)

- Born: Josef Schlesinger; May 11, 1928; Vienna, Austria
- Died: February 11, 2019 (aged 90)
- Education: University of British Columbia
- Occupations: Television journalist, author
- Notable credit(s): CBC Television, CBC Newsworld
- Spouse: Myra Eileen Kemmer (m. 1964; died 2001)
- Partner(s): Sandra Louet (2003–2008, her death); Dr. Judith Levene (2009–2019, his death)
- Children: 2 daughters
- Awards: Gemini Award (1987, 1992); Order of Canada (1994); John Drainie Award (1997)

Josef Schlesinger, CM (May 11, 1928 – February 11, 2019) was a Canadian foreign correspondent, television journalist, and author.

== Early life and career ==
Schlesinger was born to a devout Ashkenazi Austrian-Jewish family in Vienna, Austria, on May 11, 1928. He was raised in Bratislava, Czechoslovakia, where his parents, Emmanuel and Lilli (Fischl) Schlesinger, owned a cleaning supplies shop.

After Czechoslovakia was occupied by Germany in 1938, he and his younger brother, Ernest, were sent to England by his parents as part of the kindertransport, organized by Nicholas Winton, that rescued 669 Jewish children. His parents were later killed in the Holocaust. Schlesinger appears in and narrates the 2011 documentary Nicky's Family about Winton and the kindertransport.

Schlesinger pursued a journalism career after the war, first working at the Prague bureau of the Associated Press in 1948 as a translator. He fled Czechoslovakia after its Communist government began arresting journalists, crossing the border into Austria. In 1950, he immigrated to Canada. He arrived at Pier 21 in Halifax and travelled across the country to Vancouver to join his brother, who had immigrated to Canada earlier under the Canadian Jewish War Orphans Project.

After studying at the University of British Columbia in Vancouver and editing the student newspaper, he reported for the city's afternoon newspaper, The Province, before moving to the Toronto Daily Star. He then left Canada and edited for UPI in London and the International Herald Tribune in Paris.

== Career with the CBC ==
Schlesinger returned to Canada in 1966 and joined the Canadian Broadcasting Corporation as executive producer of The National but soon returned to reporting and served as the CBC's foreign correspondent variously in Hong Kong, Paris, Washington and Berlin, reporting on the Vietnam War, the Cultural Revolution and Ping-pong diplomacy in China, the Iranian Revolution, guerrilla wars in Nicaragua and El Salvador, the fall of the Berlin Wall, and ultimately the fall of the Iron Curtain including the Velvet Revolution in his homeland of Czechoslovakia.

In 1990, he wrote his autobiography, Time Zones: a Journalist in the World, which became a bestseller. Schlesinger described his early career in an interview with Czech public radio Radio Prague, aired on March 21, 2005.

In the early 1990s Schlesinger was promoted to managing editor of CBC News, producing commentaries and documentaries for the short-lived CBC Prime Time News. He retired from full-time employment in 1994, but continued to produce essays and special reports for CBC News. In the last half of the 1990s he became host of a few foreign news magazine programs on CBC Newsworld, including Foreign Assignment (shared with Ian Hanomansing), and Schlesinger. He continued to produce occasional documentaries for the CBC and write commentaries for the CBC News website into his eighties.

== Honours ==
He was made a Member of the Order of Canada in 1994.

He was nominated for 18 Gemini Awards, winning three, for "Best Reportage" (1987 and 1992) and "Best News Magazine Segment" (2004). He was also awarded the John Drainie Award (1997) and "Best Performance by a Broadcast Journalist (Gordon Sinclair Award)" (1987).

On June 7, 2010, he received an honorary doctorate of laws from Queen's University in Kingston, and delivered the convocation speech to part of the graduating class of 2010 from Queens' Faculty of Arts and Sciences.

On June 8, 2011, he received an honorary doctorate of letters from the University of Alberta in Edmonton for his long and distinguished career, and also delivered a speech to part of the U of A's 2011 graduating class of the Faculty of Arts.

He also held honorary doctorates from the University of British Columbia, the Royal Military College of Canada, Dalhousie University and Carleton University.

In 2016, he was inducted to the CBC News Hall of Fame, the second CBC news personality to be inducted after Knowlton Nash in 2015.

== Death ==
Schlesinger died after a prolonged illness on February 11, 2019, at the age of 90, in Toronto.
