= Paulo Ribenboim =

Brazilian-Canadian mathematician

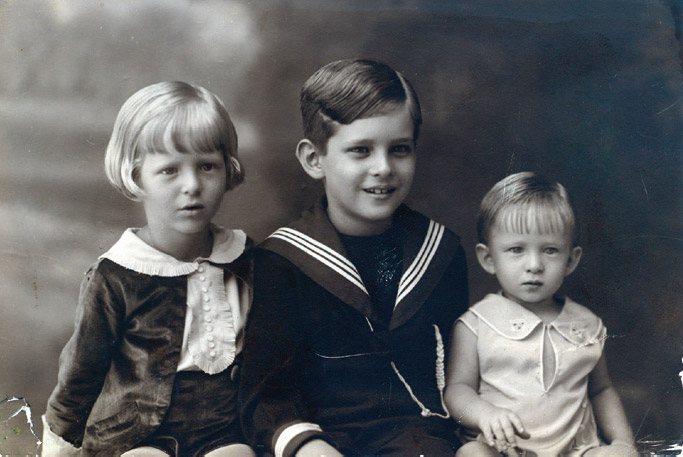
- Ribenboim (left) with his two brothers in Recife
- Born: 13 March 1928 (age 98); Recife, Pernambuco, Brazil
- Education: University of São Paulo
- Known for: Ribenboim Prize
- Awards: George Polyá Award (1995)
- Scientific career
- Fields: Mathematics
- Workplaces: Queen's University
- Doctoral advisor: Jean Dieudonné
- Doctoral students: Andrew Granville, Ján Mináč

Paulo Ribenboim (born March 13, 1928) is a Brazilian-Canadian mathematician who specializes in number theory.

== Biography ==
Ribenboim was born into a Jewish family in Recife, Brazil. He received his BSc in mathematics from the University of São Paulo in 1948, and won a fellowship to study with Jean Dieudonné in France at the University of Nancy in the early 1950s, where he became a close friend of Alexander Grothendieck. He has contributed to the theory of ideals and of valuations.

Ribenboim has authored 246 publications including 13 books. He has been at Queen's University in Kingston, Ontario, since the 1960s, where he remains a professor emeritus.

Jean Dieudonné was one of his doctoral advisors. Andrew Granville, Ján Mináč, Karl Dilcher and Aron Simis have been doctoral students of Ribenboim.

The Ribenboim Prize of the Canadian Number Theory Association is named in his honor.

== Personal life ==
In 1951, Ribenboim married Huguette Demangelle, a French Catholic woman whom he met in France. The couple have two children and five grandchildren, and have lived in Canada since 1962.

== Bibliography ==
- Paulo Ribenboim (1964) Functions, Limits, and Continuity , John Wiley & Sons, Inc.
- Paulo Ribenboim (1968). La conjecture d'Artin sur les équations diophantiennes. Queen's papers in pure and applied mathematics. Kingston (Ontario): Queen's University.
- Paulo Ribenboim (1969). Rings and modules. New-York: John Wiley & Sons. ISBN 978-0470718056.
- Paulo Ribenboim (1972). Algebraic numbers. New-York: Wiley-Interscience. ISBN 9780471718048.
- Paulo Ribenboim (1972). L'arithmétique des corps. Méthodes. Paris: Hermann. ISBN 2-7056-5665-0.
- Paulo Ribenboim. (1989). The Book of Prime Number Records. Springer. ISBN 978-0-387-97042-4.
- Paulo Ribenboim. (1995). 13 Lectures on Fermat's Last Theorem. Springer-Verlag. ISBN 978-0-387-90432-0.
- Paulo Ribenboim. (1996). The New Book of Prime Number Records. Springer-Verlag. ISBN 978-0-387-94457-9.
- Collected Papers of Paulo Ribenboim. Queens Univ Campus. 1997. ISBN 978-0-88911-735-8.
- Paulo Ribenboim. (1999). The Little Book of Big Primes. Springer-Verlag. ISBN 978-0-387-97508-5.
- Paulo Ribenboim. (1999). The Theory of Classical Valuations. Springer-Verlag. ISBN 978-0-387-98525-1.
- Paulo Ribenboim. (2000). My Numbers, My Friends: Popular Lectures on Number Theory. Springer-Verlag. ISBN 978-0-387-98911-2.
- Paulo Ribenboim. (2000). Fermat's Last Theorem for Amateurs. Springer-Verlag. ISBN 978-0-387-98508-4.
- Paulo Ribenboim. (2001). Classical Theory of Algebraic Numbers. Springer-Verlag. ISBN 978-0-387-95070-9.
- Paulo Ribenboim. (2004). The Little Book of Bigger Primes. Springer-Verlag. ISBN 978-0-387-20169-6.
- Paulo Ribenboim. (2016). Prime Numbers, Friends Who Give Problems: A Trialogue with Papa Paulo. World-Scientific. ISBN 978-9-814-72581-1.
