= Gossip (TV series) =

2021 TV series

- Genre: Documentary
- Directed by: Jenny Carchman
- Country of origin: United States
- Original language: English
- No. of episodes: 4

Production
- Executive producers: Jenny Carchman; Ron Howard; Brian Grazer; Michael Rosenberg; Sara Bernstein; Justin Wilkes; Troy Searer
- Cinematography: Wolfgang Held
- Running time: 50 minutes
- Production companies: Showtime Documentary Films; Imagine Documentaries

Original release
- Network: Showtime
- Release: August 22 – September 12, 2021

Gossip is an American documentary television miniseries directed and produced by Jenny Carchman. It follows the life and career of gossip columnist Cindy Adams of the New York Post. It consisted of four episodes and premiered on August 22, 2021, on Showtime.

== Plot ==
The series follows the life and career of Cindy Adams, a gossip columnist for The New York Post.

== Episodes ==
No.	Title	Directed by	Original release date	U.S. viewers (millions)
1	"Episode One"	Jenny Carchman	August 22, 2021	0.117
2	"Episode Two"	Jenny Carchman	August 29, 2021	0.058
3	"Episode Three"	Jenny Carchman	September 5, 2021	0.106
4	"Episode Four"	Jenny Carchman	September 12, 2021	0.069

== Production ==
In November 2019, it was announced Jenny Carchman would direct and produce a documentary series revolving around Cindy Adams for Showtime, with Ron Howard set to executive produce under his Imagine Documentaries banner.

== Reception ==
=== Critical reception ===
On Rotten Tomatoes, the series holds an approval rating of 80% based on 5 reviews, with an average rating of 7.50/10. On Metacritic, it has a weighted average score of 57 out of 100, based on 5 critics, indicating "mixed or average reviews".
