= The Power of Good: Nicholas Winton =

- Directed by: Matej Mináč
- Produced by: Patrik Pašš; Matej Mináč
- Music by: Janusz Stoklosa
- Release date: 2002
- Running time: 64 min
- Countries: Czech Republic; Slovakia
- Language: English

The Power of Good: Nicholas Winton (Czech: Síla lidskosti: Nicholas Winton) is a 2002 documentary about Nicholas Winton, the man who organized the Kindertransport rescue mission of 669 children from German-occupied Czechoslovakia on the eve of the Second World War. Director Matej Mináč was inspired by meeting Winton while developing the film treatment for All My Loved Ones.

== See also ==
- Into the Arms of Strangers: Stories of the Kindertransport
- The Children Who Cheated the Nazis

== Awards ==
- Best Documentary - International Emmy Awards (2002)
- Trilobit Prize Czech Republic (2002)
- Slovak Film Critics Prize IGRIC (2002)
- Christopher Award for Film that Affirms the Highest Values of the Human Spirit (2006)
