= Nuremberg: The Nazis Facing their Crimes =

- Directed by: Christian Delage.
- Produced by: Compagnie des Phares et Balises and ARTE
- Release date: 2006
- Country: France

Nuremberg: The Nazis Facing their Crimes (French title: Nuremberg - Les nazis face à leurs crimes) is a 2006 documentary film about the Nuremberg Trials made by French historian and director Christian Delage and coproduced by La Compagnie des Phares et Balises and ARTE France. The English version, narrated by Christopher Plummer, premiered at the Lincoln Center in 2007.

== Background ==
The film is a condensation of the 1945 Nuremberg Trials based on restored courtroom footage and interviews with four participants in the trial: prosecutor Benjamin B. Ferencz, Auschwitz survivor Ernst Michel, who, remarkably, became a reporter at the trial, Budd Schulberg, a member of John Ford's film unit, and chief interpreter Richard Sonnenfeldt.

The prosecution team submitted three films as evidence against the high Nazi officials charged with crimes against peace, war crimes and crimes against humanity. Two of these films, Nazi Concentration Camps and The Nazi Plan, were produced by Ford; the third, The Atrocities Committed by the German-Fascists in the USSR, was a Soviet production directed by Roman Karmen. Excerpts from the sessions in which these films were shown during the trial are significant sequences in the documentary.

Also significant is the "chilling testimony" of prosecution witness Otto Ohlendorf, commanding officer of Einsatzgruppe D and responsible for carrying out mass executions in Eastern Europe, and the description of camp conditions by French resistance fighter Marie-Claude Vaillant-Couturier, a survivor of both Auschwitz-Birkenau and Ravensbrück.

Delange's film also examines how the medium, in this case the original film and sound recordings, and how they came about, affects the writing of history which Delange has examined further. "As a historian," says reviewer Ronnie Scheib, "Delage is obsessed with the growing role of reproduced images in shaping history."
