= Nicky's Family =

2011 film

- Film poster
- Directed by: Matej Mináč
- Written by: Matej Mináč; Patrik Pass
- Produced by: Matej Mináč; Patrik Pass
- Starring: Nicholas Winton
- Cinematography: Dodo Simoncic
- Release date: January 2011
- Running time: 96 minutes
- Country: Czech Republic
- Language: Czech

Nicky's Family (Czech: Nickyho rodina) is a 2011 Czech docudrama directed by Matej Mináč. It is based on the work of Nicholas Winton prior to the outbreak of World War II.

== Cast ==
- Ben Abeles as himself
- The Dalai Lama as himself
- Klára Issová as Mother
- Joe Schlesinger as himself
- Michal Slaný as Sir Nicholas Winton
- Nicholas Winton as himself
