= Ján Mináč =

Canadian mathematician

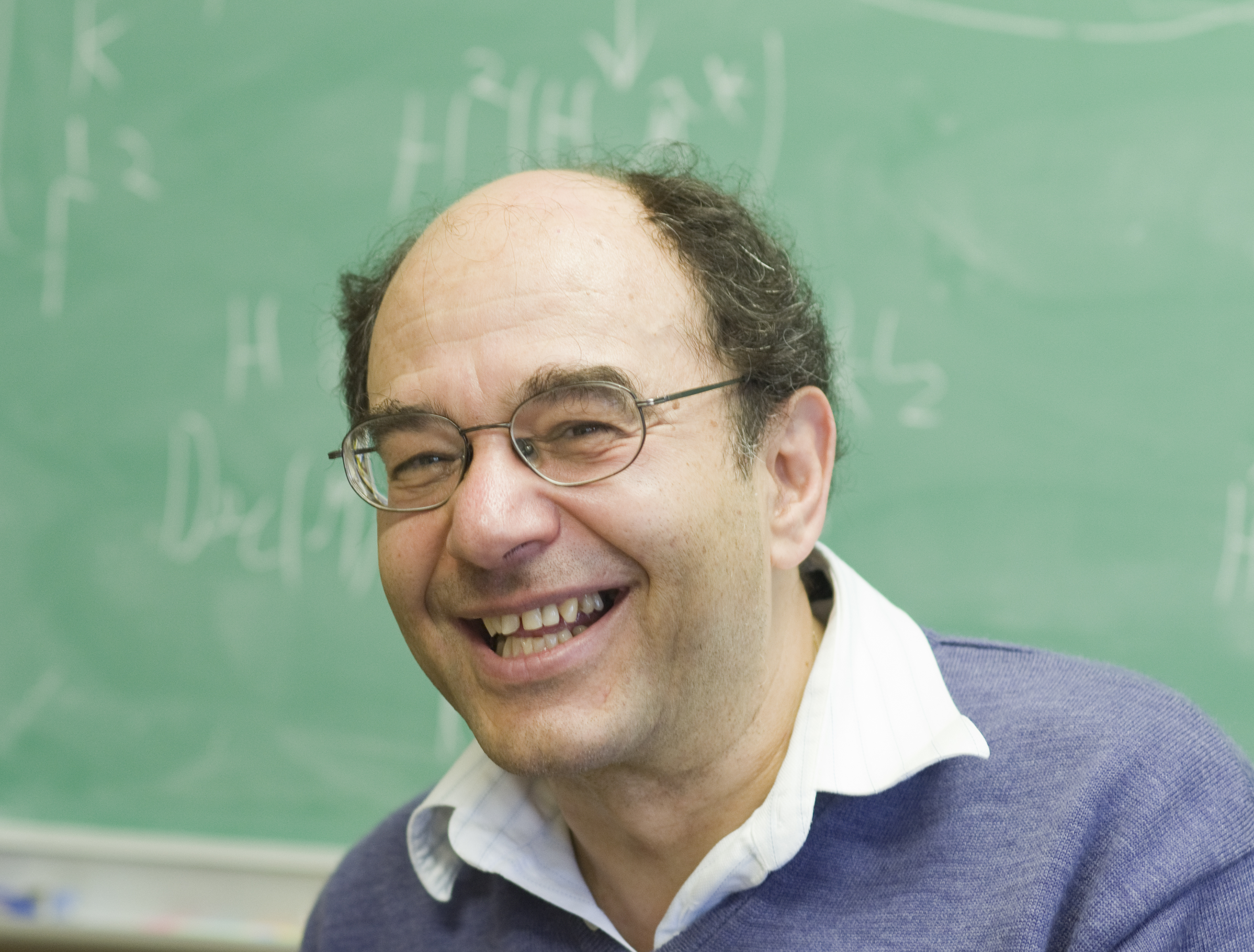
- Ján Mináč
- Born: 15 June 1953 (age 73)
- Education: Queen's University
- Awards: Jeffery-Williams Prize
- Scientific career
- Fields: Mathematics
- Workplaces: University of Western Ontario
- Thesis: Galois Groups, Order Spaces, and Valuations (1986)
- Doctoral advisor: Paulo Ribenboim

Ján Mináč (born 15 June 1953) is a Slovak-Canadian mathematician who is a professor of mathematics at The University of Western Ontario. His research interests include Galois groups, Galois cohomology, quadratic forms, and nonlinear dynamics.

== Early life and education ==
Mináč received his bachelor's degree and his master's level RNDr. degree from Comenius University, Czechoslovakia in 1976 and 1977 respectively. He then earned his Ph.D. in 1986 from Queen's University in Canada under the supervision of Paulo Ribenboim. The title of his thesis is "Galois Groups, Order Spaces, and Valuations".

His brother Matej Mináč is a film director.

== Career ==
Mináč was a member of Mathematical Sciences Research Institute at Berkeley from 1986 to 1987 and then an NSF Postdoctoral Fellow at the University of California at Berkeley from 1987 to 1989. Afterward, he joined the University of Western Ontario as an assistant professor in 1989. He became an associate professor in 1991 and a full professor in 2003.

== Research ==
Mináč and Nguyễn Duy Tân formulated the Mináč-Tân conjectures on the vanishing of Massey products over fields and the kernel unipotent conjecture. He has also worked on Galois theory and quadratic forms, Galois Demushkin groups, mild pro-2-groups, Galois modules, small quotients of Absolute Galois groups, ghosts in group cohomology, Koszulity properties of Galois cohomology, and Zassenhaus filtrations.

Mináč has also worked on non-linear dynamics in networks and its applications to computational neuroscience.

== Awards ==
Mináč received the Distinguished Research Professor Award at Western University during the years 2004-2005 and 2020-2021. In 2019, he became a Fellow of the Canadian Mathematical Society. During the year 2022-2023, he was a fellow at the Western Academy for Advanced Research. In 2013 he received an Excellence in Teaching Award from the Canadian Mathematical Society. Mináč also received multiple teaching awards at the University of Western Ontario.

Mináč was also awarded the 2025 Jeffery-Williams Prize from the Canadian Mathematical Society for his work in the areas of Galois theory, cohomology of groups, number theory and related topics.

He was elected to the 2026 class of Fellows of the American Mathematical Society.
