= Bernard Offen =

Polish Holocaust survivor

Bernard Offen (born 17 April 1929 in Kraków, Poland) is a Holocaust survivor. He survived the Kraków Ghetto and several Nazi concentration camps.

His parents, two brothers, and one sister lived in the Podgórze area of Kraków which in March 1941 became the Kraków Ghetto. His mother, Rochme Gittel Schiffer, and his sister Miriam were deported, probably to Belzec extermination camp, where they were murdered. His father was sent to a gas chamber during selection in Auschwitz-Birkenau. Bernard survived the Nazi concentration camps of Płaszów, Julag, Mauthausen, Auschwitz-Birkenau, and Dachau. During this time he was separated first from his two brothers, Sam and Natan, and later also from his father who was murdered in Auschwitz-Birkenau. After the war, Bernard reunited with his two brothers.

In 1951 the Offen brothers emigrated to the United States. In 1981 Bernard returned to Poland for the first time since the war to confront the demons of his past. From 1991 on Bernard began to spend his summers in Kraków dealing with the past through what he calls the "process of healing". He started taking people on tours of the former ghetto, Płaszów and Auschwitz-Birkenau. His experiences Bernard documented in four movies. In 1992 Bernard gave close to an 8 hours recorded testimony by the Oral History Project of the United States Holocaust memorial Museum.

Austrian Holocaust Memorial Servants (Gedenkdieners) serving their Memorial Service in Kraków cooperate frequently with Bernard Offen and take part in his walks to the ghetto area and Płaszów camp.

== Tax resistance ==
In 1986, in a letter to the Internal Revenue Service, Offen told the agency that he would be refusing to pay 25% of his taxes and would forward that money instead to an alternative fund because his experiences in the Nazi extermination camps had made him unwilling to be an accomplice in the nuclear arms race that "could end life for 5,000,000,000 people, five billion Jews. For now the whole world is Jewish and nuclear devices are the gas ovens for the planet.... I will not willingly contribute to the production of nuclear devices. They are more lethal than the gas Zyklon B, the gas that killed my father and countless others."

== Filmography ==
- The Work (1983)
- My Hometown Concentration Camp (1997) A book carrying the same name was published in 2008
- Process B-7815 (1999)
- Hawaii and the Holocaust (2004)
