= Singing in the Dark =

1956 film by Max Nosseck

- Screenshot from the film, showing Leo pursuing a nightclub career
- Directed by: Max Nosseck
- Written by: Ann Hood (writer); Aben Kandel (adaptation); Stephen Kandel (writer); Max Nosseck and Moyshe Oysher (story)
- Produced by: Joey Adams
- Starring: Moyshe Oysher, Phyllis Hill, Joey Adams
- Cinematography: Boris Kaufman
- Music by: Moyshe Oysher
- Release date: March 7, 1956
- Country: United States
- Language: English

Singing in the Dark is a 1956 American black-and-white film about a Holocaust survivor suffering from total amnesia who comes to the United States. It stars Yiddish language film actor Moishe Oysher in his only English-language film performance, comedian Joey Adams (born Joseph Abramowitz), who was also executive producer, and his wife, future gossip columnist Cindy Adams, and was directed by Max Nosseck.

== Plot ==
Leo is a Holocaust survivor who suffers from total amnesia. When he immigrates to the U.S. he manages to find a job as a hotel desk clerk. When he accepts a drink in the hotel bar, he suddenly starts singing, amazing those around him—and himself—with his magnificent voice. Taking advantage of his gift, he begins singing in nightclubs. Eventually, with the help of a psychiatrist and partly as a result of a blow to the head during a mugging, his memories begin to return, and he realizes that he is the son of a great Jewish Hazzan in Europe. As memories of his parents, who were murdered in the Holocaust, return to him, he abandons his nightclub career to follow his father's footsteps as a synagogue cantor.

The final scene shows Leo (who now remembers that his real name is "David") singing during a synagogue service.

In one crucial scene in the movie, Leo imagines himself ascending the bimah of a ruined synagogue in Europe, singing the ancient Jewish prayer "El male rachamim" remembering all the Jews who were murdered in the Holocaust. By actually returning to the synagogue as a cantor, the film shows how he is restoring "the sacred music of a vanquished culture to a living Jewish community."

== Cast ==
- Moyshe Oysher as David aka Leo/his father
- Phyllis Hill as Ruth
- Joey Adams as Joey Napoleon
- Henry Sharp as Dr. A. Neumann
- Mickey Knox as Harry - handsome tough
- Dave Starr as Larry - ugly tough
- Lawrence Tierney as Biff Lamont
- Kay Medford as Luli
- Abe Simon as The Killer
- Cindy Adams, as Biff's Mistress, credited as Cindy Heller

== Importance ==
The National Center for Jewish Film notes that this "important and virtually unknown independent film" is one of the first American movies to focus on the Holocaust. It is one of the films featured in the 2004 documentary "Imaginary Witness: Hollywood and the Holocaust."

Academy Award-winning cinematographer Boris Kaufman filmed this movie in post-war Berlin, including the remains of the city's Neue Synagogue. The film also includes footage of New York's Rivington Street Synagogue.

== Response ==
While the historical importance of this film is widely noted, reviews for the film itself were mixed. The 1956 New York Times review was generally favorable, calling it "light socko" and noting both "Runyonesque and Second Avenue overtones." It ends with the description, "Mr. Adams is no Sir Laurence Olivier but he's an expert at the wisecrack and the fast gag. Mr. Oysher, histrionically a bit heavy, can render a snappy tune or a Hebraic chant with richness. All in all, "Singing in the Dark" is light 'socko.'" The National Center for Jewish Film calls it "a quirky mix of 1950s American film genres—the musical, gangster, and mystery movie—and the period's fascination with psychiatry. While Jews are not discussed directly, Jewish content is explicit, especially in the popular Yiddish songs (sung in English) and liturgical Hebrew songs."

== Re-release ==
A newly restored 2011 copy was scheduled for screenings at a number of film festivals in the U.S. and overseas, including the Kulture Festival, Florida State University (March, 2011), the New York Jewish Film Festival (2011), and the Jerusalem International Film Festival (July, 2010).
