= Matej Mináč =

Slovak film director

Matej Mináč in 2018

Matej Mináč (born 1961) is a Slovak film director.

== Early life and family ==
Matej Mináč was born in Czechoslovakia. His mother is photographer Zuzana Mináčová, and his brother is mathematician Ján Mináč.

== Career ==
Mináč has directed three films about Sir Nicholas Winton, a Briton who organised the rescue of 669 Jewish children from German-occupied Czechoslovakia on the eve of World War II, in an operation later known as the Czech Kindertransport. In the drama All My Loved Ones (1999), the role of Winton was played by Rupert Graves. The documentary The Power of Good: Nicholas Winton (2002) won an Emmy Award. The third documentary about Winton was Nicky's Family (2011). and Children Saved from the Nazis: The Story of Sir Nicholas Winton (2016).

Mináč also made a full-length documentary with feature re-enactments, Through the Eyes of the Photographer (2015), about the Slovak photographer Zuzana Mináčová, his mother.

== Awards ==
- International EMMY Award for Best Documentary in 2002 (awarded by the International Academy of Television, Arts and Sciences – New York 2002)
- Nominated for the 2006 News and Documentary EMMY AWARD for HBO
- 2006 Christopher Award – New York for an extraordinary humanistic message
- 2009 CFTA Award within the Czech Lion for the best documentary from 1993 to 2007
- Wallenberg Medal – together with Patrik Pašš, award for the extraordinarily sensitively processed story of Sir Winton, thanks to which his message inspires people all over the world
- Best Documentary Award – Montreal World Film Festival 2011
- Audience Rights Award – Karlovy Vary IFF 2011
- Audio-Visual Memory Preservation Forum Award – Jerusalem Film Festival 2011
- SIGNIS Award World Catholic Association for Communication, uniting 140 countries, for the promotion and dissemination of human values – 64th PRIX ITALIA – Turin
- FIAT / IFTA (Achievement Award) for the best use of archives – British Film Institute, London 2012
- Grand Prix to director Matej Mináč for the discovering and human-deep theme of the film Nicky's Family – 52nd IFF of Films for Children and Youth Zlín – Czech Republic
- Award – David's Camera for the best music – Warsaw Jewish Film Festival, Poland
- Shoresh Audience Award – UK Jewish Film Festival, London, UK
- Audience Award – Palm Beach Jewish Film Festival – United States
- Audience Award – Best Documentary Feature Film 2012 – Sedona International Film Festival – United States
- Audience Award – Best Documentary Feature 2012 – Atlanta Jewish Film Festival – United States
- Audience Award – Best Film 2012 – Charlotte Jewish Film Festival – United States
- Audience Award – Best Documentary 2012 – Denver Jewish Film Festival – United States
- Audience Award – Best Documentary Film 2012 – AJC Seattle Jewish Film Festival – United States
- Audience Award – Best Film 2012 – Houston Jewish Film Festival – United States
- Audience Award – Best Documentary Film -Hartford Jewish Film Festival
- Audience Award – Best Documentary 2012 – Pittsburgh Jewish Film Festival
- Audience Award – Best Film 2012 – Rockland International Jewish Film Festival, United States
- Audience Award for Best Documentary – Zagreb Jewish Film Festival 2012, Croatia
- Award for the best director for the masterful use of narrative techniques, where the film story is presented through the personal perspective of the director – MECEFF festival – Romania
- Award of the Mayor of Piešťany – IFF Piešťany – Cinematik – 2011
- Ota Hofman Award of the Children's Film Festival and Television Festival in Ostrov – 2001
- Special jury prize for the work with the most significant moral accent
- Ota Hofman Children's Film and Television Festival – Ostrov – 2001
- Slovak Film Critics Award – in the category of Slovak feature and medium-length documentary with its premiere in 2011, Slovakia
- Creative Award for Film and Documentary Production – Annual National Creative Awards of the Slovak Film Association, the Union of Slovak Television Producers and the Literary Fund, Slovakia
- Audience Award – Best Film 2012, Scottsdale International Film Festival, United States
- GRAND PRIX – Best Film Festival, XVII International TV Festival Bar, Montenegro
- The best collection of films – Award for Czech Television, part of the collection is Nicky's family, XVII International TV Festival Bar, Montenegro
- Audience Award – Best Film, Three Rivers Film Festival 2012, United States
- Best Documentary Audience Award, Dayton Jewish International Film Festival 2013, United States
- Audience Award – Best Film – 10th European Film Festival, Buenos Aires, Argentina, 2013
- Russian Journalists Association Award – Yalta, 2013
- Audience Award – Best Documentary, Jewish Arts & Film Festival of Fairfield County 2013
- Award for Best Documentary, Victoria Film Festival 2014
- SPECIAL AWARD for director and ASPIM EUROPA AWARD at Torino
- International film festival The Spirits of the Earth – 2014
- FITES Award – TRILOBIT (Czech Film and Television Association)
- IGRIC Award (Slovak Film Association, Union of Slovak Television Producers)
- Jury Prize – Troia International Film Festival – Portugal
- Nine Gates Festival Award
- First prize – Warsaw Jewish Film Festival – Poland
- Spirit Award – Pacific Jewish Film Festival – United States
- Audience Awards: Washington Jewish Film Festival, Miami Jewish Film Festival
- Troia International Film Festival – Portugal – Jury Prize,
- Coachella Valley's Festival – Best Film (United States)
- Grand Prix – Sedona International Film Festival, United States;
- Czech lion for Jiří Bartoška for the best supporting role,
- IGRIC 2000 Award of the Slovak Film Association
- Audience Awards: Palm Springs International Film Festival – United States (rated by the audience as the second best film of 180 feature films, Finále Plzeň Film Festival, Washington Jewish Film Festival, São Paulo Jewish Film Festival, Festivals of Festivals – Palm Springs (2001), Würzburg Film Festival (Germany, 2002), Atlanta Jewish Film Festival (2002)
- Award – Camera of David, best documentary and
- Main prize – for the 13th Warsaw Jewish Film Festival (November 2015)
- Golden Remi Award for Best Documentary at the 49th Annual International Film Festival – WORLDFEST HOUSTON
