= All My Loved Ones =

- Directed by: Matěj Mináč
- Written by: Matěj Mináč; Jiří Hubač
- Starring: Rupert Graves
- Cinematography: Dodo Simoncic
- Release date: 21 October 1999
- Running time: 91 min.
- Countries: Czech Republic; Slovakia; Poland
- Language: Czech

All My Loved Ones (Czech: Všichni moji blízcí) is a 1999 Czech-language film directed by Matěj Mináč. It was an international co-production between Poland, the Czech Republic and Slovakia. It was Slovakia's official Best Foreign Language Film submission at the 72nd Academy Awards, but did not manage to receive a nomination.

== Plot ==
It is the story of an upwardly-mobile Jewish-Czech family before Nazi Germany invasion of Czechoslovakia. After initial denial about the looming danger, the family is unable to find a way out of the country upon realizing the reality of the imminent Nazi threat. An uncle in the family meets Nicholas Winton, the (real life) British humanitarian who, just before the start of the Second World War, organized the rescue of several hundred Jewish children from German-occupied Czechoslovakia and likely death in the Holocaust. The operation was later known as the Czech Kindertransport. The storyline focuses heavily on Silberstein family members, with Nicholas Winton (portrayed by Rupert Graves) appearing briefly in key scenes near the end of the film.

== Development ==
Mináč got the idea for "a film about what preceded the war from the perspective of a child" from stories recounted by his mother. For further inspiration, he visited the Jewish Museum in Prague and read Vera Gissing's Pearls of My Childhood, which briefly mentioned Nicholas Winton rescuing hundreds of children before the war. From this Mináč wrote a treatment. When he asked Alice Klimova to translate the treatment into English, she informed him that she was one of the rescued children and that Winton was still alive. After meeting him, Mináč became determined to not only make his original film idea, but also to make the documentary The Power of Good: Nicholas Winton.

== Cast ==
- Rupert Graves as Nicholas Winton
- Josef Abrhám as Jakub Silberstein
- Jiří Bartoška as Samuel
- Libuse Safránková as Irma
- Hanna Dunowska as Eva Marie
- Krzysztof Kolberger as Leo
- Tereza Brodská as Hedvika
- Krzysztof Kowalewski as Rous
- Marián Labuda as Helmut Spitzer
- Agnieszka Wagner as Anna
- Jiří Pecha as Amavite Puel
- Grazyna Wolszczak as Angelika
- Ondřej Vetchý as Max
- Brano Holicek as David
- Lucia Culkova as Sosa
