= Hitler's Children (2011 film) =

- Directed by: Chanoch Zeevi
- Written by: Chanoch Zeevi
- Produced by: Chanoch Zeevi
- Cinematography: Yoram Millo
- Edited by: Arik Leibovitz
- Music by: Ophir Leibovitch
- Production companies: Maya Productions; Saxonia Entertainment
- Distributed by: Film Movement (US)
- Release dates: 1 May 2011 (Israel); November 2011 (IDFA); 16 November 2012 (US)
- Running time: 83 minutes
- Countries: Israel; Germany
- Language: English

Hitler's Children is an Israeli-German 2011 documentary film directed by Chanoch Zeevi that portrays how relatives of Adolf Hitler's inner circle deal with the burden of that relationship and the identification of their surnames with the Holocaust. They describe the conflicted feelings of guilt and responsibility they carry with them in their daily lives and the disparate reactions of their siblings and other family members.

The film features Katrin Himmler, Rainer Höss, and Niklas Frank.

== Synopsis ==
The film consists primarily of interviews with the descendants of several of the most powerful figures in the Nazi regime, including Heinrich Himmler, Hans Frank, Hermann Göring, Amon Göth and Rudolf Höss, whose ties of kinship associate them with notorious criminals. Amongst them are Bettina Goering, Katrin Himmler, Monika Hertwig, Rainer Höss, Eldad Beck and Niklas Frank.

They discuss the delicate balance they have managed to achieve in negotiating between the natural bonds between children and parents and earlier generations on the one hand and their innate revulsion at their crimes. It also includes documentary footage of one's visit to Auschwitz, others speaking with relatives, or visiting schools to talk about their personal and family histories. Their personalities and personal histories are varied and have produced a range of solutions as some have decided to discuss their situation in public–several have authored books–or decided whether or not to keep the family name, to have children, to live in Germany, or celebrate their German heritage. The film also explores one's relationship to the victims of the Holocaust.

== Release ==
Hitler's Children was completed in 2011 and was produced by Zeevi's company Maya Production, in co-production with the German company Saxonia Entertainment. The film was first broadcast on Israeli Channel 2 on 1 May 2011, the eve of the Israeli Holocaust Memorial Day, and was first shown internationally in November 2011 at the International Documentary Film Festival Amsterdam. The documentary has been shown at several documentary film festivals and has been presented by a number of TV broadcasters, including BBC2, ORF and the Swedish network Kunskapskanalen.

The film reached the finals in the category of Best TV Programmes Broadcast in Europe in the Prix Europa 2012 competition.

== Critical response ==
The documentary received critical acclaim in several UK newspapers after being broadcast on BBC2 on 23 May 2012.

The film won the 2012 Boston Jewish Film Festival Audience Award for Best Documentary film.

== Production ==
According to Zeevi, a personal meeting with Hitler's former secretary, Traudl Junge, in 1999, triggered the film. He said: "When I sat in front of her I suddenly understood that the need to try and understand the evil that led to the horrors of the Holocaust was an integral part of the narrative. I understood that the dialogue with the 'other side' can teach us many new things on the fertile ground on which the hatred grew and in parallel convey a message of hope for the future". He said he hoped to provoke discussion of the Holocaust "in an intelligent manner and from a new point of view" and to "provide an indisputable answer to Holocaust deniers". The film's production was led by Maya Productions LTD. in co-production with Saxonia Entertainment, with project financing provided by Capital International LTD. The film's marketing support was handled by Kalman Sporn.

== See also ==
- 2 or 3 Things I Know About Him, 2007 documentary by Malte Ludin about his father, Hanns Ludin, Nazi ambassador to Slovakia, and the family's attempt to come to terms, or not, with the war crimes that led to his 1947 execution.
- The Commandant's Shadow, 2024 documentary about Höss's children and grandchildren
- Inheritance (2006 film)
