= Gerhard Palitzsch =

German SS soldier

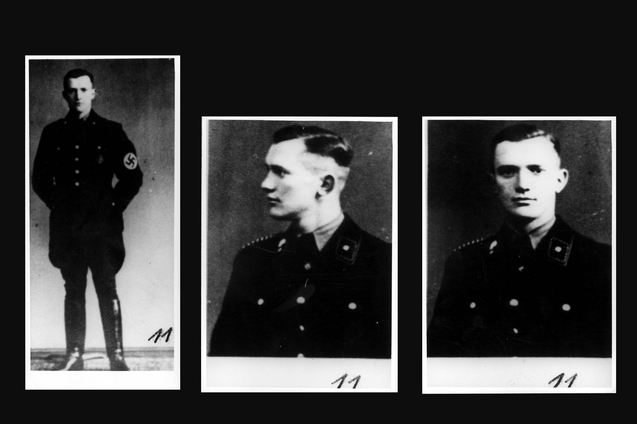
- Born: 17 June 1913; Großopitz, German Empire
- Died: 7 December 1944 (aged 31); Budapest, Hungary
- Cause of death: Killed in action
- Political party: Nazi Party
- Status: Deceased
- Convictions: Racial defilement Theft
- Penalty: Imprisonment; commuted to service in a penal battalion
- SS service
- Branch: Death's Head Units
- Service years: 1933–November 1944
- Rank: Hauptscharführer
- Commands: Block Leader and Report Leader in Sachsenhausen; Report Leader in Auschwitz; Camp Leader in Subcamp Brünn, Protectorate of Bohemia and Moravia (now Brno, Czech Republic)

Gerhard Palitzsch (17 June 1913 – 7 December 1944) was a German non-commissioned officer (NCO) of the SS. He was notorious for his brutal treatment of prisoners in Auschwitz concentration camp.

== Biography ==
At the beginning of his career as an NCO, in 1933, Palitzsch served as a sentry in the concentration camps of Lichtenburg, Sachsenburg and Sachsenhausen, where in 1936 he was Block Leader (head of a prisoners’ barrack), and later Report Leader (duty officer). From 1938 to 1940 he served in Neuengamme concentration camp as the second prisoners' work detail overseer (Kommandoführer).

From Sachsenhausen he was transferred to Auschwitz on 20 May 1940. He brought with him 30 German green-coded prisoners (criminals), selected by him to take over posts of authority over the rest of prisoners. Palitzsch was the first Report Leader and in this position he practised extensive terror. Infamous were his speeches to the newly arrived prisoners at the camp. Here is an example:

″We Germans have no pity on the enemies of the Third Reich, like you. With joy we will hound you all through the chimneys of the crematoria. Forget your wives, your children, your families. You will die here like dogs.″

Moreover, Palitzsch was the most assiduous killer at the "death wall", called also the "black wall". He claimed to a fellow SS member that he was responsible for shooting some 25,000 people in the back of the head. The prisoner Boleslaw Zbozien testified how Palitzsch murdered a family of five:

″The man was holding by the hand the child standing on his left. The other child stood between them and they [the father and the mother] were holding him too by their hands. The mother kept the youngest, a baby, tight to her chest. Palitzsch shot the baby in the head first. Then Palitzsch shot the child standing between his parents. The man and the woman stood motionless like statues. Then Palitzsch seized the oldest child, who did not want to be shot; he threw the child to the ground, and standing on his back, Palitzsch shot him in the nape. Finally he shot the woman and then the man.

On 3 September 1941 Palitzsch participated in the first tentative gassing using Zyklon B to murder 600 Russian POWs and 250 sick Polish prisoners. They were crammed in the basement of Block 13, later renamed Block 11. But the next day not all prisoners were dead; so Palitzsch had to add more Zyklon B. In 1942 he was Report Leader in the male camp of Auschwitz II Birkenau, where he served also at the trackside ramp when new Jewish transports were arriving. From July to August 1943 he served also in the Gypsy family camp.

In a report by a Polish resistance fighter (Witold Pilecki, inmate no. 4859) who volunteered to enter Auschwitz in September 1940, reported genocidal actions from November 1940 onwards and escaped in April 1943 it reads: "In Block 11, Palitzsch, a particularly dedicated torturer, would hunt children. He told girls to run around a closed yard and would shoot at them, killing them like rabbits. He would snatch a child from its mother’s embrace and would smash its little head against a wall, or a stone. A true degenerate, tears and death followed him. Having committed a most heinous crime, he would come out smiling, handsome and polite, calmly smoking a cigarette."

Like other concentration camp personnel he enriched himself by stealing the property robbed from the victims and because of this he was a subject of SS investigations into theft and corruption. His transfer in 1943 to a sub-camp at Brünn, Protectorate of Bohemia and Moravia (now Brno, Czech Republic), where he was made the Commandant, may have been a penal transfer.

Some prisoners in more trusted jobs in Auschwitz fought back against the camp; one of the means of attack was to breed lice infected with typhus in the camp infirmary and then put these lice into clothes given to SS personnel. Because of his notoriety, Palitzsch was given such an item. He did not contract typhus, but his wife Luise died from it. After that, he was believed to have sexually assaulted a female prisoner. Shortly after his transfer to Brünn he was arrested, sent back to Auschwitz, and jailed in Block 11. Accused of racial defilement and theft, Palitzsch was sentenced to several years in prison, but reprieved and instead dismissed from the SS in June 1944 and sent to a penal unit. His later fate is unclear; he is said to have fallen in action on 7 December 1944, possibly at the battle of Budapest.

In a letter from the resistance movement, smuggled out of Auschwitz, he was described as “the greatest bastard of Auschwitz”. Rudolf Höss, who was not hesitant in his criticism of his staff, wrote in his memoirs: ″Palitzsch was the most cunning and slippery creature that I have ever gotten to know and experience in the many concentration camps. He literally walked over bodies to satisfy his hunger for power.″
