= The Commandant's Shadow =

2024 film by Daniela Volker

- Theatrical release poster
- Directed by: Daniela Völker
- Produced by: Daniela Völker; Gloria Abramoff
- Starring: Hans-Jürgen Höss; Kai Uwe Höss; Anita Lasker-Wallfisch
- Production companies: Snowstorm Productions; Creators Inc.
- Distributed by: HBO Documentary Films; Warner Bros. Pictures; Fathom Events
- Release date: May 29, 2024 (United States)
- Running time: 103 minutes
- Countries: United Kingdom; United States
- Language: English

The Commandant's Shadow is a 2024 documentary film directed and produced by Daniela Völker. The film focuses on the story of Jurgen Höss, the son of Auschwitz concentration camp director Rudolf Höss, and his boyhood home life in the villa adjacent to it. The film also stars Anita Lasker-Wallfisch, an Auschwitz survivor who meets face-to-face with Jurgen Höss decades later. The Commandant's Shadow drew media comparisons to the 2023 film The Zone of Interest, a dramatization similarly focusing on the Höss family's life adjacent to Auschwitz.

Snowstorm, Creators Inc., and New Mandate Films produced the movie. HBO Documentary Films and Warner Bros. Pictures acquired distribution rights in April 2024 with Fathom Events partnering to give the film a limited release in the United States on May 29 and 30, 2024.

== Reception ==
On the review aggregator website Rotten Tomatoes, 92% of 24 critics' reviews are positive, with an average rating of 7.5/10. The film earned a score of 76 on critical aggregator website Metacritic based on five critics' reviews, indicating "generally favorable" response.

Nick Schager of The Daily Beast called the film "an overpowering work of excavation and confrontation—as well as a timely and urgent warning about the continuing threat of antisemitism." Leslie Combemale of the Alliance of Women Film Journalists wrote that "this documentary has such a powerful hold, it's hard to shake even days later."

== See also ==
- 2 or 3 Things I Know About Him, 2005 German documentary by Malte Ludin about his family's view of his father, wartime German ambassador to Slovakia executed for war crimes there in 1947
- Hitler's Children, 2011 Israeli documentary about second and third generations in the families of prominent Nazis, including Höss.
