= What Our Fathers Did: A Nazi Legacy =

- Poster
- Directed by: David Evans
- Written by: Philippe Sands
- Produced by: Finola Dwyer; Amanda Posey
- Cinematography: Sam Hardy; Philipp Blaubach
- Edited by: David Charap
- Music by: Malcolm Lindsay
- Distributed by: Oscilloscope Laboratories
- Release date: November 6, 2015 (United States)
- Running time: 92 minutes 96 minutes
- Country: United Kingdom
- Languages: English; Ukrainian

What Our Fathers Did: A Nazi Legacy is a 2015 British documentary about Niklas Frank and Horst von Wachter, the respective sons of Hans Frank and Otto Wächter, the latter two members of the Nazi Party during The Holocaust and World War II. The documentary was directed by David Evans.

== Participants ==
- Niklas Frank
- Horst von Wachter
- Philippe Sands

== Release ==
The film was released in U.S. theaters on November 6, 2015.

== Reception ==
The film has an 87% rating on Rotten Tomatoes based on 30 reviews. Nick Allen of RogerEbert.com awarded the film three and a half stars. Clayton Dillard of Slant Magazine awarded the film two stars out of four. Gary Garrison of IndieWire graded the film a B.

Justin Chang of Variety gave the film a positive review, calling it "A troubling study of denial, wartime responsibility and the challenge of dealing with a monster in the family."

The Hollywood Reporter also gave the film a positive review: "A fairly specialized picture in a sea of Holocaust material, Legacy is novel and professionally made enough to have value at fests and on video; it also offers psychological insights of interest to those who have no interest in another WWII-related doc."
