= 2 or 3 Things I Know About Him =

2005 film by Malte Ludin

- Film poster
- German: 2 oder 3 Dinge, die ich von ihm weiß
- Directed by: Malte Ludin
- Written by: Malte Ludin
- Produced by: Iva Svarcova
- Starring: Hanns Ludin
- Edited by: Malte Ludin; Iva Svarcova
- Music by: Werner Pirchner; Hakim Ludin; Jaroslav Nohavica
- Release dates: 12 February 2005 (Berlin International Film Festival); 7 April 2005 (Germany)
- Running time: 85 minutes
- Languages: German; Slovak

2 or 3 Things I Know About Him (German: 2 oder 3 Dinge, die ich von ihm weiß) is a documentary film in which German director Malte Ludin examines the impact of Nazism in his family. Malte's father, Hanns Ludin, was the Third Reich's ambassador to Slovakia. As such, he signed deportation orders that sent thousands of Jews to Auschwitz. Hanns Ludin was executed for war crimes in 1947.

== Production ==
Malte Ludin did not undertake this film until after the death of his mother, Erla. The documentary does include clips of earlier interviews he conducted with Erla, however. Malte also interviews his sisters, who recall their father with some fondness.

== Synopsis ==
A German filmmaker forces his siblings to come to terms with their father's Nazi past. Despite documentary evidence of Hanns Ludin's direct involvement in the deportation of thousands of Slovak Jews to their deaths, director Malte Ludin's sisters remain in various phases of denial about their dad. His older sister, Barbel, is a particularly staunch denier of any complicity on the part of the elder Ludin, who served as Adolf Hitler's ambassador to Slovakia during World War II.

The film exposes the spectrum of reaction to the Holocaust among the post-war generation in Germany. While Ludin confronts his father, and Germany's, guilt full-on, his sister Barbel continually refuses to concede the most basic points about the mass slaughter of millions of Jews by the Nazis.

== Release ==
2 oder 3 Dinge, die ich von ihm weiß was first shown in 2005. In 2007, it was released as 2 or 3 Things I Know About Him in Manhattan by the National Center for Jewish Film. It opened at Film Forum on January 24, 2007, and was paired with Torte Bluma, an English-language short by Benjamin Ross.

== Reception ==
The film was received well by critics. As of July 2020, the film holds a 100% approval rating on Rotten Tomatoes, based on six reviews with an average rating of 8/10.

== See also ==
- Hitler's Children, 2011 Israeli film about second- and third-generation descendants of prominent Nazis
- The Commandant's Shadow, 2024 documentary about the descendants of Auschwitz commandant Rudolf Höss, ending with one of his sons meeting a survivor.
