= Eleonore Hodys =

Austrian Auschwitz survivor (1903–1964)

- Born: 10 August 1903; Vienna, Austria-Hungary
- Died: 1964 (aged 60–61); Vienna, Austria
- Other name: Nora Mattaliano-Hodys
- Citizenship: Austria
- Known for: Surviving Auschwitz
- Political party: Communist

Eleonore Hodys (10 August 1903 – 1964) was a communist political prisoner in Auschwitz who became the sex slave of Nazi commandant Rudolf Höss, was impregnated twice by him, and eventually escaped. She would give testimony of her experiences during the Nuremberg Trials investigating the Holocaust.

== Biography ==
Hodys was born in Vienna, Austria-Hungary, on 10 August 1903, to a Catholic family and would become a physician. In 1939, she was tried by the Nazi government and convicted of fraud and being an 'illegal member' of the NSDAP between 1928 and 1938 and placed in Lübeck-Lauerhof prison.

During the course of World War II, Hodys was sent to Ravensbrück before being taken to Auschwitz on one of the first transports in 1942. As a political prisoner of Aryan descent, she was put to work within the villa of the SS Commandant, Rudolf Höss. She reported that he quickly took an interest in her, granting additional privileges, until his first attempt at beginning an affair in May 1942. Eventually she was impregnated by him and, in order to avoid the scandal, he sent her to be starved in a standing prison cell, with orders to gas her if necessary to avoid discovery. Eventually, she was forced to have an abortion in the camp hospital instead of being executed. This event would be recalled against him during the Nuremberg Trials in part to disprove his claims of being a normal and moral family man.

In the summer of 1944, Höss gave orders to kill Hodys but a judicial investigation halted the order and sparked a full investigation. Due to the affair, claims of corruption, and his handling of the camp, Höss was put under investigation by SS judge Georg Konrad Morgen. Despite Heinrich Himmler attempting to halt the investigations, Hodys was brought forth, investigated, and called in to testify against Höss in the autumn of 1944.

Following the war, these events would resurface in testimony, as Hodys and Morgen, and several others, were called to testify against Höss and others. Hodys' testimony would prove key not only in the conviction of Höss, but would also prove decisive in the Grabner case.

Hodys died in Vienna in 1964.

== Legacy ==
Rainer Höss, the grandson of Rudolf Höss, has become an active voice in Holocaust education and preaching tolerance, openly sharing the story of his grandfather's sex slave. This includes sharing the discovery in Vienna of Hodys's estate. It comprised a box that had gloves and uniforms with Rudolf Höss's initials on them, as well as a 153-gram (5.4 oz) gold ring with the same initials that was made of the gold taken from teeth of Jewish prisoners in Auschwitz.

Although several books have mentioned her experience in Auschwitz and the court investigation, there have been books specifically devoted to researching and relating Hodys's story.
