= Niklas Frank =

German author and journalist (born 1939)

- Born: 9 March 1939 (age 87); Munich, Bavaria, Germany
- Occupations: Author and journalist
- Father: Hans Frank
- Writing career
- Notable works: Hitler's Children; In the Shadow of the Reich

Niklas Frank (born 9 March 1939) is a German author and journalist best known for an intimate and strongly accusatory book about his father, Hans Frank, a lawyer and Nazi official who was in charge of the General Government in German-occupied Poland during World War II.

== Background ==
Frank was born in Munich on 9 March 1939 to Hans Frank and Brigitte Herbst as the youngest of five children. His brothers and sisters were Sigrid (1927–d. in South Africa), Norman (1928–2010), Brigitte (1935–1981), and Michael (1937–1990). When Niklas was about eight months old, his father was appointed Hitler's Governor-General of the General Government in German-occupied Poland. In this position, Hans Frank became responsible for the Nazi policy of enslaving the Poles and exterminating the Polish Jews. Niklas grew up in Cracow, Poland. He was seven years old when his father was executed in the Nuremberg trials (16 October 1946). By then, he had been shunned by his father due to Hans's belief that he was instead the son of a former family friend, Karl Lasch, and was closer to his nanny Hilde.

Contrary to his father's later stance on the concentration camps and ghettos, his children were not isolated from them, despite their parents not discussing them directly with them. Niklas was often taken to a concentration camp by Hilde, their nanny. On one occasion, for Niklas and his brother Norman's enjoyment, the guards made undernourished prisoners sit on a donkey, which would then be made to jump and throw them to the ground. Niklas would also be told that a sad prisoner was a "witch", whom he did not have to worry about, since she would be “dead very soon". At another point, a Polish servant soiled bed sheets with soot, and his mother screamed that he would be sent to the camps. Niklas, who had befriended the Pole, heard this and began to cry, which made his mother stop scolding the man and start comforting her son. In the end, she let the matter go, and after the war, the surviving Polish man and his wife would credit Niklas with saving their lives.

His mother died in 1959. Niklas studied German literature, sociology, and history, and became a journalist, working for the German edition of Playboy and for the weekly Stern. Over the course of the years, his initial embarrassment about his father developed into a "burning, obsessive hatred" as he uncovered minute details of his father's life during a 40-year search. In the early 1990s, Frank was still working as a journalist, after a career during which he interviewed, among others, the Polish trade-union leader, Lech Wałęsa.

As of 2025 he was retired and living in Ecklak, Schleswig-Holstein.

== Author ==
Frank contributed as a writer to the 1967 film A Degree of Murder and also to the 1973 Tatort television series episode Weißblaue Turnschuhe, but this would not have earned him lasting fame. In 1987, however, he published a book about his father, Der Vater: Eine Abrechnung ("The Father: A Settling of Accounts"), translated into English as In the Shadow of the Reich (1991). This book, serialized in the magazine Stern, caused controversy in Germany because of the unheard-of, savage way in which its author sought to utterly destroy the memory of his father, referring to him as "a slime-hole of a Hitler fanatic" and questioning his remorse before his execution. Together with Israeli author Joshua Sobol, Frank later wrote the play Der Vater (The Father), commissioned for the Wiener Festwochen (Vienna Festival). It was first performed in 1995 at the Theater an der Wien and directed by Paulus Manker. In it, the son exhumes the putrid corpse of his father Hans and revivifies him to answer for his deeds, while his 'phallic mother' (Brigitte) and Hitler are played by one and the same person. Having thus dealt with his father, Niklas Frank concentrated on his by then deceased mother, the once 'Queen of Poland', in his book My German Mother (2005), which reads in part like a satire of high-ranking Nazi women. He concluded his trilogy with Brother Norman! (2013), reporting the painful discussions with his eldest and favorite brother, who had died three years before, on their diverging views of a youth spent in occupied Poland and on filial love.

== Appearances in documentaries ==
Niklas Frank appears as himself in the 1993 television documentary Personenbeschreibung and also in the 2012 film, Hitler's Children. He also appeared in a 2015 BBC documentary, which was shown as an episode of Independent Lens, What Our Fathers Did: A Nazi Legacy that aired in May 2016. An April 2017 BBC HARDtalk programme was dedicated to him. He was also interviewed in the Hans Frank episode of Hitler's Most Wanted (Series 1, Episode 8, 2019).
