= Hans Frank =

German politician and war criminal (1900–1946)

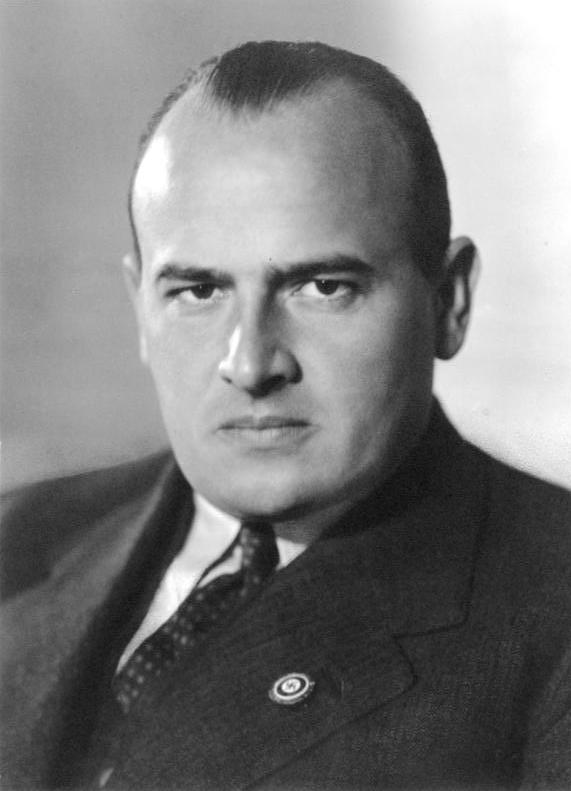
- Frank in 1939

Governor-General of the General Government
- In office 26 October 1939 – 19 January 1945
- Deputy: Arthur Seyss-Inquart (1939–1940); Josef Bühler (1940–1945)
- Preceded by: Office established
- Succeeded by: Office abolished

Reichsminister without portfolio
- In office 19 December 1934 – 30 April 1945
- Chancellor: Adolf Hitler

President of the Academy for German Law
- In office 2 October 1933 – 20 August 1942
- Preceded by: Office established
- Succeeded by: Otto Georg Thierack

Reichsleiter
- In office 2 June 1933 – 20 August 1942

Bavarian Minister of Justice
- In office 18 April 1933 – 4 December 1934
- Preceded by: Heinrich Spangenberger

Additional positions
- 1933–1945: Member of the Greater German Reichstag
- 1930–1933: Member of the Reichstag

Personal details
- Born: Hans Michael Frank; 23 May 1900 Karlsruhe, Germany
- Died: 16 October 1946 (aged 46) Nuremberg, Germany
- Party: Nazi Party
- Other political affiliations: German Workers' Party (DAP)
- Spouse: Brigitte Herbst (m. 1925)
- Children: 5, including Niklas
- Education: Ludwig-Maximilians-Universität München; Kiel University
- Profession: Lawyer

Military service
- Allegiance: German Empire
- Branch/service: Imperial German Army
- Battles/wars: World War I
- Criminal information
- Status: Executed by hanging
- Convictions: War crimes Crimes against humanity
- Trial: Nuremberg trials
- Penalty: Death

Details
- Span of crimes: 8 October 1939 – 19 January 1945
- Targets: Polish civilians Polish Jews

Hans Michael Frank (23 May 1900 – 16 October 1946) was a German Nazi politician, lawyer and convicted war criminal who served as the head of the General Government, an entity created by Germany on part of the German-occupied Polish lands during the Second World War.

Born in Karlsruhe, Frank was an early member of the German Workers' Party (DAP), the precursor of the Nazi Party (NSDAP). He took part in the failed Beer Hall Putsch, and later became Adolf Hitler's personal legal adviser as well as the lawyer of the NSDAP. In June 1933, he was named as a Reichsleiter (Reich Leader) of the party. In December 1934, Frank joined the Hitler Cabinet as a Reichsminister without portfolio.

After the German invasion of Poland in 1939, Frank was appointed Governor-General of the occupied Polish territories. During his tenure, he instituted a reign of terror against the civilian population and became directly involved in the mass murder of Jews. He engaged in the use of forced labour and oversaw four of the extermination camps. Frank remained head of the General Government until its collapse in early 1945. During that time, over four million people were murdered under his jurisdiction.

After the war, Frank was found guilty of war crimes and crimes against humanity at the Nuremberg trials. He was sentenced to death and executed by hanging in October 1946.

== Early years ==
Frank, the middle child of three, was born in Karlsruhe to Karl, a lawyer, and his wife, Magdalena (née Buchmaier), a daughter of a prosperous baker. He graduated from high school at Maximilians gymnasium in Munich. At seventeen he joined the German Army fighting in World War I, but did not serve time at the front.

After the war, Frank studied law and economics, from 1919 to the summer semester of 1921 at the Ludwig-Maximilians-Universität München, between 1921 and 1922 at Kiel University, and back from the winter semester 1922 to 1923 at the Ludwig-Maximilians-Universität München. On 21 July 1923, he passed the final exam there, obtaining his Dr. jur. degree in 1924.

Between 1919 and 1920, he was a member of the Thule Völkisch society. He served also in the Freikorps under Franz Ritter von Epp's command, taking part in the crackdown of the Münchner Räterepublik. In 1919, as did other members of the Thule Society, he joined the German Workers' Party (DAP) at its beginning.

== Nazi Party career ==
Although the DAP evolved quite soon into NSDAP (Nazi Party), Frank waited until September 1923 to become a member of the Sturmabteilung (SA), where he would eventually attain the rank of SA-Obergruppenführer in November 1937. In October 1923, he officially joined the NSDAP. In November of the same year, Frank took part in the "Beer Hall Putsch", the failed coup attempt intended to parallel Mussolini's March on Rome. In the aftermath of the attempted putsch, Frank fled to Austria, returning to Munich only in 1924, after the pending legal proceedings were stayed.

Frank rose to become Adolf Hitler's personal legal adviser. As the Nazis rose to power, Frank also served as the party's lawyer. He represented it in over 2,400 cases and spent over $10,000. This sometimes brought him into conflict with other lawyers. Once, a former teacher appealed to him: "I beg you to leave these people alone! No good will come of it! Political movements that begin in the criminal courts will end in the criminal courts!" In September–October 1930, Frank served as the defence lawyer at the court-martial in Leipzig of Lieutenants Richard Scheringer, Hans Friedrich Wendt and Hanns Ludin, three Reichswehr officers charged with membership in the NSDAP. The trial was a media sensation. Hitler himself testified and the defence successfully put the Weimar Republic itself on trial. Many Army officers developed a sympathetic view of the Nazi movement as a consequence. In October 1928, Frank founded the National Socialist German Jurists Association and became its leader. He was also elected to the Reichstag from electoral constituency 8, Leignitz, in October 1930 and retained this seat until the fall of the Nazi regime in May 1945.

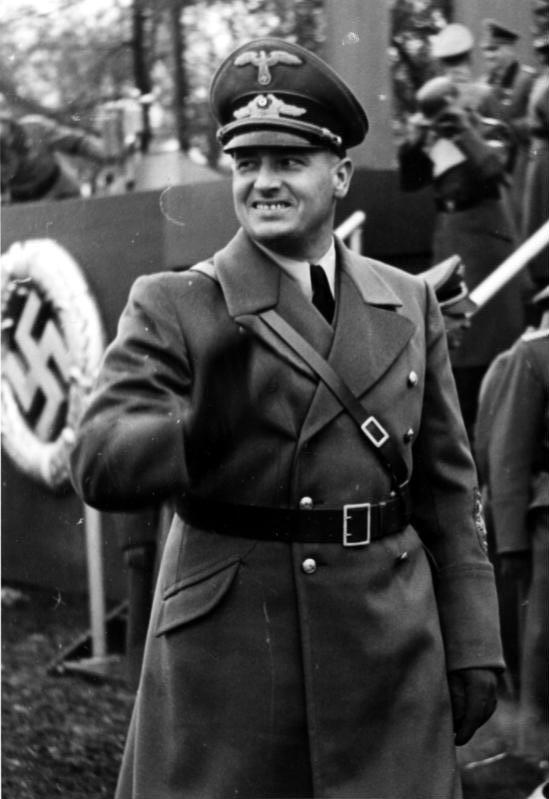
Head of the General Government in occupied Poland

On 10 March 1933, when the Nazis seized control of the Bavarian state government, Frank was made the Staatskommissar (State Commissioner) in charge of justice, and also was appointed one of the state's representatives to the Reichsrat until its abolition on 14 February 1934. In April 1933, he was appointed Minister of Justice for Bavaria, serving until December 1934 when he was named a Reichsminister without portfolio in the Reich government. On 2 June 1933, he was made a Reichsleiter, the second highest political rank in the Nazi Party, in his capacity as head of the party's legal affairs department. On 26 June 1933, Frank founded the Academy for German Law. At its inaugural meeting on 2 October 1933, he was named its Leader (renamed President on 9 August 1934) and would continue in this capacity until 20 August 1942 when he also left his positions as Reichsleiter and head of the Jurists Association. Frank also served as the Chairman of the Academy's Legal Philosophy Committee and was editor of its several publications. In January 1934, Frank was named as one of the three judges on the Supreme Party Court.

In March 1933, in a speech on the Bavarian radio, Frank issued "a greeting to his oppressed comrades in Austria" and threatened that, if necessary, the Nazi Party would "take over the safeguarding of the freedom of the German comrades in Austria". The Austrian government officially protested in Berlin, but Hitler denied responsibility for Frank's words. In May 1933, Frank went to Vienna, accompanied by the Prussian Minister of Justice Hanns Kerrl and his Ministerial Director Roland Freisler, to promote Nazi propaganda. Chancellor Engelbert Dollfuss declared their presence in Austria undesirable, and had them deported. In response, Hitler imposed the thousand-mark ban to weaken the Austrian economy, which was heavily dependent on tourism, and Austrian Nazis launched a wave of terrorist attacks, which ultimately led to the banning of the Nazi Party in Austria on 19 June 1933.

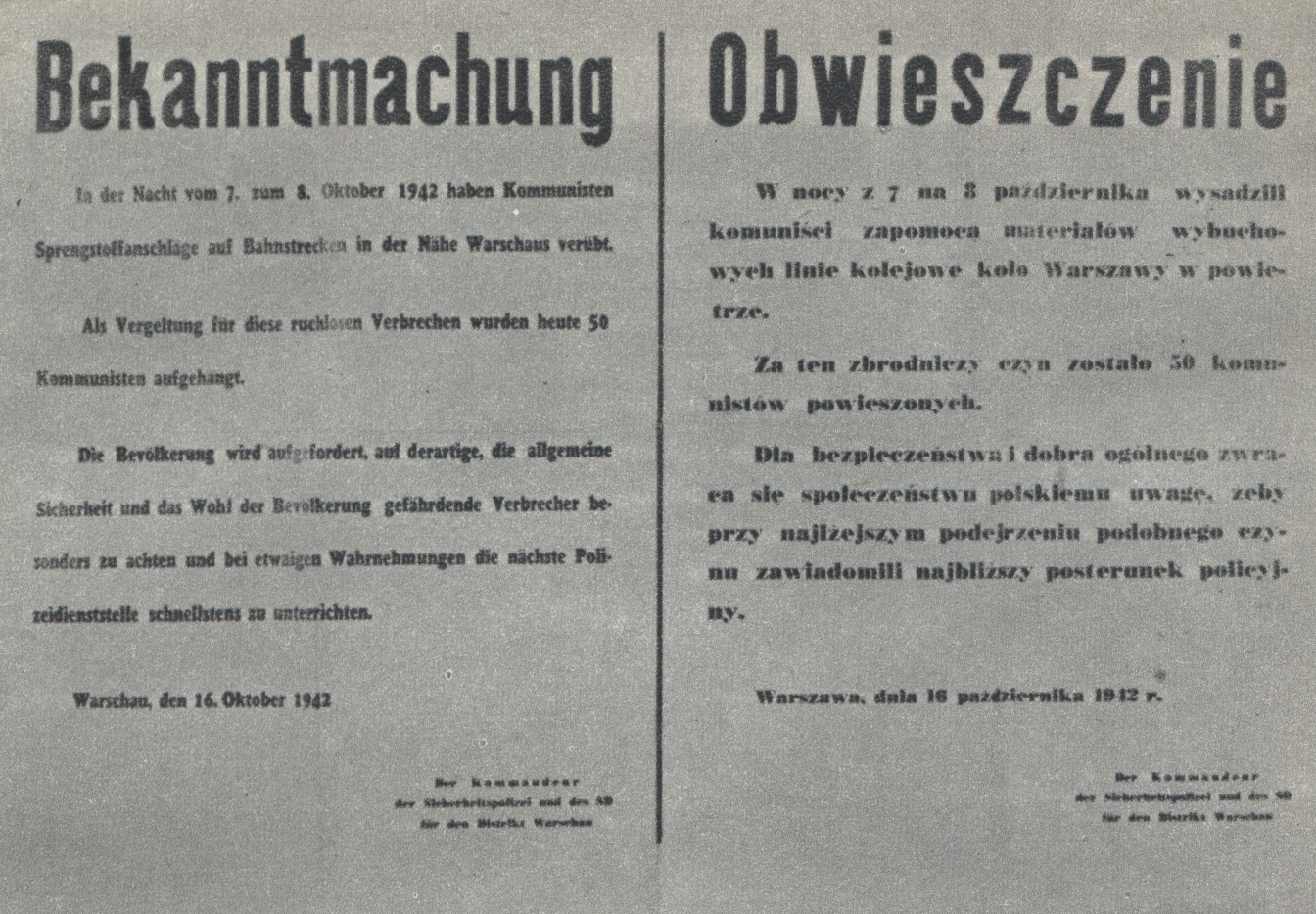
Announcement of the execution of 50 Polish hostages as a reprisal for blowing up railway lines near Warsaw

Frank objected to extrajudicial killings as it weakened the power of the legal system (of which he himself was a prominent member), both at the Dachau concentration camp and during the "Night of the Long Knives". Frank's view of what the judicial process required was that:

[The judge's] role is to safeguard the concrete order of the racial community, to eliminate dangerous elements, to prosecute all acts harmful to the community, and to arbitrate in disagreements between members of the community. The Nazi ideology, especially as expressed in the Party programme and in the speeches of our Leader, is the basis for interpreting legal sources.

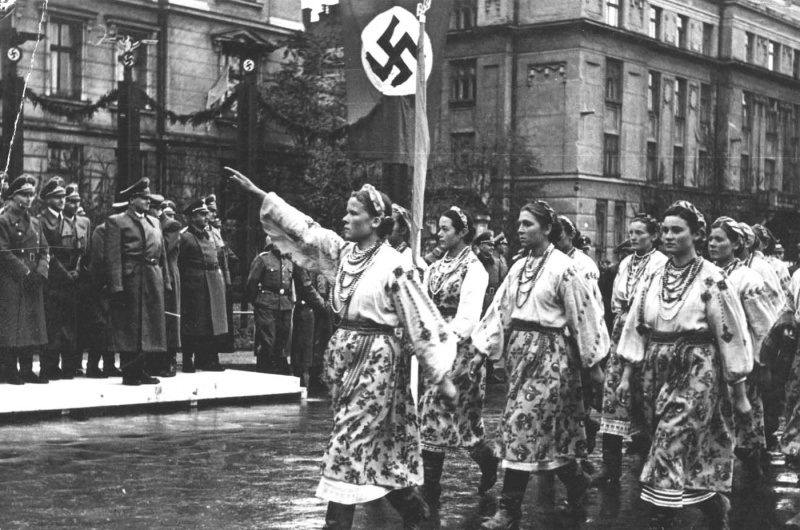
Frank visiting Stanislau (now Ivano-Frankivsk). Ukrainian nationalists parade in the streets of the city, October 1941

On 7 April 1938, Frank addressed some 10,000 Nazis at the Nibelungenhalle in Passau.

== Governor-General in Poland ==
In September 1939, Frank was assigned as Chief of Administration to Gerd von Rundstedt in the German military administration in occupied Poland. Beginning on 26 October 1939, following the completion of the invasion of Poland, Frank served as Governor-General of the occupied Polish territories, overseeing the General Government, the area of Poland not directly incorporated into Germany (roughly 90,000 km^{2} out of the 187,000 km^{2} Germany had gained).

Frank oversaw the segregation of the Jews into ghettos. From the outset, Jews were discriminated against savagely and the rations given to them were slender. He oversaw the Warsaw Ghetto and the use of Polish civilians as forced labour. In 1942, he lost his positions of authority outside the General Government after annoying Hitler with a series of speeches in Berlin, Vienna, Heidelberg, and Munich and as part of a power struggle with Friedrich-Wilhelm Krüger, the State Secretary for Security – head of the SS and the police in the General Government. Krüger himself was ultimately replaced by Wilhelm Koppe.

On 16 December 1941, Frank spelt out to his senior officials the approaching annihilation of the Jews:

A great Jewish migration will begin in any case. But what should we do with the Jews? Do you think they will be settled in Ostland, in villages? We were told in Berlin, 'Why all this bother? We can do nothing with them either in Ostland or in the Reichskommissariat. So liquidate them yourselves.' Gentlemen, I must ask you to rid yourself of all feelings of pity. We must annihilate the Jews wherever we find them and whenever it is possible.

When this was read to him at the Nuremberg trials he said:

One has to take the diary as a whole. You cannot go through 43 volumes and pick out single sentences and separate them from their context. I would like to say here that I do not want to argue or quibble about individual phrases. It was a wild and stormy period filled with terrible passions, and when a whole country is on fire and a life and death struggle is going on, such words may easily be used... Some of the words are terrible. I myself must admit that I was shocked at many of the words which I had used... A thousand years will pass and still this guilt of Germany will not have been erased.

Nazi death camps in occupied Poland (marked with black and white skulls)

An assassination attempt by the Polish Secret State on 29/30 January 1944 (the night preceding the 11th anniversary of Hitler's appointment as Chancellor of Germany) in Szarów near Kraków failed. A special train with Frank travelling to Lemberg/Lvov/Lviv was derailed after an explosive device discharged but no one was killed. Around 100 Polish hostages from Montelupich prison were executed as a punishment for the act.

== Death camps ==
Frank participated in the growth of the politics leading to genocide in Poland. Under his guidance, mass murder became a deliberate policy. The General Government was the location of four out of six extermination camps, namely: Bełżec, Treblinka, Majdanek and Sobibór; Chełmno and Birkenau fell just outside the borders of the General Government. Frank later claimed that the extermination of Jews was entirely controlled by Heinrich Himmler and the SS, and he – Frank – was unaware of the extermination camps in the General Government until early 1944, an assertion found to be untrue by the Nuremberg tribunal. During his testimony at Nuremberg, Frank claimed he submitted resignation requests to Hitler on 14 occasions, but Hitler would not allow him to resign. Frank fled the General Government in January 1945, as the Red Army advanced.

== Capture, trial and execution ==
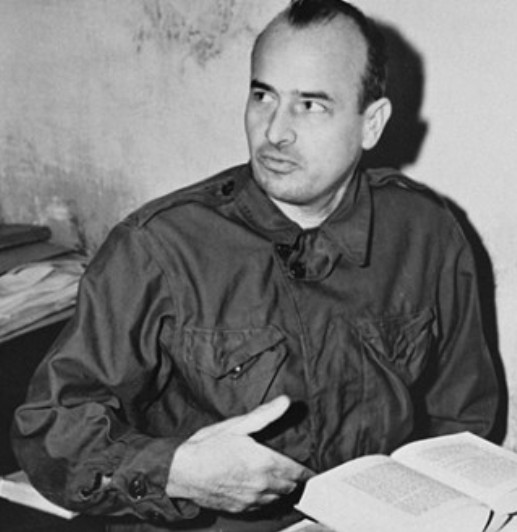
Frank in his cell, November 1945

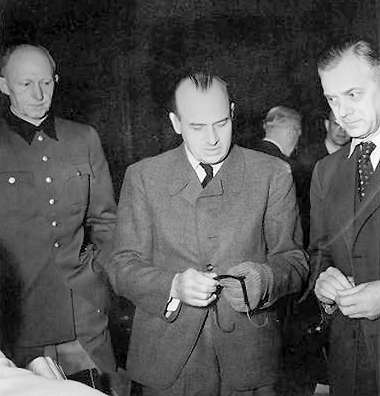
Frank (centre) at the Nuremberg trial, with Alfred Jodl (left) and Alfred Rosenberg (right) 1946. All three were executed by hanging on October 16.

Frank was captured by American troops on 4 May 1945, at Tegernsee in southern Bavaria. He attempted suicide twice. Chief Medical Officer Lt. Col. Rene Juchli reported that Frank was suffering from partial paralysis of his left hand as a result of one of his suicide attempts. He was indicted for war crimes and tried before the International Military Tribunal in Nuremberg from 20 November 1945 to 1 October 1946. During the trial he converted, guided by Fr Sixtus O'Connor, to Roman Catholicism, and claimed to have had a series of religious experiences.

Frank voluntarily surrendered 43 volumes of his personal diaries to the Allies, believing his struggles against other Nazi officials would be enough to secure his defence, and which were then used against him as evidence of his guilt. Frank confessed to some of the charges, and testified in response to questions from his defence attorney:

after having heard the testimony of the witness Rudolf Höss, my conscience does not allow me to throw the responsibility solely on these minor people. I myself have never installed an extermination camp for Jews, or promoted the existence of such camps; but if Adolf Hitler personally has laid that dreadful responsibility on his people, then it is mine too, for we have fought against Jewry for years; and we have indulged in the most horrible utterances.

During his captivity, he penned a series of letters in which he also left his last thoughts. To his son Norman, he wrote that he preferred to die and join the "brave soldiers, who were (...) killed in this war" than "be dealt in revenge from [migrants], traitors", from those such as Willy Brandt.

During their trials, he and Albert Speer were the only defendants to show any degree of remorse for their crimes, though, according to his son Niklas, he portrayed himself as a "man of the law", and was not personally acknowledging guilt, rather shifting it to the "German people" as a whole. At the same time, he accused the Allies, especially the Soviets, of their own wartime atrocities. Frank was found guilty of war crimes and crimes against humanity on 1 October 1946 and was sentenced to death by hanging. He was executed at Nuremberg Prison on 16 October by US Army Master Sergeant John C. Woods. Journalist Joseph Kingsbury-Smith wrote of the execution:

Hans Frank was next in the parade of death. He was the only one of the condemned to enter the chamber with a smile on his countenance. And, although nervous and swallowing frequently, this man, who was converted to Roman Catholicism after his arrest, gave the appearance of being relieved at the prospect of atoning for his evil deeds.

He answered to his name quietly and when asked for any last statement, he replied "I am thankful for the kind treatment during my captivity and I ask God to accept me with mercy."

Frank's body, alongside those of the other nine executed prisoners and the corpse of Hermann Göring, was cremated at Ostfriedhof (Munich) and their ashes were scattered in the river Isar.

== Memoirs ==
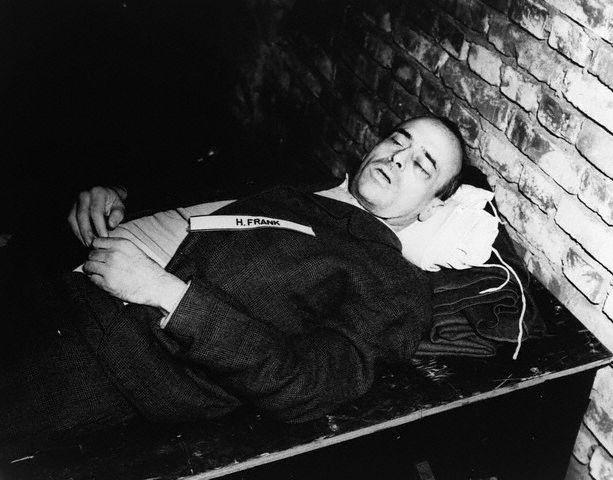
Frank's corpse after his execution by hanging

While awaiting execution, he wrote his memoirs, Im Angesicht des Galgens (In the Face of the Gallows), later published by his widow. In the capacity as his attorney, Frank was privy to personal details of Hitler's life. In his memoirs, Frank made the sensational claim that Hitler had commissioned him to investigate Hitler's family in 1930 after a "blackmail letter" had been received from Hitler's nephew, William Patrick Hitler, who allegedly threatened to reveal embarrassing facts about his uncle's ancestry. Frank said that the investigation uncovered evidence that Maria Schicklgruber, Hitler's paternal grandmother, had been working as a cook in the household of a Jewish man named Leopold Frankenberger before she gave birth to Hitler's father, Alois, out of wedlock. Frank claimed that he had obtained from a relative of Hitler's by marriage a collection of letters between Maria Schicklgruber and a member of the Frankenberger family that discussed a stipend for her after she left the family's employ. According to Frank, Hitler told him that the letters did not prove that the Frankenberger son was his father but rather his grandmother had merely extorted money from Frankenberger by threatening to claim his paternity of her illegitimate child.

Frank accepted this explanation, but added that it was still just possible that Hitler had some Jewish ancestry. But he thought it unlikely because, "from his entire demeanor, the fact that Adolf Hitler had no Jewish blood coursing through his veins seems so clearly evident that nothing more need be said on this."

Given that all Jews had been expelled from the province of Styria (which includes Graz) in the 15th century and were not allowed to return until the 1860s, scholars such as Ian Kershaw and Brigitte Hamann dismiss as baseless the "Frankenberger hypothesis", which before had only Frank's speculation to support it. More recent scholarship by Leonard Sax points out that many Jews lived in places without official sanction and demonstrated the existence of a settled Jewish community in Graz before the law formally permitted their residence. Nevertheless, there is no evidence outside of Frank's statements for the existence of a "Leopold Frankenberger" living in Graz in the 1830s, and Frank's story is inaccurate on several points such as the claim that Maria Schicklgruber came from "Leonding near Linz", when in fact she came from the hamlet of Strones near the village of Döllersheim. Some suggest that Frank (who turned against Nazism in his defence after 1945 but remained an anti-Semite) made the claim that Hitler had Jewish ancestry as a way of proving that Hitler was really a "Jew" and not an "Aryan", and in this way "proved" that the Third Reich's crimes were the work of the "Jewish" Hitler. The full anti-Semitic implications of Frank's story were borne out in a letter entitled "Was Hitler a Jew?", written to the editor of a Saudi newspaper in 1982 by a German man living in Saudi Arabia. The writer accepted Frank's story as the truth, and added since Hitler was a Jew, "the Jews should pay Germans reparations for the War, because one of theirs caused the destruction of Germany".

But Jewish-American author Ron Rosenbaum suggested another reason for Frank's story:

On the other hand, a different version of Frank emerges in the brilliantly vicious, utterly unforgiving portrait of him by his son, Niklas Frank, who (in a memoir called In the Shadow of the Reich) depicts his father as a craven coward and weakling, but one not without a kind of animal cunning, an instinct for lying, insinuation, self-aggrandizement. For this Hans Frank, disgraced and facing death on the gallows for following Hitler, fabricating such a story might be a cunning way of ensuring his place in history as the one man who gave the world the hidden key to the mystery of Hitler's psyche. While at the same time, revenging himself on his former master for having led him to this end by foisting a sordid and humiliating explanation of Hitler on him for all posterity. In any case, it was one Frank knew the victors would find seductive.

== Family ==
On 2 April 1925, Frank married 29-year-old secretary Brigitte Herbst (29 December 1895 – 9 March 1959) from Forst (Lausitz). The wedding took place in Munich and the couple honeymooned in Venetia. Hans and Brigitte Frank had five children:

- Sigrid Frank (born 17 March 1927 and died in South Africa)
- Norman Frank (3 June 1928 – March 2009)
- Brigitte Frank (13 January 1935 – 1981)
- Michael Frank (15 February 1937 – 1990)
- Niklas Frank (born 9 March 1939)

Brigitte Herbst had a reputation for having a more dominant personality than her husband: after 1939, she called herself "a queen of Poland" ("Königin von Polen"), which began as a jest from her husband at the time of his nomination. The marriage was unhappy and became colder from year to year, with Brigitte having many affairs, which weren't unknown amongst her children, including resulting rumours on there being different fathers. Frank sought a divorce in 1942, after meeting and falling in love with a former childhood acquaintance who was looking for her son, a soldier who had gone missing on the Eastern Front. Brigitte made great efforts to save their marriage in order to remain the "First Lady in the General Government". One of her most famous comments was "I'd rather be widowed than divorced from a Reichsminister!" Frank answered: "So you are my deadly enemy!" Besides making her children intercede for her with their father, she would go on to contact Himmler and Mrs. Goebbels, who would get Hitler to personally forbid Frank from divorcing his wife.

Contrary to Hans's later stance on the concentration camps and ghettos, the children were not isolated from them, despite their parents not discussing them directly with them. The youngest, Niklas, was often taken to a concentration camp by Hilde, their nanny. On one occasion, for Niklas and his brother Norman's enjoyment, the guards made undernourished prisoners sit on a donkey, which would then be made to jump and throw the compulsed riders to the ground. Niklas would also be told that a sad prisoner was a "witch", but one whom he did not have to worry about, since she would "die very soon". At another point, a Polish servant soiled bed sheets with soot, and his mother screamed that he would be sent to the camps. Niklas, who had befriended the Pole, heard this and began to cry, which made his mother stop scolding the man and start comforting her son. In the end, she let the matter go, and after the war, the man and his wife would credit Niklas with saving their lives.

All but Niklas would grieve their father at the time of his execution, feeling he was "innocent". Niklas Frank had been shunned early on by his parental figure, because of his father's belief he was instead the son a former family friend, Karl Lasch, and so he instead bonded closer to Hilde, their nanny, and also felt closer to his mother than his father. According to Niklas, his siblings' "brains" had been "poisoned" by their father. Niklas, who in his early adult years became a journalist for the Time magazine in Germany, would also participate in the early printing of Schindler's List. In 1987, Niklas Frank wrote a book about his father, Der Vater: Eine Abrechnung ("The Father: A Settling of Accounts"), which was published in English in 1991 as In the Shadow of the Reich. The book, first of a trilogy about his family's experiences, was serialized in the magazine Stern, and caused controversy in Germany, and even in some sectors of Poland, because of the scathing way in which the younger Frank depicted his father: Niklas referred to him as "a slime-hole of a Hitler fanatic" and questioned his remorse before his execution. In his work, Niklas also created a compilation of Nazi-era films of the Frank family.

The scars of having Hans as a parent would seemingly carry on, not quite healed. Michael, the closest to Niklas in their youth, though an ardent defender of their father's innocence, would develop an addiction to milk to the point his wife would struggle to save some for their children, which would go on to cause severe obesity and, in consequence, organ failure. Michael died in 1990, at 53 years old.

Norman, whose last words from his father were that Norman should be silent (which would lead to tensions between him and Niklas, whose work was often about documenting insights into his family), would also become addicted to alcohol. Though he recognized and was critical of his father's political work and Nazi rhetoric of his recorded speeches, Norman followed his father's advice on silence and so was critical of Niklas's work, though he later privately confessed being proud of his brother.

Brigitte committed suicide in 1981, at 46 years old, and Niklas would claim the motivation was "because she didn't want to become older" than their father. Niklas would come to believe this despite the fact that his sister had cancer, but the doctors claimed she could have survived about five to seven years. According to Niklas, she had written in her 16-year-old diary that she didn't want to become older than their father, and made it so it happened. She took her own life by overdosing whilst sleeping with her 8-year-old son, Hans's grandson.

Despite as a young woman, in 1945, being worried that they wouldn't be forgiven for "what we have done to the Jews", worried then of deadly retaliations, Sigrid remained a committed Nazi who emigrated to South Africa during the apartheid regime and, having developed an addiction for tranquilizers, died there.

Niklas is the sole living child of Hans and Brigitte Frank. Despite severe differences, especially when it came to Hans Frank's memory, Hans's family would remain unestranged all throughout their lives, not letting their differences destroy the relationships, no matter how fiercely they disagreed on the facts of the father's crimes.

Whilst some, if not all, of Hans's grandchildren have been noticeably affected by the events of their grandfather's life, Niklas's daughter has claimed her father's critical work about her grandfather was a "wall" around her, growing up.

== Decorations and awards ==
- Nuremberg Party Day Badge, 1929
- Golden Party Badge, 1933
- Blood Order #532, 1934
- Grand Cross of the Order of Saints Maurice and Lazarus, 1936
- Danzig Cross 1st Class, 1940
- War Merit Cross 2nd Class and 1st Class without Swords, 1940
- Nazi Party Long Service Award in Gold, Silver and Bronze

== See also ==
- Command responsibility
- German war crimes
- Origin theories of Adolf Hitler
- Glossary of Nazi Germany
- List of Nazi Party leaders and officials
- Nazi crimes against the Polish nation
- Nuremberg trials
- Nuremberg Trials bibliography
- The Holocaust in Poland
- Holocaust (miniseries) – TV production in which Frank is portrayed
