= Kai Uwe Höss =

German pastor and public speaker

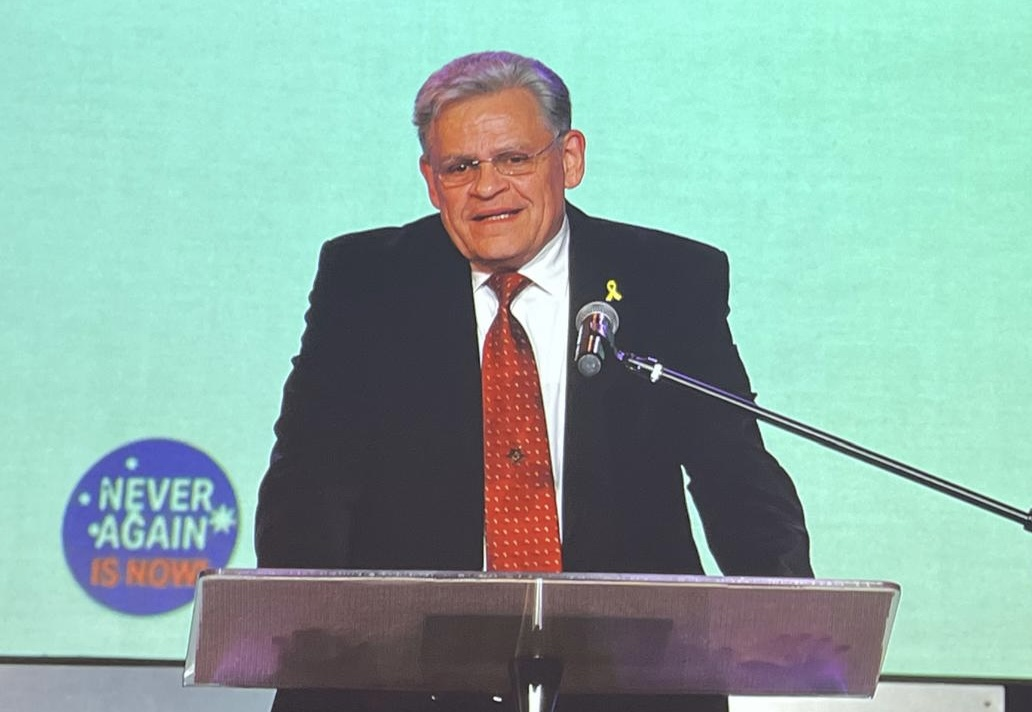
- Kai Uwe Höss speaking at public event in Perth, 2025
- Born: 1962 (age 63–64); Germany
- Occupations: Pastor, public speaker
- Known for: Public speaking on Holocaust legacy
- Relatives: Rudolf Höß (grandfather)

Kai Uwe Höss (also spelled Hoess and Höß; born 1962) is a German pastor and public speaker. He is known for lectures and interviews addressing the legacy of the Holocaust from a family perspective as the grandson of Rudolf Höß, the commandant of the Auschwitz concentration camp. In his public work, Höss focuses on historical responsibility, faith, and confronting the consequences of extremist ideology.

== Early life and background ==
Kai Uwe Höss was born in 1962 in West Germany and grew up in the Stuttgart region. He is the son of Hans-Jürgen Höss and the grandson of Rudolf Höß, a high-ranking SS officer who served as commandant of Auschwitz during World War II.

Höss has stated that his grandfather’s role in the Holocaust was rarely discussed within his family during his childhood and that he became more fully aware of it during his school years.

He pursued theological studies and became a pastor, eventually focusing much of his work on Holocaust education, reconciliation, and public speaking about the lessons of history and the dangers of extremism.

He later adopted the spelling “Hoess” for his surname in some contexts due to the limited use of the German letter “ö” outside German-speaking countries.

Höss has spoken publicly about the emotional impact of being related to the Auschwitz commandant and the responsibility he feels to confront that legacy. In interviews and talks he has addressed his grandfather’s crimes and the importance of remembrance, education, and resistance to antisemitism and other forms of hatred.

== Career ==
Before entering Christian ministry, Höss trained as a chef and later studied hotel and tourism management. He worked internationally in the hospitality industry in several countries in Europe, Asia, and the Middle East.

Following a near-fatal medical operation and a period of personal reflection, Höss experienced a transformative conversion to Christianity and later became active in Christian ministry. He was a founding member of Bible Church of Stuttgart in 2003 and became its pastor in 2016, where he has since worked in pastoral care and religious teaching.

== Public speaking ==
Höss gives lectures in schools, churches, and public institutions. His talks frequently address the Holocaust, antisemitism, moral responsibility, and the long-term impact of extremist ideologies.

In interviews, Höss has publicly rejected National Socialism and antisemitism and has described his work as an effort to promote awareness, responsibility, and reconciliation.

He has also appeared on television and in documentary formats discussing his family history and its implications for historical education.

== Media and documentary appearances ==
Höss was featured in the BBC World Service documentary podcast Heart and Soul: Kai Höss – My grandfather the Commandant of Auschwitz, which explores his perspective on his family’s history and his efforts to address his grandfather’s crimes.

He also appears in the 2024 documentary The Commandant's Shadow, directed by Daniela Völker and distributed by HBO Documentary Films and Warner Bros. Pictures.

== Personal life ==
Höss lives near Stuttgart with his family. He has stated that his family history has strongly influenced his public and religious work.

== See also ==
- Holocaust in Germany
- Auschwitz
- Rudolf Höß
- The Commandant's Shadow
