= August Dickmann =

Jehovah's Witness Holocaust victim

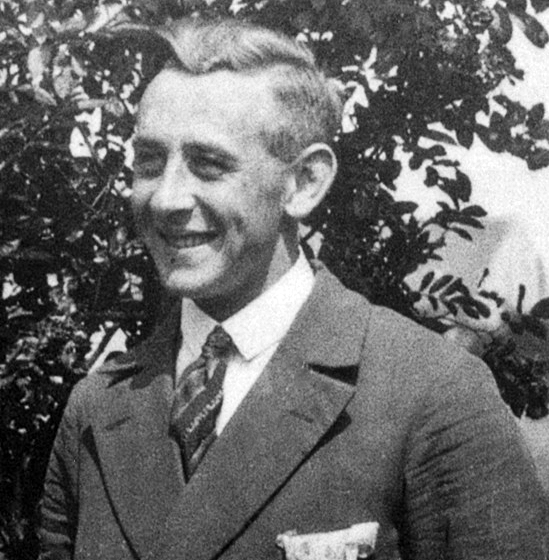
- August Dickmann in 1936
- Born: January 7, 1910; Dinslaken, German Empire
- Died: September 15, 1939 (aged 29); Sachsenhausen concentration camp, Oranienburg, Nazi Germany
- Cause of death: Execution by firing squad

August Dickmann (January 7, 1910 – September 15, 1939) was one of Jehovah's Witnesses and a Conscientious objector from Germany, and the first person to be killed for rejecting military service during World War II. He was one of many German Jehovah's Witnesses executed because of his religious beliefs during the Nazi regime. Commanding the firing squad that murdered Dickmann was SS officer Rudolf Höss, who was later to become the longest-serving commandant of Auschwitz concentration and extermination camp.

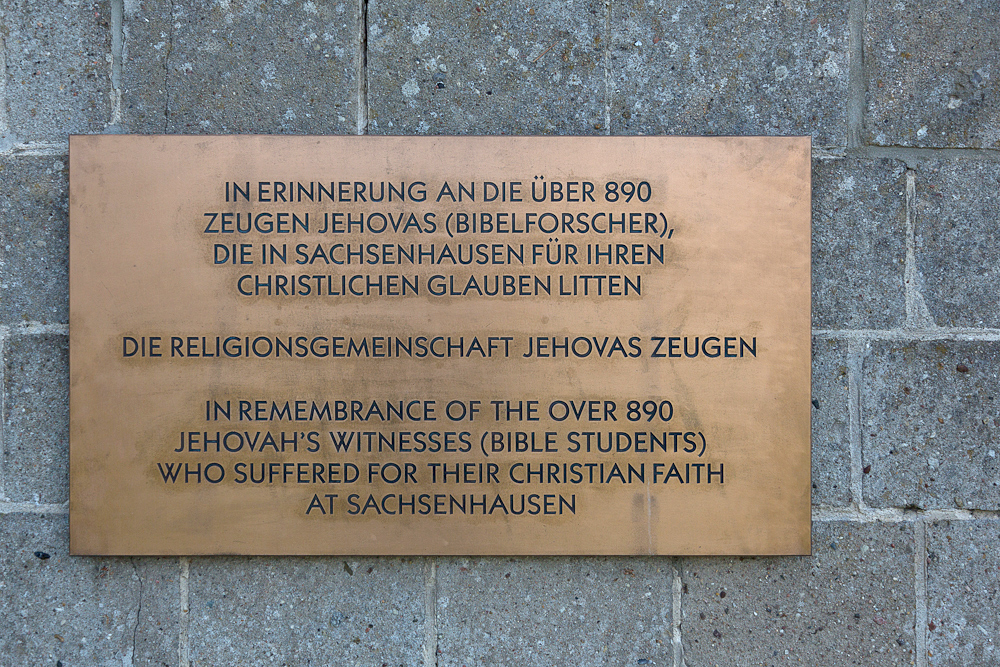
Memorial plaque dedicated to Jehovah’s Witnesses killed during the Holocaust in Sachsenhausen

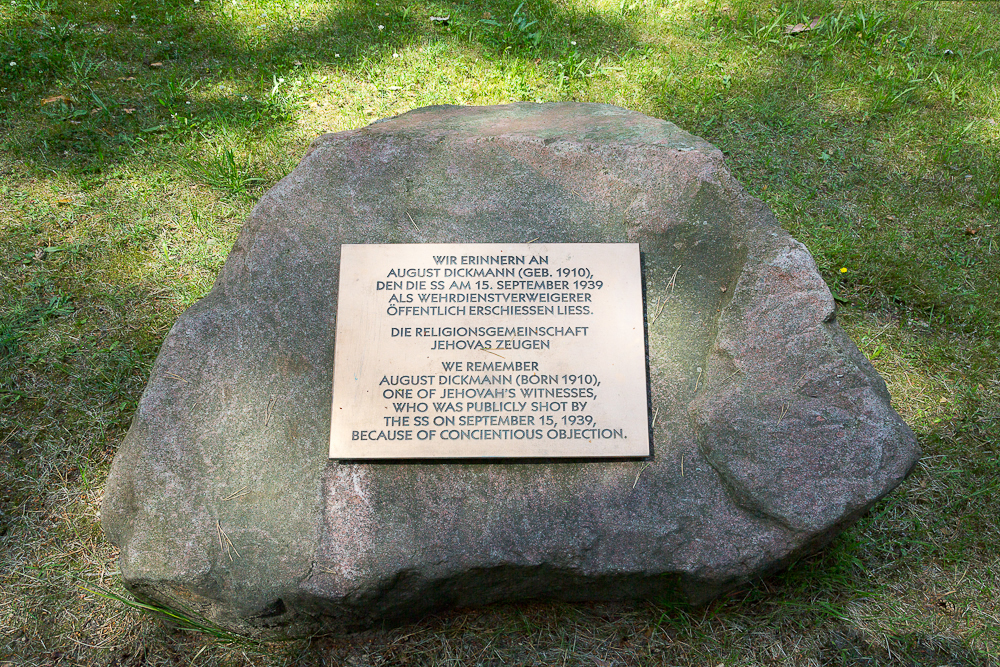
Memorial to August Dickmann in Sachsenhausen

== Life ==
After attending elementary school, August Dickmann worked in a sawmill. Around 1932, together with his brothers Heinrich and Fritz, he began a Bible study with Jehovah's Witnesses. All three remained active as missionaries, even when the activities of the religious community were banned after the seizure of power by the National Socialists in Germany in 1933. After his brother Fritz was sent to Esterwegen concentration camp in 1935, August Dickmann was arrested by the Gestapo in October 1936 and sentenced to prison. At the end of his sentence in October 1937, he was sent to Sachsenhausen concentration camp. His brother Heinrich was also imprisoned there from March 1939.

=== Conscientious objection ===
Years later, the political prisoner Willi Michalski quoted in a newspaper report from a speech by the camp commander Hermann Baranowski about what happened in the camp four days after the beginning of the Second World War on September 1, 1939, after Dickmann's wife had forwarded her husband's draft card, which had first been sent to his home address, to the camp: "On the fifth of September of this year, the prisoner Bible scholar August Dickmann was ordered to the political department of the camp to sign his draft card. In misjudgment of the political situation of the Reich and the existing state of war, Dickmann did not complete the signing despite the most emphatic instructions. He also stated on record that he could never become a soldier and would never kill people in war, since Jehovah had not sanctified and commanded war. He also declared that he did not recognize Adolf Hitler as the leader of the German people, because Adolf Hitler was wickedness personified and a tool of Satan. When made aware of the consequences of this behavior, Dickmann declared that he was prepared to bear the consequences ...". At first Dickmann was beaten for his refusal, then he was placed under arrest in a solitary cell in the camp bunker.

The camp commander Baranowski, enraged by Dickmann's inflexible attitude, reported the case to Berlin and requested permission from Heinrich Himmler, the Reichsführer SS, to have Dickmann shot in front of his brother Heinrich in the presence of all the other camp inmates – including around 380 Jehovah's Witnesses at the time. Baranowski hoped that this would dissuade a considerable number of Dickmann's fellow believers from their beliefs.

Himmler reacted immediately and ordered Dickmann's execution, the first public execution in Sachsenhausen.

=== Execution by firing squad ===
On September 15, 1939, after the evening roll call in the camp, all of the approximately 8500 prisoners had to remain standing. Afterwards, all Bible students were ordered to line up at the very front with the purple corner, where a wooden wall had been erected to serve as a bullet trap. August Dickmann was paraded by some SS officers. The camp commander Baranowski reported over the camp's loudspeakers. According to Wilhelm Röger, an eyewitness to the execution, he said the following: "The Bible scholar August Dickmann refused to sign the draft card. The reason: he no longer felt himself to be a German, but a citizen of the New Kingdom. The Reichsführer of the SS Himmler therefore sentenced him to death, which sentence is now being carried out. The sentence was handed down to him an hour ago." However, Arnold Eickmann describes in his memoirs that a list of Jehovah's Witnesses who had enlisted went through the ranks to sign up for compulsory military service. Dickmann and his brother wrote on the list: "Whoever kills by the sword will perish by the sword. Whose blood you will shed, whose blood will one day come upon you."

The firing squad was under the command of Rudolf Höß, the later camp commandant of the Auschwitz-Birkenau concentration camp, who at the time acted as adjutant to camp commandant Baranowski and as camp commander. From his pistol, Dickmann, whose body had slumped after the execution, received a "catch shot" in the left temple of his head.

=== Reaction of other imprisoned Jehovah's Witnesses ===
Dickmann's body had just been taken away when, according to witness testimony, camp commander Baranowski threatened those still gathered on the roll call square with the same fate if they did not sign the declaration of commitment, i.e. the official renunciation of Jehovah's Witnesses. Those who did not want to be shot should step forward.

After a long pause, two men actually stepped forward – but to explain that they were withdrawing their signatures under the impression of what they had just witnessed. Baranowski then left the square in a huff.
