= Malte Ludin =

German filmmaker

Malte Ludin is a German filmmaker. He was born in Bratislava, Slovakia in 1942.

He studied political science at the Free University of Berlin.

Malte was the youngest son of Hanns and Erla Ludin. His father served as ambassador to Slovakia during the Third Reich. As ambassador, Hanns Ludin signed orders that sent thousands of Jews to Auschwitz.

Malte directed a documentary film about his father, 2 or 3 Things I Know About Him, that opened at Film Forum in Manhattan on January 24, 2007.
