= Rudolf Höss =

Nazi commandant of Auschwitz (1901–1947)

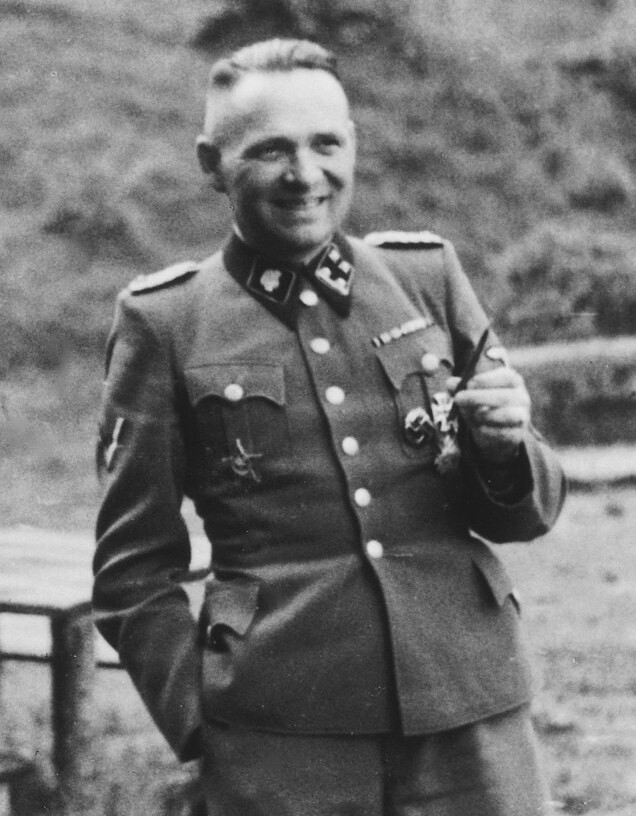
- Höss in 1944
- Born: Rudolf Franz Ferdinand Höß; 25 November 1901; Baden-Baden, Germany
- Died: 16 April 1947 (aged 45); Oświęcim, Poland
- Political party: Nazi Party
- Spouse: Hedwig Hensel (m. 1929)
- Children: 5
- Status: Released (1928); Executed (1947)
- Convictions: Murder (1924); Crimes against humanity (1947)
- Trial: Supreme National Tribunal
- Penalty: 10 years' imprisonment (1924); Death (1947)
- SS service
- Branch: SS-Totenkopfverbände; Waffen-SS
- Service years: 1934–1945
- Rank: SS-Obersturmbannführer
- Commands: Commandant of Auschwitz: Block Leader and Report Leader in Dachau (November 1934); Adjutant to the Commandant (August 1938) and Commander of the detention camp (December 1939) in Sachsenhausen; Commandant in Auschwitz (30 April 1940); Head of Office D I, Department D (Camps inspectorate) of SS-WVHA (1 December 1943); Chief Commandant (Standortältester) in Auschwitz ("Operation Höss" – Mass murder of Hungarian Jews) (8 May – 29 July 1944); Coordinator of killing operation by gassing in Ravensbrück (November 1944)

Rudolf Franz Ferdinand Höss (also Höß, Hoeß, or Hoess; German: [hœs]; 25 November 1901 – 16 April 1947) was a German SS officer, the commandant of the Auschwitz concentration camp, and a war criminal. After the defeat of Nazi Germany and the end of World War II, he lived under a false name until discovered in 1946 by the British military, who then turned him over to Polish authorities. Höss was convicted in Poland and executed for war crimes committed on the prisoners of the Auschwitz concentration camp and for his role in the Holocaust.

Höss was the longest-serving commandant of Auschwitz Concentration Camp (from 4 May 1940 to November 1943, and again from 8 May 1944 to 18 January 1945). He tested and implemented means to accelerate the systematic extermination of the Jewish population of Nazi-occupied Europe, known as the Final Solution. On the initiative of one of his subordinates, Karl Fritzsch, Höss introduced the pesticide Zyklon B to be used in gas chambers, where over a million people were killed.

Höss was hanged in 1947 following a trial before the Polish Supreme National Tribunal. During his imprisonment, at the request of the Polish authorities, Höss wrote his memoirs, released in English under the title Commandant of Auschwitz: The Autobiography of Rudolf Hoess.

== Early life ==
Höss was born in Baden-Baden into a strict Catholic family. He lived with his parents, Lina (née Speck) and Franz Xaver Höss. Höss was the eldest of three children and the only son. He was baptized Rudolf Franz Ferdinand on 11 December 1901. Höss was a lonely child with no companions of his own age until entering elementary school; all of his associations were with adults. Höss claimed in his autobiography that he was briefly abducted by Romanies in his youth. His father Franz was a former army officer who served in German East Africa and ran a tea and coffee business. He brought his son up on strict religious principles and with military discipline, having decided that he would enter the priesthood. Höss grew up with an almost fanatical belief in the central role of duty in a moral life. During his early years, there was a constant emphasis on sin, guilt, and the need to do penance.

== Youth and World War I ==
Höss began turning against religion in his early teens after an episode in which, he said, his priest broke the Seal of the Confessional by telling his father about an event at school wherein Höss had pushed another boy down the stairs, breaking the boy’s foot. Höss also felt betrayed by his father, because he had used the information against him. Höss had described this event during his confession. Soon afterward, Höss' father died, and Höss began moving toward a military life.

When World War I began, Höss briefly served in a military hospital and then, at age 14, he was admitted to his father's and his grandfather's old regiment, the 21st Regiment of Dragoons. When Höss was 15, he and the Ottoman Sixth Army fought at Baghdad, at Kut-el-Amara, as well as in Palestine. While stationed in the Ottoman Empire, Höss rose to the rank of Feldwebel (sergeant-in-chief), and at 17 was the youngest non-commissioned officer in the army. Wounded thrice and a victim of malaria, Höss was awarded the Iron Crescent, the Iron Cross first and second class, and other decorations. He also briefly commanded a cavalry unit. When the news of the armistice reached Damascus, where Höss was serving at that time, he and a few others decided not to wait for Allied forces to capture them as prisoners of war. Instead, they decided to attempt to travel all the way back to their homeland of Bavaria. This attempt forced them to traverse through the enemy territory of Romania, but they eventually reached Bavaria.

== Freikorps fighting and joining the Nazi Party ==
After the Armistice of 11 November 1918, Höss completed his secondary education and soon joined some of the emerging nationalist paramilitary groups including the Freikorps, first the East Prussian Volunteer Corps, and then Freikorps Roßbach, a unit associated with the Baltic area, Silesia and the Ruhr. Höss recalled this early mission into the Baltic in his autobiography:

"The fighting in the Baltic States was more savage and more bitter than any I had experienced [in the first] World War ... There was no real front, for the enemy was everywhere. When it came to a clash, it was a fight to the death, and no quarter was given or expected ... [Houses were] set on fire and burned the occupants to death. On innumerable occasions I came across this terrible spectacle of burned-out cottages containing the charred corpses of women and children ... Although later on I had to be the continual witness of far more terrible scenes, yet the picture of those half-burned-out huts at the edge of the forest beside the Dvina, with whole families dead within them, remains indelibly engraved on my mind."

Höss participated in the armed terror attacks on Polish people during the Silesian uprisings against the Germans, and on French nationals during the French Occupation of the Ruhr. The Roßbach Freikorps transformed into a feeder group for the early Nazi movement once its activities were unequivocally banned following their participation in the Third Silesian Uprising. The group's leader, Gerard Rossbach, became the first adjutant of the SA. After hearing a speech by Adolf Hitler in Munich, Höss joined the Nazi Party in 1922 (member number 3240) and renounced his affiliation with the Catholic Church.

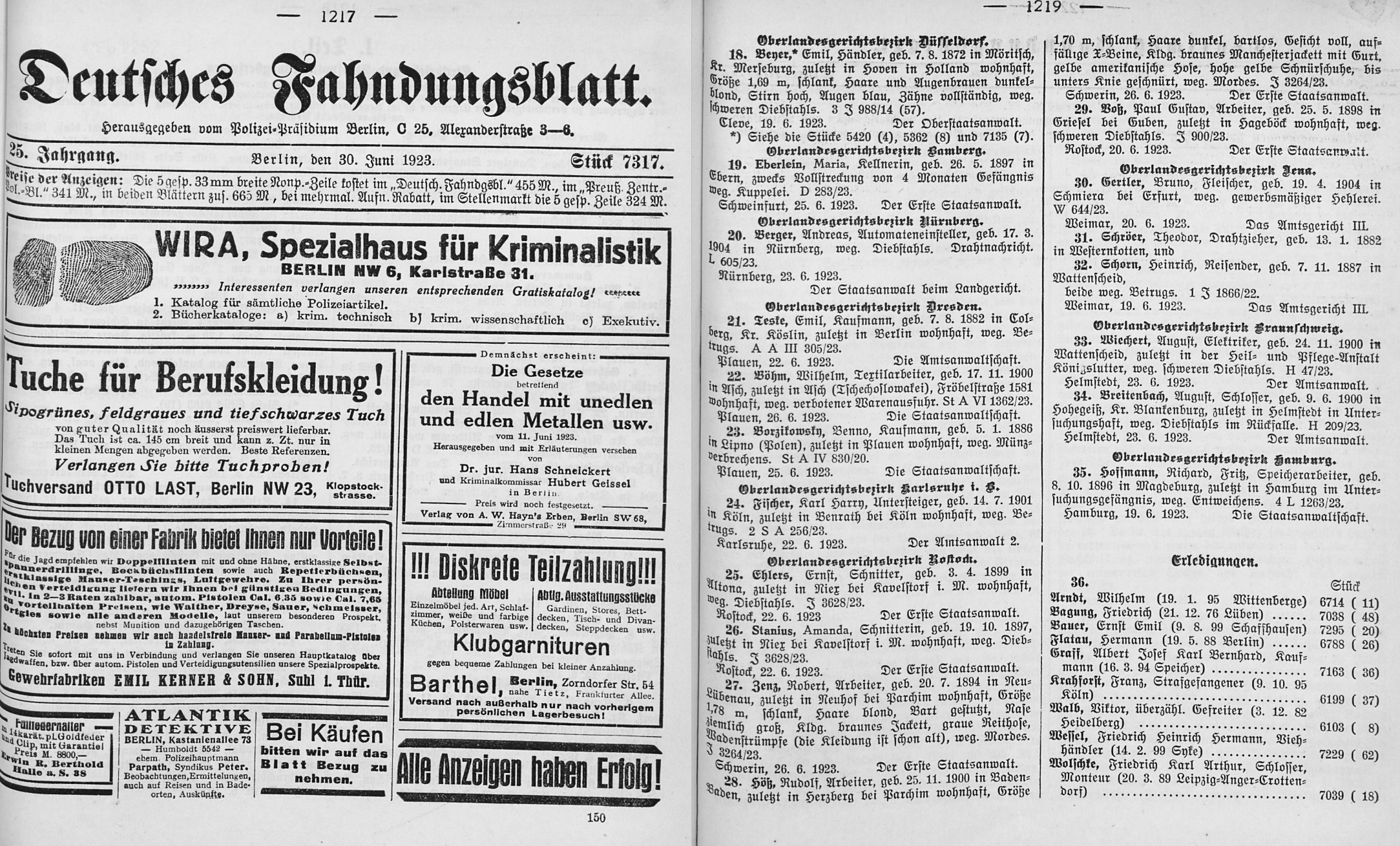
Issue of the Deutsches Fahndungsblatt ("German [Police Search Journal]") of 30 June 1923, including a "wanted"-notice for Rudolf Höss (at the bottom of the left-hand column of the page on the right-hand side) following the first murder he ever committed in May 1923.

On 31 May 1923, in Mecklenburg, Höss and members of the Freikorps attacked and beat to death local schoolteacher Walther Kadow on the wishes of farm supervisor Martin Bormann, who later became Hitler's private secretary. Kadow was believed to have tipped off the French occupational authorities that Freikorps paramilitary soldier Albert Leo Schlageter was carrying out sabotage operations against French supply lines. Schlageter was arrested and executed on 26 May 1923; soon afterwards Höss and several accomplices, including Bormann, took their revenge on Kadow. In 1923, after one of the killers confessed to a local newspaper, Höss was arrested and tried as the ringleader. Although he later claimed that another man was actually in charge, Höss accepted the blame as the group's leader. He was convicted and sentenced (on 15 or 17 March 1924) to 10 years in prison, while Bormann received a one-year sentence. Höss served out his prison sentence in the Brandenburg penitentiary. Due to his exemplary behavior while an inmate there, he gained privileges such as the light in his cell being kept on after 10 PM lights out, being allowed to write letters to relatives every two weeks, and a job in the prison's administration. These privileges were in part due to him being considered a "delinquent motivated by conviction" (offender whose motives had been on moral, political, or religious grounds) and partly because of prison officials who sympathized with Höss' cause and his political views.

Höss was released from prison in July 1928 as part of a general amnesty and joined the Artaman League, an anti-urbanization movement, or back-to-the-land movement, that promoted a farm-based lifestyle. On 17 August 1929, Höss married Hedwig Hensel (3 March 1908 – 15 September 1989), whom he met in the Artaman League. Between 1930 and 1943, they had five children: two sons (Klaus and Hans-Jürgen) and three daughters (Heidetraut, Inge-Brigitt, and Annegret). Klaus, Höss' eldest son, was born in 1930; Heidetraut, Höss' eldest daughter, was born in 1932; Inge-Brigitt was born on a farm in Pommern in 1933; Hans-Jürgen, Höss' younger son, was born in 1937; and Annegret, the youngest child, was born at Auschwitz in November 1943.

During this time, Höss worked and lived at a farm in Sallentin, whose owner wanted to establish a horse stable, and his experience with horses from being in the cavalry in World War I gave him the necessary experience to do so. Höss would later join the cavalry squadron of the Schutzstaffel on 30 September 1933, and become a SS-Anwärter. Also during this time, Höss was noticed by Heinrich Himmler during an inspection of the SS in Stettin. They also were previously acquainted (according to Höss) from their Artaman League days, although other sources claim they knew each other from Höss' involvement in the Nazi party in the 1920s.

== SS career ==
On 1 April 1934, Höss joined the SS, on Himmler's effective call-to-action, and moved to the SS-Totenkopfverbände (SS Death's Head Units) that same year. Höss was assigned to the Dachau concentration camp in December 1934, where he held the post of Block leader. His mentor at Dachau was the then SS-Brigadeführer Theodor Eicke, the reorganizer of the Nazi concentration camp system. In 1938, Höss was promoted to SS-captain and was made adjutant to Hermann Baranowski in the Sachsenhausen concentration camp. There, Höss led the firing squad that, on Himmler's orders on 15 September 1939, killed August Dickmann, a Jehovah's Witness who was the first conscientious objector to be executed after the start of the Second World War. Höss fired the finishing shot from his pistol. He joined the Waffen-SS in 1939 after the invasion of Poland. Höss excelled in that capacity and was recommended by his superiors for further responsibility and promotion. By the end of his tour of duty there, Höss was serving as administrator of prisoners' property. On 18 January 1940, as head of the protective custody camp at Sachsenhausen, Höss ordered all prisoners not assigned to work details to stand outside in frigid conditions reaching −26 °C (−15 °F). Most of the inmates had no coats or gloves. When block elders dragged some of the frozen inmates to the infirmary, Höss ordered the infirmary doors to be closed. During the day, 78 inmates died, and another 67 died that night.

=== Auschwitz command ===
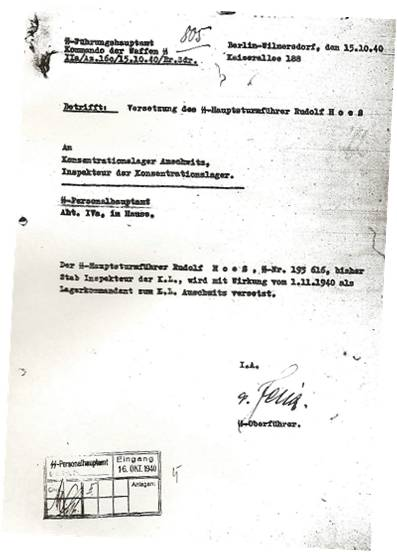
Appointment order of Rudolf Höss as Commander of Auschwitz Concentration Camp

Höss was dispatched to evaluate the feasibility of establishing a concentration camp in western Poland, a territory Germany had incorporated into the province of Upper Silesia. His favorable report led to the creation of the Auschwitz camps and his appointment as commandant. The camp was built around an old Austro-Hungarian (and later Polish) army barracks near the town of Oświęcim; its German name was Auschwitz. Höss commanded the camp for three and a half years, during which he expanded the original facility into a sprawling complex known as Auschwitz-Birkenau concentration camp. Höss had been ordered "to create a transition camp for ten thousand prisoners from the existing complex of well-preserved buildings," and he went to Auschwitz determined "to do things differently" and develop a more efficient camp than those at Dachau and Sachsenhausen, where he had previously served. Höss lived at Auschwitz in a villa with his wife and five children.

The earliest inmates at Auschwitz were Soviet prisoners-of-war and Polish prisoners including peasants and intellectuals. Some 700 arrived in June 1940 and were told that they would not survive more than three months. At its peak, Auschwitz comprised three separate facilities: Auschwitz I, Auschwitz II-Birkenau and Auschwitz III-Monowitz. These included many satellite sub-camps, and the entire camp complex was built on about 8,000 hectares (20,000 acres) that had been cleared of all inhabitants. Auschwitz I was the administrative centre for the complex; Auschwitz II Birkenau was the extermination camp where most of the murders were committed; and Auschwitz III Monowitz was the slave-labour camp for I.G. Farbenindustrie AG, and later other German industries. The main purpose of Monowitz was the production of a form of synthetic rubber called "buna" and synthetic oil.

Most infamous at Auschwitz I, the original camp, was Block 11 and the courtyard between Blocks 10 and 11. High stone walls and a massive wooden gate shielded Nazi brutality from observers. Condemned prisoners were led from Block 11, naked and bound, to the Death Wall at the back of the courtyard. A member of the Political Department then shot the prisoners in the back of the head, using a small-caliber pistol to minimize noise. As punishment, Höss also employed standing cells in Block 11. On many occasions, he condemned 10 random prisoners to death by starvation in a Block 11 cell in retaliation for the escape of one inmate.

=== Mass murder ===
In June 1941, according to Höss' trial testimony, he was summoned to Berlin for a meeting with Himmler "to receive personal orders". Himmler told Höss that Hitler had given the order for the "Final Solution". According to Höss, Himmler had selected Auschwitz for the extermination of Europe's Jews "on account of its easy access by rail and also because the extensive site offered space for measures ensuring isolation". Himmler described the project as a "secret Reich matter" and told Höss not to speak about it with SS-Gruppenführer Richard Glücks, head of the Nazi camp system run by the SS-Totenkopfverbände. Höss said that "no one was allowed to speak about these matters with any person and that everyone promised upon his life to keep the utmost secrecy." He told his wife about the camp's purpose only at the end of 1942, since she already knew about it from Fritz Bracht. Himmler told Höss that he would be receiving all operational orders from Adolf Eichmann, who arrived at the camp four weeks later.

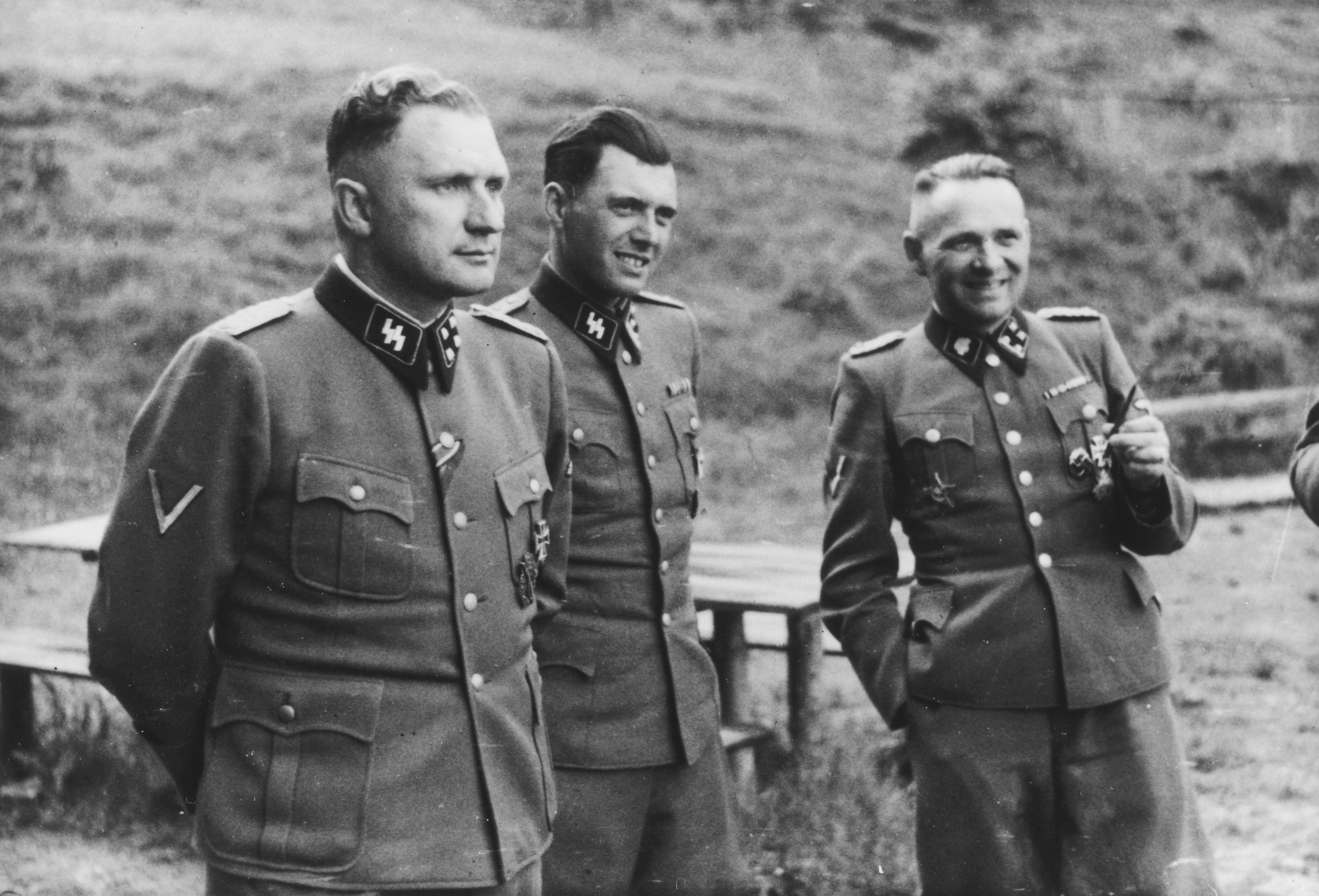
Höss (far right) with commander of Auschwitz I Richard Baer and Auschwitz chief medical officer Josef Mengele in 1944

Höss began testing and perfecting techniques of mass murder on 3 September 1941. His experiments led to Auschwitz becoming the most efficiently murderous instrument of the Final Solution and the Holocaust's most potent symbol. According to Höss, during standard camp operations, two or three trains carrying 2,000 prisoners each would arrive daily for four to six weeks. The prisoners were unloaded in the Birkenau camp and subjected to "selection", usually by a member of the SS medical staff. Men were separated from women, and only those deemed suitable for Nazi slave labor were allowed to live. The elderly, infirm, children, and mothers with children were sent directly to the gas chambers. Those found fit for labor were marched to barracks in either Birkenau or one of the Auschwitz camps, stripped naked, shorn of all hair, sprayed with disinfectant, and tattooed with a prisoner number. At first, small gassing bunkers were located deep in the woods to avoid detection. Later, four large gas chambers and crematoria were constructed in Birkenau to make the killing process more efficient, and to handle the sheer volume of victims.

Technically [it] wasn't so hard—it would not have been hard to exterminate even greater numbers ... The killing itself took the least time. You could dispose of 2,000 head in half an hour, but it was the burning that took all the time. The killing was easy; you didn't even need guards to drive them into the chambers; they just went in expecting to take showers and, instead of water, we turned on poison gas. The whole thing went very quickly.

Höss experimented with various gassing methods. According to Eichmann's trial testimony in 1961, Höss told him that he used cotton filters soaked in sulfuric acid for early killings. Höss later introduced hydrogen cyanide (prussic acid), produced from the pesticide Zyklon B, to the process of extermination, after his deputy Karl Fritzsch had tested it on a group of Russian prisoners in 1941. With Zyklon B, he said that it took three to 15 minutes for the victims to die and that "we knew when the people were dead because they stopped screaming." In an interview at Nuremberg after the war, Höss commented that after observing the prisoners die by Zyklon B, "... this gassing set my mind at rest for the mass extermination of the Jews was to start soon."

In 1942, Höss began a forced sexual relationship with an Austrian communist political prisoner at Auschwitz, Eleonore Hodys (or Nora Mattaliano-Hodys). She became pregnant and was imprisoned in a standing-only arrest cell. Released from the cell, Hodys had an abortion in a camp hospital in 1943 and, according to her later testimony, just barely evaded being selected to be killed. These events and corruption rumours may have led to Höss' temporary recall from the Auschwitz command in 1943. The level of corruption at Auschwitz had risen so high that, in the autumn of 1943, Lieutenant Konrad Morgen and his assistant Wiebeck were tasked with investigating both the embezzlements taking place in the camp and Höss' illegal relationship. Morgen interviewed Hodys and Höss and intended to proceed against Höss, but the case was dismissed. Morgen, Wiebeck and Hodys gave testimony after the war.

After being replaced as the Auschwitz commander by Arthur Liebehenschel, on 10 November 1943, Höss assumed Liebehenschel's former position as the head of Amt D I in Amtsgruppe D of the SS Main Economic and Administrative Office (WVHA); Höss also was appointed deputy of the inspector of the concentration camps under Richard Glücks.

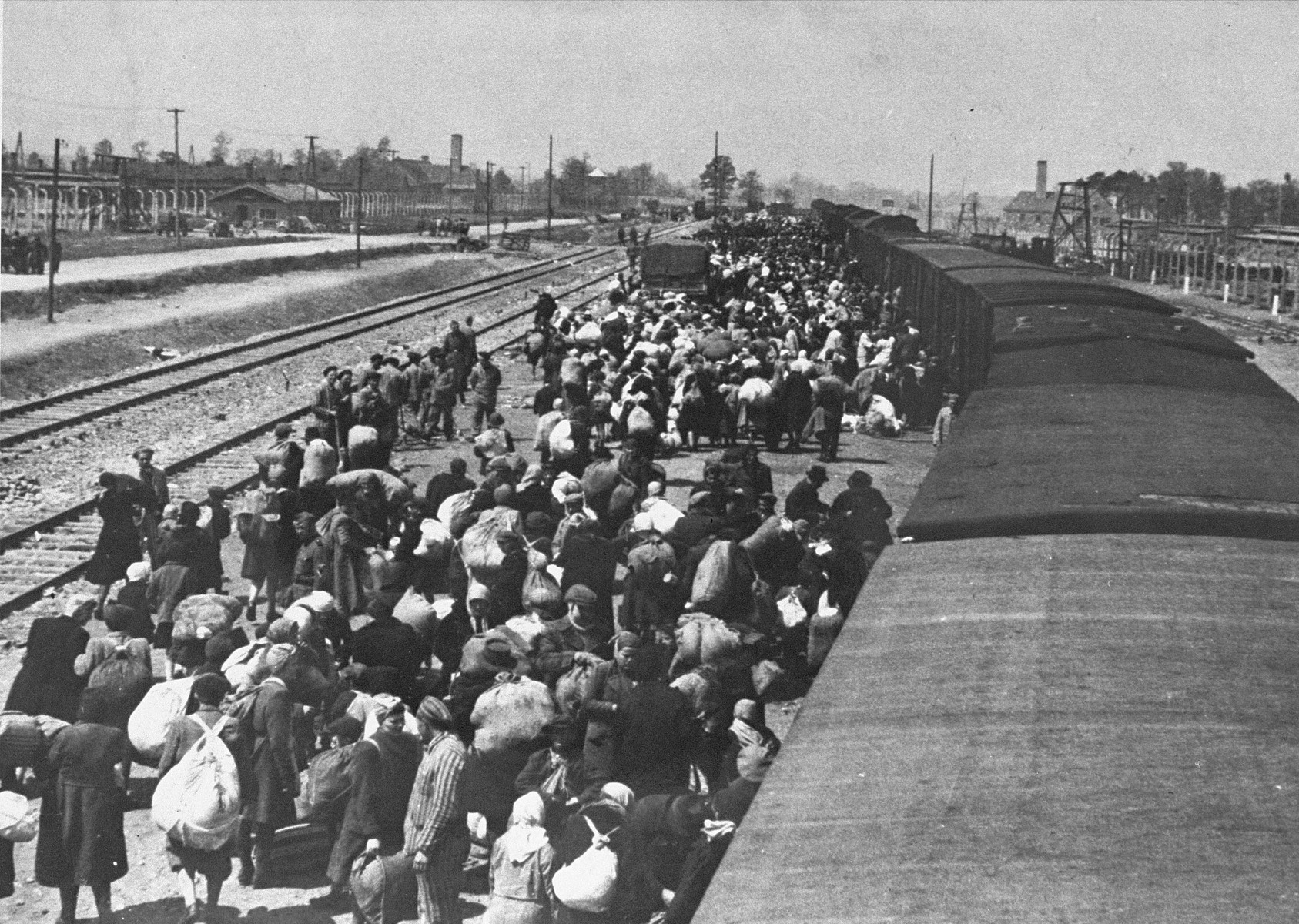
The ramp at Birkenau, 1944. Chimneys of Crematoria II and III are visible on the horizon.

=== Operation Höss ===
On 8 May 1944, Höss returned to Auschwitz to supervise Operation Höss, where 430,000 Hungarian Jews were transported to the camp and killed in 56 days. Even Höss' expanded facility could not handle the huge number of victims' corpses, and the camp staff were obliged to dispose of thousands of bodies by burning them in open pits. In May and June alone, almost 10,000 Jews were being gassed per day. Because the number of people exceeded the capacity of the gas chambers and crematoria, mass pit executions were established. Jews were forced to undress, then led to a hidden fire pit by Sonderkommando where they were shot by the SS, then thrown into the flames.

=== Ravensbrück ===
Höss' final posting was at Ravensbrück concentration camp. He moved there in November 1944 with his family who lived close by. After the completion of the gas chamber, Höss coordinated the operations of killing by gassing, with a death toll of over 2,000 female prisoners.

== Fall of the Third Reich ==
In April 1945, Höss and his family went to Darss, together with Richard Glücks, before continuing to Schleswig-Holstein. In the traveling party was the wife of Theodor Eicke, her daughter, and several other families belonging to prominent Nazis. Höss had been tasked with keeping them out of enemy hands. During their escape, they learned about the death of Hitler.

Höss and his wife were downcast at the news that the Führer was dead. Since Höss had procured poison for his family, in case they were captured by the Russians, they considered the idea of suicide together with their children, like the Goebbels family and other Germans previously had done:

Nevertheless, because of the children, we did not do this. For their sake we wanted to take on our own shoulders all that was coming. But we should have done it. I have always regretted it since. We would all have been spared a great deal, especially my wife and the children. How much more suffering will they have to endure? We were bound and fettered to that other world, and we should have disappeared with it.

Instead, Hedwig and the children were taken to the home of the children's old governess, who lived at Michaelisdonn, while Höss and his son Klaus continued on alone.

== Arrest, trial, and execution ==
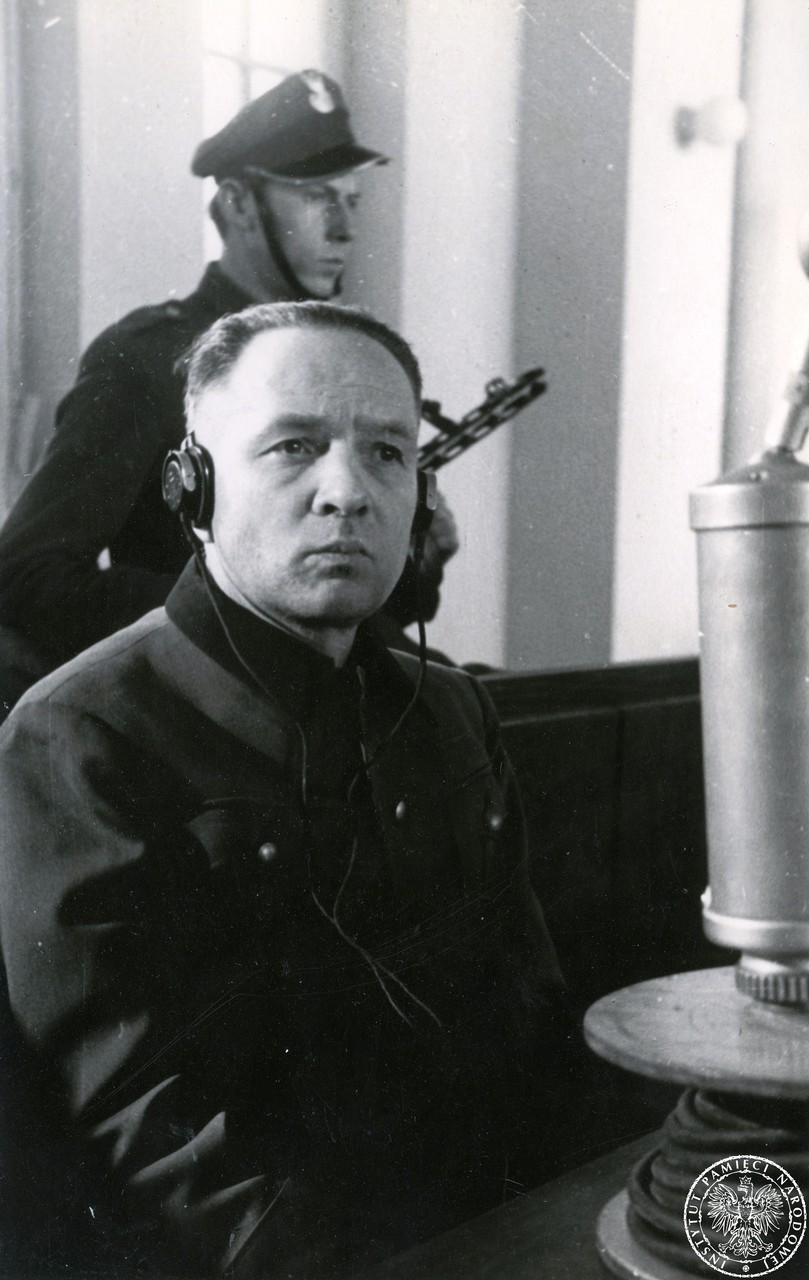
Höss on trial in Poland in 1947

In the final days of the war, Himmler advised Höss to disguise himself as a member of the Kriegsmarine. Adopting the pseudonym "Franz Lang" and working as a gardener, Höss lived in Gottrupel, Schleswig-Holstein, with his family and evaded arrest for nearly a year.

In 1946, Hanns Alexander, a German Jew who had fled to England in 1936, becoming a Nazi hunter working for the British government's "No. 1 War Crimes Investigation Team", managed to uncover Höss' location. Alexander, who was then a captain in the Royal Pioneer Corps, travelled to Höss' residence with a group of British soldiers, many of whom were Jewish. Alexander's men unsuccessfully interrogated Höss' daughter Brigitte; according to Brigitte, the soldiers subsequently started to beat her brother Klaus, leading Höss' wife to give up his location. According to Alexander, Höss attempted to bite into a cyanide pill once he was discovered by the soldiers. Höss initially denied his identity:

... insisting he was a lowly gardener, but Alexander saw his wedding ring and ordered Höss to take it off, threatening to cut off his finger if he did not. Höss's name was inscribed inside. The soldiers accompanying Alexander began to beat Höss with axe handles. After a few moments and a minor internal debate, Alexander pulled them off.

In his memoir, Höss also claimed to have suffered mistreatment at the hands of his British captors and to have signed the transcript of his first interrogation under duress.

On 15 April 1946, Höss testified at the International Military Tribunal at Nuremberg, where he gave a detailed accounting of his crimes. Höss was called as a defense witness by Ernst Kaltenbrunner's lawyer, Kurt Kauffmann. The transcript of Höss' testimony was later entered as evidence during the 4th Nuremberg Military Tribunal, known as the Pohl Trial for principal defendant Oswald Pohl. Affidavits that Höss made while imprisoned in Nuremberg were also used at the Pohl and IG Farben trials.

In his affidavit made at Nuremberg on 5 April 1946, Höss stated:

I commanded Auschwitz until 1 December 1943, and estimate that at least 2,500,000 victims were executed and exterminated there by gassing and burning, and at least another half million succumbed to starvation and disease, making a total of about 3,000,000 dead. This figure represents about 70% or 80% of all persons sent to Auschwitz as prisoners, the remainder having been selected and used for slave labor in the concentration camp industries. Included among the executed and burnt were approximately 20,000 Russian prisoners of war (previously screened out of Prisoner of War cages by the Gestapo) who were delivered to Auschwitz in Wehrmacht transports operated by regular Wehrmacht officers and men. The remainder of the total number of victims included about 100,000 German Jews, and great numbers of citizens (mostly Jewish) from The Netherlands, France, Belgium, Poland, Hungary, Czechoslovakia, Greece, or other countries. We executed about 400,000 Hungarian Jews alone at Auschwitz in the summer of 1944.

On 25 May 1946, Höss was handed over to Polish authorities, and the Supreme National Tribunal in Poland tried him for murder. In his essay on the Final Solution in Auschwitz, which Höss wrote in Kraków, he revised the previously given death toll:

I myself never knew the total number, and I have nothing to help me arrive at an estimate.

I can only remember the figures involved in the larger actions, which were repeated to me by Eichmann or his deputies.

- From Upper Silesia and the General Gouvernement 250,000
- Germany and Theresienstadt 100,000
- Holland 95,000
- Belgium 20,000
- France 110,000
- Greece 65,000
- Hungary 400,000
- Slovakia 90,000 [Total 1,130,000]

I can no longer remember the figures for the smaller actions, but they were insignificant by comparison with the numbers given above. I regard a total of 2.5 million as far too high. Even Auschwitz had limits to its destructive capabilities.

Höss' trial lasted from 11 to 29 March 1947 and he was sentenced to death by hanging on 2 April. The sentence was carried out two weeks later on 16 April beside the crematorium of the former Auschwitz I concentration camp. Höss was hanged on a short-drop gallows constructed specifically for that purpose, at the location of the camp's Gestapo. The message on the board that marks the site reads:

This is where the camp Gestapo was located. Prisoners suspected of involvement in the camp's underground resistance movement or of preparing to escape were interrogated here. Many prisoners died as a result of being beaten or tortured. The first commandant of Auschwitz, SS-Obersturmbannführer Rudolf Höss, who was tried and sentenced to death after the war by the Polish Supreme National Tribunal, was hanged here on 16 April 1947.

Höss wrote his autobiography while awaiting execution; it was first published in a Polish translation in 1951 and then in the original German in 1956, edited by Martin Broszat. It later appeared in various English editions and consists of two parts, one about his own life and the second about other SS men with whom he had become acquainted, mainly Heinrich Himmler and Theodor Eicke, among several others. Höss blamed his subordinates and kapos, prisoner functionaries, for the mistreatment of prisoners. Höss claimed that he was unable to stop the abuse despite his best efforts. Höss also stated that he was never cruel and never mistreated any inmate. Höss blamed Hitler and Himmler for using their powers "wrongly and even criminally". He saw himself as "a cog in the wheel of the great extermination machine created by the Third Reich".

After discussions with Höss during the Nuremberg trials at which he testified, the American military psychologist Gustave Gilbert wrote the following:

In all of the discussions, Höss is quite matter-of-fact and apathetic, shows some belated interest in the enormity of his crime, but gives the impression that it never would have occurred to him if somebody hadn't asked him. There is too much apathy to leave any suggestion of remorse and even the prospect of hanging does not unduly stress him. One gets the general impression of a man who is intellectually normal, but with the schizoid apathy, insensitivity and lack of empathy that could hardly be more extreme in a frank psychotic.

Four days before being executed, Höss' acknowledgement of the enormity of his crimes was revealed in a message to the state prosecutor:

My conscience compels me to make the following declaration. In the solitude of my prison cell, I have come to the bitter recognition that I have sinned gravely against humanity. As Commandant of Auschwitz, I was responsible for carrying out part of the cruel plans of the "Third Reich" for human destruction. In so doing I have inflicted terrible wounds on humanity. I caused unspeakable suffering for the Polish people in particular. I am to pay for this with my life. May the Lord God forgive one day what I have done. I ask the Polish people for forgiveness. In Polish prisons I experienced for the first time what human kindness is. Despite all that has happened I have experienced humane treatment which I could never have expected, and which has deeply shamed me. May the facts which are now coming out about the horrible crimes against humanity make the repetition of such cruel acts impossible for all time.

Shortly before his execution, Höss returned to the Catholic Church. On 10 April 1947, he received the sacrament of penance from Fr. Władysław Lohn, S.J., provincial of the Polish Province of the Society of Jesus. The next day, the same priest administered to him Holy Communion as Viaticum.

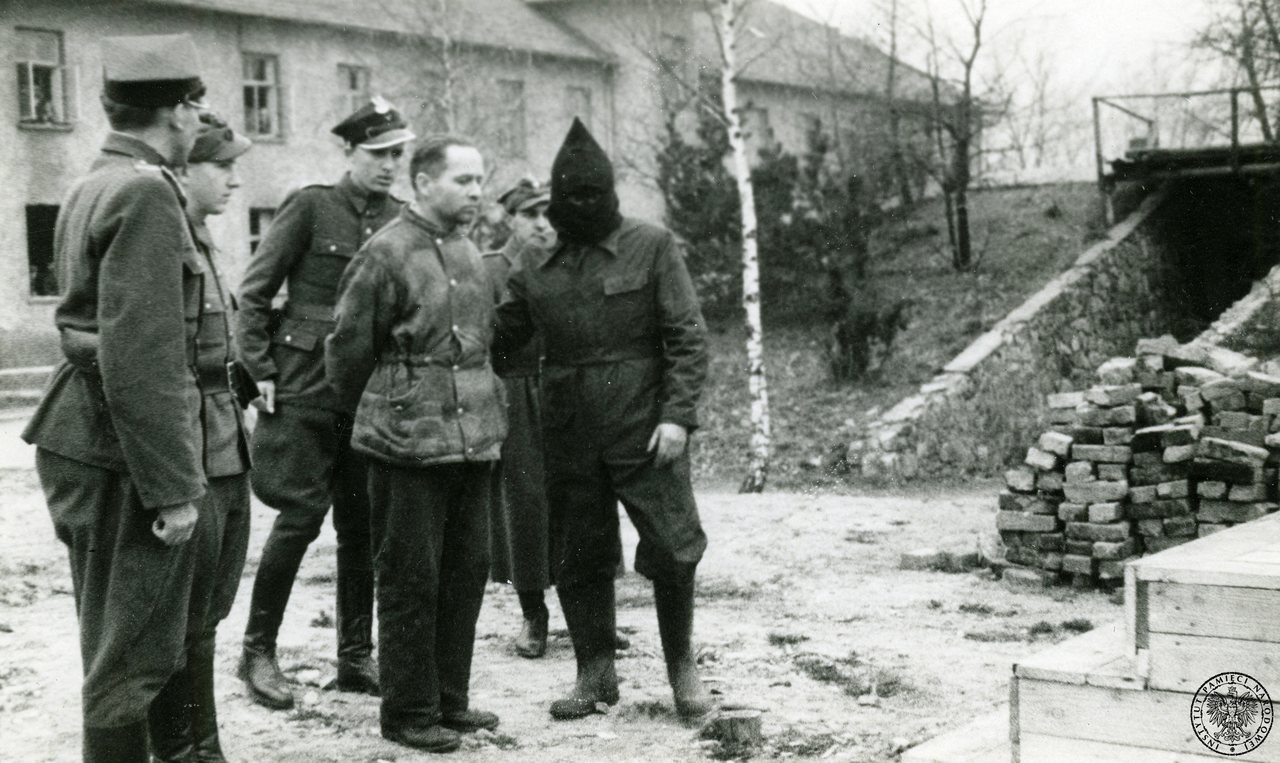
Höss being escorted to the gallows

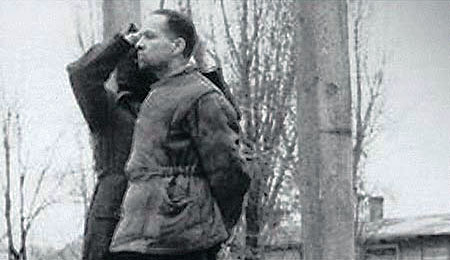
Höss on the gallows, immediately before his execution

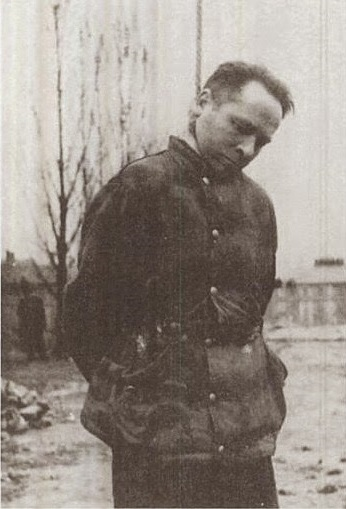
Höss immediately after his execution

On the morning of 16 April 1947, Höss was hanged. At the request of former camp prisoners, the execution was carried out in Auschwitz, the camp he once commanded. Approximately 100 witnesses were present, including former prisoners and various high-ranking officials of the Polish government. This was the last public execution in Poland. His body was cremated, and his ashes were scattered in the forest.

== Family ==
Höss married Hedwig Hensel on 17 August 1929. They had five children:

  1. Klaus Höss: born 6 February 1930, died in Australia in the 1980s.
  2. Heidetraud Höss: born 9 April 1932, died prior to 2020.
  3. Inge-Brigitt Höss: born 18 August 1933, died October 2023.
  4. Hans-Jürgen Höss: born in May 1937.
  5. Annegret Höss: born 7 November 1943.

In a farewell letter to his wife, Höss wrote on 11 April 1947:

Based on my present knowledge I can see today clearly, severely and bitterly for me, that the entire ideology about the world in which I believed so firmly and unswervingly was based on completely wrong premises and had to absolutely collapse one day. And so my actions in the service of this ideology were completely wrong, even though I faithfully believed the idea was correct. Now it was very logical that strong doubts grew within me, and whether my turning away from my belief in God was based on completely wrong premises. It was a hard struggle. But I have again found my faith in my God.

The same day in a farewell letter to his children, Höss told his eldest son:

Keep your good heart. Become a person who lets himself be guided primarily by warmth and humanity. Learn to think and judge for yourself, responsibly. Don't accept everything without criticism and as absolutely true ... The biggest mistake of my life was that I believed everything faithfully which came from the top, and I didn't dare to have the least bit of doubt about the truth of that which was presented to me. ... In all your undertakings, don't just let your mind speak, but listen above all to the voice in your heart.

An inmate who worked as a gardener recalled that Klaus, the eldest son, used to play "... with a pistol, with a carbine and shot straight into the garden. A few times this put us in danger. The child did so out of stupidity, aimed at people and said: 'I'll shoot the Polish pig.'"

According to Janina Szczurek, a Polish woman who worked as a seamstress for the family, the Höss children used to run in the garden and watch the prisoners work. The Höss children once wanted to play, and she sewed the oldest son a kapo armband and the other children's badges "triangles in different colors" such as worn by the prisoners. As they were running around in the garden, Höss came home, saw what his children were wearing and tore off the badges and ordered the children in the house. Szczurek was not punished but given a warning.

Hans-Jürgen's younger son, Rainer, presented himself as a researcher determined to expose his grandfather's crimes. However, Rainer has been accused of trading on his name and defrauding the families of Holocaust victims for financial gain. Rainer has been criminally convicted 13 times, most recently for fraud in August 2020. Hans-Jürgen's eldest son, Kai Uwe, an evangelical pastor, has publicly addressed the legacy of the Holocaust and spoken about the importance of opposing hatred and antisemitism. In relation to his younger brother's actions, he stated, "I just want him [Rainer] to stop defrauding people using the names and ashes of millions of Holocaust victims."

Inge-Brigitt, also simply known as "Brigitte", another daughter of the commandant, never read her father's memoir, saying it did not interest her and that "the Nazis always get a bad press and no one else does." Nonetheless, she criticized Rainer's actions, saying he had not been born at the time, could thus not know what had happened, and so must be "a lying, drug-addicted, fame-seeking, money-hungry, evil young man". For a long time, Inge-Brigitt was secretive about her childhood, including to her own children and the press; journalist and writer Thomas Harding (great-nephew of Hanns Alexander, the man who tracked down and arrested Höss) had to talk to Inge-Brigitt for three years before she agreed to an interview in 2013, the first interview ever given by one of Höss' children, where Inge-Brigitt described him as the "nicest father in the world". She acknowledged that what happened in the Auschwitz camp was "very wrong" and claimed to have been oblivious to the atrocities as a child, knowing only that the camp had prisoners. In a 2021 interview to Harding, her last before her death in 2023, the then 88-year-old Inge-Brigitt, while condemning the atrocities committed at the Auschwitz camp, seemingly defended Höss, stating: "It was not my dad's fault. I don't think he knew what he got into when he started. Because he was very unhappy many times. And when I talked with my mom after all this happened, you know, she told me he was a very unhappy man." When Harding voiced his disagreement with Inge-Brigitt's characterization, she ultimately and reluctantly agreed that Höss was responsible.

== See also ==
- Death Is My Trade (novel)
- Death Is My Trade (film)
- The Zone of Interest (novel)
- The Zone of Interest (film)
- Sophie's Choice (novel)
- Sophie's Choice (film)
- The Commandant's Shadow (documentary)
- Kai Uwe Höss

Military offices
Preceded by None	Commandant of Auschwitz; 4 May 1940 – November 1943	Succeeded by SS-Obersturmbannführer Arthur Liebehenschel
Preceded by None	Chief Commandant (Standortältester) in Auschwitz (mass murder of Hungarian Jews); 8 May 1944 – 29 July 1944	Succeeded by None
