= Blockführer =

Nazi paramilitary rank

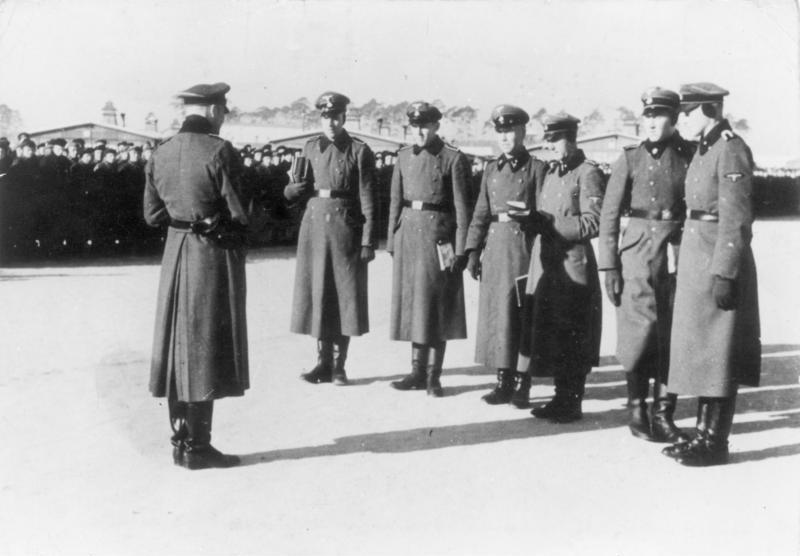
Report Leader Campe with six Block Leaders during a roll call in Sachsenhausen concentration camp, 1936.

Blockführer (Block Leader; female rank name: Blockführerin) was a paramilitary title specific to the SS-Death's Head Units in Concentration Camp Service. An SS-Block Leader was typically in charge of prisoner barracks ranging from two hundred to three hundred concentration camp prisoners; in larger camps, the number of prisoners could reach as high as a thousand. The Block Leader was in charge of daily attendance, supervising daily work details, and distributing rations to prisoners. Assisting in this case were several prisoner trustees, known as kapos. The position of Block Leader was usually held by an SS soldier holding the rank of SS-Corporal or non-commissioned officer rank of SS-Sergeant.

In the Nazi death camps, the task of gassing prisoners with Zyklon B was performed by a Block Leader.

A similar title, known as Blockleiter (Block Warden), also existed in the Nazi Party political organization.

== Sources ==
- Zentner, Christian & Bedürftig, Friedemann, The Encyclopedia of the Third Reich, (Macmillan), New York (1991)
