= Rapportführer =

Paramilitary title in Nazi concentration camps

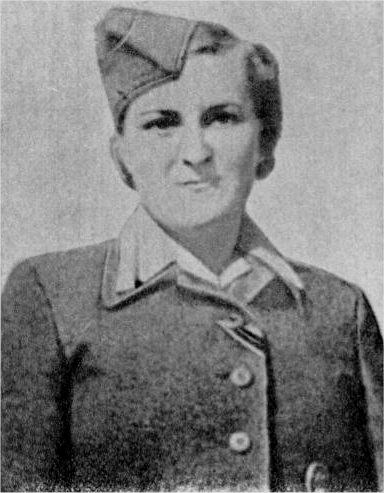
Rapportführerin Hermine Braunsteiner, female concentration camp guard

Rapportführer (Report Leader; feminine: Rapportführerin) was a paramilitary title of the Schutzstaffel (SS), specific to the Totenkopfverbände (Concentration Camp Service). An SS-Rapportführer was usually a mid-level SS-non-commissioned officer (often an Oberscharführer or Hauptscharführer) who served as the commander of a group of Blockführer who themselves were assigned to oversee barracks within a concentration camp.

The primary duty of a Rapportführer was to conduct daily and evening camp roll call, which was usually a long and grueling process involving prisoners standing for sometimes hours on end in all types of weather conditions. The Rapportführer also oversaw camp discipline of prisoners as well as training for junior SS personnel. Rapportführers were known for their brutality, with individuals such as Eric Muhsfeldt and Gustav Wagner holding this position.

In larger camps (such as Auschwitz), the Rapportführer would answer to a Camp Adjutant SS-Officer, but in smaller camps (such as Sobibor) the Rapportführer worked directly for the Camp Commander and served in a type of sergeant major position.

== Sources ==
- Zentner, Christian & Bedürftig, Friedemann, The Encyclopedia of the Third Reich, (Macmillan), New York (1991)
