= Hanns Ludin =

German Nazi diplomat (1905–1947)

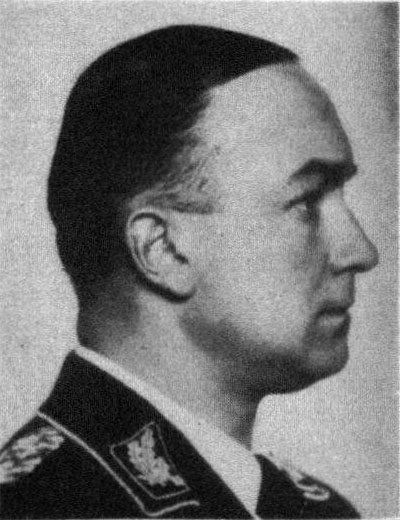
Hanns Ludin, c. 1938

Hanns Elard Ludin (10 June 1905 – 9 December 1947) was a German military officer, Nazi politician, Sturmabteilung general and diplomat. He participated in Holocaust-related actions as the Nazi ambassador to the Slovak Republic. At the end of the Second World War, he was extradited to Czechoslovakia where he was tried, sentenced to death and hanged.

Born in Freiburg to Friedrich and Johanna Ludin, Ludin started his Nazi affiliation in 1930 by joining the Nazi Party, and was arrested for his political activities the same year. He was one of the three defendants in the Ulm Reichswehr trial, in which he and two other Reichswehr officers were tried for attempting to form a Nazi cell within the Reichswehr in Ulm. The officers were accused of infiltrating the Reichswehr with the intent to start a Nazi revolution. In October 1930, all three men were found guilty "preparation of high treason" and each sentenced to 18 months in prison. Imprisoned until June 1931, Ludin joined the Sturmabteilung (SA) on his release.

At the July 1932 parliamentary election. Ludin was elected as a deputy to the Reichstag from electoral constituency 32 (Baden) and he retained this seat until the fall of the Nazi regime in May 1945.

Ludin joined the Foreign Office and became Ambassador to the Slovak Republic in 1941, replacing Manfred von Killinger. Ludin's activities included convincing the Slovak government to comply with deportations for slave labor and providing diplomatic cover to such activities. In 1943, he was promoted to SA-Obergruppenführer.

Ludin was arrested after the war and extradited to Czechoslovakia, where he was tried with SS-Obergruppenführer Hermann Höfle (not to be confused with SS-Sturmbannführer Hermann Julius Höfle). He was sentenced to death and was hanged in Bratislava on 9 December 1947.

He was married to Erla von Jordan (1905 – 1997). Ludin had six children: Erika (1933 – 1997), Barbara (born 1935), Ellen (born 1937), Tilman (1939–1999), Malte (born 1942) and Andrea (born 1943).

== Documentary film ==
Hanns Ludin's youngest son, Malte Ludin, filmed a documentary about the impact of his father's involvement in the Third Reich on his family. The film, 2 oder 3 Dinge, die ich von ihm weiß, had its initial release in 2005. The movie's commercial run in New York City began on 24 January 2007 at the Film Forum.
