= Detlef Siebert =

German screenwriter

Detlef Siebert is a German television writer, director and producer, working in the United Kingdom.

== Biography ==
Siebert began his career at the BBC as assistant producer of the 1997 documentary series The Nazis: A Warning from History.

He wrote, directed and produced the 2001 Bombing Germany episode of the Timewatch series.

He also directed the drama sequences in the 2005 series Auschwitz: The Nazis and the 'Final Solution', wrote, directed and produced the 2006 drama documentary The Somme – From Defeat to Victory, and produced the 2006 series Nuremberg: Nazis on Trial, produced the 2011 docudrama Atlantis: End of a World, Birth of a Legend.

In the 2014 BBC Two documentary, I Was There: The Great War Interviews, Siebert used interviews with eyewitnesses of the First World War filmed by the BBC in the 1960s. Most of the interview material in the film had never been shown and the film garnered critical acclaim.

== Filmography ==
- 1994 Dichter, Tod, und Teufel: Salman Rushdie co-producer/director
- 1997 The Nazis: A Warning from History assistant producer
- 1999 War of the Century assistant producer
- 2001 Timewatch: Bombing Germany producer, director & writer
- 2001 Timewatch: Himmler, Hitler, and the End of the Reich producer, director & writer
- 2005 Auschwitz: The Nazis and the 'Final Solution' drama director
- 2006 The Somme – From Defeat to Victory producer, director & writer
- 2006 Nuremberg: Nazis on Trial series producer
- 2007 Visions of the Future series producer
- 2009 How the Celts Saved Britain executive producer
- 2011 Atlantis: End of a World, Birth of a Legend producer
- 2014 I Was There: The Great War Interviews
- 2016 The Man Who Discovered Capitalism (about Joseph Schumpeter)
