= Azizi Johari =

American model and actress (born 1948)

Playboy centerfold appearance
- June 1975
- Preceded by: Bridgett Rollins
- Succeeded by: Lynn Schiller

Personal details
- Born: August 24, 1948 (age 78) New York City, United States
- Height: 5 ft 6 in (1.68 m)

Azizi Johari is a Black American model and actress who was Playboy magazine's Playmate of the Month for June 1975.

== Early life ==
Azizi Johari was born in New York City (Note: In 1976, Black Stars magazine reported that Johari was born near New Orleans, Louisiana.) on August 24, 1948. Due to her stepfather's military service, her family moved frequently before settling in Seattle, where she attended high school and college. For a time, her family lived in Germany. While in school, she formed a singing group called the Marvelles with two friends and released the single "Call Me Back". She later moved to San Francisco and worked as a stewardess for United Airlines.

== Modeling and acting ==
Johari joined the Black Arts West theatre group and appeared in productions of A Raisin in the Sun, Black Girl and Ladies in Waiting. She had a minor role in the 1974 film McQ.

Herbie Hancock gave her the stage name Azizi Johari, which means "rare jewel" in Kiswahili. She gained attention for the 1973 poster Supernatural Dream, which showed her nude, her face surrounded by smoke and a large Afro. (Note: Johari's Supernatural Dream image was photographed for a calendar that was never published, and was later issued as a poster by The Old School Inc. around 1973. It is briefly visible in Stanley Kubrick's 1980 film The Shining, hanging on the wall of Dick Hallorann's Florida apartment.) Johari had met the poster's photographer while working for United. Among the poster's admirers was Sammy Davis Jr., who hung it in his dressing rooms during tours and hired Johari as a dancer in his troupe. She toured with the show for about a year, visiting New York, Chicago, Honolulu and Miami Beach, playing a comic foil to Davis.

She was photographed nude for Playboy as the June 1975 Playmate of the Month, in a 10-page gatefold spread for which she was paid $6,000 (equivalent to $36,000 in 2025). Johari later wrote she had posed to show the beauty of dark-skinned Black women. The following year, she appeared nude on the cover of Leon Ware's 1976 album Musical Massage.

She was featured in magazines such as Jet and Players, and appeared on several Players covers.

She appeared on television and in several films between 1976 and 1981, including John Cassavetes's The Killing of a Chinese Bookie (1976), starring Ben Gazzara. She was cast in the film through a European film distributor, whom she had first met at a party and spoken with in German. She also was reportedly cast in the science fiction film Assassins in Time in 1979, though it was never released.

== Filmography ==
=== Film ===
Year	Title	Role	Notes
1974	McQ	—	Uncredited
1976	The Killing of a Chinese Bookie	Rachel	—
1979	Dreamer	Lady	—
1979	Rocky II	Ringside girl	Uncredited
1980	Seed of Innocence	Denise	Also released as Teen Mothers
1980	Exit Sunset Boulevard	—	—
1981	Body and Soul	Pussy Willow	—

=== Television ===
Year	Title	Role	Episode or notes
1975	The Six Million Dollar Man	Girl	"Clark Templeton O'Flaherty"
1977	The Richard Pryor Show	Blueberry	—
1977	Redd Foxx TV Special	—	—

== In popular culture ==
The 1987 video game Dungeon Master named one of its playable champions after Johari.

== See also ==
- List of people in Playboy 1970–1979

== Notes ==
Lynnda Kimball	Laura Misch	Ingeborg Sorensen	Victoria Cunningham	Bridgett Rollins	Azizi Johari
Lynn Schiller	Lillian Müller	Mesina Miller	Jill De Vries	Janet Lupo	Nancie Li Brandi
