= Ben Goddard (musical director) =

English musical director, musical supervisor, composer, actor and singer

Ben Young (born 20 April 1973), known professionally as Ben Goddard, is an English musical director, musical supervisor, composer, actor and singer. He was first known for acting roles on stage and screen, and more recently as a musical director and supervisor for theatre and television.

== Early life and education ==
Benjamin Edward William Young was born on 20 April 1973 in Bromley, Kent. He has a BA Hons in Music from the University of Leeds and trained at Guildford School of Acting.

== Career ==
=== Musical direction and supervision ===
As a musical director and supervisor, Goddard's credits include Little Shop of Horrors (New Wolsey Theatre and Birmingham Repertory Theatre), Midsomer Murders, and Quiz. Goddard has been the musical director for the BBC TV series Eastenders since 2012. Regional work includes Mods and Rox and Midsummer Songs (both New Wolsey Theatre), Jackie The Musical (National Tour), Tom Jones Story (National Tour), Roll Over Beethoven (Queen's Theatre, Hornchurch and Belgrade Theatre), and Made in Dagenham (Queen's Theatre, Hornchurch and New Wolsey Theatre).

He was also Musical Supervisor for Oxy and the Morons and Our Blue Heaven (both New Wolsey Theatre), Once (New Wolsey Theatre, Queen's Theatre, Hornchurch and National Tour), The Hired Man (Queen's Theatre, Hornchurch, Hull Truck Theatre and Oldham Coliseum Theatre), Never Lost At Home (New Wolsey Theatre), Trio (New Wolsey Theatre), Then Now And Next (Southwark Playhouse), and The Lion, the Witch and the Wardrobe (National Tour).

Concert and touring work includes the 2023 All Balls and Glitter Tour and the 2025 Revelations Tour with Craig Revel Horwood (National Tours).

=== Stage career ===
As a stage actor, from 1997 to 1998 Goddard began performing various roles in Shakespeare's Much Ado About Nothing and Hamlet at Ludlow Festival and the Royal Exchange. In 2002 he would expand his Shakespearian repertoire at Regent's Park Open Air Theatre, performing in Romeo and Juliet and As You Like It. However it was his breakout role as Judas Iscariot in the 1998–2000 National & European Tours of Jesus Christ Superstar that began to garner him media attention. Goddard's role as Del Copeland alongside Hannah Waddingham's Christine in the original cast of Andrew Lloyd Webber and Ben Elton's The Beautiful Game at Cambridge Theatre, West End, brought further notice throughout 2000 and 2001 until the production closed, due partly to a post-9/11 tourism slump.

Subsequent work in 2004 in Murderous Instincts at The Savoy Theatre, West End and as Arnaud Du Tihl in Martin Guerre in 2007 at the Watermill Theatre led to a significant role as Joe Gillis in Sunset Boulevard at the Watermill Theatre and in the West End in 2008 and 2009. Goddard then performed as Jerry Lee Lewis in the West End production and USA Broadway tour of Million Dollar Quartet from 2011 to 2013.

=== Screen career ===
Goddard began his television and film career in 1996, first appearing as Guy in the BBC production of Bugs and then as Neville in Carlton Television's London Bridge. In 2002 he was cast as Crispin Yates in Lynda La Plante's Trial and Retribution, and in 2006 he appeared as Lt. Walton in the BBC production of The Somme - From Defeat to Victory. In 2007 and 2010 respectively he appeared in the motion picture films Sweeney Todd: The Demon Barber of Fleet Street and Gulliver’s Travels. In 2022 Goddard appeared as himself alongside his longtime friend and professional collaborator Craig Revel Horwood on Channel Four's Celebrity Gogglebox.

=== Recordings ===
The 2000 cast recording of The Beautiful Game, released on Really Useful Records in 2000 features Goddard, as does the 2011 London cast recording of Million Dollar Quartet, released on Rhino Handmade (as Jerry Lee Lewis).

== Nominations ==
Goddard has been nominated for the following awards:

- Best Supporting Actor in a Musical from WhatsOnStage for Jerry Lee Lewis in Million Dollar Quartet (USA Broadway Tour, West End)
- Olivier Award for Best Company Performance as Joe Gillis in Sunset Boulevard (West End, Comedy Theatre).
