= BBC History of World War II =

BBC History of World War II (1989–2005) is a 30-hour, 12-disc collection of 10 BBC television films about World War II. The films include documentaries, docudramas, and "dramatized documentaries" (inter-cutting of historical footage with dramatic recreations).

== The films ==
1. The Nazis: A Warning from History (1997, 6 Episodes, 290 minutes, 4:3 Full screen, 2 Discs)

- Documentary on the reasons behind the rise and fall of the Nazis and of Nazi Germany.

2. The Road to War: Great Britain, Italy, Japan, USA (1989, 2 Episodes, 190 minutes, 4:3 Fullscreen, 1 Disc)

- Documentary on how Germany, Britain, France, Canada, Italy, the Soviet Union, Japan and the USA entered the war. Narrator is Charles Wheeler.

3. Dunkirk (2004, 3 Episodes, 176 minutes, 16:9 Anamorphic, 1 Disc)

- Docudrama on the evacuation from Dunkirk.

4. War of the Century: When Hitler Fought Stalin (1999, 4 Episodes, 190 minutes, 4:3 Fullscreen, 1 Disc)

- Documentary on the Russo-German War.

5. Battle of the Atlantic (2002, 3 Episodes, 146 minutes, 16:9 Anamorphic, 1 Disc)

- Documentary on the U-boats and the Atlantic convoys.

6. Horror in the East: Japan and the Atrocities of World War II (2000, 2 Episodes, 98 minutes, 4:3 Fullscreen, 1 Disc)

- Documentary on the Japanese Army's atrocities in the Asia-Pacific war and why the Japanese fought to the death. Supplements on the Indian Army and the Burma War.

7. Battlefields (2001, 4 Episodes, 194 minutes, 16:9 Anamorphic, 1 Disc)

- Documentary on El Alamein, Monte Cassino, the Battle of Arnhem and RAF Bomber Command [Episode Name: "Bomber"] on the firebombing of German cities. Presenter is Prof. Richard Holmes.

8. D-Day 6.6.1944 (2004, 2 Episodes, 90 minutes, 16:9 Anamorphic, 1 Disc)

- Docudrama on the events surrounding D-Day.

9. D-Day to Berlin (2004, 3 Episodes, 150 minutes, 16:9 Anamorphic, 1 Disc)

- Docudrama on the breakout from Normandy, Operation Market Garden, the Battle of the Bulge and the German surrender. Presenter is Sean Bean.

10. Auschwitz: The Nazis and the 'Final Solution' (2005, 6 Episodes, 300 minutes, 16:9 Anamorphic, 2 Discs)

- "Dramatized documentary" on the Nazis' conceptualisation and implementation of the Final Solution.

== See also ==
- Hiroshima (2005), another "dramatized documentary" marketed as part of the BBC History of World War II
- World War II Behind Closed Doors: Stalin, the Nazis and the West (2008), another BBC "dramatized documentary"
- The World at War, a 1970s series by Thames Television
