= Meade Roberts =

American screenwriter

- Born: June 13, 1930; New York City, New York
- Died: February 10, 1992 (aged 61); New York City, New York U.S.
- Occupation: Screenwriter

Meade Roberts (13 June 1930 in New York City – 10 February 1992 in New York City) was an American screenwriter who collaborated with Tennessee Williams on the screenplays for the films The Fugitive Kind (1960) and Summer and Smoke (1961), both based on plays by Williams. In other work for films, Roberts wrote the screenplay for The Stripper (1963), starring Joanne Woodward, by adapting William Inge's play A Loss of Roses and wrote the screenplay for the movie In the Cool of the Day (1963), starring Peter Finch and Jane Fonda, by adapting Susan Ertz's novel of the same name. Roberts also was an actor in two John Cassavetes films: The Killing of a Chinese Bookie (1976) and Opening Night (1977). Roberts's play A Palm Tree in a Rose Garden (1957) had an off-Broadway run in NYC from November 26, 1957, to January 19, 1958, with Barbara Baxley as Barbara Parris. In 1960, Tomás Milián appeared at Spoleto's Festival dei Due Mondi in Roberts's one-act play Maidens and Mistresses at Home in the Zoo (1958), written specifically for him.

Meade Roberts wrote television scripts for such shows as CBS's Suspense (1949–1955), NBC's The Kate Smith Evening Hour (1951–1952), and CBS's Schlitz Playhouse of Stars (1951–1959). He adapted Henry James's novel The Wings of the Dove for Playhouse 90, which aired January 8, 1959, season 3, episode 14, with Dana Wynter as Kate Croy, James Donald as Merton Densher, and Inga Swenson as Milly Theale. NTA Film Network's Play of the Week aired a teleplay of Roberts's play A Palm Tree in a Rose Garden on April 4, 1960, season 1, episode 26, with Glenda Farrell as Rose Frobisher, Barbara Barrie as Lila Frobisher, Robert Webber as Anton Jonas, and Barbara Baxley as Barbara Parris. In 1970 he originally going to write the script for the film Wuthering Heights, but Patrick Tilley took over.

He died of a heart attack in New York City on February 10, 1992.

== Filmography ==
| Year | Title | Role |
|---|---|---|
| 1976 | The Killing of a Chinese Bookie | Mr. Sophistication |
| 1977 | Opening Night | Eddie Stein |
| 1982 | Forty Deuce | Old John |
