= The Killing of a Chinese Bookie =

1976 film by John Cassavetes

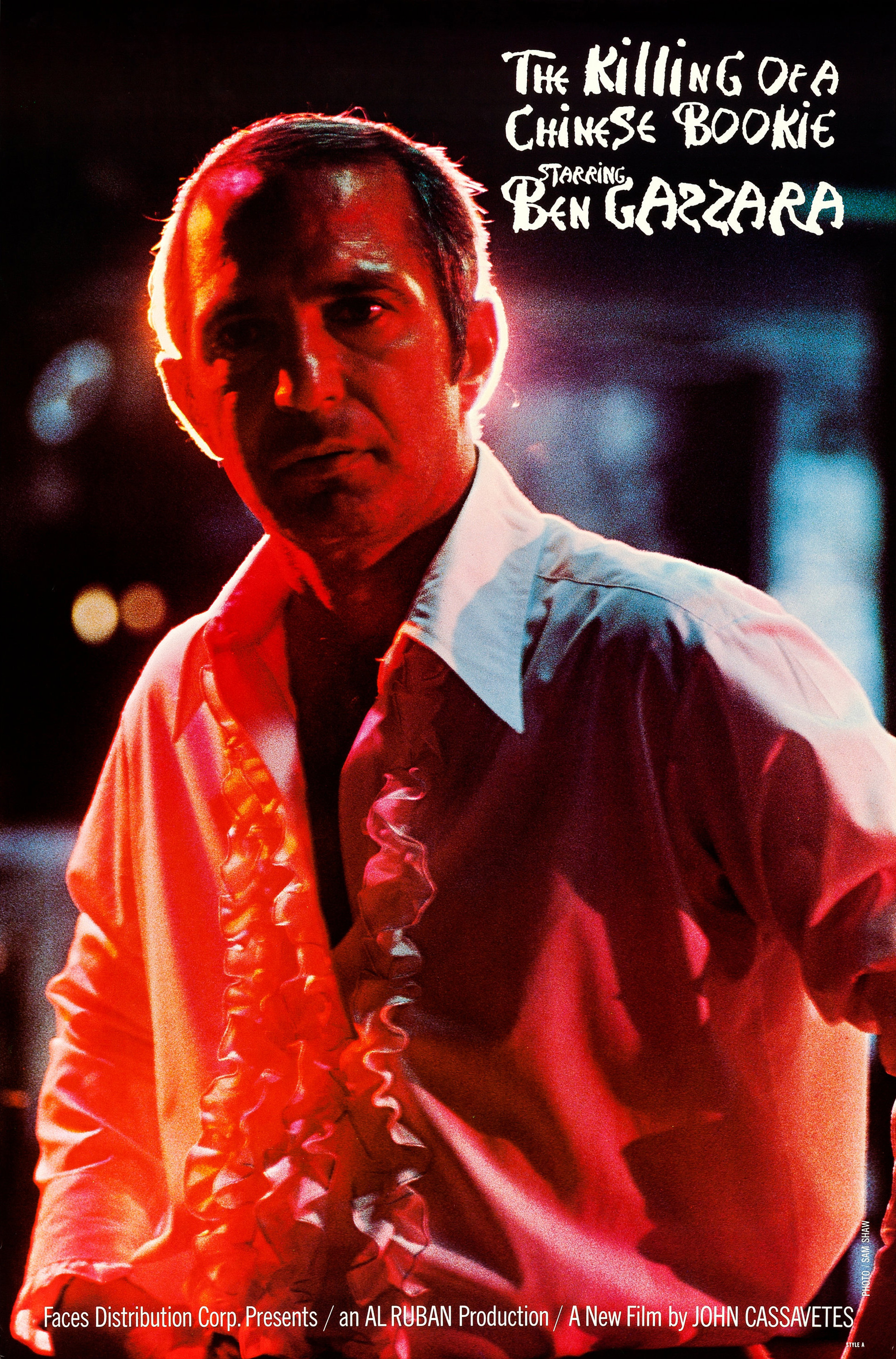
- Theatrical release poster ("Style A")
- Directed by: John Cassavetes
- Written by: John Cassavetes
- Produced by: Al Ruban
- Starring: Ben Gazzara
- Cinematography: Mitchell Breit; Al Ruban
- Edited by: Tom Cornwell
- Music by: Bo Harwood
- Distributed by: Faces Distribution
- Release date: February 15, 1976
- Running time: 135 minutes 108 minutes (Re-release)
- Country: United States
- Language: English

The Killing of a Chinese Bookie is a 1976 American crime film, written and directed by John Cassavetes and starring Ben Gazzara. A rough and gritty film, this is the second of their three collaborations, following Husbands and preceding Opening Night. Timothy Carey, Seymour Cassel, Morgan Woodward, Meade Roberts, and Azizi Johari appear in supporting roles.

Gazzara's character of the formidable strip club owner Cosmo Vittelli was in part based on an impersonation he did for his friend Cassavetes in the 1970s. In an interview for the Criterion Collection in the mid-2000s, Gazzara stated that he believed that Vittelli, who cares deeply about the rather peculiar "art" aspect of his nightclub routines but is faced with patrons who are only there for naked girls and care little about the artistic value of any of the routines, was a double of sorts of Cassavetes himself.

== Plot ==
Cosmo Vittelli owns and operates a strip club, Crazy Horse West, on the Sunset Strip in Los Angeles. Though Cosmo spends a great deal of time and effort designing and choreographing the venue's artistic burlesque act, he fears his customers are there only to see the naked bodies of his strippers. Cosmo makes the final payment on a seven-year gambling debt to a loan shark named Marty, and in return invites him and his mob associates to the club's night act. Eager to celebrate his newfound freedom, Cosmo goes on a night on the town with his three favorite dancers (Margo, Rachel, and Sherry), and subsequently racks up a $23,000 poker debt, returning him to the position he'd just left. Although Cosmo insists he is good for the money over time, Marty's partners force Cosmo to sign over the Crazy Horse West as collateral. Troubled over how to retain his business and resolve the debt, Cosmo drops the girls off at their homes.

The following night, gangster Mort and his associates arrive at the club and order Cosmo to find and kill a bookie named Harold Ling in exchange for wiping out his outstanding debt. When Cosmo procrastinates, Mort has one of his men rough him up and make it clear the killing must be completed immediately. Mort gives Cosmo a gun, a car, and the location of Ling's house. After they explain that the bookie’s house is guarded and booby-trapped, the men give Cosmo a receipt for the money he owes them and encourage him to tear it up, proving that the hit will cancel his debt. Though they insist the target is simply a low-level bookie, they inadvertently reveal his real name as Benny Wu, raising Cosmo's suspicions.

On the freeway heading to Wu's house, a tire on Cosmo's car blows out but he finds a payphone and calls a cab. The cab takes Cosmo to a restaurant where, as instructed, he picks up hamburgers to distract the guard dogs at Wu's home. Making his way to the bookie's room, Cosmo finds Wu naked in his spa. As Cosmo takes aim at the old man, Wu confesses that he has been a bad person and tells Cosmo he is sorry. After killing Wu, Cosmo shoots several bodyguards and makes a run for it, but is shot by a stray bullet in the process.

Cosmo takes a bus, then several cabs to Rachel's house, where he collapses on the bed. Rachel's mother, Betty, whom Cosmo calls "Mom", tends to his wound, but she refuses his request to call a cab to take him to the club. Meanwhile, Mort learns of the successful hit and Cosmo's apparent survival, and orders his right-hand man Flo to kill Cosmo.

Cosmo makes it back to the club, where Flo is waiting for him and tries to persuade him to leave. A topless Rachel approaches their table and a half-delirious Cosmo tells her that he is going to buy her a diamond ring and asks her to tell him that she loves him. Flo drives Cosmo to an abandoned factory, where he tells Cosmo he considers him a friend before passing him on to Mort. Mort admits to Cosmo that Wu was actually a high-ranking Chinese Triad boss and that Cosmo was set up to perform a task that Mort's men found impossible to accomplish, a task he was never meant to survive. Mort claims he can protect Cosmo, while trying to distract him long enough for one of his men to get a clear shot. Cosmo kills Mort and escapes to Betty's house, asking where Rachel is before rambling about his own mother and telling Betty that she's "wonderful". Betty tells Cosmo off, ordering him to leave her and Rachel's house and never come back.

Cosmo returns to the club and talks to his performers, motivating them by telling them that each person has their own truths and sense of happiness. He confesses that he is only happy when he is angry, or when he is playing the role of a person that others want him to be. He encourages the troupe to take on their theatrical personalities so that those in the audience can escape their troubles and also pretend to be who they are not. Cosmo takes the stage and tells the audience they are running late because Rachel has left and confesses to the crowd that he loved her. He walks outside and observes blood dripping from his bullet wound as the show begins.

== Cast ==
- Ben Gazzara as Cosmo Vittelli
- Timothy Carey as Flo
- Seymour Cassel as Mort Weil
- Morgan Woodward as The Boss
- Azizi Johari as Rachel
- Robert Phillips as Phil
- Meade Roberts as Mr. Sophistication
- John Red Kullers as The Accountant
- Al Ruban as Marty Reitz
- Virginia Carrington as Betty
- Alice Friedland as Sherry
- Donna Marie Gordon as Margo
- Haji as Haji
- Carol Warren as Carol
- Derna Wong Davis as Derna
- Kathalina Veniero as Annie
- Val Avery as Blair
- Soto Joe Hugh as Benny Wu
- John Finnegan as Lance
- James Lew as Wu's Bodyguard

== Production ==
Cassavetes and Martin Scorsese came up with the idea for the film together in one night, and Cassavetes then further developed it on his own, inspired by Arthur Penn's movie Mickey One, The Family Rico, and Elaine May's Mikey and Nicky.

For a restaurant scene late in the film, Cassavetes invited a number of prominent Hollywood studio executives to play extras, but then deliberately removed all their faces from the final cut. Cassell related a story of when he and Cassavetes were being robbed at gunpoint, but Cassavetes defused the situation by offering the robber ice cream and a job in his new film (Bookie), which he accepted.

David Bowie sat in on much of the shoot, and is visible in some club audience footage. Cassavetes had a high opinion of Bowie as an actor and held his 1983 film Merry Christmas, Mr. Lawrence, with co-star Ryuichi Sakamoto, as one of his favorite contemporary films.

== Release ==
Alternative poster artwork

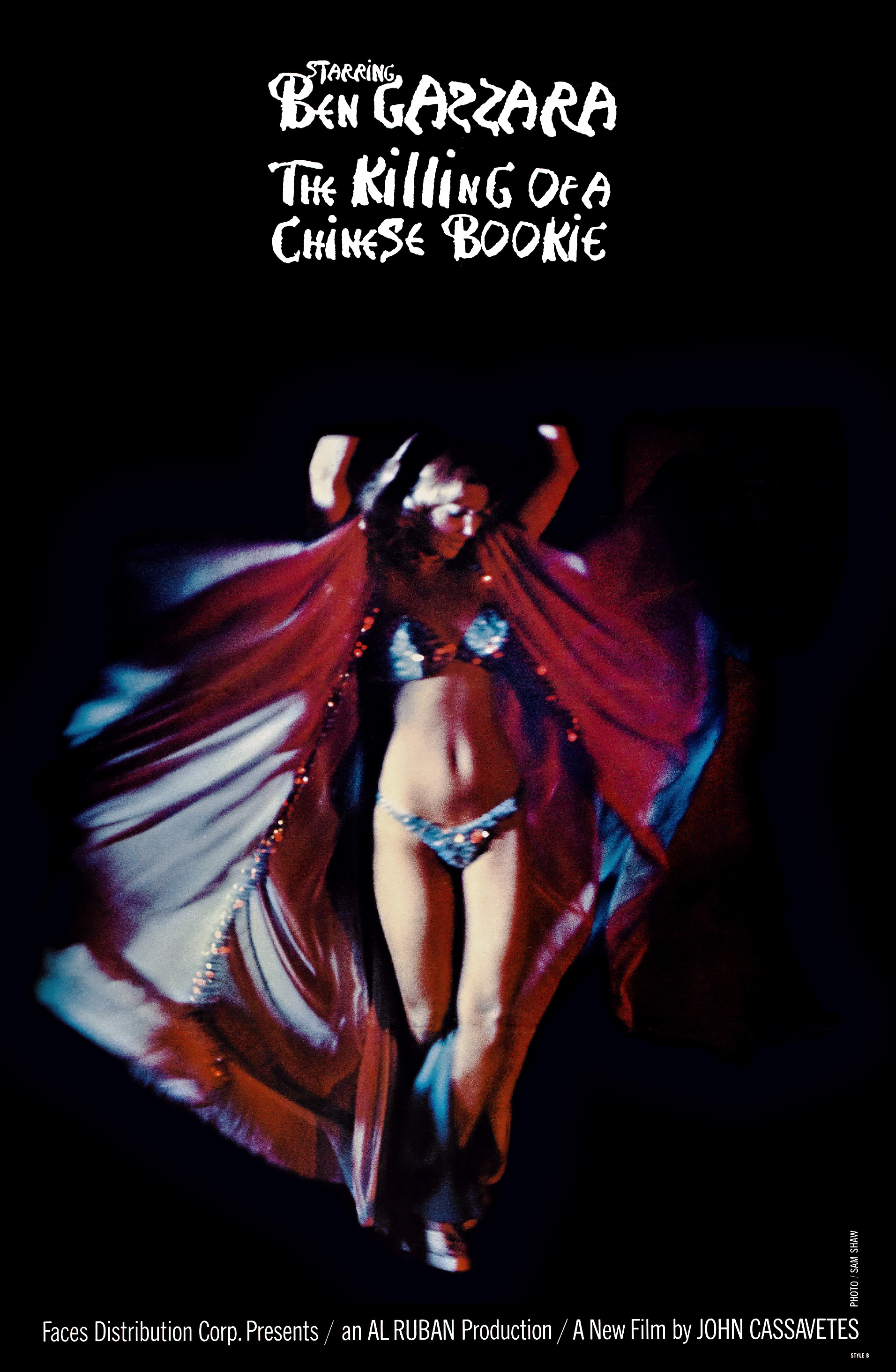
"Style B"

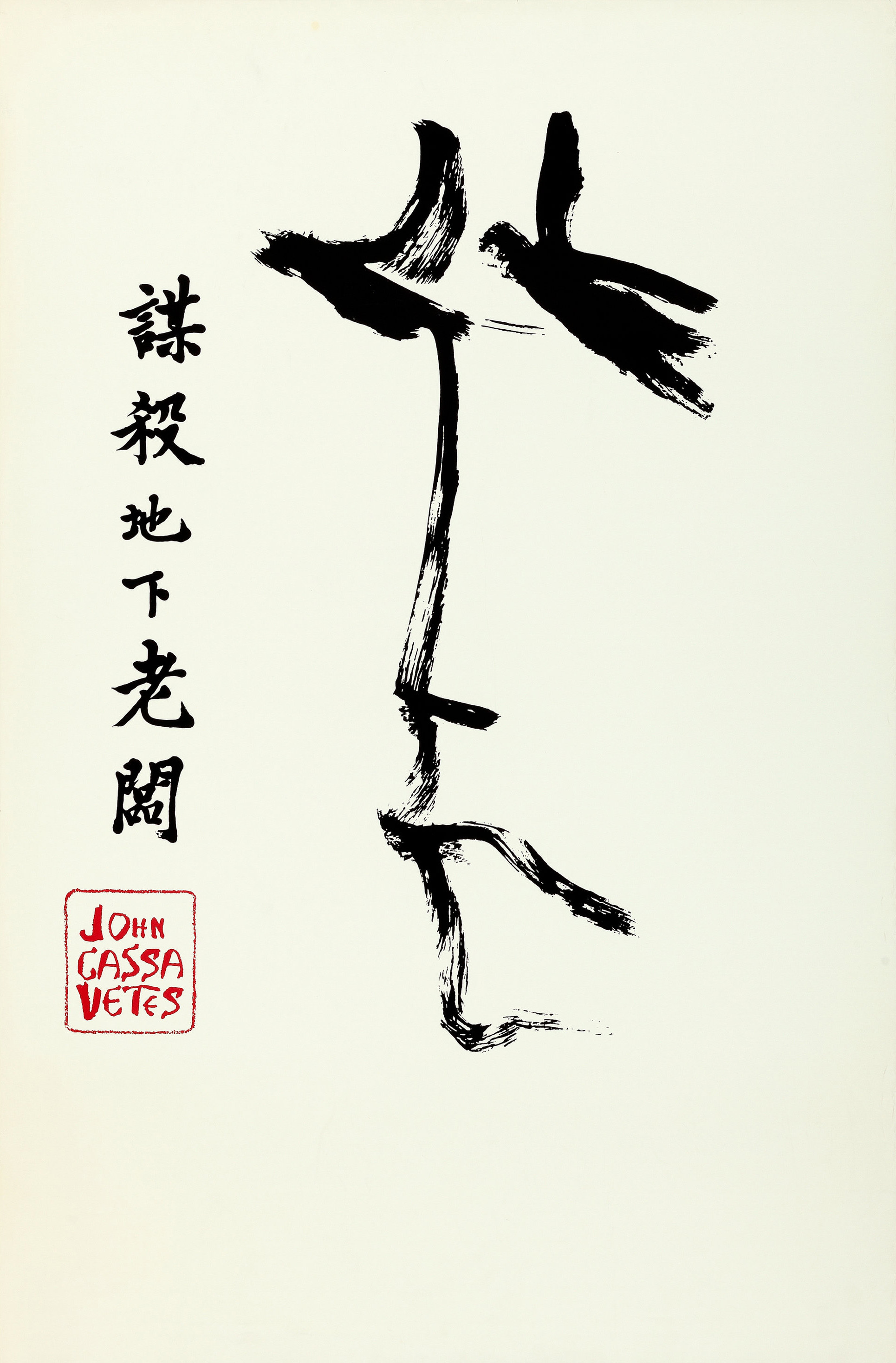
"Calligraphy"

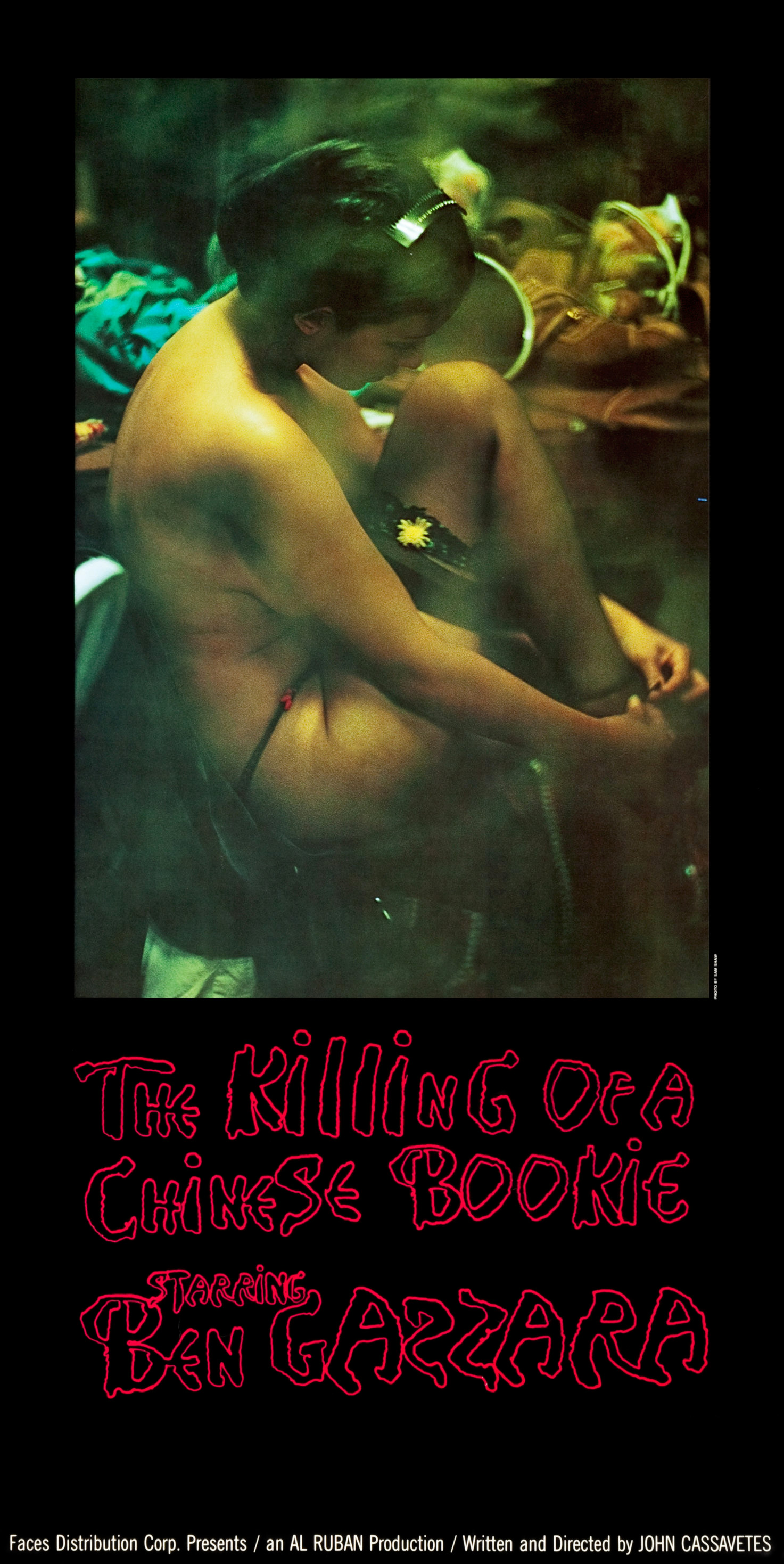
"Stripper"

The film's original release, at 135 minutes in length, was a commercial disappointment and the film was pulled from distribution after only seven days. At a May 17, 2008, George Eastman House screening in Rochester, Gazzara said he "hated" the original cut; "it's too long", he had told Cassavetes.

Eventually, Cassavetes decided to re-edit the film, and it was re-released in 1978 in a new 108-minute cut. The 1978 version is the one that has been in general release since that time, though both versions of the film were issued in The Criterion Collection's John Cassavetes: Five Films box set, marking the first appearance of the 1976 version since its original release.

True to Cassavetes's form, the 108-minute version is not just a simple edit of the 135-minute version. The order of several scenes has been changed, there are different edits of a few scenes, and there are a few segments unique to the 108-minute version. The bulk of the cutting in the 1978 version removed many of the nightclub routines that were in the 1976 version.

== Reception ==
The Killing of a Chinese Bookie received mixed reviews upon its initial release, but has developed a cult following since. Jay Cocks of Time gave the film a positive review, explaining, "When John Cassavetes makes a gangster movie, you can be sure only that it will be like no other. A film maker of vaunting, demanding individuality, Cassavetes is like a jazz soloist, an improviser who tears off on wild riffs from a basic, familiar melody." Vincent Canby of The New York Times thought differently, saying, "The Killing of a Chinese Bookie is like the last three of the director's films (A Woman Under the Influence, Husbands and Minnie and Moskowitz) in the way it resolutely refuses to come to a point strong or interesting enough to support the loving care that's gone into its production, particularly on the part of the actors."

Review aggregator Rotten Tomatoes reports that 79% of 28 film critics have given the film a positive review, with a rating average of 6.45 out of 10. Metacritic, which uses a weighted average, assigned the film a score of 65 out of 100, based on 13 critics, indicating "generally favorable" reviews.

== Unproduced remake ==
During the late 1990s director Brett Ratner acquired the rights to film a remake of The Killing of a Chinese Bookie and recruited John Cassavetes's son Nick to write the screenplay. However, the remake was never filmed.
