= Rüdiger Kuhlbrodt =

German actor and director

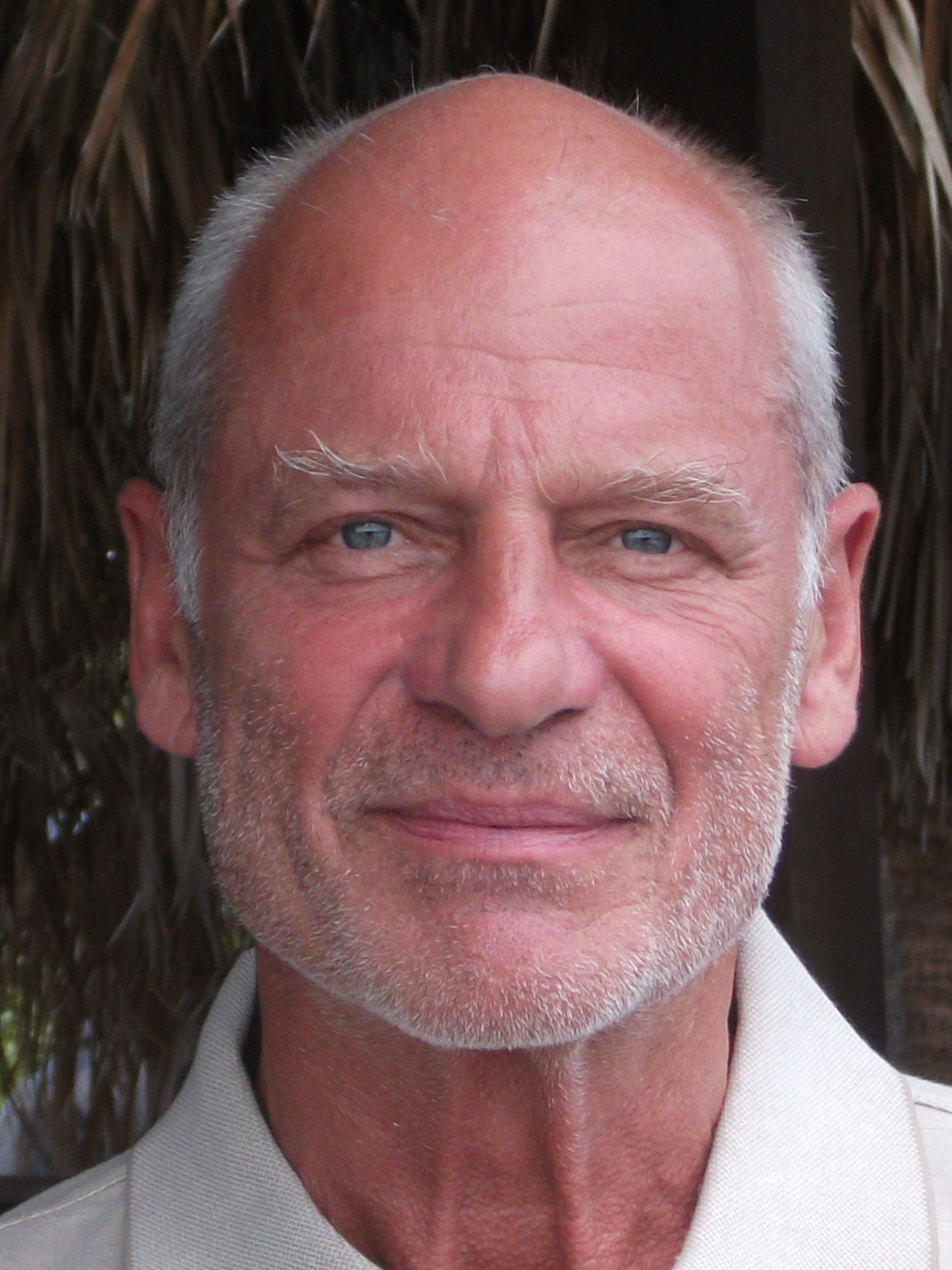
- Born: 20 November 1942; Hamburg, Germany
- Education: Hochschule für Musik und Theater Hamburg
- Occupations: Actor, director

Rüdiger Kuhlbrodt is a German film and theatre actor and director.

== Life ==
Rüdiger Kuhlbrodt was born in Hamburg, Germany, on 20 November 1942. After high school, he studied performing arts at the Hochschule für Musik und Theater Hamburg (University of Music and Theatre Hamburg). Kuhlbrodt joined the Stadttheater Pforzheim and the Mainfranken Theater Würzburg, later the Theater Lübeck and the Städtische Bühnen Münster, and in 1975, the Schauspielhaus Bochum. After a creative break that he spent in California, Kuhlbrodt with other artists established in 1980 an alternative theater project in the former Atlantic Movie Theatre in Düsseldorf. With various projects he toured throughout West German correction institutions and other theater-distant social facilities. In 1983, he was appointed a senior director at the Westfälisches Landestheater. In 1986, he was selected by Peter Zadek to the Deutsches Schauspielhaus in Hamburg.

After a stint at the Theater des Westens in 1992, Kuhlbrodt became a member of the Berliner Ensemble. After 1996, he made guest appearances at the Kammerspiele Berlin, the Deutsche Staatsoper Berlin, the Wiener Festwochen, the Schaubühne am Lehniner Platz, the Schlosspark-Theater Berlin, the Theater der Landeshauptstadt Magdeburg, the Hamburger Kammerspiele, the Ruhrtriennale, the Freilichtspiele Schwäbisch Hall, and the Salzburger Landestheater. In 2002, for political reasons, Kuhlbrodt established the independent group Global Heroes that appeared with the multimedia performance America at war: a mini-series.

Kuhlbrodt lives in Berlin and in Palm Beach, Florida.

== Director ==
- 1968: Max Frisch: The great anger of Philip Hotz
- 1969: James Saunders: The Pedagogue
- 1969: John Mortimer: The Mandatory Mandate
- 1970: Christopher Fry: A Phoenix Too Frequent
- 1971: René de Obaldia: Sea air
- 1973: G.G. del Torre: Presumed Innocent
- 1973: Louise Labé, Pierre de Ronsard: Love and Regret
- 1980: Till Eulenspiegel
- 1983: Janosch: I say you are a bear
- 1984: The Glass Man
- 1984: George Orwell: Nineteen Eighty-Four
- 1985: Hans Fallada: Every Man Dies Alone
- 1985: Germany a wonder fairy tale
- 1987: Henry Miller: Sexus, Plexus and Nexus
- 2007: Erich Kästner: The Blue Book. War diary and novel notes

== Theater roles ==
- 1975: Spring Awakening by Frank Wedekind, Role: Father Gabor, directed by Peter Zadek
- 1976: The Sunshine Boys by Neil Simon, Role: Ben Clark, directed by Hans Lietzau
- 1976: Menschen im Hotel (Grand Hotel) by Vicki Baum, Role: Baron von Geigern, directed by Rosa von Praunheim
- 1977: Das Käthchen von Heilbronn by Heinrich von Kleist, Role: Georg von Waldstätten, directed by Werner Schroeter
- 1978: Der Untertan by Heinrich Mann, Role: Major Fox, directed by Jürgen Flimm
- 1979: Macskajáték (Catsplay) by István Örkény, directed by Jiří Menzel
- 1986: Pravda by Howard Brenton, Role: Michael Quince, directed by Matthias Langhoff
- 1987: Andy by Burkhard Driest, Role: Olaf Wolpe, directed by Peter Zadek
- 1988: The "Lulu" plays Earth Spirit and Pandora's Box by Frank Wedekind, Role: Journalist Heilmann, directed by Peter Zadek
- 1988: Punkt, Punkt, Komma, Strich by Wilfried Minks, Role: Ernst Jandl, directed by Wilfried Minks
- 1989: Reineke Fuchs (Reynard the Fox) by Johann Wolfgang von Goethe, Role: Isegrimm the Wolf, directed by Michael Bogdanov
- 1990: Amphitryon by Heinrich von Kleist, Role: Alcibiades, directed by Niels-Peter Rudolph
- 1992: Der blaue Engel (The Blue Angle) by Heinrich Mann, Role: Konsul Wolters, directed by Peter Zadek
- 1994: Antony and Cleopatra by William Shakespeare, Role: Thidias / Proculeius, directed by Peter Zadek
- 1997: In der Sache J. Robert Oppenheimer (In the matter of J. Robert Oppenheimer) by Heinar Kipphardt, Role: Robert Oppenheimer, directed by Hermann Kleinselbeck
- 1998: Doppelleben Deutsch (German double life) by Marc Pommerening, Role: Johannes R. Becher, directed by Hannes Hametner
- 1998: Histoire de Pygmalion et Don Juan (Ballet), Role: Frederick the Great, directed by David Southerland
- 2000: Hamlet by William Shakespeare, Role: Guildenstern, directed by Peter Zadek
- 2001: Hitler's Doktor Faust by Rolf Hochhuth, Role: Nils Bohr, directed by Rolf Hochhuth
- 2004: Wallenstein by Friedrich Schiller, Role: Wallenstein, directed by Axel Schneider
- 2005: Don Carlos by Friedrich Schiller, Role: Philip II of Spain, directed by Manfred Weiss
- 2008: Maestro by Christoph Klimke, Role: Maestro Karajan, directed by Johann Kresnik

== Filmography ==
=== Cinema ===
- 1980: Exit Sunset Boulevard, directed by Bastian Clevé
- 1987: Der Einbruch (The Burglary), directed by Bettina Woernle
- 1988: Blindman's Ball, directed by Dore O.
- 1991: The Polar Bear King, directed by Ola Solum
- 1994: Das Rätsel Knut Hamsun (The Riddle of Knut Hamsun), directed by Bentein Baarson
- 1998: The Waiting Time, directed by Stuart Olme
- 2006: The Somme – From Defeat to Victory
- 2007: The Baader Meinhof Complex, directed by Uli Edel
- 2009: Blissestraße, directed by Paul Donovan
- 2010: Der ganz große Traum (The Ultimate Big Dream), directed by Sebastian Grobler
- 2013: King Ordinary, directed by David Dietl

=== Television ===
- 1983: Rote Erde (Red Earth), directed by Klaus Emmerich
- 1993: Ispettore Sarti, directed by Giulio Questi
- 1995: Die Angst hat eine kalte Hand (Fear has a cold hand), directed by Matti Geschonnek
- 1999: Virtual Vampires, directed by Michael Busch
- 1998: Die vier Gerechten (The Four Justices), directed by Wolfgang F. Henschel
- 2000: The Tunnel, directed by Roland Suso Richter
- 2004: Tsunami: Terror in the North Sea, directed by Winfried Oelsner
- 2005: Die Bagdadbahn (The Baghdad Railway), directed by Roland May
- 2005: The Airlift (Die Luftbrücke – Nur der Himmel war frei), directed by Dror Zahavi
- 2006: Chubby Me, directed by Thomas Nennstiel
- 2006: Polizeiruf 110, directed by Christine Hartmann
- 2007: Tatort, directed by Angelina Maccarone
- 2008: Puccini - die dunkle Seite des Mondes (Puccini - the dark side of the Moon), directed by Andreas Morell
- 2009: Ein starkes Team, directed by Ulrich Zrenner
- 2010: Schicksalsjahre (The Fateful Years), directed by Miguel Alexandre
- 2011: Alarm für Cobra 11 – Die Autobahnpolizei, directed by Heinz Dietz
- 2011: And all were silent, directed by Dror Zahavi
- 2012: Heiter bis tödlich - Hubert und Staller, directed by Jan Markus Linhof
- 2013: The Jerusalem Syndrome, directed by Dror Zahavi
- 2014: Unexpected, directed by Rainer Kaufmann
