= In the Cool of the Day =

1963 film by Robert Stevens

- Directed by: Robert Stevens
- Screenplay by: Meade Roberts
- Based on: In the Cool of the Day; 1960 novel by Susan Ertz
- Produced by: John Houseman
- Starring: Peter Finch; Jane Fonda; Angela Lansbury
- Cinematography: Peter Newbrook
- Edited by: Thomas Stanford
- Music by: Francis Chagrin
- Distributed by: Metro-Goldwyn-Mayer
- Release date: March 1963
- Running time: 89 minutes
- Countries: United Kingdom; United States
- Language: English
- Budget: $1.5 million

In the Cool of the Day is a 1963 British-American romantic drama film directed by Robert Stevens and starring Peter Finch, Jane Fonda, Angela Lansbury, Arthur Hill, and Constance Cummings. It was written by Meade Roberts based on the novel of the same title by Susan Ertz, and released by Metro-Goldwyn-Mayer in Metrocolor and Panavision.

== Plot ==
Christine Bonner is a wealthy, beautiful young American woman with chronic health problems. She has been separated from her adoring but overly-protective husband Sam, but agrees to return to him. She meets an English friend of Sam's, a writer and publishing-company executive, Murray Logan, who shares her great interest in Greece.

Logan also is unhappily married because his vicious and shallow wife, Sybil, blames him for an automobile accident that scarred her and killed their son. Christine and Murray meet again in England and their attraction grows.

The two couples plan to vacation together in Greece, but Sam must stay home because of a family illness. Murray and Christine fall in love as they visit Greek ruins and other tourist attractions.

Sybil, besides being bored with the cultural landmarks, realizes what is happening and writes Sam in New York. She then tells Murray she is leaving him, running off to the Riviera for a fling with an Englishman she met in Greece. She tells Christine that “he’s all yours.”

Hearing that Christine’s controlling mother is pursuing them, they continue their travels, eventually making love. Christine’s mother finds them and takes her away. Christine falls ill from the stress and exertion and, according to Sam, refuses to fight for her life; she eventually contracts pneumonia.

Sam suggests that Murray visit the hospital. Before dying, Christine tells Murray she did not want him to have to deal with her chronic illness. She makes Murray promise to do what they would have done together. He continues his travels in Greece.

== Cast ==
- Peter Finch as Murray Logan
- Jane Fonda as Christine Bonner
- Angela Lansbury as Sybil Logan
- Arthur Hill as Sam Bonner
- Constance Cummings as Mrs. Nina Gellert
- Alexander Knox as Frederick Bonner
- Nigel Davenport as Leonard Groves
- John Le Mesurier as Dr. Arraman
- Alec McCowen as Dickie Bayliss
- Valerie Taylor as Lily Kendrick
- Andreas Markos as Andreas

== Production ==
The novel was published in 1960. The New York Times called it "a mixture of high romance and exotic travelogue".

Film rights were bought by MGM, who assigned John Houseman to produce. Houseman had just returned to the studio after a six year absence. Meade Roberts, who had written a TV adaptation of Wings of the Dove for Houseman, was working on the script by January 1961. In July Robert Stevens was announced as director; it was the second of a two picture deal with MGM, the first being I Thank a Fool. Stevens had worked with Houseman several times on television.

In February 1962, Houseman said the film was in planning stages and described the project as "essentially it is a romantic drama dealing with marital problems, the settings of which are New York, Connecticut, London and Greece. No cast as yet?"

Peter Finch, who had just made I Thank a Fool with Stevens, was the first cast member announced. In May 1962 MGM signed Jane Fonda, who had just made Period of Adjustment (1962) with the studio, would star.

Filming took place in August 1962. It was made on locations in London, Greece and at MGM-British Studios, Borehamwood, Herts. The production schedule was hampered by the fact Jane Fonda was required back in New York at a certain date to begin rehearsals for a play. Houseman joked that the film was split into two sections, "Jane Fonda" and "post-Jane Fonda".

== Reception ==
The Monthly Film Bulletin wrote: "Flashes of rich self-parody alone distinguish this mixture of sentimental tragedy and Greek tourist pamphlet. ... And even the title itself seems a black joke at the expense of the heroine, who is last seen fading away in an oxygen tent from the disease which her husband insistently calls 'namonia'."

Boxoffice wrote: "Some breathtakingly beautiful backgrounds of modern and ancient Greece and an outstanding portrayal of an embittered wife by Angela Lansbury fail to compensate for the inept performance by Jane Fonda in this dull and generally lifeless drama."

On the January 19, 2018 episode of Watch What Happens Live, Fonda stated it was the worst film she'd ever made and she wished it had never been filmed, stating that it was so bad that she wasn't even certain if it had been released.
