= Alisdair Simpson =

British actor

Alisdair Simpson (born 31 December 1969) is a British actor, voice-over artist and narrator. He has a distinctive, masculine voice, making him a popular and recognisable narrator of documentaries on television.

Alisdair plays Otto in the PlayStation game Final Fantasy XVI (2023).

He was Ser Donnel Waynwood in Series Four of Game of Thrones and between 2014 and 2016 he was Chapman Carter in War Horse at The New London Theatre.

He was Richard in the BAFTA-winning and Oscar-nominated The Bigger Picture, a short animation film directed by Daisy Jacobs.

He has narrated over 300 documentaries including Pompeii: The Last Day, Lost Land of the Jaguar, Expedition Borneo, Operation Iceberg, Doctors in the Death Zone, The Somme – From Defeat to Victory for the BBC. Other programmes for WMR broadcast on the Yesterday include: Nazi Hunters, Nazi Collaborators, Secret War, Great Crimes and Trials and Black Ops.

== Biography and professional career ==
Simpson went to the Bristol Old Vic Theatre School and graduated in 1995.

His professional stage debut was at the Royal Exchange, Manchester in Tartuffe by Molière. He went on to work at Stratford and London in The White Devil, Troilus and Cressida and Three Hours after Marriage (1996/97) for the RSC. He played the King of France in Yukio Ninagawa's 1999/2000 production of King Lear in Tokyo, London and Stratford and Captain Horster in Trevor Nunn's 1997 production of Ibsen's An Enemy of the People at the National Theatre and the Ahmanson Theatre in Los Angeles.

He was Achilles in Troilus and Cressida for Shakespeare at the Tobacco Factory in Bristol in 2003. Other roles include Roy in Neville's Island at the Watermill Theatre, Gerald Croft on tour in Stephen Daldry's An Inspector Calls and Richard in The Years Between at the Royal in Northampton. In 2008 he appeared at the Young Vic in an opera based on David Lynch's Lost Highway. From 2014–2016 he played Chapman Carter in War Horse at The New London Theatre.

On television he has appeared in programmes such as Game of Thrones, No Bananas, Soldier Soldier, Men Behaving Badly, Teachers, Spooks, The Worst Week of My Life, Broken News, The Bill, Casualty and Dream Team.

== Narrator ==
Simpson has narrated over 250 documentaries and he has voiced commercial campaigns for many companies. He has voiced audio guides for the Metropolitan Museum of Modern Art, New York and various corporate pieces.

== Filmography ==
- No Bananas (1996)
- Soldier Soldier (1996)
- Men Behaving Badly (1997)
- Casualty (2001)
- Doctors (2001)
- The Bill (2003, 2005)
- Spooks (2004)
- Genghis Khan (Narration) (2005)
- Broken News (2005)
- The Worst Week of My Life (2005)
- Waking the Dead (2007)
- Sea of Souls (2007)
- The Whistleblowers (2007)
- Pacific Abyss (2008)
- Game of Thrones (2014)
- Get Santa (2014)

=== Narration ===
- Pompeii: The Last Day (Narration) (2003)
- Supervolcano: The Truth About Yellowstone (Narration) (2005)
- The Somme – From Defeat to Victory (Narration) (2006)
- The Science of Superstorms (Narration) (2007)
- Expedition Borneo (Narration) (2007)
- Lost Land of the Jaguar (Narration) (2008)
- Ancient Rome (Narration)
- Ancient MegaStructures (Narration)
- 1000 Ways to Die (Narration) (2008)
- Nazi Hunters (Narration) (2010)
- Great Crimes and Trials (Narration) (2011)
- Secret War (Narration) (2012)
- Black Ops (Narration) (2012, 2014)
- Myth Hunters (aka Raiders of the Lost Past) (Narration) (2013-2015)
- Ancient Black Ops (Narration) (2014)
- Operation Gold Rush with Dan Snow (2016) (Narration)
- Hitler's Circle of Evil (2017) (Narration)

== Other works ==
In 1996 Simpson appeared in the John Webster play The White Devil produced by the Royal Shakespeare Company at the Swan Theatre, Stratford-upon-Avon, England.

== See also ==
- Voice-over
- Documentary film
- Docudrama
