= Horror in the East =

- DVD cover
- Written by: Laurence Rees
- Directed by: Laurence Rees & Martina Balazova& Fumio Kanda
- Narrated by: Samuel West; Edward Herrmann
- Country of origin: United Kingdom
- Original language: English

Production
- Producer: Laurence Rees

Original release
- Release: 2000

Horror in the East: Japan and the Atrocities of World War II (2000) is a two-part BBC documentary film that examines certain actions, including atrocities, and attitudes, of the Imperial Japanese Army in the lead up to and during World War II. The film also examines attitudes held by the British and Americans, toward the Japanese. It was written and produced by Laurence Rees and narrated by Samuel West.

== Synopsis ==
In the First World War the Japanese fought on the same side as the British and captured German soldiers who were fighting in Asia. They were treated well, even, following an Imperial Order of 1882, 'as guests'. The question arises: "How could the Japanese behave with such kindness towards their prisoners in World War I and then, less than thirty years later, act with such cruelty?"

== Part One – Turning Against the West ==
In the opening decades of the twentieth century Japan appeared enthusiastically to adopt western values, 'from dancing to democracy'. As far back as 1885 a Japanese academic had coined what became a popular slogan – Abandon Asia, go for the West. Crown Prince Hirohito had visited London in the early 1920s.

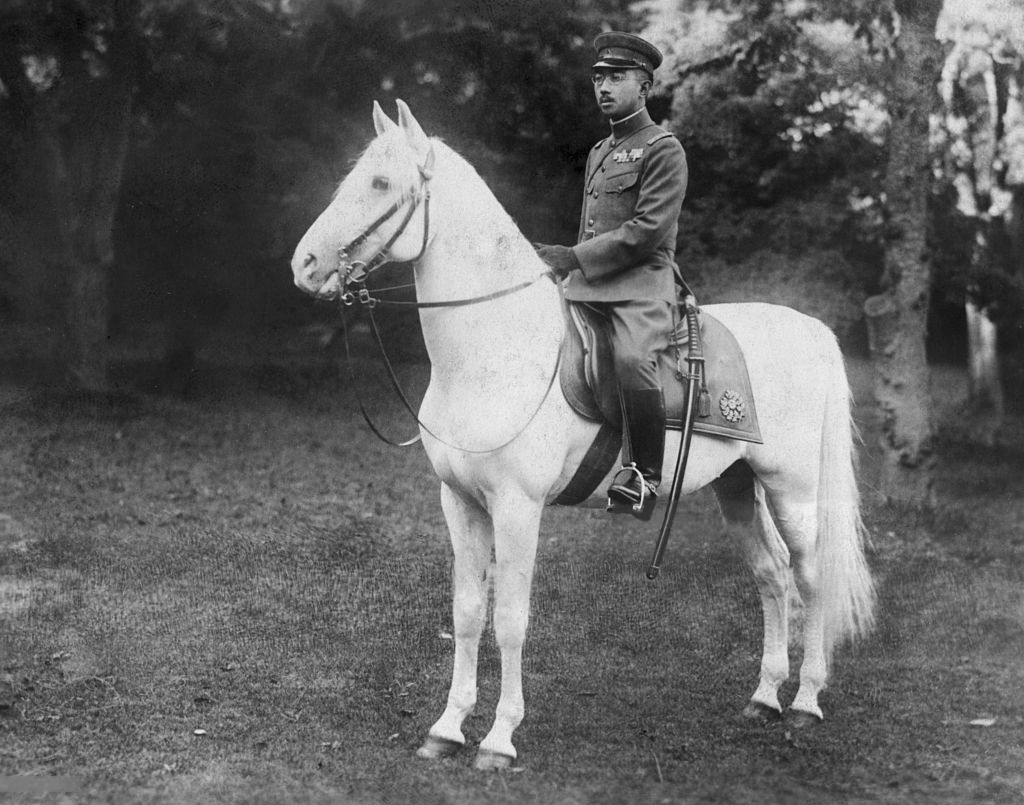
"In the 1920s the Japanese were being taught that their emperor was more than just a mere human, he was a living god – it was in the interests of one group more than any other that the Emperor be perceived as an all-powerful living god – the armed forces."

Like the rest of the country, the Japanese monarchy was changing too – but not in a way that made it resemble Western royalty. In the 1920s the Japanese were being taught that their emperor, living in a 280-acre (1.1 km^{2}) park in central Tokyo, was more than just a mere human being – he was called a living god. Children were educated to think of the emperor as a god in the form of a human being. In Japan it was in the interests of one group more than any other that the emperor be perceived as an all powerful living god – the armed forces. Only ultimately accountable to their supreme commander Hirohito, as long as they acted in the name of their 'divine' emperor, elected Japanese politicians found it almost impossible to control them – and by the late 1920s many within the army thought that Japan should act decisively, and expand. Masatake Okumiya (Japanese Imperial Navy): "Japan's population was increasing – its natural resources could not sustain such an increase. Ideally we hoped to receive co-operation from other countries to solve the problem but, back then, the world was under the control of the west and a peaceful solution seemed impossible. We decided, as Britain, America and France had done in the past from time to time, to use force to solve the problem." By the early 1930s western countries had colonized much of Asia.

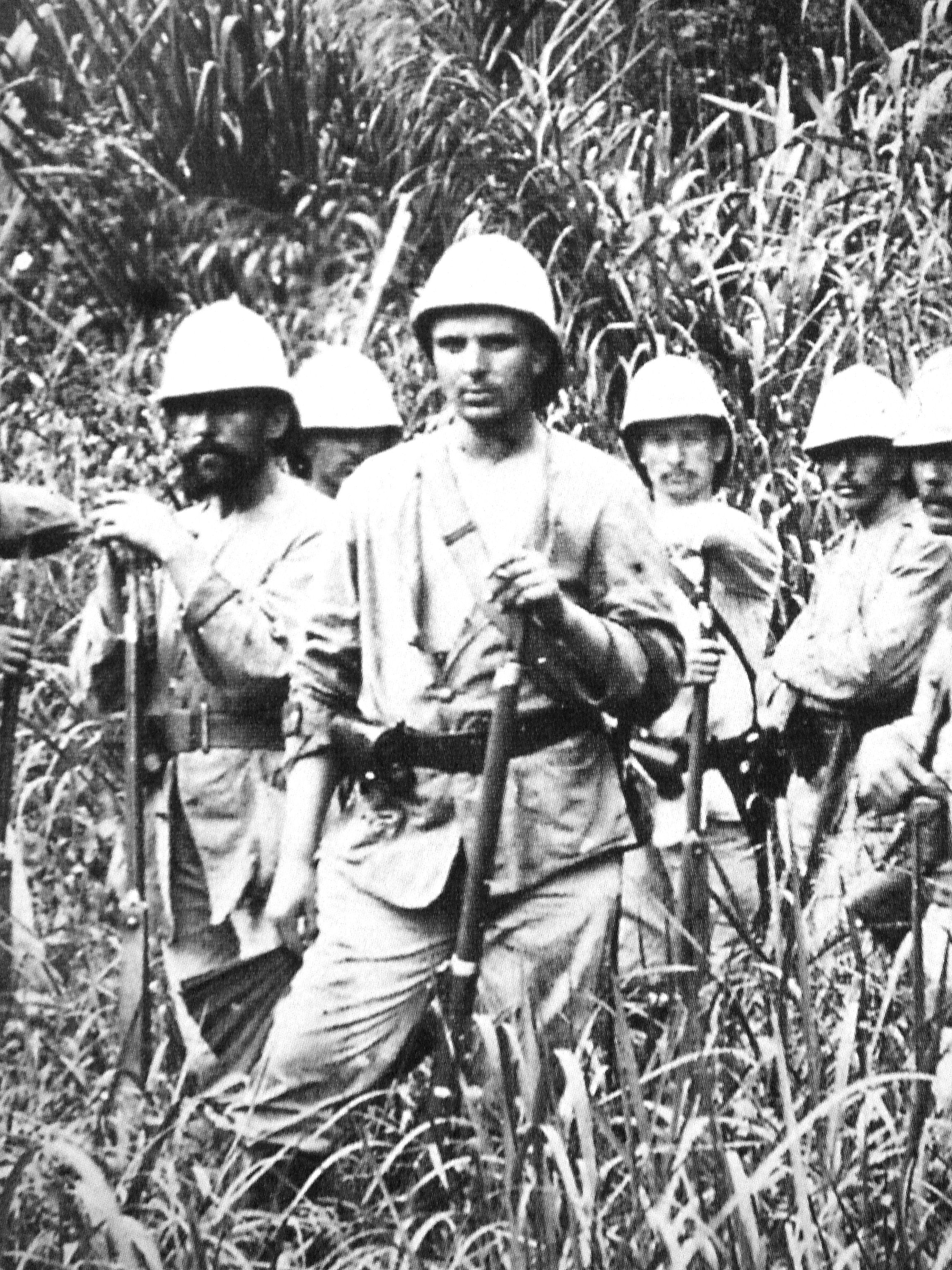
By the early 1930s western countries had colonized much of Asia.." photo: French soldiers in the Tonkin circa 1890

Britain – Hong Kong, Burma, Malaya; Holland – Dutch East Indies; U.S – Philippines; France – French Indochina.

Japan, late on the scene, only had under its control, Taiwan, a few islands in the Pacific, and Korea. In 1931, the Japanese army launched an attack on Manchuria. At the League of Nations in Geneva the Japanese actions were condemned. Japan left the League accusing the Western powers of hypocrisy. In Japan, in face of growing economic depression and a sense of the West's double standards, the call was to expand even further and conquer more territory within Asia. By 1937 the Japanese army was five times what it had been around 1900. Many in the military thought that in an army that had grown so much, to maintain discipline, it was necessary to make the training of recruits more brutal. If the soldiers made the smallest mistake they were beaten, with fists or bamboo sticks. Recruits were instructed also to hit each other. And the Japanese military did not just want to mould their own soldiers but the general population too. Japanese who adopted western values were ridiculed, women who rejected a tradition of subservience were attacked. Many ordinary Japanese, as well as politicians and businesspeople, now supported the drive toward a bigger empire on the Asian mainland, and the minority who openly opposed military expansion risked assassination. Seven prominent Japanese, including two Prime Ministers, were murdered by army officers during the 1930s. Seeking to create a giant colony the Imperial army moved in 1937 into eastern China. The Chinese were not worthy of the land according to the dominant ideology; they were called bugs, animals, below-human. Yoshio Tsuchiya, (Japanese Secret Military Police):" The Chinese were inferior – didn't belong to the human race. That was the way we looked at it." In December 1937 the Japanese Army reached the then capital of China, Nanjing. (Film taken by John Magee is shown). Men were set on fire, women beaten, bayoneted, raped. After Nanjing atrocities followed in the Chinese countryside – the Chinese used for bayonet practice. Yoshio Tsuchiya (imprisoned 1950-56 for war crimes): " The first time you still have a conscience and feel bad, but if you are honoured and given merit and praised, that will be the driving power for the second time – after the second time I didn't feel anything." A soldier is asked why he felt no guilt or shame raping and killing women. He replies : " Because I was fighting for the emperor. He was a god; in the name of the emperor we could do whatever we wanted against the Chinese." Meanwhile the god-emperor of Japan spent most of his time secluded behind the walls of his palace. Even today opinion is divided among historians as to the extent the emperor knew of the barbaric crimes his soldiers were committing in China. " What is certain is that no evidence has surfaced that he ever attempted to hold his soldiers to account for their vicious conduct in China" Rees's film concludes.

Representative examples are then given of pre-Pearl Harbor attitudes towards the Japanese amongst the British and Americans. Sir Robert Brooke-Popham, overall Commander in Chief of the British in the Far East is quoted, and Gene La Rocque (USS Macdonough (DD-351) :" Our concept of the Japanese prior to Pearl Harbor was that they were a weak, not very sophisticated people..so foreign to us ..just of small stature, not a very friendly but also not a very intelligent group of people – obviously, of course, we were wrong."

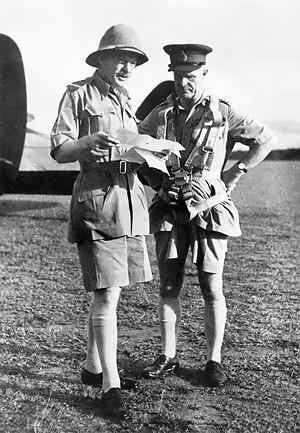
Robert Brooke-Popham (at left) writing in January 1941 – " I had a good view across the barbed wire of various sub-human specimens which I was informed were Japanese soldiers. If these represent the average of the Japanese army I cannot believe they would form an intelligent fighting force."

But there was another western nation which did value the Japanese – Nazi Germany. Indeed, Nazi Germany and Imperial Japan wanted to form an alliance. A formal treaty of alliance was signed between Germany, Japan and Italy on 27 September 1940. Japan used the moment to move into northern Indo-China. This had been a French colony but the Germans had just overrun France so for the Japanese it was ripe for the picking. Japan wanted to create a greater East Asia co-prosperity sphere. The slogan was Asia for the Asians – in essence the locals were swapping one colonial master for another. In Washington the American government, nervous about Japanese colonial intentions, announced that fuel sales to Japan would be suspended if Japan did not reconsider her aggressive actions. With no fuel resources of its own Japan believed it could now either give up its imperial ambitions, or fight the Americans. They attacked Pearl Harbor and, moments after, attacked Hong Kong. As the Japanese advanced into Hong Kong the Chinese inhabitants of the city became a particular target. Rees's film interviews too a British nurse who tells of how, on 25 December 1941, the day of the British surrender, – nurses at the makeshift hospital at the Hong Kong Jockey Club were raped.

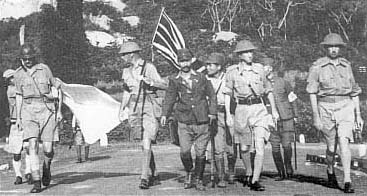
By the spring of 1942 – Singapore (above), Burma, Malaya, and the Philippines were under Japanese control.

By the spring of 1942, Singapore, Burma, Malaya, and the Philippines all fell to the Japanese. Japanese newsreel and commentary :" 60,000 prisoners were lined up along the road so that they could have the honour of seeing the great commander Yamashita. The prisoners consisted of soldiers from Britain, Malaya, Australia, India, a parade of mongrel troops." About 350000 POWs eventually fell into Japanese hands in south-east Asia. More than one in four died in captivity.

== Part Two – Death before Surrender ==
Writer-producer Laurence Rees looks at the Kamikaze phenomenon – " What could be more impossible to understand?" [yet] he says, "one of the most extraordinary things which making the series has done is this – I think I understand now why some of them did it, down to a meeting with a kamikaze pilot, he actually volunteered to become a pilot – he explained the dreadful social pressure that he and his family were living under – if he didn't go to volunteer he knew his family would be ostracised, shunned, – from his point of view it was a sensible, sane thing to do."

When U.S. Marines tried to re-take Japanese-held islands like Tarawa in 1943, the ferocious way in which the Japanese were prepared to fight to the death did not make the Americans respect them more. To many Americans, their refusal to surrender, like their attack on Pearl Harbor and their mistreatment of prisoners, became another sign they were a dishonourable foe. Michael Witowich: "I thought they were very cruel, sadistic, and they wanted to die for their emperor and we had to go on and help them die for their emperor." (The film soundtrack plays an excerpt from We're gonna have to slap, the dirty little jap, recorded New York, 18 February 1942). Gene La Rocque (USS MacDonough): "We had been taught that the Japanese were sub-human when we got into the attack, but of course we had no love for Hitler, or the Nazis – but we also had many people in America of German descent, Italian – it was an entirely different view we had of the Italians, of the Germans, than we had of the Japanese." Rees's documentary shows a photo published in the war in Life – the girlfriend of an American sailor next to a souvenir from him – the skull of a Japanese signed by her boyfriend's comrades.

Japanese soldiers fighting the Australians in New Guinea committed cannibalism. Japanese forces were sent to New Guinea in 1942 but without sufficient preparation – they were simply abandoned. In late 1943, forbidden to surrender and cut off from their supplies, they began to starve – some resorted to cannibalism of their own and enemy dead. According to Professor Yuki Tanaka: "The cannibalism was organised group practice, rather than individually practised." A Japanese major-general wrote an order prohibiting the eating of human flesh but this meant flesh "excluding enemy flesh".

The first signs that large numbers of civilians as well as soldiers might be prepared to die for their emperor rather than surrender came in 1944, 1,400 miles (2,300 km) south of the home islands of Japan, on the island of Saipan. Japanese propaganda about Saipan emphasised the nobility of dying in the struggle against the British and Americans. With the capture of islands like Tinian and Saipan, heavy bombers were now in easier range of targets on the home islands of Japan and the Allies now launched the biggest aerial bombardment the world had ever seen – more than 160000 tonnes of bombs were dropped on Japan in an effort to make the Japanese accept unconditional surrender.

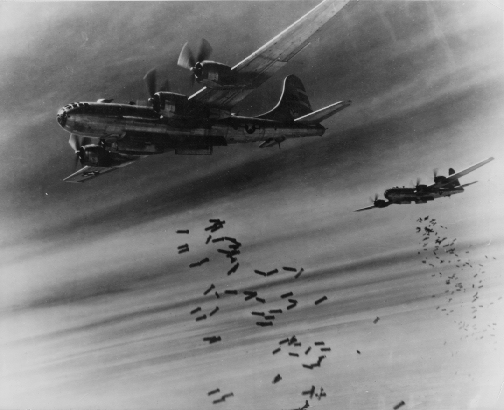
With the capture of islands like Saipan, heavy bombers were now in easier range of targets on the home islands of Japan – the Allies now launched the biggest aerial bombardment the world had ever seen.

On 10 March 1945 Tokyo was fire bombed. Over 300 Boeing B-29 bombers dropped incendiaries which caused a fire storm. About 100,000 died. Despite the destruction in Tokyo opinion was still divided in the Japanese government in the months that followed about what should be done. Accepting unconditional surrender might, some feared, mean the elimination of the institution of the emperor itself. Hirohito and his military leaders believed that, in order to negotiate a more advantageous peace, Japan needed to win one big victory – and the Kamikaze would provide the means. Sporadic isolated kamikaze attacks had occurred in 1944 – now in the spring of 1945 kamikazes were to sortie en masse for the first time. A student from Tokashiki Island: "I didn't think that they were wasting their lives, I believed they were sacrificing their lives for their country. The Japanese people belonged to the emperor – we were his children." The testimony of a pilot suggests that not all kamikaze volunteered as freely as the propaganda sometimes suggested. Kenichiro Oonuki: " All the fighter pilots, about 150 of us at the training base, were called in – a senior officer told us they were recruiting people for a special mission. They said, 'If you go on this mission, you won't come back alive.' Everyone thought this was ridiculous and nobody really was ready to go. We wanted to answer, 'No, I don't want to go'..But later on we thought, 'Wait, if we want to say no, can we really say it, can we say no to this officer?..We told each other that we should calm down and think about the consequences..if people rejected the offer they might be shunned and sent to the most severe battlefront in the south and would meet certain death anyway – then when their family was informed of this, how would they feel? They would be ostracised from the community...so nobody wanted to volunteer but everybody did.." The biggest kamikaze assault of the war was on the British and American fleets during the battle for Okinawa in the spring of 1945.

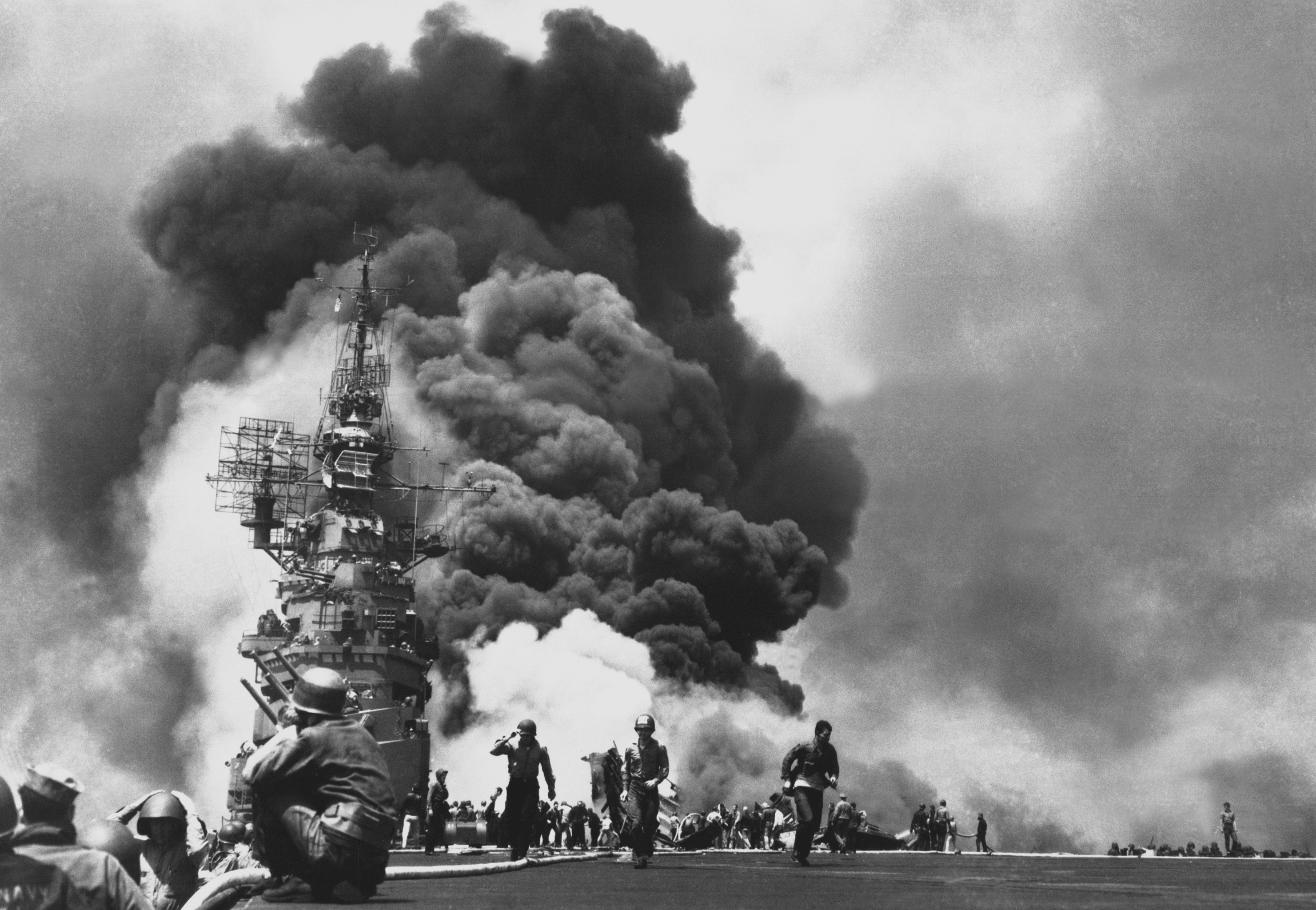
The biggest Kamikaze assault of the war was on the British and American fleets during the battle for Okinawa in the spring of 1945

The British warships with their armoured decks did not suffer as much under kamikaze attacks as the Americans. In March 1945 as the kamikaze flew around them, the Americans landed on the small island of Tokishiki. As on Saipan, the civilians were told by the Japanese army that the Americans would rape and murder them and encouraged them to adopt kamikaze tactics. To some they gave two hand grenades – one to throw at the Americans, the other to blow themselves up with. Shigeaki Kingjou, a student in 1945, looking back in the year 2000: "I think we were dreadfully manipulated – as I got older, my soul started to suffer. 55 years since the end of the war and I still suffer today." By the spring of 1945, the Japanese empire had been pulled apart. Now the Imperial Japanese Army ordered a heroic stand to be made on Okinawa, less than 1,000 miles (1,600 km) from Tokyo.

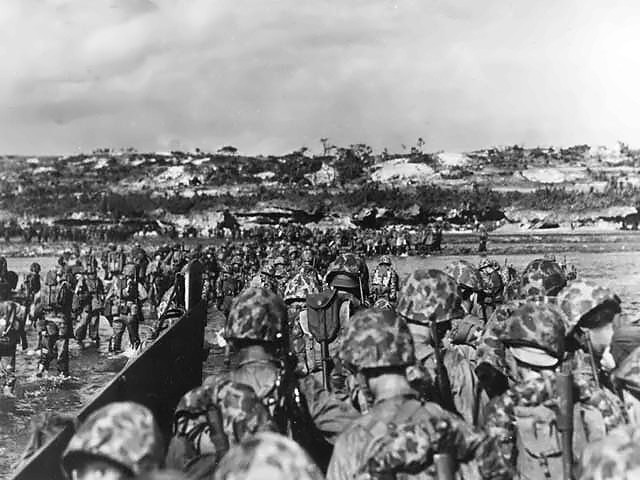
The Americans expected the Japanese to defend the beaches on Okinawa – but on 1 April 1945 when 50000 American troops came ashore they found their arrival virtually unopposed.

The Americans expected the Japanese to defend the beaches on Okinawa but on 1 April 1945 when 50000 American troops came ashore they found their arrival virtually unopposed. But more than 80000 Japanese troops were dug into the fabric of the island interior, some in concrete pill boxes underneath the trees. In Okinawa, as the Americans pushed to the south of the island there were many civilian suicides, some thousand at Cape Kyan. Once more the Japanese military played a crucial role in encouraging the civilian population to kill themselves – on nearby islands where there were no Japanese soldiers there were no mass suicides. Around 8000 American troops, 60000 Japanese soldiers, and 150000 Japanese civilians died on Okinawa.

== Media information ==
=== DVD release ===
The series was released on Region 2 DVD by BBC Video as part of the BBC World War II DVD Collection.

=== Companion book ===
- Rees, Laurence (11 October 2001). Horror in the East: The Japanese at War 1931–1945. BBC Books. ISBN 978-0-563-53426-6.
