= Bastian Clevé =

German filmmaker and producer

- Born: 1 January 1950 (age 75); Munich, Germany
- Occupation(s): Filmmaker, Professor, Film producer, Author

Bastian Clevé (born 1 January 1950, in Munich), is a German filmmaker and producer. He is Professor and Head of the Film Production-Department at the Film Academy Baden-Wuerttemberg in Ludwigsburg, Germany.

== Biography ==
Clevé grew up in Hamburg. After a two-year stint as sound-assistant at the TV-studios in Munich he studied Visual Communication in Hamburg at the Hochschule für bildende Künste Hamburg (University of Fine Arts of Hamburg) where he continued filmmaking. In 1975/76 he was awarded a one-year scholarship by the German Academic Exchange Service DAAD to study at the San Francisco Art Institute. He was touring with his experimental short films throughout the continent. After a brief return to Germany he relocated to Los Angeles in 1979 where he worked as a freelance writer, director and producer.

In 1991 he returned to Germany to become Professor and Head of the Department for “Film Production and the Business of Entertainment” at the newly established Film Academy Baden-Wuerttemberg, in charge of the training program and the curriculum for motion-picture- and TV-producers. Clevé wrote and edited more than two dozens books on filmmaking and film production. He is married with a daughter.

== Work ==
Clevé started personal filmmaking in 1969 with short-films progressing into feature-lengths works. He sustained his efforts by winning awards and by touring and lecturing extensively throughout the world. Upon moving to Los Angeles he focused on the commercial side of filmmaking by picking up the craft of producing. He continued both his artistic and commercial filmmaking later on throughout his professorship in Germany.

His first DVD entitled Journeys contains Schau ins Land, Nachtwache, Lichtblick, Die Reise, Empor, Nach Bluff and Fatehpur Sikri.

== Filmography ==
The focus of Clevé‘s artistic filmmaking lies in the manipulation of real-live imagery using sophisticated in-camera-editing and optical printing.

=== Short films ===
- 1971 Pariser Traum / Rève Parisien
- 1974 Götterdämmerung
- 1975 Schau ins Land

Seelig
Nachtwache
Lichtblick

- 1977 Über den Flammenbaum

Die Reise
Empor
Nach Bluff

- 1978 Amerika: Neben anderem: Rodeo

Szenische Übersicht
Parade für die Unabhängigkeit
Am Wegerand

- 1979 Tollhaus
- 1980 Raga

Oscar
Sehen ist Glauben
Labyrinth
Fatehpur Sikri
East I
East II
Transit

- 1981 Puzzles

Zenith
Tollhaus II

- 1982 Der mystische Augenblick

Kaskaden
Echo

- 1983 Pool

Motion Picture
Descanso
Winterlandschaft

- 1986 Kyrie

=== Feature-length films ===
- 1978 San Francisco Zephyr

Der Deutschlandfahrer

- 1980 Exit Sunset Boulevard
- 1981 Holi
- 1983 Der Sheriff aus Altona
- 1986 Das blinde Glück
- 1988 Die Reise aus dem 23.Jahrhundert
- 1992 Winterreise im Jahre 1
- 2001 So weit die Füße tragen (a.k.a. As Far as My Feet Will Carry Me)
- 2005 Klang der Ewigkeit (a.k.a. Sound of Eternity)

=== Commercial filmmaking ===
Clevé‘s commercial filmmaking as a writer/director/producer has been for TV and as producer/production-manager/line-producer for German and American third party projects (Bagdad Café') or other contracted work. He has worked and produced throughout the world.

- Lumigraph
- Oskar Fischinger – Life and Work
- Die Familie Oppermann
- Melodie einer Stadt: Caracas
- Melodie einer Stadt: Bogota
- Melodie einer Stadt: São Paulo
- Melodie einer Stadt: Vancouver
- Melodie einer Stadt: Quebec City
- Die experimentellen Filme des Bastian Clevé
- Melodie einer Stadt: Buenos Aires
- Melodie einer Stadt: Rio de Janeiro
- Melodie einer Stadt: Mexiko
- Out of Rosenheim (a.k.a. Bagdad Café)
- Nightchildren
- Die verklärte Nacht

== Honors and awards (selection) ==
- Lichtblick BMI-Award 1976
- Empor German Film Award 1978
- Am Wegerand German Film Award 1979
- San Francisco Zephyr French Film-Critic's Award, Hyères Filmfestival 78
- Der Deutschlandfahrer BMI-Shortfilm-Award 1978
- Exit Sunset Boulevard BMI-Screenplay-Award 1978
- Das blinde Glück BMI-Screenplay-Award 1985
- Sound of Eternity HD Fest DEFFY-Award 2006

== Books (selection) ==
- 1989 The Art of Personal Filmmaking
- 1994 Film Production Management

Interview: Philipp Glass

- 1997 1.Akademiekreis Production Value

Development/Stoffentwicklung
Cashing In – Chancen und Risisken privater Filmfinanzierungsfonds
Wege zum Geld
Drehen in Deutschland – Shooting in Germany

- 1998 Investoren im Visier

Von der Idee zum Film

- 1999 Film Production Management
- 2005 Gib niemals auf – Filmökonomie in der Praxis
