= Laurence Rees =

English historian

- Born: 1957 (age 68–69)
- Education: University of Oxford
- Occupations: Author; filmmaker; historian

Laurence Rees (born 1957) is an English historian. He is a BAFTA winning historical documentary filmmaker and a British Book Award winning author of several books about Adolf Hitler, the Nazis and the atrocities committed, especially by them, during the 20th century. He is the former Head of BBC TV History Programmes.

== Biography ==
Laurence Rees was educated at Solihull School and the University of Oxford. He joined BBC TV in 1978 as a research trainee and subsequently worked as a researcher and assistant producer in factual television between 1978 and 1983. He always wanted to make history documentaries and made his first film as a director and producer at the age of 25 in 1983 – a film portrait of Noël Coward for BBC1.

He started specializing in history films that related to the Nazis and the Second World War with his controversial programme A British Betrayal in 1991, followed by Goebbels - Master of Propaganda in 1992.

Rees was appointed editor of Timewatch, the BBC's historical documentary series, in 1992 and over the next 10 years commissioned and editorially oversaw more than a hundred different history films. In 1994 he was also the founder editor of the BBC's biographical TV strand, Reputations. He was subsequently appointed Head of BBC History and Creative Director, BBC History.

Unusually for a senior executive at BBC Television, Rees carried on writing and producing his own programmes alongside his executive producer responsibilities. The series he himself wrote and produced (and also directed the great majority of the films) during this time include the BBC television series Nazis: a Warning from History (1997), War of the Century (1999), Horror in the East (2001), Auschwitz, the Nazis and the 'Final Solution' (2005) and World War Two: Behind Closed Doors (2008). He also writes history books and wrote books to accompany each of these series. His book on Auschwitz is the world's best-selling history of the camp.

Rees left the BBC in 2008 and created the multimedia educational Website WW2History.com in 2009. The website subsequently won "Best in Class"' awards in both the education and reference categories at the Interactive Media Awards.

Through his own independent production company, LR History, Rees has also written, produced and directed the 2012 BBC television series The Dark Charisma of Adolf Hitler (and wrote the accompanying book) and the 90-minute feature-length documentary Touched by Auschwitz (BBC2 2015).

He has won many awards for his work. In 2006 he won the British Book Award for history book of the year for "Auschwitz: the Nazis and the Final Solution". His television awards include a BAFTA, a Grierson Award, a Broadcasting Press Guild Award, a BANFF festival award, a Broadcast Award, a George Foster Peabody Award, two International Documentary Awards and two Emmys. In New York City in 2009 he received the 'Lifetime Achievement Award' from 'History Makers', the worldwide congress of Historical and Current Affairs programme makers.

In 2009 he was appointed a senior visiting fellow in the International History Department at the London School of Economics and Political Science, London University. He was awarded an honorary doctorate for services to history by the University of Sheffield in 2005, and an honorary doctorate from the Open University for services to Arts and Sciences in 2011.

Clive James, in Revolt of the Pendulum, said that Rees was "currently producing the best documentaries ever made about the Nazi era". Antony Beevor, in a book review in the Daily Telegraph, wrote that "Laurence Rees has done more for good history on television in this country than anyone else."

Daniel Snowman, in his profile of Rees in Historians, wrote that "Rees has created a body of work that is carefully structured and impeccably researched, incorporating vivid archive material from a wide array of sources. Most remarkable, perhaps, are the interviews he has filmed. Rees is one of the few people – perhaps the only one - who has met and interviewed at length not only hundreds of people who suffered from the barbarities of World War II right across the globe but also, crucially, many of the perpetrators. All this has given Rees a comparative, cross-cultural perspective on the horrors of the war that no academic could match."

Rees's history of the Holocaust, The Holocaust: A New History, was published by PublicAffairs in January 2017 and by Viking in the UK. It was a Sunday Times bestseller.

His most recent book The Nazi Mind: 12 Warnings from History was published by Viking, an imprint of Penguin Random House, in the UK in January 2025.

== Filmography ==
- 2015 Touched by Auschwitz – 90-minute feature length Documentary for BBC2 – writer/producer/director
- 2012 The Dark Charisma of Adolf Hitler – 3 part series for BBC2: writer/producer/director
- 2008 World War II Behind Closed Doors: Stalin, the Nazis and the West 6 part series for BBC2: writer/producer/documentary director
- 2005 Hitler's Place in History – executive producer
- 2005 Auschwitz: The Nazis and 'The Final Solution' – 6 part series for BBC2: writer/producer
- 2003 Colosseum: Rome's Arena of Death – co-executive producer
- 2002 The Great Pyramid – executive producer
- 2002 Christmas Under Fire – executive producer
- 2002 The Ship (TV series) – executive producer
- 2001 Horror in the East – 2 part series for BBC2: writer/producer/director
- 2000 Conquistadors (TV series) – executive producer
- 1999 War of the Century – 4 part series for BBC2: writer/producer/director
- 1998 In the Footsteps of Alexander the Great – executive producer
- 1997 Tales from the Tomb: Lost Sons of the Pharaohs – executive producer
- 1997 The Nazis: A Warning from History – 6 part series for BBC2: writer/producer/director
- 1995 Crusades (BBC TV series) – executive producer
- 1994-1995 Reputations. Founder Editor and Executive Producer
- 1993–2002, Timewatch Commissioning Editor and Executive Producer.
- 1992 We Have Ways of Making You Think – (including Goebbels:Master of Propaganda) writer/producer/director
- 1991 British Betrayal, for BBC2: writer/producer/director
- 1987 Crisis – drama documentary for BBC1, writer/producer/director
- 1983 Noël Coward: A Private Life, for BBC1: producer/director

== Bibliography ==
- The Nazi Mind: 12 Warnings from History. Viking Press. 2025. ISBN 978-0241740811.
- Hitler and Stalin: The Tyrants of the Second World War. Public Affairs. 2020, ISBN 978-1-61039-964-7
- The Holocaust: A New History. Viking Press. 2017. ISBN 978-1610398442.
- The Dark Charisma of Adolf Hitler: Leading Millions into the Abyss. Ebury Press. 2012. ISBN 978-0091917630.
- World War II Behind Closed Doors: Stalin, the Nazis and the West. Pantheon. 2009. ISBN 978-0-307-37730-2.
- Their Darkest Hour: People Tested to the Extreme in WWII. Ebury Press. 2007. ISBN 978-0-09-191757-9.
- Auschwitz: The Nazis and the 'Final Solution'. BBC Books. 2005. ISBN 978-0-563-52296-6.
- Horror in the East: The Japanese at War 1931–1945. BBC Books. 2001. ISBN 978-0-563-53426-6.
- Rees, Laurence (1999). The War of the Century: When Hitler Fought Stalin. BBC Books. ISBN 978-0-563-38477-9.
- The Nazis: A Warning from History. BBC Books. 1997. ISBN 978-0-563-38704-6.
