= Their Darkest Hour =

Their Darkest Hour: People Tested to the Extreme in WWII
- Author: Laurence Rees
- Genre: history
- Publisher: Ebury Press
- Publication date: 2008
- Publication place: UK
- Media type: paperback
- ISBN: 978-0-09-191759-3
- OCLC: 213381935

Their Darkest Hour: People Tested to the Extreme in WWII, is a book written by Laurence Rees. Using interviews that Rees had conducted throughout his career, he explores the stories of 35 soldiers and civilians involved in the second world war, with a particular focus on the victims and perpetrators of war crimes during the conflict.
