= The Somme – From Defeat to Victory =

2006 BBC documentary film

- BBC DVD Cover
- Written by: Detlef Siebert
- Directed by: Detlef Siebert
- Starring: Iain McKee; Wolf Kahler; Benedict Sandiford; Erich Redman
- Narrated by: Alisdair Simpson
- Theme music composer: Alasdair Reid
- Country of origin: United Kingdom
- Original language: English

Production
- Producers: Matthew Barrett; David Higginson; Detlef Siebert
- Running time: 58 min

Original release
- Release: 2 July 2006

The Somme – From Defeat to Victory is a 2006 BBC documentary film made to commemorate the 90th anniversary of the Battle of the Somme.

== Production ==
The film was produced in conjunction with the Open University and was intended to go beyond the standard histories that end with the British defeat at the end of the first day to demonstrate how the British learnt from their failures and developed radical new tactics that would help the allies to win the war. The film mixes dramatic re-enactments and archive footage augmented by readings from the diaries, letters and reports of the men involved.

== Plot ==
The 16th (Service) Battalion (2nd Salford), Lancashire Fusiliers was one of the Pals battalions that had been created to allow friends and colleagues to fight together. On 21 June 1916, Cpl. Stephen Sharples quells the fears of Pte. Walter Fiddes and best friend L/Cpl. Thomas Mellor that the war would be over before they could see action with the announcement that their battalion would soon take part in the big push. The three men were among the volunteers that had joined up in 1914 in response to Lord Kitchener's call to make up the bulk of the British Army. Concurrent to the German attack on Verdun, an Anglo-French offensive is to be launched at the River Somme. German divisional commander Gen. Baron Franz von Soden relies on the experience of veterans such as Cpl. Friedrich Hinkel against the biggest British military deployment in the war thus far. The British go over-the-top at 7.30 a.m. on 1 July expecting little resistance after a 7 day artillery bombardment of enemy positions, but are met by machine-gun fire within minutes.

Cpl. Hinkel faces the 36th (Ulster) Division, which is quickly forced into retreat while 500 yards (460 m) away Capt. Thomas Tweed leads the 2nd Salford Pals' B-Company in an attack on the Thiepval Plateau that sees the death of Mellor. The Ulster division regroup to take the stronghold of the Schwaben Redoubt and Maj-Gen. Sir Edward Percival recommends committing the reserves to secure the position and take Thiepval from the north but corps commander Lt.-Gen. Sir Thomas Morland rejects the new plan. With two-thirds of his company dead or wounded Tweed takes refuge for two hours behind a bank in no-man's land. Sharples disappears attempting to capture the enemy machine gun nest and Fiddis is wounded taking a message to battalion requesting withdrawal. Moorland, some 3 miles (4.8 km) from the front, follows the failure of the first and second attacks on Thiepval by sticking to the battle plan and ordering a third. The more adaptive German commanders retake the Redoubt rescuing Hinkel's position and forcing the Ulstermen into a bloody retreat.

The bloodiest day in British military history ends with 19,240 dead and 37,000 wounded, devastating communities like Salford but this was just the beginning of a battle that would last for four months. The British learn from their failures and over the following month they make steady gains along the front, by removing inflexible commanders like Morland and delegating to officers on the spot such as Brig-Gen. Herbert Shoubridge, who commands the 26 September attack on Thiepval spearheaded by Lt-Col. Frank Maxwell V.C. The artillery fires the new creeping barrage with the 12th Battalion, Middlesex Regiment following immediately behind, easily to overrun the first German trenches but failing to keep up; Maxwell's men comes under fire from Infantry Regiment 180. A slaughter is averted when British tanks arrive, forcing the terrified Germans into retreat only to be ditched and disabled a short time later.

Soden is distracted by an official visit from the Kaiser's adjutant Gen. Hans von Plessen and when communication lines are cut he is rendered helpless. Meanwhile, the British Generals are kept up to date by reports from artillery observers and air reconnaissance, allowing them to order re-bombardment of German-held positions. Maxwell moves forward with his men to set up a command post at the Thiepval Chateau from where he controls the attack. With the infantry rapidly running out of officers it is left to the initiative of men from the ranks like Pvt. Frederick Edwards to secure a British victory. Plessen waits for six hours at Soden's HQ for news of the attack, by which time it is too late to order a counterattack and Thiepval is lost. The victory allows the British to secure all their objectives from 1 July and the French at Verdun are able to launch a counter-attack to push back the Germans. Thiepval is the site of the Thiepval Memorial to the Missing of the Somme commemorating the 70,000 of the 432,000 British casualties with no known grave including Sharples, Mellor and Fiddes.

== Cast ==
- Iain McKee as Fiddes
- Chris Hannon as Mellor
- Peter Barich as Sharples
- Rüdiger Kuhlbrodt as General von Soden
- Steffan Boje as Hinkel
- Mike Rogers as Captain Tweed
- Crispin Redman as Lt-Col. Maxwell
- Eric Carte as Lt-Gen. Morland
- Martin Turner as Lt-Gen. Percival
- John Vine as Brig-Gen. Shoubridge
- Wolf Kahler as General Hans von Plessen
- Adam Webb as Edwards
- John Shortell as Stammler
- Georg Alfred Wittner as Captain Fischer
- Peter Stark as Knaupp
- Benedict Sandiford as Captain Johnston
- Erich Redman as Hässler
- Christopher Nabb as Routledge
- Ben Goddard as Lt. Walton
- Thorston Manderlay as Schmitt
- Darren Black as Maxwell's ADC

== Media information ==
The film was released on Region 2 DVD by BBC Video on 3 July 2006.
