= War of the Century =

BBC documentary film series

- DVD cover
- Written by: Laurence Rees
- Narrated by: Samuel West
- Country of origin: United Kingdom
- Original language: English
- No. of series: 1
- No. of episodes: 4

Production
- Producer: Laurence Rees
- Running time: 200 min

Original release
- Network: BBC Two
- Release: 5 October – 26 October 1999

War of the Century: When Hitler Fought Stalin, is a BBC documentary film series that examines Adolf Hitler's invasion of the Soviet Union in 1941 and the no-holds-barred war on both sides. It not only examines the war but also the terror inside the Soviet Union at the time due to the paranoia of Joseph Stalin—the revenge atrocities, the Great Purge of army officers, the near-lunatic orders, and the paranoia of being upstaged by others, especially Marshal Zhukov. The historical adviser is Ian Kershaw.

== Media information ==
=== DVD release ===
The film was released on Region 2 DVD by BBC Video as part of the BBC World War II DVD Collection.

=== Companion book ===
- Rees, Laurence (30 September 1999). War of the Century: When Hitler Fought Stalin. BBC Books. ISBN 978-0-563-38477-9.
