= Black Arts/West (Seattle) =

Black Arts/West was a nationally known African American theater founded in 1969 in Seattle, Washington, by playwright Douglas Q. Barnett. Barnett's New Group Theater started in 1961. Black Arts/West formally began as a performing arts program in 1967 with the social services agency CAMP (Central Area Motivation Program). The theater established an office in a theatrical space in 1969. In 1973 they transitioned from being a community theater company to a professional theatrical ensemble, and received funding from sources such as the National Endowment for the Arts and the Washington State and Seattle Arts Commission. It hosted over 32 plays and other performances before its closure in 1980. In 2020, the location of the theater on East Union Street between 34th and 35th avenues was named in honor of Douglas Q. Barnett.

== Notable productions ==
- Ed Bullins, A Son, Come Home directed by Beatrice Winde (1969)
- Amiri Baraka (then LeRoi Jones), Dutchman directed by Douglas Q. Barnett (1969)
- Alice Childress, Wine In the Wilderness directed by Ana V. Thorne(1970)
- Derek Walcott, Dream on Monkey Mountain directed by Jason Bernard (1971)
- Melvin Van Peebles, Ain't Supposed To Die A Natural Death (1971) directed by Gilbert Moses
