= Auschwitz: The Nazis and 'The Final Solution' =

2005 British documentary series

- BBC DVD cover
- Genre: Documentary
- Written by: Doris Bergen; Megan Callaway; David Orenstein; Laurence Rees
- Directed by: Laurence Rees; Catherine Tatge
- Starring: Linda Ellerbee; Horst-Günter Marx; Klaus Mikoleit
- Narrated by: Samuel West (UK); Linda Hunt (U.S.)
- Country of origin: United Kingdom
- Original language: English
- No. of episodes: 6

Production
- Producer: Mary Mazur
- Editors: Alan Lygo; Douglas Varchool
- Camera setup: Laurie Conlon
- Running time: 48 minutes

Original release
- Network: BBC Two
- Release: 11 January – 15 February 2005

Auschwitz: The Nazis and 'The Final Solution' is a six-episode BBC documentary film series presenting the story of the Auschwitz concentration camp from its early operations in 1940 to the prosecution of German Nazis involved in the operation of the camp. It combines interviews with former inmates and guards with authentic reenactments of relevant events. It was first televised on BBC Two on 11 January 2005. In the United States, this series first aired on PBS television stations as Auschwitz: Inside the Nazi State in early 2005 and was released, under that title, in a two-DVD box set (Region 1) by BBC Warner on 29 March 2005.

== Production ==
The series uses four principal elements: rarely seen contemporary colour and monochrome film from archives, interviews with survivors such as Dario Gabbai and former German Nazis such as Oskar Gröning, computer-generated reconstructions of long-demolished buildings and detailed, historically accurate reenactments of meetings and other events. These are linked by modern footage of locations in and around the site of the Auschwitz German camp.

Laurence Rees stressed that the reenactments are not dramatisations but are exclusively based on documented sources:

There is no screenwriter… Every single word that is spoken is double – and in some cases triple – sourced from historical records.

This reflects the conception of the earlier BBC/HBO film Conspiracy, which similarly recreates the Wannsee Conference (an event briefly portrayed in Episode 2 of the series) based on a copy of the minutes kept by one of the attendees, although that film also includes speculative dramatised sections.

The computer-generated reconstructions use architectural plans that only became available in the 1990s when the archives of the former Soviet Union became accessible to Western historians. The discovery of these plans is described in the 1994 BBC Horizon documentary Auschwitz: The Blueprints of Genocide.

The start of the second movement of Johannes Brahms' A German Requiem, to Words of the Holy Scriptures, Op. 45 (German: Ein deutsches Requiem, nach Worten der heiligen Schrift) "Denn alles Fleisch, es ist wie Gras" ("For all flesh, is as grass"), is used in the opening credits of the BBC documentary film series The Nazis: A Warning from History, with various sections of this part of the movement being used for the closing credits.

- Main theme: Keyboard suite in D minor (HWV 437), composed by George Frideric Handel, for the DVD menu and end credits.
- Symphony No. 3, composed by Polish composer Henryk Górecki
- Fratres and Spiegel im Spiegel, both composed by Estonian composer Arvo Pärt
- Piano Trio No. 2, composed by Schubert.
- The Twins (Prague), Embers and Europe, composed by Max Richter.

The last episode of the series also features Introitus from Mozart's Requiem in D minor, which is played just before the ending credits.

== Episodes ==
Episode number	Title	Original UK broadcast
1.	Surprising Beginnings	11 January 2005
2.	Orders & Initiatives	18 January 2005
3.	Factories of Death	25 January 2005
4.	Corruption	1 February 2005
5.	Frenzied Killing	8 February 2005
6.	Liberation & Revenge	15 February 2005

== Media information ==
=== DVD ===
- Released on Region 2 DVD by BBC Video on 2005-02-14.
- Also included in the BBC History of World War II DVD collection.
- Released on Region 1 DVD (two-DVD box set) by BBC Warner on 29 March 2005, also distributed by PBS Video in the U.S.

=== Streaming ===
The series has appeared in streaming form through Netflix and BBC Select in North America.

=== Companion books ===
- Rees, Laurence (6 January 2005). Auschwitz: The Nazis and the 'Final Solution'. BBC Books. ISBN 978-0-563-52296-6.
- Rees, Laurence (4 January 2005). Auschwitz: A New History. Public Affairs Books. ISBN 978-1-58648-303-6.
