= Susan Ertz =

British writer (1887–1985)

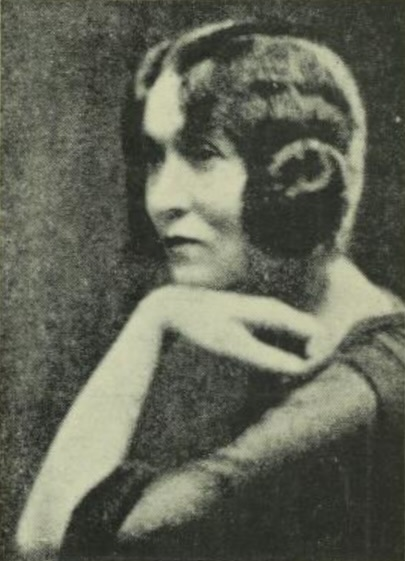
Susan Ertz in 1925

First edition (1933), D. Appleton-Century

Susan Ertz (13 February 1887 – 11 April 1985) was an Anglo-American writer, known for her "sentimental tales of genteel life in the country." She was born in Walton-on-Thames, Surrey, England to American parents Charles and Mary Ertz. She moved back and forth between both countries during her childhood but chose to live in England when she was 18. She married British Army soldier, Major John Ronald McCrindle in London in 1932.

A common theme running through her work involves a female character "who is thrust out on her own from a sheltered environment into a vaguely hostile external world with which she is initially unprepared to cope. Her coming to terms with this hostile world provides the fictional interest of [her] novels." The Proselyte, the story of a London woman who marries a Mormon missionary and moves with him to Utah, was one of her most highly praised books (even Mormons felt that in "her story the hardships and sorrows of the people are clearly portrayed"). Ertz's Woman Alive is a science fiction novel set after all women other than the titular heroine have perished in a plague.

One of her later works, In the Cool of the Day, was the source of an eponymous movie in 1963, starring Jane Fonda, Peter Finch, and Angela Lansbury.

== Works ==
- Madame Claire 1923 (selected as one of the first ten Penguin Books paperbacks in 1935)
- Nina 1924
- After Noon 1926
- The Wind of Complication (short stories) 1927 (published in the U.K. as And Then Face to Face)
- Now East, Now West 1927
- The Milky Way 1929 (under the name, The Galaxy, this book was on the U.S. best seller fiction list for 1929.)
- The Story of Julian 1931 (later editions entitled Julian Probert)
- The Proselyte 1933
- Now We Set Out 1935
- Woman Alive, But Now Dead 1935 also published as Woman Alive
- No Hearts to Break 1937
- Black, White and Caroline 1938
- Big Frogs and Little Frogs (short stories) 1939
- One Fight More 1939
- Anger in the Sky 1943
- Mary Hellam 1947 (published in the U.K. as Two Names Upon the Shore)
- The Prodigal Heart 1950
- The Undefended Gate 1953 (published in the U.S. as Invitation to Folly)
- Charmed Circle 1956
- In the Cool of the Day 1960
- Summer's Lease 1972 (published in the U.K. as Devices and Desires)
- The Philosopher's Daughter 1976
