= The Nazis: A Warning from History =

1997 BBC documentary film series

- 2004 UK DVD cover
- Genre: Documentary
- Written by: Laurence Rees
- Directed by: Laurence Rees; Tilman Remme
- Narrated by: Samuel West
- Theme music composer: Johannes Brahms
- Opening theme: "Denn alles Fleisch es ist wie Gras", the second movement of A German Requiem
- Country of origin: United Kingdom
- Original languages: English; German; Polish; Lithuanian
- No. of series: 1
- No. of episodes: 6

Production
- Producer: Laurence Rees
- Cinematography: Martin Patmore
- Editors: James Hay; Alan Lygo; Mark Summers
- Running time: Approx 50 mins.
- Production company: BBC

Original release
- Network: BBC Two
- Release: 10 September – 15 October 1997

The Nazis: A Warning from History is a 1997 BBC documentary film series that examines Adolf Hitler and the Nazis' rise to power in Germany, their zenith, their decline and fall, and the consequences of their reign. It featured archive footage and interviews with eyewitnesses and was shown in six episodes.

In the United States, the series premiered on the A&E Networks owned by The History Channel, and was aired from 8 February until 12 February 1998.

A near-concurrently released companion book accompanied the documentary series in both the UK and US.

== Production ==
The series was written and produced by Laurence Rees. The historical and script consultant was Prof. Sir Ian Kershaw, who also appears briefly in the "Chaos and Consent" episode. The series was narrated by actor Samuel West. The music used over the opening credits is "Denn alles Fleisch es ist wie Gras", the second movement of Brahms' A German Requiem.

== Acclaim ==
The documentary earned the BBC and producer Reese a 1997 Peabody Award, its jurors calling it a "superbly documented six-part series, The Nazis: A Warning from History is a chillingly thorough account of the Third Reich’s rise and fall." The Peabody Award was a year later followed by two others; an IDA (International Documentary Association) Award in the "Limited Series" category, and a BAFTA Award in the category "Best Factual Series".

The Nazis: A Warning from History ranked 93rd in a list of the 100 Greatest British Television Programmes drawn up by the British Film Institute in 2000 based on votes by industry professionals.

== Home video formats ==
The documentary was for home viewing first released in the UK as a two-tape VHS set on 2 February 1998 by BBC Worldwide Ltd. (UPC 5014503626327), which was only six years later followed by a UK two-disc DVD set release on 24 May 2004 (UPC 5014503142728).

In North American the first home video release was the 26 October 1999 VHS The Nazis- The Acclaimed BBC Documentary six-tape box set from A&E Home Video (ISBN 0767008871), the History Channel's regular home video format publisher which had been licensed to air the series internationally, including the UK for its reruns. This was followed by the 18 July 2006 four-disc DVD set (ISBN 1419809032) from BBC Home Entertainment for which the BBC commissioned Time-Life (whose book division had actually already released the precursory The Third Reich book series that dealt with the same subject matter) for the retail distribution and promotional services, which included at least one television commercial. An American reissue has followed suit on 25 August 2015 (UPC 883929514649).

Spain saw the "Nazis: un aviso de la historia" two-disc DVD set release by Divisa Red, S.A.U. in May 2005 (UPC 8421394520660), which the company reissued on 29 October 2008 (UPC 8421394527874). A three-disc Benelux DVD version was released twice in 2006 by Just Entertainment (UPC 8717344720762, 8717344725965), while France had its two-disc set released by Koba Films on 4 June 2014 as "Nazis, un avertissement de l'histoire" (UPC 5051889476009). The documentary had not seen a home video format in Germany itself, though the companion book was published in translation, which it had not been in the other European countries, the UK excepted.

The UK and Benelux DVD sets all featured a band mentioning "Best Factual Series", the category which had earned the documentary its 1998 BAFTA Award, whereas the French release had the fact mentioned on the back cover of the set. Neither Spanish release had the fact mentioned though.

== Companion book ==
- Rees, Laurence (1997). The Nazis: A Warning from History (original UK hardback ed.). London: BBC Books. p. 256. ISBN 0563387041.
- Rees, Laurence (11 September 1997). The Nazis: A Warning from History (original US hardback ed.). New York City: MJF Books. p. 256. ISBN 1567319130.
- Rees, Laurence; Ströle (tr.), Wolfram; Dierlamm (tr.), Helmut (1997). Die Nazis: Eine Warnung der Geschichte (German-language paperback ed.). Munich: Diana Verlag. p. 296. ISBN 3828450040.
- Rees, Laurence (15 April 1998). The Nazis: A Warning from History (2nd US hardback ed.). New York City: The New Press. p. 256. ISBN 1565844459.
- Rees, Laurence (1 April 1999). The Nazis: A Warning from History (3rd US hardback ed.). New York City: The New Press. p. 256. ISBN 156584551X.
- Rees, Laurence; Ströle (tr.), Wolfram; Dierlamm (tr.), Helmut (1 January 2001). Die Nazis: Eine Warnung der Geschichte (2nd German-language paperback ed.). Munich: Heyne Verlag. p. 320. ISBN 345318095X.
- Rees, Laurence (2 March 2006). The Nazis: A Warning from History (revised UK paperback ed.). London: BBC Books & Penguin Books (releases under both imprints). p. 424. ISBN 056349333X.
- Rees, Laurence (31 August 2012). The Nazis: A Warning from History (eBook ed.). London: BBC Digital & Penguin Digital (releases under both imprints). p. 256. ISBN 9781448140541.
- Rees, Laurence (1 April 2020). The Nazis: A Warning from History (Chinese-language hardback ed.). Nanjing: Yilin Press. p. 328. ISBN 9787544781114.
- Rees, Laurence (30 July 2020). The Nazis: A Warning from History (Audio book ed.). London: Penguin Audio. ISBN 9781473532533.

== Episodes ==
No.	Title	Original release date
1	"Helped into Power"	10 September 1997
How the Nazi party was formed and Adolf Hitler was able to rise to power. Interviewees include former Nazi party members and their opponents.
2	"Chaos and Consent"	17 September 1997
Examines how the Nazis consolidated power and how extreme and radical policies were formed and implemented, using the example of the euthanasia policy of Philipp Bouhler. The help given to the Gestapo by ordinary citizens is also explored and other events covered include Kristallnacht and remilitarisation. Interviewees include former Nazi officials, an army officer, a Jewish man and an inmate of an early concentration camp.
3	"The Wrong War"	24 September 1997
Traces the path to war with Great Britain and the alliance with the Soviet Union. Interviewees include former Nazi officials and diplomats.
4	"The Wild East"	1 October 1997
Examines Nazi rule and 'ethnic cleansing' in occupied Poland under Hans Frank, Albert Forster and Arthur Greiser. Interviewees include a Polish man who was subject to 'Germanisation', an ethnic German who was resettled in Poland and a former Nazi official.
5	"The Road to Treblinka"	8 October 1997
An account of mass killings in occupied territories after the invasion of the Soviet Union. Interviewees include a former member of an execution squad and a survivor of Treblinka extermination camp.
6	"Fighting to the End"	15 October 1997
Explores why Germany fought on when military defeat was inevitable. Interviewees include German soldiers and civilians.
