= Eldridge Industries =

US investment firm

Eldridge Industries, LLC
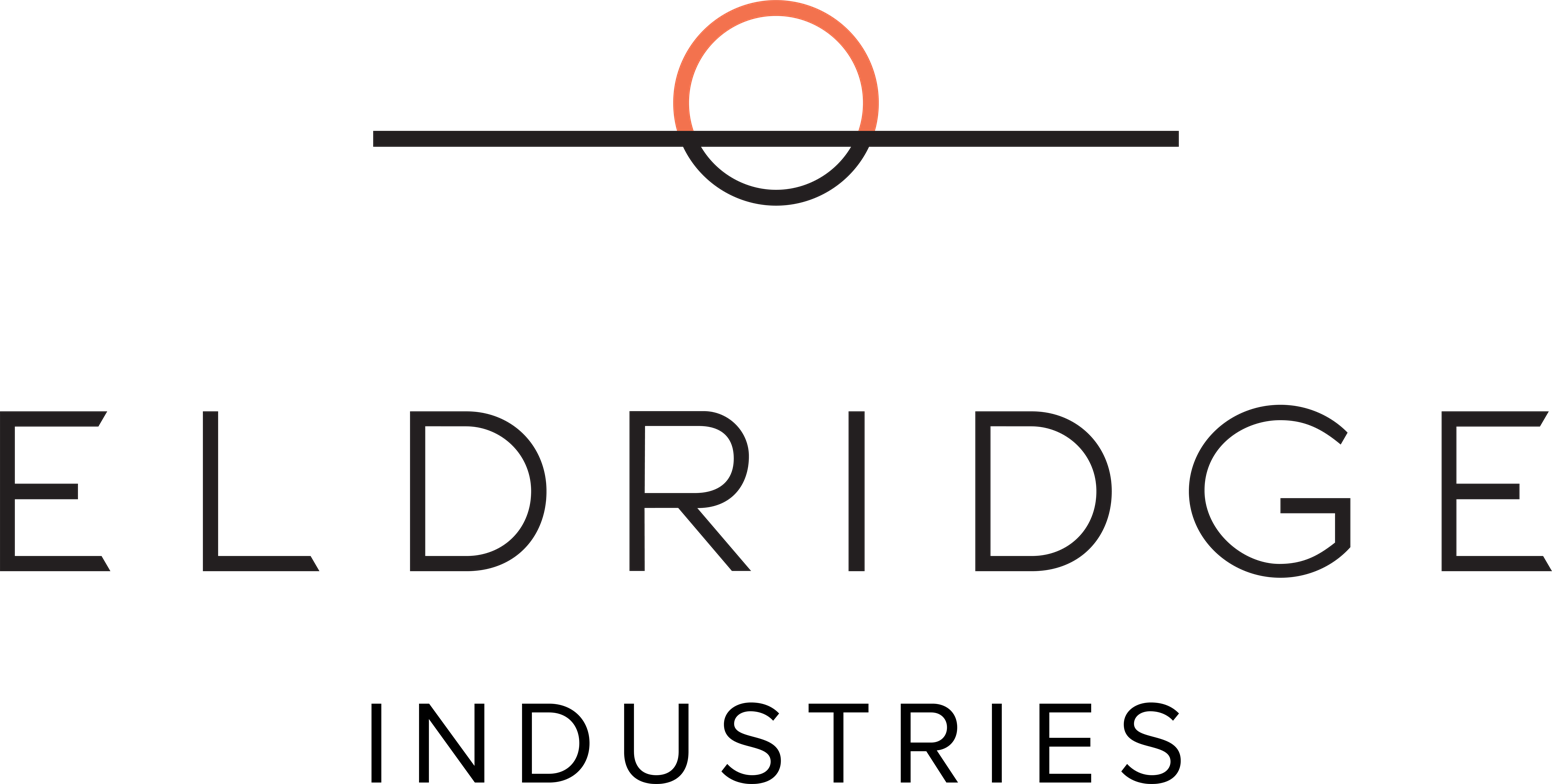
- Type: Private
- Founded: 2015; 11 years ago
- Headquarters: Miami, Florida, U.S.
- Owner: Todd Boehly
- Number of employees: 5,000 (2026)
- Subsidiaries: Eldridge; Penske Media Eldridge (JV)
- Website: eldridgeind.com

Eldridge Industries, LLC is an American holding company headquartered in Miami. The company was founded by CEO and chairman Todd Boehly. It invests in industries such as insurance, asset management, technology, sports, media, real estate, and the consumer sector.

== History ==
Eldridge Industries was formed in 2015 by CEO and Chairman Todd Boehly, President Anthony D. Minella, and General counsel Duncan Bagshaw, after Boehly purchased Dick Clark Productions, Billboard and The Hollywood Reporter, and Mediabistro from Guggenheim Partners. He named the company after the historic Eldridge Hotel, where he stayed while negotiating the acquisition of Security Benefit Life Insurance for Guggenheim. Headquartered in Miami, the company has offices in the United States, the United Kingdom, Singapore, India, and the United Arab Emirates. The company has roughly 5,000 employees.

In 2020, Eldridge Industries provided financing to Ark Invest, allowing ARK founder Cathie Wood to remain majority shareholder of the company.

In 2021, the College of William & Mary announced that it had partnered with the company to develop a series of courses related to fiscal policy at the Mason School of Business.

It has a majority ownership stake in investment manager Maranon Capital. In 2021, some of Eldridge Industries' credit management operations spun out to create Panagram Structured Asset Management. Panagram launched two collateralized loan obligations (CLOs) exchange-traded funds in 2023. Eldridge Industries owned CBAM Partners, an SEC-registered investment advisor, before selling it to the Carlyle Group for $787 million in 2022.

In 2023, the company became a founding member of the Allbright Alliance, a collective initiative to increase opportunities for women in the workforce.

Eldridge Industries partnered with AECOM to create the real estate investment firm Eldridge Acre Partners. The firm launched in 2024 with $1 billion in assets, and Eldridge Industries as the majority owner.

Eldridge Industries owns a stake in Flexjet; in 2025, L Catterton led an $800 million investment to acquire 20% of Flexjet.

Eldridge Industries has backed hospitality group Aurify Brands since it was founded in 2011. It invested in international bakery-restaurant chain Le Pain Quotidien through Aurify in March 2021. In 2023, Convive Brands was formed to operate Le Pain Quotidien, Little Beet and Little Beet Table, which had been previously operated by Aurify. Eldridge Industries has also invested in pizza restaurant chain Chuck E. Cheese.

Thirteenth Floor Entertainment Group, an operator of horror-themed entertainment venues and escape rooms, is partially owned by the company. Eldridge Industries was part of a group of creditors who invested $1.2 billion in Canadian company Cirque du Soleil in 2020.

Eldridge Industries invested in virtual reality entertainment company Illuminarium Experiences, as part of a $100 million investment. The company led a $3.4 million funding round for food delivery marketplace Sesame in December 2021. Eldridge Industries has also invested in agricultural and industrial chemical producer LSB Industries, recycling technology company Protein Evolution, Inc., and G-Form, producer of Smart-Flex athletic gear.

== Eldridge ==
In 2025, the company launched Eldridge, a new asset manager and insurance holding company with over $70 billion in assets under management. It is wholly owned by Eldridge Industries and includes two divisions, Eldridge Capital Management and Eldridge Wealth Solutions. Eldridge Wealth Solutions comprises Everly Life and Security Benefit Life Insurance, an insurer with $60 billion in assets. It had a net income of $1.2 billion in 2023, and issued an offering of $650 million in senior debt in 2024. Several existing Eldridge Industries businesses were reconsolidated under Eldridge.

In 2025, Eldridge opened an office in Singapore. It sold its first $504.25 million collateralized loan obligation that year.

== Insurance and asset management ==
Eldridge Industries owns Zinnia (formerly SE2), an end-to-end insurance software provider based in Topeka, Kansas. The company develops a platform of administrative and distribution tools and digital ledger technology used in insurance. Zinnia acquired Breathe Life, a SaaS insurance platform, in 2022 and acquired online insurance marketplace Policygenius in 2023, and technology company Ebix in 2024. Zinnia raised $300 million in strategic financing from Vista Credit Partners in 2024. In March 2025, Gary Cohn joined Zinnia's board of directors.

In 2021, the company participated in a $60 million investment in financial services company Buckle. The company invested in DPL Financial Partners in January 2021 and September 2022. In 2022, the company had over $1 billion in annuity sales, this doubled to $2 billion in 2023.

That year, Eldridge Industries invested in PPRO Financial and Clearcover Insurance. Hudson Structured Capital Management refinanced in 2021, with Eldridge Industries as its principal backer.

In 2024, it was announced that the company was acquiring a 10% interest in Blue Owl GP Stakes Fund III. Eldridge Industries partnered with Raymond James Financial that same year. In 2025, the company partnered with Fifth Third Bancorp to expand their private credit offerings.

== Sports ==
In 2017, the company led a round of funding estimated at over $100 million for DraftKings, a daily fantasy sports contest provider. DraftKings purchased a stake in Vivid from Eldridge Industries, when the company went public in 2021. Eldridge Industries also has a stake in the Los Angeles Dodgers; Chavez Ravine, the acreage around Dodger Stadium; Cloud9; and Fanatics, Inc..

== Technology ==
The company has invested in fintech companies PayActiv, Stash and Truebill. In 2021, Stash reached a value of over $1.4 billion, and Truebill was acquired by Rocket Companies in 2021.

In 2020, the company acquired data technology company Seek, formerly known as Knoema. In 2021, Eldridge Industries participated in multiple funding rounds for digital delivery service Gopuff, including the company's $1.1 billion financing round, and a $475 million financing round for artificial intelligence company Dataminr. The company invested in AI security company Oosto (formerly AnyVision) in 2018 and 2021.

Eldridge Industries has invested in technology companies Cutover, Digital Asset, Netomi, Cloudframe, e-commerce platform Samcart, materials science company Recover, Bilt Rewards, CoreWeave, and Capital Integration Systems (CAIS), a software as a service (SaaS) platform launched in 2023.

It has invested in The Ready Games and mobile game developer Tripledot Studios. In 2025, Tripledot Studios acquired AppLovin's portfolio of mobile game studios in 2025 for $800 million, as part of its expansion across North America, Europe and Asia. Eldridge Industries held a stake in Epic Games which was sold back to Epic in 2021.

Eldridge Industries invested in neurotechnology company Kernel, digital health platform Wellthy, biotechnology company Quantum-Si, and fertility services company Kindbody, which was ranked #30 on the Deloitte Technology Fast 500 in 2023.

In 2022, the company led a $210 million investment round for Canadian financial technology company Koho. As of 2023, Koho reached an $800 million valuation and had over 1 million users. Eldridge Industries has led investment rounds for Digital Currency Group, Cross River Bank, which was valued at $3 billion in March 2022, and an investment round for insurance technology company Accelerant, which reached a $2.4 billion valuation in 2023. Accelerant expanded its operations to Canada with the acquisition of Omega Insurance in 2023.

In 2022, the company led a $400 million investment round for Velocity Global and took a seat on its board of directors.

Eldridge Industries also invested in Metropolis Technologies, an AI parking management company, leading a $1.7 billion funding round Metropolis' $1.5 billion acquisition of SP Plus Corporation in 2024, which took SP Plus private.

== Real estate ==
Eldridge Industries co-owns Cain, a London-headquartered real estate firm with an estimated $17 billion in assets under management. Cain owns The Beverly Hilton in Los Angeles, 830 Brickell, which was completed in 2024, Missoni Baia, the Una Residences in Miami, and the Delano South Beach, which is under renovation as part of a joint venture with Accor. Cain also invested in hospitality group Aman Group, and is developing One Beverly Hills, a mixed-use site that includes the Beverly Hilton, the Waldorf-Astoria Beverly Hills, and an Aman Hotel, Residences & Club which broke ground in 2024. In 2025, Eldridge Industries and Cain received $300 million in financing from Vici Properties to develop One Beverly Hills. The property is scheduled for completion in 2027, ahead of the 2028 Summer Olympics in Los Angeles.

In 2024, Cain completed its £124 million refinancing of The Stage, Shoreditch. In 2025, Cain bought The Dominick and announced plans to develop it into a Delano property.

The company has invested in The St. James sports complex, a 450,000 sq. ft. facility in Springfield, Virginia. The complex is part of a planned network of elite sports training academies.

The company seeded Essential Properties Realty Trust, a REIT that went public in June 2018. In 2019, Eldridge Industries invested $300 million in real estate investment company Kennedy Wilson. In 2020, Eldridge Industries co-founded Blackbrook Capital, an independent European real estate investment firm, with a €1 billion investment. Blackbrook merged with Cain in 2024.

In December 2021, the company acquired a minority interest in Langdon Park Capital, a Black-owned real estate investment company." Langdon Park Capital subsequently acquired 200 housing units in Los Angeles as part of a strategy to create affordable housing for the Black and Latino communities.

== Media and culture ==
In 2015, Eldridge Industries put some of its media properties up for sale, including Adweek and the Clio Awards. Adweek was sold a year later to Beringer Capital. The Clio Awards, a 58-year-old ad industry event, was sold to investment company Evolution Media in 2017.

In December 2016, Billboard-Hollywood Reporter Media Group purchased the music publications Spin, Stereogum and Vibe from SpinMedia for an undisclosed amount.

In February 2018, Eldridge Industries announced it would be consolidating three of its entertainment properties into a new company, Valence Media, which rebranded as MRC on July 20, 2020. The properties included Media Rights Capital (MRC), a film and television studio which created Netflix shows Ozark and House of Cards; Dick Clark Productions; and the Billboard-The Hollywood Reporter Media Group. At the time, MRC owned a minority stake in film distributor A24; and London-based production company Fulwell 73.

In December 2019, Valence acquired Nielsen Holdings' music data business. In January 2020, MRC sold music publications Spin and Stereogum to Next Management Partners.

The company has invested in music catalogs as a source of cash flow, similar to real estate. In November 2020, Eldridge Industries acquired the music publishing rights to American rock band The Killers, covering the band's first five albums. Universal Music Publishing Group will continue to administer the catalogue.

In September 2020, it was announced that Penske Media Corporation and MRC would form a joint venture named PMRC. The new venture managed the daily operations of publications such as Billboard, The Hollywood Reporter, Vibe, Variety, Rolling Stone and Music Business Worldwide. A second joint venture between MRC and Penske was also announced, to manage content and intellectual property such as television series, films, and live events including Life Is Beautiful Music & Art Festival and South by Southwest. The venture became the majority owner of South by Southwest in 2021.

Eldridge Industries' special-purpose acquisition company Horizon Acquisition Corporation was founded in 2020. The company filed for a blank check IPO of $575 million in 2020. It merged with ticket reseller Vivid Seats in 2021, taking them public as Vivid. Eldridge Industries bought an additional $24.4 million in Vivid stock in 2023. Vivid is traded on the Nasdaq.

The company has invested in startup fan engagement platform Laylo, content creation management company Fixated, and digital marketing firm Viral Nation, which appeared on the Deloitte Fast 500.

In December 2021, the company partnered with Sony Music Group to finance the acquisition of Bruce Springsteen's recorded music and songwriting catalogue. The deal, which was estimated to be between $500 million and $600 million, was reportedly the largest transaction for an individual artist's music rights to date.

In August 2022, Eldridge Industries and MRC reached an agreement to separate their assets. Eldridge Industries became a minority stakeholder in MRC, acquired ownership of Dick Clark Productions and Billboard-Hollywood Reporter Media Group from the company, and retained its investments in ventures such as Penske Media, A24 and Luminate Data. In 2023, Eldridge Industries and Penske formed the joint venture Penske Media Eldridge, which owns or co-owns properties such as SXSW, Life Is Beautiful, ATX Television Festival, and Dick Clark Productions.

In 2023, it was announced that Eldridge Industries was the largest investor in Gamma, a music media company founded by Larry Jackson. The company partnered with artists such as Snoop Dogg and Usher, and made plans to develop films with A24. It was announced that music executive Sipho Dlamini was president of its operations in Africa and the Middle East, and Naomi Campbell joined as a special advisor. Gamma co-produced and released the soundtrack album for The Color Purple (2023). The company received a $100 million investment in February 2024, bringing its valuation to $400 million. Mariah Carey has also signed with the label to release her upcoming sixteenth album, with the lead single "Type Dangerous."

In 2023, Dick Clark's New Year's Rockin' Eve, which is produced by Dick Clark Productions, was renewed with ABC through 2029. Dick Clark Productions partnered with Spotify to relaunch the Billboard Music Awards as a digital event in 2023.

=== Golden Globes ===
Boehly was interim CEO of the Hollywood Foreign Press Association (HFPA), the organizer of the Golden Globe Awards, from 2021 until 2023. In July 2022, it was announced that Eldridge Industries would acquire the HFPA, and establish a private company to manage the intellectual property of the Golden Globes. In January 2023, Dick Clark Productions, the producer of the Golden Globes, was acquired by the joint venture Penske Media Eldridge.

Under Eldridge Industries' ownership, the organization announced a series of planned reforms, to improve accountability and inclusion. These reforms include the addition of new Golden Globes voters to increase the diversity of its membership, which had previously been criticized for a lack of Black representation. In 2023, the organization added 215 international members to its voting body. This increased the total number of voters from 95 voters prior to the company's ownership to 310 voters, with 52% of the expanded voting body identifying as ethnically diverse and 17% identifying as LGBTQ+. The organization introduced a number of bylaws to prevent member misconduct and conflicts of interest. Members of the Golden Globes Association now receive a salary and are held to a higher level of accountability.

In January 2023, the Golden Globe Awards returned to NBC after not having been televised the previous year. The 2023 show was described by some critics as a comeback for the association, receiving particular praise for the diversity of its nominees and "anything-goes vibe." Michael Schulman of The New Yorker described the atmosphere as "alternately witty and moving." The broadcast had 6.3 million viewers and made 24.2 billion impressions on social media.

In June 2023, Eldridge Industries and Dick Clark Productions acquired the assets, rights and properties of the Golden Globes to operate as a private enterprise. Under this deal, the non-profit Golden Globe Foundation was established to handle the philanthropic efforts of the former HFPA, which was dissolved.

The 2024 Golden Globes aired on CBS on January 7, 2024 and was watched by 9.4 million viewers, the show's highest ratings since before the COVID-19 pandemic. The 2024 Globes included six nominees per category over the former five nominees, and two new awards categories: "Stand-up Comedy" and "Cinematic and Box Office Achievement."
