= Elise Smith =

Female tech entrepreneur

Elise Marie Smith also known as Elise Smith is a tech entrepreneur known for being one of the few Black women in the United States to raise more than $1 million in venture capital funding for the company Praxis Labs.

== Early life and education ==
Smith began by enrolling in the Arabic Language Institute for the Dartmouth Foreign Study Program in Fez, Morocco, which sparked her interest in global learning. Following this experience, she participated in the summer ventures in the management program at Harvard Business School in 2013. Smith earned a bachelor's degree in geography from Dartmouth College. She went on to earn two master's degrees at Stanford University, one in teaching and the other in business administration.

== Career ==
Smith has worked in a variety of firms before becoming a company co-founder. She has worked with the Strategic Advising Team at Bellwether Education and Marketing at Animoto in the Greater. Then, she worked at IBM Watson, where she helped develop education products and led B2B sales and Edtech partnerships. In 2019, Smith and Heather Shen created Praxis Labs, a company that creates learning experiences that allow workers to observe and comprehend bias and discrimination in the workplace from various perspectives by using virtual reality (VR). Praxis Labs work with companies like EBay, Uber, Amazon, Google, Etsy, ServiceNow, and Target. According to a report by digitalundivided, Smith raised the most venture capital funding for Praxis Labs, with about $18.7 million, out of all 750 Latina and Black technology entrepreneurs in the report.
