= Small data =

Small data is data that is 'small' enough for human comprehension. It is data in a volume and format that makes it accessible, informative and actionable.

The term "big data" is about machines and "small data" is about people. This is to say that eyewitness observations or five pieces of related data could be small data. Small data is what we used to think of as data. The only way to comprehend Big data is to reduce the data into small, visually-appealing objects representing various aspects of large data sets (such as histogram, charts, and scatter plots). Big Data is all about finding correlations, but Small Data is all about finding the causation, the reason why.

A formal definition of small data has been proposed by Allen Bonde, former vice-president of Innovation at Actuate - now part of OpenText: "Small data connects people with timely, meaningful insights (derived from big data and/or “local” sources), organized and packaged – often visually – to be accessible, understandable, and actionable for everyday tasks."

Another definition of small data is:

- The small set of specific attributes produced by the Internet of Things. These are typically a small set of sensor data such as temperature, wind speed, vibration and status.

It was estimated (2016) that “If one takes the top 100 biggest innovations of our time, perhaps around 60% to 65% percent are really based on Small Data.” as Martin Lindstrom puts it. Small data includes everything from Snapchat to simple objects such as the post-it note. Lindstrom believes we become so focused on Big-Data that we tend to forget about more basic concepts and creativity. Lindstrom defines Small Data "as seemingly insignificant observations you identify in consumers’ homes, is everything from how you place your shoes on how you hang your paintings". He thus considers that one should perfectly master the basic (Small Data) in order to mine and find correlations.

== Academic Recognition and Methodology ==
The growing significance of "small data" as a distinct field of inquiry was highlighted by the 2024 Thematic Einstein Semester (TES) on Small Data Analysis, hosted by the Berlin Mathematics Research Center MATH+. A central focus of this semester was the transition from theoretical analysis to practical decision-making. Because small data sets are primarily used to drive specific actions, the presentation of results becomes an essential methodological step.

The semester’s findings emphasized that while small data may lack volume, it often contains a high density of "many possible interpretations." Consequently, the final conference of the TES was structured around the pillars of interpretation, explanation, and knowledge gain. Participants sought to develop new mathematical and methodical representations that could accurately depict this wealth of interpretative possibilities. This work underscores that analyzing small data is not purely a computational task; it requires a robust interface between mathematics and diverse disciplines to ensure that insights are both contextually grounded and scientifically rigorous.

== Uses in business ==
=== Marketing ===
Bonde has written about the topic for Forbes, Direct Marketing News, CMO.com and other publications.

According to Martin Lindstrom, in his book, Small Data: "{In customer research, small data is} Seemingly insignificant behavioural observations containing very specific attributes pointing towards an unmet customer need. Small data is the foundation for breakthrough ideas or completely new ways to turnaround brands." His approach is based on the combination of the observation of small samples with intuition. Marketers can obtain market insights from gathering Small Data by engaging with and observing people in their own environments. In comparison to Big Data, Small Data has the power to trigger emotions and to provide insights into the reasons behind the behaviours of customers. It may uncover detailed information on a person's extroversion or introversion, self-confidence, whether one is having problems in his/her relationship, etc. According to Lindstrom, relationships among people and customer segments are organized around four criteria:

1. Climate: It reveals for example how a person's environment affects their diet.
2. Rulership: The power or government in charge
3. Religion: The prevalence of religion in a country, depending on its influence, indicates whether a person's decision making process is impacted by their belief system.
4. Tradition: Cultural norms influence people's behaviors and interactions.

Many companies underestimate the power of Small Data, using samples of millions of consumers instead of recognizing the value of closely observing small samples in their market research. In his book, Lindstrom defines "7Cs", which companies should consider in the attempt to derive meaningful customer insights and market trends through small data from their customers:

1. Collecting: Understanding the manner in which observations are translated inside a home.
2. Clues: Uncovering other distinctive emotional reflections that can be observed.
3. Connecting: Identifying the consequences of emotional behaviour.
4. Causation: Understanding what emotions are being evoked.
5. Correlation: Identifying the initial date of appearance of the behaviour or emotion.
6. Compensation: Identifying the unmet or unfulfilled desire.
7. Concept: Defining the “big idea” compensation for the identified consumer need.

Some of Lindstrom's clients, such as Lowes Foods, considered data differently, and tried to match their customer's lives better. “As you enter their store, they have now created a community where every staff member acts in a character mood, based on Small Data”. The supermarket attempted to make the customer feel at home. This allowed employees to respond to customer feedback. This feedback was gathered from interviews, done at customer’s homes.

=== Healthcare ===
Researchers at Cornell University started developing applications to monitor health problems in patients, based on small data. This is an initiative of Cornell's Small Data Lab, in close cooperation with Weill Cornell Medicine College, led by Deborah Estrin.

The Small Data Lab developed a series of apps, focusing not only on gathering data from patients' pain but also tracking habits in areas such as grocery shopping. In the case of patients with rheumatoid arthritis for example, which has flares and remissions that do not follow a particular cycle, the app gathers information passively, thus allowing to forecast when a flare might be coming up based on small changes in behaviour. Other apps developed also include monitoring online grocery shopping, to use this information from every user to adapt their groceries to the recommendations of nutritionists, or monitoring email language to identify patterns that might indicate "fluctuations in cognitive performance, fatigue, side effects of medication or poor sleep, and other conditions and treatments that are typically self-reported and self-medicated".

=== Postal Service ===
The United States Postal Service (USPS) used optical character recognition (OCR) to automatically read and process 98% of all hand-addressed mail and 99.5% of machine-printed mail. By combining this technology with its small data sample of US zip codes, the USPS can now process more than 36,000 pieces of mail per hour.

=== Aerospace ===
In 2015, Boeing established the analytics lab for aerospace data in cooperation with the Carnegie Mellon University to leverage the university's leadership in machine learning, language technologies and data analytics. One of the initiatives projects aims to by standardize maintenance logs using AI to dramatically reduce costs.

Currently, there is no standardized procedure to document maintenance logs leading to small but highly unstructured data sets. As a result, it becomes highly difficult for maintenance workers to translate these variations in maintenance logs within a short period of time. However, with AI and a narrow data set of common aircraft maintenance terminology, it becomes possible to dynamically translate these logs in real time. By using AI to enhance the speed and accuracy of the airline maintenance workflow, airlines stand to save billions according to the Harvard Business Review.
