= Brad Cleveland =

American author

Brad Cleveland is an author, public speaker, and consultant who focuses on customer experience, call centers / contact centers, technical support centers, social media, and other customer-facing environments. He was one of two initial partners in ICMI (International Customer Management Institute), joining founder Gordon F. MacPherson, Jr. in 1991. Cleveland was a majority shareholder and served as president and CEO of ICMI from 1996 through June 2008 when ICMI became part of London-based United Business Media. He is author/editor of eight books, including Contact Center Management on Fast Forward: Succeeding in the New Era of Customer Experience, which is used in universities and corporate training programs around the world. In 2021, he authored Leading the Customer Experience: How to Chart a Course and Deliver Outstanding Results.

During Cleveland's time as CEO, ICMI expanded its international presence, launched industry membership, developed a management level certification program, rolled out the ACCE and Demo conferences, and expanded its publishing and research division. He has appeared in media ranging from The New York Times to The Washington Post', The Wall Street Journal, Nerd Wallet' and NPR's All Things Considered.

In 1997 Cleveland performed a Tedx Talk entitled "Thriving In An Always-On World" about disconnecting from technology.

== Bibliography ==
- Leading the Customer Experience: How to Chart a Course and Deliver Outstanding Results, by Brad Cleveland (2021). London, Kogan Page. ISBN 978-1789666878.
- Contact Center Management on Fast Forward: Succeeding in the New Era of Customer Experience, by Brad Cleveland (2019). Colorado Springs, ICMI. ISBN 978-0985461133.
- Pocket Guide to Contact Center Management Terms: The Essential Reference for Contact Center, Support Center, and Customer Experience Professionals, by Brad Cleveland (2019). Colorado Springs, ICMI. ISBN 978-0985461126.
- TED Talk: Brad Cleveland: "Thriving In An Always-On World" (TED xSunValley, November 2016), about the curse of always being connected and how to take back control of our lives.
- Call Center Management: Leitfaden für Aufbau, Organisation und Führung von Teleservicecentern (German), by Brad Cleveland, Julia Mayben and Günter Greff (2013). Wiesbaden, Germany, Gabler Verlag. ISBN 978-3322930071.
- コールセンターマネジメント 戦略的顧客応対[理論と実践] Call Center Management Strategic Customer Service [Theory and Practice] (Japanese), by Brad Cleveland (2008). Tokyo, ファーストプレス. ISBN 978-4904336090.
- Call Center Management on Fast Forward: Succeeding in Today's Dynamic Customer Contact Environment, by Brad Cleveland (2006). Annapolis Maryland, ICMI Press. ISBN 978-1932558067.
- Call Center Management on Fast Forward: Succeeding in Today's Dynamic Customer Contact Environment, by Brad Cleveland and Julia Mayben (1997). Annapolis Maryland, Call Center Press. ISBN 978-0965909303.

== Awards ==
Leading the Customer Experience, was selected as a NYC Big Book Award distinguished favorite.

== Personal ==
Brad lives in Sun Valley, Idaho [link], with his wife Kirsten. They have a grown daughter, Grace. Brad has an office in San Diego, California.

== See also ==
- Brad Cleveland's Official Website
- Brad's Blog
- Brad Cleveland Bio
