= Pickavance =

Pickavance is an English surname.

The name may refer to:

People:

- Ian Pickavance (born 1968), an English former professional rugby league footballer
- Norman Pickavance, an advisor, author and activist involved in organisation and societal renewal
- Stephen Pickavance, a British former competitive figure skater
- Thomas Gerald Pickavance (1915–1991), a British nuclear physicist
