= Cyera =

American cybersecurity company

- Type: Private
- Industry: Cybersecurity
- Founded: 2021; 5 years ago
- Founders: Yotam Segev; Tamar Bar-Ilan; Yonatan Itay
- Headquarters: New York City, United States
- Products: Data security software
- Website: www.cyera.com

Cyera is an American cybersecurity company headquartered in New York City, with a research and development center in Tel Aviv, Israel. It develops data security and artificial intelligence governance software in the cybersecurity category known as data security posture management.

== History ==
Cyera was founded in 2021 by Yotam Segev and Tamar Bar-Ilan. The company opened offices in New York and Tel Aviv, where Yonatan Itay led the engineering team. Itay was later formally recognized as Cyera's third founding partner and co-founder.

Among Cyera's early investors were Sequoia Capital and Cyberstarts. In 2023, the company raised a funding round led by Accel. Another round followed in April 2024, when Cyera raised $300 million in financing led by Coatue. In November 2024, the company raised an additional $300 million in a round led by Accel and Sapphire Ventures.

In October 2024, Cyera acquired the Israeli cybersecurity company Trail Security in a deal valued at approximately $162 million. Trail Security developed data loss prevention software.

In June 2025, Cyera raised $540 million in a Series E funding round that valued the company at $6 billion. Around the same time, the company acquired the Israeli startups Shape AI and Otterize, which developed software for non-human identity security.

In 2025, former Snowflake chief executive Frank Slootman joined Cyera's board of directors.

In January 2026, the company raised another $400 million in a funding round led by Blackstone. Five months later, in June 2026, Cyera raised $600 million in a Series G round that valued the company at $12 billion, bringing its total funding to more than $2.3 billion. The round was led by Evolution Equity Partners, with participation from Cyberstarts and Temasek, in addition to existing investors. In September 2026 Cyera received a further $400 million from Goldman Sachs Alternatives as an extension of the Series G round, bringing its total funding to more than $2.7 billion.

In July 2026 Cyera agreed to acquire Oasis Security, an Israeli company working in non-human identity management, in a deal valued at about $1 billion, and completed the purchase in September. Cyera said the Oasis platform would operate under the name Cyera Identity.

In November 2026, it was reported that Israeli venture capital fund Cyberstarts is prepared to invest $300 million in Cyera.

== Operations and products ==
Cyera develops software used by enterprises to identify, classify, and manage sensitive information across cloud platforms, SaaS applications, and on-premises systems.

The company operates in the field of data security posture management, a category of cybersecurity software focused on protecting enterprise data in cloud environments.

As of 2025, the company operated in about ten countries and employed nearly 800 people.

In 2025, Cyera introduced Omni DLP, an AI-based data loss prevention product that identifies sensitive data before it leaves an organization's systems.

The company later introduced AI Guardian, a product focused on AI governance and identity controls, which it positioned around securing data in agentic AI environments.
