= Moveworks =

American artificial intelligence company

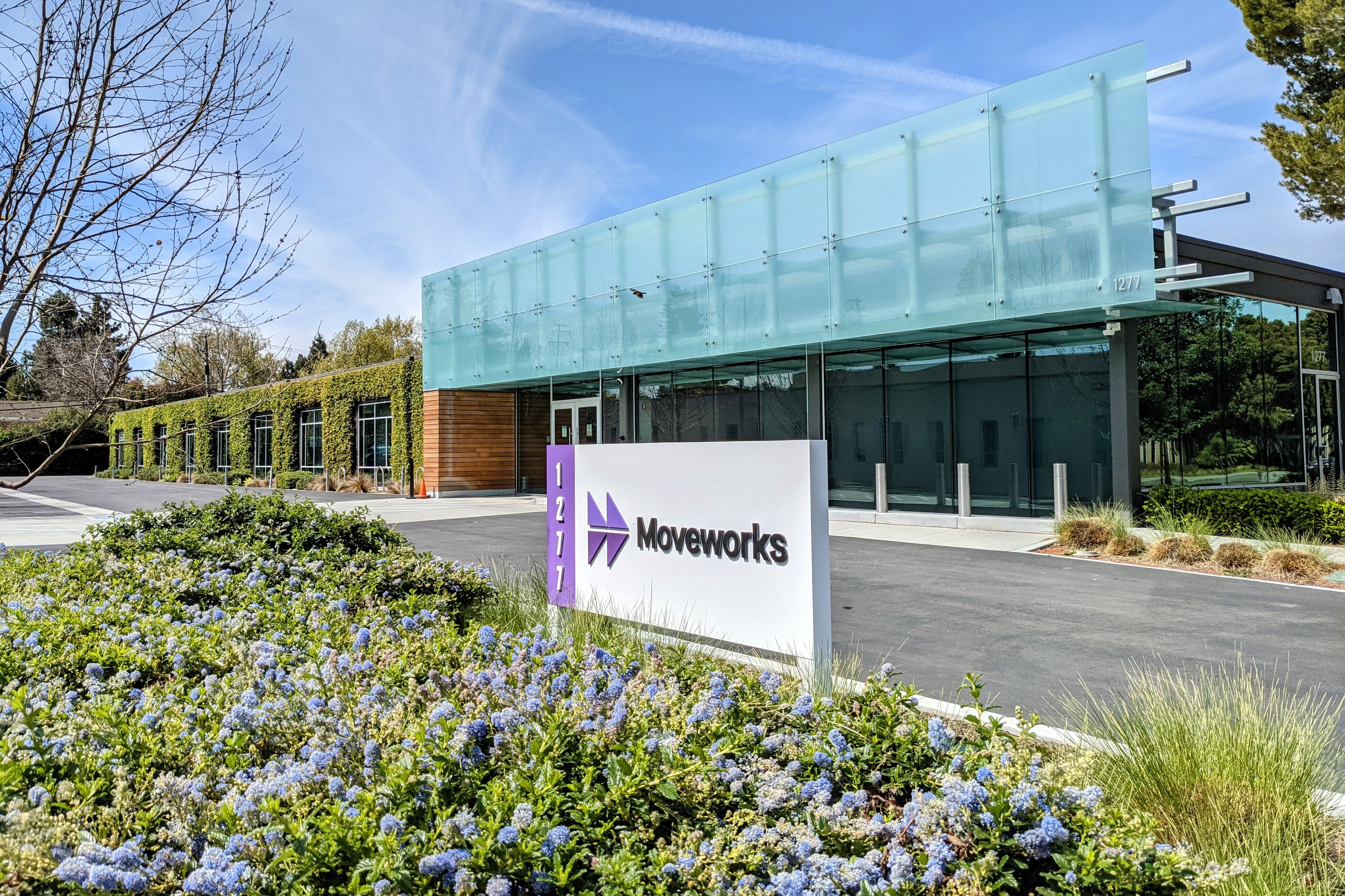
- Former headquarters in Los Altos, California
- Type: Private
- Industry: Enterprise software Artificial intelligence Natural language understanding Probabilistic machine learning
- Founded: 2016; 10 years ago
- Founders: Bhavin Shah; Vaibhav Nivargi; Varun Singh; Jiang Chen
- Headquarters: Mountain View, California, U.S.
- Key people: Bhavin Shah (CEO) Vaibhav Nivargi (CTO) Varun Singh (VP of Product) Jiang Chen (VP of Machine Learning)
- Owner: ServiceNow
- Number of employees: 500+
- Website: moveworks.com

Moveworks is an American artificial intelligence (AI) company headquartered in Mountain View, California.

It develops an AI platform, designed for large enterprises, that uses natural language understanding (NLU), probabilistic machine learning, and automation to resolve workplace requests. Autodesk and Broadcom are some of their client companies.

Its platform analyzes requests made by company employees to its chatbot, and resolves them through through integration with other software applications. It is available in business communication tools such as Slack and Microsoft Teams, as well as through online platforms such as ServiceNow and SharePoint.

As of its Series C financing round in June 2021, Moveworks is valued at $2.1 billion and has raised $315 million in total funding. The company’s investors include Tiger Global, Alkeon Capital, and other firms.

In December 2025, Moveworks was acquired by ServiceNow.

== History ==
Moveworks was founded in 2016 by Bhavin Shah, Vaibhav Nivargi, Varun Singh, and Jiang Chen.

The founders recognized the potential of an AI-powered chatbot to resolve a significant portion of employees’ support issues, without involvement from a corporate help desk. This model would enable self-service for employees with common requests or questions.

After working with a group of lighthouse customers to automate IT support use cases, the firm came out of "stealth mode" in April 2019, following a $30 million Series A investment from Lightspeed Venture Partners and Bain Capital. The company raised a $75 million Series B round in November 2019 and a $200 million Series C round in June 2021.

Moveworks initially solved employees’ IT support issues. In March 2021, it expanded its Employee Service Platform to address issues concerning other lines of business, including HR, finance, and facilities. The firm also released an internal communications solution that allows company leaders to send interactive messages to employees.

Moveworks was recognized as the Best Chatbot Solution at the 2021 AI Breakthrough Awards, named to the Forbes AI 50 in 2019, 2020, and 2021, and selected as one of the Most Innovative Tech Companies of the Year at the 2021 American Business Awards.

In December 2025, nine months after agreeing to buy it for $2.9 billion, ServiceNow completed the acquisition of Moveworks.

== Technology ==
The Moveworks platform comprises a multitude of specialized machine learning models, such as variants of the BERT language model. These models are trained on historical support tickets in order to process and fulfill new requests; for example, answering policy questions, accessing software, and editing email groups. As of October 2021, Moveworks is capable of resolving requests written in across 100+ languages.

A central goal of Moveworks' machine learning process is to augment the "small data" of its customers. Training deep learning models often requires very large data sets; for example, millions of annotated requests for a new laptop. Whereas few companies possess a sufficient quantity of such requests from their own employees, Moveworks leverages Collective Learning across many companies to make high-accuracy predictions about how to resolve a given issue.
