= David Wales =

David Wales may refer to:

- David J. Wales (born 1963), Professor of Chemistry at the University of Cambridge
- David Art Wales (born 1964), Australian entrepreneur
