= Knoema =

Privately-owned data technology company

- Type: Private
- Founded: 2011
- Founders: Vladimir Eskin; Vladimir Bougay
- Headquarters: New York City, New York, United States
- Key people: Charles Poliacof (CEO); Vladimir Bougay (CTO); Andrew Dubois (COO); Richard Yonkers (Head of Sales); Dr. Ilya Vadeiko (Head of Product); Dr. Ian Cook (Head of Data)
- Website: knoema.com

Knoema Corporation is a privately owned New York–based data technology company.

It was founded in 2011 and launched in 2014. The company employs data engineers, economists, and developers based in New York City and Washington, DC.

Knoema offers access to data visualization resources for more than 3.9 billion time series from more than 1,500 sources that are commonly used in open press and other publications globally and referenced in data aggregator and science libraries.

== History ==
Knoema was launched in 2014 under a collaboration with the African Development Bank to develop the African information highway, a multi-year open data and data transparency initiative. The company also worked with the European Commission Joint Research Centre and the African Development Bank to develop digital data collection and distribution of food commodities price data in Africa. Knoema also provided SDMX-compliant systems to facilitate structured data collection and sharing between national governments and the International Monetary Fund.

In February 2020, the firm pushed into the alternative data space through its acquisition of Adaptive Management, an alternative data aggregator and solutions provider.

In 2020, Knoema continued to develop partnerships with many data vendors. On 3 November 2020, Knoema launched its new data catalog, branded as "Alternative Data+." This catalog is made up of hundreds of alternative data tear sheets that feature information about each data provider including tickers and sectors covered, known biases, and in some cases, pricing, metadata, and sample datasets.

In December 2020, Knoema was acquired by Eldridge Industries and received investment from Snowflake Ventures.

== Projects ==
Knoema knowledge management solutions have been deployed to Fortune 500 companies, multilateral institutions, asset managers, non-profits, and governments worldwide.
