= Luddy School of Informatics, Computing, and Engineering =

Computer science and engineering school in the U.S. state of Indiana

Coordinates: 39°10′19.0″N 86°31′21.5″W

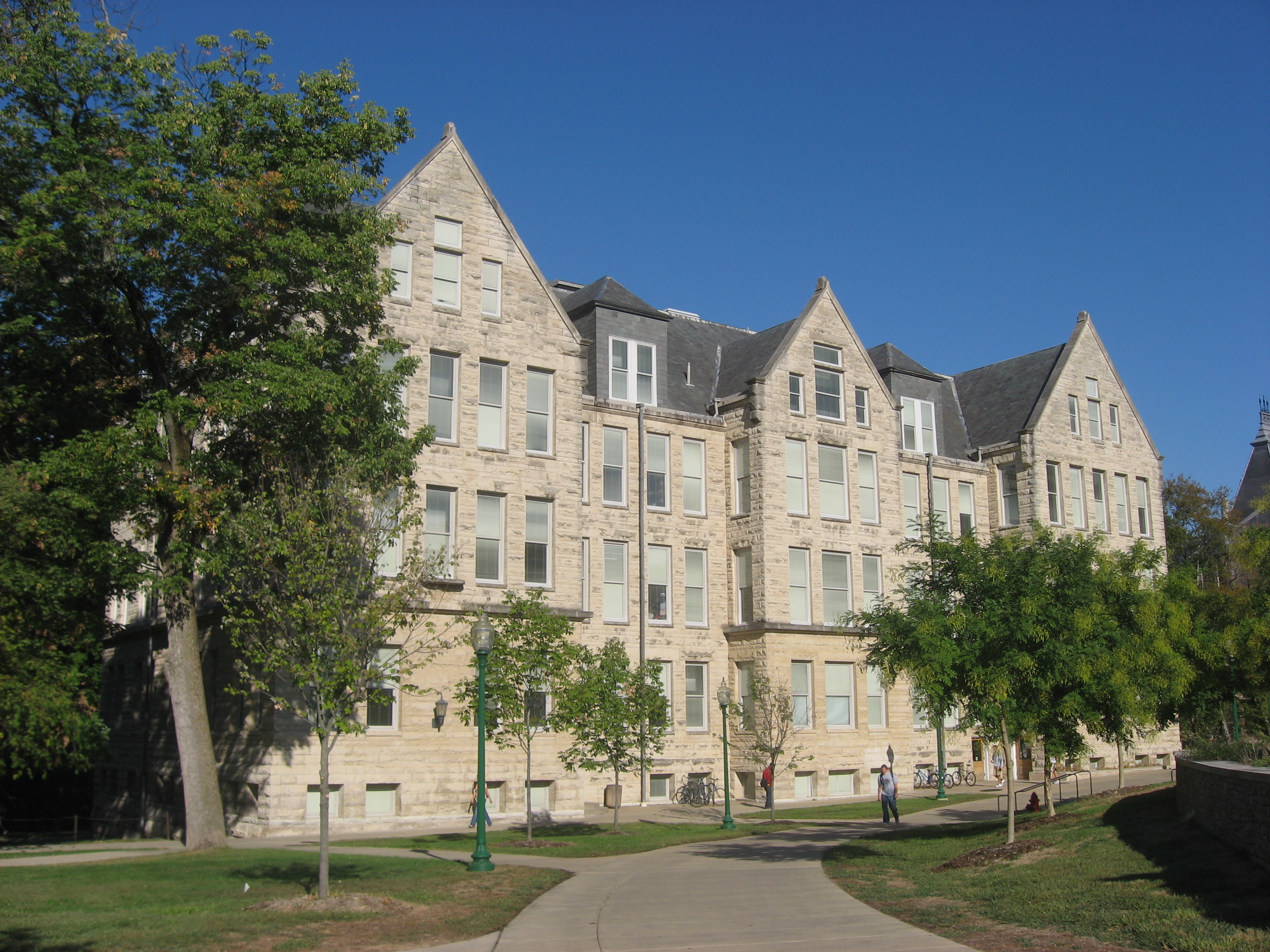
- Lindley Hall, home of school in Bloomington

Location
- 919 East 10th St., Bloomington, Indiana, 47408 and 535 West Michigan St., Indianapolis, Indiana, 46202

Information
- Established: 2017
- Dean: Joanna Millunchick
- Enrollment: 3069
- Campus: Bloomington and Indianapolis
- Website: luddy.indiana.edu

The Luddy School of Informatics, Computing, and Engineering is an academic unit of Indiana University located on the Indiana University Bloomington (IUB) campus and on the Indiana University Indianapolis (IUI) campus. On the Bloomington campus, the school consists of the Department of Informatics, the Department of Computer Science, the Department of Information and Library Science, and the Department of Intelligent Systems Engineering. On the Indianapolis campus, the school consists of the Department of Human-Centered Computing, the Department of BioHealth Informatics, and the Department of Library and Information Science.

== History ==
The School of Informatics was founded in 2000 as the first school of its kind in the United States. That fall, the first classes were offered on both campuses. Two years later, in 2002, the school hired its first full professor (Bill Aspray) and conferred its first degrees (22 students).

By the end of 2004, the school had buildings of its own – a former sorority house on the north side of the Bloomington campus, and the newly constructed Informatics and Communications Technology Complex (ICTC) building on the Indianapolis (IUI) campus. In 2005, the Department of Computer Science joined the school in Bloomington, significantly changing the research and course offerings of the five-year-old organization. At that time, the school had 1,500 students and had graduated 600 students.

In 2007, with the retirement of founding dean Mike Dunn, Bobby Schnabel, former vice provost/associate vice chancellor at the University of Colorado-Boulder, took over. Raj Acharya, the founding director and head of the School of Electrical Engineering and Computer Science at Penn State University, replaced Schnabel in 2016. The school has continued to grow, with nearly 150 faculty, over 2,000 students, and multiple buildings between the two campuses.

In July 2013, the School of Informatics merged with the School of Library and Information Science and became the School of Informatics and Computing on both campuses. Administrators from both schools claimed that the closeness of the subject matter studied in Library and Information Science and Informatics made the union practical and would offer students and faculty a greater breadth.

In August 2017, the name of the School of Informatics and Computing on the Bloomington campus was officially changed to the School of Informatics, Computing, and Engineering (SICE) following the addition of a new major in Intelligent Systems Engineering. In January 2018, the Bloomington school moved into Luddy Hall.

In October 2019, the Bloomington school was renamed Luddy School of Informatics, Computing, and Engineering in honor of Indiana University alumnus and information technology pioneer Fred Luddy.

== Departments ==
=== Bloomington campus ===
- Computer Science
- Informatics
- Information and Library Science
- Intelligent Systems Engineering
- Data Science

=== Indianapolis campus ===
- BioHealth Informatics
- Human-Centered Computing
- Library and Information Science

== Programs ==
=== Bloomington campus ===
Undergraduate programs include:

- Bachelor of Science in Computer Science, Data Science, Informatics, Intelligent Systems Engineering
- Accelerated BS/MS Program in Computer Science, Information Science, Intelligent Systems Engineering, Library Science

Graduate programs include:

- Master of Information Science
- Master of Library Science
- Master of Science in Bioinformatics, Computer Science, Data Science, Human–Computer Interaction, Animal-Computer Interaction, Informatics, Intelligent Systems Engineering, Secure Computing
- Graduate Certificate in Cybersecurity, Data Science, Information Architecture
- Accelerated Master's Program in Computer Science, Information Science, Intelligent Systems Engineering, Library Science
- Ph.D. in Computer Science, Informatics, Information Science, Intelligent Systems Engineering, Animal-Computer Interaction

=== Indianapolis campus ===
Undergraduate programs include:

- Bachelor of Science in Biomedical Informatics, Health Information Management, Informatics, Media Arts and Science, Applied Data and Information Science, Artificial Intelligence
- Accelerated BS/MS Program in Applied Data Science, Bioinformatics, Health Informatics, Human–Computer Interaction, Media Arts and Science

Graduate programs include:

- Master of Science in Applied Data Science, Bioinformatics, Health Informatics, Human–Computer Interaction, Media Arts and Science
- Ph.D. in Data Science, Informatics

== Luddy Hall ==
The current home of Luddy on the Bloomington campus Luddy Hall broke ground in 2015. The building was named for the Luddy family, many members of which are Indiana University alumni, including tech entrepreneur and IU donor Fred Luddy. The building opened at the end of the Fall 2017 semester, and SICE moved in for the Spring 2018 semester.

The 124,000-square-foot (11,500 m^{2}) building cost of $39.8 million. The building contains five research labs and 19 conference rooms, and also houses faculty offices and serves as the meeting place for most Luddy classes.

== Rankings ==
- Department of Information and Library Science ranked 9th by U.S. News & World Report in 2017
- Information and Library Science Discipline ranked 2nd in 2017 Academic Ranking of World Universities
