= Mane 'n Tail =

Brand name of a series of hair and skin care products for humans and horses

- Product type: Personal care
- Current owner: Straight Arrow Products, Inc.
- Country: United States
- Markets: Worldwide
- Website: manentail.com

Mane 'n Tail is the brand name of a series of hair and skin care products for humans and horses.

== Involvement in The Greatest Movie Ever Sold ==
The product was featured in Morgan Spurlock's 2011 documentary POM Wonderful Presents: The Greatest Movie Ever Sold as one of the corporate sponsors. Although featured heavily throughout the film, the end titles of the film point out that the company did not pay for the sponsorship deal.

On the Mane 'n Tail website, management explains: "Mane 'n Tail is no stranger to doing product placement in major motion pictures, this however, was our first foray into the indie film arena as Morgan sought us out to participate in the film about product placement funded strictly by product placement. When we agreed to jump on board, we had no idea what an incredible opportunity it would blossom into. Sony Pictures Classics picked up the film three days before its Sundance premiere, much to everyone’s delight. The publicity has been unbelievable and our part in the movie... we absolutely adore. Although we are a 'sponsor', Mane 'n Tail did not pay to be part of the film, instead we exchanged our product, a true 'product placement' deal."

== Appearances in pop culture ==
Mane 'n Tail has also had other motion pictures besides "The Greatest Movie Ever Sold". These include:

- Blades of Glory
- Spirit Untamed

=== Involvement in NASCAR ===
In 1995, Mane 'n Tail would sponsor NASCAR Winston Cup Series driver Derrike Cope, driving the #12 car for Bobby Allison Motorsports. They would first sponsor at the 1995 Daytona 500, where Cope would finish 31st. Throughout the early races of the 1996 season, Mane 'n Tail would sponsor all the races for Cope, with Cope netting one top 10 finish at the 1996 Goodwrench Service 400. Mane 'n Tail would sponsor until the 1996 Goody's Headache Powder 500, where Mane 'n Tail left the team.

In 2017, Mane 'n Tail would return to NASCAR, once again sponsoring Cope for a one-off, who was now driving the #55 for Premium Motorsports. They sponsored the throwback race at Darlington, throwing back to his original 1996 scheme.

In 2018, Derrike Cope would start up a new team, StarCom Racing. Mane 'n Tail would once again sponsor as a one-off, this time sponsoring Landon Cassill in the #00 at Michigan International Speedway. They would once again sponsor Cassill in 2019, with them sponsoring at-home track Pocono Raceway.

In 2020, with new driver Quin Houff, they would sponsor StarCom Racing for more races, sponsoring 4 races in the midseason.

In 2021, they expanded their sponsorship, including sponsorship at the 2021 Daytona 500. Starting at the 2021 Texas Grand Prix, Mane 'n Tail would partner with DreamWorks movie Spirit Untamed, to promote the movie.
