= Sridhar Ramaswamy =

Indian-American computer scientist and businessman

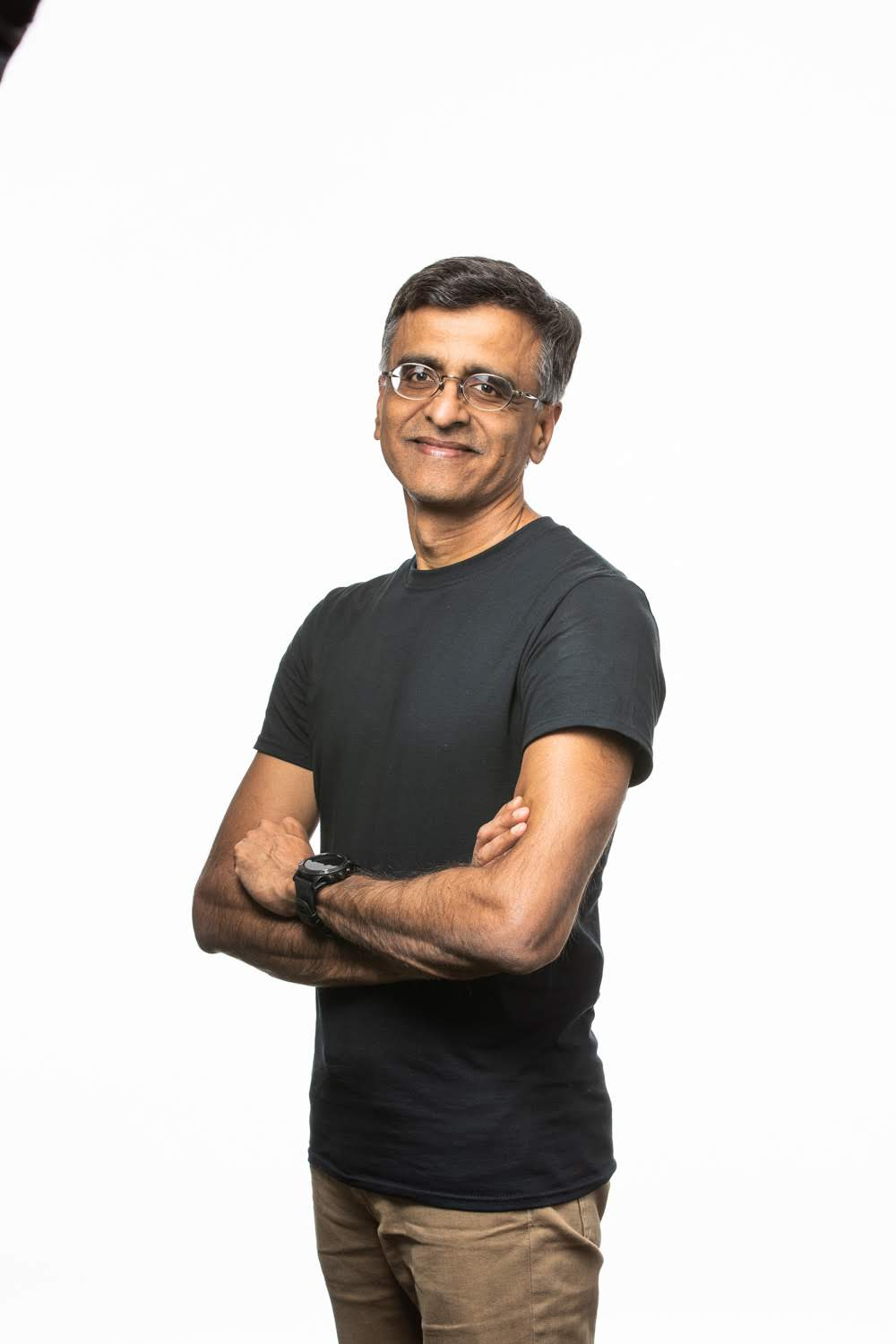
- Ramaswamy in 2020
- Born: 1967 (age 57–58); Tiruchirappalli, Tamil Nadu, India
- Education: IIT Madras (BTech); Brown University (MS, PhD)
- Known for: co-founding Neeva formerly running Google's ad business
- Title: CEO of Snowflake Inc.
- Children: 2
- Scientific career
- Thesis: Indexing for Data Models with Classes and Constraints (1995)
- Doctoral advisor: Paris Kanellakis

Sridhar Ramaswamy (born 1967) is an Indian-American computer scientist and executive. He has been the chief executive officer of cloud-based data-warehousing company Snowflake Inc. since February 2024. He was the cofounder and CEO of the startup company Neeva, an ad-free, privacy-focused search engine, until it was acquired by Snowflake.

== Early life and education ==
Ramaswamy was born in 1967 in Tiruchirappalli, Tamil Nadu, India. He received a bachelor's degree in computer science from IIT Madras. He immigrated to the United States in 1989 and received a master's degree and PhD in computer science from Brown University.

== Career ==
After graduating from college, Ramaswamy researched database analytics for three years at Bell Labs and held similar positions at Lucent Technologies and Bell Communications Research. While working for E.piphany as a machine learning systems developer, Google began recruiting engineers from the company.

Ramaswamy joined Google in 2003 to work on the back-end infrastructure of AdWords as a mid-level engineer. He worked his way up the company over the course of 15 years. In 2013, he was promoted to senior vice president of advertising and commerce at Google.

Ramaswamy left Google in 2018 to become a partner at venture capitalist firm Greylock Partners. In 2019, he created Neeva as an alternative to Google Search, after becoming disillusioned with the limitations of the ad-supported search model. Instead of ads, Ramaswamy planned a subscription-based model for Neeva. Neeva was launched in the US in 2021 and the next year in the UK, France, and Germany; Neeva was acquired by Snowflake Inc. in 2023. In February 2024, Ramaswamy succeeded Frank Slootman as Snowflake's CEO.

== Personal life ==
Ramaswamy lives in Cupertino, California, with his wife and two sons.
