= Bill McDermott =

American businessman (born 1961)

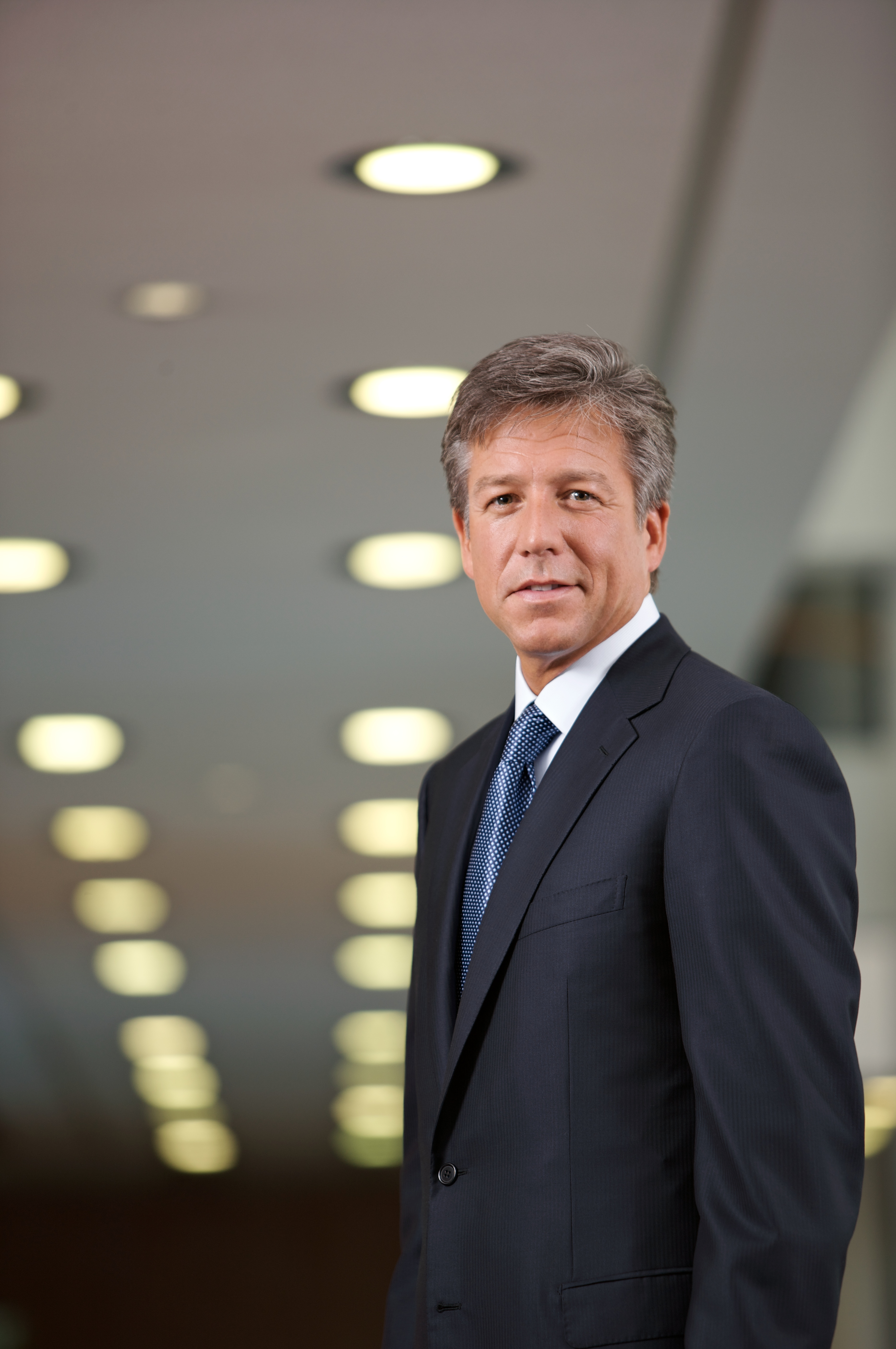
- McDermott in 2008
- Born: William R. McDermott; August 18, 1961 (age 65); New York City, U.S.
- Education: Dowling College (BBA); Northwestern University (MBA); University of Pennsylvania
- Occupation: Businessman
- Known for: ServiceNow, SAP SE
- Spouse: Julie McDermott
- Children: 2
- Relatives: Bobby McDermott (grandfather)

William R. McDermott (born August 18, 1961) is an American businessman and CEO of ServiceNow. Before ServiceNow, he was the CEO of the technology company SAP SE. During his tenure as co-CEO and then sole CEO of the company, SAP's market value increased from $39 billion to $156 billion. McDermott, along with Joanne Gordon, wrote a memoir, Winners Dream: A Journey from Corner Store to Corner Office, and was awarded a gold medal for business memoir of the year by the Axiom Business Book Awards. McDermott began his role as CEO of ServiceNow in November 2019.

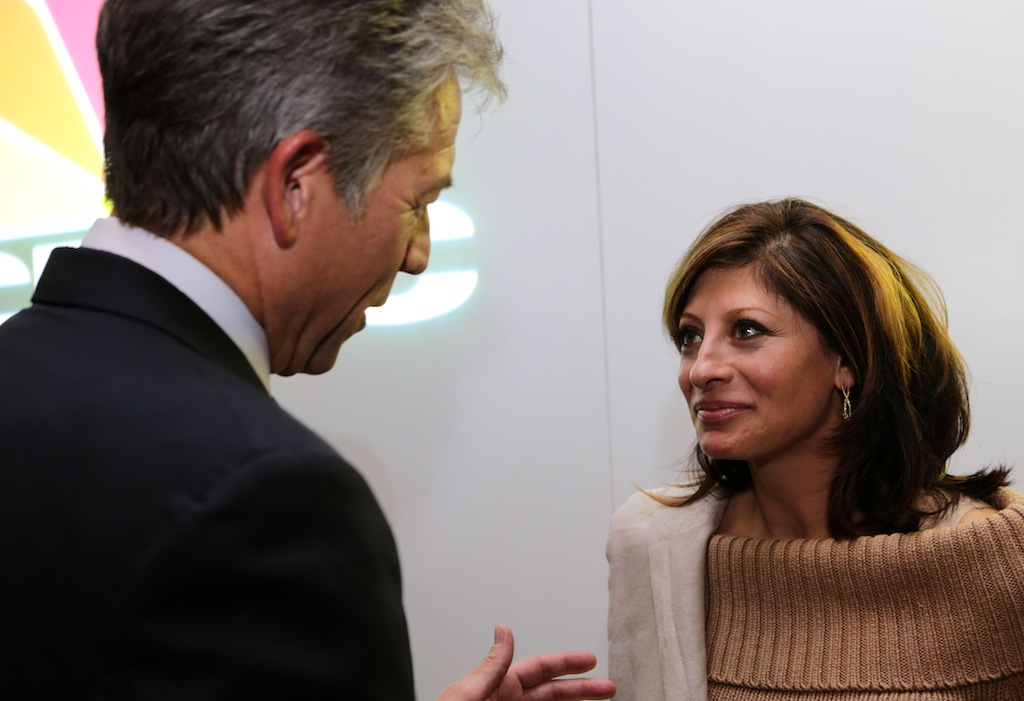
Bill McDermott and Maria Bartiromo (FOX Business)

== Early years ==
Bill McDermott was born in Amityville on Long Island, where he also grew up. He is one of four children to Kathleen and Bill McDermott and a grandson to Naismith Memorial Basketball Hall of Fame player Bobby McDermott. At age 16, he bought the Amityville Country Delicatessen on Long Island for $7,000.

== Education ==
McDermott attended the Amityville Memorial High School and studied business management at Dowling College. His deli business helped him pay for his undergraduate education. After completing his undergraduate studies, McDermott attended Northwestern University's Kellogg School of Management where he earned his MBA, and then completed the Executive Development Program at the Wharton School of Business.

== Career ==
=== Xerox, Gartner and Siebel Systems ===
McDermott worked for 17 years at Xerox and then became the president of Gartner in 2000. From 2001 to 2002, he was executive vice president of worldwide sales and operations at Siebel Systems.

=== SAP ===
In 2002, McDermott was appointed by SAP as the CEO of SAP America. He was designated to the SAP Executive Board in 2008, and in February 2010, he became the co-CEO of SAP AG. After four years, on May 21, 2014, McDermott became the first American to become the CEO of the company, now known as SAP SE. SAP's market capitalization increased from $39 billion to $144 billion between 2010 and 2018. In 2016 McDermott became the best-paid executive leading the companies that form the German stock index DAX by earning a direct remuneration of €11.6 million. On October 10, 2019, McDermott decided to leave SAP SE. SAP did many acquisitions under his tenure, starting with Sybase in 2010.

=== ServiceNow ===
At the end of October 2019 after McDermott stepped down from SAP, ServiceNow announced his appointment as CEO. He succeeded John Donahoe at the end of 2019 as Donahoe finished his tenure at the company. He cited "the company’s strength in cloud computing and enterprise software, and the challenge of building an already vibrant company further" as reasons for him to join ServiceNow as CEO.

In 2021, McDermott was the 3rd highest paid CEO of all S&P 500 CEOs, receiving over $162 million in equity and $3.5 million in cash and other forms of compensation from ServiceNow.

In 2022, McDermott said "that there's a real place in the world for the metaverse," and that ServiceNow could help someone "create an e-mall in the metaverse".

== Awards and honors ==
In 2016, McDermott was named "Manager of the Year" by the German Business Daily Handelsblatt. He has received numerous awards for his civic leadership, which includes:

1. GENYOUth's Vanguard Award.
2. City Year's Idealist of the Year.
3. The We Are Family Foundation's Visionary Award,
4. Children's Aid Society's Promise Award.

McDermott recently was recognized as a top CEO by Glassdoor in Canada, the United States, the United Kingdom, and Germany.

== Other activities ==
McDermott is a member of the Business Roundtable. He wrote the forward for Transform Your Business and The Leadership Conversation: Make Bold Change One Conversation at a Time by Rose Fass.

McDermott is a board member of Zoom Communications since 2022 and Figma since 2025. He was previously on the boards of Fisker until 2024 and Under Armour until 2019.

== Personal life ==
McDermott and his wife Julie have two sons. In July 2015, McDermott slipped and fell down the stairs while carrying a glass of water. The glass shattered into pieces, with one going through his left eye. He underwent "11 or 12 surgeries by the time it was all done", but ultimately the accident cost him his left eye. McDermott returned to SAP headquarters in October of that same year, with one eye. He is the grandson of Bobby McDermott.
