= Frank Slootman =

Technology CEO and businessman (born 1958)

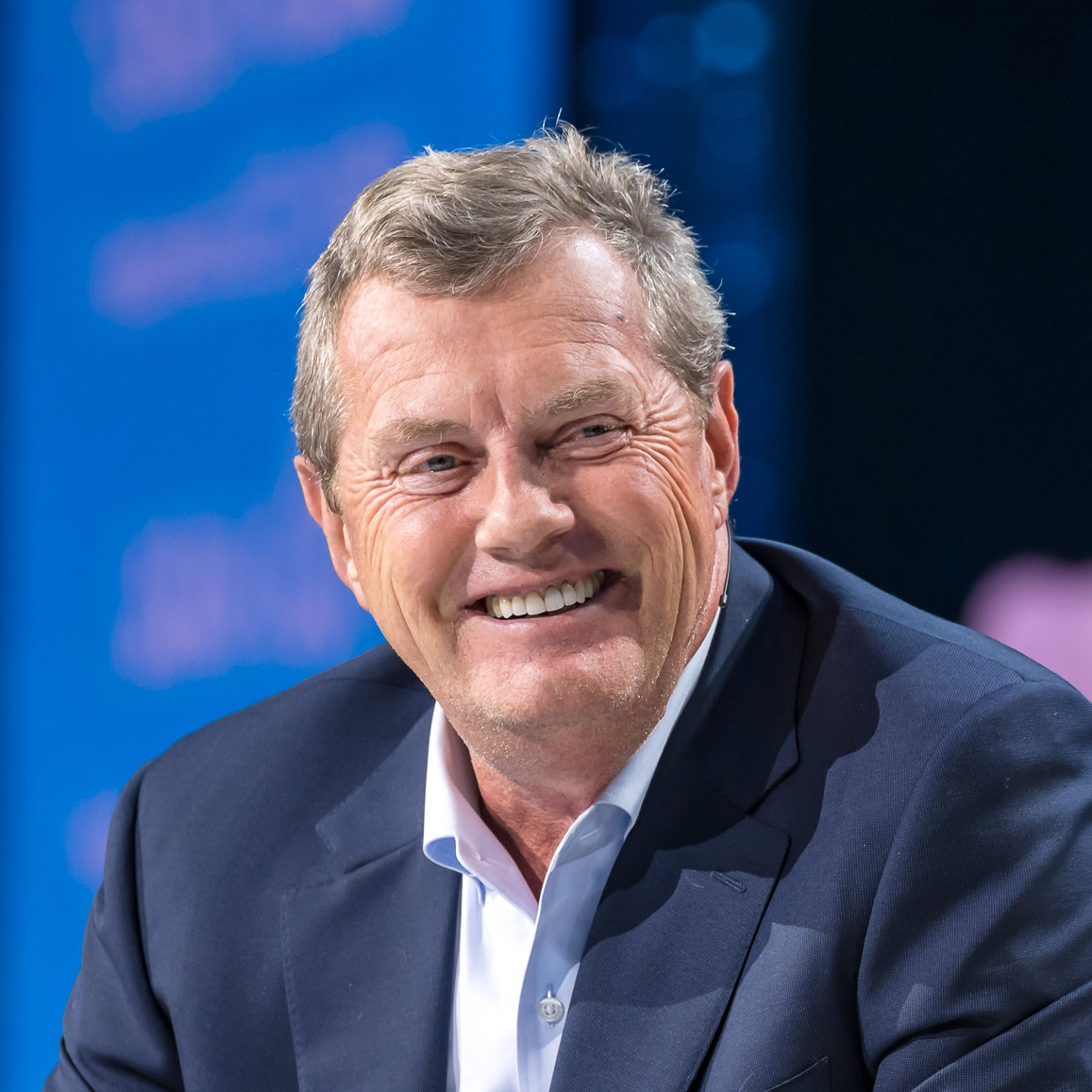
- Born: 1958 (age 67–68); Netherlands
- Education: Erasmus University Rotterdam
- Occupation: Businessperson
- Employer: Snowflake
- Title: Chairman of the board
- Website: LinkedIn

Frank Slootman (born 1958) is a businessman and author known for growing companies founded by others. Slootman has taken three companies through an initial public offering.

== Early life and education ==
Slootman was born in the Netherlands and earned a degree in economics at Erasmus University Rotterdam. He did market research for tire company Uniroyal, before earning a doctorate in General Business Administration from the same university. After graduating, Slootman moved to the United States in 1982.

== Career ==
Slootman's first management position was at Compuware in 1995.

His first CEO position was at Data Domain in 2003. During his time at Data Domain, the company raised funding to avoid bankruptcy and increased revenue for the next four years. He left Data Domain in 2009 as part of EMC's acquisition of the company. He was CEO of the company when it went public in 2007.

He was appointed CEO of ServiceNow in 2011, then led its initial public offering the next year. He also converted ServiceNow from a help-desk provider to a broader IT services business.

Slootman was appointed CEO of Snowflake on April 26, 2019. Slootman prepared the company for an initial public offering during the COVID-19 pandemic. Slootman held a 5.9% interest in the company during the IPO.

In 2022, Slootman published a book called Amp it Up: Leading for Hypergrowth by Raising Expectations, Increasing Urgency and Elevating Intensity.

On February 28, 2024, Snowflake announced that Slootman was retiring and Sridhar Ramaswamy would be replacing him as CEO. He would remain Chairman of the Board.

In 2025, Slootman joined the board of directors of data-security company Cyera.

== Books ==
- Slootman, Frank (2022-01-19). Amp It Up. John Wiley & Sons. ISBN 978-1-119-83611-7.
- Slootman, Frank (May 13, 2011). TAPE SUCKS: Inside Data Domain, A Silicon Valley Growth Story. ISBN 978-0-615-48406-8.
- Slootman, Frank; Hamm, Steve (December 4, 2020). Rise of the Data Cloud. ISBN 978-1728363608.
