= Neeva =

Search Engine

- Website type: Search engine
- Dissolved: June 2, 2023
- Founders: Sridhar Ramaswamy, Vivek Raghunathan
- Current status: Inactive

Neeva was an AI-powered search engine and web browser founded in 2019 that emphasized protecting searchers' privacy. It utilized various APIs of other websites to show quick results to queries and for traditional links it used the help of its partners and its own crawler. It shut down in June 2023 and was bought by Snowflake Inc.

The company was based in Mountain View, California and had 25 employees as of June 19, 2020.

== History ==
Neeva was founded in 2019 by Sridhar Ramaswamy and Vivek Raghunathan. Neeva had raised $77.5m from investors.

In 2021, Vivaldi partnered up with Neeva to integrate the search engine into its browser.

In 2023, the co-founders announced that they will be shutting down the consumer search engine on June 2. According to them, the main reason for that decision was how hard it was to persuade normal users to make the switch. They thanked customers and announced that they would be compensating users for the unused portion of Neeva accounts and reallocating their tools and technologies to other industries.

In May 2023, Snowflake announced the acquisition of Neeva, for $185.4M in cash. This was to accelerate the search in the Cloud through Artificial Intelligence. Following the acquisition, Neeva co-founder Sridhar Ramaswamy later became the CEO of Snowflake.

Neeva was shut down on June 2, 2023, following the announcements from the co-founders and the acquisition. Following the shutdown, the website was taken down and the web browser is no longer available for download from app stores.

== Features ==
=== Search results ===
Neeva's search results were a compilation of various partners including Yelp, Ignite, Intrinio, Microsoft Bing, and its own Web crawler. It included weather information from The Weather Channel and maps data from Apple Inc. Neeva also allowed customers to link personal items which could then be searched.

== See also ==
- Comparison of web search engines
