= Fred Luddy =

American billionaire businessman

Frederic B Luddy
- Born: November 24, 1954 (age 71)
- Education: Indiana University Bloomington (dropped out)
- Known for: Founder, ServiceNow

Fred Luddy (born 1954) is an American billionaire businessman, and the founder of ServiceNow, a cloud computing company.

== Early life ==
Luddy grew up in New Castle, Indiana, the son of an accountant father and a Catholic schoolteacher mother.

Luddy went to Indiana University Bloomington, but dropped out, as he was spending too much time doing computer programming.

== Career ==
Prior to ServiceNow, Luddy worked at Amdahl Corporation, co-founded Enterprise Software, and served as chief technology officer at Peregrine Systems.

In 2004, his then net worth of $35 million was lost due to an accounting fraud at Peregrine Systems, of which he was the CTO.

Luddy founded ServiceNow in 2004, two weeks before his 50th birthday, "I couldn't wait, because there was something psychologically that said I couldn't start a company at 50."

Luddy stepped down as CEO of ServiceNow in 2011, then focused on product development, and moved to an advisory role in 2016. He remains on the ServiceNow board.

As of October 2023, Luddy's net worth was estimated at $1.2 billion.

== World Team Tennis ==
Luddy acquired a majority ownership of the San Diego Aviators in 2015. He served as the Chairman of the Board of the team.

In 2017, Luddy was part of a purchase of World Team Tennis from Billie Jean King. He is now a majority owner with Eric Davidson.

== Philanthropy ==
Luddy Hall at the Luddy School of Informatics, Computing, and Engineering at Indiana University Bloomington was named in recognition of a donation from Luddy, and "in honor of the many IU alumni in the Luddy family, including Fred's mother, father, sister and two brothers".

== Awards ==
In 2023, Fred Luddy received the Horatio Alger Award.
