= Small Data =

2016 book

Small Data: The Tiny Clues That Uncover Huge Trends
- Author: Martin Lindstrom
- Language: English
- Publisher: St. Martins
- Publication place: United States
- ISBN: 978-1-250-08068-4

Small Data: the Tiny Clues that Uncover Huge Trends is Martin Lindstrom's seventh book. It chronicles his work as a branding expert, working with consumers across the world to better understand their behavior. The theory behind the book is that businesses can better create products and services based on observing consumer behavior in their homes, as opposed to relying solely on big data.

== Content ==
The book is based on a several year period of consumer studies for major corporations across the globe. It features case studies of the author's work interviewing consumers in their homes and using his observations to create hypotheses as to why they use products the way that they do.

== Public reception ==
The book was a New York Times Bestseller upon release and was positively reviewed on several websites, Including Entrepreneur and Forbes. In 2016, it was named a Best Business Book by strategy+business and one of Inc. Magazine's Best Sales and Marketing books.
