= Kogan Page =

British academic publisher of business-related books

- Founded: 1967
- Founder: Philip Kogan and Terry Page
- Country of origin: United Kingdom
- Headquarters location: London
- Distribution: Wiley Distribution (UK); Ingram Publishers Services (US)
- Publication types: Books
- Nonfiction topics: Business
- Official website: koganpage.com

Kogan Page started as an independent publishing company founded in 1967 and headquartered in London, with branches in New York and New Delhi. Kogan Page specialises in business books and digital content, with over 1,000 titles published in key subject areas.

Hachette UK announced the acquisition of Kogan Page on 1st May 2026. Following the acquisition, Kogan Page is now part of the John Murray Group and continues to operate as a distinct publishing brand within the division, maintaining its market-leading focus while benefiting from Hachette’s global distribution, marketing capabilities, and technological infrastructure.

Prior to the acquisition, the company's Managing Director was Helen Kogan and the publishing house was already home to a number of authors. In 2007, Kogan Page's founder, Philip Kogan, was recognised with an IPG Lifetime Achievement Award. Kogan died from pneumonia on 24 December 2022, at the age of 92.

== Publishing areas and partners ==
The company operates internationally and publishes in eight key areas: accounting, finance and banking; business and management; digital and technology; human resources, learning and development; marketing and communications; risk and compliance; skills, careers and employability; logistics, supply chains and operations. Kogan Page's publishing partners include the Chartered Institute of Personnel and Development, the Society for Human Resource Management (SHRM), the Chartered Institute of Public Relations, the Institute of Practitioners in Advertising, the Chartered Institute of Logistics and Transport, The Daily Telegraph, Accenture and the Trade Union Congress.

== Notable authors ==
Notable published authors include:

- Anne Boden
- Mark Gallagher
- Julia Hobsbawm
- Norman Pickavance
- Martin Lindstrom
