= Jon Bond =

American businessperson (born 1957)

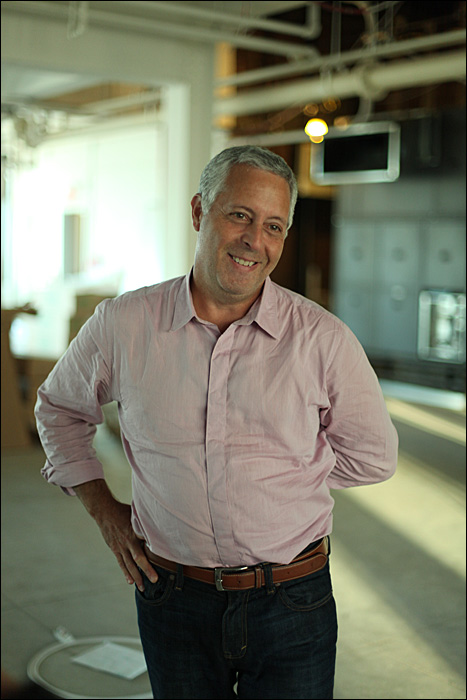
- Born: 1957 (age 68–69)
- Education: Washington University in St. Louis
- Occupations: Advertising executive; author; entrepreneur
- Spouse: Separated from Rebecca Bond

Jon Bond (born 1957) is an advertising executive, author and entrepreneur in New York City.

== Career ==
In 1987 Jon Bond co-founded Kirshenbaum Bond + Partners, a New York City advertising agency that used guerilla marketing techniques including sidewalk advertising and popup stores. The firm became the largest independently held agency in the United States, with clients including BMW, Target, Citi, Capital One, Tommy Hilfiger, Victoria's Secret, Verizon, AT&T, Snapple, and Delta Air Lines. At the time of its sale to MDC Partners in 2009, the firm had billings of $1BB. New York Magazine profiled Kirshenbaum + Bond in 1987, two months after its creation, the firm was featured in a 2005 episode of Paris Hilton and Nicole Richie's The Simple Life, and it was referenced in the 2007 film Perfect Stranger.

In 1996, Bond went on to co-found iballs, a digital media agencies, which was sold to Avenue A, which was then acquired by Microsoft. In 1997, Bond published Under the Radar, co-written with colleague Richard Kirshenbaum. The book was translated into five languages.

In 2011, he became the CEO of Big Fuel Communications, a marketing, content distribution, and social media company with clients including GM, Gatorade, T-Mobile, McDonald's, Budweiser, and Yahoo!. The company was acquired by Publicis in 2012. As of 2019, Bond was the "Chief Tomorroist" at Tomorro LLC, a company that provides financial and strategic advice.

Following the Sandy Hook Elementary School shooting in December 2012, he and his wife, Rebecca, founded Evolve, an organization intended to facilitate dialogue between opposing sides of the debate over gun ownership.

Bond is an advisor for Appinions Inc., DataXu, Metamorphic Ventures, and Smarterer, Inc. He has served as a board member of the AAAA (American Association of Advertising Agencies), Ad Council, and AdWeek, and was the chairman of the board of Worldwide Partners, the world's largest network of independent ad agencies. He was named #4 in Adweek's "Agency Executive of the Decade" in 2010.

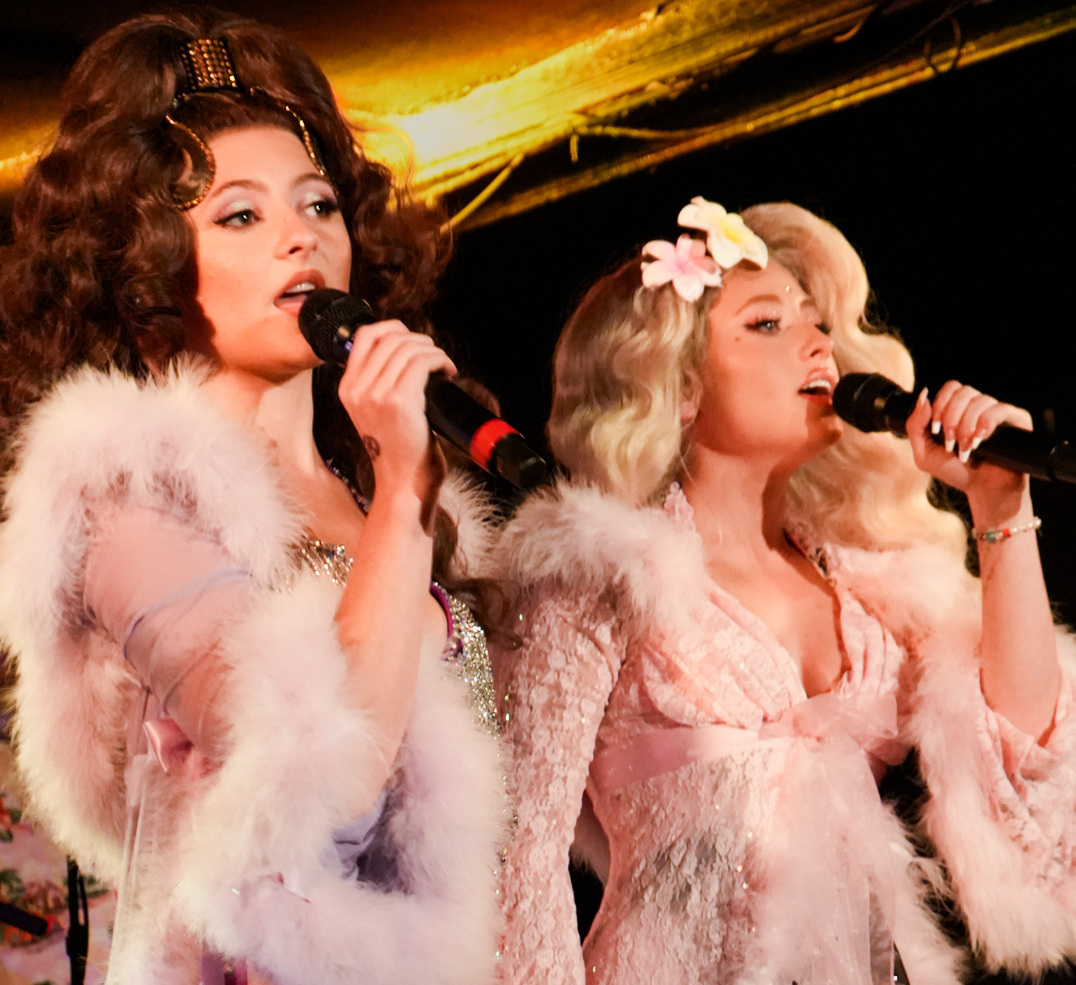
Daughters Olivia and Remy performing in Chicago, June 2025

== Personal life ==
He has five children from two marriages, two daughters and three sons, including Olivia Violet, and singer-songwriter Remy. The sisters appeared on season 6 of MasterChef Junior.
