= Jennifer Fitzgerald =

American CEO

- Occupation: CEO of Policygenius

Jennifer Fitzgerald is an American CEO and co-founder of an online insurance business, Policygenius.

== Early life ==
Fitzgerald was born in the Philippines, where her father was stationed in the Air Force. Fitzgerald would later move with her family to Dayton, Ohio. After living in Ohio for two years, the family moved to Biloxi Mississippi, then to Albuquerque, New Mexico and eventually to San Antonio, Texas. After her father retiring from the military, the family moved again to West Virginia when Fitzgerald was 14 years old. Fitzgerald went to Graham High School in Bluefield, Virginia and was a Peace Corps volunteer for the World Bank. She later graduated from Florida State University, with a double major in Political Science and International Affairs. The ambitious Fitzgerald wanted a 'hard reset on her career'. Moving away from the world of international policy and international development Fitzgerald wanted to enter the business world and attended Columbia Law School.

== Career ==
Fitzgerald started her career at McKinsey & Company as a consultant in 2008. In 2014, Fitzgerald co-founded Policygenius; an online marketplace for insurance that lets consumers compare rates and learn everything they need to know to make informed decisions about their financial future. At Policygenius, she secured $52 million in venture capital, making her one of four women in fintech to raise over $50 million.

In 2018 and 2019, Fitzgerald was named to the Inc.'s Female Founders 100. In 2019, she was named Ernst & Young LLP (EY) Entrepreneur of the Year New York.
