= Martin Lindstrom =

American business writer

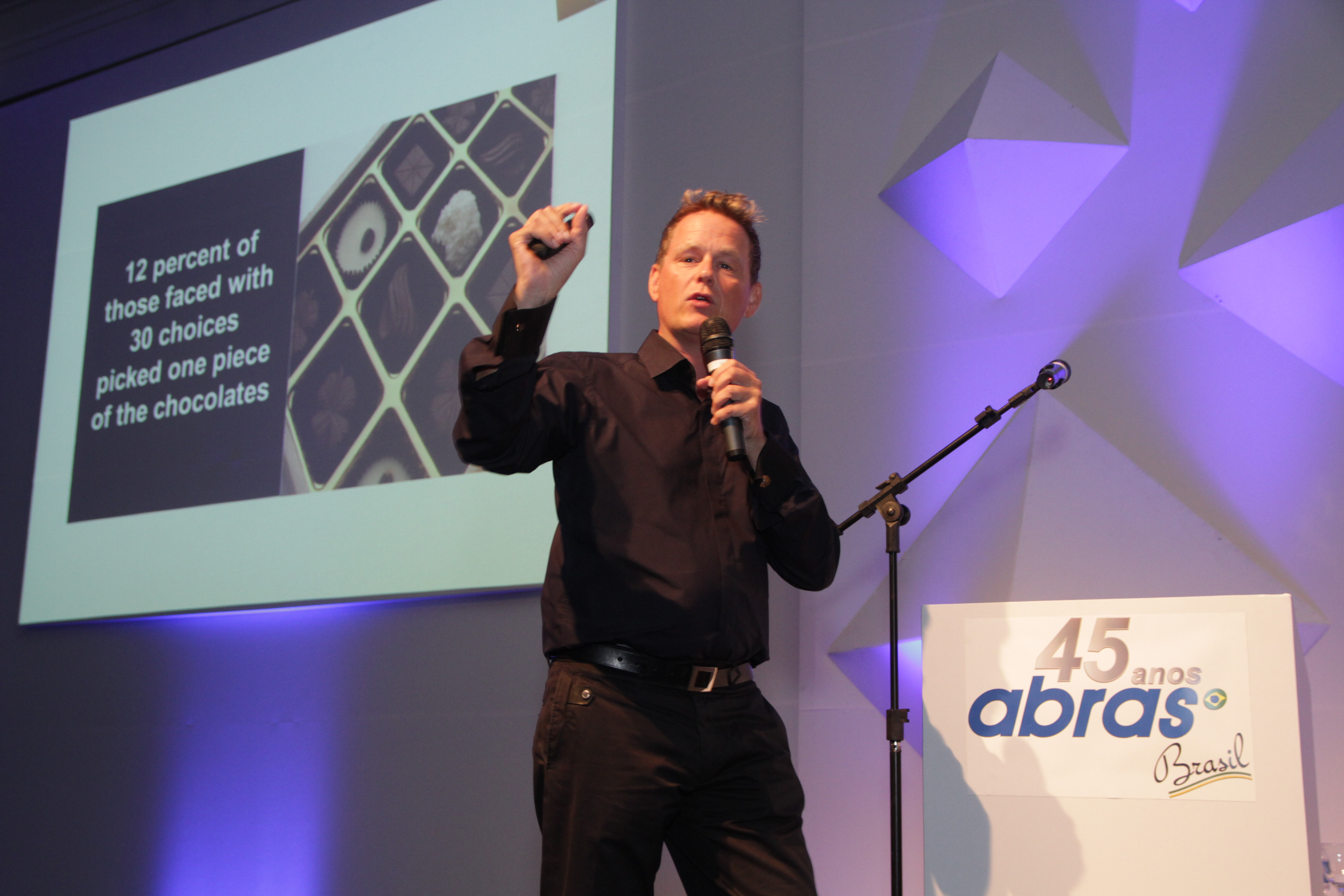
- Martin Lindstrom, palestrante internacional da 47ª Convenção ABRAS
- Occupations: Author, speaker, branding expert
- Notable work: Small Data: The Tiny Clues that Uncover Huge Trends; Buyology - Truth and Lies About Why We Buy; The Ministry of Common Sense

Martin Lindstrom (Lindstrøm) is a Danish author and Time magazine Influential 100 Honoree. He has written eight books including Small Data: The Tiny Clues that Uncover Huge Trends, Buyology – Truth and Lies About Why We Buy, Brandwashed – Tricks Companies Use to Manipulate Our Minds and Persuade Us to Buy, his first title written for consumers, for which Lindstrom conducted a $3 million word-of-mouth marketing experiment, and 2021 released The Ministry of Common Sense. Brandwashed was inspired by the 2009 film, The Joneses – to study the effects of social influence on purchasing decisions.

In 2011, Lindstrom appeared in the Morgan Spurlock (Super Size Me) movie documentary The Greatest Movie Ever Sold and on America's Next Top Model. Thinkers50 included him as number 18 on their list of the 2015 top 50 management thinkers in the world and included him in their updated lists for 2017.

Lindstrom is a columnist for Fast Company, TIME magazine and Harvard Business Review and frequently contributes to NBC's Today show.

== Buyology ==
In Buyology – Truth and Lies About Why We Buy, Lindstrom analyzes what makes people buy in a world which is cluttered with messages like advertisements, slogans, jingle, and celebrity endorsements. Through a study of the human psyche, he discusses the subconscious mind and how it plays a major role in deciding what the buyer will buy. The author claims to have studied the behavior of 2,000 humans for three years.

== Small Data ==
Lindstrom spent time with 2,000 families in more than 77 countries to get clues to how they live. In Small Data: The Tiny Clues that Uncover Huge Trends Lindstrom discusses those trips, the process he uses to gather information, and the business decisions that information has led to. In 2016, it was named a Best Business Book by strategy+business and one of Inc. magazine's Best Sales and Marketing books.

== Ministry of Common Sense ==
In The Ministry of Common Sense, Lindstrom reflects how organizations and brands focus on internal politics and processes and do not pay much attention on the end-user. The book is published in 58 languages.

== Bibliography ==
- The Ministry of Common Sense: How to Eliminate Bureaucratic Red Tape, Bad Excuses and Corporate BS (Houghton Mifflin Harcourt).
- Small Data: The Tiny Clues that Uncover Huge Trends (St. Martin's Press).
- Brandwashed - Tricks Companies Use to Manipulate Our Minds and Persuade Us to Buy (Crown Publications).
- Buyology - Truth and Lies About Why We Buy (Doubleday Business).
- BRAND sense - Building Powerful Brands Through Touch, Taste, Smell, Sight & Sound (Free Press).
- BRANDchild- Insights into the Minds of Today's Global Kids: Understanding Their Relationship with Brands (Kogan Page).
- Clicks, Bricks & Brands (Kogan Page).
- Brand Building On The Internet (Kogan Page).
