= Netomi =

American Artificial Intelligence Company

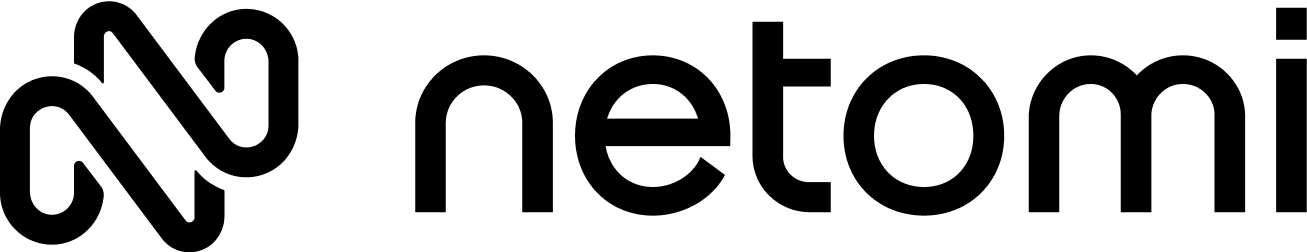
- Website type: Private company
- Founded: May 2015; 11 years ago
- Headquarters: San Francisco, California
- Founder: Puneet Mehta
- CEO: Puneet Mehta
- Industry: Artificial intelligence
- Website: netomi.com

Netomi, formerly msg.ai, is an American artificial intelligence company and developer of chatbot technologies.

== History ==
Netomi was founded in May 2015 by Puneet Mehta as msg.ai. Msg.ai worked with Sony Pictures to launch a chat bot on Facebook Messenger for the 2015 film Goosebumps and subsequently joined Y Combinator as a member of the Winter 2016 class. Later that year and in 2017, msg.ai completed two rounds of seed funding led by Y Combinator and Index Ventures.

In 2018, the company changed its name to Netomi. In 2019, the company raised $14.7 million in a Series A funding round also led by Index Ventures. In 2021, the company raised $30 million in a Series B funding round led by WndrCo LLC. In 2026, the company raised $110 million in a Series C funding round led by Accenture Ventures, with participation from Adobe Ventures, WndrCo, SLW, NAVER Ventures, Metis Strategy, and Fin Capital.
