= Buyology =

2008 book by Martin Lindstrom

Buyology: Truth and Lies About Why We Buy
- Book Cover
- Author: Martin Lindstrom
- Language: English
- Subject: Marketing, Business, Advertising, Promotion, science of shopping
- Genre: Nonfiction
- Publisher: Doubleday
- Publication date: 2008
- Publication place: United States
- Media type: Print, Hardcover
- Pages: 256
- ISBN: 978-0-385-52388-2
- OCLC: 192048160
- Dewey Decimal: 658.8/34 22
- LC Class: HF5415.12615 .L56 2008

Buyology: Truth and Lies About Why We Buy (2008) is a non-fiction book by Martin Lindstrom, in which he analyzes what makes people buy. The author attempts to identify the factors that influence buyers' decisions in a world cluttered with messages such as advertisements, slogans, jingle and celebrity endorsements. Lindstrom, through a study of the human psyche, explains the subconscious mind and its role in deciding what the buyer will buy. Lindstrom debunks some myths about advertising and promotion. Time named Lindstrom as one of the world's 100 most influential people because of his book.

== Content ==
Buyology is claimed to be a result of the author’s three year neuromarketing study on 2,081 people to identify the effect of brands, logos, commercials, advertisements and products on them. The study was funded by seven corporations, including GlaxoSmithKline, Hakuhodo, Fremantle - and Martin Lindstrom. The study evaluates the effectiveness of logos, product placement and subliminal advertising, the influence of our senses and the correlation between religion and branding.
