= Norman Pickavance =

English advisor, author, activist

Norman Pickavance is an advisor, author and activist, addressing issues at the intersection of business and society, leading research, innovation and collaborative action. He has advised business, society and political leaders, plus various CEO's, Chairs and All Party Parliamentary Groups on strategy & policy, trust & governance, skills & employment, pay & fairness, mental health, modern slavery and social mobility matters. Pickavance recently Chaired a Task Force into the Future of the Retail Industry in the UK on behalf of the Fabian Society. His first book, The Reconnected Leader, was published by Kogan Page in December 2014. He is co-founder of a Social Impact Initiative - The Financial Inclusion Alliance - addressing the challenges facing Britain's Working Poor.

== Education ==
Pickavance graduated from the University of Liverpool with a Bachelor of Law Honours degree in 1985.

== Career ==
Pickavance started his career in 1986 with Diageo, before joining Fujitsu in 1990. He joined Perot Systems in 1995 as European HR director, and after its purchase and intergeneration by Dell in 1999, in 2000 joined Marconi Communications. In 2003 he was appointed Corporate Services Director at Northern Foods, and in 2007 Group HR and Communications Director at Morrisons. In 2012 he became a Non Executive Director at HMRC and in 2013 at The Serious Fraud Office. In 2014 he joined Accounting Firm Grant Thornton to develop their Vibrant Economy Strategy, connecting Business and Society through innovation and the joint development of sustainable strategies. Pickavance has also been a Non Executive Director with the National Health Service and Founded and Chaired an award-winning Social Enterprise, which helped over 500 Homeless and excluded people to get their lives back through structured work and specialist support.

Identified in 2011 as one of the most influential HR Directors in Europe, after leaving Morrisons in 2012 Pickavance was a on executive director for HM Revenue and Customs (2013–2014).

Pickavance is currently co-founder of The Financial Inclusion Alliance - A Social Impact Venture. He previously advised Tomorrow's Company The BluePrint for Better Business Pickavance is known for being a Campaigner and Activist promoting an ethical approach to business and in helping people who are excluded or exploited in society.

== Awards ==
- 'Ethical Restaurant of the Year Award' for Create (2013)'
- 'Business in the Community UK Award' for Talent & Skills Leadership (2012)
- 'Chartered Institute Award' for Organisation Learning (2011)
- Prime Minister David Cameron's 'Big Society Award (2011)

== Personal life ==
Pickavance lists Writing. Social Enterprise, Photography and Walking, as his interests.
