= David Art Wales =

Australian entrepreneur and artist (born 1964)

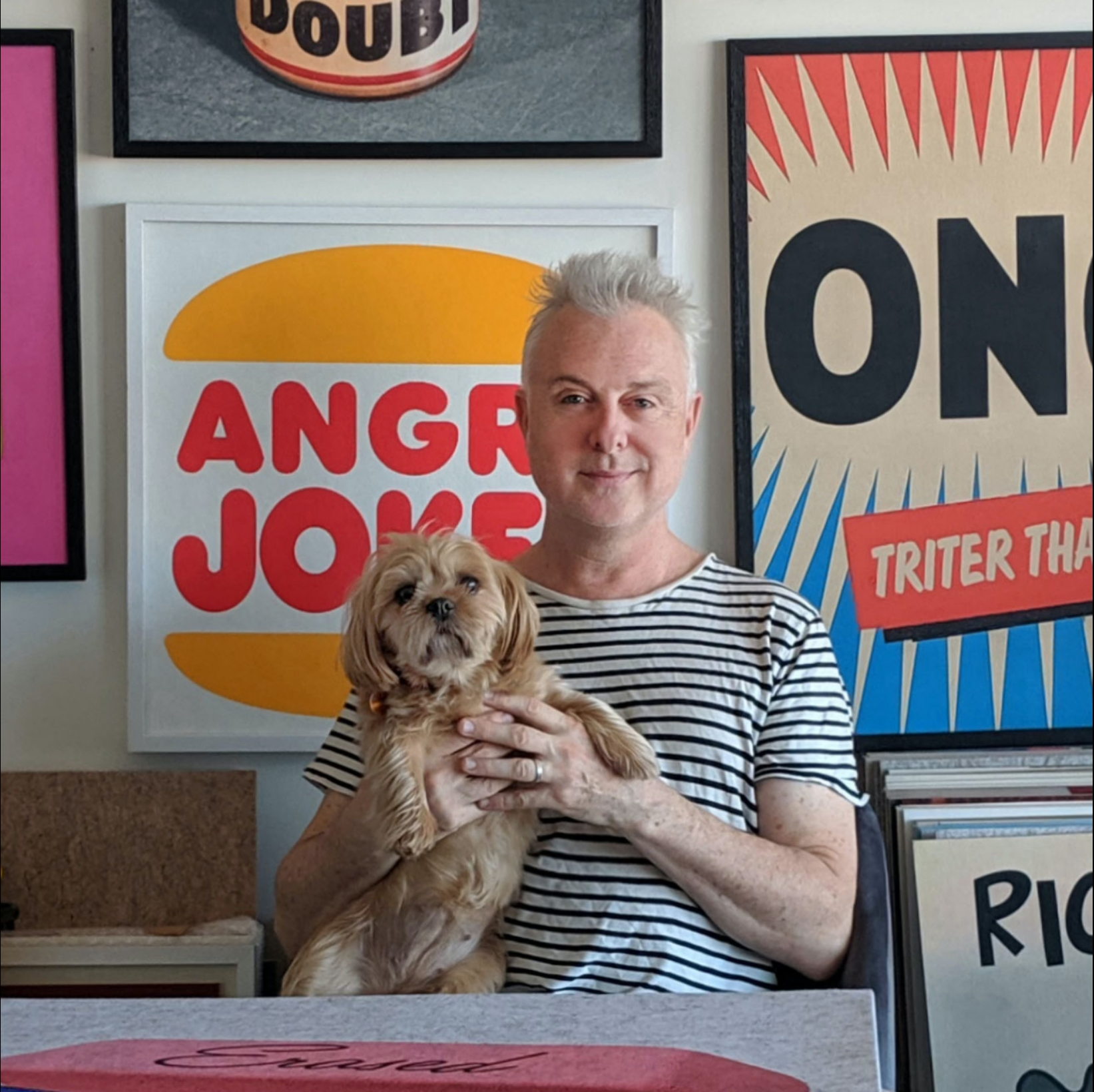
David Art Wales in his Sydney studio, 2019

David Art Wales (born 6 February 1964, Sydney) is an Australian entrepreneur and artist best known for creating satirical cult figure Guru Adrian. He has been involved in collaborations with artist Keith Haring and filmmaker Morgan Spurlock.

Wales has been called "the father of the Naughties" in relation to his role as founder of Project Naughtie, a campaign to name the decade of 2000–2009 the "Naughties".

== 1980s ==
At the age of nineteen, Wales launched his first business, Nice Enterprises, described as "the world's first mail order flattery service." A year later, he co-published Fatplastiscene magazine, the first issue of which is in the collection of the National Gallery of Australia. In 1986 Wales became a host of the ABC TV show Edge of the Wedge.

During the 1980s he was a frequent contributor to Australian radio station Triple J, providing commentary on pop-cultural issues, including a live report from Berlin as the Berlin Wall fell, and a comic strip featuring Guru Adrian for the station's fanzine, Alan.

In New York in 1987, Wales collaborated with artist Keith Haring on a piece called No Body. In 2020 he told the South Sydney Herald, "My Guru Adrian character had no body, just a head, so Keith drew him a body."

== 1990s ==
Wales moved to New York to paint in 1989 and spent the 1990s showing at various Manhattan and Australian galleries, including Roslyn Oxley 9 and the Australian Consulate-General in New York. During this time he also worked on content creation projects for MTV, Fox and Disney. During the 90s Hanna Barbera, Fox and MTV have all optioned Guru Adrian character with a view to creating a TV series, but each time the project was shelved.

In 1998 Wales and Australian dancer Catherine Hourihan launched the Red Vixen Burlesque, a popular downtown off-Broadway attraction now seen as an early progenitor of the neo-burlesque movement.

== Naughties ==
In 1999 Wales initiated Project Naughtie, a grassroots campaign to name the 2000s decade the "Naughties". A December 2009 newspaper article referred to Wales as the "father of the Noughties".

That year Wales became Cultural Forecaster for Toyota, tracking and predicting trends for the automaker's design division. In 2000 he launched the creative consultancy Ministry of Culture.

In 2008, Wales and filmmaker Morgan Spurlock launched the B2B website Cinelan, described by The Hollywood Reporter as a "film content publisher."

More recently, Ministry of Culture has created a viral campaign claiming to resurrect an ancient Welsh temperance movement called Prudent Boozers.

== 2000–present ==
After relocating from New York to Sydney, Australia in 2018, Wales created a series of 200 prints on acoustic felt that documented how he felt about returning home after three decades. The resulting show, How I Felt, was well received, with art critic Andrew Frost writing, "Wales has a pure pop sensibility. He uses the iconography of popular culture in a way that’s affectionate and nostalgic, but also as a way to create a reflection of his own doubts and uncertainty."

In 2019, Wales created BuyMyLife, a digital art project devised as a way to sell his life in New York City. For US$11,000 anyone could buy a package consisting of the lease to the artist's Manhattan apartment, his furniture, art materials, clothing, books, art collection, and entree to his social group – specifically, lunch with three of Wales's closest friends at Eisenberg's Sandwich Shop, where he frequently ate. The BuyMyLife site describes the package as "a piece of art you can live in" and "a set of tools that will give you a 30-year head start on becoming a New Yorker," with potential buyers being "anyone who loves the dioramas at the Museum of Natural History and longs to live in one." BuyMyLife sold in early 2021.

Wales spent the 2020 COVID-19 lockdown in Sydney creating 100 prints on acoustic felt for a show called Going Viral, at Duckrabbit art space. The works depict the COVID-19 molecule as an invading alien or exotic plant. Since galleries were closed during lockdown, Wales hung the show in the gallery's street-facing window and held a socially-distant opening, with attendees wearing pool noodles under their arms to keep them 1.5 metres apart. Going Viral prompted a Sydney newspaper to dub Wales "the Warhol of Darlo" (Darlo is short for Darlinghurst, the Sydney suburb where Wales lives and works). The artist described the Going Viral prints as "positive mementos of a dark period in history that we’ve weathered together."
