= ServiceNow =

American technology company

ServiceNow, Inc.

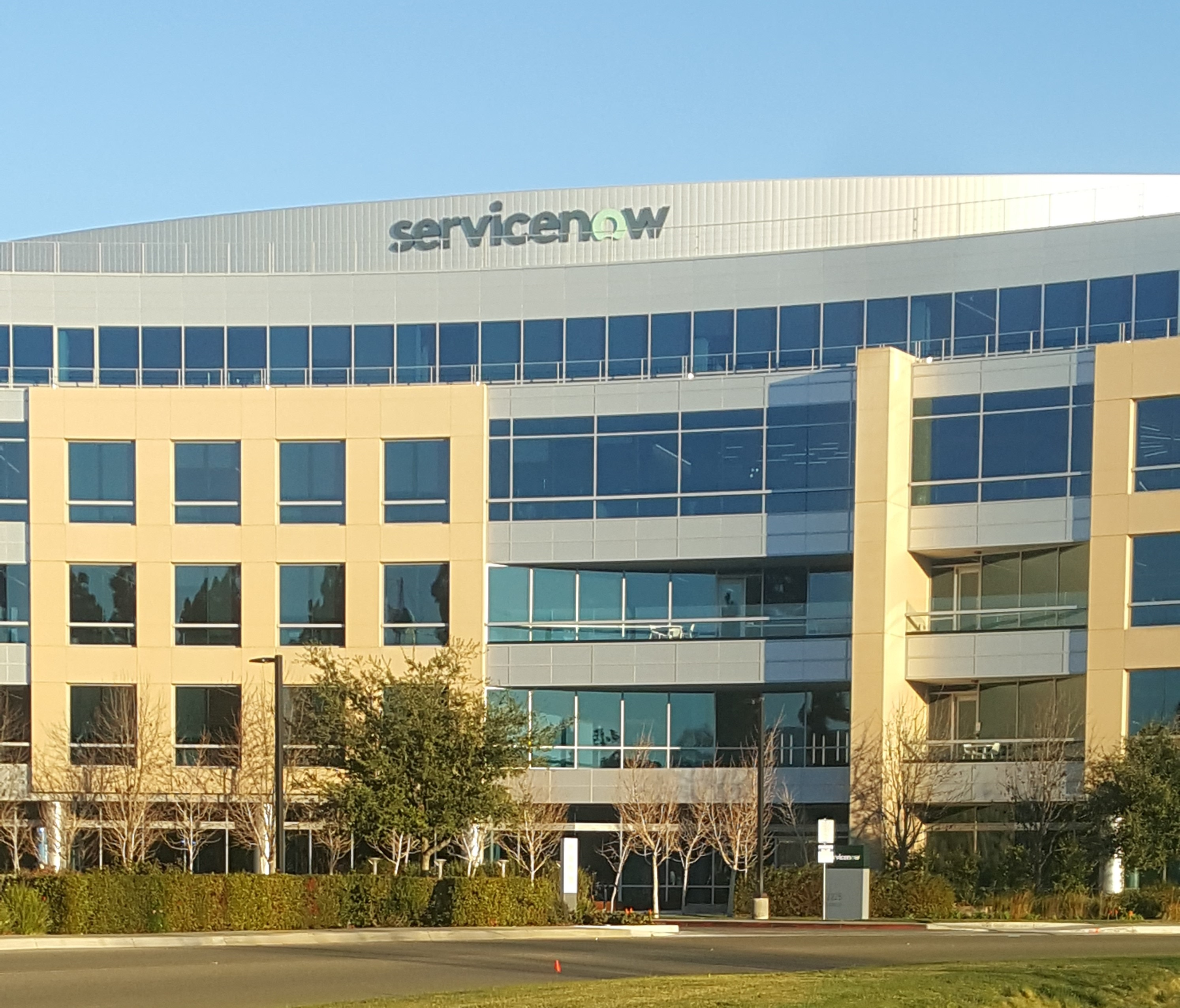
- Headquarters in Santa Clara, California
- Formerly: Glidesoft (2003–2006)
- Type: Public
- Traded as: NYSE: NOW; S&P 100 component; S&P 500 component
- Industry: Enterprise software
- Founded: November 5, 2003; 23 years ago
- Founders: Fred Luddy
- Headquarters: Santa Clara, California, U.S.
- Area served: Worldwide
- Key people: Bill McDermott (CEO); Fred Luddy (chairman)
- Services: Cloud computing; IT service management
- Revenue: ▲US$13.28 billion (2025)
- Operating income: ▲US$1.824 billion (2025)
- Net income: ▲US$1.748 billion (2025)
- Total assets: ▲US$26.04 billion (2025)
- Total equity: ▲US$12.96 billion (2025)
- Number of employees: 29,187 (2025)
- Website: servicenow.com

ServiceNow, Inc. is an American software company that supplies cloud computing platforms for the creation and management of automated business workflows. The company was founded in Santa Clara, California, United States, in 2003 by Fred Luddy. It is listed on the New York Stock Exchange and is a constituent of the S&P 100 and S&P 500 indices.

== History ==
ServiceNow was founded as Glidesoft, Inc. in 2003 by Fred Luddy, and later incorporated in California in 2004. Luddy had previously served as chief technology officer (CTO) for Peregrine Systems, an enterprise software company based in San Diego, until 2002. In founding the company, Luddy intended to provide the same services previously available from the then defunct Peregrine Systems.

Luddy was the only employee until mid-2005 when US$2.5 million in venture financing from JMI Equity allowed Glidesoft to hire five additional people. In 2006, the company changed its name to Service-Now.com. In 2007, ServiceNow reported an annual revenue of US$13 million and opened its first Silicon Valley office, in San Jose. 2007 was also the first year that the company "went cash flow positive".

As of January 2011, the company had 275 employees in its San Diego, Chicago, New York, Atlanta, London and Frankfurt offices, as well as a partnership with Accenture who had more than 100 ServiceNow consultants. At this time, the company was sometimes known as "Service-now". By April 2011, the company had named Frank Slootman as chief executive officer.

In June 2012, ServiceNow became a publicly traded company following a US$210 million IPO. Shortly thereafter, the company relocated its headquarters from San Diego to Santa Clara, California. It was taken public by Morgan Stanley one month after it took Facebook public.

In October 2019, the company announced that CEO John Donahoe would be succeeded by Bill McDermott, formerly CEO of SAP SE at the end of the calendar year. In January 2020, Bill appointed Gina Mastantuono as Chief Financial Officer. Under her leadership, ServiceNow crossed $10 billion in revenue in 2024 and grew its subscription revenue at a 26% compound annual growth rate from 2020 to 2024, earning the company a spot on the Fortune 500 list. Mastantuono was named President while continuing as CFO in 2025.

In May 2023, Nvidia announced a partnership with ServiceNow to include AI services in help desk software for corporations. As of December 2023, the number of employees in ServiceNow was estimated to be around 23,000.

In 2024, the platform was reported to have leaked potentially highly confidential data from the "knowledge base" module of over a thousand corporate users due to a misconfiguration of its access control settings. In October 2024, the company announced its plans to invest $1.5 billion in the UK. Its data centers there are located in the cities of London and Newport, Wales. In September 2025, ServiceNow announced that it was opening a new office in West Palm Beach, Florida. In January 2026, the company announced partnerships with Anthropic and OpenAI to add those companies' large language models into its AI platform to add agentic AI features.

In 2026, ServiceNow cut jobs in the United States, the United Kingdom and India under a restructuring program. Severance and related costs reached $167 million over the first nine months of the year, $87 million of it in the third quarter, up from $53 million and $24 million a year earlier. According to ServiceNow, the program was meant to make its workforce more efficient through artificial intelligence while the company kept investing in talent in areas it called strategic, and it said the program should be largely complete during 2026. Deferred compensation owed to certain key employees who arrived through ServiceNow's 2026 acquisitions reached $211 million over the same nine months, carried as a prepaid asset and written off against research and development costs. On October 26, 2026, the board approved awards to company leaders with a combined target value of about $127 million, $50 million of it for chief executive Bill McDermott, vesting over 2027 to 2029.

=== Acquisitions ===
- July 2013: Mirror42, an Amsterdam-based software developer
- July 2014: Neebula Systems, an Israeli cloud computing tools company
- February 2015: Intréis
- June 2016: Brightpoint Security
- January 2017: Machine learning startup DxContinuum
- October 2017: San Diego human-centered design firm Telepathy; the acquisition doubled the size of ServiceNow's internal design agency, the Design Experience Organization
- October 2017: SkyGiraffe, an enterprise mobility company backed by Microsoft Ventures. SkyGiraffe formed the basis for ServiceNow's Mobile Platform, released in March 2019.
- April 2018: VendorHawk, a software-as-a-service management company
- May 2018: AI startup Parlo
- October 2018: Data analytics company, FriendlyData
- May 2019: Appsee Ltd., an in-app mobile analytics startup
- November 2019: Fairchild Resiliency Systems
- January 2020: Loom Systems, Passage AI, and Attivio
- June 2020: Sweagle
- November 2020: Element AI
- March 2021: Intellibot
- May 2021: Lightstep
- August 2021: Swarm64 and Mapwize
- October 2021: Gekkobrain
- June 2022: Hitch
- October 2022: Era Software
- July 2023: AI-powered platform G2K
- December 2023: UltimateSuite
- March 2024: 4Industry
- July 2024: Raytion GmbH
- November 2024: Mission Secure
- January 2025: Cuein AI
- February 2025: Quality 360°
- March 2025: Moveworks
- April 2025: Logik
- May 2025: Data.World
- December 2025: Veza
- December 2025: Armis
- February 2026: Pyramid Analytics
- March 2025: Traceloop
- April 2026: Armis
- July 2026: Ai.Work
- September 2026: Sweep

== Platform ==
ServiceNow is a platform-as-a-service, that is designed to support IT service management and help desk functionality with automated workflows. Their fee model was based on a cost per user (seat) per month, with that cost ranging down from US$100.

The platform is packaged into different suites of applications called "modules", which are tailored to various business processes. Some of these areas include governance, risk management, and compliance, audit, business continuity planning, disaster recovery, vendor management, and environmental, social, and corporate governance. A commonly referred to benefit of the platform is that many of these modules are interconnected, such as the IRM suite (Integrated Risk Management), which will automatically create issues and assign tickets based on various risk and audit findings, findings that can be found through the manual or automated performance of different activities such as evidence requests. There is also a data and information visualization report creator called Performance Analytics.

The ServiceNow script is written in JavaScript, with database queries being made using a proprietary object-oriented API called Glide. In July 2023, the company released generative AI summarization and text-to-code features.

== Finances ==
	2016	2017	2018	2019	2020	2021	2022	2023	2024	2025
Total revenue (USD bn)	1.39	1.93	2.61	3.46	4.52	5.9	7.24	8.97	10.98	13.28
Operating profit (USD bn)	-0.15	-0.01	-0.04	0.04	0.20	0.26	0.36	0.76	1.4	2.0
Net profit (USD bn)	-0.45	-0.15	-0.03	0.63	0.12	0.23	0.33	1.73	1.42	1.75
Total assets (USD bn)	2.03	3.4	3.88	6.02	8.72	10.8	13.3	17.39	20.38	26.04
Total equity (USD bn)	0.39	0.58	1.11	2.13	2.83	3.7	5.03	7.63	9.61	12.96

== See also ==
- IT service management
- DevOps
- BMC Software
- ERP software
