= 1st Critics' Choice Documentary Awards =

Critics' Choice Documentary Awards 2018

- Date: November 3, 2016
- Site: BRIC, Brooklyn, New York, United States
- Official website: www.criticschoice.com

The 1st Critics' Choice Documentary Awards were presented on November 3, 2016 at the BRIC House in Brooklyn, New York, honoring the finest achievements in documentary filmmaking and non-fiction television. This was the inaugural ceremony for these awards, presented by the Critics Choice Association. The nominees were announced on October 10, 2016.

== Winners and nominees ==
Best Documentary Feature: O.J.: Made in America; 13th; Cameraperson; Fire at Sea; Gleason; Life, Animated; Tickled; Tower; Weiner; The Witness	Best Direction for a Documentary Feature: Ezra Edelman – O.J.: Made in America; Ron Howard – The Beatles: Eight Days a Week; Kirsten Johnson – Cameraperson; Keith Maitland – Tower; Clay Tweel – Gleason; Roger Ross Williams – Life, Animated
Best Documentary Feature (TV/Streaming): 13th; Fantastic Lies; Amanda Knox; Audrie & Daisy; Before the Flood; Holy Hell; Into the Inferno; Jim: The James Foley Story; Mapplethorpe: Look at the Pictures; Rats	Best Direction (TV/Streaming): Ava DuVernay – 13th; Fenton Bailey and Randy Barbato – Mapplethorpe: Look at the Pictures; Rod Blackhurst and Brian McGinn – Amanda Knox; Werner Herzog – Into the Inferno; Morgan Spurlock – Rats; Fisher Stevens – Before the Flood
Best First Documentary Feature: Josh Kriegman and Elyse Steinberg – Weiner; Otto Bell – The Eagle Huntress; David Farrier and Dylan Reeve – Tickled; Adam Irving – Off the Rails; James D. Solomon – The Witness; Nanfu Wang – Hooligan Sparrow	Best Political Documentary: 13th; O.J.: Made in America; Audrie & Daisy; Newtown; Weiner; Zero Days
Best First Feature (TV Streaming): Everything is Copy; Southwest of Salem: The Story of the San Antonio Four; Holy Hell; Mavis!; My Beautiful Broken Brain; Team Foxcatcher	Best Limited Documentary Series: O.J.: Made in America; The Circus: Inside the Greatest Political Show on Earth; The Eighties; The Hunt; Jackie Robinson; Soundbreaking: Stories From the Cutting Edge of Recorded Music
Best Ongoing Documentary Series: 30 for 30; Frontline; Last Chance U; Morgan Spurlock Inside Man; POV; This Is Life with Lisa Ling	Best Sports Documentary: O.J.: Made in America; Fantastic Lies; Dark Horse; The Eagle Huntress; Gleason; Jackie Robinson; Keepers of the Game
Best Music Documentary: The Beatles: Eight Days a Week; Gimme Danger; Miss Sharon Jones!; The Music of Strangers; Presenting Princess Shaw; We Are X	Most Innovative Documentary: Tower; Cameraperson; Kate Plays Christine; Life, Animated; Nuts; Under the Sun
Best Song in a Documentary: “I’m Still Here” – Miss Sharon Jones! – Written by Sharon Jones, Performed by Sharon Jones & the Dap-Kings; “Angel by the Wings” – The Eagle Huntress – Written and performed by Sia; “The Empty Chair” – Jim: The James Foley Story – Written by Sting and J. Ralph, Performed by Sting; “Flicker” – Audrie & Daisy – Written and performed by Tori Amos; “Hoping and Healing” – Gleason – Written and performed by Mike McCready; “Letters to the Free” – 13th – Written by Common, Karriem Riggins and Robert Glasper – Performed by Common featuring Bilal

== Films by multiple nominations and wins ==
The following films received multiple nominations:

Nominations	Film
5	O.J.: Made in America
5	13th
4	Gleason
3	Audrie & Daisy
3	Life, Animated
3	Cameraperson
3	The Eagle Huntress
3	Towe
3	Weiner
2	Holy Hell
2	Amanda Knox
2	Rats
2	The Witness
2	Into the Inferno
2	Mapplethorpe: Look at the Pictures
2	The Beatles: Eight Days a Week
2	Jim: The James Foley Story
2	Miss Sharon Jones!
2	Tickled
2	Jackie Robinson
2	Fantastic Lies
2	Before the Flood

The following films received multiple awards:

Wins	Film
4	O.J.: Made in America
3	13th

== See also ==
- 89th Academy Awards
- 69th Primetime Emmy Awards
