= Comic-Con Episode IV: A Fan's Hope =

- Theatrical release poster
- Directed by: Morgan Spurlock
- Written by: Jeremy Chilnick; Morgan Spurlock
- Produced by: Morgan Spurlock; Thomas Tull; Jeremy Chilnick; Matthew Galkin; Harry Knowles; Stan Lee
- Cinematography: Daniel Marracino
- Edited by: Tim K. Smith; Tova Goodman
- Music by: Jingle Punks
- Production companies: Thomas Tull Productions; Warrior Poets; NECA Films; POW! Entertainment; Mutant Enemy Productions
- Distributed by: Wrekin Hill Entertainment
- Release dates: September 10, 2011 (Toronto International Film Festival); March 2, 2012 (True/False Film Festival); April 5, 2012 (Santa Monica); April 6, 2012 (limited release)
- Running time: 88 minutes
- Country: United States
- Language: English

Comic-Con Episode IV: A Fan's Hope is a 2011 documentary film on San Diego Comic-Con, directed by Morgan Spurlock.

The film follows five subjects: aspiring comics artists Skip Harvey and Eric Henson; comic book dealer Chuck Rozanski, who attempts to sell a high-priced comic book; a group of costume designers led by Holly Conrad who enter the convention's cosplay competition; and fan James Darling, who plans to propose marriage to his girlfriend during one of the many events at the convention. The documentary also conducts brief interviews with comic book and Hollywood figures who share their experiences as fans and their feelings toward the event.

== Synopsis ==
The documentary explores the phenomenon of San Diego Comic-Con, which began as a fringe comic book convention for 500 fans. The event has grown into an annual pop culture event that influences every form of entertainment and is attended by over 140,000 people. The film follows the lives of five attendees as they prepare to attend the 2010 convention, which is characterized as "the ultimate geek mecca":

- Eric Henson and Skip Harvey: two aspiring illustrators who hope to find work by showing their artwork to publishers at the convention. Henson, who dreams of working one day for Marvel Comics, obtains a favorable portfolio review by the publisher Arch Enemy, which gives him work illustrating covers. Harvey, who tends bar at a sci-fi/fantasy/horror-themed bar, does not get work at the convention, but is encouraged to continue practicing his craft. He continues to run his bar while working on his graphic novel on the side.
- Holly Conrad: a costume designer and cosplayer who brings her creations to life in her garage. She hopes the costumes worn by her troupe, Suicide Mission, which are based on the video game Mass Effect, will win the convention's costume competition. The costumes, which include an alien named Grunt with animatronic eyes and mouth, win the Judges' Choice Award. She is later hired to create other costumes based on video games and as a wardrobe consultant on an upcoming Mass Effect feature film.
- Chuck Rozanski: owner of Mile High Comics, a Denver-based chain of comic book shops for the past 34 years. Rozanski is looking to sell a copy of Red Raven Comics #1 for $500,000 in order to pay off his debts. Although he does not sell the comic book, his booth at the convention generates more profit than last year's, allowing Mile High Comics to move into a new 65,000 sq foot warehouse.
- James Darling: a young fan who plans to propose to his girlfriend, Se Young Kang, at the convention. After acquiring a ring featuring a clock without hands to symbolize timelessness, he proposes her while at the microphone during a Q&A session with filmmaker Kevin Smith. She accepts.

The film also covers various aspects of the convention, such as discussion panels, the camaraderie among the attendees, and features one on one interviews with comics industry professionals such as Frank Miller, Seth Rogen, Eli Roth, Harry Knowles, Kevin Smith, and Matt Groening.

== Interviews ==
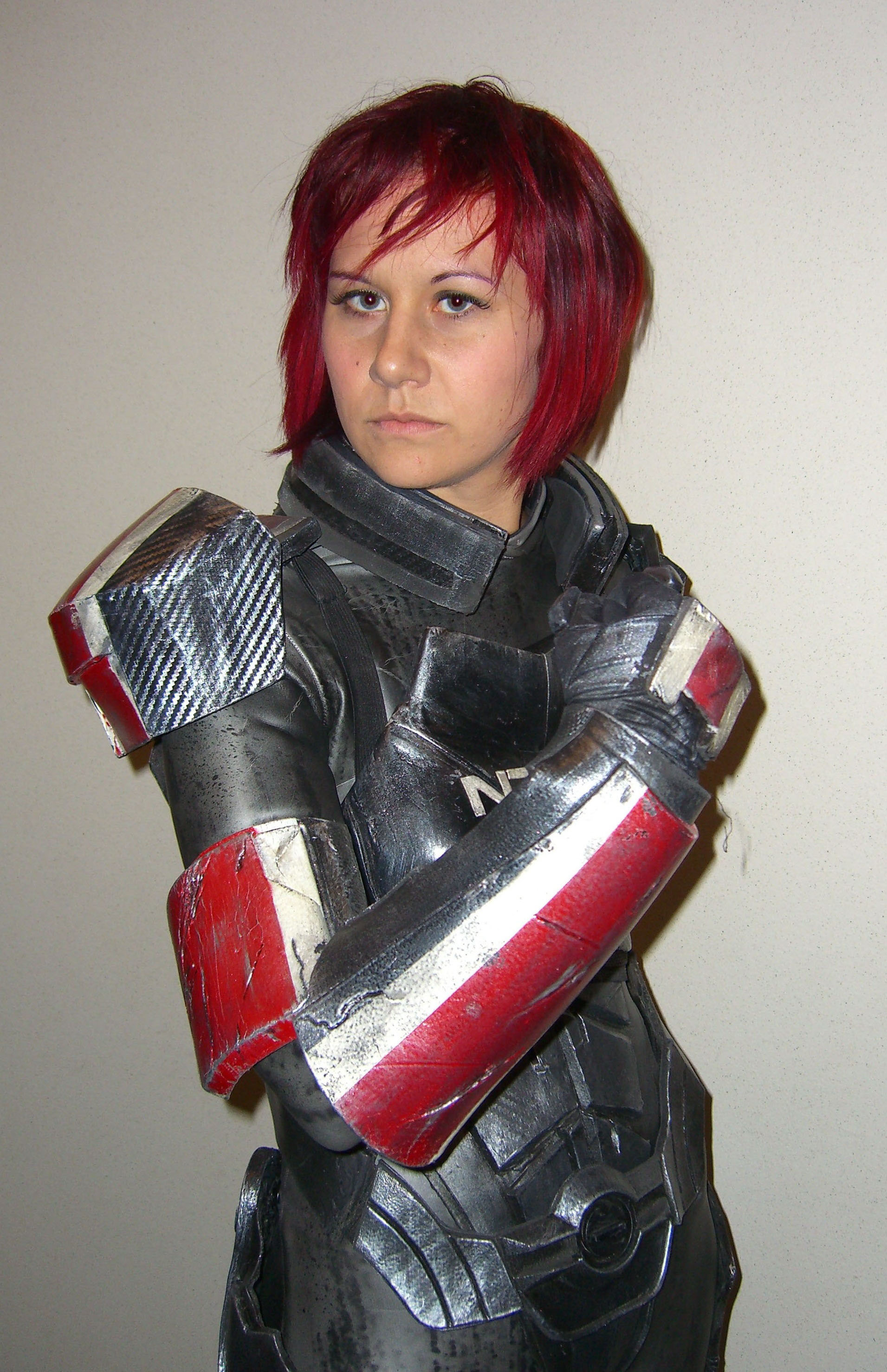
Holly Conrad's work in preparation for a cosplay competition is among the plotlines in the film.

- Jon Schnepp
- Joss Whedon
- Kevin Smith
- Eli Roth
- Harry Knowles
- Corey Feldman
- Jamison Newlander
- Tim Bradstreet
- Thomas Jane
- Todd McFarlane
- Robert Kirkman
- Frank Miller
- Joe Quesada
- Scott Mantz
- Marc Guggenheim
- Seth Green
- Olivia Wilde
- Joel McHale
- Stan Lee
- Kenneth Branagh
- Matt Fraction
- Grant Morrison
- Guillermo del Toro
- Steve Sansweet
- Seth Rogen
- Morgan Webb
- Lee Wochner
- Paul Scheer
- Henry Jenkins
- Edgar Wright
- Matt Groening
- Gerard Way

== Critical reception ==
On the review aggregator website Rotten Tomatoes, 82% of 56 critics' reviews are positive, with an average rating of 6.9/10. Metacritic, which uses a weighted average, assigned the film a score of 64 out of 100, based on 24 critics, indicating "generally favorable" reviews.
