= Edgar Church =

Comic collector and artist (1888–1978)

- Born: November 28, 1888; Plainville, Connecticut
- Died: May 1, 1978 (aged 89); Denver, Colorado
- Occupations: Artist, collector

Edgar Church (November 28, 1888 – May 1, 1978) was a comics collector and artist who worked independently and eventually for the telephone company in Colorado illustrating commercial telephone book advertisements, precursors to Yellow Pages advertisements.

Church kept thousands of miscellaneous periodicals in his Colorado home to use as references for his art. From these magazines he would clip images which he would store in one of hundreds of labeled boxes. The collection of comic books that he amassed, later known as the "Edgar Church collection" or the "Mile High collection", is the most famous and valuable comic book collection known to surface in the history of comic book collecting. The collection consisted of between 18,000 and 22,000 comic books, most of them in high quality grades, and was discovered and bought in 1977 by Chuck Rozanski of Mile High Comics. About 99% of it was later sold by him to various collectors. The collection is famed for holding the highest quality copies of many Golden Age comic books, including the best known copy of Action Comics #1 which is believed to be a 9.4 to a 9.6. The current owner has declined to have it graded.

Edgar Church was married twice and had one child with each of his wives. Church died in 1978 at age 89.
