= Variant cover =

Comic book issue printed with multiple covers, each with unique cover art

In comic books, a variant cover (sometimes variant edition) refers to an issue of a comic book printed with multiple covers, each with unique cover art. The first comic book marketed with a variant cover was the 1986 first issue of The Man of Steel, which featured two different covers by writer/artist John Byrne. Variant covers became more common during the "speculator boom" of the 1990s, when more collectors became interested in the storage and preservation of their comic books with the goal of future financial gain rather than reading the comics themselves.

According to an article by ZapKapow Comics, The Walking Dead #1 (originally published in 2003), currently holds the record for the single issue with the most variant covers at 253 distinct variants.

== History ==
Variant covers for The Man of Steel #1 (1986). Art by John Byrne.

The first comic book marketed with a variant cover was the 1986 first issue of The Man of Steel, which featured two different covers by writer/artist John Byrne. One featured a full shot of Superman ripping open the shirt comprising part of his civilian clothing to reveal the "S" emblem on his chest, along with a shot of the spaceship that brought him to Earth escaping Krypton. The other cover featured a closeup of Superman's chest as he rips open his shirt.

=== The speculator boom of the 1990s ===
In reaction to the boom, comic book publishers began to market specifically to the collectors' market. Knowing that many collectors are completists, buying, for example, every issue featuring a certain character, publishers began to produce comics with multiple covers, and completists and speculators alike bought them by the millions. The variants often depended on whether the copy was sold through the direct market or at a newsstand.

X-Men #1, from 1991, is the best-selling comic book of all time, with sales of over 8.1 million copies and nearly $7 million, according to a public proclamation by Guinness World Records at the 2010 San Diego Comic-Con. The sales figures were generated in part by publishing the issue with five different variant covers, designated #1A, #1B, #1C, #1D, and #1E. The first four covers show different characters from the book that form a single image when laid side by side, and a fifth, gatefold cover of that combined image, large numbers of which were purchased by retailers, who anticipated fans and speculators who would buy multiple copies in order to acquire a complete collection of the covers.

Not every issue with variant covers sold well, but that did not dissuade the publishers. Variant covers graced the covers of titles from Marvel, DC, Valiant, and Image, as well as numerous small-press publishers. In 1993, DC Comics shipped the first printing of Superman #75, featuring the climax of "The Death of Superman" storyline, in a black polybag with a Superman armband inside. Collectors who wanted to keep their copy pristine but also read the story either bought multiple copies or subsequent printings (which had the same cover but not the polybag and fan incentives). Likewise, second printings of other issues with "gimmick covers" typically shipped without the gimmick.

Jim Lee, now one of the co-founders of Image Comics, published variant cover comic books through his Wildstorm Studios imprint. Gen^{13} #1 (Mar. 1995) bore 13 different covers, each with a character in an homage to a comic book, advertisement, or movie poster. Dv8 #1 (Aug. 1996) bore eight different covers, one a group shot and the rest representing the seven deadly sins.

Marvel's practice of issuing multiple variant covers backfired terribly when the bottom fell out of the market in c. 1997, as the company was stocked with multiple printings of variant and "collectible" issues that were no longer in high demand, and they could not cover the costs of their distribution service.

=== Chase covers ===
Due to shortages caused by production errors, some variant covers came to be known as "chase covers", as many scrambled to find them, much as baseball card collectors sought chase cards. Publishers created chase covers by issuing variants in ratios designed to make one variant rare. They also began to produce retailer-incentive copies - identical to the retail version, but with covers usually printed or embossed in silver or gold - with one retailer-incentive shipping for every 25 or 50 copies of the regular issue that the retailer ordered. Some smaller publishers such as Verotik created expensive adult-only variants depicting nudity. Additionally, comic book conventions gave attendees convention-exclusive variants as part of their convention packages.

=== Post-boom ===
==== DC Comics ====
In the years since the boom ended, with the remaining readers and publishers left in shell shock, publishers generally shied away from producing comics that appeared to be directed at collectors, variant covers among them. Recently, however, variant covers have made a comeback.

The 2004 limited series Identity Crisis from DC Comics was so popular that every issue went through multiple printings, each with a different cover. Some fans who had already bought the first printing bought the variants to complete their collection. Seeing this, other publishers tried to duplicate the success. For instance, for every set number of issues (Note: A varying number, decreasing from 20 issues for #1 to 15 issues for #6, itself revised from an earlier, more complicated formula.) a retailer ordered of New Avengers #1-6, they received a retailer-incentive issue featuring art by a heavily promoted Marvel artist.

In addition to retailer incentives, publishers again publish simple variants, though usually in equal proportions. Since Identity Crisis, second printings usually have a different cover, often merely the alteration or removal of color.

==== Marvel Comics ====
After the boom, Marvel Comics used variant covers on various occasions. When the Marvel Zombies universe first appeared in 2005's Ultimate Fantastic Four #21, the popularity spawned a limited series featuring several variant covers by Arthur Suydam. These variants reproduced classic Marvel Comics covers with an added zombie motif.

To celebrate the inauguration of Barack Obama, Amazing Spider-Man #583 presented an all-new story teaming up President Obama and Spider-Man in "Spidey Meets the President!" The title featured five variant covers.

In honor of Wolverine's 35th anniversary in 2009, Marvel released numerous Marvel titles with Wolverine Art Appreciation variant covers. The covers were done in styles reminiscent of Pablo Picasso, Salvador Dalí, and Andy Warhol.

The first issues to feature a Wolverine Art Appreciation variant cover were Captain Britain and MI13 #12, Amazing Spider-Man #590, Hulk #11, Uncanny X-Men #508, and Secret Warriors #3.

The publisher's single issue with the most variant covers is The Amazing Spider-Man (1963) No. 666 with 145 different covers.

== Criticism ==
In July 2014, Chuck Rozanski of Mile High Comics announced that he would likely end his four-decade-long history of appearances at San Diego Comic-Con due to the proliferation of convention-exclusive variants offered by publishers and toy manufacturers to convention attendees, many of whom Rozanski criticized for attending the convention solely to acquire those exclusives in order to resell them at higher prices on eBay. Rozanski further criticized publishers for denying these exclusives to retailers, which Rozanksi estimated cost Mile High Comics $10,000 of losses at the convention. In 2017, Mile High Comics announced it would no longer appear at San Diego Comic-Con.

== Outside of comics ==
The practice of issuing variant covers spread to some magazines, notably TV Guide (which has its own collector's market). TV Guide published variants for various TV series, including Smallville, Dawson's Creek and Friends.
