= Reverend Billy and the Church of Stop Shopping =

American actor and performance group

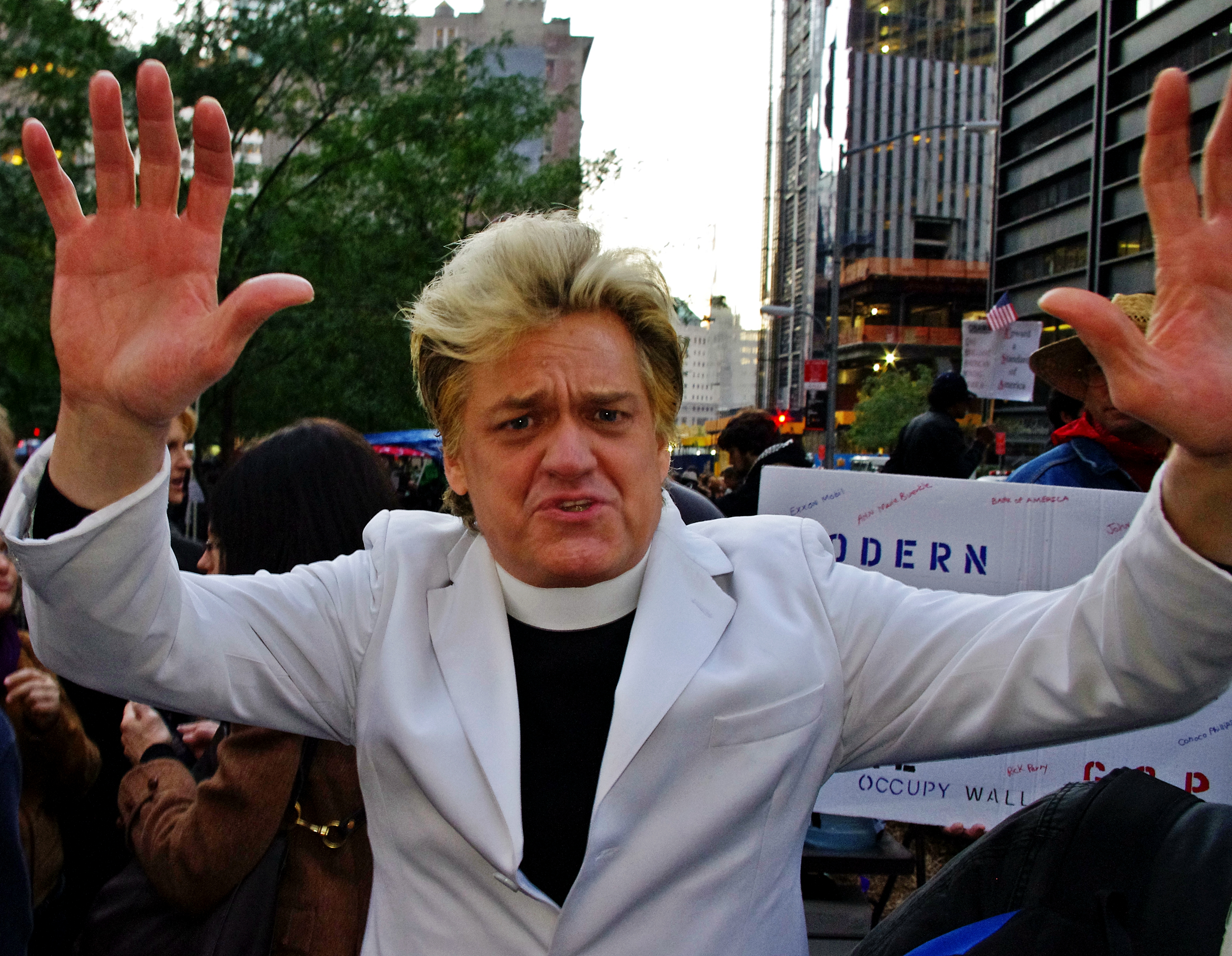
Reverend Billy performing in support of the movement at Occupy Wall Street

Reverend Billy and the Church of Stop Shopping is a radical performance community based in New York City. The Stop Shopping Choir is accompanied by a comic preacher, Reverend Billy, portrayed by performer William Talen. The philosophy of the Church of Stop Shopping surrounds the imminent "Shopocalypse", which assumes the end of humanity will come about through manic consumerism.

The Stop Shopping Choir accompanies Reverend Billy and stages guerrilla theater style actions, singing on the property of the Disney stores, Monsanto facilities, and Trump Tower, among others. In 2007 they were featured in What Would Jesus Buy? a film produced by Morgan Spurlock. They are often considered part of the Culture jamming movement.

The group uses the content from their direct actions to create songs that are performed on concert stages and in cabarets. The director of these shows is church co-founder Savitri D.

Reverend Billy and the Stop Shopping Choir routinely perform at Joe's Pub at The Public Theater in New York City. In 2024 they joined Neil Young and Crazy Horse on their Love Earth tour across the country.

In 2024, George Gonzalez, a sociologist and scholar of religion, published The Church of Stop Shopping and Religious Activism, which is a serious scholarly treatment of the group's quarter-century of arts-based public pedagogy.

== Origins of Reverend Billy ==
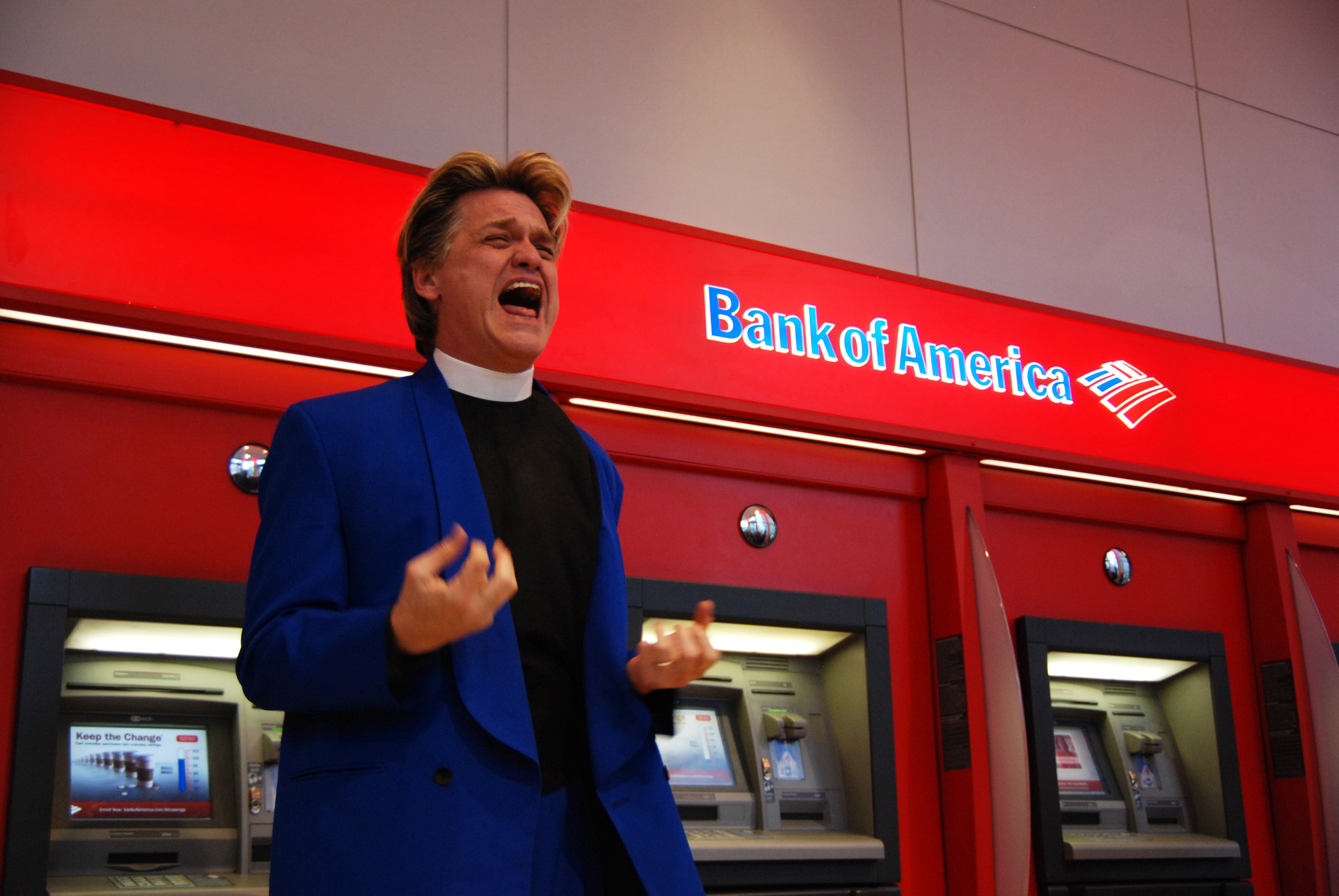
Rev. Billy attempting to exorcise bad loans and toxic assets from Bank of America ATMs in New York City, 2009

The character of Reverend Billy was developed in the early 1990s by actor and playwright William Talen. His family was Dutch Calvinist, from the Christian Reformed Church, a conservative protestant denomination.

Talen grew up in small towns throughout Minnesota, South Dakota and Wisconsin. He left home at 16, moving east with Charles and Patricia Gaines, a writer and painter who encouraged him as an artist. Talen began to perform his poems and stories, hitch-hiking from Philadelphia to New York to San Francisco.

Talen's chief collaborator in developing the Reverend Billy character was the Reverend Sidney Lanier, a cousin of Tennessee Williams. Lanier was vicar of The St. Clement's in the 1960s, an Episcopal Church in Hell's Kitchen in Manhattan. In an effort to increase attendance at St. Clement's, Lanier had torn out the altar and pews, inviting actors to perform scenes from plays by Tennessee Williams and Terrence McNally, and founding the American Place Theater. Lanier described Talen as "more of a preacher with a gift for social prophecy than an actor." In the early 1990s Talen moved with Lanier to New York City from the San Francisco Bay Area, branding his act as a "new kind of American preacher"

The Reverend Billy character debuted on the sidewalk at Times Square in 1998, outside the Disney Store, where he proclaimed Mickey Mouse to be the anti-Christ. He was arrested multiple times outside the Disney Store, where he duct-taped Mickey Mouse to a cross. Reverend Billy's sermons decried the evils of consumerism and the racism of sweatshop labor, and what Talen saw as the loss of neighborhood spirit in Rudolph Giuliani's New York.

The Reverend Billy character isn't so much a parody of a preacher, as a preacher motif used to blur the lines between performance and religious experience. "It's definitely a church service," Talen explained to Alternet, but, he added, it's "a political rally, it's theater, it's all three, it's none of them." Alisa Solomon, the theater critic at the Village Voice, said of Reverend Billy's persona, "The collar is fake, the calling is real." Along with the Church of Stop Shopping, they have been referred to by academics as "performance activism," "carnivalesque protest," and "commercial disobedience."

In 2005, he stated his mission to CNN news, while dictating in speech patterns typical to televangelists:

Drive the demons out of those cash registers […] We're trying to get [shoppers] to slow down their consumption. Amen! We're addicted; we're conflicted—we're hypnotized; we're consumerized!

== Savitri D, church co-founder and theatrical director ==
Savitri D (née Durkee) is the co-founder and director of the Church of Stop Shopping, as well as Talen's partner. She was born in Taos, New Mexico in 1972 and raised at The Lama Foundation, one of the earliest and longest lasting intentional spiritual communities in the US, founded by her parents, Steven and Barbara Durkee.

Savitri D began dancing and performing at the University of Montana, studied at the Merce Cunningham Dance Company, and co-founded a dance collective called The Zen Monkey Project. After moving to New York City in 1997, she staged her play SKY/NO SKY at 57 Walker Street.

In 2000, she was a producer at The Culture Project, a theater in the East Village, where Talen was staging early Reverend Billy performances. She took over direction of The Church of Stop Shopping performances from Tony Torn in the aftermath of the September 11 attacks in 2001, and married Talen the next year.

Under Savitri D's leadership, the Church won the Alpert Award for Theater and the Edwin Booth Award from the City University of New York.

== The Stop Shopping Choir ==
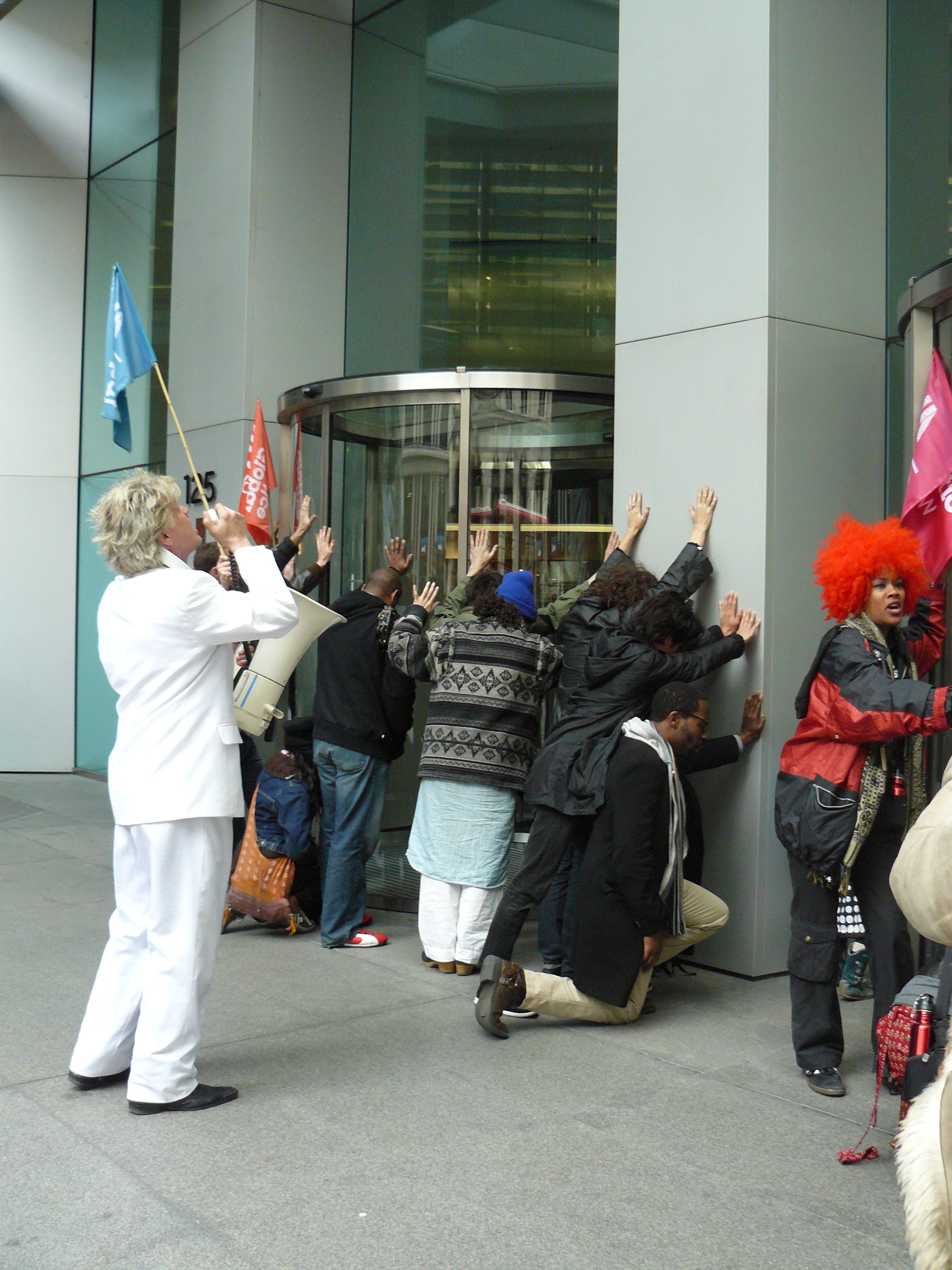
A 2015 'exorcism’ of corporate power in the offices of global law firm King & Spalding

The Stop Shopping Choir is a 35-member ensemble that performs an array of original gospel songs in theater performances and alongside Reverend Billy in public spaces during campaigns. The choir began accompanying Talen's sermons at concert shows shortly after the September 11 attacks, adding a musical influence to Reverend Billy performances. Led by musical director Nehemiah Luckett, the choir members are volunteers who rehearse weekly at the Lower Eastside Girl's Club in the East Village.

The Choir often write songs that draw attention to the environmental and consumerist campaigns championed by the Church of Stop Shopping. They have accompanied Talen into the lobbies of multinational banks such as JP Morgan Chase or research facilities belonging to Monsanto, dressed as golden toads and honeybees, singing songs in support of the day's sermon. One of their best-known songs is "The First Amendment", an incantation of the 1st Amendment of the United States Constitution, sung rapturously by soprano Laura Newman.

In November of 2021, Reverend Billy and the Stop Shopping Choir came to the United Kingdom for their "Earth Riot 21" tour, culminating in Glasgow for COP26. During this time, a UK branch of the choir was established as a community choir in London. The UK branch has since toured with Reverend Billy and the Stop Shopping Choir in 2022 and 2024.

In April of 2024, Reverend Billy and the Stop Shopping Choir joined Neil Young and Crazy Horse on their Love Earth tour throughout the United States, and in fall 2025 again joined Young on tour with Young's new band the Chrome Hearts.

== Direct action campaigns ==
In addition to protest performances throughout a given year, Reverend Billy and the Church of Stop Shopping have organized various campaigns focused on consumerist or environmental issues, often highlighting a particular company they feel best symbolizes the issue. The group stage actions in public spaces near the targets of their actions, or in the lobbies, halls, and plazas of the building owned by the companies they protest. Their sermons and songs routinely draw the attention of police and security forces assigned to those spaces, leading to arrests and significant media coverage. Talen and Savitri D have been arrested more than 50 times during their actions, though their charges are almost always reduced or dropped.

=== Early campaigns ===
Reverend Billy and the Church of Stop Shopping staged numerous actions around New York City in their formative years. In 2000, after performing a Christmas show the New School's Tishman Auditorium, Reverend Billy led the congregation and members of the audience from the stage to the Poe House on West 3rd Street in Manhattan's West Village. There, the Reverend held a protest reading of "The Raven" atop the scaffolding over the soon-to-be-demolished home where some believe Edgar Allan Poe had finished writing the famous poem. After the reading, Talen was arrested and jailed.

After September 11, the Church and Choir met routinely in the Path Station near Ground Zero and sang the First Amendment to the U.S. Constitution into their phones as commuters passed by. The crowd of singers sometimes reached up to 200 participants.

On June 29, 2007, just before the start of the monthly Critical Mass bike ride, Reverend Billy and Savitri D recited the First Amendment repeatedly to police officers through a megaphone in Manhattan's Union Square. Reverend Billy was arrested on charges of second-degree harassment. The civil liberties lawyer Norman Siegel defended Reverend Billy in court, saying "Reverend Billy has a First Amendment right to recite the First Amendment."

=== Starbucks ===
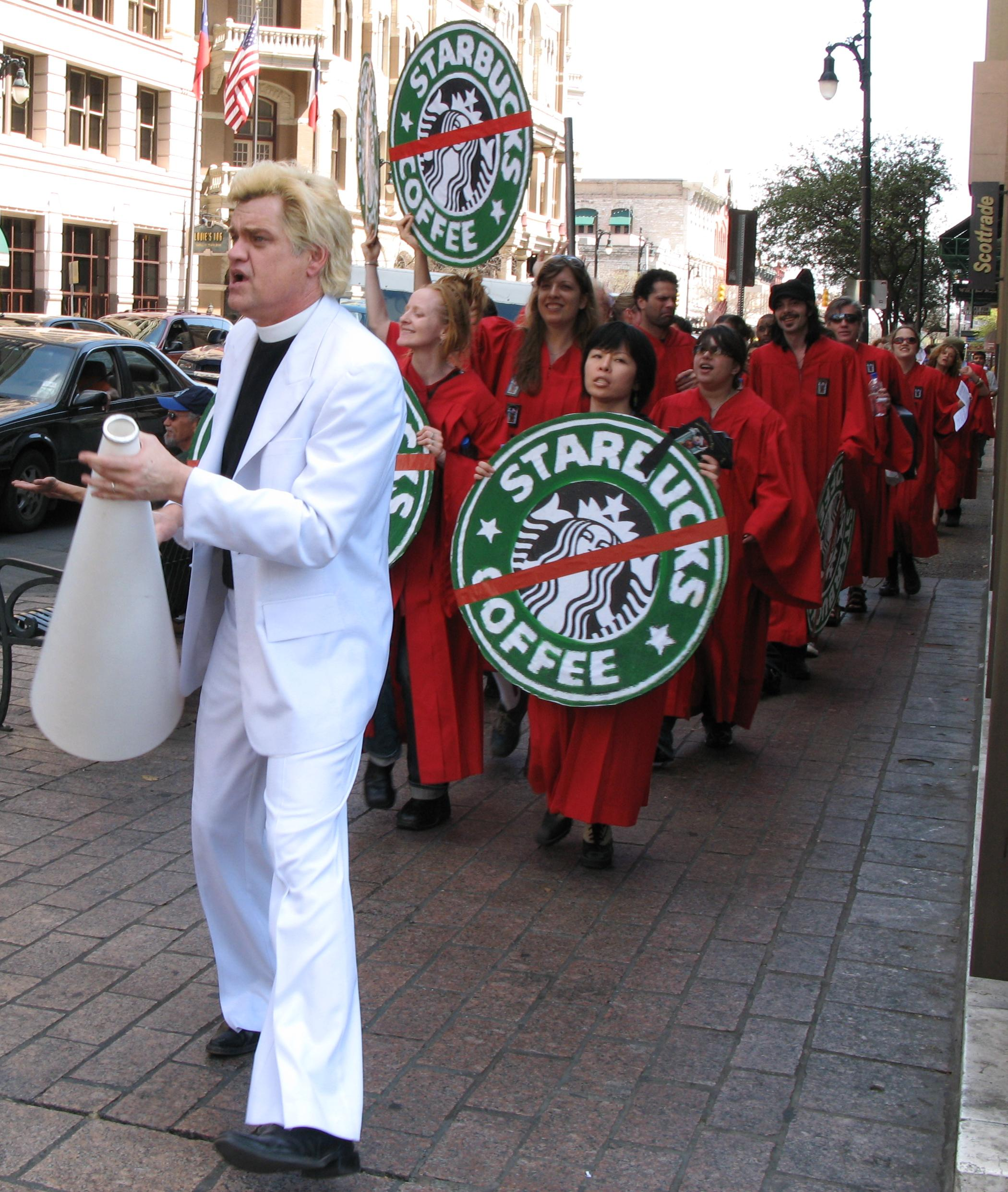
The Reverend Billy leading an anti-Starbucks protest in Austin, Texas in 2007

The Church of Stop Shopping staged a series of actions across the country from 2002 to 2008, protesting against what they call Starbucks company's enactment of "fake bohemia." Reverend Billy and the singers tried to "exorcise the demon of cookie-cutter capitalism" from its cash registers, by laying hands on the register, weeping, and harmonizing.

The Starbucks coffee chain has been a frequent target of the Church's actions, due to displacement of small local businesses, union busting, and exploitation of coffee farmers.

In 2002, Starbucks branches throughout New York City issued a document to its workers entitled "What Should I do If Reverend Billy Is in My Store?", which outlines an evacuation protocol and a series of scripted reassurances that workers are ordered to deliver to disturbed or inquisitive customers. The title of the document is also the title of a book written by Talen, published by The New Press.

In 2004, Starbucks persuaded a Los Angeles judge to issue an injunction against Talen, demanding that he cease and desist from "stalking, contacting, or sexually harassing the computerized cash registers of the Starbucks Company."

=== Mayoral Campaign ===
In 2009, Reverend Billy ran as the Green Party candidate for mayor of New York City, as a protest campaign, against the increased corporatization and gentrification under then two-term incumbent mayor Michael Bloomberg.

=== Golden Toads and Bank Actions ===
In 2012 and 2013, Reverend Billy and the Church focused on the extinction of species brought by climate change, specifically targeting banks they said financed projects that worsened global warming. The symbolic centerpiece of these campaigns was the extinct Golden toad, originally native to Monteverde cloud forest in Costa Rica and a symbol of the crisis of declining amphibian species. Savitri D and the choir wore papier-mâché masks depicting golden toads as they entered JP Morgan Chase and HSBC banks.

In one action in a Chase bank in New York City, Reverend Billy and choir director Nehemiah Luckett were arrested and charged with riot, trespass, unlawful assembly, and disorderly conduct. According to the bank manager in a complaint to police, Reverend Billy and the choir were "running about the bank while wearing frog masks … jumping on to the bank's furniture, running about the bank, and screaming loudly at others for a number of minutes." The manager also stated that he thought the bank was being robbed, that he feared for his safety, and that customers or bank employees even cried.

Despite the complaints against them and what the New York prosecutor called a "criminal stunt," demanding that Talen go to prison for a year, their charges were eventually dropped.

=== British Petroleum and Liberate Tate ===
As part of the Church of Stop Shopping's efforts to urge art institutions to reject sponsorship from petroleum companies, they have protested at a number of museums around the world.

In July 2011, while on tour in the UK, Reverend Billy and the Choir staged an action at the Tate Modern in London to protest its sponsorship by the oil company British Petroleum (BP). The church was invited by a coalition of UK groups, including Liberate Tate, BP or Not BP, Platform, UK Tar Sands Network, London Rising Tide, Art Not Oil and Climate Rush.

While crowds observed the scene in the Turbine Room of the Tate, the choir splashed Reverend Billy and the BP sunflower logo with bottles of black oil. After the performance, the protesters exited the museum singing onto the lawn outside, and rallied on the shore of the Thames against oil companies and their involvement in the arts.

=== Robobees ===
In 2014, Reverend Billy, Savitri D and the Choir turned their focus to colony collapse disorder affecting the world's honeybees. In one action, they entered the Micro-robotics Laboratory at Harvard's School of Engineering and Applied Science to confront scientists working on the invention of robot pollinators, popularly known as RoboBees. They purchased fruits and vegetables to place before a display case with a model of the RoboBee, singing and lamenting the focus of scientists replacing living bees with robots, rather than solving the collapse.

“We ask you to place your genius, your research, your scientific know-how into saving the honeybee," Talen said to those assembled. Attending the event and writing for The New Yorker, Elizabeth Kolbert noted the confusion among some of the Harvard graduate students witnessing the singing and preaching. "We like people not to know if we're a political rally, a religious service, or a theatrical comedy about a church," Reverend Billy told Kolbert. "If they have all three spinning in their head, and they can't settle on one, then they're probably having a raw experience."

=== Monsanto ===
The Church of Stop Shopping has also targeted chemical manufacturer Monsanto for its production of glysophate herbicides and neonicotinoid pesticides. In November 2014, the Church traveled to Monsanto's headquarters in St. Louis, Missouri, where they held an "Organic Thanksgiving."

In 2015, Reverend Billy & The Stop Shopping Choir opened a series of shows for Neil Young during his tour in support of The Monsanto Years.

On October 13, 2016, Reverend Billy was arrested while protesting the World Food Prize in Des Moines, Iowa. He was charged with trespass for leaving the "free speech area" set up near the event. The prosecutor for the state requested "that the Court preclude evidence or argument regarding 'free speech rights,' 'free expression,'right to assemble,' and/or other First Amendment arguments and evidence that 'free speech rights' can constitute 'justification' under the Iowa's criminal trespass statute, Iowa Code §716.7 (2015)." The judge in the case ultimately dismissed the charges.

In 2016, the Church released a guide called "The United States Map of Poisoned Parks and Playgrounds," which shows the dosage and location of glyphosate applications around the U.S.

== Filmography ==
- Culture Jam: Hijacking Commercial Culture, directed by Jill Sharpe.
- Reverend Billy and the Church of Stop Shopping, by Dietmar Post and Lucia Palacios, produced by Play Loud! Productions.
- Preacher with an Unknown God, 2005 documentary by Rob VanAlkemade, Honorable Mention in Short Filmmaking at the Sundance Film Festival
- The Last Televangelist, series on Free Speech TV.
- What Would Jesus Buy?, 2007 feature-length documentary by Rob VanAlkemade. Story by Savitri D, Morgan Spurlock, Bill Talen, and Rob VanAlkemade. Produced by Peter Hutchison, Stacey Offman, and Morgan Spurlock.

== Bibliography ==
- What Should I Do If Reverend Billy Is in My Store.
- What Would Jesus Buy?: Reverend Billy's Fabulous Prayers in the Face of the Shopocalypse.
- The Reverend Billy Project: From Rehearsal Hall to Super Mall with The Church of Life After Shopping.
- The End of the World.
- The Earth Wants YOU.

== Discography ==
- Reverend Billy & The Stop Shopping Gospel Choir.
- The Shopocolypse. 2008.
- The Declaration of Occupation of NYC.
- Earthalujah!
- The Earth Wants You.
