= Super Size Me 2: Holy Chicken! =

2017 documentary film by Morgan Spurlock

- Toronto International Film Festival screening poster
- Directed by: Morgan Spurlock
- Written by: Morgan Spurlock; Jeremy Chilnick
- Produced by: Keith Calder; Morgan Spurlock; Jeremy Chilnick; Matthew Galkin; Spencer Silna; Jessica Calder; Nicole Barton
- Starring: Morgan Spurlock
- Cinematography: David Vlasits
- Edited by: Pierre Takal
- Music by: Jeff Meegan; David Tobin
- Production companies: Warrior Poets; Snoot Entertainment; Public Domain
- Distributed by: Samuel Goldwyn Films
- Release dates: September 8, 2017 (TIFF); September 6, 2019 (United States)
- Running time: 93 minutes
- Country: United States
- Language: English

Super Size Me 2: Holy Chicken! is a 2017 American documentary film directed by Morgan Spurlock. A sequel to the 2004 film Super Size Me, it explores ways in which the fast food industry has rebranded itself as healthier since his original film through the process of Spurlock working to open his own fast-food restaurant, thus exposing some of the ways in which rebranding is more perception than reality. This was Spurlock's final film before his death in 2024.

== Synopsis ==
The film opens with a series of news reels detailing the grand opening of a new fast food restaurant owned by Morgan Spurlock, best known for his documentary Super Size Me, detailing the negative effects of eating exclusively at the fast food chain McDonald's for a month. Spurlock goes on to explain that six months prior to this grand opening, he had received an invite from the marketing agency for Carl's Jr. and Hardee's proposing a commercial script where he goes to expose them as a bad fast food brand, only to discover they were "actually doing a lot of great things". Skeptical that fast food has improved in the 12 years since his original documentary, when many of the health issues faced then are still prominent, Spurlock wants to learn more. Rather than go on another fast food binge, he decides to "become part of the problem" by opening his own fast food chain in order to find the truth.

After consulting with CCD Innovation on a business model, Spurlock discovers that the "Big Chicken" industry has made it hard to purchase live chickens to raise on a chicken farm. He learns that the five major chicken producers are Tyson Foods, Pilgrim's Pride, Sanderson Farms, Koch Foods, and Perdue Farms.

Spurlock discusses the National Chicken Council with a farmer. Near the end of the movie, he opens his own chicken sandwich restaurant in Columbus, Ohio. He labels his restaurant "Holy Chicken".

== Release ==
At the 2017 Toronto International Film Festival, where it premiered on September 8, 2017, the film was second runner-up for the People's Choice Award for Documentaries. Following its premiere, YouTube announced they had purchased distribution rights to the film to stream on YouTube Red for $3.5 million. In December 2017, YouTube Red temporarily dropped the film after Spurlock admitted to previous instances of sexual misconduct and harassment. The production company Warrior Poets also announced that the film was being pulled from the 2018 Sundance Film Festival. Samuel Goldwyn Films released the film in theaters on September 6, 2019, and released it on VOD a week later. It was also restored on YouTube, along with its predecessor, as part of the new YouTube Movies service under the "Free to Watch" category.

== Reception ==
On Rotten Tomatoes, the film has an approval rating of 74%, based on 34 reviews, with an average rating of 7.17/10. The website's consensus reads, "Super Size Me 2: Holy Chicken! may not be as filling as its predecessor, but it still manages to offer a moderately enriching overview of unsavory industry practices." On Metacritic, the film has a score of 61 out of 100, based on 13 critics, indicating "generally favorable reviews".
