= What Would Jesus Buy? =

- Theatrical release poster
- Directed by: Rob VanAlkemade
- Produced by: Morgan Spurlock; Peter Hutchison; Stacey Offman
- Starring: Bill Talen
- Music by: Steve Horowitz; Wade Tonken; William Moses
- Distributed by: Warrior Poets
- Release date: 2007
- Running time: 90 minutes
- Country: United States
- Language: English

What Would Jesus Buy? is a 2007 documentary film produced by Morgan Spurlock and directed by Rob VanAlkemade. The title is a take-off on the phrase, "what would Jesus do?". The film debuted on the festival circuit on March 11, 2007, at the South By Southwest (SXSW) conference in Austin, Texas. It went into general U.S. release on November 16, 2007.

The film follows the exploits of the satirical group Reverend Billy and the Church of Stop Shopping. Although founded as a performance collective rather than an actual religious organization, members of the group express spiritual viewpoints against excessive consumerism and materialism, particularly in the context of Christmas. The aforementioned Reverend Billy, played by social activist Bill Talen, is intended by its non-Christian performer not as parody but as a living example of past radical preachers.

== Synopsis ==
The film focuses on the issues of the commercialization of Christmas, materialism, the over-consumption in American culture, globalization, and the business practices of large corporations, as well as their economic and cultural effects on American society, as seen through the prism of activist and performance artist Bill Talen, who goes by the alias of "Reverend Billy", and his troupe of activists, whose street theater performances take the form of a church choir called "The Church of Stop Shopping", that sings anti-shopping and anti-corporate songs. The film follows Billy and his choir as they take a cross-country trip in the month prior to Christmas 2005, and spread their message against what they perceive as the evils of patronizing the retail outlets of several different large corporate chains.

== Crew ==
The film was produced by Morgan Spurlock, with cinematography by Alan Deutsch, Daniel Marracino, Martin Palafox, Alex Stikich and Rob VanAlkemade. The film was edited by Gavin Coleman and Stela Georgieva.

== Reception ==
The film received mixed reviews. On the review aggregator website Rotten Tomatoes, the film holds an approval rating of 56%, based on 57 reviews, and an average rating of 5.96/10. The site's critical consensus reads, "WWJB is an eye opening doc about consumerism that manages to be both funny and informative." The film has a score of 60 on Metacritic, indicating "mixed or average reviews".

== See also ==
- Buy Nothing Christmas
- Buy Nothing Day
- Festivus
