= Chuck Rozanski =

Comics retailer and columnist

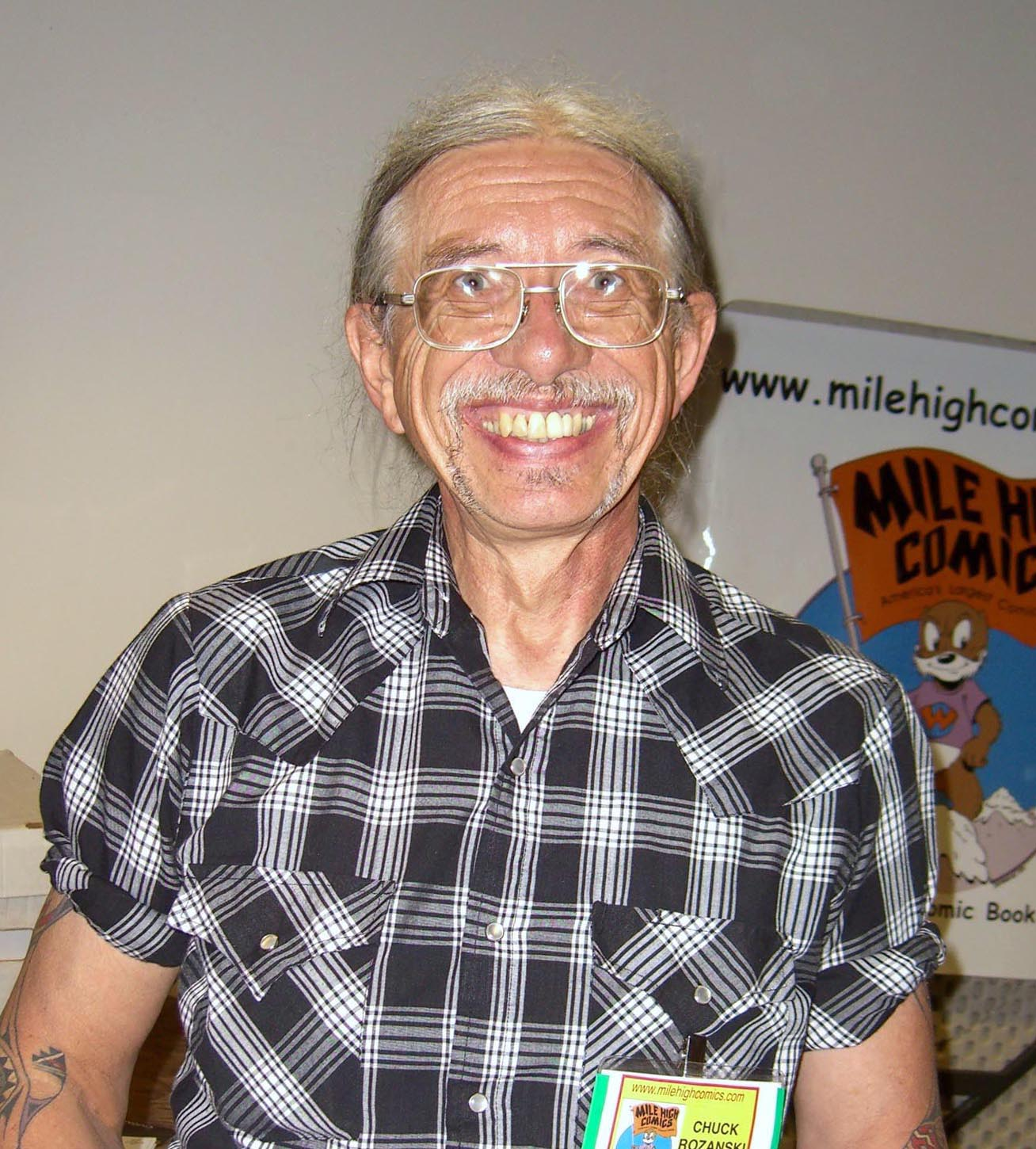
- Rozanski at the Big Apple Convention in Manhattan, May 22, 2011
- Born: March 11, 1955 (age 71); Goldbach, Bavaria, West Germany
- Other name: Bettie Pages
- Education: University of Colorado Boulder
- Alma mater: Widefield High School
- Occupations: Retailer, columnist
- Years active: 1969–present
- Organization: Mile High Comics
- Notable work: "Tales From the Database"
- Spouse: Nanette Furman (m. 1978)
- Children: four daughters
- Website: www.milehighcomics.com

Charles M. Rozanski (born March 11, 1955) is a German-American retailer and columnist, known as the president and CEO of the Denver, Colorado-based Mile High Comics Inc., and a former columnist for the Comics Buyer's Guide.

== Early life ==
Rozanski was born March 11, 1955, in Goldbach, Bavaria, West Germany, and later moved to the United States with his mother and stepfather, an American Army officer.

As described by Rozanski, his stepfather was abusive, and his mother, originally from the German town of Goldbach, had mental illness due to trauma caused by her experiences during World War II. The family was poor, and they moved frequently once they relocated to the U.S.

Rozanski graduated from Widefield High School in Colorado Springs. He attended the University of Colorado Boulder but dropped out in 1974.

== Career ==
=== Mile High Comics ===
In 1969, when Rozanski was 13, he began working out of his parents' Colorado Springs basement, selling back issues of comic books by running mail-order ads in the magazine Rocket's Blast Comicollector. The following year, he began promoting comics as the youngest seller ever to exhibit at the Colorado Springs Antiques Market. In 1971, he founded the Colorado Springs Comics Club.

The following year, he attended his first national comics convention, Multicon in Oklahoma City, where he sold $1,800 USD in comics in three days. It was at this point that he realized comics retailing could be a career. He opened the first Mile High Comics store in Boulder, Colorado, in 1974 with $800 in cash and 10,000 comics. By 1977, he had expanded to four stores in the greater Denver area.

In December of that year, he purchased the Edgar Church Collection, the largest and highest-quality Golden Age comics collection ever discovered. The cache had been preserved due to the unvarying 60-degree temperature and minimal humidity, and consisted of 16,000 comic books dating from 1937 to 1955, including the first Superman comic and the first Marvel Comic. The purchase of the Church Collection helped Mile High Comics expand its influence nationally, and helped bring a geometric rise to the price of rare comic books, which became a legitimate investment.

In 1986, Rozanski sold a batch of comics from the Church Collection and used the profits to put a down payment on a 22,000 square-foot Mile High Comics warehouse.

In 1979 Rozanski purchased Richard Alf Comics' mail order division, with which he gained systems and methods for greatly expanding his mail order sales. To that end, he created Alternate Realities Distributing, Inc., a wholesale distributor run by Rozanski's wife Nanette. The Rozanskis eventually sold Alternate Realities to Bud Plant in 1987.

In 1980, Rozanski purchased a double-page ad in mainstream Marvel comics, listing prices for back issues he had for sale. This ad, which was the first of its kind, was a departure from the general practice of the time for its inclusion of prices, which Rozanski explains was a way to educate non-collectors as to the value of their collections. The success of the ad affirmed that back issues were a valid commodity for the collector's market, and led not only to a boom to Mile High Comics, but to the entire back issue market. Mile High Comics frequently placed ads in Marvel and DC comics in the 1980s, listing back issues of comic books that could be purchased through the mail.

In 1993 Rozanski and Mile High Comics opened the first comics mega-store in Denver, which measured 11,000 square feet. The company eventually expanded to eight stores, although by 2024 it had retracted to a single 45,000-square-foot mega store in northwest Denver.

=== Writing ===
Rozanski wrote the column "Tales from the Database" for the Comics Buyer's Guide from 2001 through 2009.

=== Appearances ===
Rozanski drives all over the U.S. to local comics shops in order to stock Mile High's back issue inventory. He is also a frequent attendee at comic book conventions across the country.

Rozanski was one of five people whose journey to and experiences at San Diego Comic Con were depicted in the 2011 Morgan Spurlock documentary Comic-Con Episode IV: A Fan's Hope. In the film, Rozanski seeks to sell a copy of Red Raven #1 for $500,000 in order to pay off his debts. Although he does not sell the comic book, his booth at the convention generates more profit than the previous year's, allowing Mile High Comics to move into a new 65,000 square foot warehouse.

== Awards and recognition ==
Rozanski is widely recognized as an industry leader, and in 2003 he was awarded the Defender of Liberty Award by the Comic Book Legal Defense Fund for his long-standing dedication to the protection of free speech.

== Personal life ==
Rozanski and his wife, Nanette Furman, were married in Boulder in 1978. They have four daughters: Rowan, Aleta, Tanith, and Elsbeth.

In 2008, partly as a result of encephalitis, Rozanski discovered his "Two-spirit" identity, and realized that he was gender-fluid. In 2017, Rozanski came out, publicly adopting the drag queen personality of Bettie Pages (inspired by the pin-up model Bettie Page). That year, Rozanski shared the news with his Mile High Comics customers as well:

He announced his Bettie Pages persona in a newsletter that went out to his 118,000 subscribers in 2017. "I knew that I would lose business," he said, and he was right. About 10,000 customers left his mailing list overnight, some leaving pointed, vitriolic parting shots. “But guess what? In short order, I had 10,000 more join,” he said.

Since then, Rozanski has decorated the Mile High Comics warehouse entrance with rainbow-colored steps, while the corridor leading to the store displays posters honoring the Colorado Springs nightclub shooting victims, accompanied by a prominent sign proclaiming "Transgender rights are human rights." Rozanski emphasizes the establishment as a refuge, actively confronting homophobia. Despite threats from groups like the Proud Boys, Rozanski defiantly hosts inclusive events, including drag shows, embodying resilience against intimidation tactics.

As of 2023, Chuck and Nanette live in Boulder with their oldest daughter, her son-in-law, and their transgender grandson.
