= Don't Eat This Book =

2005 book

Don't Eat This Book: Fast Food and the Supersizing of America
- Author: Morgan Spurlock
- Language: English
- Publisher: Putnam
- Publication date: 2005
- Publication place: United States
- ISBN: 9780399152603

Don't Eat This Book: Fast Food and the Supersizing of America (usually shortened to Don't Eat This Book) is a 2005 book by Morgan Spurlock.

== Content ==
Spurlock was known for his work in the documentary Super Size Me, and the book is a follow-up to the film. It starts off with some statistics on American spending habits and explanations, for example of the warning label. It concentrates on American eating habits, with references to the film. It also talks briefly about how McDonald's started, and how its CEOs attempt to carry on Ray Kroc's legacy.

== Critical reception ==
Kirkus Reviews called Don't Eat This Book "even more disturbing" than the documentary, and praised the book as "a powerful work of reporting and punditry."

== See also ==
- Super Size Me
