= Masters W65 javelin 400g world record progression =

Masters W65 javelin world record progression is the progression of world record improvements of the javelin throw W65 division of Masters athletics. Records must be set in properly conducted, official competitions under the standing IAAF rules unless modified by World Masters Athletics. The W65 division consists of female athletes who have reached the age of 65 but have not yet reached the age of 70, so exactly from their 65th birthday to the day before their 70th birthday. The W65 division threw the 400g javelin until the end of 2013. Since 2014, the W65 division throws a 500 g implement. These are the records for the 400g javelin. WMA discontinued this weight after the end of 2013. The records will be officially recognized along with 500g records until the lighter weight mark is surpassed. Evaun Wiliams has held the record for 400g since 2006 and will likely hold it in perpetuity since the event is no longer contested.

Key

Incomplete information Pending

Distance	Athlete	Nationality	Birthdate	Location	Date
38.07	Evaun Wiliams	United Kingdom	19.12.1937	Poznań	20.07.2006
36.79	Gertraud Schönauer	Austria	27.02.1937	Löfflingen	15.05.2002
33.02	Sigrun Kofink	Germany	23.04.1935	Hösbach	22.09.2001
31.02	Heather Doherty	Australia	21.07.1933	Canberra	01.04.1999
