= Rats (film) =

- Promotional release poster
- Directed by: Morgan Spurlock
- Written by: Jeremy Chilnick; Morgan Spurlock
- Based on: Rats: Observations on the History & Habitat of the City’s Most Unwanted Inhabitants by Robert Sullivan
- Starring: Dr. Michael Blum; Bobby Corrigan; Ed Sheehan
- Production companies: Dakota Group; Discovery Channel
- Release date: September 13, 2016 (TIFF)
- Running time: 84 minutes
- Country: United States
- Language: English

Rats, also known as Rats NYC, is a 2016 American documentary horror film directed by Morgan Spurlock. Based on a book by Robert Sullivan and distributed by the Discovery Channel, the film chronicles rat infestations in major cities throughout the world.

== Synopsis ==
The film primarily focuses on rat infestations and exterminations, including methods such as night-patrol teams in Mumbai snapping rats' necks and the practice of ratting in England. Much of the documentary has been considered a detailing of "the 'war' against rats", featuring "bashing, slicing, dissecting and poisoning". The director also journeys to the Karni Mata Temple in Rajasthan, India, where over 35,000 black rats are revered by devotees who believe them to be reincarnated human beings.

== Release and reception ==
The documentary premiered at the Toronto International Film Festival on September 13, 2016. The film premiered on television on October 22, 2016, airing on the Discovery Channel.

The Daily Telegraph reported on the film's trailer for its "stomach-churning footage" and "disturbing scenes", with writer Rebecca Hawkes noting that the trailer's footage, which includes rats being killed by terriers, "will likely provoke a strong response from viewers". The Hollywood Reporter wrote that the documentary "plays much like a horror film", and in reference to the terrier scene, called it "an absolute bloodbath ... with filters appropriate for a zombie apocalypse". Wendy Ide of The Guardian wrote that the film is "gleefully exploitative in its approach, and as such, it is horribly entertaining". Peter Debruge of Variety called the film "super-disgusting" and "[un]fair to the animals in question, who would surely view this as a grisly, “Faces of Death”-style marathon of murder", writing that "rarely has a filmmaker more blatantly manipulated the material he has collected to game his audience".

=== Accolades ===
Award	Category	Recipients	Result	Ref.
Saturn Awards	Best Television Presentation	Rats	Nominated	
