= Mile High Comics =

American online comics retailer and a store

- Type: Private
- Industry: Collectibles
- Founded: 1969; 57 years ago in Colorado Springs, Colorado
- Founder: Chuck Rozanski
- Headquarters: Denver, Colorado
- Area served: Worldwide
- Services: Comic book retailing
- Revenue: $3.5 million in 1987
- Owner: Chuck Rozanski
- Website: milehighcomics.com

Mile High Comics is an online retailer and comic book store based in Denver, Colorado. Founded by Chuck Rozanski in 1969 as a mail-order business, the company opened its first retail store in Boulder, Colorado, in 1974. It later expanded to multiple locations in Colorado and California. As of 2024, it operates a single location, the Jason Street Mega Store in Denver.

== History ==
=== Origins ===
Rozanski started Mile High Comics in 1969, when he was 13 years old, selling back issues of comic books out of his parents' Colorado Springs basement by running mail-order ads in the magazine Rocket's Blast Comicollector.

The first Mile High Comics retail location opened in Boulder, Colorado, in 1974 with 10,000 comics and $800 in cash. By 1977, it had expanded to four stores in the greater Denver area.

=== Edgar Church Collection ===
In December 1977, Rozanski purchased the Edgar Church Collection, the largest and highest-quality Golden Age comics collection ever discovered. The cache had been preserved due to the unvarying 60-degree temperature and minimal humidity, and consisted of 16,000 comic books dating from 1937 to 1955, including the first Superman comic and the first Marvel comic. The purchase of the Church Collection helped Mile High Comics expand its influence nationally and helped bring a geometric rise to the price of rare comic books, which became a legitimate investment.

In c. 1986, Rozanski sold a batch of comics from the Church Collection and used the profits to put a down payment on a 22,000 square-foot warehouse.

=== Mail order business ===
In 1979, Rozanski purchased Richard Alf Comics' mail-order division, with which he gained systems and methods for greatly expanding his mail order sales.

In 1980, Rozanski purchased a double-page ad in mainstream Marvel comics, listing prices for back issues he had for sale. This ad, which was the first of its kind, was a departure from the general practice of the time because of its inclusion of prices, which Rozanski explains was a way to educate non-collectors as to the value of their collections. The ad affirmed that back issues were a valid commodity for the collector's market, and led not only to a boom for Mile High Comics, but to the entire back-issue market. Mile High Comics frequently placed ads in Marvel and DC comics in the 1980s, listing back issues of comic books that could be purchased through the mail.

=== Expansion ===
In 1986, Mile High moved its headquarters and warehouse to a 22,000-square-foot building at 2151 West 56th Avenue in Denver.

By 1987, Rozanski had five retail locations in the Denver area:

- All in a Dream (Denver)
- Top-Notch Comics (Denver)
- The Comic Store (Westminster)
- Fantasy Works (Aurora)
- Time Warp (Boulder)

At that point, the company was generating $3.5 million a year in sales.

In 1993, Rozanski opened his first "mega-store", on Washington St. in Thornton, which measured 11,000 square feet. The company eventually expanded to eight stores — the Thornton mega-store, two locations in Denver, one in Lakewood, one in Colorado Springs, one in Littleton, one in Aurora, and another mega-store in Anaheim, California — and grew to become one of the most successful comics specialty shops in the United States.

One of Mile High's employees, David Vinson, was hired by DC Comics in 1994 as a manager of distributor relations.

=== Internet sales ===
In 1999, Mile High Comics announced it planned to sell comics on the Internet, in a planned partnership with Amazon.com.

In 2012, Mile High Comics had four locations: a new 65,000-square-foot megastore east of 46th Avenue and Jason Street in northwest Denver (purchased for $1.6 million), and retail locations in Glendale, Littleton, and Lakewood.

In July 2014 Rozanski announced Mile High Comics would likely end its four-decade-long history of appearances at San Diego Comic-Con, due to the proliferation of convention-exclusive variants offered by publishers and toy manufacturers to convention attendees, many of whom Rozanski criticized for attending the convention solely to acquire those exclusives in order to resell them at higher prices on eBay. Rozanski further criticized publishers for denying these exclusives to retailers, which Rozanksi estimates cost Mile High Comics $10,000 of losses at the convention. Rozanski said that Mile High would continue its presence at other conventions such as Denver Comic Con, where Mile High's hourly sales were double those at San Diego, despite the fact that the Denver convention yielded half the attendance of San Diego. In 2017, Mile High Comics announced it would no longer appear at San Diego Comic-Con.

=== Business consolidation ===
In 2015, after 29 years at that location, Rozanski sold the Mile High Comics warehouse to a marijuana distributor, clearing one million dollars in the transaction.

On December 31, 2018, Mile High Comics closed its Glendale location, at 760 South Colorado Boulevard.

In the spring of 2019, Mile High Comics closed its Lakewood store.

In early 2019, Rozanski (who came out as gender fluid in 2017), began hosting at the store Drag For All Ages, "a regular under-21 drag show every first Sunday of the month." Protestors, among them members of the Proud Boys, began showing up at the events, with some incidents becoming threatening.

In late May 2019, a former Mile High Comics employee was accused of stealing between $40,000 and $50,000 worth of comics, mostly in the form of 15 collector's edition comic books, from the Mega Store. Later, in early 2020, seven storage trailers owned by Rozanski were ransacked by thieves, resulting in at least $250,000 in losses and damages.

As of 2024, Mile High Comics has one remaining physical location, the 45,000-square-foot Jason Street Mega Store in Denver. As described by Rozanski, the Mega Store, e.g., the "'Cathedral of Comics', boasts 15 million books, magazines, posters, collectibles, toys, games, and more.... Rozanski estimates his inventory is worth $100 million."
