= Goldbach, Bavaria =

Goldbach
- Municipality
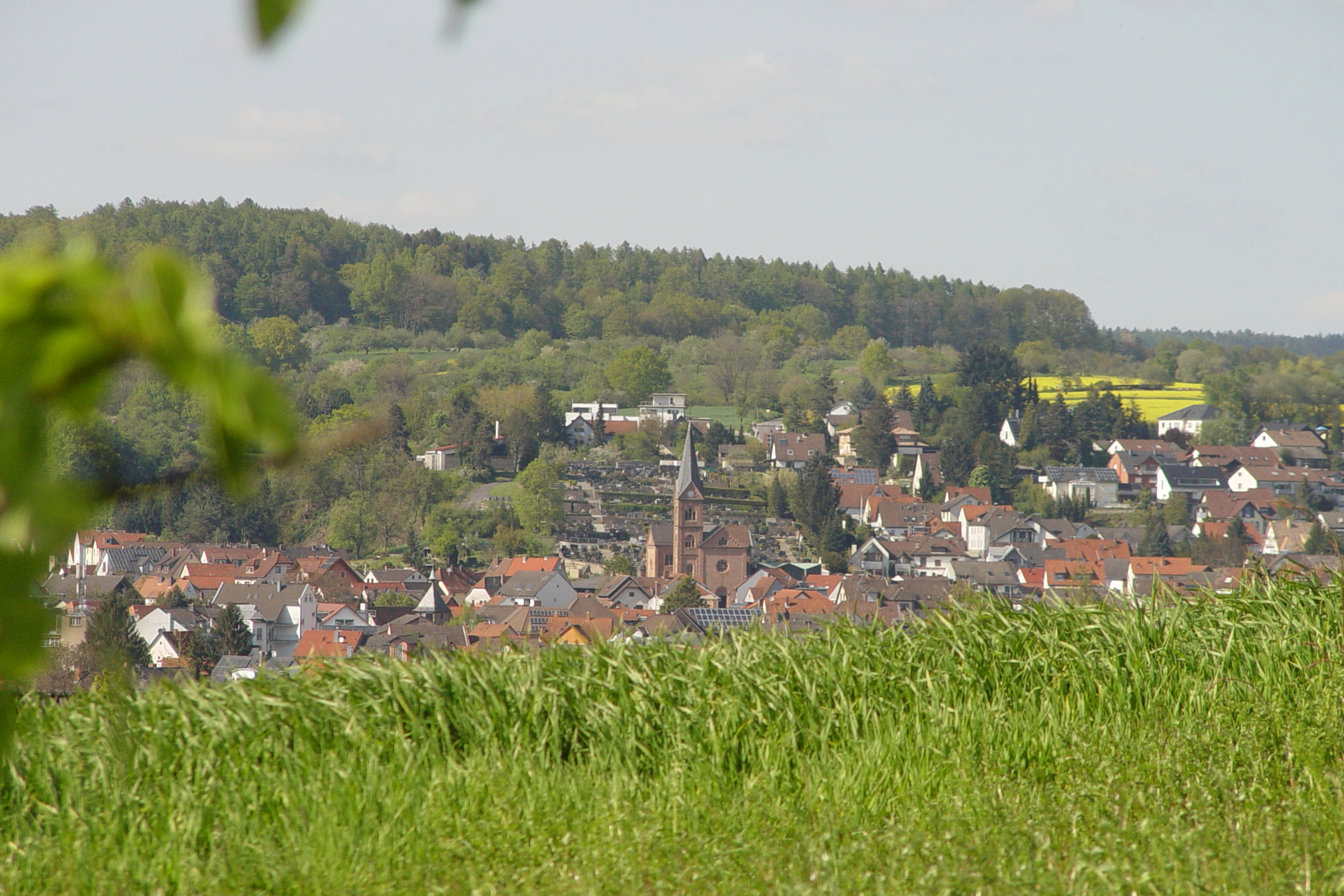
- Goldbach with the Church of Saint Nicholas

- Coat of arms

- Location of Goldbach within Aschaffenburg district
- Interactive map of Goldbach
- Location within Germany Location within Bavaria
- Coordinates: 49°59′20″N 09°11′11″E
- Country: Germany
- State: Bavaria
- Admin. region: Unterfranken
- District: Aschaffenburg

Government
  - Mayor (2020–26): Sandra Rußmann

Area
  - Total: 10.97 km^{2} (4.24 sq mi)
- Elevation: 148 m (486 ft)

Population (2025-12-31)
  - Total: 9,784
  - Density: 891.9/km^{2} (2,310/sq mi)
- Time zone: UTC+01:00 (CET)
  - Summer (DST): UTC+02:00 (CEST)
- Postal codes: 63773
- Dialling codes: 06021
- Vehicle registration: AB
- Website: markt-goldbach.de

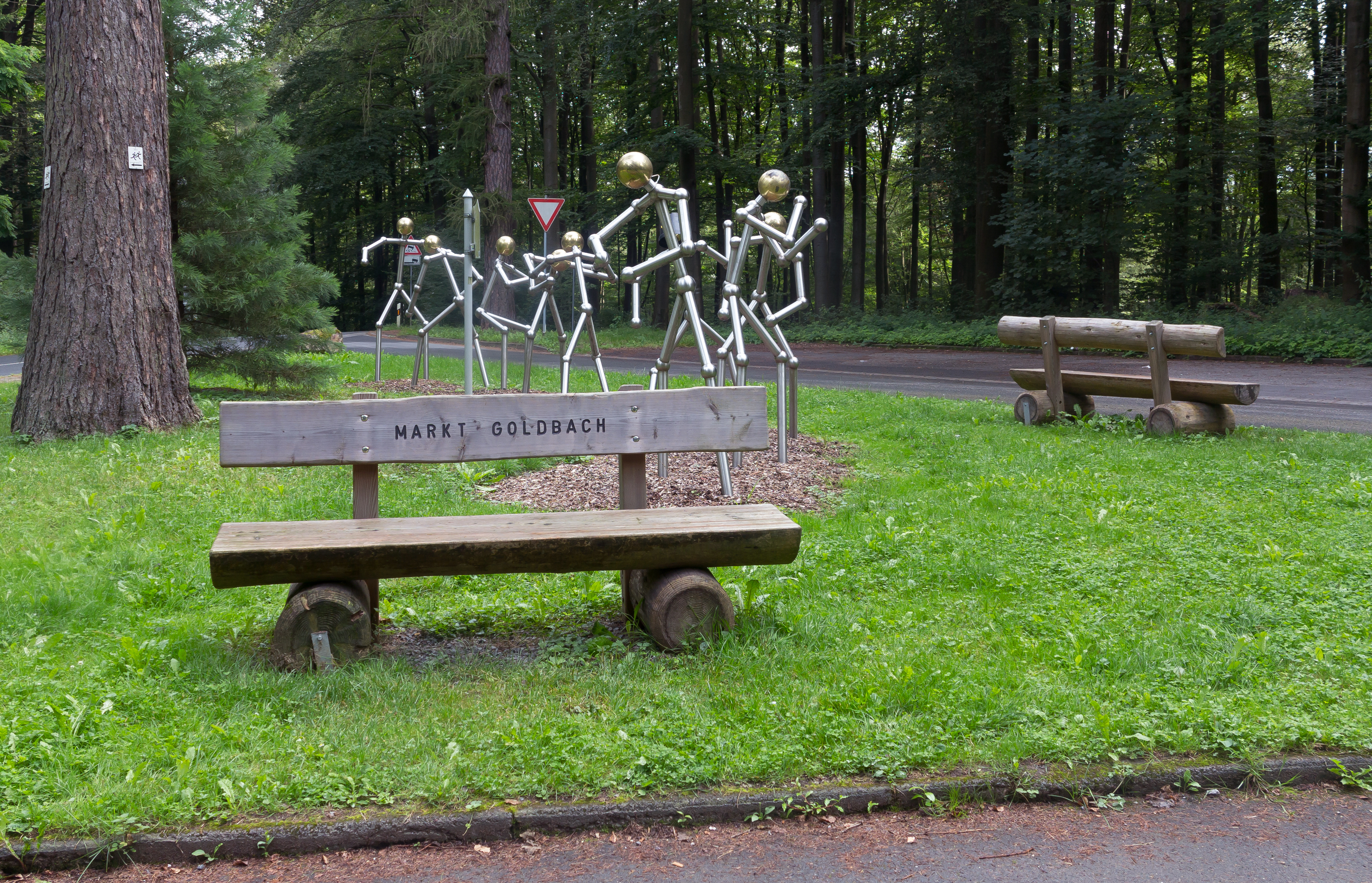
Markt Goldbach, sculpture

Goldbach (German pronunciation: [ˈɡɔltbax]) is a market municipality in the Aschaffenburg district in the Regierungsbezirk of Lower Franconia (Unterfranken) in Bavaria, Germany.

== Geography ==
=== Location ===
Gemeindeteile

The market municipality is one of the most heavily populated municipalities in the Aschaffenburg district and is well known for the "housing" that encloses the Autobahn A 3. It is believed that the name has its roots in the yellow loess soil, which during heavy rainfalls colours the local brook, also called the Goldbach, with a somewhat golden tinge. Gold is also the German word for gold, and Bach means "brook". Supposedly, the place was first called Gelbbach, gelb being the word for "yellow".

=== Gemeindeteile ===
On 1 July 1971, the formerly self-administering municipality of Unterafferbach was amalgamated with Goldbach.

== History ==
In 1218, Goldbach had its first documentary mention. From the mid 15th century, Goldbach was under the authority of the Archbishop of Mainz. In 1814, Goldbach was transferred to Bavaria. On 26 May 1995, Goldbach was granted the designation Markt ("Market").

== Politics ==
=== Municipal council ===
The council is made up of 24 council members, not counting the mayor.

	CSU	SPD	FWG	Total
2008	9	2	13	24 seats

(as at municipal election held on 2 March 2008)

=== Coat of arms ===
The municipality’s arms might be described thus: Gules a bend wavy Or, in chief a noble coronet argent set with colourful stones, in base a wheel spoked of six of the third.

The German blazon describes the coronet as a Laubkrone, or "leaf crown".

The "bend wavy Or" – that is to say, wavy slanted golden stripe – is canting. As explained above, the municipality’s name means "Gold Brook", and this bend is a visual representation of just such a thing. From the 7th to the 11th century, Goldbach belonged to the area of the Frankish royal estate, which is what the crown symbolizes. Until 1803, Goldbach found itself under Electoral Mainz hegemony, a fact recalled by the Wheel of Mainz on the other side of the bend. The tinctures Or and gules (gold and red) are taken from the arms once borne by the Counts of Rieneck, who until they died out in 1559 held the Vogtei as the vassals of the Archbishop of Mainz.

The arms have been borne since 1965.

=== Town partnerships ===
- Courseulles-sur-Mer, Calvados, France since 1994; the commune lies at Juno Beach.

== Culture and sightseeing ==
=== Churches ===
Goldbach has two Catholic parish churches. The alte Kirche ("old church"), as Saint Nicholas’s Church (St. Nikolaus-Kirche) is called, is found in the old village centre. The sandstone Romanesque Revival church that exists today was built in 1894 and 1895 on the spot where once there was an older building that had become too small. The newer church was later enlarged by adding a modern annex.

In the west of the municipality, which at the time was a new development area, the modern church St. Maria Immaculata was consecrated in 1961, as Saint Nicholas’s had itself become too small to accommodate the municipality’s growing numbers. The plain clinker-brick building with a 37 m-tall asymmetrical tower seats 600. The chancel is graced by a monumental painting by the artist Curd Lessig as well as by a modern octagonal altar lamp whose ornate glass panes depicts Biblical scenes. One peculiarity of the church is its organ threesome. Besides the main organ with its 36 speaking stops, built in 1964 by the organ building firm Michael Weise, the church also has at its disposal a Baroque organ from 1782 that was thoroughly restored in the early 1980s and a positive organ from Hartwig Späth’s workshop.

At municipality limits with Hösbach, the Evangelical Johanneskirche ("Saint John’s Church") is situated.

=== Sport and clubs ===
In Goldbach, there are sports, cultural, and community organizations. The Winterlaufserie ("Winter Run Series"), organized by TV Goldbach, covers 10 km on each of nine appointed times and attracts participants from outside the region.

Further clubs are VfR Goldbach, AC Bavaria Goldbach, Gesangverein Harmonie Goldbach (singing club), Gesangverein Sängerkranz Goldbach (singing club), KJG St. Nikolaus, KJG St. Maria Immaculata, DJK Goldbach 1985 e.V., MSC Goldbach, KKS Goldbach, BRK Goldbach, Freiwillige Feuerwehr Goldbach (volunteer fire brigade), RG Goldbach, F.W.V. Goldbach.

== Economy and infrastructure ==
=== Transport ===
Goldbach lies right on the A 3 between Frankfurt (roughly 45 km away) and Würzburg (roughly 75 km away). Between Goldbach and Hösbach, when the Autobahn was being widened to six lanes, a "housing" was built over the roadway to reduce the noise pollution.

=== Public institutions ===
On the way out of the municipality, going towards Unterafferbach, is a forest swimming pool. The indoor swimming pool at the elementary school is open to the public in the winter months. Throughout the municipality are 10 playgrounds, 3 football pitches and 2 sport halls.

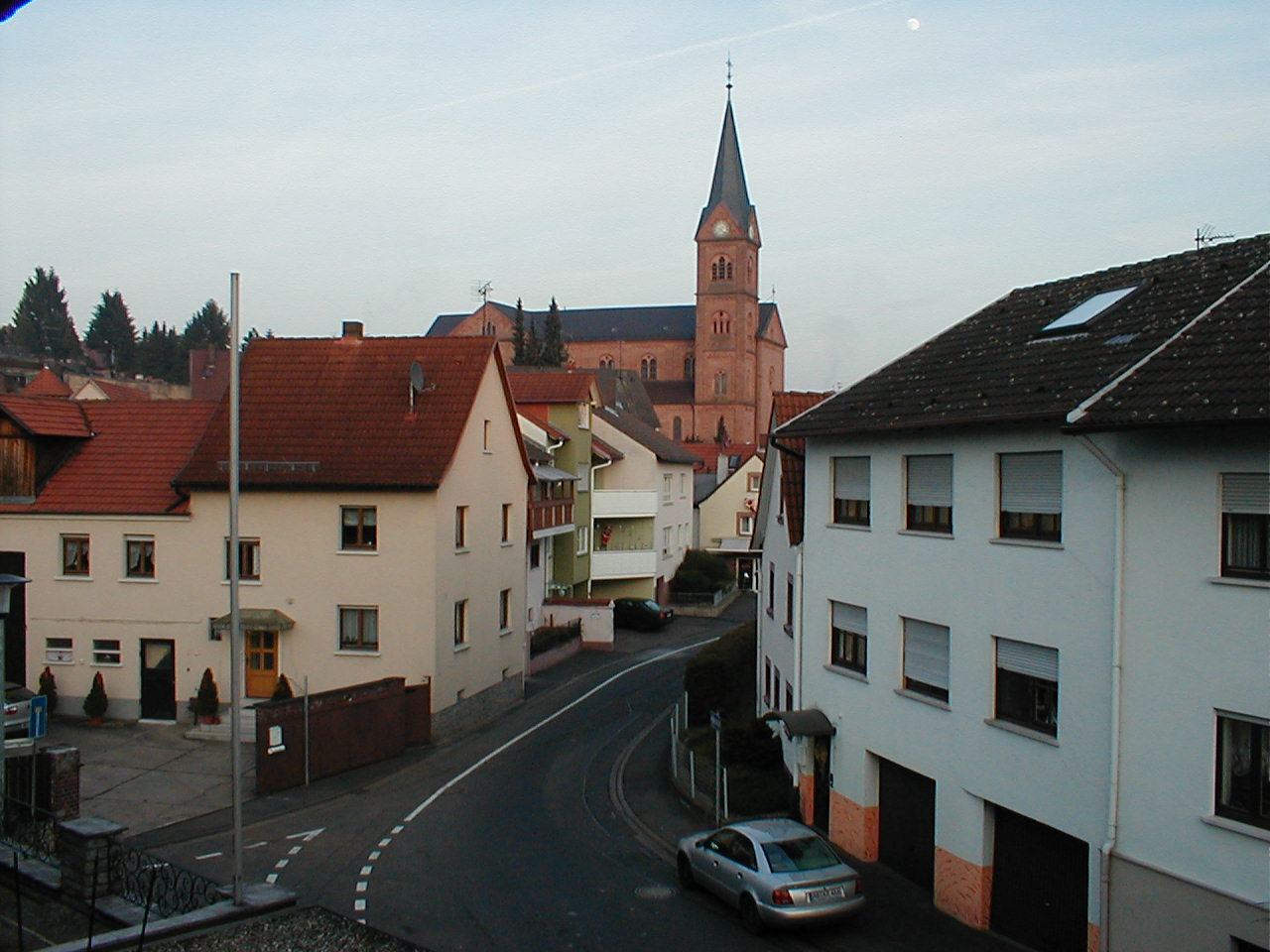
Residential street with the Catholic parish church St. Nikolaus in Goldbach

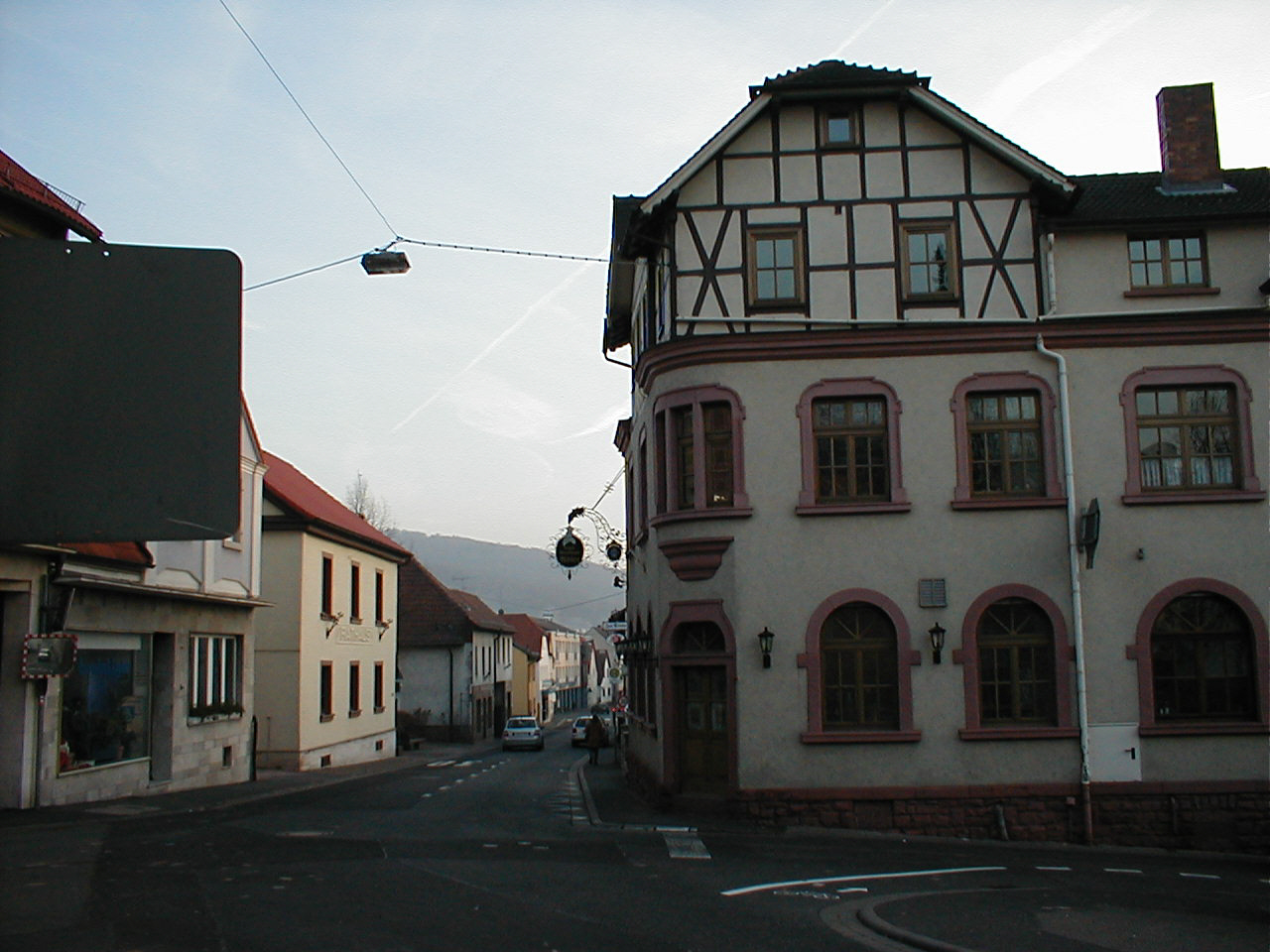
Zum Adler inn in Goldbach

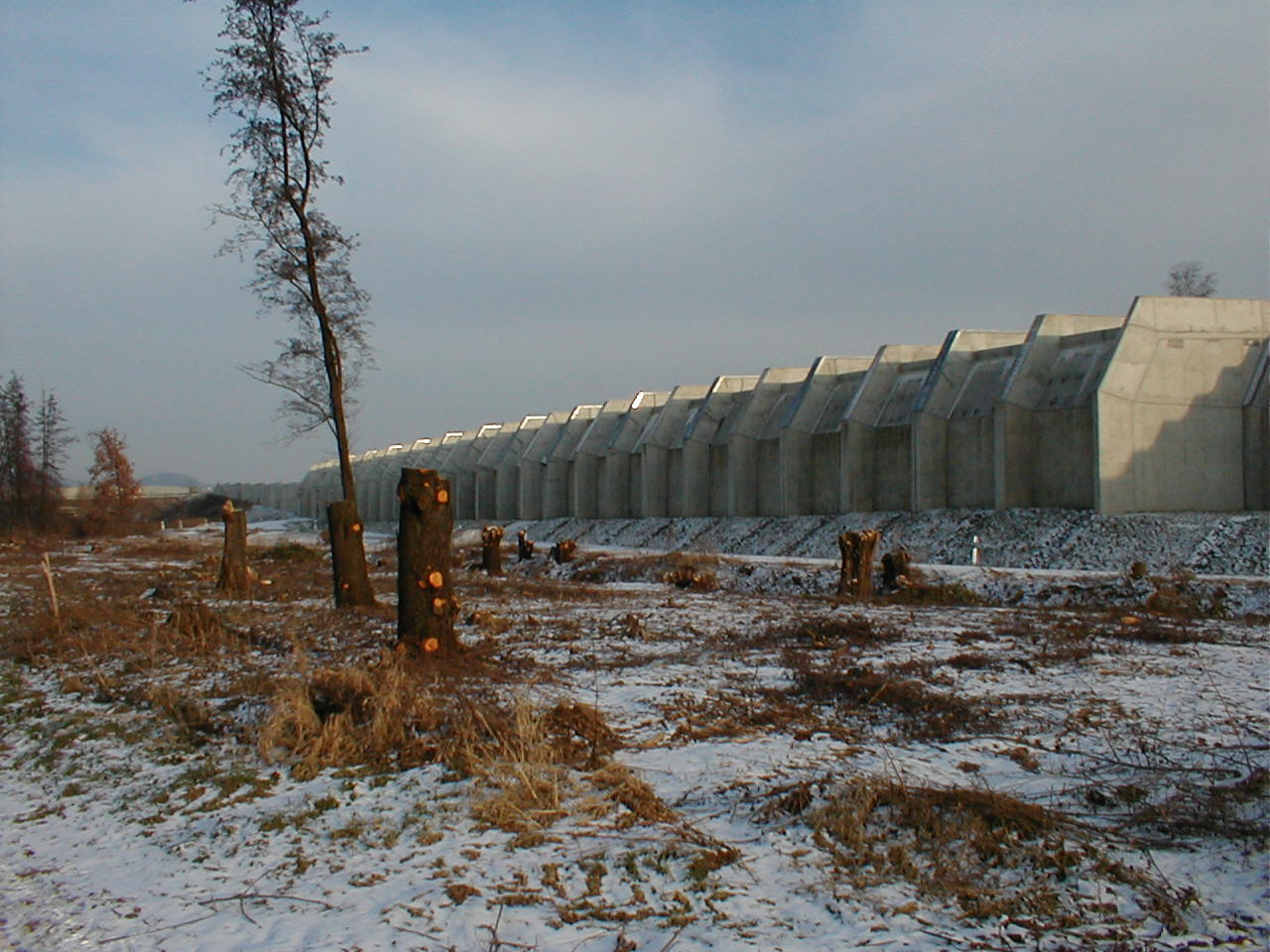
"Housing" on Bundesautobahn 3 near Goldbach
