= Morgan Spurlock Inside Man =

American investigative documentary TV series

- Genre: Documentary
- Directed by: Morgan Spurlock
- Country of origin: United States
- Original language: English
- No. of seasons: 4
- No. of episodes: 30

Production
- Running time: 60 minute
- Production company: Warrior Poets

Original release
- Network: CNN
- Release: June 23, 2013 – August 12, 2016

Morgan Spurlock Inside Man is an American documentary series which aired on CNN. Episodes featured Morgan Spurlock investigating a range of topics from an insider's perspective.

== Overview ==
In each one-hour episode, documentary filmmaker Morgan Spurlock investigated topics of national interest using participatory journalism. Topics explored include marijuana, gun control, migrant farm workers, and elder care. In the premiere episode, Spurlock worked at a medical cannabis dispensary in Oakland, California. In a Season 3 episode, Spurlock used only Bitcoin as currency for a week.

== Reception ==
The first season won the IDA Documentary Award for best limited series. The third series won the CINE Golden Eagle Award for Professional Media, Nonfiction Content.

== Episode list ==
=== Season 1: 2013 ===
No.	Title	Original release date
1	"Marijuana"	23 June 2013
2	"Guns"	30 June 2013
3	"Immigration"	14 July 2013
4	"Education"	21 July 2013
5	"Elder Care"	28 July 2013
6	"Bankruptcy"	11 August 2013
7	"Drought"	18 August 2013
8	"Unions"	25 August 2013

=== Season 2: 2014 ===
No.	Title	Original release date
1	"Celebrity"	13 April 2014
Morgan explores America's obsession with celebrities; from high-speed chases to hunting down the great photo.
2	"Futurism"	20 April 2014
Morgan embarks on a quest to live forever by trying genome hacking and creating an avatar.
3	"Pets"	27 April 2014
Morgan takes a look at America's obsession with pets; from toy dogs in fancy purses to animals in shelters.
4	"Privacy"	4 May 2014
Uncovering the truth about data collecting; Spurlock looks into how much information is kept on him.
5	"The Book of Morgan"	11 May 2014
Morgan Spurlock travels to Nashville, Tenn. to become a guest preacher at an atheist church.
6	"UFOs"	18 May 2014
Morgan Spurlock explores the history, theories, and photographic evidence of UFO sightings.
7	"Income Inequality"	1 June 2014
Morgan Spurlock splits time living with America's richest citizens and the other 99 percent.
8	"Student Athletes"	8 June 2014
Morgan Spurlock visits some of the top college sports programs in the U.S.

=== Season 3: 2015 ===
No.	Title	Original release date
1	"MorganBot"	22 January 2015
Morgan explores the possibilities of a futuristic world where robots make autonomous decisions as he attempts to harness the power of robots and artificial intelligence.
2	"Club Med"	29 January 2015
Morgan takes his shoulder injury from New York City to Bumrungrad Hospital in Bangkok, Thailand as he looks for a better alternative to America's medical care system.
3	"Morgan See, Morgan Do"	5 February 2015
Morgan gets an insiders perspective on the lives of animals in zoo captivity and explores the future of these attractions.
4	"Morgan the Matchmaker"	12 February 2015
Morgan aims to learn how people find love in the 21st century as he tries several online dating sites and apps including Three Day Rule, OK Cupid, and Grindr.
5	"Morgan Makes 'Cents' Out of Bitcoin"	19 February 2015
Determined to understand the ins and outs of online digital money, Morgan lives off nothing but the e-currency Bitcoin for a week to figure out whether the world is ready for a new kind of money.
6	"United States of Trash"	26 February 2015
Morgan learns what it means to throw something away by following his own trash; an inside look into the waste management industry, from the NYC Department of Sanitation to local trash in landfills.
7	"Honey, Bee-Ware"	12 March 2015
Morgan becomes a commercial beekeeper to investigate the mysterious disappearance of the honey bees; what he uncovers is a web of international honey laundering schemes.
8	"Ranger Spurlock"	19 March 2015
Morgan is joined by his young son, Laken, as he volunteers as a park ranger in Alaska to explore the viability of America's national parks in the face of a changing world.

=== Season 4: 2016 ===
No.	Title	Original release date
1	"Double or Nothing"	3 June 2016
Spurlock investigates the gambling industry to find ways to beat the house and double his money. Morgan indulges in a week's worth of professional, Las Vegas gambling to see what makes that world so seductive.
2	"One Giant Step for Morgan"	10 June 2016
Spurlock explores the space industry. Morgan explores the future of space travel and takes in a virtual experience as an astronaut.
3	"CSI: Spurlock"	24 June 2016
Morgan tags along with a forensic unit to understand the difference between how crime scene investigations are really conducted and how TV portrays them.
4	"Game Changers"	5 August 2016
Morgan jumps into the world of pro video gamers; a world where teenage gamers gain fame akin to rock stars and enthusiastic fans pack sold-out arenas.
5	"The Truth About Toxins"	12 August 2016
Morgan gets a detox treatment to rid his body of contaminants, commonly found in food, cleaning products and furniture.
6	"Seek and Disrupt!"	19 August 2016
Morgan looks into companies like Google, AirBnB and Spotify as he attempts to rewrite the rules and fill a void in the marketplace.
