= Holy Hell (film) =

2016 film by Will Allen

- CNN Films poster
- Directed by: Will Allen
- Produced by: Will Allen; Tracey Harnish; Alexandra Johnes
- Cinematography: Polly Morgan; Will Allen
- Edited by: Will Allen; Sean Jarrett
- Music by: Giles Lamb
- Production companies: WRA Productions; CNN Films
- Distributed by: FilmRise
- Release dates: January 25, 2016 (Sundance); May 27, 2016
- Running time: 103 minutes
- Country: United States

Holy Hell is a 2016 American documentary film by Will Allen about his experiences as a member of the Buddhafield cult for 22 years. The cult's leader, who has several names but is typically called Michel, is claimed to have abused his followers. The film uses footage Allen shot during his capacity as the group's videographer and new footage of interviews with former members and of the group in Hawaii.

The film premiered on January 25, 2016 at the 2016 Sundance Film Festival and saw a limited theatrical release in May 2016. It was picked up for broadcast by CNN and aired on September 1, 2016.

It was selected for competition at the Sundance Film Festival.

== Background ==
When Will Allen, then 22, was forced to leave home in 1985 after his mother learned he was gay, his sister invited him to join a local alternative community and meditation group in West Hollywood, California she had been attending for nine months.

The group, led by Michel Rostand, eventually grew to one hundred members and began calling itself Buddhafield. Michel, born Jaime Gomez, was the son of a wealthy Venezuelan rancher; Michel had traveled to Hollywood in search of stardom. Michel landed a nonspeaking role in 1968's Rosemary's Baby, purportedly danced with Oakland Ballet, and apparently participated in adult films.

A film school graduate, Allen became Michel's documentarian and, as it is often described, propaganda minister. The group relocated to Austin, Texas in 1992 and then to Oahu, Hawaii. Allen left the group in 2007, after 22 years. In 2016, 85 or more followers remained with Michel in Hawaii.

== Production ==
After leaving the group in 2007, Allen suffered a crisis and felt directionless. He attended the Sundance Film Festival, where he viewed films including Keep the Lights On. He felt he found a new community, and "thankful to see someone take their own life and put it up on-screen," he sought to do the same with his experiences in Buddhafield. He created Holy Hell over four years.

Allen left much of his footage with the group and had only 35 hours of edited footage of Buddhafield. He used this footage to create the documentary. Cinematographer Polly Morgan shot new footage of Michel and his followers in Hawaii by hiding in bushes, which she described as the greatest challenge in shooting the documentary. For this, she preferred small, inexpensive, and lightweight cameras that would be non-obstructive during filming, and she noted she used a 70-200mm zoom lens for long lens photography while hiding in the bushes. The production also filmed new interviews with former members of the cult.

== Release ==
Holy Hell premiered at the Temple Theatre on January 25, 2016 during the Sundance Film Festival. The film later saw limited theatrical release on May 27, 2016. It was picked up for broadcast by CNN and aired on September 1, 2016.

== Critical reception ==
The film was selected for competition at the 2016 Sundance Film Festival and 2016 Nashville Film Festival.

== Music used in the documentary ==
The documentary features two popular songs: a cover of "Hooked on a Feeling" by Blue Swede and "Chasing Cars" by Snow Patrol.

"Hooked on a Feeling" plays at the beginning as footage is shown of members of the cult outdoors reaching for the sun in a euphoric and trance-like state as the song's refrain "I'm hooked on a feeling, I'm high on believing" plays on. "Chasing Cars" plays on toward the end of the documentary as ex-members of the cult are seen dancing in a field and while crying.
