= Morgan Spurlock =

American filmmaker (1970–2024)

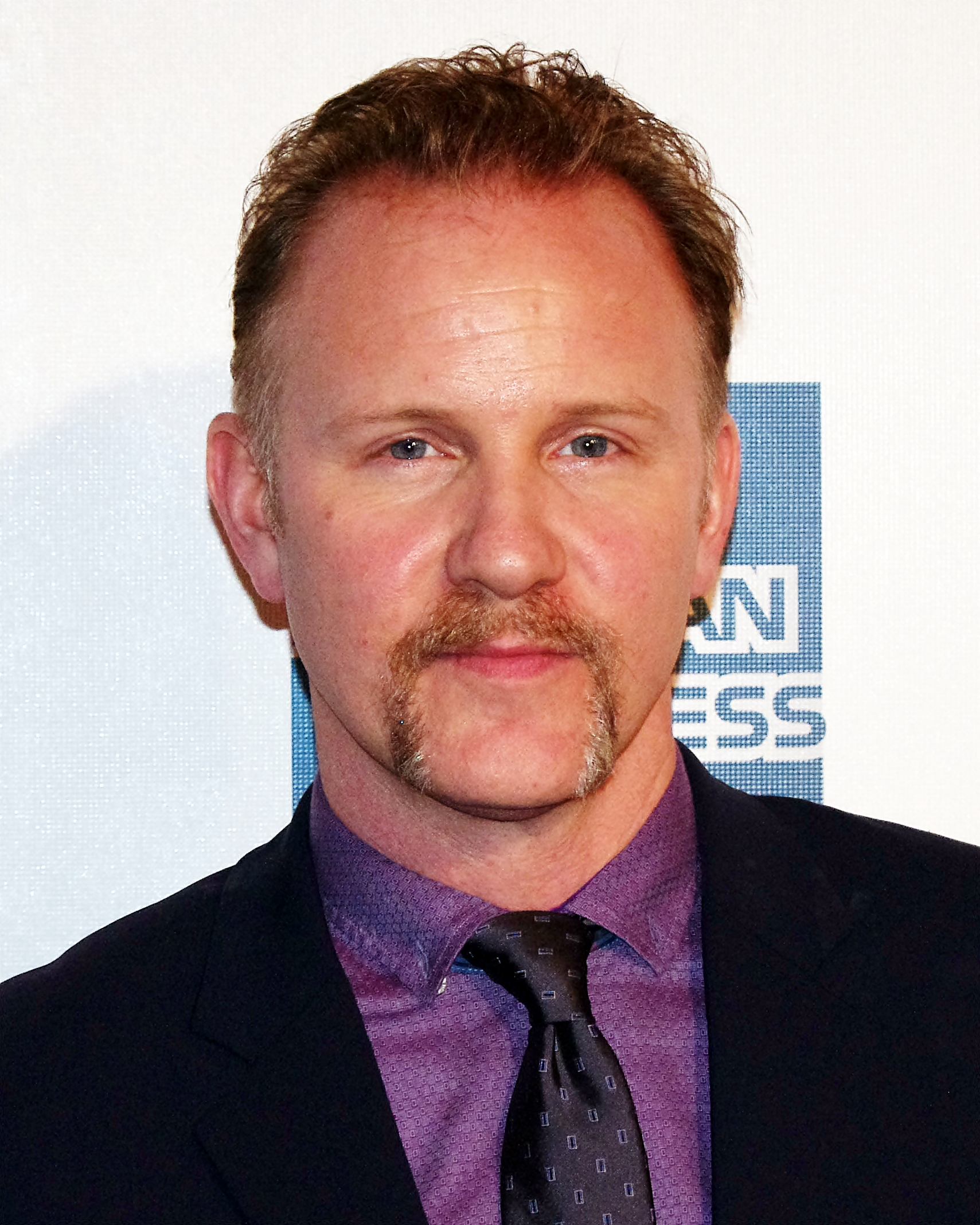
- Spurlock at the 2012 Tribeca Film Festival world premiere of Mansome
- Born: Morgan Valentine Spurlock; November 7, 1970; Parkersburg, West Virginia, U.S.
- Died: May 23, 2024 (aged 53); New York, U.S.
- Education: New York University (BFA)
- Occupations: Film director; television producer; writer
- Years active: 1994–2019
- Spouse(s): Priscilla Sommer (m. 1996; div. 2003) Alex Jamieson (m. 2006; div. 2011) Sara Bernstein (m. 2016; div. 2024)
- Children: 2

Morgan Valentine Spurlock (November 7, 1970 – May 23, 2024) was an American documentary filmmaker, writer and television producer. He directed 23 films and was the producer of nearly 70 films throughout his career. Spurlock received acclaim for directing the documentary Super Size Me (2004), which was nominated for the Academy Award for Best Documentary Feature Film. He produced What Would Jesus Buy? (2007) and directed Where in the World Is Osama bin Laden? (2008), POM Wonderful Presents: The Greatest Movie Ever Sold (2011), Comic-Con Episode IV: A Fan's Hope (2011), and One Direction: This Is Us (2013).

Spurlock was executive producer and star of the reality television series 30 Days (2005–2008). In June 2013, he became the producer and host of the CNN show Morgan Spurlock Inside Man (2013–2016). Spurlock was also the co-founder of the short-film content marketing company Cinelan, which produced the Focus Forward campaign for GE.

The documentary Super Size Me 2: Holy Chicken! was set to be released in 2017, until Spurlock wrote a social media post saying that he had a history of sexual misconduct and referring to himself as "part of the problem", leading to a distribution drop and his resignation from the production company. The film was instead distributed in 2019 by Samuel Goldwyn Films. In 2024, Spurlock died at age 53 due to complications related to cancer.

== Early life ==
Morgan Valentine Spurlock was born to Benjamin and Phyllis Spurlock on November 7, 1970, in Parkersburg, West Virginia. Benjamin owned an auto repair shop, and Phyllis was an English teacher and guidance counselor.

Spurlock and his two older brothers, Craig and Barry, were all raised in Beckley, West Virginia. Ben and Phyllis raised their sons as Methodist, and all three boys attended ballet dance lessons.

Spurlock graduated from Woodrow Wilson High School in Beckley, then attended New York University's Tisch School of the Arts, graduating in 1993 with a BFA in film. He was a member of the fraternity Phi Gamma Delta.

== Career ==
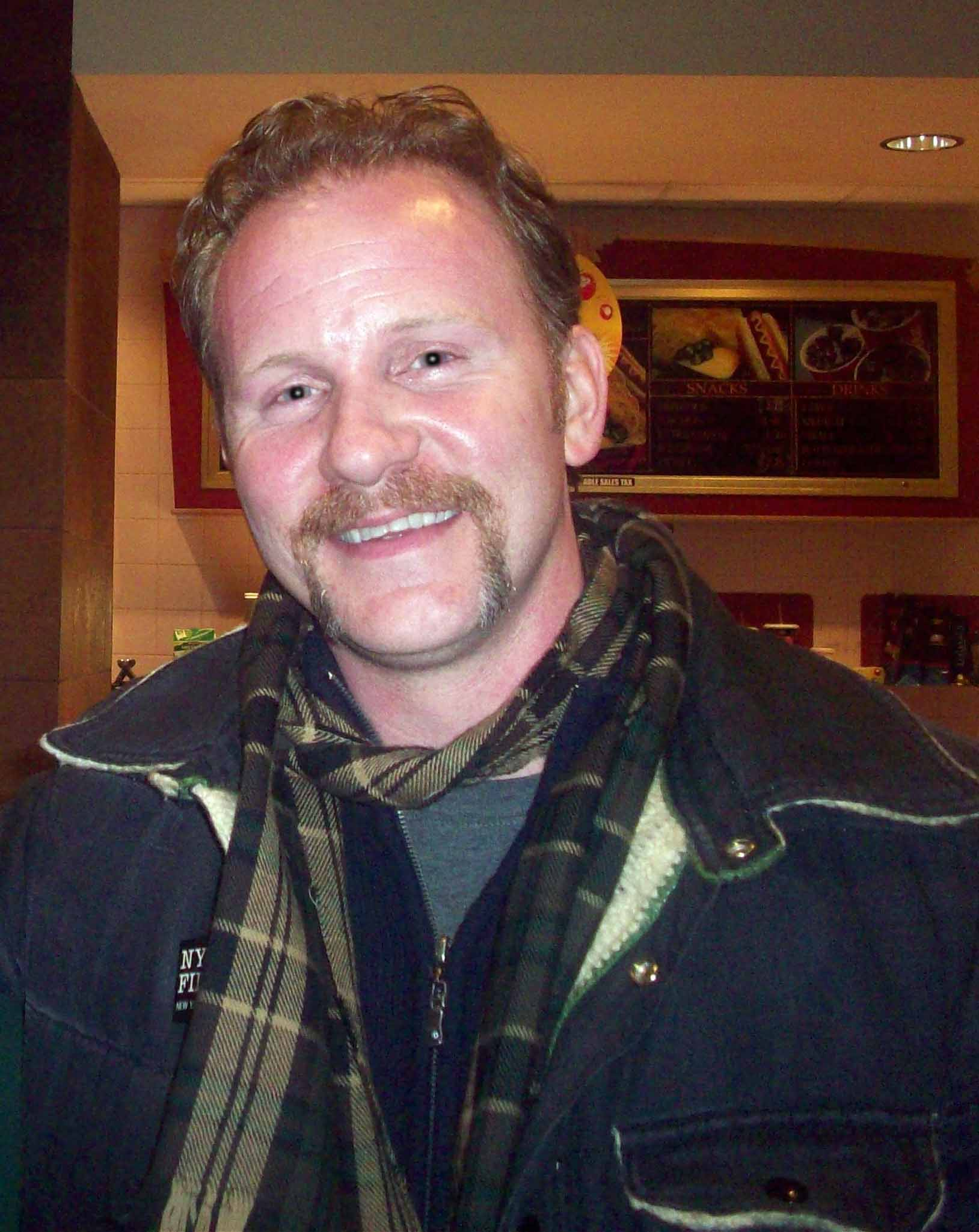
Spurlock at the 2008 Sundance Film Festival

Spurlock was a playwright, winning awards for his play The Phoenix at both the New York International Fringe Festival in 1999 and the Route 66 American Playwriting Competition in 2000. In 2004, Spurlock co-founded the production studio Warrior Poets which would be the production studio for the films he directed and produced for the rest of his career.

The list of documentary films that inspired Spurlock includes Brother's Keeper, Hoop Dreams, The Thin Blue Line, Roger and Me, Harlan County, USA, and The Last Waltz. He considered Brother's Keeper the greatest documentary of all time.

=== Super Size Me ===
Spurlock's documentary Super Size Me was released in the United States on May 7, 2004. He conceived the idea for the film when he was at his parents' house for Thanksgiving, and while watching television saw a news story about a lawsuit brought against McDonald's by two teenage girls who blamed the fast food chain for their obesity. The film was produced for $65,000 and made $22 million in return.

The film depicts an experiment Spurlock conducted in 2003, in which he claimed he ate three McDonald's meals every day, and nothing else, for 30 days, although he later disclosed he also drank copious amounts of alcohol. The film's title derives from one of the rules of Spurlock's experiment: he would not refuse the "super-size" option whenever it was offered to him, but would never ask for it himself. The result, according to Spurlock, was a diet with twice the calories recommended by the USDA. Spurlock attempted to curtail his physical activity to better match the exercise habits of the average American. He previously walked about 3 miles (4.8 km) a day, whereas the average American walks 1.5 miles (2.4 km).

Over the course of filming, Spurlock gained 25 pounds (11 kg), became quite puffy, and suffered liver dysfunction and depression by the end. His supervising physicians noted the effects caused by his high-calorie diet—once even comparing it to a case of severe binge alcoholism. Following Spurlock's December 2017 assertion that he had not been "sober for more than a week" in three decades, the claims of his liver dysfunction being caused by eating McDonald's food solely for 30 days have been called into question. Spurlock also did not publicly release a diet log documenting his diet while filming the documentary.

After completing the project, it took Spurlock 14 months to return to his normal weight of 185 pounds (84 kg). His then-girlfriend, and later wife, Alexandra Jamieson, took charge of his recovery with her "detox diet", which became the basis for her book, The Great American Detox Diet. Super Size Me was later nominated for the Academy Award for Best Documentary Feature and Spurlock won the first Writers Guild of America Award for Best Documentary Screenplay. In 2005, Spurlock wrote a book as a follow-up to Super Size Me titled Don't Eat This Book: Fast Food and the Supersizing of America.

=== 30 Days ===
This series ran on FX between 2005 and 2008. In each episode, a person, sometimes Spurlock himself, or a group of people spent a month immersing themselves in a mode of life markedly different from their norm. For example, a devout Christian living in a Muslim family, or a homophobe staying with a homosexual person. The intent was to give the subject a new perspective, while Spurlock discussed the relevant social issues involved. In the second-season finale, Spurlock spent 25 days locked in jail in Henrico County, Virginia, a county outside of Richmond, to experience life as an inmate.

The third season of 30 Days premiered in June 2008. The first episode of the third season, titled "Working in a Coal Mine", was filmed in Bolt, West Virginia. Bolt is located roughly 18 miles (29 km) from Beckley, West Virginia, where Spurlock was raised.

In 2008, Spurlock signed a deal to develop similar programming with Fox Television Studios.

=== I Bet You Will ===
Spurlock also created I Bet You Will for MTV. I Bet You Will began as a popular Internet webcast of five-minute episodes featuring ordinary people doing stunts in exchange for money. Examples of the scenarios which transpired include eating a full jar of mayonnaise (US$235), eating a "worm burrito" (US$265), and taking shots of corn oil, Pepto-Bismol, lemon juice, hot sauce, cold chicken broth, and cod liver oil (US$450.00 for all nine shots). MTV later bought the show and aired it, which Spurlock hosted.

=== Subsequent films ===
In January 2008, Spurlock's second feature documentary, Where in the World Is Osama Bin Laden? premiered at the Sundance Film Festival. In the film and during interviews, Spurlock explored the fight against terrorism and views the argument from both sides, in which he tries to find Osama bin Laden.

Spurlock directed The Simpsons 20th Anniversary Special – In 3-D! On Ice!.

Freakonomics is an adaptation of the book of the same name by Steven D. Levitt and Stephen J. Dubner, which premiered at the Tribeca Film Festival in April 2010 and had a theatrical release later that year. Spurlock was at the helm of this project alongside five directors, Heidi Ewing, Rachel Grady, Alex Gibney, Seth Gordon, and Eugene Jarecki. Spurlock's segment dealt with people with unusual names.

The one-hour documentary Committed: The Toronto International Film Festival premiered on AMC on October 12, 2010.

The Greatest Movie Ever Sold is a 2011 documentary film about product placement, marketing, and advertising which was reportedly itself financed through product placement. The Greatest Movie Ever Sold premiered at the Sundance Film Festival in January 2011. In the United States, the film had a limited release, opening on April 22, 2011, in New York City, Los Angeles, San Francisco, Chicago, Washington D.C., Boston, Philadelphia, San Diego, Phoenix, and Austin, Texas. Six days later, the film opened the 2011 Hot Docs Canadian International Documentary Festival.

In mid-2010, Spurlock worked with Buffy the Vampire Slayer creator Joss Whedon, Ain't It Cool News founder Harry Knowles, and comic book creator Stan Lee to create the documentary Comic-Con Episode IV: A Fan's Hope, to cover the stories of convention fans. Whedon, Lee, and Knowles served as executive producers. Legendary Pictures' Thomas Tull, who independently financed the documentary, told Variety, "We look forward to capturing the spirit, energy and people that Comic-Con has infused into legions of fans, bringing these audiences and projects out of the halls and onto a world stage."

Spurlock's documentary Mansome was announced on March 8, 2012, as a Spotlight selection for the Tribeca Film Festival. The film takes a comedic look at male identity as defined through men's grooming habits featuring celebrity and expert commentary.

Spurlock hosted and produced the CNN series Morgan Spurlock Inside Man, which aired from June 2013 to August 2016.

Spurlock helped distribute A Brony Tale, a documentary directed by Brent Hodge on the brony phenomenon and on the musician and voice acting career of Ashleigh Ball. The film was selected for theatrical distribution under the label Morgan Spurlock Presents. The film was released in theaters on July 8, 2014.

Spurlock teamed up with Hodgee Films again on the 2015 web series Consider the Source, in association with Disney's Maker Studios.

While attending a screening of the movie Catfish, Spurlock approached the film's producers afterwards and called Catfish "the best fake documentary" he had ever seen.

=== Other work ===
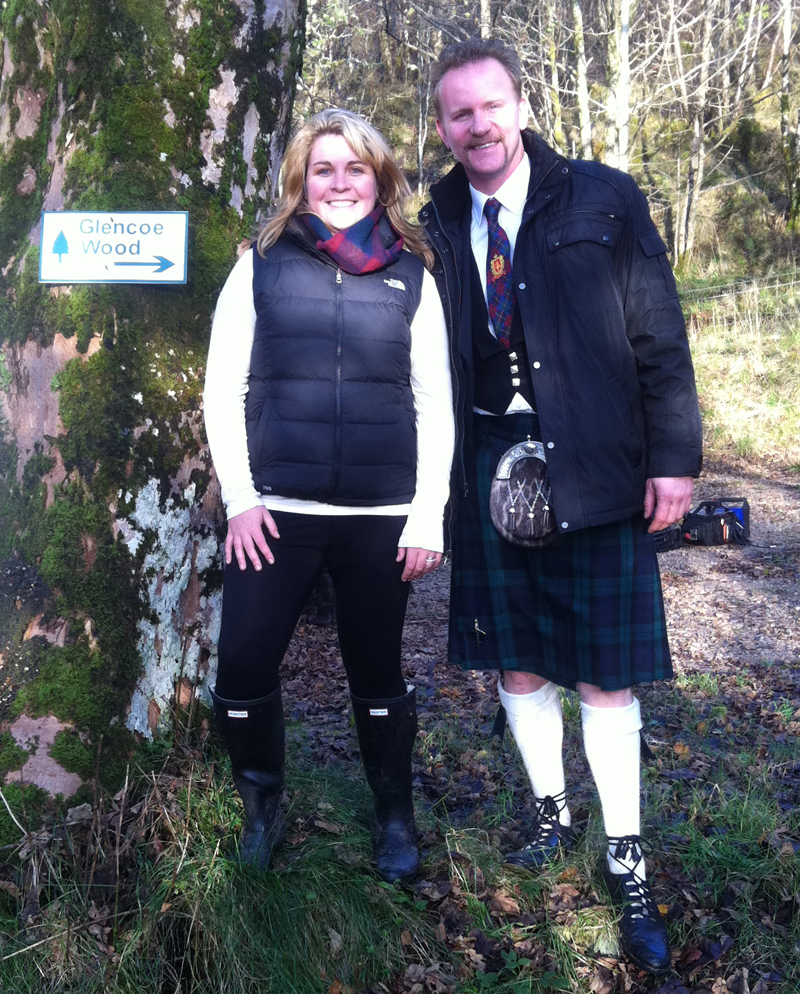
Morgan Spurlock with Highland Titles in Scotland during filming Morgan Spurlock's New Britannia

- Spurlock presented 50 Documentaries to See Before You Die on Current TV. The show premiered on August 1, 2011.
- Spurlock's half-hour documentary series A Day in the Life was to debut on Hulu in mid-August 2011. It follows "incredibly focused" people such as Richard Branson and will.i.am for a full day. The series is exclusive to Hulu.
- Spurlock was the presenter of a show in the UK on Sky Atlantic entitled Morgan Spurlock's New Britannia. This was a comedy based around the differences between the UK and the US.
- Spurlock directed the 3D concert film One Direction: This Is Us, starring the English-Irish boy band One Direction, and released on August 30, 2013, by TriStar Pictures.

=== Sexual misconduct and resignation ===
In December 2017, Spurlock wrote a blog post admitting to what he described as a history of sexual misconduct. In the midst of the #MeToo movement, Spurlock stated: "I've come to understand after months of these revelations, that I am not some innocent bystander, I am also a part of the problem." In the post, he said that he committed sexual misconduct in his past, including being "unfaithful to every wife and girlfriend [he] ever had". Spurlock recounts settling a sexual harassment allegation, brought by his assistant at his production company, Warrior Poets, for verbal harassment including yelling for her as "hot pants" or "sex pants" from across the office.

In the same post, Spurlock also recounted that he had been accused of sexual assault while in college. Spurlock wrote that while still "in college, a girl who I hooked up with on a one night stand accused me of rape. Not outright. There were no charges or investigations, but she wrote about the instance in a short story writing class and called me by name." He wrote: "This wasn't how I remembered it at all [...] She believed she was raped. That's why I'm part of the problem." Spurlock said both he and the woman had been heavily drinking the night of the incident, and that during sex she had begun crying, and they had stopped.

After publishing his blog post, Spurlock stepped down from his position with Warrior Poets, the company he had co-founded in 2004. The move ended his career as a documentary filmmaker. Spurlock told the Associated Press in 2019: "For me, there was a moment of kind of realization—as somebody who is a truth-teller and somebody who has made it a point of trying to do what's right—of recognizing that I could do better in my own life. We should be able to admit we were wrong." Additionally, he told Deadline: "Part of the reason I wrote that essay in the first place was to be on the right side of it. I'm hopeful that in time, with the work that I do and the changes that I continue to go through, that I can be there on the right side."

In the blog post, Spurlock further disclosed that he had been the victim of sexual abuse as a boy and teenager, and that he had "consistently been drinking since the age of 13."

Spurlock released a sequel film, Super Size Me 2: Holy Chicken!, in 2017, to be distributed by YouTube Red, but it was dropped following Spurlock's admission of sexual misconduct. Samuel Goldwyn Films instead distributed the film in September 2019. In October 2022, The Washington Post reported that Spurlock had "suffered career death" as a result of his misconduct.

== Personal life and death ==
Spurlock was of Ulster Scot and English descent. Although he was raised Methodist, he stated in a 2014 interview with TV Guide that he had become agnostic. In December 2017, he revealed that he had been sexually abused as a child.

Spurlock was married three times—to Priscilla Sommer, Alexandra Jamieson, and Sara Bernstein. All three marriages ended in divorce. He had two sons.

On May 23, 2024, Spurlock died in upstate New York from complications of pancreatic cancer at the age of 53.

== Bibliography ==
- Spurlock, Morgan (2005). Don't Eat This Book: Fast Food and the Supersizing of America. New York, NY: G.P. Putnam's Sons. ISBN 0-399-15260-1.
- Spurlock, Morgan (2008). Where in the World Is Osama Bin Laden?. New York, NY: Random House. ISBN 978-1-4000-6652-0.
- Spurlock, Morgan (2011). Comic-Con Episode IV: A Fan's Hope. DK. p. 192. ISBN 978-0756683429.

== Filmography ==
=== Films ===
Year	Film	Role	Notes
1994	Léon: The Professional		Production assistant: New York
1995	Kiss of Death		Office production assistant
2004	Super Size Me	Himself	Director, screenwriter
2004	The Future of Food		Executive producer
2004	Czech Dream		Executive producer
2006	Chalk		Executive producer
2006	Class Act		Executive producer
2007	Drive Thru	Robbie, The Hella-Burger Manager	
2007	The Third Wave		Executive producer
2007	What Would Jesus Buy?		Producer
2008	Where in the World Is Osama Bin Laden?	Himself	Director, writer
2008	Last Cup: Road to the World Series of Beer Pong		Executive producer
2009	The Entrepreneur		Executive producer
2009	Simply Raw: Reversing Diabetes in 30 Days	Himself	
2009	New Brow: Contemporary Underground Art	Himself	
2009	Abraham Obama	Himself	
2010	Freakonomics	Himself	Director, writer (segment "A Roshanda by Any Other Name"), narrator
2010	Pool Party		Executive producer
2011	POM Wonderful Presents: The Greatest Movie Ever Sold	Himself	Director, executive producer, writer
2011	Comic-Con Episode IV: A Fan's Hope		Director, writer, producer
2011	The Other F Word		Executive producer
2011	How We Covered It	Himself	
2011	The Unauthorized Documentary, The Hangover Part II	Himself	
2012	Mansome	Himself	Director, writer, producer
2012	Knuckleball!		Executive producer
2012	Glue Man	Himself	Stars
2013	One Direction: This Is Us		Director, producer
2013	Web Junkie		Executive producer
2013	Dancing in Jaffa		Executive producer
2013	Waiting for Mamu		Executive producer
2013	Chronic-Con, Episode 420: A New Dope	Himself	
2013	You Don't Know Jack		Director, writer
2013	Misfire: The Rise and Fall of the Shooting Gallery	Himself	
2014	A Brony Tale		Executive producer
2014	I Am Santa Claus		Executive producer
2014	We the Economy: 20 Short Films You Can't Afford to Miss		Director, producer
2014	That Film About Money		Executive producer
2015	Man Under		Executive producer
2015	Censored Voices		Executive producer
2015	Made in Japan		Executive producer
2015	I Am Dale Earnhardt	Himself	
2015	Crafted		Director
2015	The Princess of North Sudan		Producer
2016	Rats		Director, writer
2016	The Eagle Huntress		Executive producer
2017	Tough Guys		Executive producer
2017	No Man's Land		Executive producer
2017	Good After Bad		Executive producer
2017	Super Size Me 2: Holy Chicken!	Himself	Director, writer, producer

=== Television ===
Year	Show	Role	Notes
2002	I Bet You Will	Host	TV series
2004	Last Laugh '04	Himself	Not credited, TV movie
2004	Know Your Enemy: Al Qaeda's Third Wave		Executive producer, TV movie
2005	The 50 Greatest Documentaries	Himself	TV movie
2005	Merry F %$in' Christmas	Himself	TV movie
2005	30 Days	Himself	Creator, Executive producer, host
2010	The Simpsons 20th Anniversary Special – In 3-D! On Ice!	Himself	Director
2011	A Day in the Life		Director, Executive producer
2012	Morgan Spurlock's New Britannia	Himself	Writer, host
2013	Morgan Spurlock Inside Man	Himself	Director, writer, Executive producer
2013	Losing It with John Stamos		Creator, Executive producer
2014	7 Deadly Sins	Host	Executive producer, Creator
2018	Hell's Kitchen	Himself	Chef's table guest diner for the red team; Episode: "Hell Freezes Over"
