= Fathead =

Fathead may refer to:

== Company ==
- Fathead (brand), a graphics company specializing in sports decorations and custom wall graphics

== Fish ==
- Fathead carp
- Fathead minnow
- Fathead sculpin
- Cubiceps
- Semicossyphus pulcher of the family Labridae
- Psychrolutes microporos of the family Psychrolutidae

== Music ==
- David "Fathead" Newman (1933-2009), American jazz and R&B saxophonist
  - Fathead (album), Newman's debut release
- Fathead (musician) (c. 1960–1988), Jamaican dance hall deejay
- Fathead (band), Canadian blues band

== Other uses ==
- Fat Head, a documentary criticizing Super Size Me and seeking to refute the lipid hypothesis
- The Fatheads, a show within a show on Rocko's Modern Life
