= Super Size Me =

2004 documentary film by Morgan Spurlock

- Theatrical release poster
- Directed by: Morgan Spurlock
- Written by: Morgan Spurlock
- Produced by: Morgan Spurlock
- Starring: Morgan Spurlock; Alexandra Jamieson
- Cinematography: Scott Ambrozy
- Edited by: Julie "Bob" Lombardi
- Music by: Steve Horowitz
- Production company: The Con
- Distributed by: Samuel Goldwyn Films; Roadside Attractions
- Release date: May 7, 2004
- Running time: 98 minutes
- Country: United States
- Language: English
- Budget: $65,000
- Box office: $22.2 million

Super Size Me is a 2004 American documentary film directed by and starring Morgan Spurlock, an American independent filmmaker. Spurlock's film follows a 30-day period from February 1 to March 2, 2003, during which he claimed to consume only McDonald's food, although he later disclosed he was also abusing alcohol. The film documents the drastic change on Spurlock's physical and psychological health and well-being. It also explores the fast food industry's corporate influence, including how it encourages poor nutrition for its own profit and gain.

Spurlock ate at McDonald's restaurants three times a day, consuming every item on the chain's menu at least once. Spurlock claimed to have consumed an average of 20.9 megajoules or 5,000 kcal (the equivalent of 9.26 Big Macs) per day during the experiment. He also walked about 2 kilometers (1.5 miles) a day. An intake of around 2,500 kcal within a healthy balanced diet is more generally recommended for a man to maintain his weight. At the end of the experiment the then-32-year-old Spurlock had gained 24.5 pounds (11.1 kg), a 13% body mass increase, increased his cholesterol to 230 mg/dL (6.0 mmol/L), and experienced mood swings, sexual dysfunction, and fat accumulation in his liver.

The reason for Spurlock's investigation was the increasing spread of obesity throughout US society, which the surgeon general has declared an "epidemic", and the corresponding lawsuit brought against McDonald's on behalf of two overweight girls, who, it was alleged, became obese as a result of eating McDonald's food (Pelman v. McDonald's Corporation, 237 F. Supp. 2d 512). Spurlock argued that, although the lawsuit against McDonald's failed (and subsequently many state legislatures have legislated against product liability actions against producers and distributors of "fast food"), as well as the McLibel case, much of the same criticism leveled against the tobacco companies applies to fast food franchises whose product is both physiologically addictive and physically harmful.

The film prompted widespread debate about American eating habits and has since come under scrutiny for the accuracy of its science and the truthfulness of Spurlock's on-camera claims. In 2017 Spurlock admitted to rampant undisclosed alcohol abuse during the course of the experiment.

The documentary was nominated for an Academy Award for Best Documentary Feature, and won Best Documentary Screenplay from the Writers Guild of America. Dark Horse Comics subsequently published a comic book related to the movie, containing stories based on numerous cases of fast food health scares.

Spurlock released a sequel, Super Size Me 2: Holy Chicken!, in 2017.

== Synopsis ==
As the film begins, Spurlock is in above-average physical shape, according to his personal trainer. He is seen by three physicians (cardiologist Stephen Siegel, gastroenterologist/hepatologist Lisa Ganjhu, and general practitioner Daryl Isaacs), as well as a nutritionist and a personal trainer. All of the health professionals predict the "McDiet" will have unwelcome effects on his body, but none expect anything too drastic, as his cardiologist Dr. Stephen Siegel cites the human body as being "extremely adaptable". Prior to the experiment, Spurlock ate a varied diet but always had vegan evening meals to accommodate his girlfriend, Alexandra, a vegan chef. At the beginning of the experiment, Spurlock, who stood 6 feet 2 inches (188 cm) tall, had a body weight of 185 pounds (84 kg).

=== Experiment ===
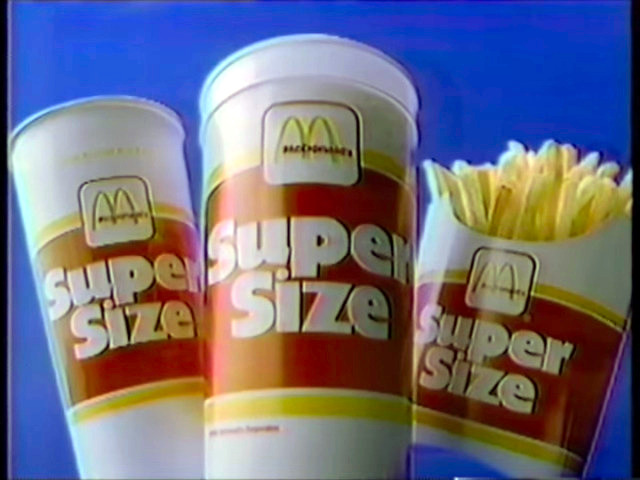
In the experiment, Spurlock must upgrade his portion to Super Size if it is suggested by the cashier.

Spurlock made rules for himself governing his eating habits:

- He will fully eat three McDonald's meals daily: breakfast, lunch, and dinner.
- He will consume every item on the McDonald's menu at least once over the course of the 30 days (he managed this in nine days).
- He will ingest only items offered on the McDonald's menu, including bottled water. All outside consumption of food is prohibited. By his own admission Spurlock violated this rule, as he consumed copious amounts of alcohol during the experiment.
- He will Super Size the meal if offered (as upselling), but not by his own request. (He Supersized a total of nine times, five times while in Texas and four times while in New York).
- He will attempt to walk about as much as a typical United States citizen, based on a suggested figure of 5,000 standardized distance steps per day, but he did not closely adhere to this, as he walked more while in New York than in Houston.

On February 1, Spurlock started the month with breakfast near his home in Manhattan, where there were an average of four McDonald's locations (and 66,950 residents, with twice as many commuters) per square mile (2.6 km²). He aimed to keep the distances he walked in line with the 5,000 steps (approximately 2 miles (3.2 km)) walked per day by the average American.

The second day brought Spurlock's first (of nine) Super Sized meals, which he ate at the McDonald's on 34th Street and Tenth Avenue. It consisted of a Double Quarter Pounder with Cheese, Super Size French fries, and a 42-ounce Coca-Cola, which took him 22 minutes to eat. He experienced steadily increasing stomach discomfort during the process, and then finally vomited in the McDonald's parking lot.

After five days, Spurlock gained 9.5 pounds (4.3 kg) (from 185.5 to about 195 pounds). It was not long before he found himself experiencing depression, and he claimed that his bouts of it, along with lethargy and headaches, could be relieved by eating a McDonald's meal. His gastroenterologist, Dr. Lisa Ganjhu, described him as being "addicted". At his second weigh-in he had gained another 8 pounds (3.6 kg), putting his weight at 203.5 pounds (92.3 kg). By the end of the month he weighed about 210 pounds (95 kg), an increase of about 24.5 pounds (11.1 kg). Because he only wanted to eat McDonald's food, Spurlock refused to take any medication at all. At one weigh-in, Spurlock had lost 1 lb. from the previous weigh-in, and a nutritionist hypothesized that he had lost muscle mass, which weighs more than an identical volume of fat. At another weigh-in a nutritionist said Spurlock had gained 17 pounds (7.7 kg) in 12 days.

Spurlock's then-girlfriend, Alexandra Jamieson, attested to the fact that Spurlock lost much of his energy and sex drive during his experiment. It was not clear at the time whether or not Spurlock would be able to complete the entire month of the high-fat, high-carbohydrate diet, and his family and friends began to express concern.

On day 21, Spurlock had heart palpitations and liver damage. His internist, Dr. Daryl Isaacs, advised him to stop what he was doing immediately to avoid any serious health problems. He compared Spurlock with the protagonist played by Nicolas Cage in the movie Leaving Las Vegas, who intentionally drinks himself to death in a matter of weeks. Despite this warning Spurlock decided to continue the experiment.

On March 2, Spurlock reached day 30 and achieved his goal. His physicians were surprised at the degree of deterioration in Spurlock's health. He noted that he has eaten as many McDonald's meals as most nutritionists say the ordinary person should eat in eight years. (He ate 90 meals, which is close to the number of meals consumed once a month in an eight-year period.)

=== Findings ===
The documentary's end text states that it took Spurlock five months to lose 20.1 pounds (9.1 kg) and another nine months to lose the last 4.5 pounds (2.0 kg). His then-girlfriend Alex, now his ex-wife, began supervising his recovery with a vegan "detox diet", which became the basis for her book The Great American Detox Diet.

The movie ends with a rhetorical question, "Who do you want to see go first, you or them?" This is accompanied by a cartoon tombstone, which reads "Ronald McDonald (1954–2012)", which originally appeared in The Economist in an article addressing the ethics of marketing to children.

A short epilogue showed that the salads can contain even more fat and calories than burgers if the customer adds liberal amounts of cheese and dressing before consumption. It also described McDonald's discontinuation of the Super Size option six weeks after the movie's premiere, as well as its recent emphasis on healthier menu items such as salads, and the release of the new "Go Active! Adult Happy Meal." McDonald's denied that these changes had anything to do with the film.

== Reception ==
Super Size Me premiered at the 2004 Sundance Film Festival, where Morgan Spurlock won the Grand Jury Prize for directing the film. The film opened in the US on May 7, 2004, and grossed a total of $11,536,423 worldwide, making it the 7th highest-grossing documentary film of all time. It was nominated for an Academy Award for Best Documentary Feature, but lost to the film Born into Brothels. It did, however, win the award for Best Documentary Screenplay from the Writers Guild of America.

The film holds a 92% rating on the film review aggregator Rotten Tomatoes based on 171 reviews, with an average rating of 7.73/10. The consensus calls the film an "entertaining doc about the adverse effects of eating fast food." Metacritic assigned the film a weighted average score of 73 out of 100, based on 37 critics.

Super Size Me received two thumbs up on At the Movies with Ebert and Roeper. Caroline Westbrook for BBC News stated that the hype for the documentary was proper "to a certain extent", because of its serious message, and that, overall, the film's "high comedy factor and over-familiarity of the subject matter render it less powerful than other recent documentaries – but it still makes for enjoyable, thought-provoking viewing." One reviewer said "he's telling us something everyone already knows: Fast food is bad for you."

Robert Davis of Paste criticized the film as being more of a publicity stunt than a documentary arguing that Spurlock took a dramatic and unscientific approach, citing ignoring his nutritionist and eating excessively as examples. He also argued that this overshadowed the potentially more compelling story of how the fast-food industry has engineered bland, unhealthy, and nutritionally inadequate food which lacks vegetables and fiber.

McDonald's UK responded that the author intentionally consumed an average of 5,000 calories per day and did not exercise, and that the results would have been the same regardless of the source of overeating.

=== Counter-claims ===
In his reply documentary Fat Head, Tom Naughton "suggests that Spurlock's calorie and fat counts don't add up" and noted Spurlock's refusal to publish the Super Size Me food log. The Houston Chronicle reports: "Unlike Spurlock, Naughton has a page on his Web site that lists every item (including nutritional information) he ate during his fast-food month."

After eating exclusively at McDonald's for one month, Soso Whaley said, "The first time I did the diet in April 2004, I lost 10 pounds (going from 175 to 165) and lowered my cholesterol from 237 to 197, a drop of 40 points." Of particular note was that she exercised regularly and did not insist on consuming more food than she otherwise would. Despite eating at only McDonald's every day, she maintained her caloric intake at around 2,000 per day.

After John Cisna, a high school science teacher, lost 60 pounds (27 kg) while eating exclusively at McDonald's for 180 days, he said, "I'm not pushing McDonald's. I'm not pushing fast food. I'm pushing taking accountability and making the right choice for you individually... As a science teacher, I would never show Super Size Me because when I watched that, I never saw the educational value in that... I mean, a guy eats uncontrollable amounts of food, stops exercising, and the whole world is surprised he puts on weight? What I'm not proud about is probably 70 to 80 percent of my colleagues across the United States still show Super Size Me in their health class or their biology class. I don't get it."

As a counterpoint, the film features interviews with Big Mac aficionado and record holder Don Gorske, who eats multiple Big Macs each day, yet maintains a healthy weight and cholesterol levels, as well as good mental health.

A 2006 study on fast food consumption by healthy individuals inspired by the documentary showed that, while the heavy diet does affect liver enzymes, it did not show the same dangerous effect shown in the documentary. This suggested that the extreme reaction must have had another cause. In 2017, Spurlock – who previously told his doctors he did not drink – admitted to copious amounts of alcohol consumption during the making of the film. Documentary filmmaker Phelim McAleer questioned whether this may better account for Spurlock's liver issues and other health problems, since he did not change his alcohol intake during the experiment.

== Influence ==
Six weeks after the film's debut, McDonald's discontinued its supersize portions, although they claimed the decision had nothing to do with the film itself. In the United Kingdom, McDonald's publicized a website which included a response to and criticisms of the film. In theaters in the UK, the company placed a brief ad in the film's trailers, pointing to the URL and stating, "See what we disagree with. See what we agree with."

Internationally, Super Size Me was a major success in the box office of Australia. McDonald's in Australia responded with an advertising campaign that included three elements: two advertisements for TV and one produced to be shown in movie theaters.

The film was the inspiration for the BBC television series The Supersizers... in which the presenters dine on historical meals and take medical tests to ascertain the impact on their health.

The film was also the inspiration for the 2007 documentary film Super High Me, directed by Michael Blieden. The film follows Doug Benson, a comedian and cannabis enthusiast, as he becomes the subject to a multitude of tests designed to measure the physical and mental impacts of, first, not smoking cannabis for 30 days, and then smoking non-stop for 30 days. The poster for the movie was modeled after one of the promotional posters from Super Size Me.

The premise of the 2011 documentary Forks Over Knives was to create the "reverse" of Super Size Me, where the film's director "goes on this diet and gets better, instead of getting fatter and sicker".

== See also ==
- Criticism of fast food
- National Weight Control Registry
- New York State Restaurant Association v. New York City Board of Health
- John Banzhaf
- Fast Food Nation
