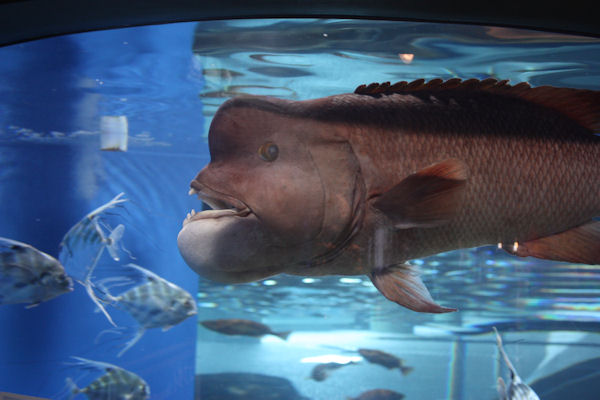

Conservation status
- Data Deficient (IUCN 3.1)

Scientific classification
- Kingdom: Animalia
- Phylum: Chordata
- Class: Actinopterygii
- Division: Teleostei
- Order: Labriformes
- Family: Labridae
- Genus: Bodianus
- Species: B. reticulatus

Binomial name
- Bodianus reticulatus (Valenciennes, 1839)

Synonyms
- Cossyphus reticulatus Valenciennes, 1839; Semicossyphus reticulatus (Valenciennes, 1839)

= Asian sheephead wrasse =

Species of fish

The Asian sheephead wrasse (Bodianus reticulatus), also known as kobudai (瘤鯛 or コブダイ) in Japan, is one of the largest species of wrasse. Native to the western Pacific Ocean, it inhabits rocky reef areas and prefers temperate waters around the Korean Peninsula, China and Japan (including the Ogasawara Islands). It can reach 100 cm (39 in) in total length, and the greatest weight recorded is 14.7 kg (32 lb).

== Taxonomy ==
The Asian sheephead wrasse, as the common name indicates, is a wrasse, and thus belongs to the family Labridae. It was originally described as Cossyphus reticulatus, and was for a long time placed in the genus Semicossyphus along with the California and goldspot sheephead wrasses, but a 2016 molecular phylogenetics study suggested that it (along with its two congeners) be moved to Bodianus (as Semicossyphus was found to be nested deep within Bodianus). This placement of Semicossyphus was supported by subsequent studies as well.

== Description ==
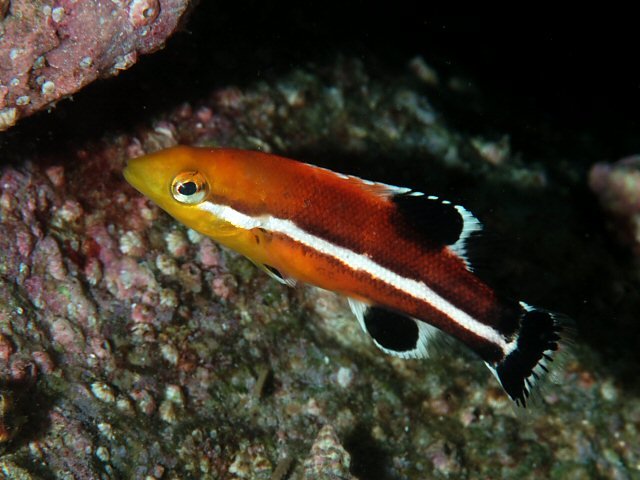
Young juvenile

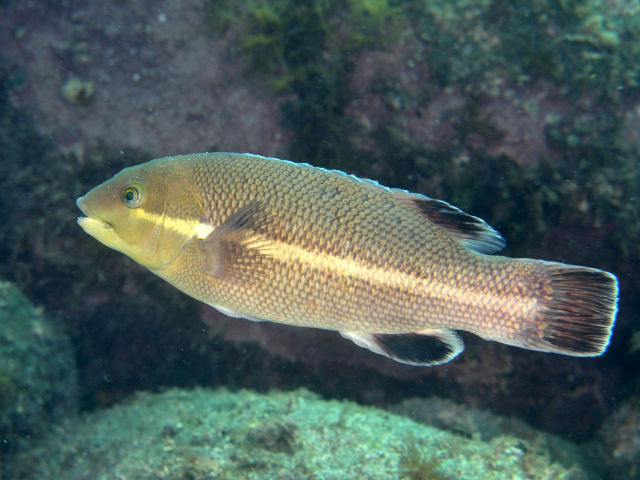
Older juvenile

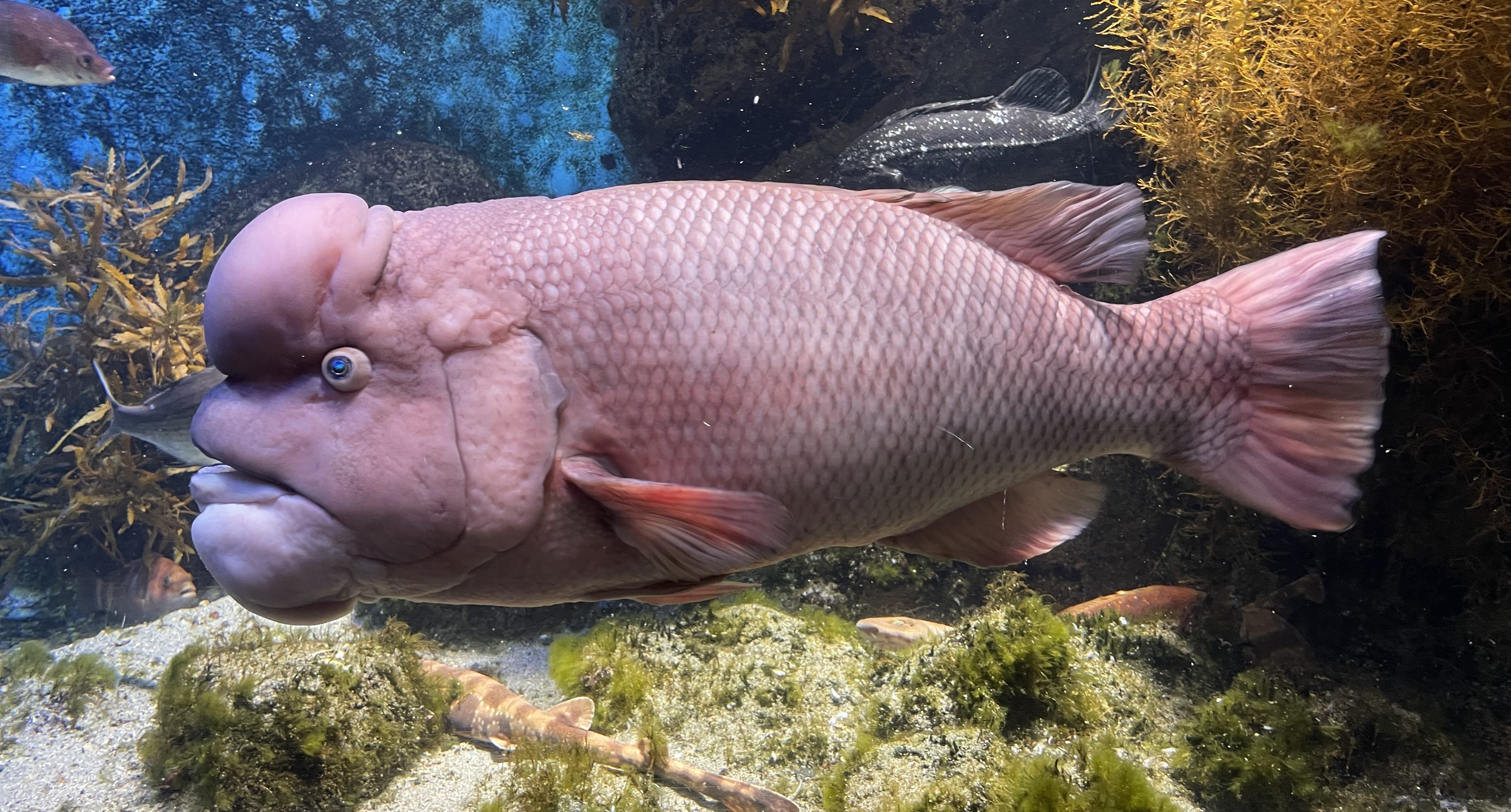
Adult male

The Asian sheephead wrasse is one of the largest wrasses found in the waters of the western Pacific, reaching a weight of around 14.7 kg (32 lb) and a length of 100 cm (39 in). The body is globiform and bulky, the caudal fin is truncate, and males are typically larger than females. The mouth is terminal, consistent with the fact that this fish is usually present in the middle of the water column, and prefer to eat prey directly in front of or beneath it. This fish has hard tooth-like structures present in the mouth, which are excellent for crushing crustaceans.

The fish is most known for the development of its bulbous forehead; however, this is prominent only in (adult) males, and juveniles lack this feature entirely. Juveniles have black areas on certain fins; these are eventually lost in adults, and give way to the dominating pink-gray color of adults. So, unlike many other wrasses, the Asian sheephead wrasse is not particularly colorful.

Like many other wrasses, the Asian sheephead wrasse is sequentially hermaphroditic. Specifically, they are protogynous, meaning that individuals of this species are always born female and only change sex when they grow older (although there is no definite age when this occurs) and reach a critical body size; the sex change does not always happen, and reversion is impossible. After the transition, the fish gains a bulbous forehead.

== Biology ==
=== Reproduction ===
As mentioned above, adult females of this species are able to change into males when they reach a critical body size; after the transition, the fish gains a bulbous forehead, and also starts exhibiting aggressive behavior. Post-transition males possess some left-over characteristics of females, including some ovariform gonads.

Males and females reproduce by practicing spawning, which usually occurs in warmer waters; prior to mating, males and females engage in courtship. It has been observed that one large male tends to mate with multiple smaller females at the same time, indicating a polygynous mating system.

=== Age and growth ===
This fish is able to live up to 40 to 50 years. At age zero, the fry is around 1 cm (0.39 in) in length, growing to about 40 cm (16 in) at the age of 15. Mature males are around 40–60 cm (16–24 in) and can spend the remaining portion of their lives at that size.

=== Diet ===
The Asian sheephead wrasse mostly consumes marine invertebrates such as mollusks, crabs, and sea urchins, but also takes vertebrates like small fish. In eating sea urchins, the Asian sheephead wrasse plays an important role in their population control, and thus is crucial in maintaining healthy marine habitats.

== Human interactions ==
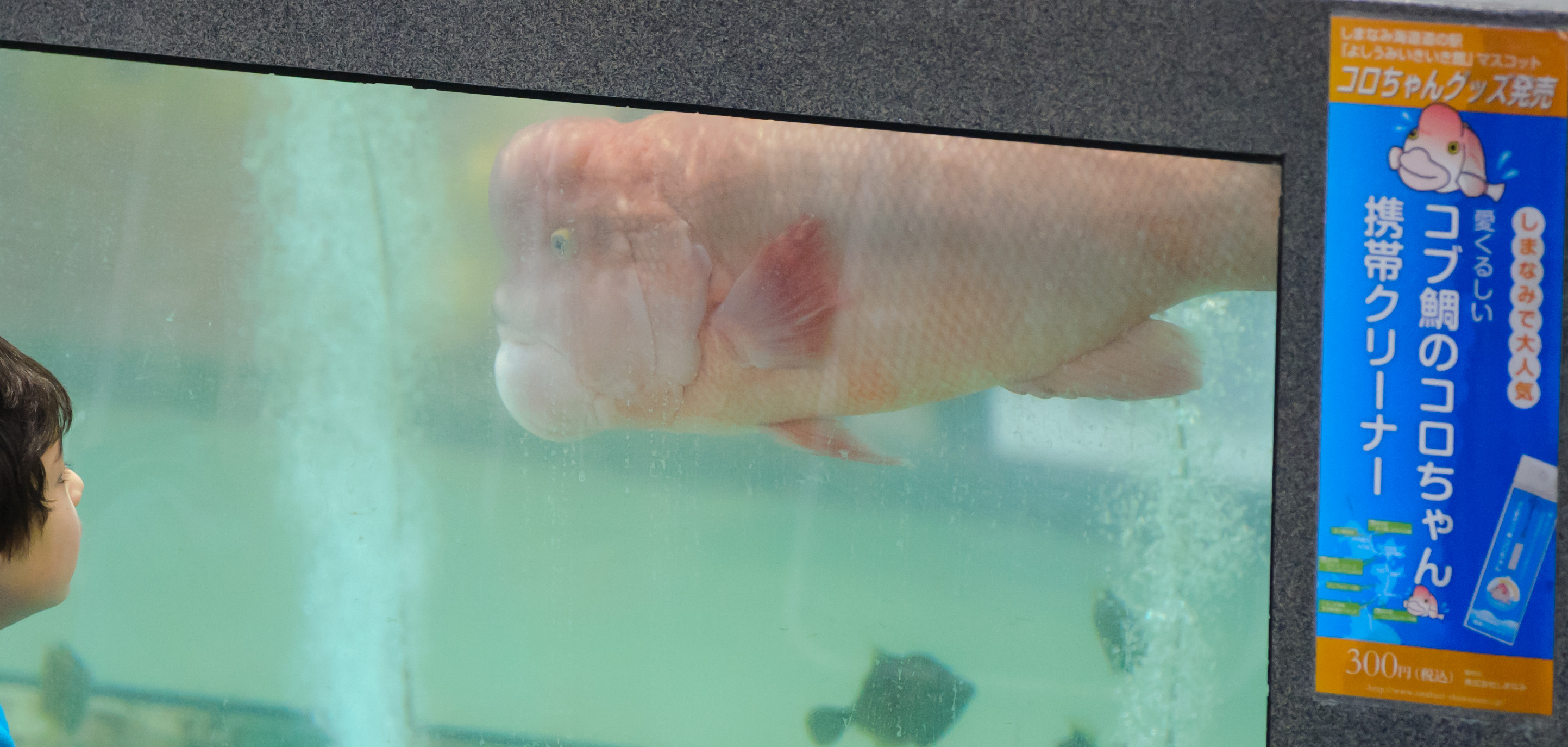
Asian sheephead wrasse in captivity, giving indication of size

The sheephead wrasse gained media attention when the sex change was caught on camera by the BBC Earth crew while filming in the waters near Sado Island, Japan. In 2017, it was shown on the Blue Planet II episode "One Ocean".

According to Great Big Story, Japanese diver Hiroyuki Arakawa had a 30-year relationship with an Asian sheephead wrasse, which he named "Yuriko", in Japan's Tateyama Bay, where he was the caretaker for an underwater Shinto shrine. He would call Yuriko by hitting a bell on the underwater shrine.

In Japan, this species is considered edible, and it is valued for its sweet, shellfish-like taste.

== Conservation status ==
The Asian sheephead wrasse is vulnerable to anthropogenic impacts and has suffered declines; direct ones include overfishing (and unsustainable fishing practices such as bottom trawling), pollution and habitat loss and degradation, but there are many other indirect anthropogenic factors. Despite this, the IUCN lists this fish as Data Deficient, which means that it views the proper conservation status of this species to be undetermined due to a lack of data.

== Gallery ==
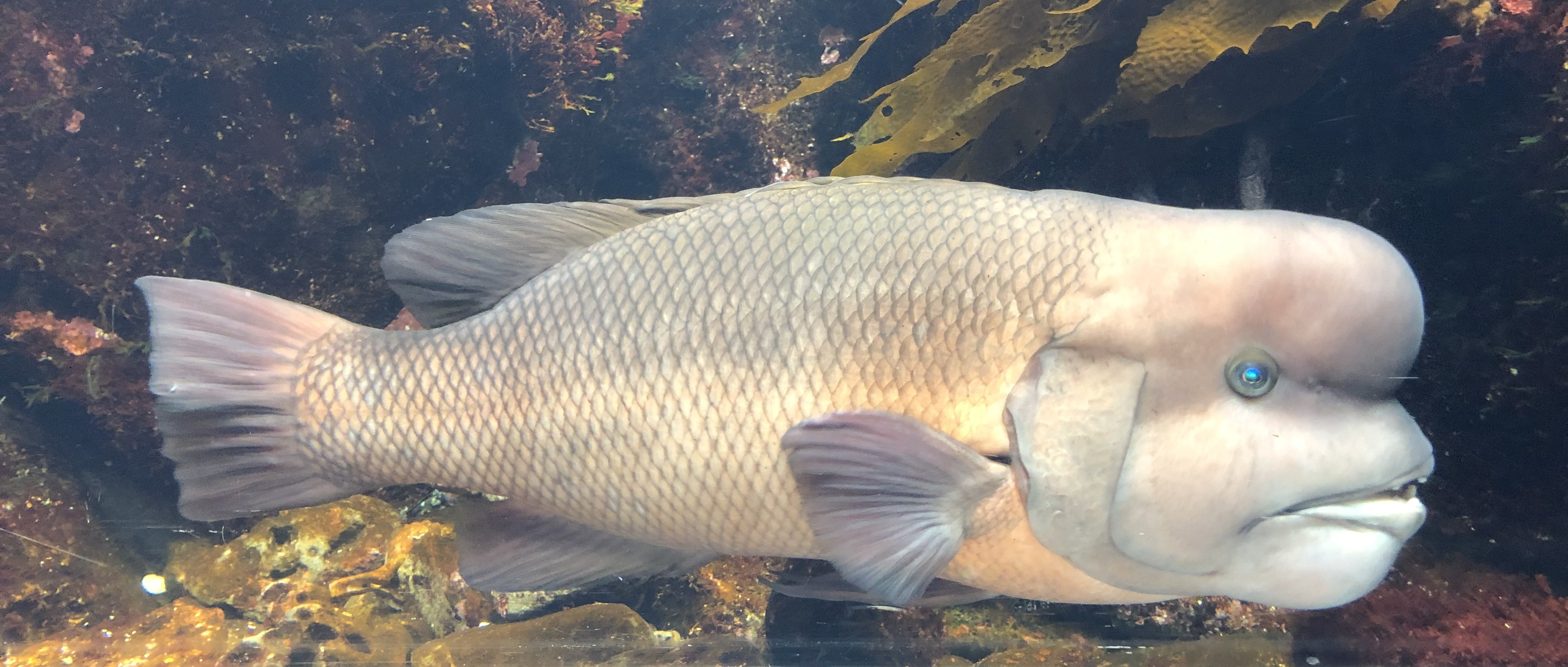

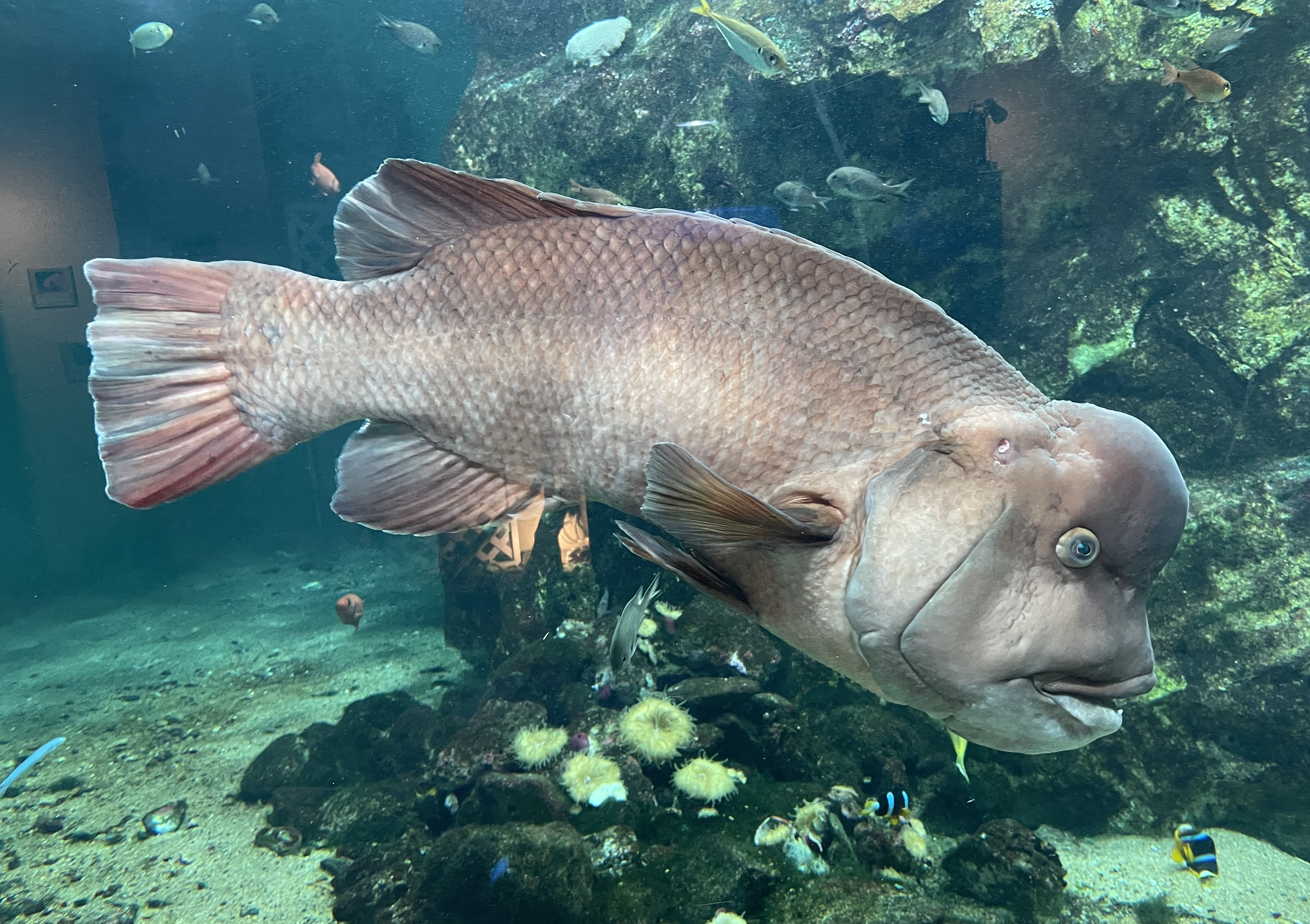

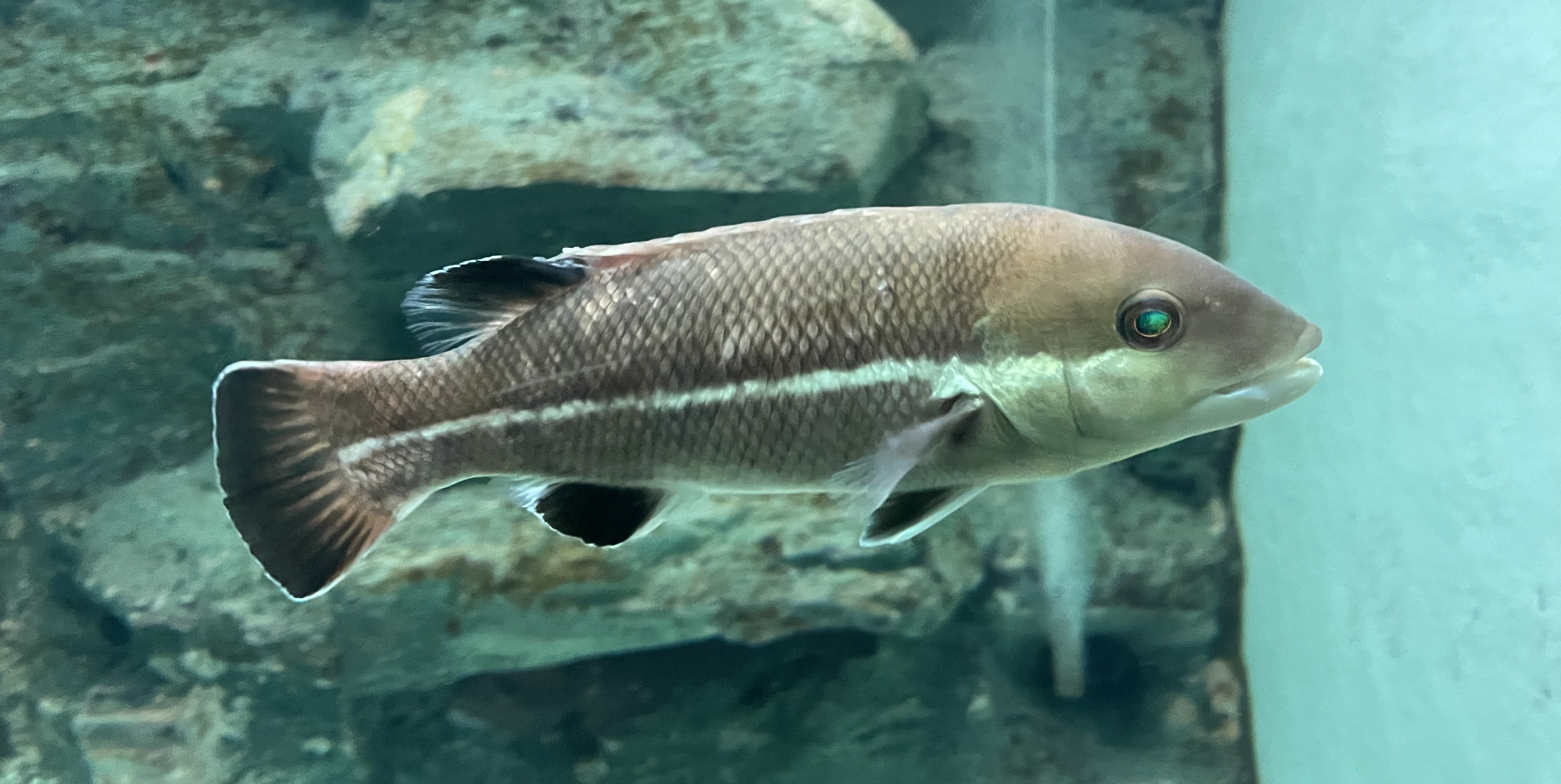
Juvenile

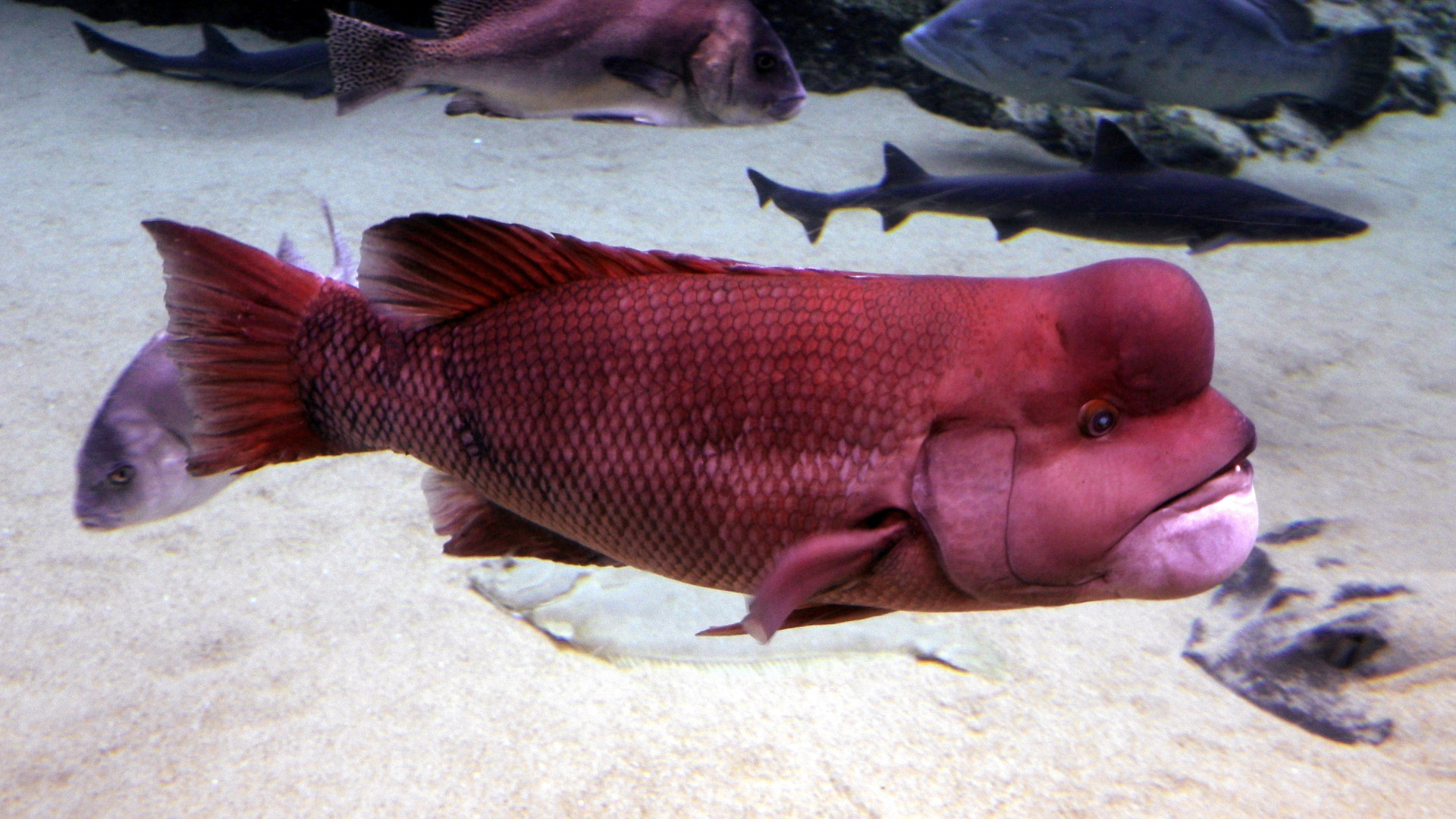

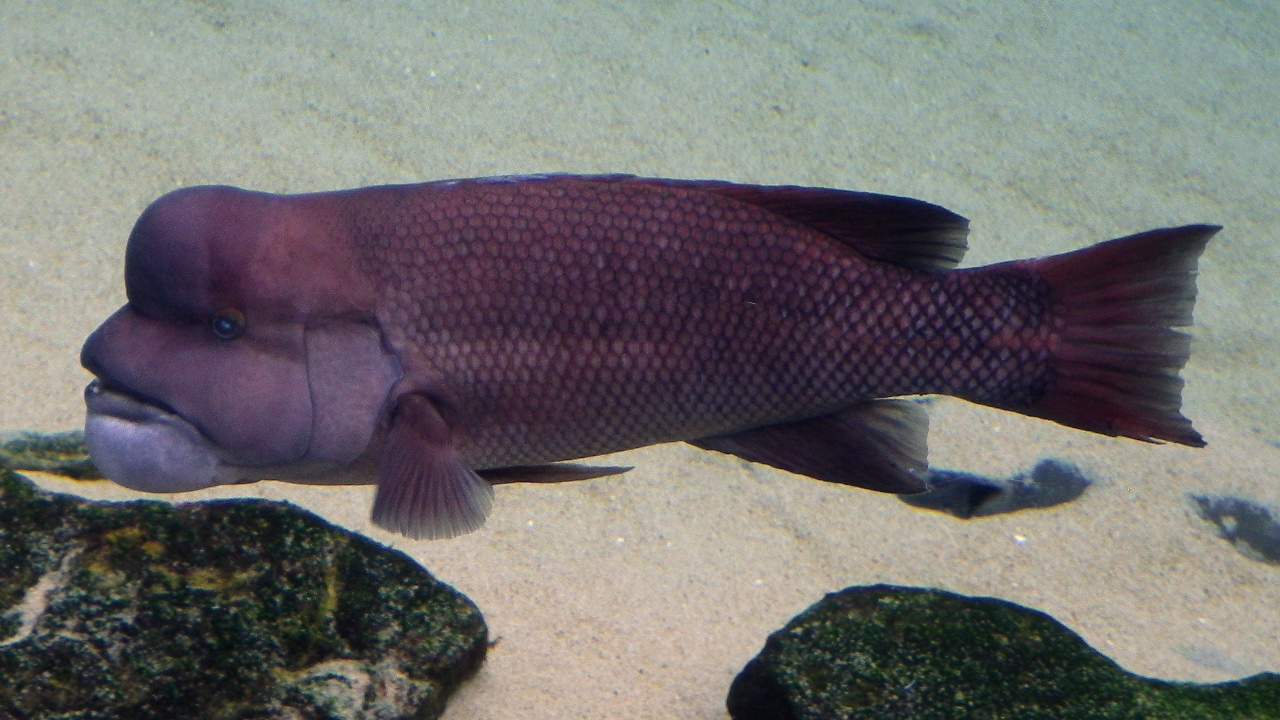

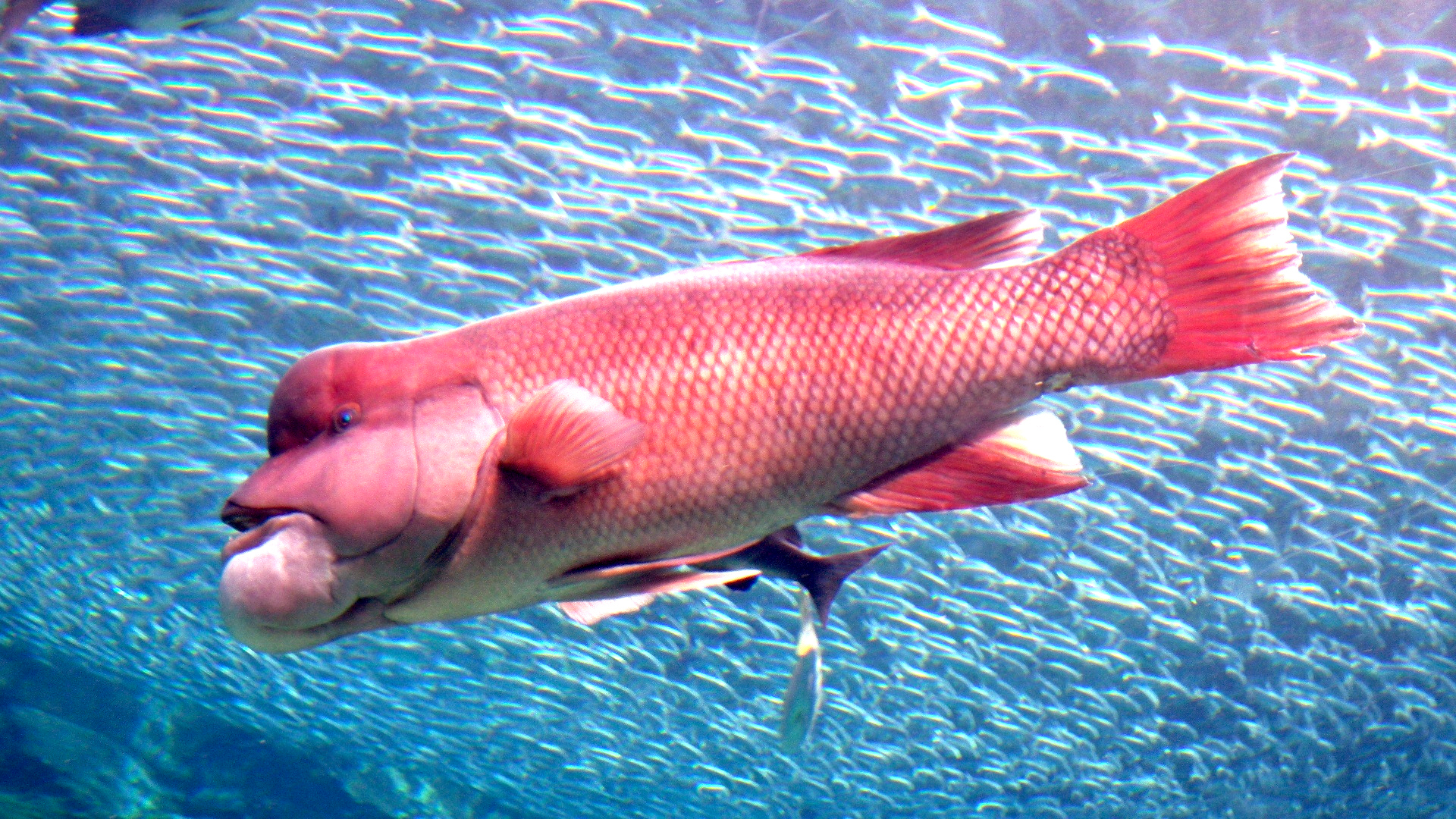

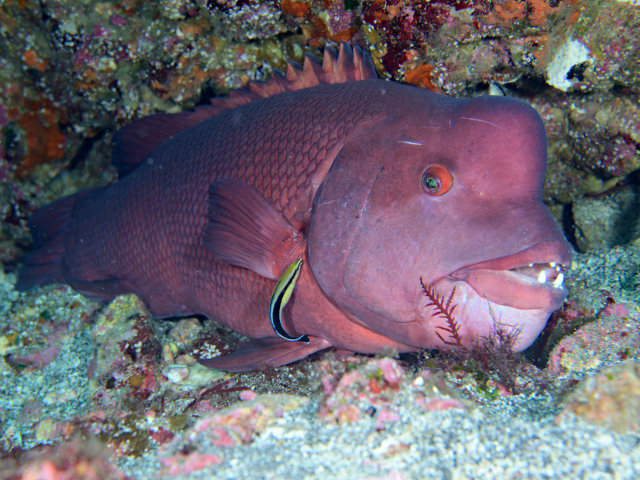
Attended by a bluestreak cleaner wrasse
