= Robert W. Sweet =

American judge

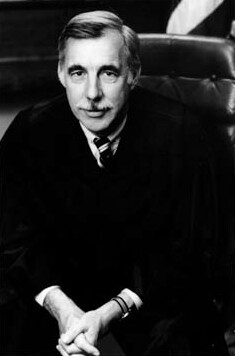

Senior Judge of the United States District Court for the Southern District of New York
- In office March 1, 1991 – March 24, 2019

Judge of the United States District Court for the Southern District of New York
- In office April 28, 1978 – March 1, 1991
- Appointed by: Jimmy Carter
- Preceded by: Inzer Bass Wyatt
- Succeeded by: Harold Baer Jr.

Personal details
- Born: Robert Workman Sweet; October 15, 1922 Yonkers, New York, U.S.
- Died: March 24, 2019 (aged 96) Ketchum, Idaho, U.S.
- Education: Yale University (BA, LLB)

Robert Workman Sweet (October 15, 1922 – March 24, 2019) was an American jurist and United States district judge of the United States District Court for the Southern District of New York.

== Early life and education ==
Sweet was born on October 15, 1922, in Yonkers, New York, the son of Delia (Workman) and James Sweet, a lawyer. He was in the United States Navy as a Lieutenant (j.g.) from 1943 to 1946. Sweet received a Bachelor of Arts degree in 1944 from Yale University and obtained a Bachelor of Laws from Yale Law School in 1948.

== Career ==
Sweet operated a private practice from 1948 to 1955 in New York City. From 1953 to 1955, he served as an Assistant United States Attorney of the Southern District of New York. He was Counsel for the New York State Interdepartmental Task Force on Youth and Juvenile Delinquency in 1958. He was the executive assistant to the mayor of New York City in 1966, then subsequently served as the deputy mayor of New York City from 1966 to 1969. He then was in private practice with the global New York law firm of Skadden, Arps, Slate, Meagher & Flom from 1970 to 1978.

Additionally, Sweet served as a consultant for the Association for a Better New York in New York City from 1970 to 1975, and a hearing officer for the New York City Transit Authority in Brooklyn, New York from 1975 to 1977.

=== Personal ===
Sweet was married to Adele Hall Sweet, daughter of publisher Dorothy Schiff, who died at the age of 93 on December 21, 2018. He died on March 24, 2019, aged 96.

== Federal judicial service ==
Sweet was nominated by President Jimmy Carter on February 17, 1978, to a seat on the United States District Court for the Southern District of New York vacated by Judge Inzer Bass Wyatt. He was confirmed by the United States Senate on April 25, 1978, and received his commission on April 28, 1978. He assumed senior status on March 1, 1991. One of Sweet's law clerks was Eliot Spitzer, who later became Governor of New York.

== Notable cases ==
=== Universal City Studios, Inc. v. Nintendo Co., Ltd. ===
In 1982, Sweet ruled against Universal Studios, which sued Nintendo for alleged copyrightability between the character King Kong and the 1981 Nintendo video game Donkey Kong. He stated that Universal didn't own the King Kong character since it was considered public domain (as ruled in the 1976 case Universal City Studios, Inc. v. RKO General, Inc.), and knowingly brought the case in attempt to extract license agreements from companies incapable of or unwilling to confront Universal's "profit center." Universal appealed the case in 1984, but the United States Court of Appeals for the Second Circuit sided with Sweet and reaffirmed his verdict. In 1985, Sweet ordered Universal to pay Nintendo $1.8 million for "legal fees, photocopying expenses, costs incurred creating graphs and charts, and lost revenues."

=== Consumers' lawsuit against McDonald's ===
One controversial case he decided was Pelman v. McDonald's Corporation, a case involving a group of teenagers who sued McDonald's fast-food chain, claiming the food sold by McDonald's caused their obesity. Sweet dismissed the case in 2003 and said "it is not the place of the law to protect them against their own excesses". However, the plaintiffs appealed to United States Court of Appeals for the Second Circuit, and in 2005 the circuit court vacated the district court's dismissal and reinstated some of the claims as incorrectly dismissed. (Ultimately, the lawsuit failed when it was denied class-action status in 2010.)

=== New York Times and Judith Miller controversy ===
In 2005, in New York Times v. Gonzales, Sweet decided that The New York Times can maintain the confidentiality of its sources, refusing to dismiss Times' suit against Department of Justice in the Judith Miller controversy. However, later the Second Circuit reversed his decision and allowed Special Prosecutor Patrick Fitzgerald to access phone records of New York Times journalists.

=== Opposition to war on drugs ===
Sweet expressed strong opposition to the United States' war on drugs, saying the drug war is "expensive, ineffective and harmful" and that only "gangs and cartels benefit from current drug laws". In an interview with PBS, he said that the mandatory minimum sentence for drug offences violates due process and separation of powers. Sweet did not believe some drugs should be legalized while others remain illegal. He said, "'To draw distinctions on the degree of addiction may not be empirically possible, nor does it appeal to logic and symmetry. In my view, you don't outlaw 120 proof while permitting 80.'' With co-author Edward A. Harris he contributed a chapter to Jefferson Fish's book How to Legalize Drugs. Sweet was a member of Law Enforcement Against Prohibition, and served on its advisory board. Sweet also served on the honorary board of the Drug Policy Alliance.

=== Gene patents ===
On March 29, 2010, in Association for Molecular Pathology, et al. v. United States Patent and Trademark Office, et al., Sweet ruled that Myriad Genetics' patent on BRCA1 and BRCA2, genes linked to breast cancer, were invalid for the reason that, in Sweet's opinion, genes do not constitute patentable subject matter. His decision was 156 pages long.

=== Giuffre v. Maxwell ===
In 2017 – at the age of 94 – Judge Sweet presided over the lawsuit by Virginia Giuffre against Ghislaine Maxwell. His decisions to keep records under seal, despite motions by the Miami Herald, Alan Dershowitz, and Mike Cernovich to unseal various portions of the record, which related to claims regarding Jeffrey Epstein, was overturned by the Second Circuit Court of Appeals.

In his order on Maxwell's Motion to Dismiss under Federal Rule of Civil Procedure 12(b)(6), Judge Sweet refuted Defendant's argument that libel per se doctrine did not apply to Giuffre in her capacity as a non-profit professional. Judge Sweet noted in dicta that, not only is non-profit administration indeed a valid profession, judicially noticeable press articles refuted Defendant's argument that denial of an individual's claim to be a victim of human trafficking does not harm them in their professional capacity as an advocate for victims of trafficking.

Legal offices
Preceded by Inzer Bass Wyatt	Judge of the United States District Court for the Southern District of New York; 1978–1991	Succeeded by Harold Baer Jr.
