= Inzer Bass Wyatt =

American judge

Senior Judge of the United States District Court for the Southern District of New York
- In office March 29, 1977 – January 17, 1990

Judge of the United States District Court for the Southern District of New York
- In office September 28, 1962 – March 29, 1977
- Appointed by: John F. Kennedy
- Preceded by: Seat established by 75 Stat. 80
- Succeeded by: Robert W. Sweet

Personal details
- Born: Inzer Bass Wyatt; March 29, 1907 Huntsville, Alabama, U.S.
- Died: January 17, 1990 (aged 82) New York City, New York, U.S.
- Education: University of Alabama (BA); Harvard University (LLB)

Inzer Bass Wyatt (March 29, 1907 – January 17, 1990) was a United States district judge of the United States District Court for the Southern District of New York.

== Education and career ==
Born in Huntsville, Alabama, Wyatt received an Artium Baccalaureus degree from the University of Alabama in 1927 and a Bachelor of Laws from Harvard Law School in 1930. He was in private practice in New York City, New York from 1930 to 1941. He served as a colonel in the United States Army during World War II from 1942 to 1945. He returned to private practice in New York City from 1946 to 1962.

== Federal judicial service ==
On July 5, 1962, Wyatt was nominated by President John F. Kennedy to a new seat on the United States District Court for the Southern District of New York created by 75 Stat. 80. He was confirmed by the United States Senate on September 20, 1962, and received his commission on September 28, 1962. He assumed senior status on March 29, 1977, serving in that capacity until his death on January 17, 1990, in New York City.

== Sources ==
Legal offices
Preceded by Seat established by 75 Stat. 80	Judge of the United States District Court for the Southern District of New York; 1962–1977	Succeeded by Robert W. Sweet
