= Supersize =

Food portion descriptor

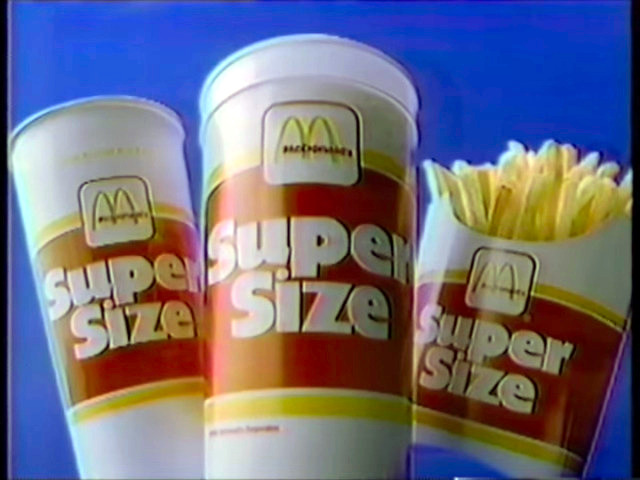
McDonald's "Super Size" products

Supersize food portions are portions that are larger than the normal "large" size. The term was particularly used by McDonald's restaurants for their largest-size portions of French fries and soft drinks. In the United States, McDonald's introduced the supersized option in the summer of 1987.

For Disney's 1988 film Who Framed Roger Rabbit, instead of running a Happy Meal promotion targeted at children, they opted for a "super-size" promotion, "designed to appeal to teenagers and young adults, the same as the movie's audience". The same held true for the 1993 Steven Spielberg film Jurassic Park, when McDonald's introduced their Dino-Sized drink and fry options.

In 2004, Morgan Spurlock released a documentary film called Super Size Me, in which Spurlock ate only McDonald's food for 30 days while exploring the effects on his health. In March 2004, six weeks after the film's debut, McDonald's announced a plan to phase out the Supersize option, citing needs to simplify the menu and to offer healthier food choices.

== See also ==
- Upselling
