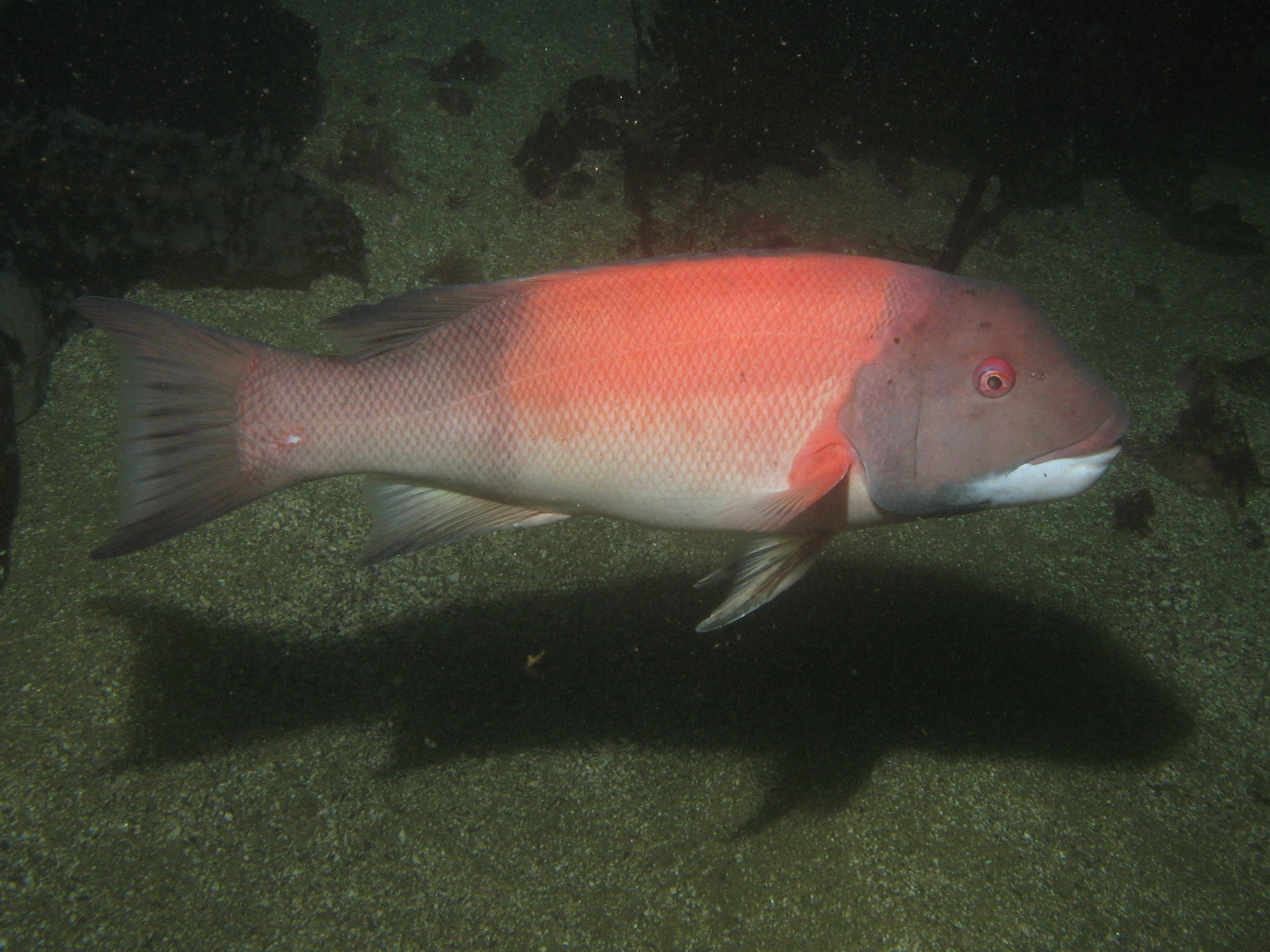
- Male

Conservation status
- Vulnerable (IUCN 3.1)

Scientific classification
- Kingdom: Animalia
- Phylum: Chordata
- Class: Actinopterygii
- Division: Teleostei
- Order: Labriformes
- Family: Labridae
- Genus: Bodianus
- Species: B. pulcher

Binomial name
- Bodianus pulcher (Ayres, 1854)

Synonyms
- Labrus pulcher Ayres, 1854; Pimelometopon pulcher (Ayres, 1854); Semicossyphus pulcher (Ayres, 1854)

= California sheephead =

Species of fish

The California sheephead (Bodianus pulcher, (formerly Semicossyphus pulcher) is a species of wrasse native to the eastern Pacific Ocean. Its range is from Monterey Bay, California, to the Gulf of California, Mexico. It can live for over 50 years and can reach a size of up to 91 cm (3 ft) and a weight of 16 kg (35 lb). It is carnivorous, living in rocky reef and kelp bed habitats, feeding primarily on sea urchins, molluscs, and crustaceans.

All California sheephead are hatched female and morph into their male form at various stages in their lifecycle, determined by environmental conditions and pressures. Because of this, they are considered to be protogynous hermaphrodites which have planktonic larvae. Their coral and kelp-heavy habitat provides protection from predators, which is important as this species is diurnal, foraging during the day and seeking shelter at night.

The California sheephead is considered vulnerable due to high fishing rates off the coast of southern California. Since fisheries tend to remove the largest fish, they end up removing the males. This skews the male-to-female ratio and affects the fishes' lifecycle, which can negatively affect populations.

== Etymology ==
Bodianus is New Latin. Pulcher is the Latin word for beautiful. In French, the fish is called the labre Californien (lit. 'Californian wrasse'), and in Spanish it is called the vieja de California (lit. 'Old woman of California').

== Taxonomy ==
The species is most closely related to the Asian and goldspot sheephead wrasse. The three species were previously considered to form their own genus Semicossyphus, but are now lumped into Bodianus, after molecular phylogenetics showed that Semicossyphus was nested deep within Bodianus.

== Description ==
Male and female California sheepheads have different color patterns and body shapes. Males are larger, with black tail and head sections, wide, reddish orange midriffs, red eyes, and fleshy forehead bumps. Female sheephead are silvery or dull pink with white undersides. Both sexes have white chins and large, protruding canine teeth that can pry hard-shelled animals from rocks or inflict nasty puncture wounds on skin divers. After powerful jaws and sharp teeth crush the prey, modified throat bones (a throat plate) grind the shells into small pieces. California sheephead can reach a size of 91 cm (3 ft) and a weight of 16 kg (35 lb). All sheepheads are born as females and eventually change to males at roughly 45 cm (1.5 ft). The age of the transition depends on environmental factors such as food supply. The species can live for over 50 years.

Growth series: from youngest to oldest

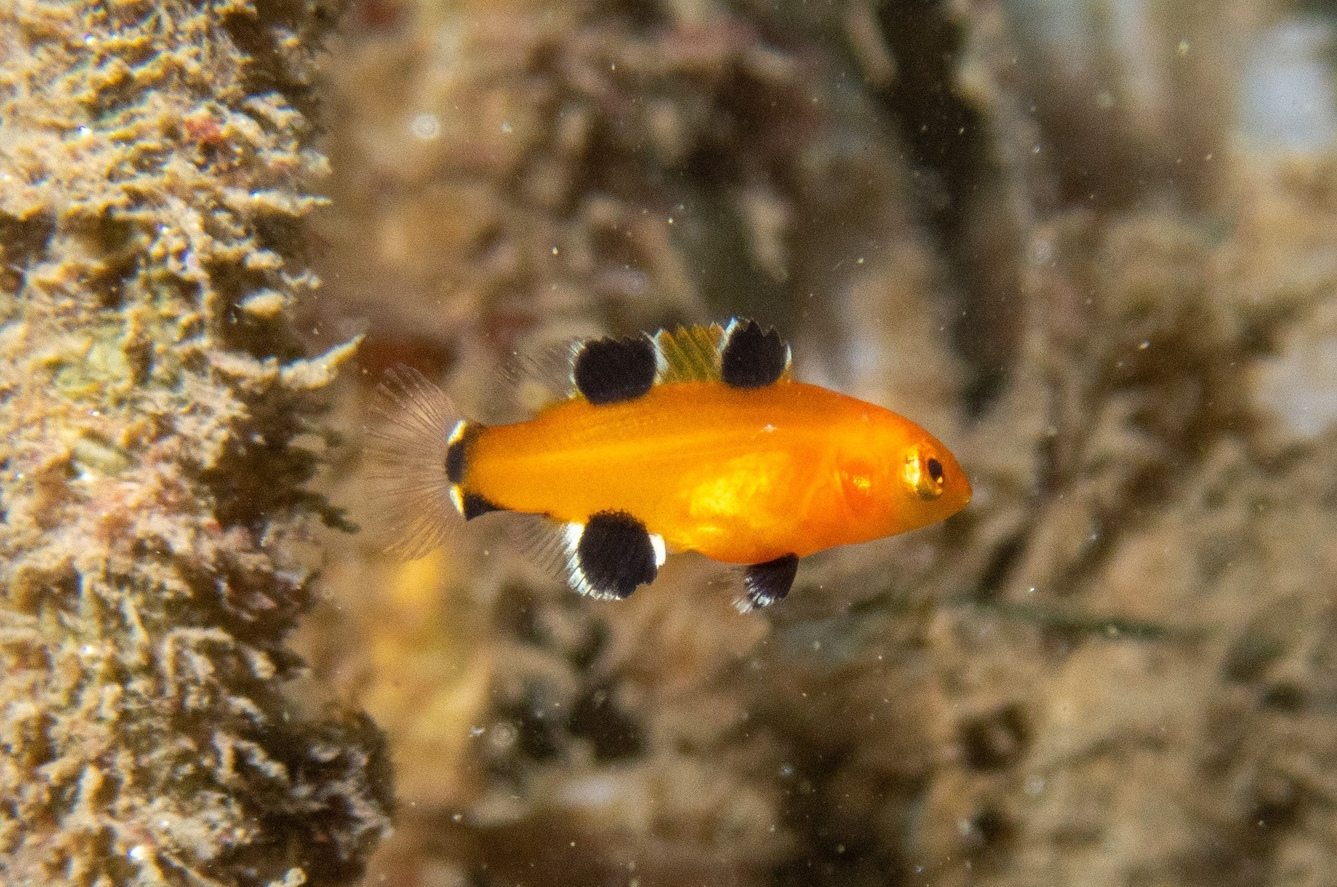
Juvenile

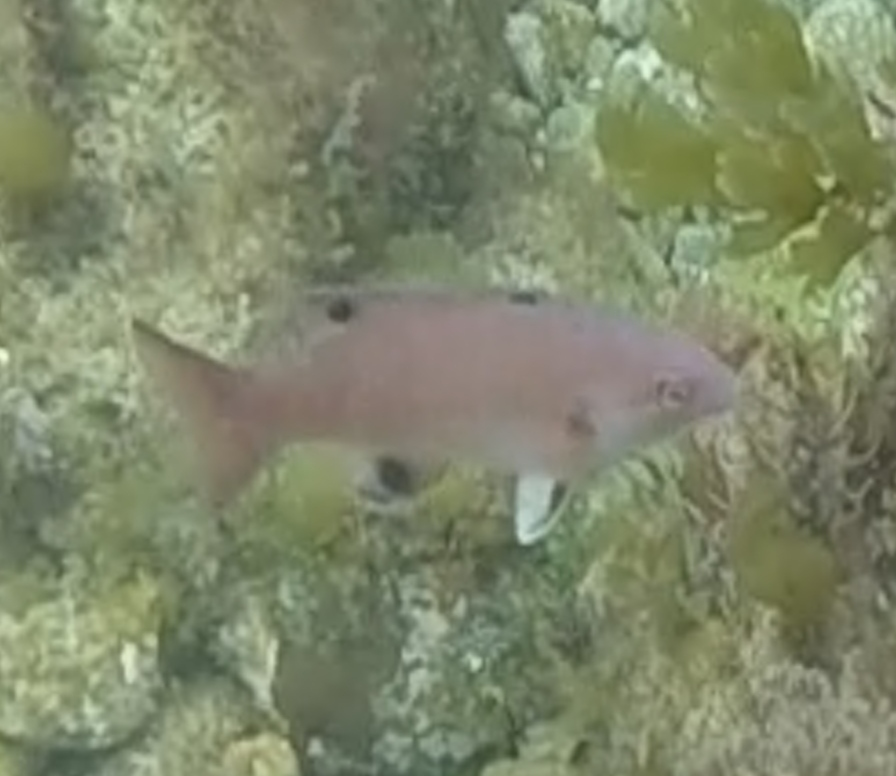
Juvenile

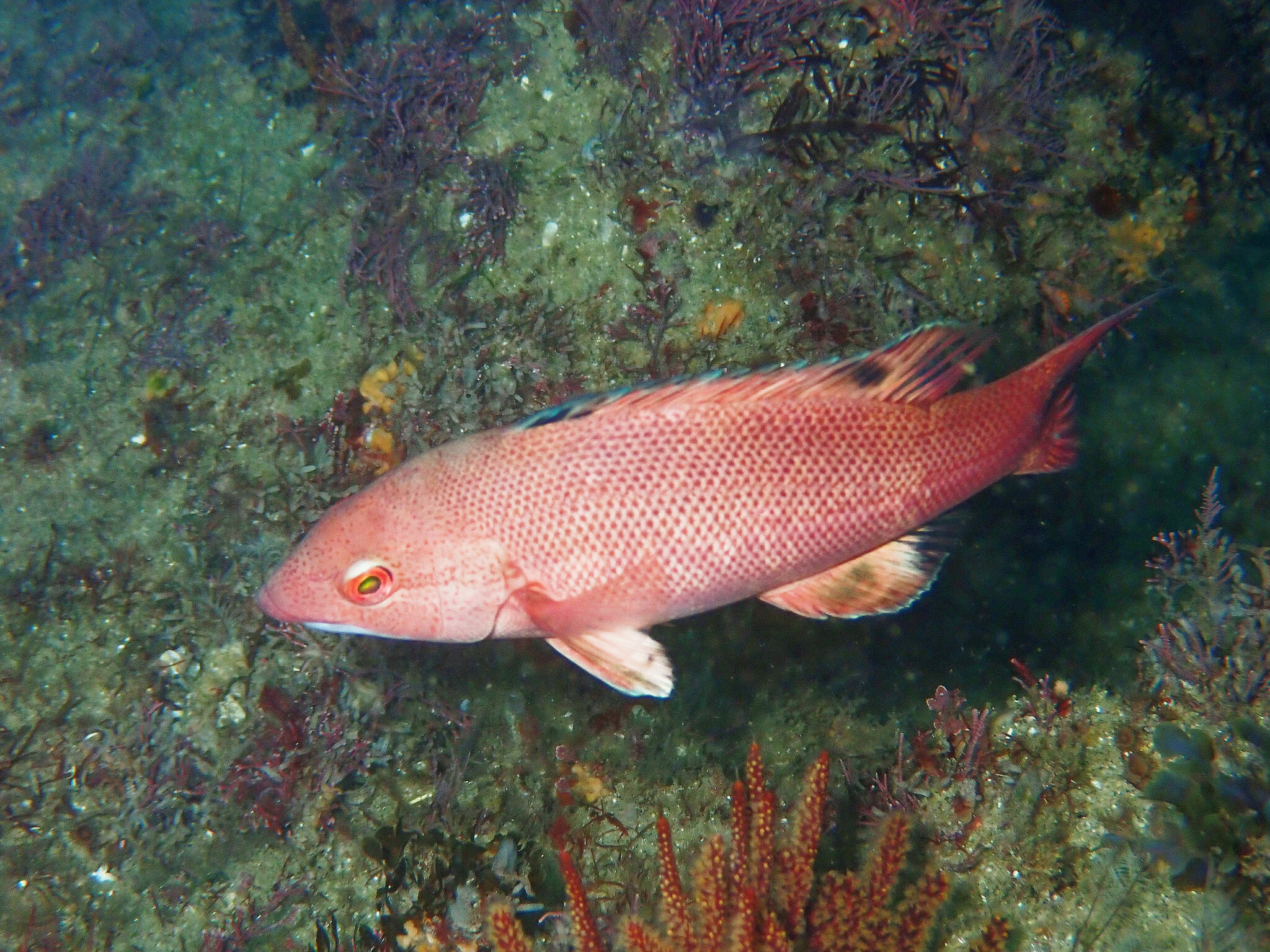
Juvenile

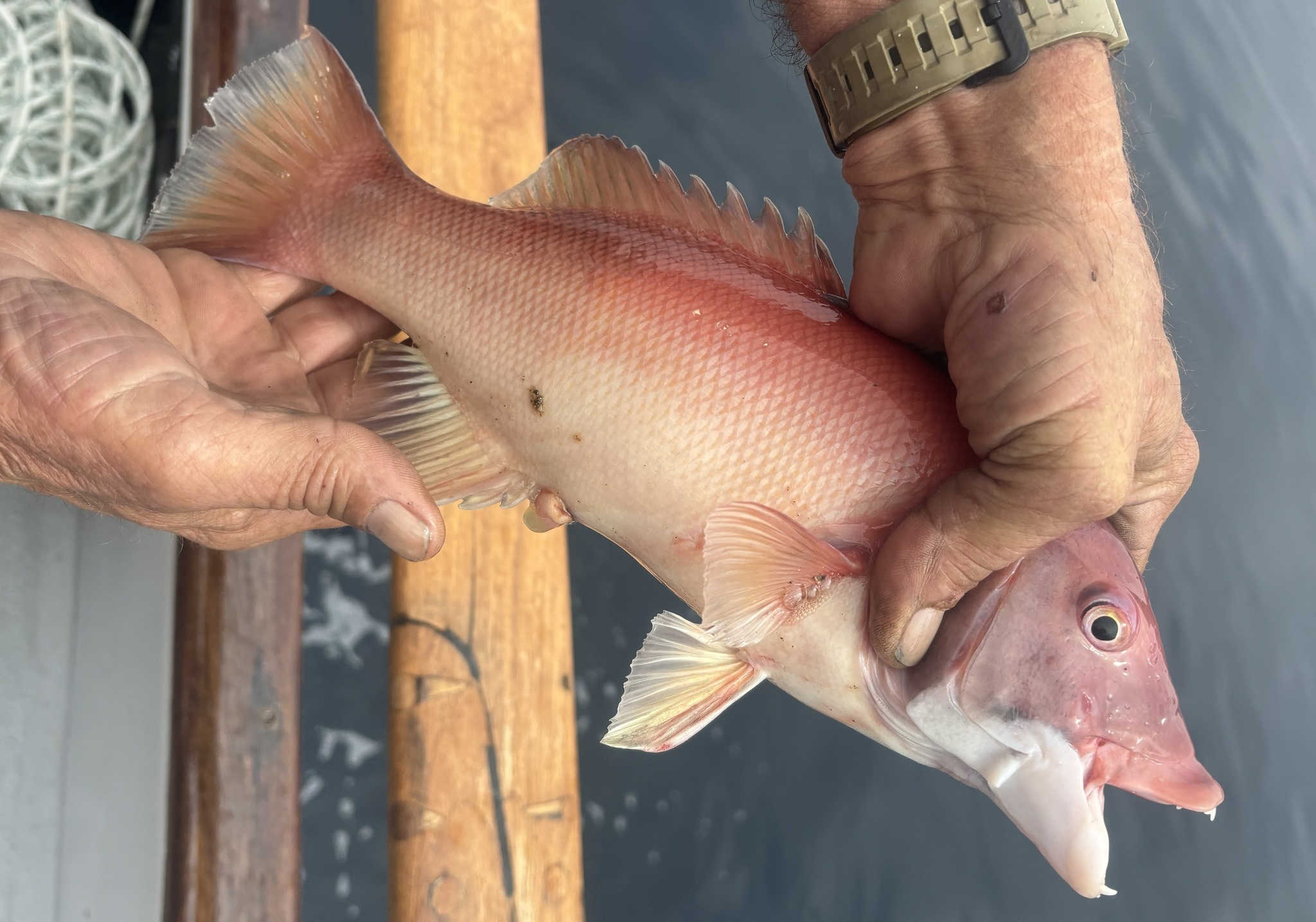
Adult female

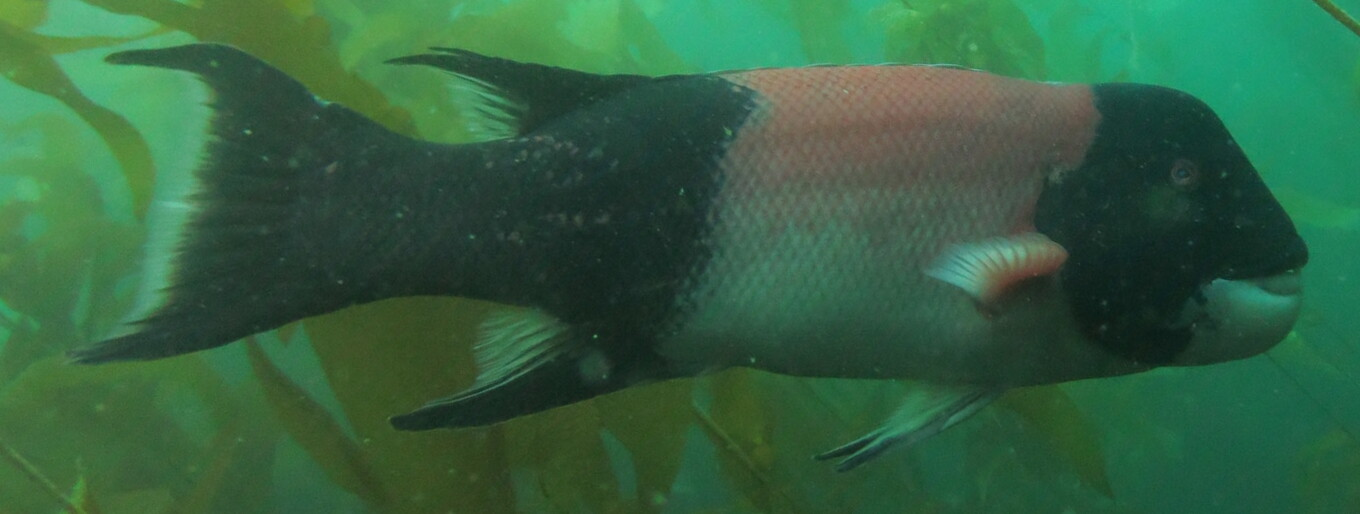
Adult male

== Biology ==
The California sheephead lives in kelp forests and rocky reefs, where it feeds on sea urchins, molluscs, lobsters, and crabs. Fertilized eggs are released into the water column and hatch, resulting in planktonic larva.

Like many wrasse species, sheephead are protogynous. All are born female, and the largest individuals become male due to hormonal changes triggered by social cues. The two sexes have extremely different appearances, so this transition is among the most dramatic among the wrasses. Because only large individuals are male, setting minimum catch sizes has made populations mostly female, with a negative effect on population sizes.

== Distribution and habitat ==
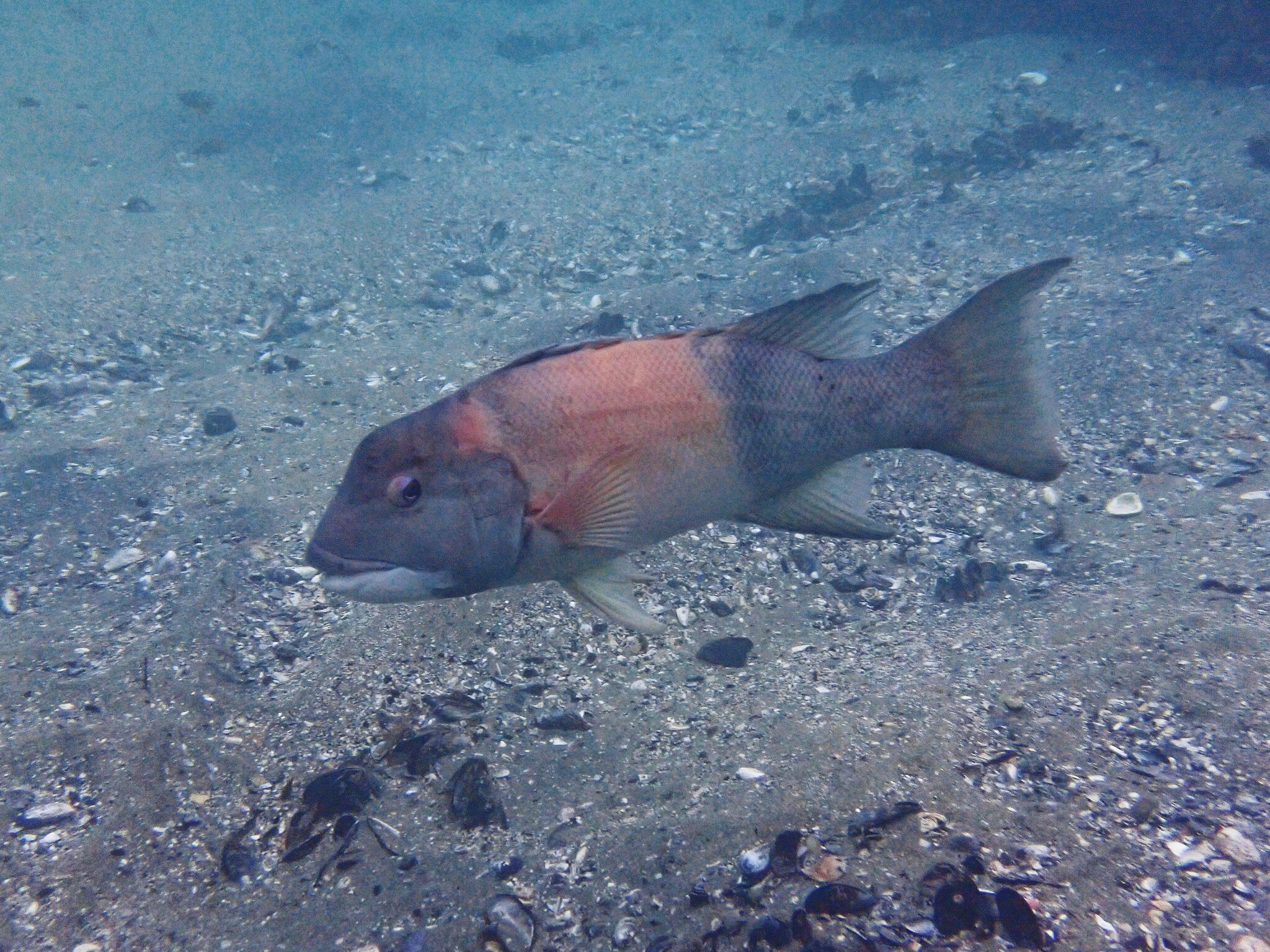
Male, in California

Home ranges in California sheephead vary greatly, and this variability can be attributed to differences in habitat shape (embayment versus contiguous coastline) and to natural habitat boundaries (deep, sandy expanses). It is found in rocky-reef areas 54% of the time, and within those areas, a greater percentage of daytime is found in high relief areas. Although their home ranges are thought of as particularly well defined, the size and fidelity may vary ontogenetically and seasonally and with habitat availability. Sheephead home ranges are relatively small, and the fish have a very high site attachment. They may select rocky areas with kelp most often due to the increased habitat complexity, which likely offers additional feeding opportunities and potential refuge from large predators. Sheephead generally are considered mainly a rocky-reef and kelp-bed associated species, but they occasionally frequent sand habitats in foraging forays.

== Ecology ==
The California sheephead is a monandric protogynous hermaphrodite and is a commercially and recreationally valuable labrid. It is a prominent species occupying the southern California rocky reef and kelp bed fish assemblage. Both the ecology and life history patterns of California sheephead have been shown to vary with local environmental conditions.

=== Feeding ===
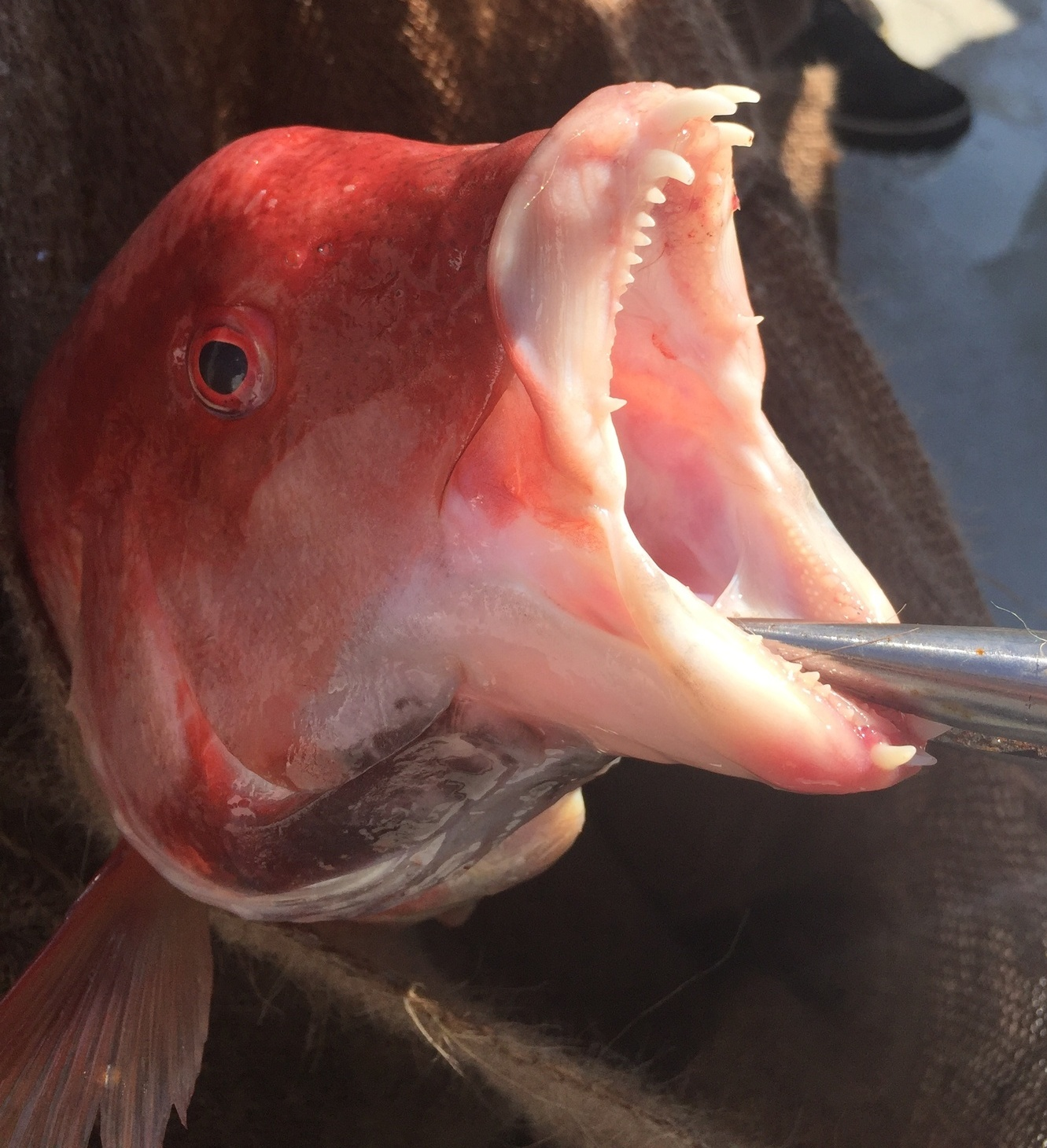
Female, showing teeth

The California sheephead is a carnivorous, epibenthic reef fish, foraging mostly in the daytime in sand-rock reef habitats. Its feeding territories are very productive and allow individuals to occupy small, permanent, economically defendable home ranges. As a large temperate wrasse, it is a predator of sea urchins and other benthic invertebrates and play a critical role in also regulating prey populations in kelp forests. Since it feeds heavily on urchins, it is consequently an important species for indirectly regulating kelp growth in southern California's coastal waters. However, it exhibits flexibility in prey selection if its main food source is not readily available at a particular time. Populations with diets dominated by crabs and sea urchins, however, reach larger sizes and mature and change sex at larger sizes than populations that consume higher proportions of bivalves, barnacles, and bryozoans. Since they forage in the daytime and are considered a diurnal species, they may rely on anatomical characteristics which allow them to feed in exposed locations in broad daylight while overcoming the defenses evolved by their prey. They forage both in groups and alone, and larger fish tend to shift towards more heavily armored prey.

=== Predation ===
As a reef fish, signals about the sheephead's predation risk often comes from the presence of damage-released chemical cues produced by injured prey animals. These clues are only released when the skin is ruptured, and act as a reliable indicator of the presence of an actively foraging predator. Chemical cues may be released not only with injury, but also when pathogens or parasites penetrate the skin; therefore, the reliability of the chemical cues as indicators of predation risk is decreased. When a sheephead is captured by a predator, and damage-released chemical cues are discharged, the information is available for both conspecifics and heterospecifics to use.

=== Migration and territoriality ===
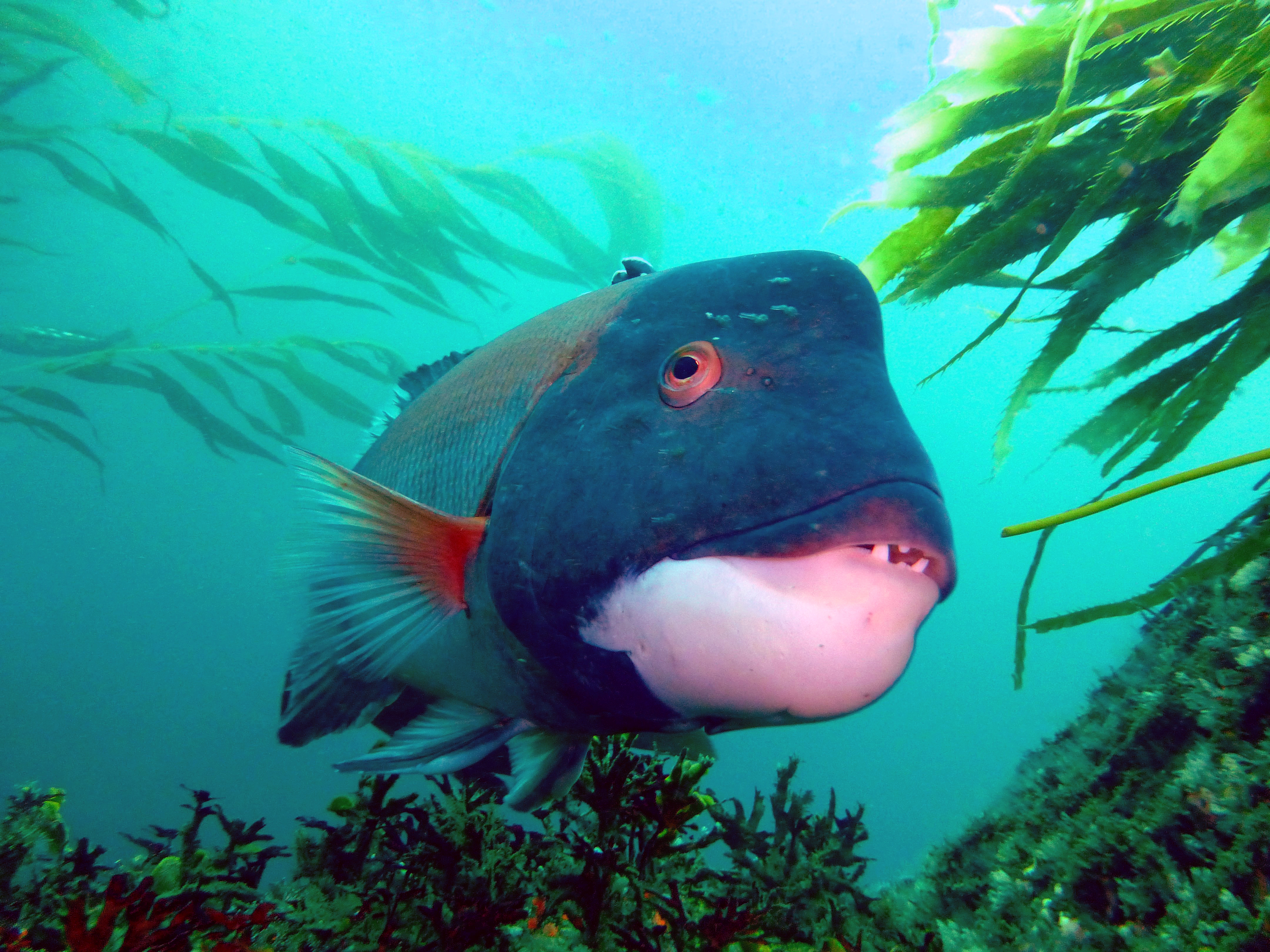
Male in a kelp bed habitat

The behavior of California sheephead is shaped by the daily cycle of light, twilight, and dark. Diurnal fishes, like the sheephead, make a round trip between their refuges and foraging areas twice a day, and additional daily trips may be made by breeding fishes to spawning sites. This elaborate diel timing of movements is driven by the need to forage or mate while minimizing predation. Patterns in the movement of California sheephead are mediated by fish sex and size; for example, large males will exhibit higher site fidelity than females. However, males also show wider ambits than females, and the size of their ambits changes seasonally. During spawning season, males show a daily increase in their ambits during a period of potential spawning, and also make daily journeys offshore into deeper water. Females (which would be expected to move more frequently among male territories) do not expand their ambits significantly during this same period. Each of the movements offshore by males is followed by a return to nearshore habitat prior to twilight, suggesting the occupation of a spawning territory at that time. At twilight, continuing to about 10 to 15 minutes after sunset, the degree of activity above the reef rapidly decreases and sheephead seek shelter for the night; this 'quiet' period is a time of major activity for larger reef predators.

Male and female California sheephead have overlapping home ranges; although they are not usually considered a territorial species, male sheephead can exhibit territorial behavior. Male sheephead are increasingly territorial throughout the day during periods of spawning activity. Since spawning activity occurs around sunset, it may be that they only have differences in space use for short periods on various days during the spawning season, thus male territoriality only occurs in this same timespan.

=== Breeding and lifecycle ===
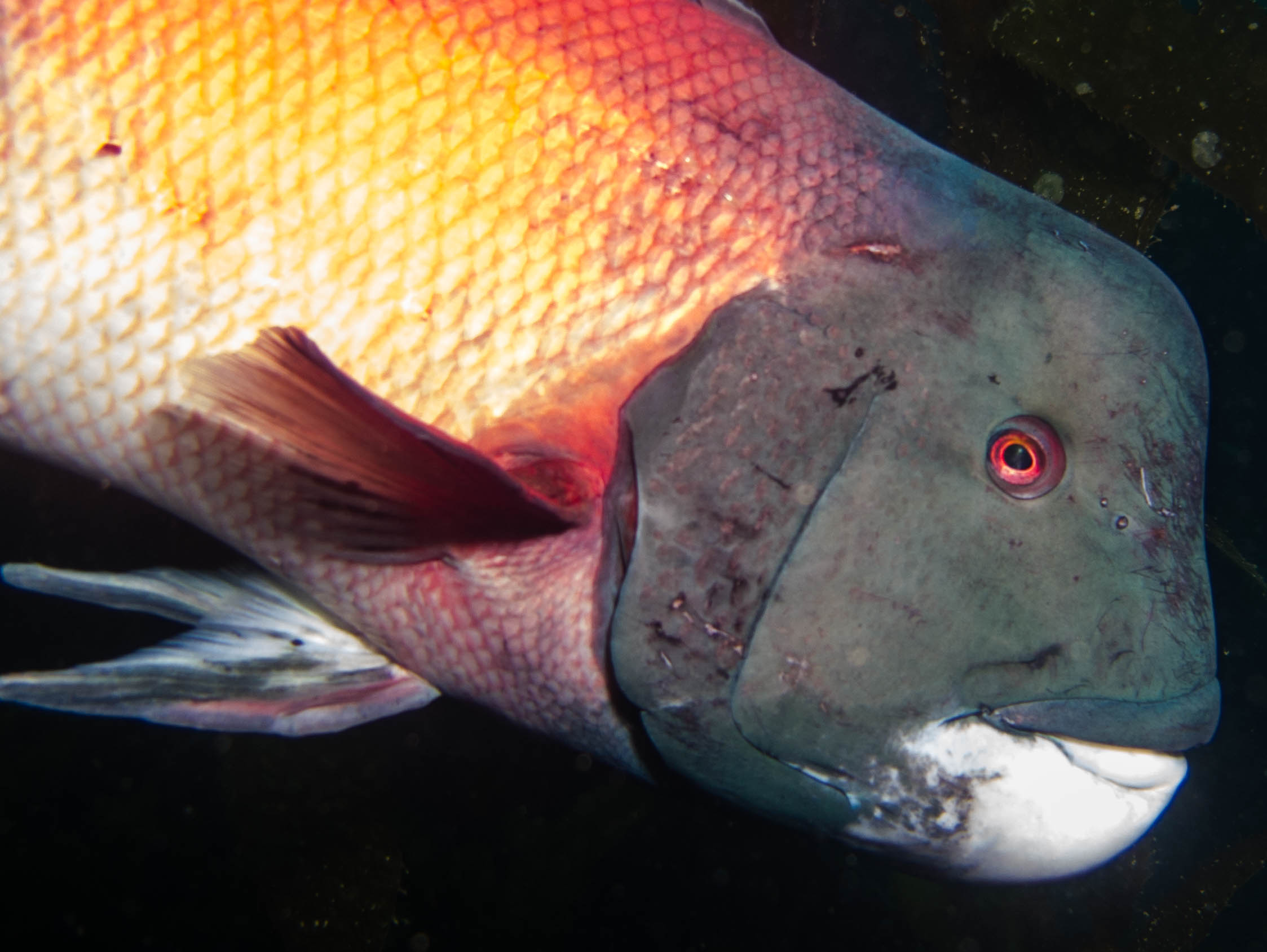
Males have large humps on the forehead.

California sheephead populations vary in their reproductive potential and reproductive capacity, and these differences are correlated with the natural sea surface temperature gradient. Fish in cooler waters may require less energy for growth and may be able to convert more energy into reproduction than fish at warmer sites. Population densities and sex ratios of hermaphroditic fishes are also intimately linked to ecological factors and human activities. Spatial and temporal changes in fishing pressure, coupled with environmental changes across populations over time, tend to affect the reproductive potential of each population of California sheephead. Spatially separate populations of California sheephead vary in their sex ratios (number of females to number of males), in size of individuals at sex change, and in the sex ratio threshold. Sheephead are also haremic spawners, meaning each male defends a group of females with which he breeds.

=== Sex change ===
California sheephead can transition from a reproductively functional female to a functional male during the course of a lifespan in response to social factors. Protogynous sex change typically follows the size-advantage model, where gonadal transformation occurs once the reproductive potential of an individual would be greater as a male than as a female. The transitional phase takes between two weeks and several months, and steroid hormone concentrations are thought to be related to sex change due to the total degradation of the ovaries and the appearance of testes. The exact timing of the sexual morphogenesis is suppressed by aggressive interactions with dominant males and triggered by the removal of alpha males. There is a period of reproductive inactivity during gonadal remodeling, and the sex change in this species is unidirectional. In later stages of the transition, fish possibly are functionally male, but maintain an intersexual gonadal appearance.

== Human interaction ==
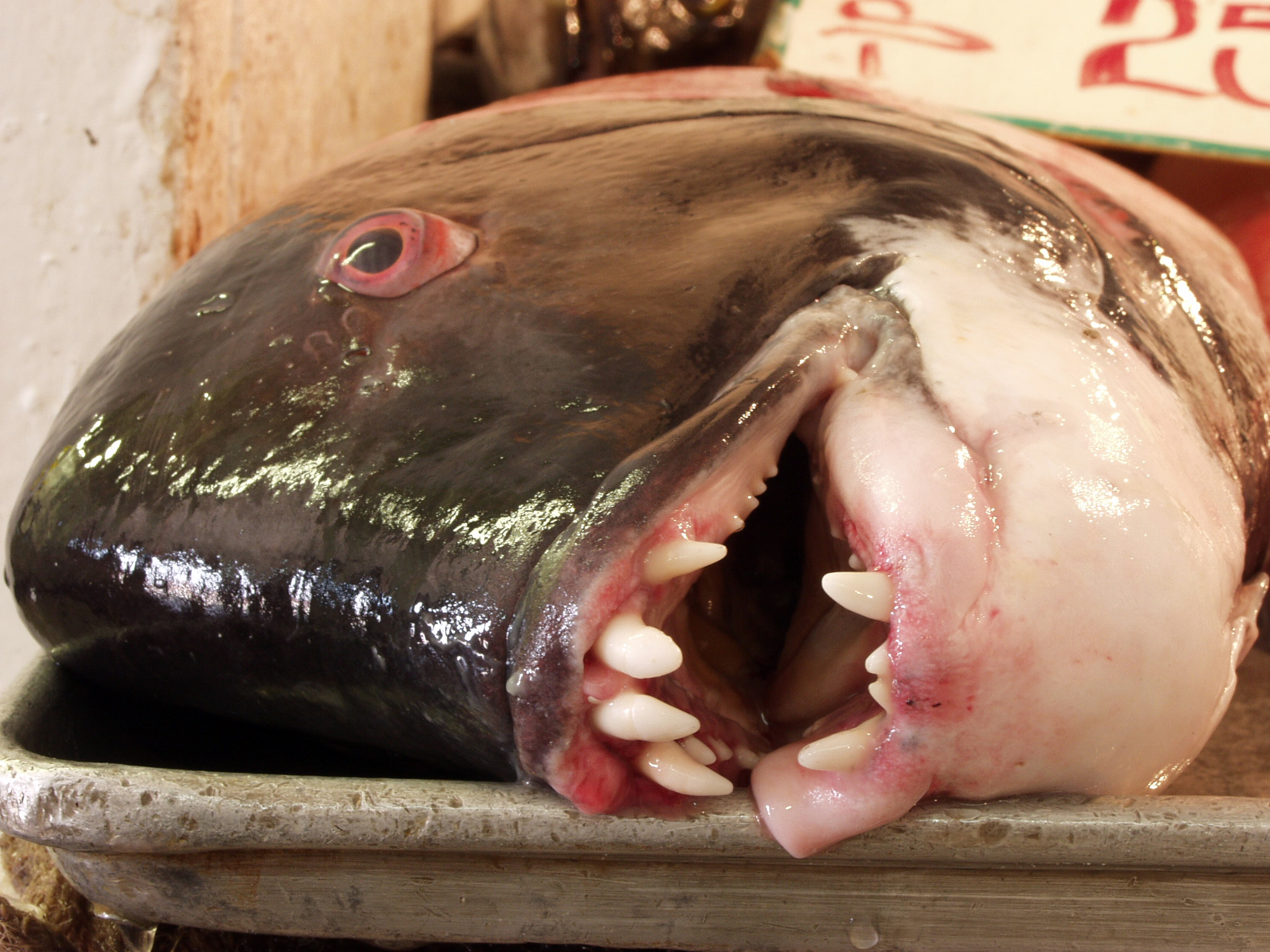
Male, at a fish market

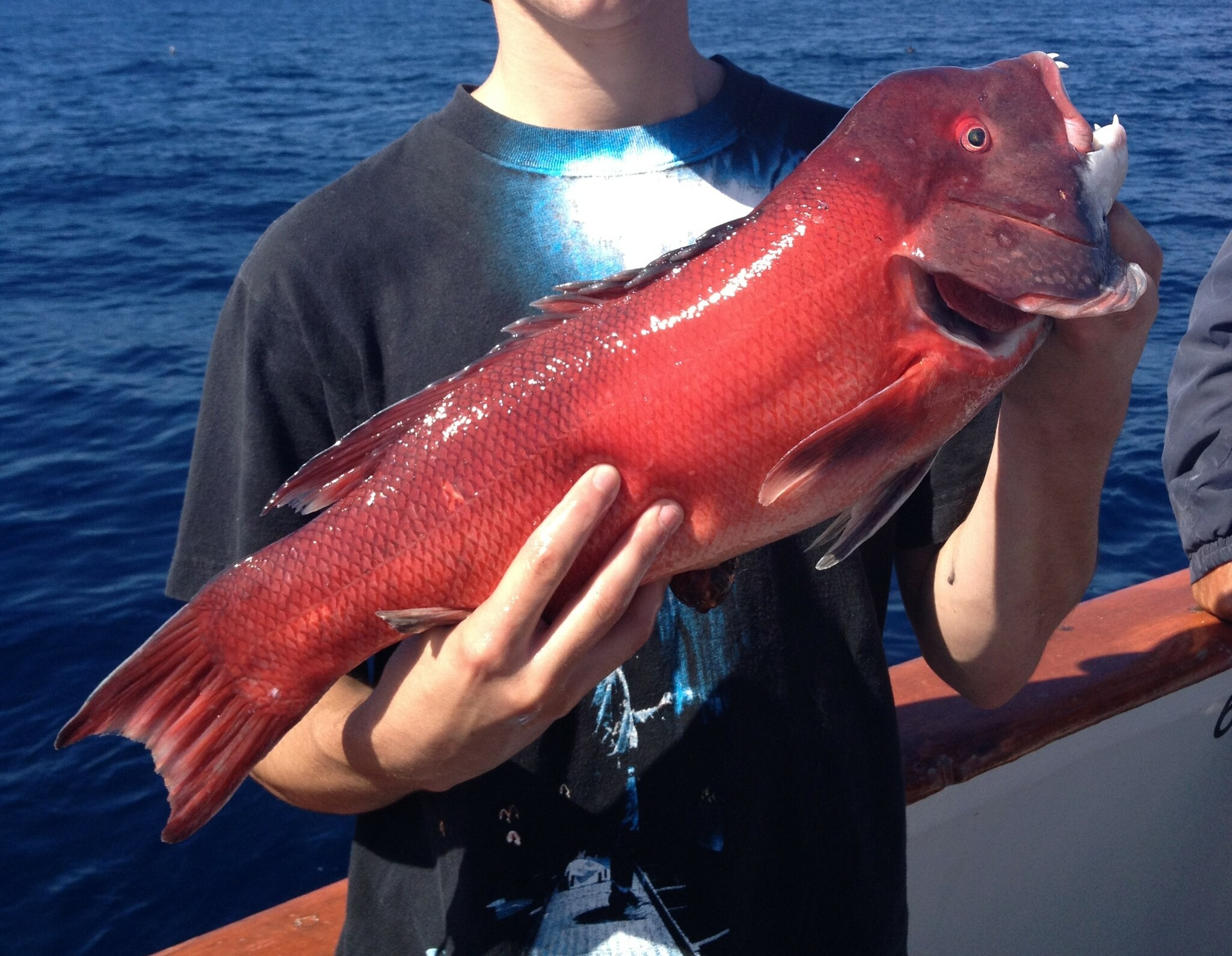
Male, caught on a fishing line.

The fishery for this species, which began in at least the late 1800s (for salted fish), peaked in 1928 with landings of 370,000 lb (170,000 kg). This may have been because the species was easily available close to port, and has maintained a presence in the California nearshore fishery. From the 1940s to 1980s, little interest in the sheephead was shown, and catches were usually under 10,000 lb (4,500 kg). In the later 1980s, commercial fisheries began to supply live fish to Asian markets and restaurants. The fisheries grew rapidly, with sheephead becoming a large share of the catches. Because restaurant aquariums are small, commercial fisheries seek small, juvenile sheephead, usually females before they have reproduced.

California sheephead are fished by anglers and spearfishers for food, and are caught live for the aquarium trade. The recreational and commercial catch of sheephead in 1999 was estimated at over 132,000 fish. Mainly juveniles are included in important commercial trap fishery, with juveniles and smaller adults dominating the hook and line and recreational fishery. In 2009, fishing vessels generated $333,801 in revenue from sheephead, much of that due to the lucrative live fish industry in Asian markets. California sheephead are ecologically valuable as keystone predators on purple sea urchins and red sea urchins, keeping them from overgrazing kelp forests. Thus, where they are present, sheephead contribute to the growth and biodiversity of kelp forests, and the corresponding increase in populations of other commercially valuable fish species that are dependent on kelp habitat, such as kelp bass and white seabass.

=== Conservation status ===
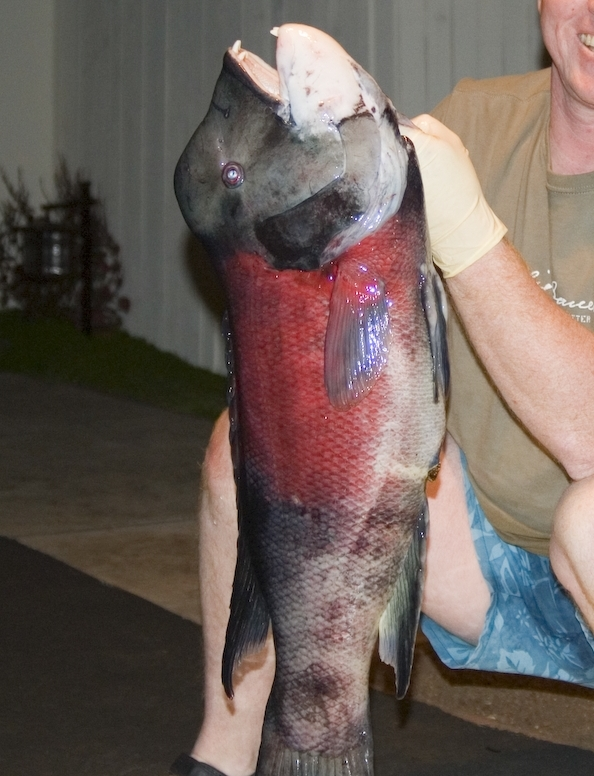
Large male, caught spearfishing

The California sheephead is considered a vulnerable species because of its high fishing rates off of the coast of Southern California. Usually most of the fish caught are the largest males, causing a shortage in males in the population and the subsequent morphogenesis of the largest females to males. This, in turn, creates a deficiency in the number of eggs produced and weakens the population in a particular fishing area. Male numbers seem typically low which also could result in sperm limitation for the species, with further male reduction, resulting in reduced reproductive output: males are readily targeted in the recreational spear fishery. Commercial and recreational fishing pressure has increased (there is also an artisanal sector), and this has caused catches to decline over the last decade. To control the catches of sheephead and prevent overfishing, the California Department of Fish and Game in 2001 established regulations that restrict the catch size of sheephead and the areas where these fish may be caught.

Size restrictions on sheephead were fairly minimal before 1999 for both the recreational and commercial fisheries. But, in 1999, the California Department of Fish and Wildlife set the minimum catch size for the commercial fishery to 12 in or 30 cm (total length) and followed with the same size limit for the recreational fishery in 2001. To further decrease commercial harvest, the minimum commercial harvest size was increased to 13 in 2001 and the 10-fish recreational bag limit was reduced to five. In 2023, the recreational bag limit was further reduced to 2.
