= Fat Head =

2009 film by Tom Naughton

- Theatrical release poster
- Directed by: Tom Naughton
- Written by: Tom Naughton
- Produced by: Susan Smiley; Page Ostrow
- Starring: Tom Naughton; Chareva Naughton
- Cinematography: Tom Naughton
- Edited by: Tom Naughton
- Music by: Tom Monahan
- Production companies: Middle Road Pictures; Vine Street Pictures in association with Ostrow & Company
- Distributed by: Morningstar Entertainment
- Release date: February 3, 2009
- Running time: 104 minutes
- Country: United States
- Language: English

Fat Head is a 2009 American documentary film directed by and starring comedian Tom Naughton. The film seeks to refute both the documentary Super Size Me and the lipid hypothesis, a theory of nutrition started in the early 1950s in the United States by Ancel Keys and promoted in much of the Western world.

== Production ==
Naughton first saw Super Size Me as part of his research into a comedy piece he was working on about prejudice against fat people, saying, "I watched Super Size Me as part of my research. But the premise and the rather large gaps in logic annoyed me so much, I decided I needed to create a reply. I know some other filmmakers went on McDiets and documented how they lost weight, but as far as I could tell, they weren't funny. If it's true what Mencken said, that the cure for contempt is counter-contempt, then the cure for a funny documentary that's full of bologna is a funny documentary that isn't."

In 2013, Naughton released a director's cut of Fat Head on DVD. It includes some slight re-edits, a section at the end of updates in the science in the years since the film came out, and Naughton detailing his family's dietary changes ever since.

== Synopsis ==
In Fat Head, Tom Naughton questions the claims and ideas expressed by Morgan Spurlock in the film Super Size Me, in which Spurlock exclusively ate McDonald's food for 30 days. Naughton, who examines the nutritional information in McDonald's menu, is skeptical of Spurlock's doctor's statement that Spurlock was consuming 5,000 calories a day, and is unable to obtain Spurlock's food log from Spurlock's representatives. Naughton's website includes a page that lists every item he ate during his month-long experiment, including the nutritional information of his diet. Naughton also criticizes his inference from Super Size Me that consumers are unaware that fast food is high in calories, and argues that no one is forced to eat fast food, as fast food restaurants merely cater to consumer demand, and that if fast food restaurants did not exist, people would satisfy that demand by eating the same food at other restaurants or at home. Naughton also questions Spurlock's claim that his 30-day diet resulted in signs of addiction, in light of the fact that Spurlock apparently had no difficulty in ceasing eating fast food at the end of his experiment.

Naughton addresses Spurlock's argument that the current prevalence of obesity cannot have been caused by home cooking or by non-corporate, family-owned restaurants, since they have been around longer than corporate fast food chains. Naughton says that the food people eat at many family-owned restaurants is the same unhealthy food eaten at fast food chains, and that the reason the former did not make people obese is because during his generation's youth, families would only eat at them a handful of times a year, and not frequently, as some people do at fast food restaurants. Naughton and his interviewees say that anti-McDonald's sentiment is motivated by anticonsumerism, the desire by lawyers to sue rich corporations rather than family restaurants of comparatively modest means, and paternalism by advocacy groups like the Center for Science in the Public Interest. Naughton challenges the notion that the United States is experiencing an obesity epidemic by pointing out that the Centers for Disease Control, which made that assertion in 2004, recanted it the following year. Naughton also questions the use of the body mass index to calculate whether someone is overweight, pointing out that according to the BMI, he himself is considered obese. However, according to the BMI chart for men, at 5'11" and 206.5 lbs, Naughton is merely considered overweight, which challenges one of the main premises behind the film that he is considered obese but appears not to be. Naughton's physician tells him that he is obese based on his body fat percentage, which may have led to this confusion.

The documentary also focuses on the science and politics behind the nutrition recommendations given by the U.S. government, largely based on the lipid hypothesis, which Fat Head claims is in error on all three of its main propositions. The film claims that the lipid hypothesis has no basis in scientific fact. According to the film, among other sources such as Mark Sisson, there has never been a single scientific study that has linked a high fat diet to increased rates of heart disease. During the film several doctors and dietitians were interviewed and they all stated that according to the latest research in heart disease, it is inflammation and not a diet high in saturated fat that causes heart disease and heart attacks, some of whom say the inflammation is specifically caused by high blood sugar.

During the film, Naughton goes on an all-fast-food diet, mainly eating food from McDonald's. For his daily dietary intake, he aims to keep his calories to around 2,000 and his carbohydrates to around 100 grams per day, but he does not restrict fat at all. He ends up eating about 100 grams of fat per day, of which about 50 grams are saturated. He also decides to walk six nights a week, instead of his usual three. After a month eating that way, he loses 12 pounds and his total cholesterol goes down, without lowering his HDL, also known as good cholesterol.

At the end of his experiment, Naughton details an additional experiment inspired by his research into the lipid hypothesis. In this second experiment, he cuts out most sugars and starches from his diet for a month, eating foods such as cheeseburgers without buns, eggs and bacon fried in butter, steaks, Polish sausage, fruit in heavy cream, and green vegetables in butter. He uses coconut oil to fry onions for his cheeseburgers and eats fried shredded cheese as a snack. As a result, Naughton says that his energy level and mood have suffered no harmful effects, despite him often working until 2 AM on a large programming project with a tight deadline. At the end of the month, his overall cholesterol has dropped from 222 to 209, with his LDL having dropped from 156 to 130 and his HDL having increased from 49 to 64.

== Critical reception ==
The Houston Chronicle said Fat Head "is similar in premise to Super Size Me and is just as funny but with a very different ending."

Chris Neilson of DVD Talk criticized how Naughton selectively presents information that could be considered critical, such as LDL levels at baseline and experiment terminus. William Lee of DVD Verdict similarly considered that, despite the middle part where experts are interviewed and concepts such as cholesterol are explained, the intention of debunking dietary myths "is lost in the ill-conceived, confrontational presentation of Fat Head".
