= Pelman v. McDonald's Corporation =

American court case

Pelman v. McDonald's Corporation was a court case involving a group of New York City teenagers who claimed that the fast food from McDonald's caused their obesity.

The plaintiffs, Ashley Pelman, 14, and Jazlyn Bradley, 19, among others, said they did not know how fattening the food was and complained of high blood pressure and high cholesterol, among other ailments. One plaintiff, a 600-pound 15-year-old, said he ate McDonald's everyday. Lawyers argued advertising to children helped foster a trust of the food's nutritional value.

Judge Robert W. Sweet dismissed the case in 2003 and said "it is not the place of the law to protect them against their own excesses". However, the plaintiffs appealed to United States Court of Appeals for the Second Circuit, and in 2005 the circuit court vacated the district court's dismissal and reinstated some of the claims as incorrectly dismissed. Ultimately, the lawsuit failed when it was denied class-action status in 2010.

== See also ==
- Compensation culture
- McDonald's legal cases
- Liebeck v. McDonald's Restaurants
