= List of films about food and drink =

This is a list of films about food and drink.

== Films about food and drink ==
=== Documentary films ===
- All in This Tea
- American Beer
- Beer Wars
- Bill W.
- A Bite of China
- Black Coffee
- Black Gold
- Blood into Wine
- Chez Schwartz
- Dive!
- Fat Head
- Fine Food, Fine Pastries, Open 6 to 9
- The Five Obstructions
- Food, Inc.
- The Fruit Hunters
- Garlic Is as Good as Ten Mothers
- Global Steak
- Gutbusters
- I Like Killing Flies
- Ingredients
- Jiro Dreams of Sushi
- Kings of Pastry
- Know Your Mushrooms
- A Matter of Taste
- Mondovino
- Off the Menu: The Last Days of Chasen's
- Our Daily Bread
- Paavo, a Life in Five Courses
- Pennsylvania Diners and Other Roadside Restaurants
- A Place at the Table
- Red Obsession
- The Restaurant Inspector
- The Search for General Tso
- Soul Food Junkies
- State of Bacon
- A State of Vine
- Super Size Me
- Super Size Me 2: Holy Chicken!
- Terminal Bar
- Unacceptable Levels
- Wine for the Confused

==== Vegetarianism ====
- Devour the Earth
- Earthlings
- Fat, Sick and Nearly Dead
- Food Matters
- Forks Over Knives
- Go Further
- Meet Your Meat
- Peaceable Kingdom
- Planeat
- A Sacred Duty
- Vegucated

=== Soft drinks ===
- Bosko's Soda Fountain
- The Coca-Cola Kid
- The Cola Conquest
- The Gods Must Be Crazy
- One, Two, Three

=== Coffee ===
- Barista
- Black Coffee (2007 film)
- Black Gold
- Café. Waiting. Love
- Christmas in July

=== Beer ===
- American Beer
- Beer Wars
- Beerfest
- Un bon bock
- Cheer Boys Cheer
- Drinking Buddies
- The Fight with the Dragon
- The Frankenstein Brothers
- Krazy Kat Invalid
- Monks, Girls and Hungarian Soldiers
- Old Man Drinking a Glass of Beer
- Schwechater
- Smokey and the Bandit
- Song of the Eagle
- Take This Job and Shove It
- What! No Beer?
- The World's End

=== Wine ===
- At Sachem Farm
- Autumn Tale
- Back to Burgundy
- Barolo Boys
- The Birth of Saké
- Blood into Wine
- Bottle Shock
- The Enchanted Drawing
- Eye of the Devil
- Fine Gold
- German Wine
- A Good Year
- Laughing Heirs
- A Man About the House
- Mondovino
- Les Raisins de la Mort
- Red Obsession
- Saint-Amour
- The Secret of Santa Vittoria
- Sideways (2004)
- Sideways (2009)
- Somm
- Somm 3
- Somm: Into the Bottle
- Sour Grapes
- A State of Vine
- Story of Wine
- Terroir
- This Earth Is Mine
- Uncorked
- Uncorked (2020)
- Vagabond
- The Vineyard
- A Walk in the Clouds
- Wine Country
- Wine for the Confused
- The Winemaker of Langenlois
- Year of the Comet

=== Restaurants ===
- Al Dente
- Betty Boop's Bizzy Bee
- Big Night
- The Big Restaurant
- The Bob's Burgers Movie
- Bosko's Soda Fountain
- Bread of Happiness
- Burnt
- Cafe Isobe
- Chef (2014)
- The Chef (2012)
- Choke
- Clerks II
- Cocktail
- La colmena
- Combination Platter
- Compliance
- The Cook, the Thief, His Wife & Her Lover
- Diner
- The Dinner
- Dinner Rush
- Double Patty
- East Side Sushi
- The Encounter
- Estômago
- Extreme Job
- The Founder
- Give Me a Book of Complaints
- The God of Ramen
- Good Burger
- Gravy
- Hash House Blues
- A Hound for Trouble
- The Hundred-Foot Journey
- I'm Livin' It
- Iamhere
- Izakaya Chōji
- Jiro Dreams of Sushi
- Kamome Shokudo
- The Kitchen in Paris
- Krazy Kat & Ignatz Mouse Discuss the Letter 'G'
- Lights in the Dusk
- Little Italy
- Love's Kitchen
- Maska
- Melvin Goes to Dinner
- The Menu
- Monsieur Albert
- Mostly Martha
- My Dinner with Andre
- Mystic Pizza
- No Reservations
- The Other Side of Hope
- Perfect Sense
- The Petrified Forest
- Porky's Last Stand
- The Princess and the Frog
- Ratatouille
- The Secret of the Grain
- Service for Ladies (1927)
- Service for Ladies (1932)
- The Slammin' Salmon
- Soul Kitchen
- Spin
- Still Waiting...
- Summer in Tyrol
- Super Size Me
- Super Size Me 2: Holy Chicken!
- Tampopo
- Today's Special
- Trip for Tat
- Vienna Tales
- Waiter!
- Waiting...
- West Bank Story
- When You Comin' Back, Red Ryder?
- The White Horse Inn (1926)
- The White Horse Inn (1935)
- The White Horse Inn (1952)
- The White Horse Inn (1960)

=== Confectionery/Desserts ===
- The Cakemaker
- Charlie and the Chocolate Factory
- Chocolat
- Hoodwinked!
- Hoodwinked Too! Hood vs. Evil
- Hop
- Kings of Pastry
- Lessons in Chocolate
- Merci pour le Chocolat
- Patisserie Coin de rue
- Tom and Jerry: Willy Wonka and the Chocolate Factory
- Willy Wonka & the Chocolate Factory
- Wonka

=== Miscellaneous ===
- The Angels' Share
- Aqua Teen Hunger Force Colon Movie Film for Theaters
- The Attack of the Giant Moussaka
- Attack of the Killer Tomatoes
- Basmati Blues
- Cloudy with a Chance of Meatballs
- Cloudy with a Chance of Meatballs 2
- Criminally Insane
- Criminally Insane 2
- Fast Food Nation
- Feast
- Foodfight!
- Foodiverse
- Un gallo con muchos huevos
- Killer Tomatoes Eat France!
- Killer Tomatoes Strike Back!
- The Nuttiest Nutcracker
- Otra Película de Huevos y un Pollo
- Over the Hedge
- Una Película de Huevos
- Un rescate de huevitos
- Return of the Killer Tomatoes!
- Sausage Party
- The Scarecrow
- Soylent Green
- Strange Brew
- Whisky Galore!
- White Lightning

== Feature films about cooking ==
- Babette's Feast
- Barbie: A Fairy Secret
- Barbie: A Fashion Fairytale
- Big Night
- The Big Restaurant
- Burnt
- Chef (2014)
- The Chef (2012)
- The Chinese Feast
- Chocolat
- The Cook, the Thief, His Wife & Her Lover
- Cook Up a Storm
- Cooking with Stella
- Dinner Rush
- Eat Drink Man Woman
- Eddie's Million Dollar Cook-Off
- Estômago
- The God of Cookery
- Le Grand Chef
- Le Grand Chef 2: Kimchi Battle
- La Grande Bouffe
- Gulabjaam (2018)
- Ham and Eggs
- Haute Cuisine
- The Hundred-Foot Journey
- Jiro Dreams of Sushi
- Julie & Julia
- Just Desserts
- Kings of Pastry
- Krazy Kat & Ignatz Mouse Discuss the Letter 'G'
- Kung Fu Chefs
- Like Water for Chocolate
- Mostly Martha
- My Breakfast with Blassie
- My Dinner with Andre
- No Reservations
- Now, Forager
- Osaka Wrestling Restaurant
- Pieces of April
- The Platform
- The Princess and the Frog
- The Ramen Girl
- Ratatouille
- Salaam Namaste
- Simply Irresistible
- The Slammin' Salmon
- Soul Food
- Soul Kitchen
- Sweet Bean
- Tampopo
- Today's Special
- Tortilla Soup
- A Touch of Spice
- Tsukiji Uogashi Sandaime
- Vatel
- Waitress
- Who Is Killing the Great Chefs of Europe?
- The Wing or the Thigh
- Woman on Top

== See also ==
- List of documentary films about agriculture
- List of websites about food and drink
- Lists of films
- Outline of film
