= CinemAsia Film Festival =

Film festival in the Netherlands

- Location: Amsterdam, Netherlands
- Language: International
- Website: www.cinemasia.nl

CinemAsia Film Festival (Amsterdam, the Netherlands) is a leading Asian film festival in Europe. The first edition of CinemAsia was in 2004 and started as a biannual film festival. Since 2012, the festival is an annual film festival held in March. The festival has a focus on independent Asian films, and the film program consists of the best and most recent fiction and documentary in all genres from Asia. In this way the festival enhances the Asian visibility in culture and media. The most famous awards of the festival are the Audience Award and the Jury Award.

== History ==
When the San Francisco-born, Hong Kong-raised director Doris Yeung moved to Amsterdam in 2002, she immediately started looking for ways to contribute to Asian culture in The Netherlands positively. Less than a year later, CinemAsia saw its inception, and in March 2004, the very first edition of the new, biannual film festival saw the light in Amsterdam's Rialto film theater. Screening 29 films from 12 countries over the span of 5 days, and with an added focus on Asian diaspora and queer cinema, the first edition of the CinemAsia Film Festival was an instant success. The festival was immediately lauded for the way it managed to intimately introduce new audiences to the world of Asian cinema, positively reshaping the Dutch collective consciousness about the continent in the process. In 2006, Yeung created the CinemAsia FilmLAB program to give young Asian talent the opportunity to make their own stories into films and to enable them to see their realities reflected on screen come true. 2012 marked the year that the CinemAsia Film Festival went annual, having outgrown its biannual programming and locations like De Ketelhuis. As the festival's size, popularity and frequency grew, so did its ability to offer talented new filmmakers a creative platform and provide Dutch audiences with the best Asian cinema has to offer. In the past years, CinemAsia had different locations in Amsterdam. During a long time, the main location of the festival was the film theatre Kriterion, and since 2020, the new main location is Studio/K. Since the beginning, film theatre Rialto has always been one of the locations of the festival. In the time between the editions of the festivals, CinemAsia held different theme events during the year. The theme of the event depends on an actual topic, a historical topic or a new experimental event. Today, CinemAsia is internationally renowned for its broad yet focused selection of Asian independent films, documentaries, shorts, arthouse films and commercial blockbusters.

== Mission ==
CinemAsia's objectives are equivocal: they serve a cultural cause by stimulating the presence of Asian cinema within the Dutch film supply, and they serve a societal cause by offering a creative platform to Dutch Asians and content creators. Being the only Pan-Asian festival in the Netherlands, CinemAsia also strives to connect various Asian communities through connections that transcend ethnic provenance. Having good relations with multiple Asian communities, CinemAsia aims to bring them together through its festival, in particular through its creative platform for Dutch and Asian filmmakers. The festival especially values the presence of independent Asian films made outside of Asia. These so-called Asian diaspora films touch on the migration and scatteredness of Asians throughout the globe, and are of great societal value due to their ability to invoke a sense of recognition throughout the Asian public in The Netherlands. They also manage to uniquely capture Asia's cultural diversity, and expose the various ways it can be perceived by different communities. By showing both the similarities and differences between the various Asian regions and cultures through the experiences and observations of Asian filmmakers, the festival hopes to properly reflect Asia's societal and cultural diversity.

== FilmLAB ==
In 2006 CinemAsia FilmLAB was created by Doris Yeung to support the mission of CinemAsia to create a better and more diverse representation of people with an Asian background within the Netherlands. The purpose of FilmLAB is to give young Asian talent the chance to make their stories from an Asian perspective into film for a broad audience. The selected filmmakers receive a small budget to make a documentary or a short film that is presented at the festival. In this way FilmLAB connects young Asian filmmakers with Dutch film and give them the opportunity to enter the Dutch film-and media industry. It is also a possibility to improve the diversity within the film sector and to stimulate cross-cultural collaboration, knowledge share and networking.

FilmLAB programs

- FilmLAB Shorts Program
- ScriptLAB
- FilmLAB Alumni Network

== Awards ==
=== Competition Jury Award ===
In 2014 this new award was introduced as a prize for best film. The competition brings films from both new and established talents that showcases a strong filmmaking vision, shifts cinematic boundaries and/or presents subjects with groundbreaking effects. Since 2018 there is also an award for best director and best performer.

Best Film

Year	Title	Original title	Director	Country
2014	Night Flight (2014 film)	Ya-gan-bi-haeng	Leesong Hee-il	South Korea
2015	The Coffin in the Mountain	Xin mi gong	Xin Yukun	China
2016	Zinnia Flower	Bai ri gaobie	Tom Shu-yu Lun	Taiwan
2017	Diamond Island (film)		Davy Chou	Cambodia, Germany, Qatar, Thailand
2018	Bad Genius	Chalard games goeng	Nattawut Poonpiriya	Thailand
2019	Tumbbad		Rahi Anil Barve, Anand Gandhi, Adesh Prasad	India
2020	Balloon	气球	Pema Tseden	China
2022	Missing	さがす	Shinzo Katayama	Japan
2022	Special Mention: Aloners	혼자 사는 사람들	Hong Sung-eun	South Korea
2023	Small, Slow but Steady	ケイコ 目を澄ませて	Sho Miyake	Japan, France
2023	Special Mention: Autobiography		Makbul Mubarak	Indonesia, France, Germany, Philippines, Poland, Qatar
2024	A Song Sung Blue	小白船	Geng Zihan	China
2024	Special Mention: Asog		Seán Devlin	Canada, Philippines

Best Director

Year	Director	Title	Original title
2018	Jang Joon-hwan	1987: When the Day Comes	1987
2019	Dong Yue	The Looming Storm	Bao xue jiang zhi

Best Performer

Year	Performer	Title	Original title
2018	Kaung Myat Thu	Passage of Life	Boku no kaeru basho
2019	Duan Yihong	The Looming Storm	Bao xue jiang zhi

=== Audience Award ===
The Audience Award exists since the beginning of the festival. Each visitor of a movie is able to vote and the movie with the best score wins the award.

Year	Title	Original title	Director	Country
2006	Dumplings (film)	Gau ji	Fruit Chan	Hong Kong
2008	Getting Home	Luo ye gui gen	Zhang Yang (director)	China
2010	Castaway on the Moon	Kimssi pyoryugi	Lee Hae-jun	South Korea
2012	Say Sing		Yu Kuang-chong	Taiwan, South Korea, China
2013	The Silk Road of Pop		Ursula Engel, Sameer Farooq	Canada
2014	The God of Ramen	Râmen yori taisetsuna mono	Takashi Innami	Japan
2015	Jalanan		Daniel Ziv	Indonesia
2016	The Royal Tailor	Sang-eui-won	Lee Won-suk	South Korea
2016	The Birth of Saké		Erik Shirai	Japan
2017	Lipstick under My Burkha		Alankrita Shrivastava	India
2017	Sunday Beauty Queen		Baby Ruth Villarama	The Philippines
2018	A Taxi Driver	Taeksi woonjunsa	Jang Hoon	South Korea
2018	Small Talk (2016 film)	Ri Chang Dui Hua	Huang Hui-chen	China
2019	An Elephant Sitting Still	Da xiang xi di er zuo	Hu Bo	China
2020	Lunana: A Yak in the Classroom	ལུང་ནག་ན	Pawo Choyning Dorji	Bhutan
2022	So Long, My Son	地久天长	Wang Xiaoshuai	China
2023	DEMIGOD: The Legend Begins		Chris Huang	Taiwan
2024	Abang Adik		Jin Ong	Malaysia, Taiwan

=== Youth Jury Award ===
CinemAsia celebrated its 10th anniversary in 2017 and invoked a new award where the jury consists of students. The theme of the award was in 2017 and in 2018 the best film made by a first-time director. In 2019 was the year to commemorate the centennial of women's suffrage and the prize was for the best film directed or co-directed by a female director.

Year	Title	Original title	Director	Country
2017	Mad World (film)	Yat nim mou ming	Wong Chung	Hong Kong
2018	The Great Buddha+		Huang Hsin-Yao	Taiwan
2019	Turning 18		Chao-ti Ho	Taiwan
2020	Complicity	コンプリシティ	Kei Chikaura	Japan

== Events ==
During the CinemAsia film festival there is a side program with different activities. Each festival has different events like panels, talks and workshops mostly based on the theme of the festival. An annual tradition is the Friday evening karaoke party. One of the founding principles of the festival is to give a platform to express and celebrate the (Asian) LGBTQ community. In each edition of the festival is a special LGBTQ+ program where visitors can participate in discussions, exhibitions, presentations and workshops about the queer community. FilmLAB has its own events. The most important event is the program with the premiere of the movies produced by FilmLAB. Alternately there are other events like sessions, panels, the FilmLAB Network Borrel. There is also a FilmLAB Jam Session where starting filmmakers are able to discuss their current film projects. In the weekend visitors can enjoy the food bazaar. As the name suggests the food bazaar offers a various selection of Asian snacks and meals from multiple vendors. It is the perfect opportunity to try Asian food in combination with a movie to imagine yourself completely in Asia. During the year CinemAsia organize different theme events to give the audience the chance to enjoy Asian cinema.

== See also ==
- List of film festivals in Europe
- Hallyu
- Indonesian Diaspora
- Cinema of Korea
- Cinema of Indonesia
- Cinema of Japan
- Cinema of Thailand
- Cinema of China
- Cinema of Hong Kong
