= List of documentary films about agriculture =

This is a list of documentary films about agriculture. A documentary film is a nonfictional motion picture intended to document some aspect of reality, primarily for the purposes of instruction or maintaining a historical record. Agriculture is the cultivation of animals, plants, fungi, and other life forms for food, fiber, biofuel, medicinals and other products used to sustain and enhance human life.

== Documentary films about agriculture ==
- Bangaarada Manushya
- All in This Tea
- Bananas!*
- Bananas Unpeeled
- The Biggest Little Farm
- A Cow at My Table
- The Dark Side of Chocolate
- Democratic Allsorts
- Dirt! The Movie
- Everyday Life in a Syrian Village
- Farmland
- The Farmer's Wife
- Food, Inc.
- Fresh
- The Fruit Hunters
- The Future of Food
- The Garden
- God's Country
- The Grain That Built a Hemisphere
- The Great Resistance
- H-2 Worker
- Harvest (1967)
- The Harvest (2010)
- The Harvest Shall Come
- Henry Browne, Farmer
- Het is een schone dag geweest
- In Grave Danger of Falling Food
- Keep the Hives Alive
- King Corn
- Kiss the Ground
- Let It Be
- Life at the End of the Rainbow
- The Moo Man
- More Than Honey
- Mugabe and the White African
- Old Partner
- Olives and Their Oil
- Our Daily Bread
- Paper Wheat
- Peaceable Kingdom
- Pig Business
- A Place in the Land
- The Plow That Broke the Plains
- The Real Dirt on Farmer John
- The River
- Standing Silent Nation
- Strawberry Fields
- Sweetgrass
- The Tale of the Wonderful Potato
- That Should Not Be: Our Children Will Accuse Us
- Touchstone: Dancing With Angels
- Troublesome Creek: A Midwestern
- We Feed the World
- The World According to Monsanto
- World of Plenty

== See also ==
- List of documentary films
- List of films about food and drink
- Lists of films
- Outline of film
