= Arnold van Huis =

Dutch entomologist

Arnold van Huis (born 1946, Wormerveer, North Holland, Netherlands) is a Professor of Tropical Entomology at Wageningen University in the Netherlands.

== Biography ==
Van Huis studied as an undergraduate at the State Horticultural College in Utrecht, and as a graduate student at Wageningen University. From 1974 to 1979, he worked for the Food and Agriculture Organization of the United Nations (FAO) in Nicaragua.

In 2014, van Huis co-authored The Insect Cookbook: Food for a Sustainable Planet (Arts and Traditions of the Table: Perspectives on Culinary History).

== Work and positions ==
Van Huis researches edible insects and advocates human entomophagy, the consumption of insects by humans, and coordinates the research program Sustainable production of Insect Proteins for human consumption (SUPRO2). The program investigates the nutritive and environmental aspects of insect farming and consumption, e.g. of weaver ants.

In the 2010 French documentary Global Steak, he says that locusts can produce 1 kg protein from 2 kg fodder compared to a cow needing 10 kg fodder to produce the same amount of protein. Other benefits are that locusts do not produce greenhouse gases and do not need antibiotics.
