= Barcade =

American company

Coordinates: 40°42′43.3″N 73°57′04″W

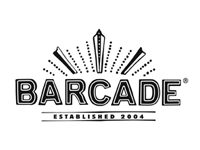

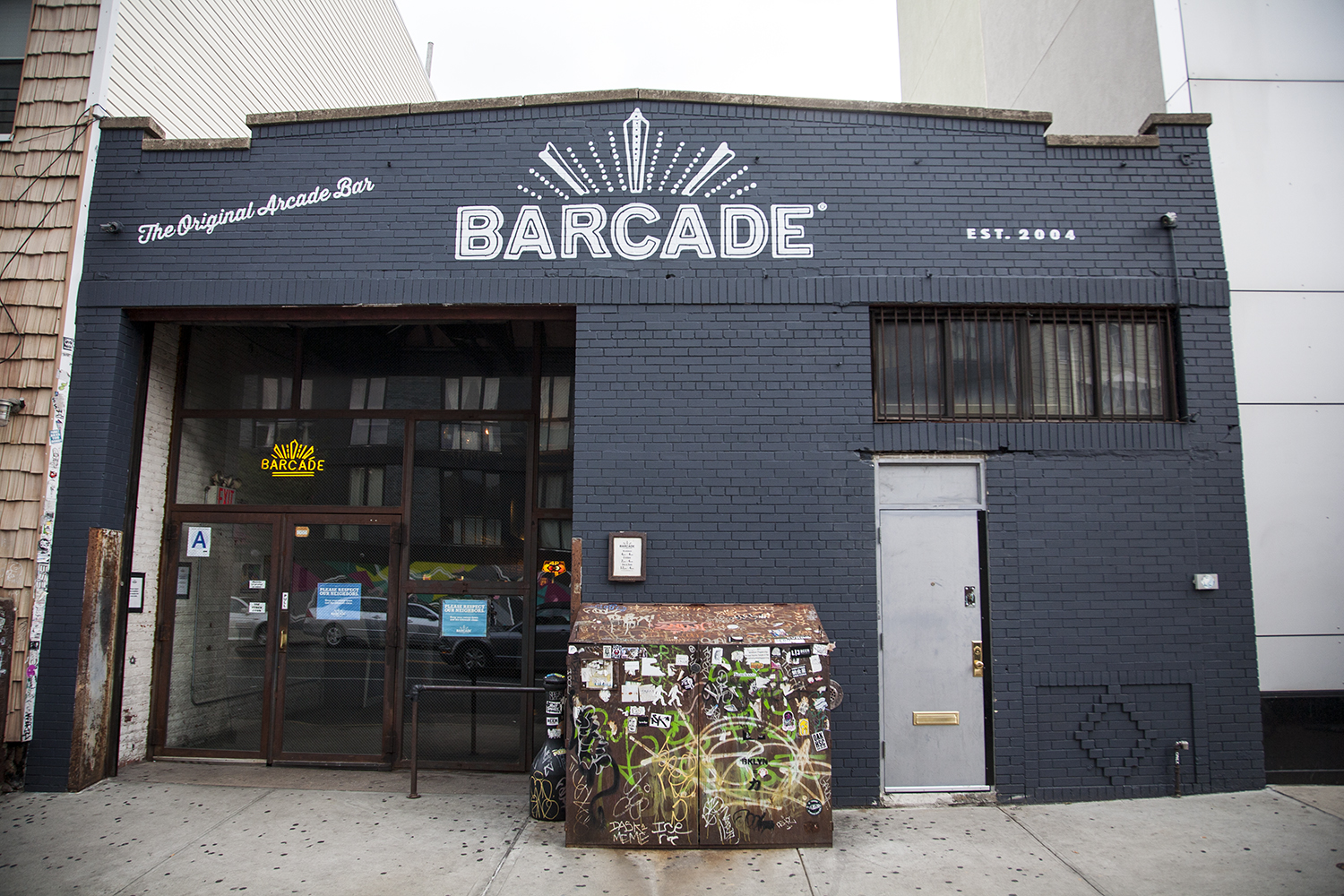
- Barcade in Brooklyn
- Industry: Bar, restaurant, and classic arcade games
- Founded: October 1, 2004 in Brooklyn, NY
- Website: barcade.com

Barcade is a chain of arcade bars with locations in the northeastern United States, Los Angeles, and Detroit. First opened in Brooklyn on October 1, 2004, the venues feature a mix of classic video games and pinball and serve American craft beers.

== History ==
The first Barcade opened in 2004 in a former metal shop at 388 Union Avenue in the Williamsburg section of Brooklyn, and features a combination of vintage arcade games and American craft beers. The company is owned and operated by four long-time friends: brothers Kevin Beard and Scott Beard, Pete Langway and Paul Kermizian (director of American Beer).

The combination of classic video games and craft beer proved successful, and the brand expanded into Jersey City, New Jersey, and the Fishtown neighborhood of Philadelphia, Pennsylvania. Barcade later opened two locations in Manhattan, including a location in St. Mark's Place. Over the next two years, locations opened in New Haven, Connecticut and Newark, New Jersey. In the summer of 2017 plans were announced for two new locations that would expand the company to Detroit, Michigan and Los Angeles, California. The Los Angeles location opened in May 2019. After a long delay due to the COVID-19 pandemic, the Detroit location opened in August 2021. The location in Newark, New Jersey became the first in the company's history to close, when it shuttered in September, 2022. The company opened a second Philadelphia location in Center City, Philadelphia in December 2023 in the ground floor of the ornate, Gothic-style Hale Building, designed by Willis G. Hale in 1887. The Jersey City, New Jersey location closed in the spring of 2025 when the lease ended and the building was set for redevelopment. Later that year, the company opened a third location in Manhattan on Cortlandt Street (Manhattan) in part of the former Century 21 (department store) flagship location.

In the summer of 2024, Barcade partnered with Rockefeller Center and ran a family friendly pop-up arcade in the ice rink's skate hut. The pop-up ran from June until the end of September.

Barcade registered its name as a federal trademark in 2007, and has successfully defended it in court, while also becoming well known for aggressively pursuing any infringements on the mark.

== Notable patrons ==
A number of world record holders for classic games frequent the Brooklyn Barcade location, including Hank Chien, who set the world record in Donkey Kong with a score of 1,061,700 in March 2010. George Leutz set the world record on Q*bert in February 2013 with a score of 37,163,080 after spending years practicing on the machine in Brooklyn's Barcade. Joshua Lombay set the world record for the 1984 Midway game Timber in June 2013 with a score of 9,767,550 after having discovered the game and playing for the first time at Barcade in Brooklyn.

In June 2021, the Barcade location on St. Mark's Place in Manhattan was the site of a rare public date between Rihanna and ASAP Rocky. The bar received some unwanted attention for checking the couple's IDs before eventually allowing them entry.
