= Huang Hui-zhen =

Taiwanese film director

- Born: 1978; Taipei, Taiwan
- Occupations: Director, producer, writer
- Years active: 2006–present
- Known for: Small Talk

Huang Hui-zhen (born 1978, Taipei, Taiwan) is a Taiwanese documentary filmmaker.

== Early life ==
At the age of 6, Huang began participating in traditional funeral ceremonies known as Qian Wang Ge Zhen (the Soul-guiding Singing Array) with her mother. Due to her father's long-term domestic violence, her mother took kids away from home. Huang dropped out of school in the third grade and joined her mother in performing funeral rituals across Taiwan to make a living.

== Career ==
In 1998, Taiwanese filmmaker Yang Li-zhou made a documentary about young girls involved in funeral processions, with the 20-year-old Huang as one of the subjects. During the filming, she learned what a documentary was. Huang bought a small home video camera to document her own life. She took a documentary filmmaking course at the New Taipei City Luzhou Community University and became actively involved in social movements.

During her involvement in social activism, Huang created two short documentaries about foreign laborers, Hospital Wing 8 East and Uchan Is Going Home (Chinese: 烏將要回家). At the same time, she kept filming her family, sharing her mother and her story. The Priestess Walks Alone and Small Talk are short and feature-length documentary about their story.

== Social participation ==
In 2016, she participated in the second public hearing on legalizing same-sex marriage organized by the Judicial and Legal Affairs Committee of the Legislative Yuan in Taiwan, where she spoke about her personal family experiences and her support for marriage equality.

== Filmography ==
=== Film ===
Year	Title	Role	Notes	Ref(s)
2006	Hospital Wing 8 East (八東病房）	Director, writer	Short film	
2009	Uchan Is Going Home (烏將要回家）	Director	Short film	
2016	The Priestess Walks Alone (我和我的T媽媽）	Director	Short film	
2016	Small Talk (日常對話)	Director, executive producer, writer		
2020	Loma - Our Home (LOMA - 我們的家)	Director	n/a	

== Awards ==
Year	Award	Category	Nominee(s)	Result	Ref(s)
2009	Labor Film Award	International workers Award	Uchan Is Going Home	Premium	
2016	South Award	Jury's Award	The Priestess Walks Alone	Won	
2016	South Award	Human Rights Award	The Priestess Walks Alone	Won	
2016	53rd Golden Horse Awards	Best Documentary	Small Talk	Nominated	
2016	53rd Golden Horse Awards	Best Film Editing	Jessica Lin Wan-yu	Nominated	
2017	Berlin International Film Festival	Teddy Award for Best Documentary	Small Talk	Won	
2017	17th Chinese Film Media Awards	Best Film	Small Talk	Won	
