= Kazuo Yamagishi =

Japanese ramen chef

- 山岸一雄 やまぎし かずお
- Born: April 28, 1934; Nakano, Nagano, Empire of Japan
- Died: April 1, 2015 (aged 80); Tokyo, Japan
- Occupations: Chef, businessman
- Known for: Inventor of Tsukemen

Kazuo Yamagishi (1934-2015) was a Japanese chef, who is known for inventing the tsukemen dish. He was born in Nagano Prefecture, and came upon the idea of Tsukemen at the age of 17 after seeing a co-worker eating noodles dipped in a soup bowl. In 1961, he added tsukemen, then named "special morisoba", to his Taishoken restaurant.

The 2013 documentary The God of Ramen, follows 13 years in his life.
