= Criminally Insane (film) =

- Theatrical release poster
- Directed by: Nick Millard
- Screenplay by: Nick Millard
- Produced by: Frances Millard
- Starring: Michael Flood; Priscilla Alden
- Cinematography: Karil Ostman
- Edited by: John Lincoln
- Production company: I.R.M.I. Films Corporation
- Distributed by: I.R.M.I. Films Corporation
- Release date: July 12, 1975
- Running time: 62 minutes
- Country: United States
- Language: English

Criminally Insane, (also known as Crazy Fat Ethel), is a 1975 horror film written and directed by Nick Millard. Shot on location in San Francisco, it was followed by a 1987 sequel titled Criminally Insane 2. A remake, Crazy Fat Ethel, was released in 2016.

In the film, a morbidly obese mental patient is released into the custody of her grandmother, despite a past history of violence. The grandmother tries to prevent the patient's gorging behavior by locking the cupboard, but she ends up killed by her own granddaughter, who goes on to kill further victims and hide the corpses in the grandmother's house. Her efforts to dispose of the bodies backfire and alert a neighbor.

== Plot ==
The morbidly obese Ethel Janowski has been institutionalized because of her bouts of depression and violence, but is being released into her grandmother's care despite Dr. Gerard's unease about her discharge. Upon moving into her grandmother's home, Ethel consumes massive amounts of food, repeatedly and harshly claiming that the institution employees had tried to starve her to death. Mrs. Janowski tries to stop Ethel's gorging by emptying the refrigerator and locking the cupboards, and Ethel indignantly battles her. When Mrs. Janowski threatens to call Dr. Gerard, Ethel stabs her grandmother to death, then stabs her hand to get the cabinet key she was grasping in a death grip.

Ethel locks her grandmother's corpse in a bedroom and places an order for more food. When delivery boy Glen Dickie arrives with the groceries, Ethel does not have nearly enough money, and she stabs Dickie with a broken bottle when he tries to leave with the order. Ethel's prostitute sister Rosalie arrives and announces that she will be staying for a few days. Ethel ignores calls from her doctor and attempts to cover up the odor of her decaying victims when Rosalie complains about the smell coming from the locked bedroom.

At a bar one night, Rosalie runs into John, her unfaithful, abusive ex-boyfriend and pimp. John follows Rosalie home and manages to get on her good side, and the two have sex in her bed. Dr. Gerard visits, wanting to know why Ethel has been missing her appointments with him. Ethel bludgeons the doctor with a candlestick holder and puts his body with the others. Three days after the murder of the delivery boy, Detective Sergeant McDonough visits to question Ethel about his disappearance, and leaves after Ethel gives a few evasive statements. That night, Rosalie and John, unable to tolerate the stink coming from Mrs. Janowski's sealed room any longer, decide to break down the door in the morning. After they go back to bed, Ethel murders them with a cleaver.

Detective McDonough returns to interview Ethel again, and although she gives contradictory information, the detective leaves without incident. Ethel proceeds to dismember her victims, stuff the pieces into sacks, and drive them out to a seaside area to dump them into the ocean. But too many witnesses are around, so she is forced to take the bags back home and drag them back into the house; on the way in she forgets to close her car's trunk. A suspicious neighbor peers into it, finds a severed hand, and calls the police. In the end, Detective McDonough walks in on Ethel eating one of her dead grandmother's arms.

== Cast ==
- Priscilla Alden as Ethel Janowski
- Michael Flood as John
- Jane Lambert as Mrs. Janowski, Ethel's Grandmother
- Robert Copple
- George Buck Flower as Detective Sergeant Earl McDonough
- Gina Martine as Mrs. Kendley
- Cliff McDonald as Dr. Gerard
- Charles Egan as Drunk Man
- Sonny La Rocca
- Sandra Shotwell as Nurse
- Lisa Farros as Rosalie Janowski

== Production ==
Filming started for five weeks in the spring of 1973 on location in San Francisco. Millard stated that before shooting, he made the decision that if he couldn't find a house that was "quite rundown, kind of spooky; the paint peeling off the wall, "he wouldn't have made the film because the house "had to be kind of eerie, a place you'd be frightened to be at night.".

== Release ==
The film was theatrically released on July 12, 1975, in the United States.

=== Home media ===
The film was released on DVD by E.I. Independent Cinema on September 13, 2005, as a part of a double-feature with Satan's Black Wedding. On July 30, 2024, Vinegar Syndrome released the same double-feature on Blu-ray, with newly commissioned bonus materials.

== Reception ==
Dennis Schwartz from Ozus' World Movie Reviews awarded the film a grade B−, calling it "an offbeat and obscure trashy comical horror thriller". Bill Gibron of DVD Talk gave a grade 4½ out of a possible 5 to the film, and wrote, "Oh Lord, you've GOT to love Criminally Insane. This unfettered freak show of a fright flick, starring the world's portliest serial killer (yes, even bigger than John Wayne Gacy and Leatherface, combined) is so downright depraved, so tantalizing in its turgid storytelling and squalid scenarios that words cannot begin to describe its baneful beauty" and "This is the type of movie the 70s are famous for, off the wall experiments in execution and excess. Imagine Kathy Bates blown up like a balloon and running around brandishing a butcher's knife and you start to get the idea of how stellar this fright flick really is. The terror is kept to a minimum, and the storyline is just an excuse to see Ethel eat and kill, but when it's as bloody and bold as this film, who really cares". Similarly, DVD Verdict's David Johnson wrote, "This flick is deserving of its title—it is absolutely crazy" and "This is just a fun, gruesome hour of weirdness".

Alternately, The Terror Trap rated the film two and a half out of five stars, stating that the film never really takes off in spite of treating its premise as a straight psychological horror film and Alden's interesting performance.

== See also ==
- List of American films of 1975
