= Small Talk (2016 film) =

- Theatrical release poster
- Traditional Chinese: 日常對話
- Hanyu Pinyin: Rì Cháng Duì Huà
- Directed by: Huang Hui-chen
- Produced by: Diana Chiawen Lee
- Cinematography: Che Lin
- Edited by: Jessica Lin
- Music by: Lim Giong; Point
- Production companies: Small Talk Productions; 3H Productions
- Distributed by: Mirror Stage Films
- Release dates: October 5, 2016 (Golden Horse); April 14, 2017 (Taiwan)
- Running time: 88 minutes
- Country: Taiwan
- Language: Taiwanese
- Box office: NT$4.1 million

Small Talk (Mandarin: 日常對話) is a 2016 Taiwanese documentary feature film in which the director Huang Hui-chen attempts to reveal and reconcile a painful past shared between herself and her mother A-nu, a lesbian Taoist priestess.

Small Talk had its world premiere at the 53rd Golden Horse Film Festival and Awards on October 5, 2016, and was nominated for Best Documentary and Best Editing. It had its international premiere at the 67th Berlin International Film Festival in February 2017 in the Panorama section, where it won the Teddy Award for Best Documentary film. Small Talk is the first Taiwanese documentary to be accepted as a Panorama selection.

It was selected as the Taiwanese entry for the Best Foreign Language Film at the 90th Academy Awards, but was not nominated.

Small Talk is executive produced by Hou Hsiao-hsien.

== Themes ==
The film is a meditative exploration into Huang and her mother A-nu's past, each layer revealing a little more about who A-nu is, as a Taoist priestess, a lover to many girlfriends, a dependable friend, and an absentee mother. It is the identify of a mother that Huang wants to understand, since A-nu has made it clear that she never wanted to get married nor have children.

Through sit-down interviews, often ending in silence, Huang attempts to break down the wall that stands between herself and her mother for the past 20 years. The film also incorporate interviews with A-nu's past and present lovers, A-nu's siblings, as well as home video shot over the course of the last 20 years to weave a tapestry of a daughter's vague understanding of her lesbian mom.

The ultimate reveal comes when Huang finally summons up the courage to have the talk with A-nu, which will either free Huang and A-nu from their shared painful past, or may further estrange them.

== Release ==
Small Talk was theatrically released in Taiwan on April 14, 2017 by Mirror Stage Films.

== Critical response ==
Small Talk world premiered at the 53rd Golden Horse Film Festival in Taiwan to critical acclaim, holding onto the number one spot for Audience Choice Award, beating out Edward Yang's A Brighter Summer Day for two consecutive weeks, before taking second place.

== Awards ==
On February 17, 2017, Small Talk was awarded the Teddy Award for Best Documentary Film at the Berlin International Film Festival.

The Teddy Award jurors stated:

Small Talk is the director's courageous portrayal of her family story, which gives an audience an inside look at a culture that we might not be familiar with. This powerful documentary manages to be of universal significance and extremely intimate at the same time.

Small Talk was also nominated for Best Documentary and Best Editing at the 53rd Golden Horse Awards.

In July 2017, the film won Best Documentary at the 19th Taipei Film Awards.

It was nominated for Best Film at the 17th Chinese Film Media Awards.

== See also ==
- List of submissions to the 90th Academy Awards for Best Foreign Language Film
- List of Taiwanese submissions for the Academy Award for Best Foreign Language Film
