= The Soul Guiding Array =

Parade formations in Taiwan

The Soul Guiding Array, also known as “khan-bông kua-tīn” in Taiwanese, is a form of parade formations unique in Taiwan, commonly performed during funeral ceremonies. It is prevalent in the regions south to the Zhuoshui River. The ensemble of Soul Guiding Array typically consists of five to seven members. The musicians and ritual masters are usually male, while the rest of the roles are portrayed by females. The performance happens around the incense pavilion, with the performers holding magical tools and engaging in recitation, singing, dancing, and various ritualistic acts like guiding souls, consoling the deceased, opening paths, and sending spirits peacefully to the afterlife. These performances reflect the prevailing folk beliefs in Taiwan, including “immortal souls,” “judgment after death,” and “karma and reincarnation.”

== Introduction ==
The Soul Guiding Array is a form of parade formations unique in Taiwan, commonly performed during funeral ceremonies. The performance involves a storyline of guiding the souls to the blissful afterlife, character portrayals, musical accompaniment, and performing techniques. The performance takes the format of “lo̍k-tē-sàu” (an informal performance that traditionally takes place at temple courts) and is observed by audience, usually the bereaved family. Possessing the archetypical characteristic of theatre, the Soul Guiding Array is thus classified as a form of song and dance drama in additional to its religious purposes.These performances reflect the prevailing folk beliefs in Taiwan, including “immortal souls,” “judgment after death,” and “karma and reincarnation."

== Origin ==
There are three main theories about the origins of the Soul Guiding Array. The first one suggests it originated from China; the second posits it evolved from storytelling, traditional opera, or folk performance to funeral rituals in local Taiwan. The third connects its roots to Taoist rituals. There are scholars that combined these theories and evidence to propose that the formation of Soul Guiding Array was the result of the fusion of folk beliefs, religious funeral practices, and partially the Fujian-originated “séance song.” Combined with the forms of storytelling, Taiwanese opera, and Che Ku music and Conducted through the religious ceremony of soul-redeeming, this amalgamation has become the funeral ritual known as the Soul Guiding Array.

== Popular regions and occasions ==
The practice of the Soul Guiding Array is predominant in areas south of the Choshui River, especially in the districts like Xiaying and Shanhua in Tainan City, making them the heartland of the Soul Guiding Array. While commonly performed at funerals, there were claims that the Soul Guiding Array could take place at temple fairs and on the wedding eves. However, due to the absence of such practices in modern wedding customs, the latter claim was not well accepted.

== Performance ==
A typical ensemble of the Soul Guiding Array comprises five to seven members. The terms for roles, responsibilities, and attire of members, however, are different among literature and the northern, central, and southern regions. The roles include a ritual master, an elderly woman, a medium (who walks backwards facing the ritual master), a young woman, and a musician. The singing, dancing, and performance of rituals are undertaken by the ritual master, the medium, the elderly woman, and the young woman, while the musician provides musical accompaniment. Apart from the musician and ritual master, who are male, the other three roles are portrayed by females.

The performers of the Soul Guiding Array are often hired by the daughters and sons of the deceased, and the performance includes singing, dancing, rituals, and acrobatics. Its main purpose is to guide the departed souls through the underworld to the Western Pure Land through the divine guidance.
