= Olives and Their Oil =

1914 film

Olives and Their Oil is a 1914 educational short film about the production of olive oil. The film was released by Keystone Studios on February 7, 1914, on a split reel with the Charlie Chaplin comedy Kid Auto Races at Venice.
