= Ingredients (film) =

Ingredients: The Local Food Movement Takes Root
- Directed by: Robert Bates
- Produced by: Brian Kimmel
- Narrated by: Bebe Neuwirth
- Cinematography: Brian Kimmel
- Production company: Optic Nerve Productions
- Release date: June 6, 2009
- Running time: 67 minutes
- Country: United States

Ingredients: The Local Food Movement Takes Root is a 2009 documentary film about the shortcomings of America's industrialized food system against a rising local food movement, whose proponents are shrinking the gap between farmland and dinner table. The film is directed by Robert Bates, produced by Brian Kimmel (The Kitchen Sessions with Charlie Trotter) and narrated by actress Bebe Neuwirth.

Chefs Alice Waters, Peter Hoffman, Kathy Whims, and Greg Higgins share their views as growers, restaurateurs, and consumers around the country, from Willamette Valley, Oregon to the urban food desert Harlem, New York, discuss their methods for bringing food production back home. Other participants from the Portland, Oregon area include Will Newman (Oregon Sustainable Agriculture Land Trust co-founder) and wife Susan Clark of Natural Harvest Farm, Ken Gordon of Kenny & Zuke's Delicatessen, and his wife permaculturist Leslee Lewis.

Ingredients posits that concentrated animal feeding operations (CAFOs) are causing worse and more frequent outbreaks of disease; the film also covers community-supported agriculture (CSA), biodynamic wine, and organic farming.

Ingredients was shown at the 2010 Cleveland International Film Festival (and features interviews with the Jones family of Chef's Garden farm in Huron, Ohio) and at the 2010 Farm Aid.

In 2011, the sequel Ingredients Hawaii was filmed in Hawaii and was released in 2012. The sequel focuses on Hawaii's unique solutions and challenges faced in growing and selling their food.
