= Criminally Insane 2 =

1987 film by Nick Millard

- VHS released by Video Treasures
- Directed by: Nick Millard
- Written by: Nick Millard
- Produced by: Frances Millard
- Starring: Priscilla Alden
- Production company: I.R.M.I. Films Corporation
- Distributed by: I.R.M.I. Films Corporation
- Release date: 1987 (United States)
- Running time: 60 minutes
- Country: United States
- Language: English

Criminally Insane 2 (also known as Crazy Fat Ethel II) is a 1987 horror film written and directed by Nick Millard. It is the sequel to the 1975 film Criminally Insane.

In the film, a female serial killer is released from an insane asylum due to budget cuts. She is transferred to a halfway house, where her delusions resurface. She kills an abusive orderly, and then goes on a killing spree.

This sequel was shot on video and is 50% clips from its predecessor (presented as flashbacks). The film contains roughly just 30 minutes of new content. The new content has no soundtrack (the only music in the film is during the reused flashback footage), and the video quality is markedly poor, a constant whirring of the machinery being audible.

== Plot ==
Due to budget cuts, an asylum for the criminally insane releases the infamous Ethel Janowski, a morbidly obese woman whose obsession with food caused her to murder six people 13 years earlier, into a halfway house operated by the elderly Hope Bartholomew. As soon as Ethel is admitted into the Bartholomew House, it becomes clear that she is still delusional, convinced that Hope is her dead grandmother, and that a fellow patient named Edgar Stanley is the detective who arrested her. As time passes, Ethel begins demanding more food and refusing to take her medication.

One day, while Hope is out, an orderly feeds the residents dog food, and taunts Ethel by slowly eating a chocolate bar in front of her. Ethel snaps, and kills the orderly by hanging him with a cord, an act witnessed by Edgar. A lieutenant is called in to investigate the death, and leaves after questioning Ethel. Edgar tells Ethel that he will keep quiet about what she did, in exchange for her desserts. Ethel tries to poison Edgar, and when that fails, she resorts to stabbing him with four knives.

After another visit from the lieutenant, Hope catches Ethel eating a bag of pretzels, and confiscates them. Ethel then kills Hope, then says "I guess I just lost hope," and laughs. Ethel proceeds to murder the remaining resident (a man who believed he was an insect) and one of the institution doctors when he drops by to see why his calls to the halfway house have not been getting through. Ethel then dances with a dog and a knife in the house's backyard. When the lieutenant returns, she answers the door, and laughs crazily as she states, "Welcome to Bartholomew House. I'm Hope Bartholomew, and I hope you'll be very happy here!"

== Cast ==
- Priscilla Alden as Ethel Janowsky
- Joe Elliot as Dinner Server
- Albert Eskinazi as Edgar Stanley
- Royal Farros as Doctor
- Frances Millard as Hope Bartholomew
- Nick Millard as Dr. Stevens
- Fred Sarra as Lieutenant Frank Harris

== Reception ==
Bill Gibron of DVD Talk awarded the film a score of 2/5, and wrote, "While there is some enjoyment to be had in revisiting a favorite fiend, Criminally Insane 2 is nothing more than a novelty. It can't hold a moldering corpse to its predecessor." A zero was given by Slasherpool, which called the film "suckalicious" and "embarrassingly awful". All DVD Verdict's David Johnson wrote in regards to Criminally Insane 2 was, "The less I say about this horrible movie the better."
