= Global Steak =

- Directed by: Anthony Orliange
- Country of origin: France
- Original language: French

Production
- Running time: 94 minutes

Original release
- Release: 15 December 2010

Global Steak: Demain nos enfants mangeront des criquets (lit. 'Global Steak: Tomorrow your children will eat locusts') is a 2010 French documentary television film directed by Anthony Orliange.

== Synopsis ==
The film explores the problem of meat consumption by humans and suggests that the increasing demand of meat in the world could lead to a catastrophe.

=== Entomophagy section ===
- Entomologist Séverin Tchibozo suggests the larvae of the rhinoceros beetle contain much protein (40%), more than chicken (20%) and beef (approximately 18%) and that larvae could become a protein source for a large [human] population.
- Professor Arnold van Huis at Wageningen University in Netherlands says that locust can produce 1 kg protein from 2 kg fodder compared to a cow needing 10 kg fodder to produce the same amount protein. Other benefits are that locust does not produce greenhouse gases and does not need antibiotics.
- Marian Peters of Bugs Organic Food talks of people's attitudes towards eating insects and suggests separating mealworms from their exoskeleton and repackaging them in the same manner as Surimi.

== Reception ==
Isabelle Hanne of Libération wrote that the film's subtitle gives the impression of alarmism, but that it is "by no means an anti-meat pamphlet", instead drawing its substance from contrasting industrial and ecological farming and covering "somewhat unexpected scientific experiments". La Libre Belgique's Hubert Heyrendt wrote that the film "forces us to rethink our consumption and production methods", and described it as an "exciting journey" which has room for optimism and "fortunately" does not try to "convert the viewer to vegetarianism, rather to encourage him to reflect on his current practices".
