= Wine for the Confused =

2004 American television documentary film

- Written by: John Cleese; David Kennard
- Directed by: David Kennard
- Starring: John Cleese; Alyce Cleese; Brendan Fraser
- Music by: Marc Capelle; Monte Vallier
- Country of origin: United States
- Original language: English

Production
- Producer: Victoria Simpson
- Cinematography: Victoria Simpson
- Editor: Victoria Simpson
- Running time: 92 minutes

Original release
- Release: October 21, 2004

Wine for the Confused is a documentary hosted by John Cleese. It is a light-hearted introduction to wine for novices. Cleese guides viewers through the basics of wine types and grape varieties, wine making, wine tasting and terminology, buying and storing wines, through direct narrative and interviews with wine makers and wine sellers.

Traveling through California wine country, Cleese meets experts who explain different wine varieties, the fermentation process and how growing location affects the outcome of wine. Cleese also hosts a tasting party, where he tests the palates of Brendan Fraser and other guests to determine the difference between expensive and inexpensive brands.

The film duration is 92 minutes and concludes with a large group conducting a blind wine tasting. One of the tasting results was that most tasters could not distinguish between red wine and white wine. Another was that most tasters rated an inexpensive wine equal in taste to an expensive prestige wine, and both of these out scored the rest of the mid-priced and high-priced wines in the blind test.
