= Barolo Boys =

- Film poster
- Directed by: Paolo Casalis and Tiziano Gaia
- Written by: Paolo Casalis and Tiziano Gaia
- Produced by: Stuffilm Creativeye
- Starring: Elio Altare, Giorgio Rivetti, Marco de Grazia, Chiara Boschis, Joe Bastianich, Carlo Petrini, Oscar Farinetti
- Distributed by: Produzioni Fuorifuoco
- Release date: September 30, 2014
- Running time: 64 minutes
- Country: Italy
- Languages: Italian, English

Barolo Boys. The Story of a Revolution (Italian: Barolo Boys. Storia di una Rivoluzione) is a 2014 documentary film about the story of a group of young winemakers (after called the Barolo Boys) who in the 1980s and '90s dramatically changed the world of Barolo wine, in the Langhe, north-western Italy. In December 2014 documentary won the DOC Wine Travel Food Prize 2014, for the best film on wine and food themes.

The film depicts the last thirty years of technical innovations and changes in the story of Barolo, a red wine produced from Nebbiolo grapes, almost unknown until the 1970s (apart from its land of origin, an area of 11 communes in the Langhe) and now considered one of the best red wines in the world. This is partly due to the work and innovations of the Barolo Boys, or Modernists, who introduced a series of technical innovations in the world of Italian wine.

The film focuses on these innovations, and the contrasts that derived from these changes, but also depicts the friendship and spirit of the group behind these producers and their success. The documentary is filmed in the Langhe landscape, which has recently become Unesco World Heritage Site.

== Film festivals ==
- Winner of DOC Wine Travel Food Prize 2014
- Official Selection Vancouver Film Festival 2015
- Official Selection Wine Country Film Festival 2014
- Official Selection Overlook Festival, Rome
- Official Selection Kinookus Festival, Croatia
- Official Selection Corto e Fieno Festival
