= That Should Not Be: Our Children Will Accuse Us =

- French: Nos enfants nous accuseront
- Directed by: Jean-Paul Jaud
- Starring: Perico Légasse
- Music by: Gabriel Yared
- Release dates: 15 October 2008 (Montréal International Festival of New Cinema and New Media))
- Running time: 112 minutes
- Country: France
- Languages: French, English

That Should Not Be: Our Children Will Accuse Us (Original title: Nos enfants nous accuseront, US title: Food Beware: The French Organic Revolution) is a 2008 French documentary film directed by Jean-Paul Jaud.

The documentary is about food poisoning by toxins from agricultural chemicals such as pesticides, herbicides, fertilizers, etc.

== Synopsis ==
The film tells the story of an initiative in Barjac, a commune located in the Gard department in southern France, that decided to introduce organic produce into the town's school cafeteria.
