= The God of Ramen =

- Directed by: Takashi Innami
- Based on: The Fuji TV Three part series "Non Fiction"
- Produced by: Kazuya Ajitani
- Starring: Hiromitsu Iwaida: Shōsuke Tanihara; Kazuo Yamagishi
- Music by: Joe Hisaishi
- Production company: Media Research
- Distributed by: Pony Canon
- Release dates: June 20, 2013 (premiere, Tokyo)
- Running time: 90 minutes
- Country: Japan
- Language: Japanese

The God of Ramen (ラーメンより大切なもの ~東池袋大勝軒 50年の秘密~, Rāmen yori Taisetsu na Mono: Higashi Ikebukuro Taishōken 50-nen no Himitsu) is a 2013 documentary from Japan, on noted ramen chef Kazuo Yamagishi.

The documentary is directed by Takashi Innami and by narrated by Shōsuke Tanihara, and follows 13 years in the life of Yamagishi, examining his long career, and covering his health and business challenges in his later life, as well as the impact his work has had on ramen in Japan.

The documentary revealed some of the truths that Yamagishi had kept for years, and the heavy physical and emotional burden that he carried, in his ongoing career as a ramen chef. It addresses what drives him to continue making ramen, despite the serious series of debilitating medical issues that slowly erode his ability to work as a chef.

The film was chosen for a number of international film festivals.

== Production ==
The film initially came out of a three-part series broadcast on Fuji TV on Yamagishi, in 2012. Fuji TV's “The Nonfiction” three-episode documentary was well received in Japan, and won the Silver Screen Award at the US International Film & Video Festival. It covered similar topics and challenges of the famed ramen chef. The documentary began filming in 2000, and revisited Yamagishi every couple of years, following up on his life and the challenges to his business.

His apprentices are often interviewed as part of the show. While generally cooperative, Yamagishi did deny access to some areas of the shop for filming, for sentimental reasons, which are then later revealed in the demolition of the shop.

The documentary was directed by Takashi Innami and written by Hiromitsu Iwaida. Duration is 97 minutes.

== Soundtrack ==
Famed composer Joe Hisaishi created the theme music for the documentary, based on what he saw were the strengths and themes of Yamagishi, and his lifelong contributions to ramen in Japan. Additional music for the documentary was created by Kôji Takata, and complemented Hisashi's contribution.

== Synopsis ==
The documentary begins in 2001, showing the long lines outside Kazuo Yamagishi's ramen restaurant, “Taishoken” (formally “East Ikebukuro Taishoken”). The restaurant is extremely busy, and interviews with people in the long queue indicate their passion for Yamagishi's ramen. Some people have been waiting for two hours. Inside the shop, there are just 16 seats and the narrator notes that they are never empty.

Yamagishi was born 1934 in Nagano Prefecture. He decided to dedicate his life to making ramen at the age of 17, and moved to Tokyo from Yamanouchi Town in the Shiga Highlands with his wife, who was also his cousin, whom he had known since he was 3. They opened the restaurant in 1961.

In 1995, Yamagishi created a special dish called “morisoba” (mountain of noodles), which is considered the origin of the now hugely popular “tsukemen” or dipping noodles.

Yamagishi trains multiple apprentices, who come from all walks of life and stay for various time periods. He is obviously generous with his time, and although the apprentices are there, Yamagishi himself does most of the work because of space restrictions in the kitchen. He is well respected by his apprentices for this, and his customers, some of whom have been coming to his shop for decades, and the apprentices note without exception, the main reason people flock to Taishoken is Yamagishi to whom they endearingly refer as “the boss.”

As the documentary progresses, it is clear he has had locked up memories of his wife, who died aged only 52, and his main purpose now is to continue making ramen.

One day, the ramen shop is unusually closed. Yamagishi has gone to the hospital. The surgeon tells him that he has osteoarthritis in his hands and knees; there is little cartilage between the joints and the bones are rubbing together. The doctor advises him to make lifestyle changes, stop working and have an operation, otherwise his condition will worsen to the point where he won't be able to stand or walk. To complicate matters, Yamagishi is overweight.

The narrator returns to the shop some months later to find that Yamagishi has ignored his doctor's advice and continued working at the shop at his normal pace. The narrator notes a hidden back room, covered by bags, and raises this with Yamagishi. He at first avoids the topic, then reveals it was the bedroom he shared with his wife. He tells them that he doesn't want it on camera, and will stop the documentary if they persist, or go upstairs which also is private. Yamagishi has an apartment nearby, but instead sleeps in the restaurant.

The documentary makes a return to Yamagishi after some time and finds that his health is worse. He has put on more weight, and he has varicose veins so his legs have swollen, he is finding it hard to walk, and is not in the shop as much. He is also finding it hard to breathe. He collapses and is taken to hospital, where he has surgery. Yamagishi is not keen on the surgery, but has it so he can return to doing the one thing he wants to do, make ramen.

While Yamagishi is in hospital, Taishoken takes a downturn. The apprentices are now running the shop, which they find difficult, and he has not left a natural successor. It is evident Taishoken is all about Yamagishi, and with him absent, the customers disappear and it starts to lose money.

After six months, Yamagishi is now out of hospital, lost weight and able to stand and work. He triumphantly returns to work, and gets back to what he loves doing, making ramen. However, while he can now stand, he has pains in his fingers. The film crew returns to find he is not at work the next day, and after some time, he still hasn't returned to work. Visiting him at his house, he admits he can't make ramen because of the pain in his fingers.

The documentary shows the success of some of his apprentices after they have finished working with him. Many of them are now successful ramen chefs with their own businesses. One in particular has a chain of 15 ramen shops, which is hugely successful. He noted his success all comes down to his training with Yamagishi. Many of them use the connection to Taishoken and him in their advertising, using the “Taishoken” name, but because Yamagishi hasn't copyrighted the name, and has no franchise, there are no restrictions and he doesn't benefit financially.

Eventually, Taishoken is sold and demolished to make way for new apartments. An apartment in the new complex is purchased for him by the most successful apprentice. Other apprentices regularly visit him with their children, and Yamagishi is evidently content with his life and what he has achieved. The documentary finishes with a montage of the now many “Taishoken” shops in existence, including the successor to his own, a new larger shop in East Ikebukuro. In it, in pride of place, is a picture of cats he had bought for his wife, which had been in the original shop for 52 years.

== Cast ==
- Shōsuke Tanihara - Narrator
- Kazuo Yamagishi - as himself

== Production staff ==
- Kazuya Ajitani - Executive Producer
- Akira Nishimura - Producer
- Toshihiro Yamada - Producer

== Festivals/awards ==
Shown at:

- The International Japanese Film Festival 2022
- The Powell Street Film Festival
- Hawaii International Film Festival - 2013
- Eiga Sai - 9th Festival of Japanese Film and Culture 2016
