= Krazy Kat & Ignatz Mouse Discuss the Letter 'G' =

- Directed by: Gregory La Cava
- Produced by: William Randolph Hearst
- Animation by: Frank Moser; Leon Searl
- Color process: Black and white
- Production company: International Film Service
- Distributed by: Hearst-Vitagraph News Pictorial
- Release date: February 25, 1916
- Running time: 1:53
- Language: English

Krazy Kat & Ignatz Mouse Discuss the Letter 'G' is a 1916 silent short animated film featuring the comic strip character Krazy Kat. As with other animated shorts at the time, it was featured as an extra along with news reports that were released on film.

== Plot ==
The short film

Krazy is a chef who works in a bistro. His customer is none other than Ignatz. Ignatz orders slices of roast duck with some gravy. Krazy serves the order and even includes a whole pizza as a bonus. He then talks to the mouse about the way a lot of well-known people wear names beginning with 'G'.

Ignatz, however, does not believe in the trend and therefore asks the cat to name a few individuals who share it. Krazy gives "G. Washington" as an example, although the others such as "G. Rusalem" (Jerusalem) and "G. Hosafat" (Jehoshaphat) sound more like puns. Krazy then offers Ignatz one more bonus in a large strawberry pie, and angrily declares "G. Whiz!" (Gee whiz) in response to Krazy's "examples". Ignatz finds the subject rather ludicrous as the cynical mouse splats the pie on the cat. Though flat on his front and covered in jam, Krazy is pretty quiet on the matter, simply saying: "And him too", as he does not understand Ignatz's sarcasm.

== See also ==
- Krazy Kat filmography
