= Bosko's Soda Fountain =

1931 film

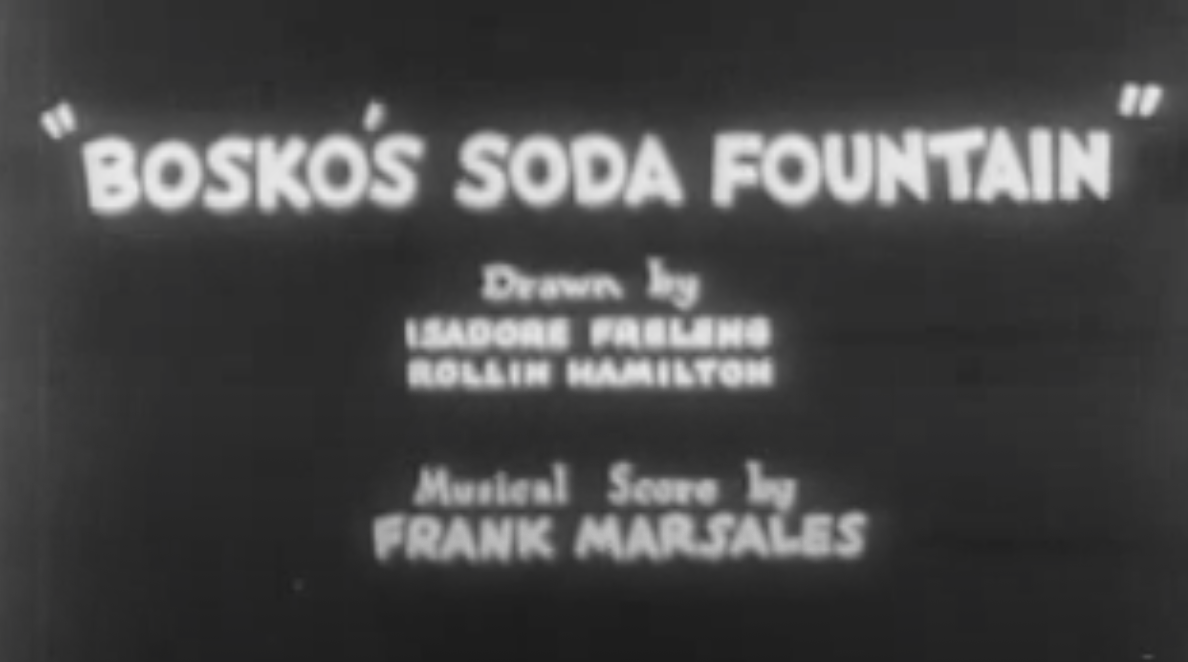
- Title card
- Directed by: Hugh Harman
- Produced by: Hugh Harman; Rudolf Ising; Leon Schlesinger
- Music by: Frank Marsales
- Animation by: Isadore Freleng; Rollin Hamilton
- Production companies: Harman-Ising Productions; Leon Schlesinger Productions
- Distributed by: Warner Bros. Pictures; The Vitaphone Corporation
- Release date: October 10, 1931; (earliest known date)
- Running time: 6:59
- Country: United States
- Language: English

Bosko's Soda Fountain is a 1931 American animated comedy short film. It is the fifteenth film in the Looney Tunes series featuring Bosko. It was released as early as October 10, 1931. (Note: Archived from an October 13 article, this is based on the fact that new cartoon shorts would premiere in theaters on Saturdays.) It was directed by Hugh Harman. The film score was composed by Frank Marsales.

This cartoon marks the first appearance of Honey's cat-like son, Wilber.

== Plot ==
Full short

Bosko the soda jerk serves an ice cream float to a mouse who resembles and acts like Mickey Mouse. Bosko's old teacher, a female hippo, arrives, who Bosko is happy to see and serve. As Bosko's attempt to mix an ice cream float fails, the mouse mocks him, causing him to use the mouse as a mixer instead. Before the hippo could enjoy the float, her foolish decision to turn on the fan causes it to fall apart and land on her face, as she leaves furiously and unaware of her stupidity. Bosko mocks her and continues to work.

An old dachshund steals hot dogs, only to be caught by Bosko, who plays him like an accordion as punishment. While the dachshund willingly does so to avoid prosecution, Honey is teaching Wilber the cat how to play the piano and sing. He is reluctant to do so and wants to eat ice cream instead. Honey calls Bosko to deliver an ice cream cone, which he struggles to balance due to the path being poorly maintained. He arrives, only for Wilber to throw the ice cream at his face and return to his room. A chase sequence occurs where Bosko is repeatedly sabotaged by Wilber's tricks and ends up falling into a barrel of water.
