= Beer Wars =

- Film poster
- Directed by: Anat Baron
- Produced by: Anat Baron
- Starring: Anat Baron; Sam Calagione; Rhonda Kallman
- Cinematography: Sandra Chandler
- Edited by: Douglas Blush
- Production company: Ducks In A Row Entertainment Corporation
- Distributed by: Gravitas Ventures
- Release date: April 16, 2009
- Running time: 89 minutes
- Country: United States
- Language: English

Beer Wars is a 2009 documentary film about the American beer industry. In particular, it covers the differences between large corporate breweries, namely Anheuser-Busch, the Miller Brewing Company, and the Coors Brewing Company opposed to smaller breweries like Dogfish Head Brewery, Moonshot 69, Yuengling, Stone Brewing Co., and other producers of craft beer. Also covered is how advertising and lobbyists are used to control the beer market, implying that these things harm competition and consumer choice.

Throughout the film, there is a theme that the smallest breweries have next to no chance to compete due to the sheer volume of advertising and outdated beer distribution laws. The original laws demanded a three-tier system to separate the powers of selling beer. The law demands that the beer brewer cannot deliver directly to the retailer, supposedly creating a separation of powers resembling the US government's legislative, judicial, and executive branches. The film claims these laws are now inhibiting growth of smaller brewers and therefore allowing the largest brewers (Coors, Anheuser-Busch, and Miller) to maintain an oligopoly on beer.

The film was written, produced, narrated, and directed by Anat Baron, former head of Mike's Hard Lemonade.

== See also ==
- American Beer (documentary)
