= Tsukemen =

Japanese noodle dish

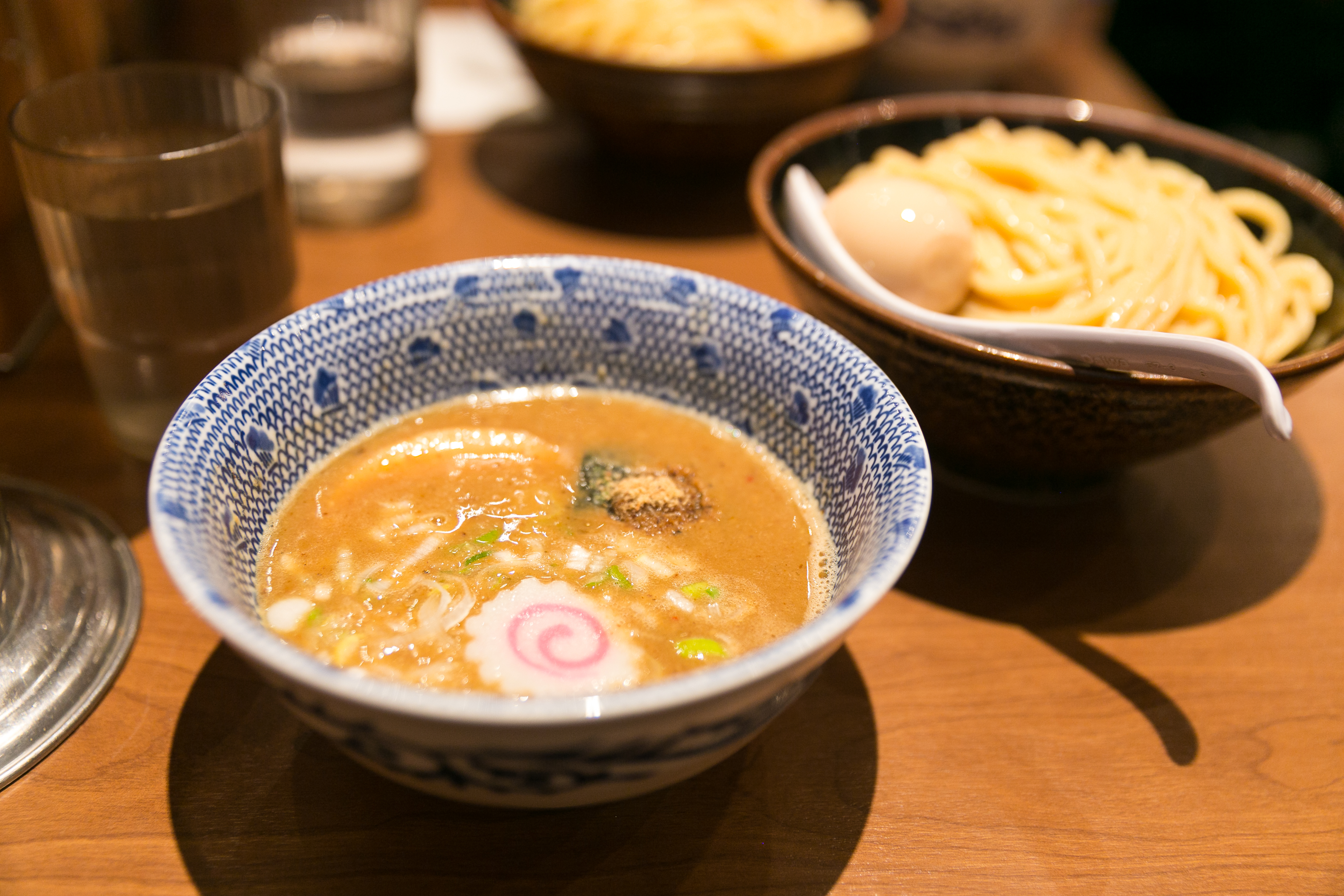
- Tsukemen at a Tokyo restaurant
- Alternative names: Dipping ramen
- Type: Noodle soup
- Place of origin: Japan
- Region or state: Tokyo
- Created by: Kazuo Yamagishi
- Invented: 1961
- Main ingredients: Cold ramen noodles, broth

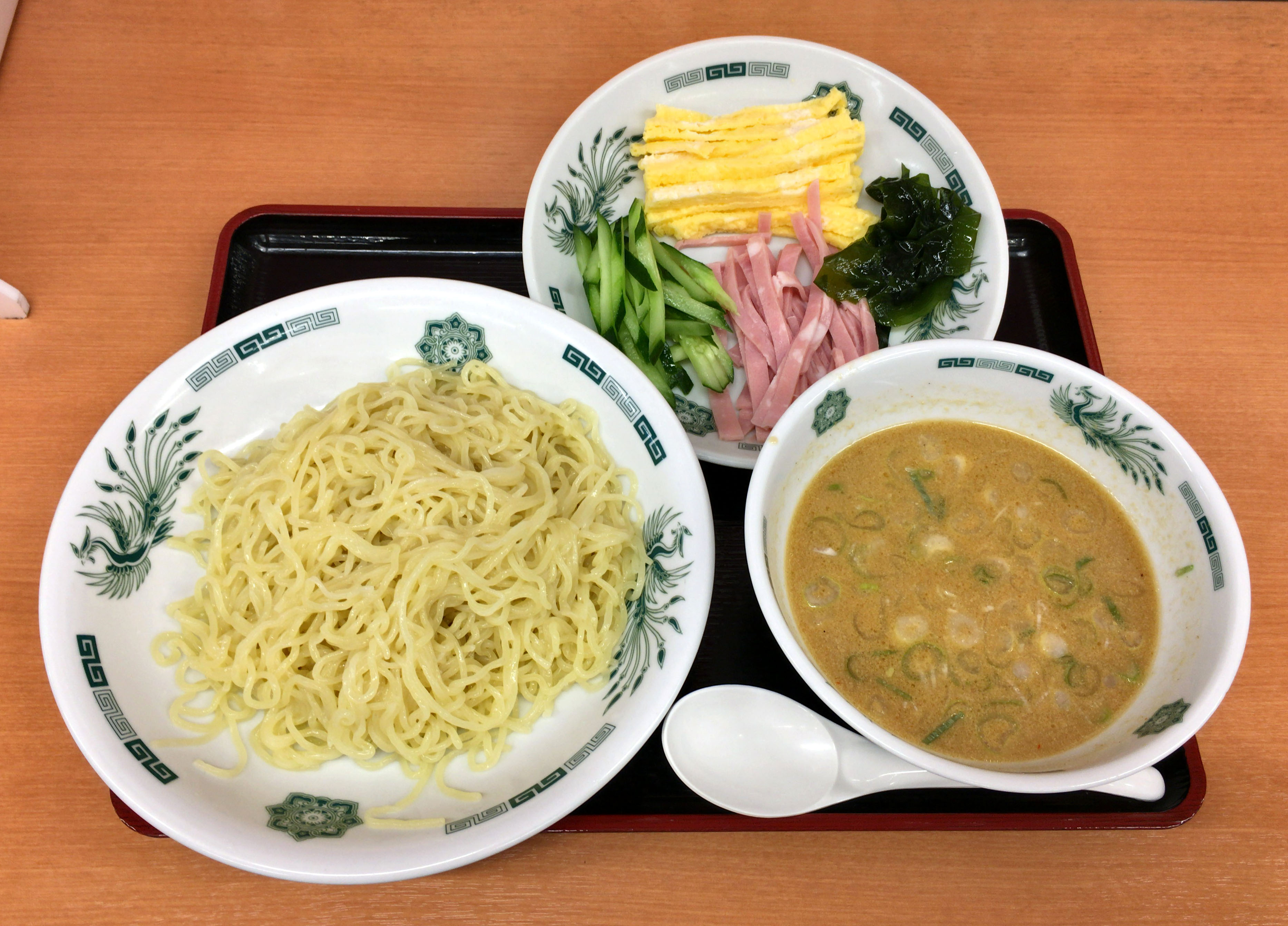
Hiyashi chūka Tsukemen

Tsukemen (Japanese: つけ麺, English: "dipping noodles") is a ramen dish in Japanese cuisine consisting of noodles that are eaten after being dipped in a separate bowl of soup or broth. The dish was invented in 1961 by Kazuo Yamagishi, a restaurateur in Tokyo, Japan. Since then, the dish has become popular throughout Japan, as well as overseas in the United States.

Tsukemen is a Japanese noodle ramen dish in Japanese cuisine consisting of separate servings of noodles and soup or broth, whereby the noodles are dipped in the soup. Soba and udon are some types of noodles used in the dish. The noodles are typically served cold, while the soup is typically served hot, which serves to season and moisten the noodles. The noodles can also be served at room temperature. Additional ingredients used in the dish are typically served atop or on the side within the dish of noodles. Some additional ingredients used include nori, chashu, menma, tamagoyaki and boiled eggs.

The soup serves as a dipping sauce, and is typically much stronger and intense in flavor compared to standard ramen broth. Dashi, a soup in Japanese cuisine, can be used, which is prepared using a soup base or stock that is also named "dashi." Some restaurants add hot water to dilute the soup at the conclusion of the meal, decreasing its strength and making it more palatable as a soup to finish the meal.

== History ==
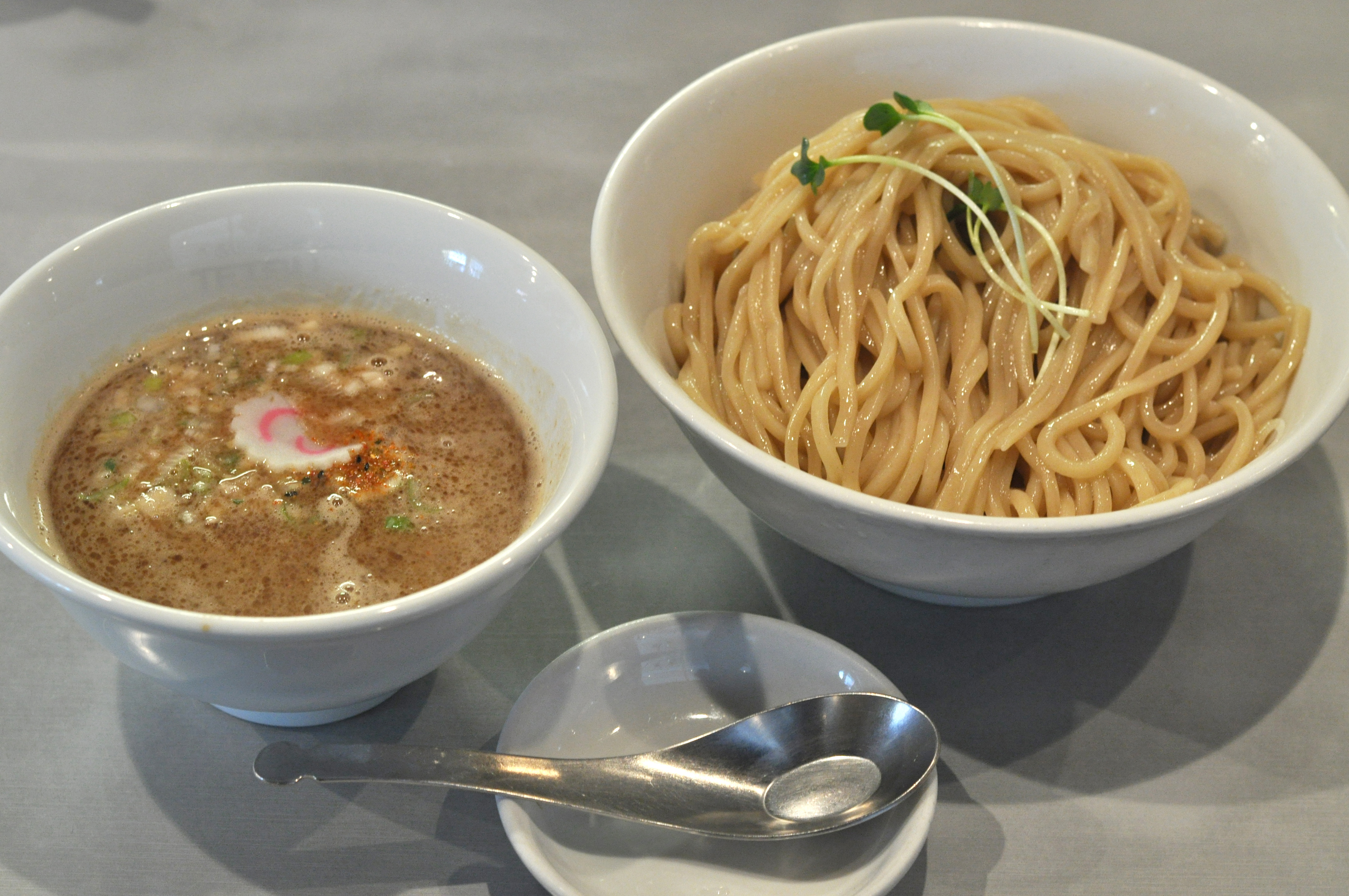
Tsukemen in Japan

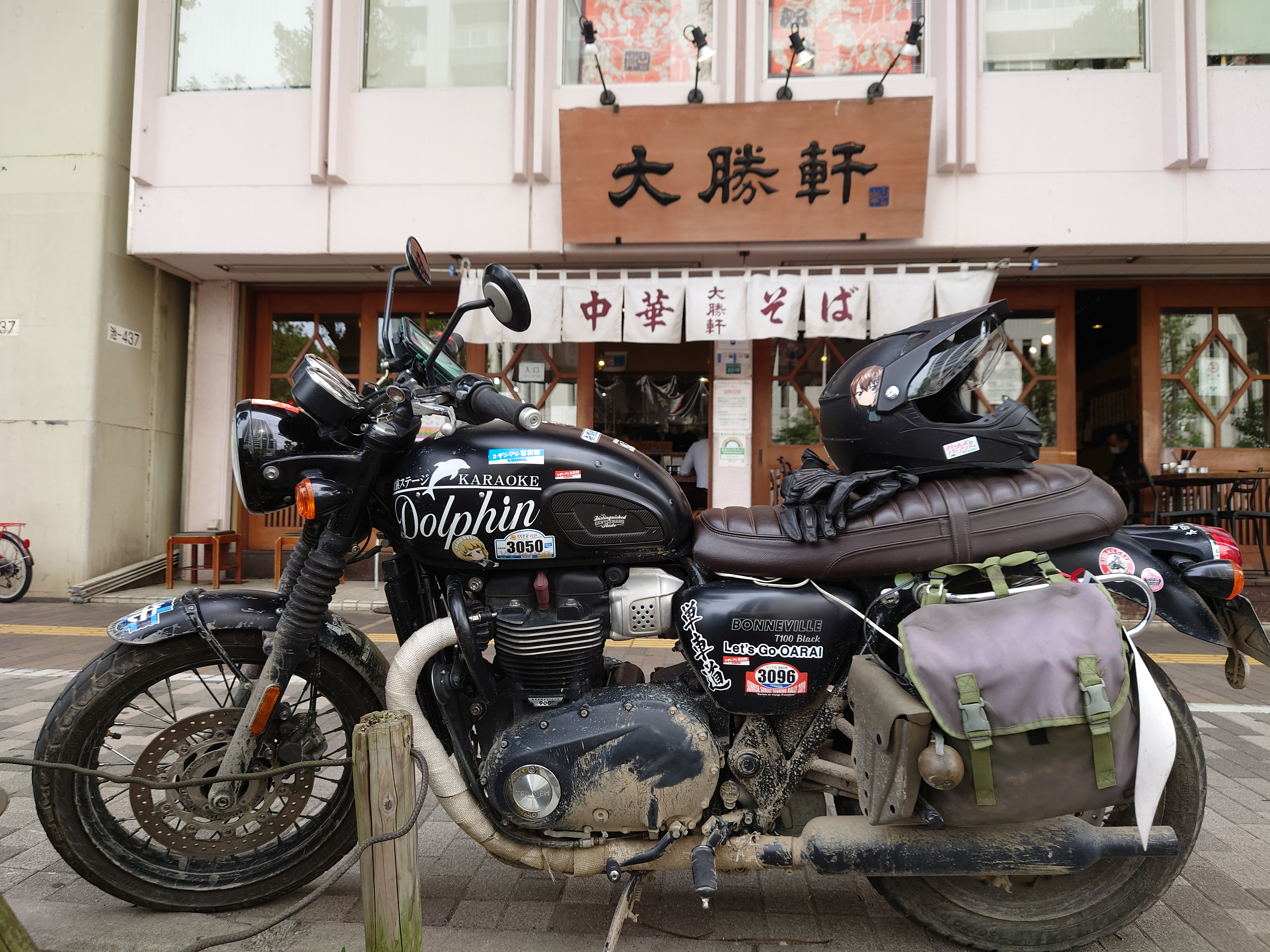
Taishoken Higashiikebukuro where Kazuo Yamagishi worked until the end

Tsukemen was invented in 1961 by Kazuo Yamagishi (1935–2015), who owned Taishoken restaurant, a well-known ramen restaurant in Tokyo, Japan. In 1961, Yamagishi added the dish to his restaurant's fare using the name "special morisoba", which consisted of "cold soba noodles with soup for dipping." At the time, it was priced at 40 yen, and the dish soon became very popular at Taishoken restaurants. As of 2015, over 100 Taishoken restaurants exist in Japan.

In recent years (circa 2000–present), tsukemen has become a very popular dish in Tokyo and throughout Japan, and several restaurants now exist in the country that purvey it exclusively.

Tsukemen is also served in restaurants in the United States and in other countries. In recent years (circa 2013–present), Tsukemen has become a popular dish in some ramen shops in Los Angeles. Conversely, in other areas of the U.S., such as Chicago (which has a thriving, highly regarded ramen scene as of 2026), the dish is uncommon and rarely served in restaurants.

== Gallery ==
Various tsukemen preparations

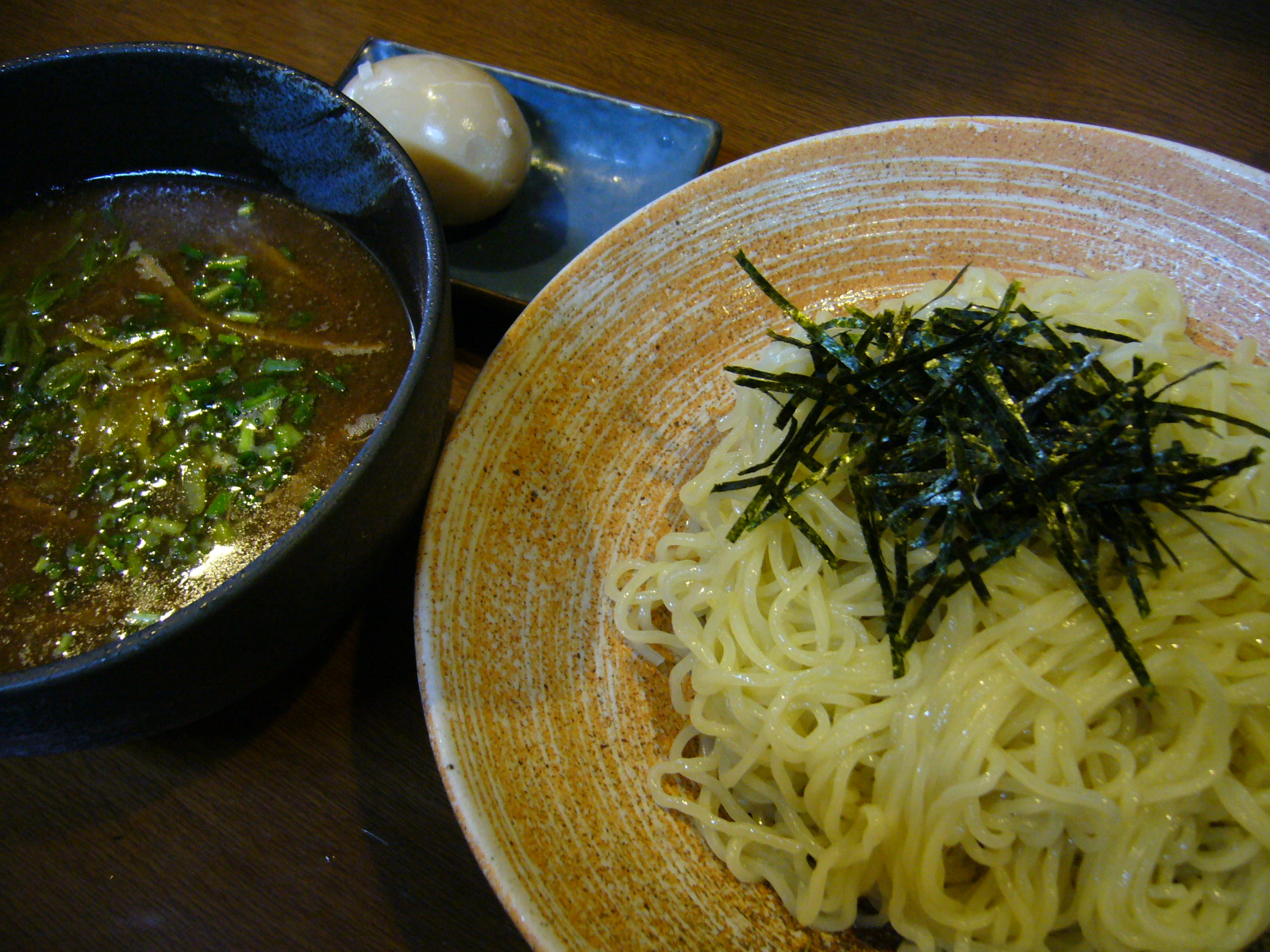
Tsukemen with nori-topped noodles

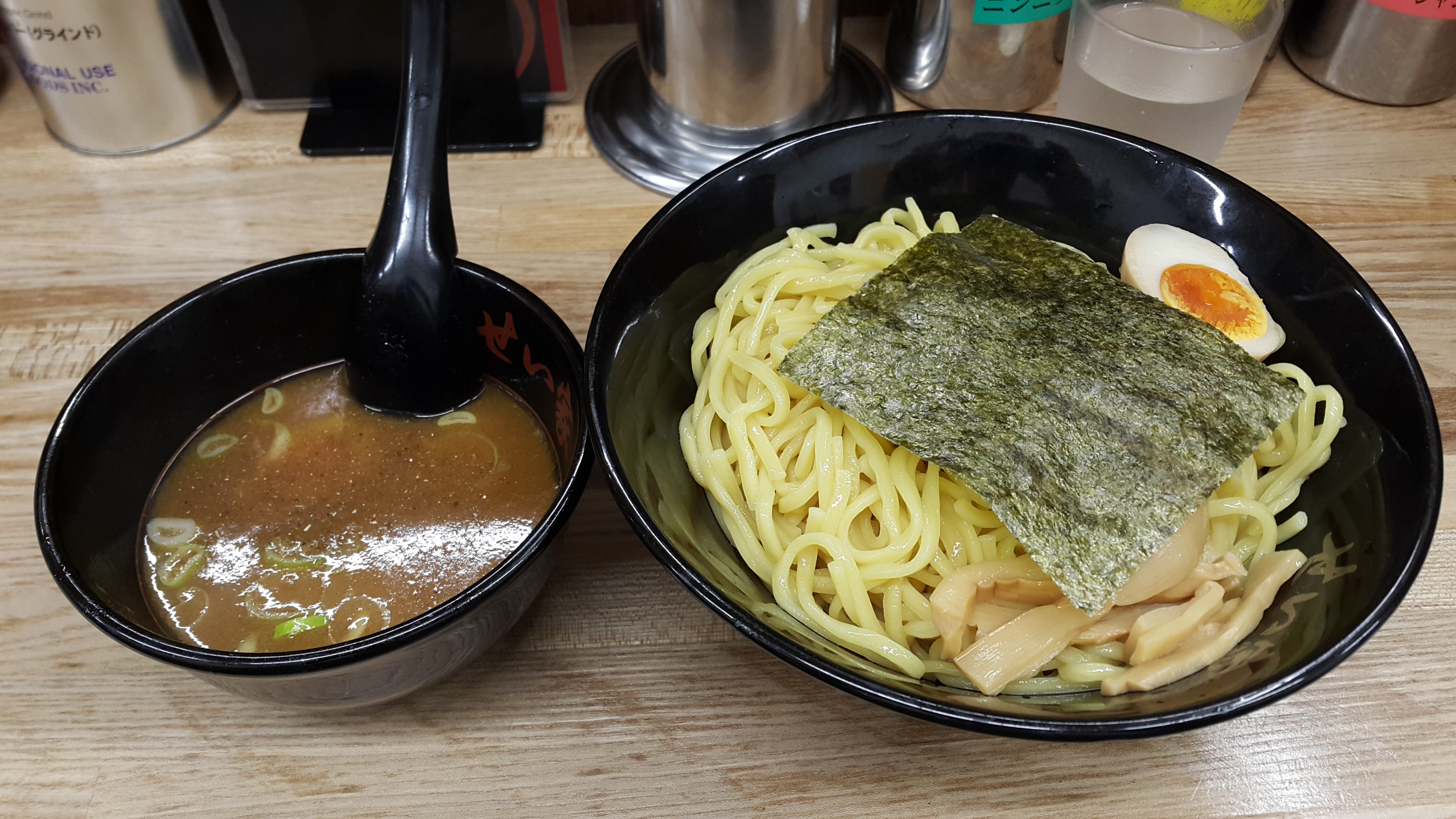
Tsukemen with a sheet of nori atop the noodles

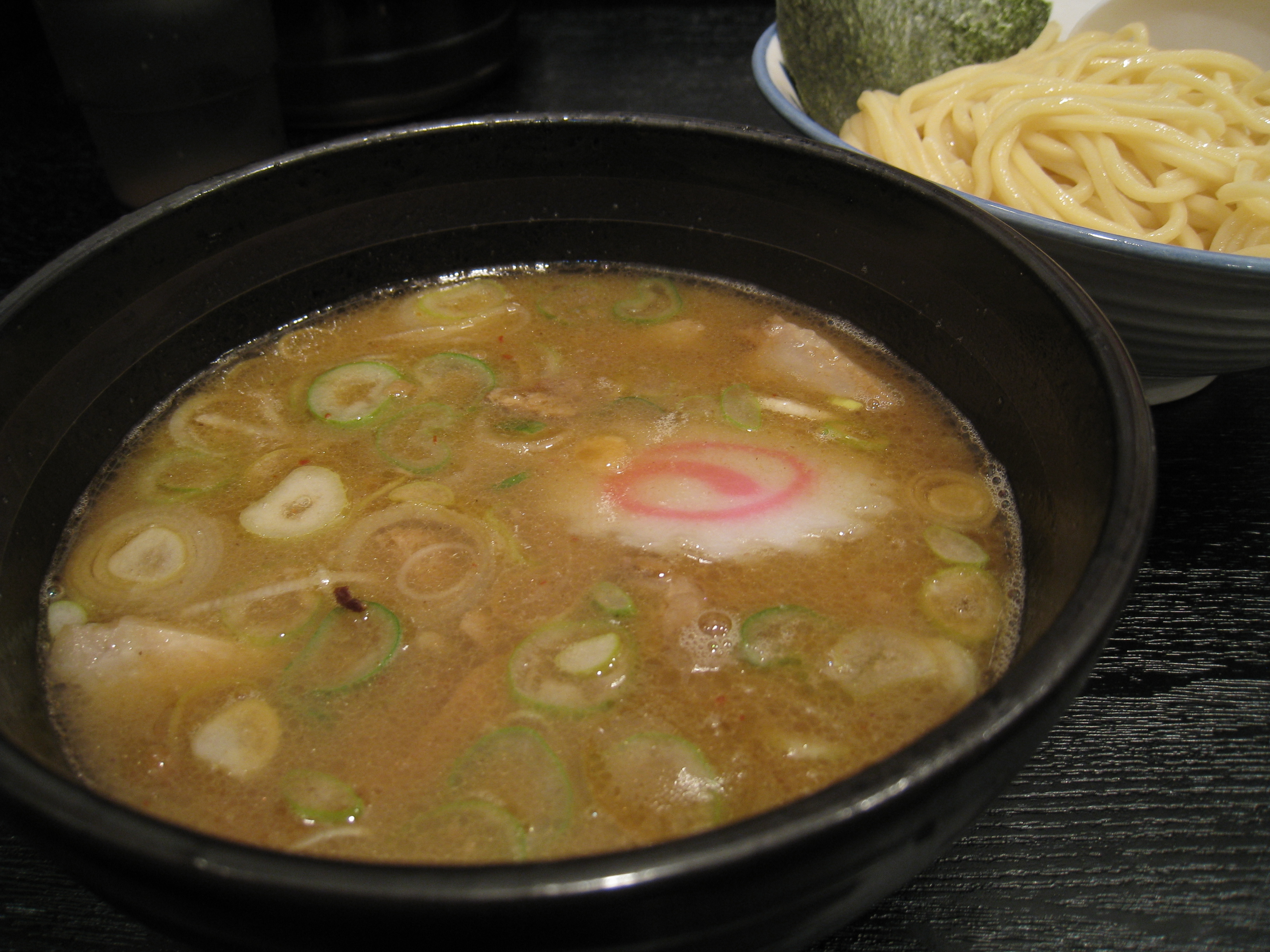
Close-up view of a soup for tsukemen

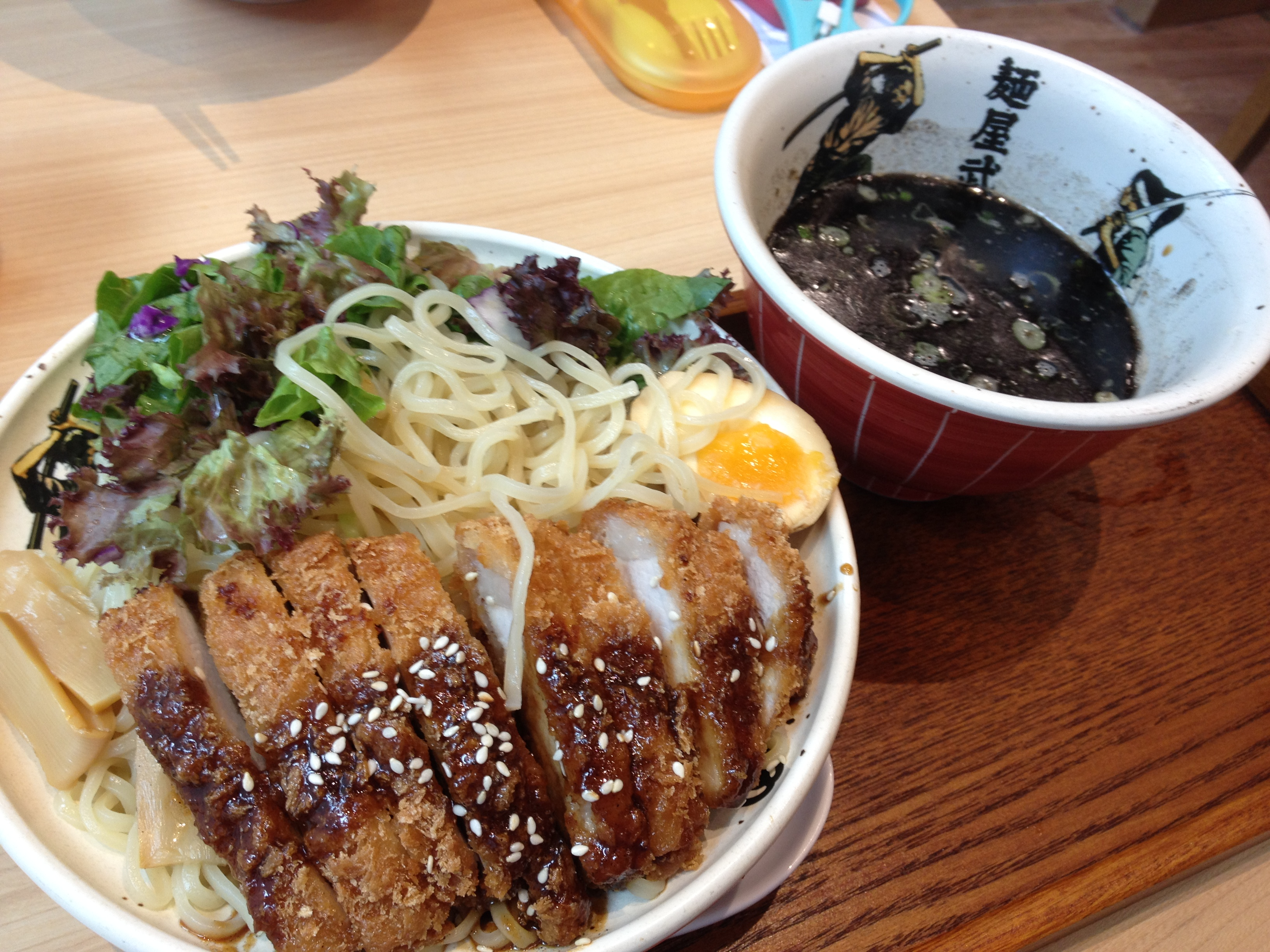
Tsukemen topped with fried pork cutlet, half of a soft-boiled egg and greens, in Singapore

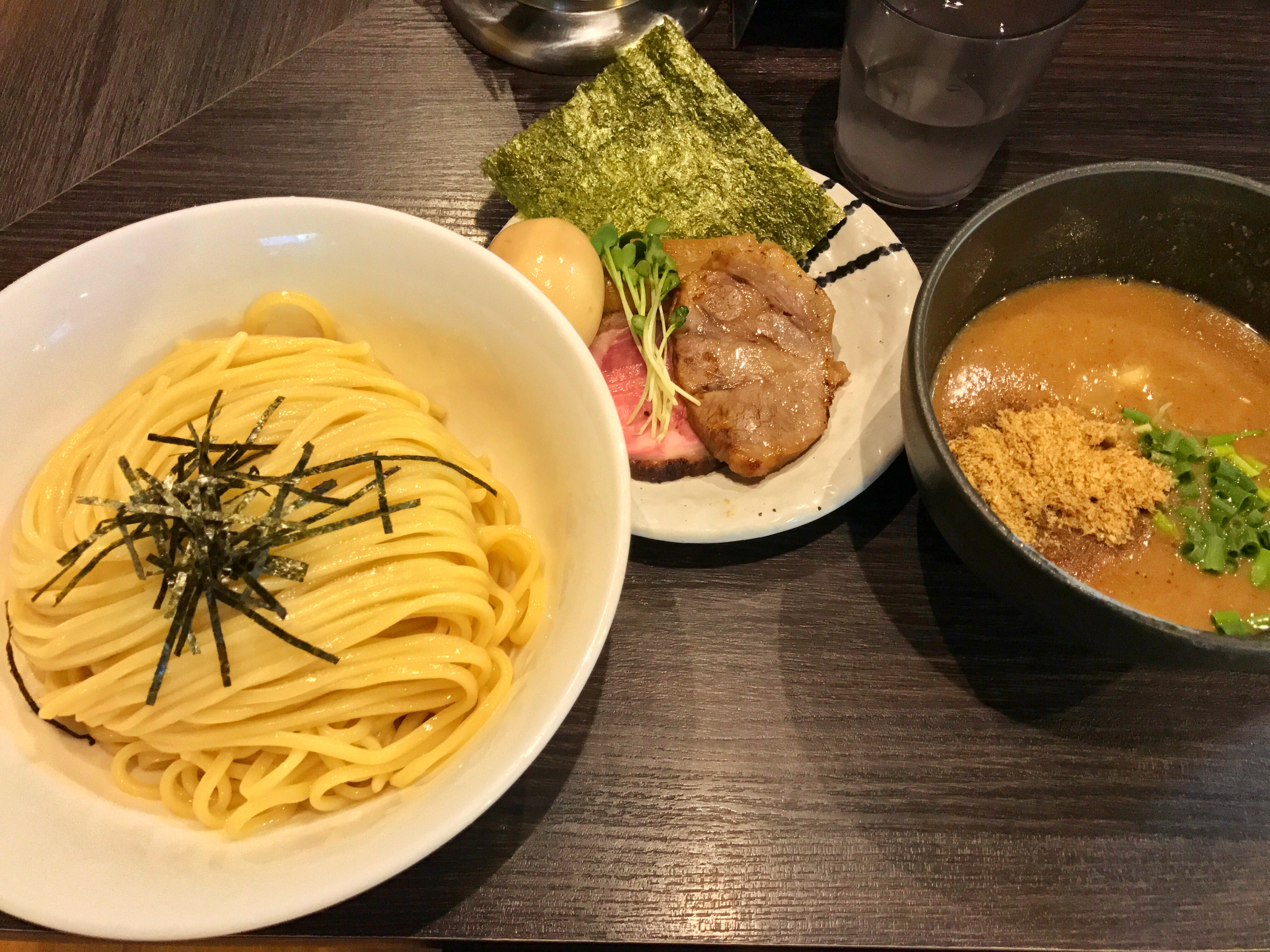
Tsukemen with additional foods on the side

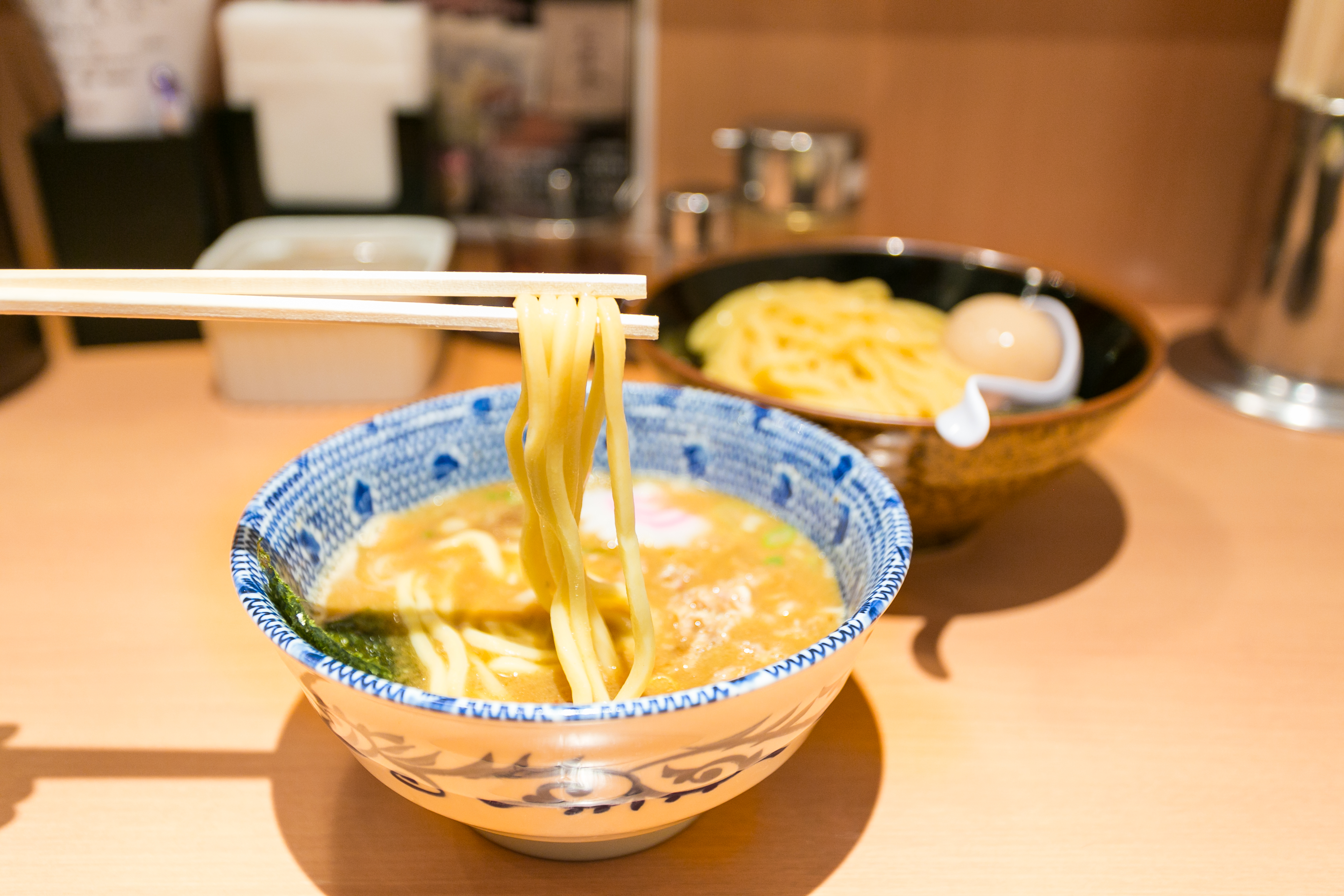
Tsukemen noodles being dipped

== See also ==
- List of Japanese soups and stews
- List of noodle dishes
- List of ramen dishes
