= The Birth of Saké =

- Directed by: Erik Shirai
- Produced by: Masako Tsumura
- Music by: Ken Kaizu
- Release date: April 16, 2015 (Tribeca)
- Running time: 94 min
- Country: United States
- Language: English

The Birth of Saké is a 2015 documentary film about the Tedorigawa Brewery, a then-144-year old sake brewery in Ishikawa Prefecture founded in 1870. The Birth of Saké documents the painstaking process of traditional, craft saké brewing that lasts throughout the winter.

Directed by Erik Shirai, a cinematographer for No Reservations, the film premiered at the Tribeca Film Festival, and also went on to win Best Documentary at the Bend Film Festival, Palm Springs International Film Festival, and the Ashland Film Festival.

A shortened 83 minute version of the film was broadcast September 5, 2016 on PBS POV (TV series) as Episode 6 of Season 29.
