= Pelosi (surname) =

Pelosi (Italian: [peˈlo.zi]) is an Italian surname meaning 'hairy' (masculine plural).

As a surname, Pelosi may refer to the following people:

- Alexandra Pelosi (born 1970), American journalist, documentary filmmaker, writer, and daughter of Nancy Pelosi
- Christine Pelosi (born 1966), American political strategist and daughter of Nancy Pelosi
- Claudio Pelosi (born 1966), Italian football striker
- Daniel Pelosi (born 1963), American convicted murderer
- John Pelosi (born 1956), Scottish football right winger
- Marc Pelosi (born 1994), American soccer midfielder
- Nancy Pelosi (born 1940), the 52nd speaker of the United States House of Representatives
- Paul Pelosi (born 1940), American businessman, sports executive, and husband of Nancy Pelosi
- Roberta Pelosi (born 1960), Italian sport shooter
- Ron Pelosi (born 1934), American politician and brother-in-law to Nancy Pelosi
- Salvatore Pelosi (1906–1974), Italian Naval officer who fought in World War II
