= Michiel Vos =

Dutch-American journalist, ex-lawyer, and producer

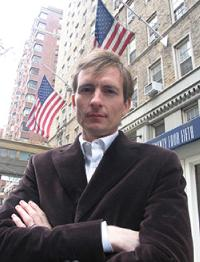
- Michiel Vos in 2008
- Born: December 19, 1970 (age 55); Groningen, Netherlands
- Occupations: Journalist, ex-lawyer, producer
- Years active: 2000–Present
- Spouse: Alexandra Pelosi (m. 2005)
- Children: 2

Michiel Vos (born December 19, 1970) is a Dutch-American journalist and US-based correspondent. He is the author of the Dutch book Vos in de VS.

== Biography ==
He is married to filmmaker Alexandra Pelosi, daughter of former Speaker of the United States House of Representatives Nancy Pelosi and Paul Pelosi. They met in Amsterdam when Vos was working for the broadcasting station VPRO, as a presenter for special film nights. The couple have two children.

Vos is an American correspondent for RTL. He hosted a Dutch/Belgian TV series called My America about his experiences as a European living in America. He regularly appears on Dutch and Belgian television and radio commenting on American political affairs and news as well as on his experiences in the USA. For over two decades he has had a weekly spot on De Wild in De Middag.

In May 2024, he published the book Vos in de VS about his life in America.

The HBO film Citizen USA was based on Vos's journey to become an American Citizen.

Vos worked as producer on the HBO films: The Trials of Ted Haggard, Right America: Feeling Wronged, and Friends of God. His wife Alexandra Pelosi is the sister-in-law of Peter Kaufman, who is the son of filmmaker Philip Kaufman.

== Personal life ==
Michiel Vos married Alexandra Pelosi in Greenwich Village on June 18, 2005.

In November 2006, they had their first son Paul Vos, named after Alexandra Pelosi's father Paul Pelosi. They had their second son on December 7, 2007, named Thomas Vos, after Alexandra Pelosi's grandfather Thomas D'Alesandro Jr. Vos' sons often appear in his television programs. His American family is featured throughout his show. The San Francisco Chronicle pointed out that when Vos has screenings "a healthy contingent of Pelosis" are always present.

They live in Greenwich Village in Manhattan, New York City. Vos wrote a book about his favorite places in New York City.

== Bibliography ==
- The 500 Hidden Secrets of New York (2018, with Ellen Swandiak)
- Vos in de VS ("Vos in the US", 2024, in Dutch)
