= Brady Boyd =

American evangelist (born 1967)

Brady Boyd (born January 11, 1967) is an American Evangelical who served as senior pastor of New Life Church in Colorado Springs, Colorado, from 2007 to 2025. He resigned following the allegation that he helped cover up the sexual abuse of a child by fellow megachurch pastor Robert Morris.

== Biography ==
Boyd graduated from Simsboro High School in 1985 and graduated from Louisiana Tech University in 1989 with a degree in journalism. He has worked as a high school English teacher, basketball coach and sports broadcaster.

He was a lay leader at Trinity Fellowship in Amarillo, Texas from 1997 to 1998 and the senior pastor of Trinity Fellowship Church in Hereford, Texas from 1998 to 2001. In March 2001, he became associate senior pastor at Gateway Church in Southlake, Texas. He became the senior pastor of New Life Church in August 2007, after the resignation of Ted Haggard.

Boyd resigned from New Life Church in June 2025 following the allegation that he helped cover up the sexual abuse of a child by his former boss at Gateway, Robert Morris.

== Personal life ==
Boyd has been married to Pam Boyd since August 12, 1989, and has two children.

== Books ==
- Oceans of Grace: A Year of Devotions Celebrating 15 Years of God's Goodness (2022) ISBN 979-8840477373
- Extravagant: Discovering a Life of Dangerous Generosity (2020) ISBN 1-9821-0140-7
- Remarkable: Living a Faith Worth Talking About (2019) ISBN 1-982-10137-7
- Speak Life (2016) ISBN 1-434-70689-3
- Addicted to Busy (2014) ISBN 0-781-41034-7
- Let Her Lead (2013) ISBN 1-535-31410-9
- Sons and Daughters: Spiritual Orphans Finding Our Way Home (2012) ISBN 0-310-32769-5
- Fear No Evil (2011) ISBN 0-310-32770-9
