= Diary of a Political Tourist =

Diary of a Political Tourist is a 2004 HBO documentary film that was filmed, written, and directed by Alexandra Pelosi, daughter of Nancy Pelosi. The film features candidates from the 2004 Democratic Party presidential primaries, and includes John Kerry, Joe Lieberman, John Edwards, Bob Graham, Richard Gephardt, Howard Dean, General Wesley Clark, and President George W. Bush.

At the film premiere in Washington D.C., Scottish singer Donovan said it was "Extraordinary!, this is what Andy Warhol was doing in 1966 at the Factory - sending teams of filmmakers out to ask real questions." The film was accompanied by Pelosi's first book, Sneaking into the Flying Circus: How the Media Turn Our Presidential Campaigns into Freak Shows.

Diary of a Political Tourist follows Pelosi's 2000 video diary Journeys with George in which she joined the press following Bush's 2000 presidential campaign.
