= We Belong to Jesus =

Studio album by New Life Church featuring Jared Anderson & Friends
- Released: January 14, 2014
- Recorded: 2013
- Genre: Worship; children's music
- Length: 46:00
- Label: Integrity Music
- Producer: Michael Rossback

We Belong to Jesus featuring Jared Anderson & Friends is the first album of praise and worship for children from New Life Church. New Life Worship released the album on January 14, 2014, under the Integrity Music label. The recording captures songs birthed out of the vibrant children's ministry of New Life Church. Featuring Jared Anderson, youth and adult worship leaders, and an energetic group of more than 135 kids led by choir director Amanda Ferrin, the CD has 11 high-energy praise songs of faith and worship for kids of all ages.

== Critical reception ==
Professional ratings
Review scores
Source	Rating
Cross Rhythms	8/10 squares
Louder Than the Music	3.5/5 stars

Stephen Curry, indicating in an eighth out of ten review from Cross Rhythms, says: We Belong to Jesus is "an album of good melodies, imaginatively produced, which teach solid truth".

Timothy Yap from Hallels criticized the album, stating: Would Jared Anderson and his team do better if they have actually written songs geared specifically for children rather than just trying to squeeze adult-songs into smaller minds? Nevertheless, if you do not want to see your teenagers leave the faith later in life, start now by soaking their ears, hearts and minds with worship that is contemporary, intelligent and cool.

Signaling in a three and a half star review for Louder Than the Music, Tom Hind states, "On the whole, this does actually seem to work, and the 11 songs from New Life Worship’s songbook that have been reinvigorated and refocused for a younger generation do seem to come out fairly well".

== Awards and accolades ==
In the 2014, this album was nominated for Dove Award in the category: "Children's Music Album of the Year".

== Track listing ==
No.	Title	Writer(s)	Length
1.	"Counting On God"	Jared Anderson	3:41
2.	"Impossible Possible"	Anderson; Don Poythress	3:53
3.	"Dance Dance Shake It Up / It Was for Freedom"	Anderson	4:22
4.	"We Belong"	Anderson; Poythress; Anthony Skinner; Brady Toops	4:11
5.	"According to His Word"	Anderson	3:17
6.	"Victorious God"	Ian Eskelin; Glenn Packiam	3:41
7.	"Strong God"	Jon Egan; Jason Ingram; Meredith Andrews	5:12
8.	"Light of Salvation"	Egan	3:57
9.	"Never Be Shaken"	Anderson	3:06
10.	"Magnified"	Egan; Ingram; Paul Mabury	5:37
11.	"Just Give Me Jesus / 'Tis So Sweet to Trust in Jesus"	Anderson; Ross Parsley	5:50
Total length:			46:00

== Personnel ==
Piano & Vocals: Jared Anderson

Vocals: Amanda Ferrin, Caleb Parsley, Emma Parsley, Ty Mares & Natalie Merril, Paige Parsley & Sophia Packiam.

The New Life Kids Choir: Abigail Van Matre, Addison Kennedy, Addison Miller, Adelyn Perkins, Aiden Griffin, Aiden Wilcox, Alexa Perez, Alivia Perkins, Allia Strycker, Allison Bolin, Alyssa Herron, Amanda Brooks, Amanda Marken, Amanda Mullenix, Amber Burgess, Amelian Herron, Andrew Wilhelm, Annie Otto, Aubre Copeland, Austin Armstrong, Barret Chowning, Ava Wegrezyn, Beckett Anderson, Bella Robertson, Ben Mullenix, Brayden Clark, Breanna Atnip, Brielle Kohn, Brittany White, Britton Griffin, Brody Chowning, Brooke Parsley, Caden Anderson, Cale Cook, Caleb Parsley, Caleb Phillips, Cambria Hoff, Cassidy Swart, Caylie Dodge, Charlee Mares, Chloe Forrest, Cole Perez, Cole Prater, Cooper Aumiller, Corrie Anderson, Dawn McClure, Dawson Perkins, Dinique Vosioo, Eli Ramsdell, Eliana Johnson, Ellie Poli, Embrie Kohn, Emma Forbus, Emma Hawkins, Emma Marano, Emma Moerman, Emma Parsley, Emma Shriver, Estelle Wiese, Everett Anderson, Francie Anderson, Grffin Miller, Haley Pettigrew, Holden Stennett, Hudson Anderson, Hunter Hrbeck, Ian White, Jace Valasquez, Jada Laing, Jaycee Noetzelman, Jazmine Brannan, Jillian Dunnagan, Johny Hrbeck, Josh Browen, Josh Cook, Josh Hrbeck, Josh Mullenix, Josh Phillips, Journey Forrest, Kaeley Grob, Karis Bowen, Katherine Bolin, Kathryn Thompson, Katie Champlin, Kaylee Wegrezyn, Kendall Flynn, Kryssa Moerman, Kylee Keesler, Kylee Kuster, Kylie Prater, Levi Kersey, Lillian Tolliver, Lily Forbus, Lily Marano, Lizzie Schneider, Lola Leander, Lorena Valdez, Maddie Mason, Mairin Carpenter, Maisey Streideck, Maleah Douma, Marissa Stephen, Mckenna Collins, Megan Carison, Meredith Anderson, Meredith Miles, Micah Dunnagan, Michaela Cimato, Nate Wilhelm, Nathan Aumiller, Noah Brooks, Norah Packiam, Paige Parsley, Parker Lukenbill, Patience Mares, Reed Miles, Ricardo Valdez, Riley Atnip, Riley Pettigrew, Ruth Aumiller, Ryien Isham, Sam Parker, Sam Wilhelm, Sara Drilling, Sara Shriver, Shaela Leahy, Shannon Paine, Sophia Curtis, Sophia Packiam, Suzanne Carison, Tara Prater, Tatum Kersey, Trey Merrill, William Mares, Wyatt Aumiller, Yzebella Tafoya & Zachary Brannan.

Additional Vocals: Alexa Perez, Brittany White, Caleb Parsley, Cassidy Swart, Corrie Anderson, Emma Parsley, EmmaRose Forbus, Gabrielle Alonso, Ian White, Lillian Forbus, Natalie Merrill, Paige Parsley & Sophia Packiam.

New Life Kids Choir Director: Amanda Ferrin.

Adult Worship Leaders: Evie Swart, Tiffany Anderson, Heather Moerman, Edie Pettegrew, Angie Mares, Bekah Shirin, Lori Leander, Dianne Dunnagan, Roxanne Lingle, Sharon Brooks, Angela White, Kelly Marano, Trina Hoosier & Cassandra Anderson.

Teen Worship Leaders: Amanda Woff, Daniel Lorring, Emily Fields, Gabrielle Alonso, Haley Dills, Prater, Hannah Hrbeck, Isaac Brocks, Janea Carlson, Janell Hoff, Jasmine Noetzelman, Jazelle Brannan, Julian Prater, Karlyn Leander, Madison Marano, Mason Miles, Natalie Merrill, Paul Broocks, Sabrina Aumiller, Ty Mares, Victoria Ramsdell & Zach Miles.

Drums: Kylie Scott & Jared Anderson.

Keys & Programming, Bass & Electric Guitar: Michael Rossback.

Additional Keys: James Guerra.

Electric Guitar: Erick Todd.

Production A/V Tech Director: Kevin Moorehouse.

Audio Engineer: David Jacobson.

Assistant Audio Engineer: David Samuel.

Lyrics: Michael DeHerrera.

Lighting Director: Kristian Binion.

Lighting Assistants: Creston Jones & Nick Markel.

A&R: Steve Merkel

Mastered by: Andrew Mendalson, Georgetown Masters.

Illustration by: Ashlie Weisel.

Creative Director: Thom Hoyman.

Production Corrdinator: Becca Nicholson.

Produced, Engineered, & Mixed by: Michael Rossback.

Executive Producer: C. Ryan Dunham.
