= New Life Church (Colorado Springs, Colorado) =

Megachurch

Coordinates: 38°59′33″N 104°47′44″W

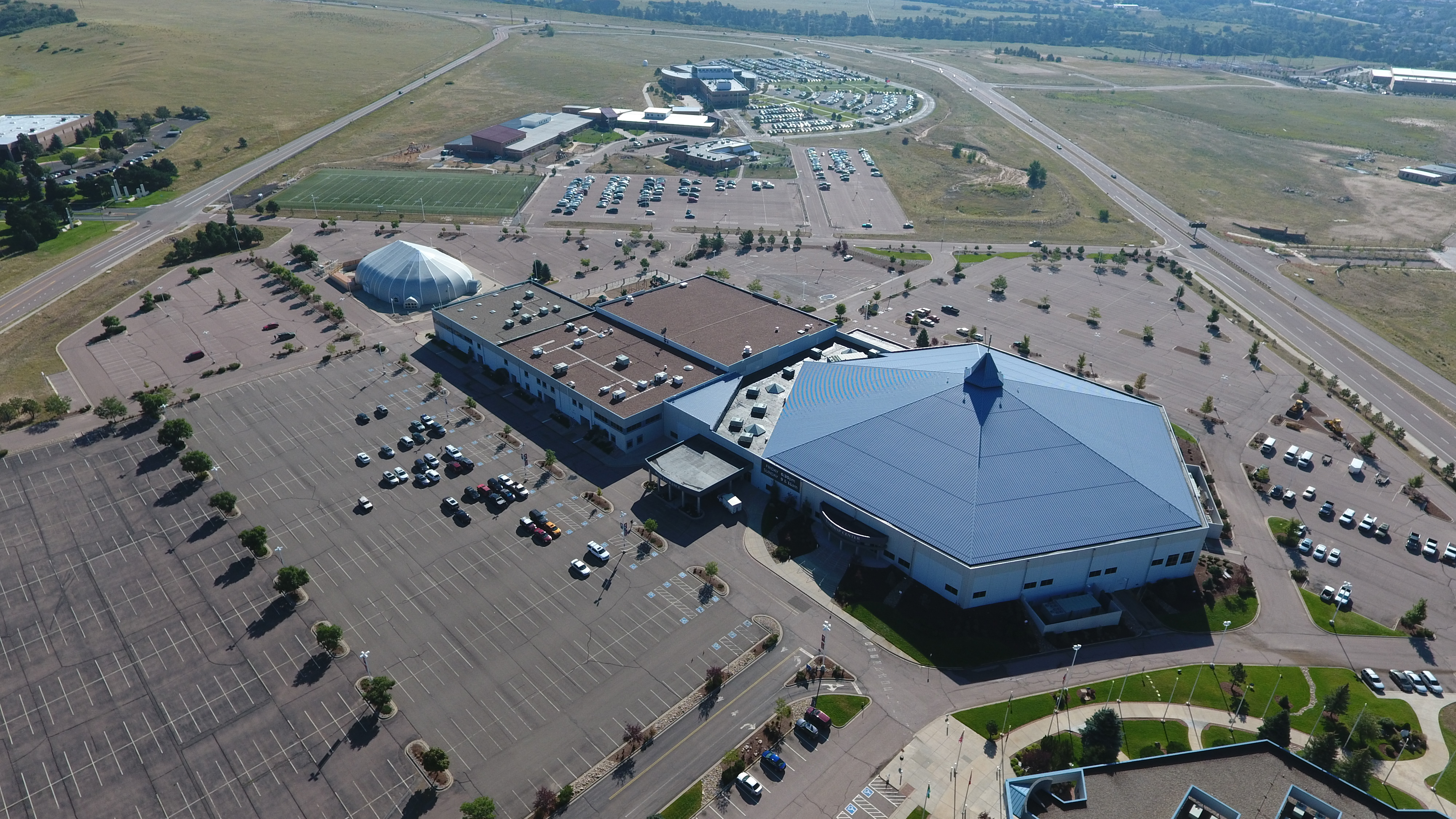
- The church grounds of New Life North
- New Life Church
- Location: Colorado Springs, Colorado
- Country: United States
- Denomination: Nondenominational
- Website: www.newlifechurch.org

History
- Founded: 1984

New Life Church is a charismatic evangelical non-denominational multi-site megachurch based in Colorado Springs, Colorado, United States.

== History ==
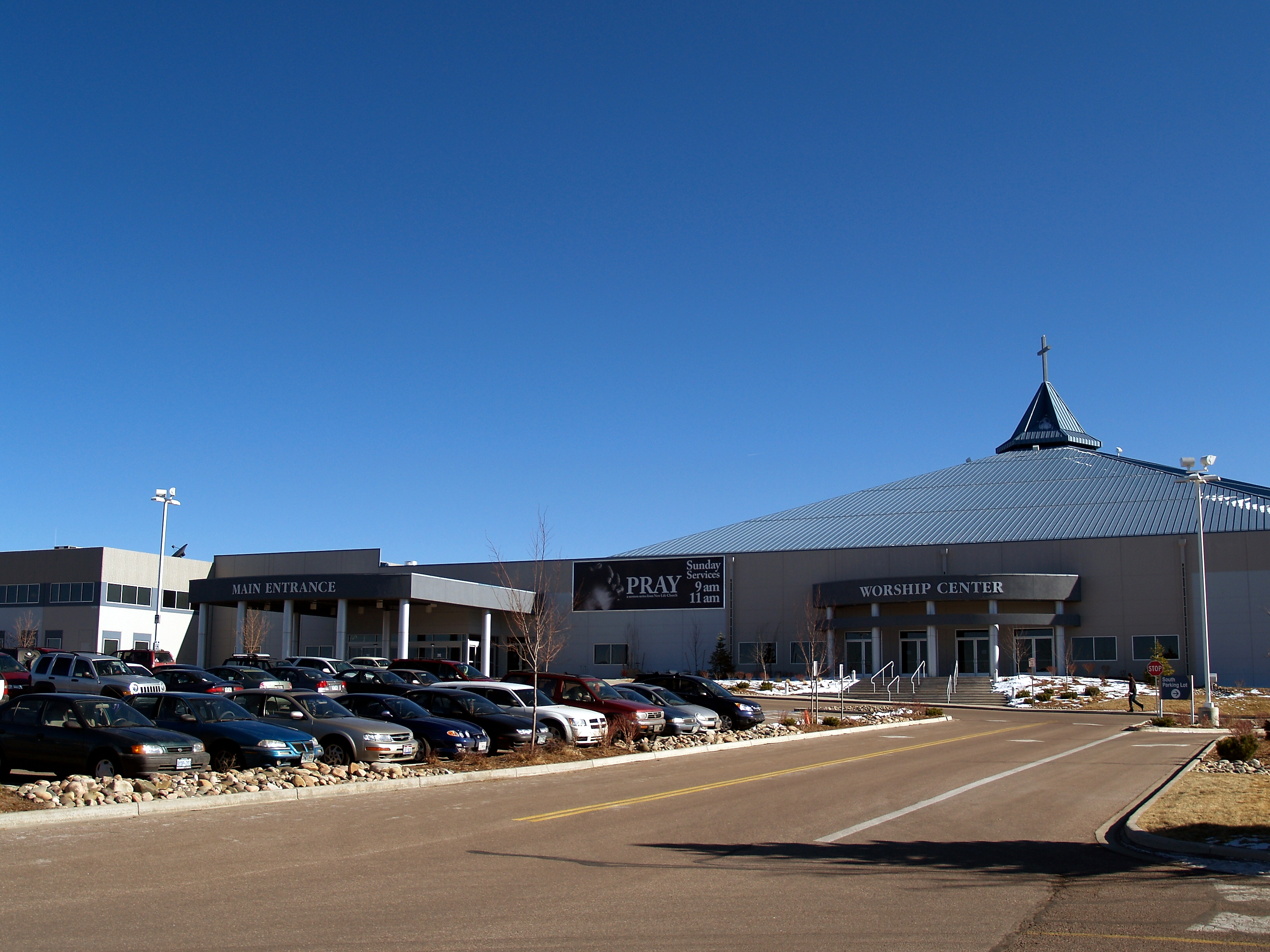
The south entrance and worship center

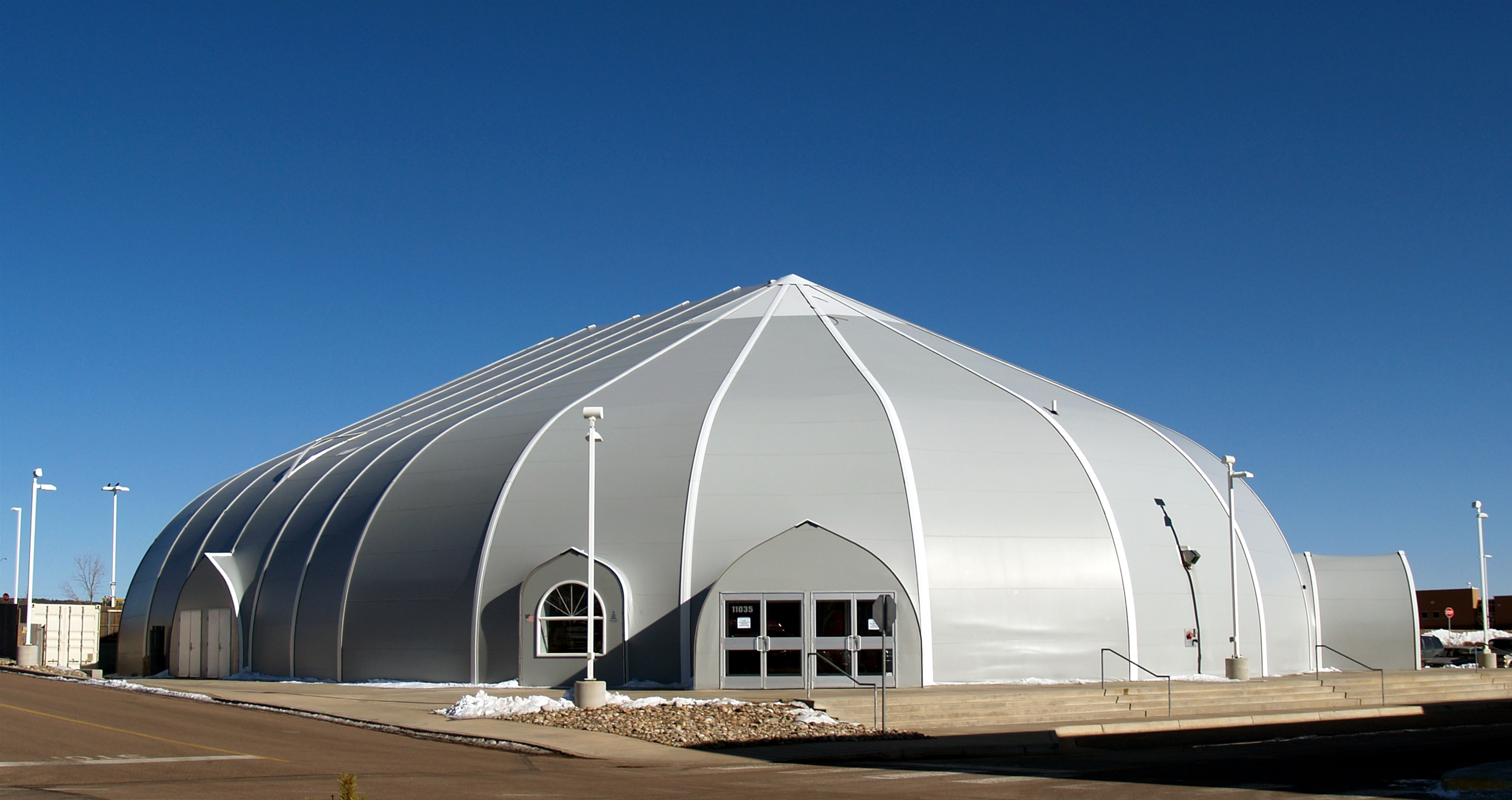
"The Student Center"

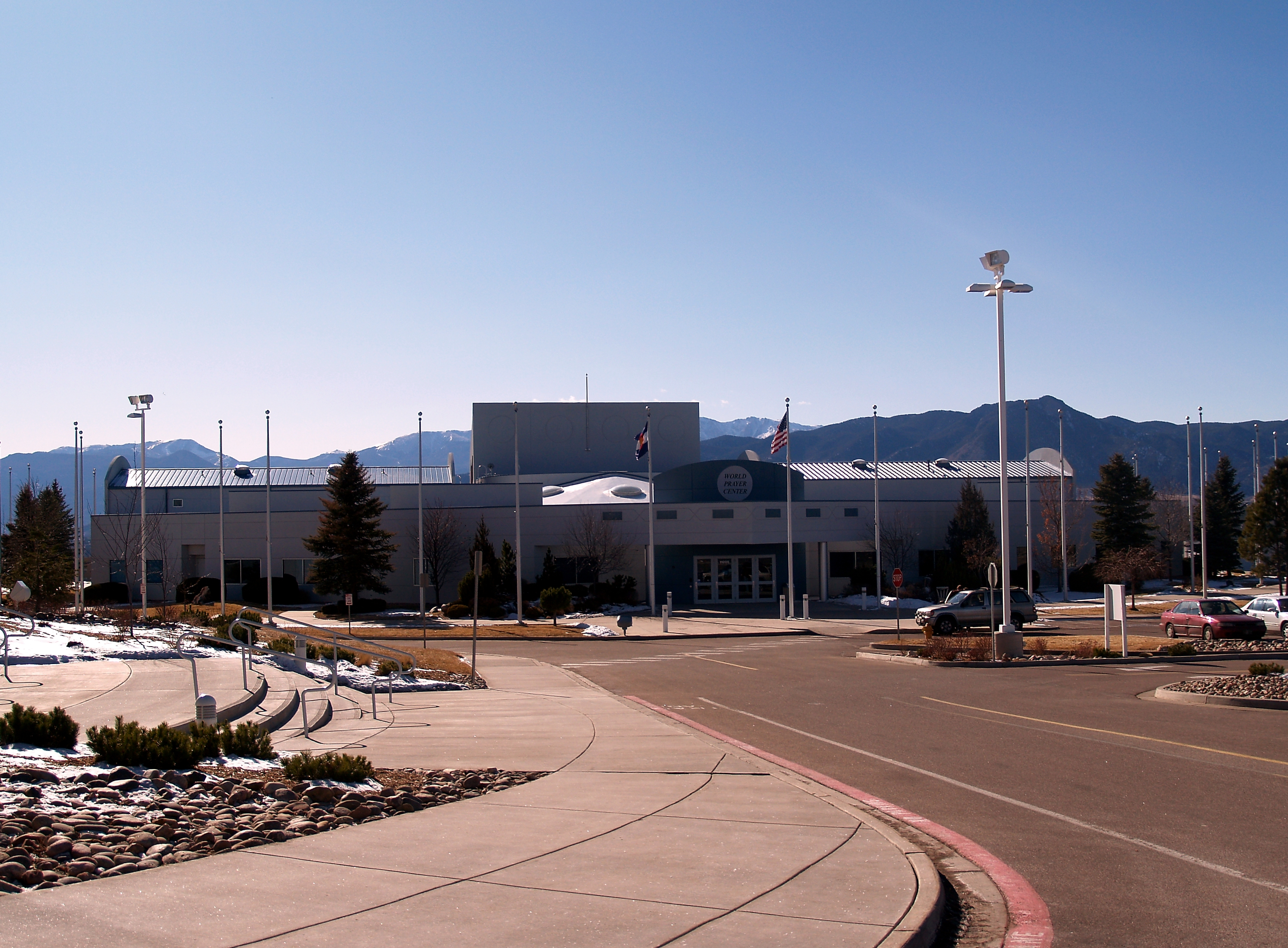
The World Prayer Center

New Life Church was founded in 1984 by Ted Haggard. The church started under his leadership as an independent church meeting in his home. From these origins, the church grew through a succession of larger meeting spaces including strip mall office space and other non-traditional church locations.

The initial sanctuary on the campus, now referred to as the "theater", seats 2,000 and was dedicated in 1990. It is used primarily for the New Life Friday Night congregation and New Life Kids on Sunday mornings.

The New Life campus is also home to the World Prayer Center, which opened in 1998. The World Prayer Team organization founded global internet-based prayer efforts among its participants out of this building. The World Prayer Team is under the direction of Modern Day Missions. The building hosts prayer rooms.

The Student Center which was dedicated in 2003 and is used for various ministry gatherings including the Junior High Sunday Service.

The current main sanctuary (referred to as the Living Room) seats 8,000 and was dedicated in 2005.

In August 2007, Brady Boyd became senior pastor.

According to a church census released in 2023, it claimed a weekly attendance of 15,000 people and eight campuses throughout the Colorado Springs area.

In June 2025, Brady Boyd resigned as senior pastor after church elders decided that he had misled the church concerning his knowledge of Robert Morris’s child abuse.

=== Ted Haggard scandals and resignation ===
On November 2, 2006, Haggard was accused of paying a male escort for sex for three years and of also using methamphetamine. Later the same day, Haggard voluntarily stepped down as pastor so "the overseer process can be allowed to proceed with integrity", and that he would be seeking "spiritual advice and guidance". Two days later, New Life Church's Board of Overseers announced that they had decided to permanently dismiss Haggard from his role.

In January 2009, new allegations emerged that Haggard, while pastor at New Life, had an inappropriate relationship with a former attendee. Haggard's successor, Brady Boyd, said the church reached a six-figure settlement with the man, who was in his early 20s at the time. According to a News Channel 13 report, the man said the contact was "not consensual".

=== Shooting ===
On December 9, 2007, Matthew Murray, age 24, opened fire in the New Life Church, hitting five people and killing two, sisters Rachel and Stephanie Works; their father David Works was one of the individuals injured. Jeanne Assam, a church security volunteer, shot and wounded the gunman who then killed himself. Several hours prior, the same gunman opened fire at a Youth With A Mission training center in Arvada, Colorado, hitting four people and killing two. He was formerly a missionary-in-training with Youth With A Mission and was from a devout Christian family. Police found a letter from the shooter addressed "To God".

=== Spiritual mapping, spiritual warfare, and C. Peter Wagner ===
Since its beginnings, the church has engaged in spiritual mapping, in which areas believed to be spiritually controlled by territorial spirits (demons) are plotted out using maps and prayed against, preferably on-location, through spiritual warfare. In the mid-1990s, church members traveled to Mali, where they anointed villages to stop demonic forces. The following year, the church also mapped Colorado Springs and used a "24/7 prayer shield" in order to protect the city from demonic invasion. Dutch missionary René Holvast and American radio journalist Alix Spiegel, observing this in Mali and Colorado, respectively, found themselves discovering what Holvast termed a "new paradigm" in Christian missions. Both the newly-growing concepts of spiritual mapping and strategic spiritual warfare were key parts of C. Peter Wagner's New Apostolic Reformation teachings. Haggard and the church worked closely with Wagner to support him, as well as Luis Bush (known for coining the term 10/40 Window). Holvast would later go on to write his dissertation on the topic and Spiegel covered it in a radio episode. The church "and the adjacent World Prayer Center that was dedicated in 1998 were, for roughly a decade, the epicenter of an ongoing, radical redefinition of Christianity."

== New Life Worship ==
New Life Church has produced several songwriters and worship leaders, including Ross Parsley, Jon Egan, Glenn Packiam, Jared Anderson, Cory Asbury, and Pete Sanchez. Several albums and songs have been released through New Life Worship and Desperation Band.

New Life Worship is under the direction of Jon Egan.

== Influence ==
New Life Church, along with Focus on the Family, established Colorado Springs as a conservative evangelical center in the 1990s. In 2005, Jeff Sharlet claimed that while New Life is "by no means the largest megachurch ... [it] holds more sway over the political direction of evangelicalism" than any other church in America.

== In popular culture ==
Ted Haggard and other members of the church were featured on a 1997 episode of the PRI radio program This American Life, as well as the documentaries Jesus Camp, Friends of God, Constantine's Sword, The Root of All Evil?, and HBO's The Trials of Ted Haggard.
