= New Life Worship =

American band

- Origin: Colorado Springs, Colorado
- Genres: Contemporary worship music, contemporary Christian music
- Years active: 1991–present
- Label: Integrity
- Spinoffs: Desperation Band
- Website: north.newlifechurch.org/worship

New Life Worship is an American contemporary worship music band out of New Life Church in Colorado Springs, Colorado.

== History ==
Associated with Colorado's New Life Church, the worship group New Life Worship was launched in 1991 when Ross Parsley formed the New Life Ministries. New Life Worship made their debut in 1998 with the album Celebrate New Life. The band is known for its songwriters and worship leaders including Ross Parsley, Jon Egan, Glenn Packiam, Jared Anderson, Cory Asbury, Pete Sanchez, Micah Massey, Eddie Hoagland and Dee Wilson.

New Life Worship is now under the direction of Eddie Hoagland, while Jon Egan leads most Sundays at New Life North. As of 2021, they began inviting many more well-known leaders like Dee Wilson and his wife, and Grammy winner Micah Massey.

== Discography ==
Albums series

- Celebrate New Life (1998)
- I Am Free (2004)
- My Savior Lives (2006)
- My Savior Lives: Resource Edition (2007)
- Counting On God: Live (2008)
- My Savior Lives: Live (2010)
- You Hold It All: Live (2011)
- Strong God: Live (2013)
- Soak (2015)
- Over It All: Live (2022)
- God Is: Live (2024)

Singles

Nobody But You (2023)

New Life Worship Kids

- We Belong to Jesus (2014)
