= Meet the Donors: Does Money Talk? =

Meet the Donors: Does Money Talk? is a 2016 documentary by Alexandra Pelosi about American political fundraising circuit. In it, Pelosi visits fundraisers, and talks with wealthy donors from both political parties.

On CNN, Film Critic Brian Lowery declared that "with so much discussion about the toxic influence of money on politics, this film could hardly be better timed or more relevant."
