= San Francisco 2.0 =

San Francisco 2.0 is a documentary film by Alexandra Pelosi for HBO, in which she examines the past of San Francisco, and speculates on what the future holds for it in the light of gentrification resulting from the dot-com boom.

San Francisco 2.0 was nominated for the Outstanding Business and Economic Reporting - Long Form Emmy in 2015.
