= Citizen USA: A 50 State Road Trip =

- Directed by: Alexandra Pelosi
- Produced by: Alexandra Pelosi; Michiel Vos
- Cinematography: Alexandra Pelosi
- Release date: 2011
- Country: United States
- Language: English

Citizen USA: A 50 State Road Trip is an HBO documentary film directed by Alexandra Pelosi.

== Overview ==
A documentary about new American immigrants that spans all fifty states.
