= Outside the Bubble: A Roadtrip with Alexandra Pelosi =

2018 film directed by Alexandra Pelosi

- Poster
- Directed by: Alexandra Pelosi
- Starring: Alexandra Pelosi
- Country of origin: United States
- Original language: English

Production
- Producers: Alexandra Pelosi; Lisa Heller

Original release
- Network: HBO
- Release: October 29, 2018

Outside the Bubble: A Roadtrip with Alexandra Pelosi is Alexandra Pelosi's 12th HBO Documentary with Sheila Nevins as executive producer and Lisa Heller as senior producer.

Alexandra Pelosi said after making the film, "If you made me, I could literally come up with a [list of] Tea Party people who have invited me to spend the night in their home across America."
