= Desperation Band =

American band (2002–2017)

- Origin: Colorado Springs, Colorado
- Genres: Contemporary worship music, contemporary Christian music
- Years active: 2002–2017
- Label: Integrity
- Spinoff of: New Life Worship
- Past members: Jared Anderson; Glenn Packiam; Erick Todd; Jon Egan; Jared Henderson; Dan Egan; Roderick Mendoza; Regan Cruz; Nico Perez; Matt Pacco; Jonathan Moos; Steven Krow
- Website: www.desperationband.com (appears defunct)

Desperation Band was an American worship band led by Jon Egan, as part of the worship ministry of New Life Church in Colorado Springs, Colorado.

The band has been featured on the main stage at Creation East and Kingdom Bound, and has led worship in the Worship Tent at both Creation East and KingdomBound. They have also been featured on Teen Mania's Acquire the Fire tour dates in stadiums around the country. Their albums, recorded live at New Life Church, appear on Integrity’s Vertical Music label and feature "high-energy, passionate new worship songs that convey the hunger of their generation for God."

== Career ==
Desperation Band was first formed in 2001, when New Life Church pastor David Perkins suggested that Jon Egan, Jared Anderson, and Glenn Packiam play together with their bands at the first Desperation Conference. Held annually in July, Desperation Conferences draw thousands of college and high school students.

The song "I Am Free", written by band co-founder Jon Egan and recorded by the band for 2004's From the Rooftops, was later covered by the Newsboys, for whom it became a hit single.

== Discography ==
1. Desperation (2003)
2. From the Rooftops (2004)
3. Who You Are (2006)
4. Sessions & Remixes EP (2007)
5. Everyone Overcome (2007)
6. Light Up the World (2009)
7. Update: Live (2011)
8. Center of it All (April 2012)
9. Banner (September 30, 2014)
