= The Words That Built America =

Documentary by Alexandra Pelosi

- Directed by: Alexandra Pelosi
- Country of origin: United States
- Original language: English

Production
- Running time: 59 minutes
- Production company: HBO Documentary Films

Original release
- Release: 2017

The Words That Built America is a documentary made by Alexandra Pelosi, in celebration of the 230th anniversary of the United States Constitution. It is narrated by historian David McCullough.

It features various legislators and judges reading the Constitution, as well as middle-school students reading the Bill of Rights and a summary of the other amendments.

On Constitution Day 2017, the film premiered at the National Archives.
