= Right America: Feeling Wronged – Some Voices from the Campaign Trail =

2009 American documentary film

- Directed by: Alexandra Pelosi
- Starring: Barack Obama; John McCain; Sarah Palin
- Country of origin: United States
- Original language: English

Production
- Producers: Alexandra Pelosi; Michiel Vos
- Editors: Victoria Ford; Sari Gilman; Michael Levine; Pax Wassermann
- Running time: 45 minutes

Original release
- Network: HBO
- Release: February 16, 2009

Right America: Feeling Wronged – Some Voices from the Campaign Trail is a documentary film directed by Alexandra Pelosi. The film premiered on HBO on President's Day 2009. This is the first film to document the birth of the Tea Party Movement.

== Synopsis ==
This is a documentary that highlights conservative American reactions to the Democratic victory of the 2008 presidential election.
