= Fall to Grace (film) =

- Directed by: Alexandra Pelosi
- Starring: Alexandra Pelosi; Jim McGreevey
- Theme music composer: Pat Irwin
- Country of origin: United States
- Original language: English

Production
- Producers: Alexandra Pelosi; Lisa Heller
- Cinematography: Alexandra Pelosi
- Editors: Ken Eluto; Tom Patterson
- Running time: 48 minutes

Original release
- Network: HBO
- Release: March 28, 2013

Fall to Grace is a 2013 documentary film produced, filmed and directed by Alexandra Pelosi.

== Plot ==
The film covers the career of former New Jersey Governor Jim McGreevey after his "fall from grace" that led to his resignation from political office in the wake of an extramarital affair, to his admission that he was a homosexual, and a bitter divorce battle. In the years after his resignation, McGreevey pursued a calling to become an Episcopal priest, obtained a Master of Divinity degree at New York City's General Theological Seminary. In recent years, McGreevey has counseled female inmates seeking rehabilitation at correctional facilities in the greater New Jersey/New York area.

== Release ==
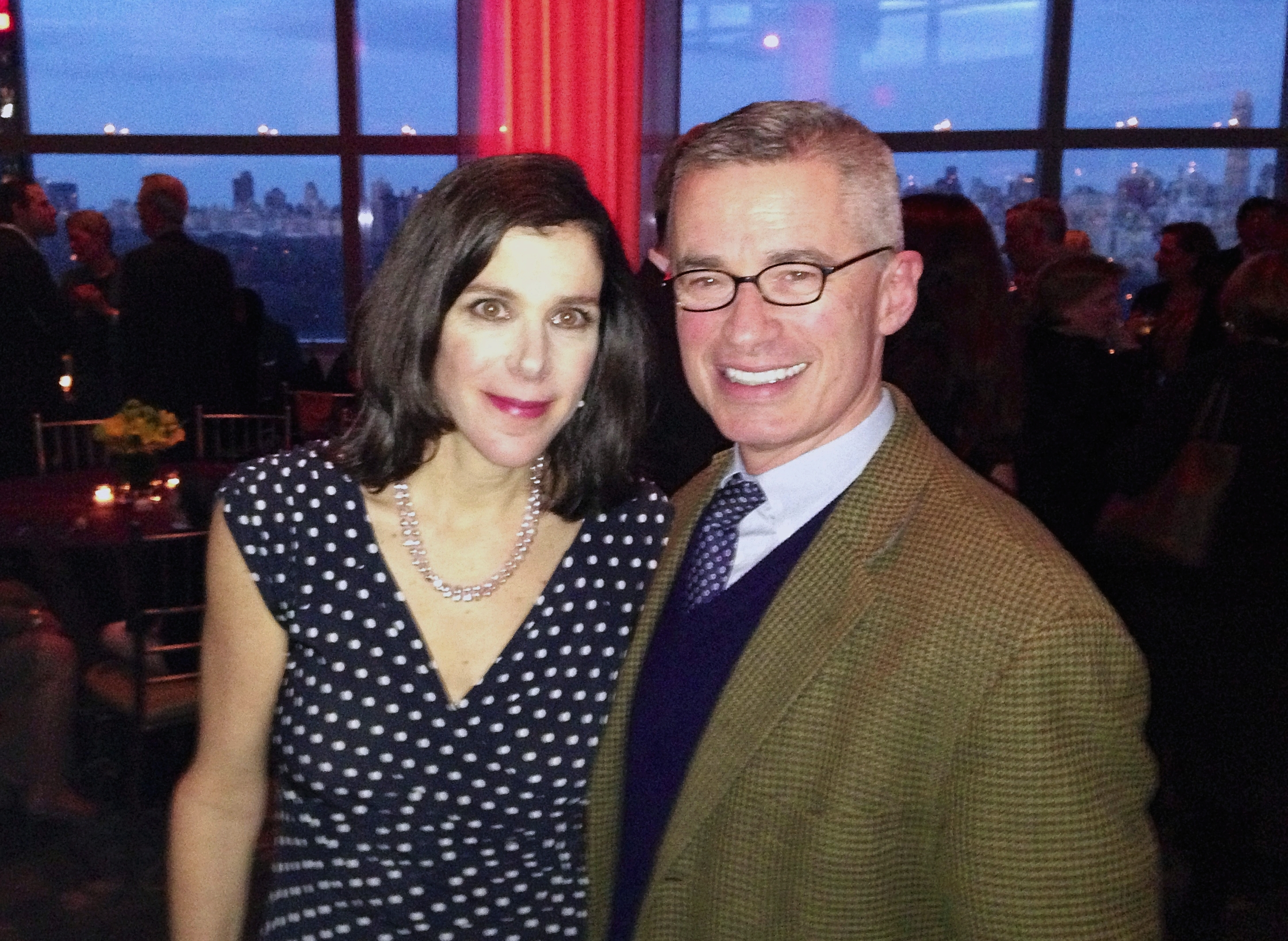
Filmmaker Alexandra Pelosi and McGreevey at the HBO screening of Fall to Grace in March 2013.

Fall to Grace was an official selection at the 2013 Sundance Film Festival and premiered on HBO on 28 March 2013. The film also opened the 2013 Golden Door Film Festival.
