= Jared Anderson (Christian musician) =

American Christian musician

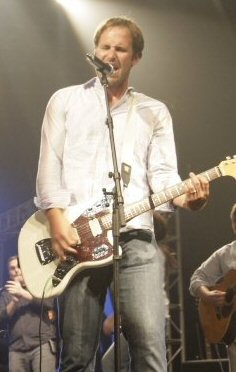
- Anderson in concert (2008)

Background information
- Origin: Colorado Springs, Colorado
- Genres: Worship music, contemporary Christian music
- Years active: 2001–present
- Labels: Integrity, Centricity
- Member of: New Life Worship
- Formerly of: Desperation Band

Jared Anderson is a Christian worship leader from Colorado Springs, Colorado. He grew up in the New Life Church where he served for many years as part of New Life Worship and the Desperation Band. Anderson has released four solo albums with Integrity Music, titled Where to Begin (2006), Where Faith Comes From (2008), LIVE From My Church (2009) and The Narrow Road (2012).

== Discography ==
- 2001: 12 Off the Shelf (independent)
- 2006: Where to Begin (Integrity Music)
- 2006: Arise: A Celebration of Worship (Integrity Music)
- 2008: Where Faith Comes From (Integrity Music)
- 2008: Two Days In the Same Place (independent)
- 2009: People of Troy (independent)
- 2009: Live from My Church (Integrity Music)
- 2012: The Narrow Road (Integrity Music)
- 2014: We Belong to Jesus (Integrity Music)

EPs

- 2015: Where I Am Right Now
- 2019: The Whole Landscape

with Desperation Band

- 2003: Desperation
- 2004: From the Rooftops
- 2006: Who You Are
- 2007: Everyone Overcome

with New Life Worship

- 2006: My Savior Lives
- 2008: Counting On God
