= Gayle Haggard =

American preacher

- Born: April 8, 1957 (age 69); United States
- Occupations: Author, speaker
- Spouse: Ted Haggard (m. 1978)
- Website: tedhaggard.com

Gayle M. Haggard (née Alcorn, born April 8, 1957) is an author, speaker and the wife of American evangelical preacher Ted Haggard.

== Life and career ==
Haggard and her husband founded New Life Church in Colorado Springs, in 1985, with meetings in the basement of their home. The church grew to 14,000 members by 2006, with a large campus on the north side of Colorado Springs, Colorado.

In November 2006, Haggard's husband revealed to her that he had engaged in extramarital homosexual activity and drug use. Once this became public the couple were removed from the New Life Church. When Haggard subsequently lost her position as the Director of Women's Ministries due to her husband’s removal from his position as pastor, she told the congregation via a letter written to them, “What I want you to know is that I love my husband, Ted Haggard, with all my heart. I am committed to him until death 'do us part.' We started this journey together and with the grace of God, we will finish together.” She went on to say that she wanted the women of New Life Church to “watch her” as she hoped to prove herself faithful.

Haggard's book Why I Stayed, authored with Angela Hunt, was released in January 2010. The book is the story of her marriage to Ted Haggard and how they survived his infidelity. The book also teaches the fundamental Christian message of forgiveness and restoration while chronicling the events that took place during the three years after the scandal broke.

During her time of ministry at New Life Church, Haggard led a large women's ministry with up to 150 small groups meeting throughout the city. She taught wives of ministry leaders at leadership conferences held at the church. She spearheaded the citywide observance of the National Day of Prayer, making it the second largest event of its kind in the nation.

In 2006, Haggard started a new ministry for women at New Life Church called "Women Belong". Her aim was to teach the message of acceptance and love in the body of Christ. Her message of encouragement for women was featured as a chapter in two separate books, Leading Women to the Heart of God (2002) and Free to Soar (2005). Her first full-length book was written to other wives of pastors and was published in 2004, entitled, A Life Embraced, A Hopeful Guide for the Pastor’s Wife.

=== Television and movie appearances ===
- Celebrity Wife Swap (2012)
- Larry King Live
- CNN
- Oprah Winfrey
- HBO's The Trials of Ted Haggard
- Divorce Court

== Books ==
- Why I Stayed: The Choices I Made in My Darkest Hour (2010) ISBN 978-1-4143-3586-5 (with Angela Elwell Hunt)
- From This Day Forward: Making Your Vows Last a Lifetime (2006) ISBN 1-4000-7255-7—(with Ted Haggard)
- A Life Embraced: A Hopeful Guide for the Pastor's Wife (2004) ISBN 1-4000-7062-7
- Free to Soar (contributing author) (2005) ISBN 978-0-8307-3790-1
- Leading Women to the Heart of God (contributing author) (2002) ISBN 978-0-8024-4920-7
- Courageous Grace: Following the Way of Christ (2013) ISBN 978-1414-36500-8
