= James Robison (televangelist) =

American televangelist (1943–2026)

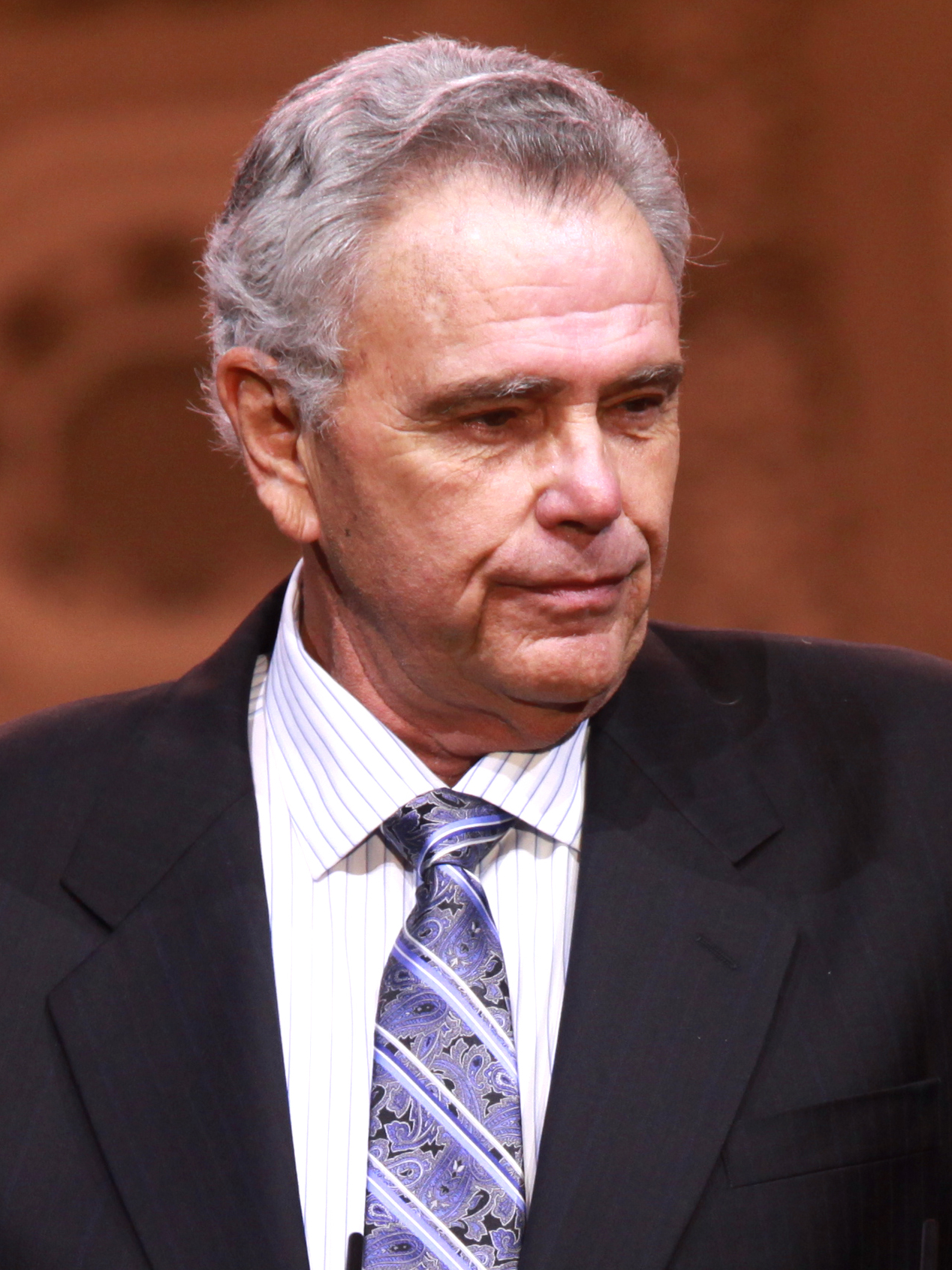
- Robison in 2014
- Born: October 9, 1943; Pasadena, Texas, U.S.
- Died: May 16, 2026 (aged 82)
- Education: B.A. Middle Tenn. State University
- Occupations: Pastor, televangelist, theologian, author
- Spouse: Betty Freeman (m. 1963)
- Children: 3
- Church: Southern Baptist (1965–1980s); Charismatic (1980s–his death 2026)
- Congregations served: Pastor/Worship Pastor at Restoration Church in Pasadena, Texas; Pastor/Worship Pastor at Newchurch Christian Fellowship in Pasadena, Texas; Founder, James Robison Evangelistic Ass'n; Co-Founder,LIFE Outreach Int'l; LIFE Today TV program (syndicated)
- Website: Official website

James Robison (October 9, 1943 – May 16, 2026) was an American televangelist and the founder and president of the Christian relief organization Life Outreach International.

== Life and career ==
=== Early life and ministry ===
Robison was born in Pasadena, Texas, on October 9, 1943. Robison's mother, Myra Wattinger, was a nurse. Robison revealed that he was the product of rape and that his mother placed an advertisement in a newspaper for a couple to take care of him. He spent the first five years of his life with H. D. Hale, a local area pastor, and his wife who answered the advertisement and took Robison in.

When he was five years old, his mother took him back, and eventually married the man who had raped her. Robison had a strained relationship with his biological father, who was an alcoholic, and whom he would wind up confronting in a violent manner at the age of 15. His father was arrested and Robison went back to the couple who adopted him, with whom his interest in Christianity and preaching was fostered.

=== Dominionism ===
In 1979, Robison lost his regular slot on WFAA-TV in Dallas for repeatedly attacking homosexuality, which he said was "almost too repulsive to imagine ... one of the vilest sins known to man." In August 1980, he spoke at the National Affairs Briefing (NAB), held in Dallas's Reunion Arena where he famously said, "I'm sick and tired of hearing about all the radicals and the perverts and the liberals and the leftists and the communists coming out of the closet. It's time for God's people to come out of the closet, out of the churches, and change America!". According to Mike Huckabee, who was Robison's communications director at the time, that rally was the genesis of the organization Moral Majority.

Robison eventually rose to become one of the more prominent and popular conservative religious leaders in politics during the early 1980s. However, in the mid-1980s, Robison abruptly withdrew from his political activities. He instead began focusing on his own church community, on church unity, and on seeking forgiveness. By his own admission, his demanding schedule had consumed him, and the popularity he had so quickly achieved, together with an increasing desire for more such admiration, had changed him into someone he no longer recognized and did not like. This opinion was held doubly by his wife, Betty. Around this time he changed his religious views from evangelicalism to the charismatic movement, leaving the Southern Baptist Convention in the process.

He with his wife, Betty, had been members of Gateway Church, the DFW megachurch formerly pastored by Robert Morris, who resigned after allegations he sexually abused a minor in the 1980s and eventually was convicted as a child sex offender (He was incarcerated for six months before being released in March 2026 and placed on probation for the remainder of his 10-year sentence). It was reported that Robison accompanied Morris in 1987 to meet the family of the 12-year-old girl Morris had abused over a period of years. Robison released a video on X refuting the claim, and added that he had a statement from the victim's attorney saying he was not present at the meeting. Robison went on further to condemn Morris' actions.

In 2010, he convened a meeting in Dallas with several prominent conservative religious leaders, including Richard Land and Tony Perkins, in order to make plans to replace Barack Obama with a more socially conservative president in 2012.

=== LIFE Today television program ===
The Robisons' television program, the daily television show LIFE Today, has aired around the world on various television networks, both secular and Christian, such as Trinity Broadcasting Network, and Daystar Television Network. It can also be seen on internet podcasts, as well as the Life Outreach International official website. LIFE Today often features guest interviews, musical guests and real stories from various guest viewers along with segments presenting the ministry's third-world mission outreach programs.

=== Christian retreat ===
In 1974, the James Robison Evangelistic Association purchased a hunting and fishing lodge near Hawkins, Texas, which the association developed into Brookhaven Retreat, a not-for-profit Christian camp and retreat center, still in operation today under different management.

=== Literary works ===
Robison authored more than a dozen books, including True Prosperity, Thank God I'm Free and My Father's Face. His book The Absolutes: Freedom's Only Hope (Tyndale House), Living In Love (Waterbrook Multnomah), Indivisible (Hachette), and "God of All Creation" (Waterbrook Multnomah).

=== The Stream ===
In 2015, Robison launched The Stream, based in Fort Worth, Texas, a "national daily where those concerned about our nation's perilous course can gather for news, wisdom and inspiration."

=== Personal life and death ===
Robison met his wife, Betty Freeman, while a student at Pasadena High School, and they wed on February 23, 1963, when both were 19. The couple, who together hosted the daily television program LIFE Today, started their ministry together in late 1965 and then went into full-time television ministry, through the Rev. Dr. Billy Graham, in 1968. James and Betty had three children, two biological daughters and one adopted son, and 11 grandchildren, and resided in Fort Worth, where their program LIFE Today and their ministry LIFE Outreach are based. They lost their daughter Robin to throat cancer in late 2012.

Robison died on May 16, 2026, at the age of 82. LIFE Outreach International announced his death the next day.

== Selected bibliography ==
- The Absolutes: Freedom's Only Hope
- True Prosperity
- The Soul of a Nation
