= Homeless: The Motel Kids of Orange County =

2010 American documentary film

Homeless: The Motel Kids of Orange County is a 2010 American documentary film directed, written, and filmed by Alexandra Pelosi. The film chronicles one summer in the lives of homeless children living in Orange County, California — one of the wealthiest regions of the U.S. The documentary was filmed with a handheld digital camera over the course of one summer, when Pelosi, joined by her husband and two children, stayed in a motel in Orange County. The film premiered on HBO on July 26, 2010.

The New York Times praised the film for "advancing a theme of the failed American dream." It goes on to describe the film this way, "Homeless presents endlessly charming children in scenes that become increasingly sad. In one of the most poignant, a group of children storm a Dumpster to scavenge the possessions left behind by an evicted family. One boy keeps returning despite his mother’s protests and finally walks away smiling with a binder and a green stuffed animal...the resilience and early maturity of children in bad situations is a familiar motif, but the 6-to-11-year-olds in “Homeless” convey a particularly heartbreaking blend of innocence and experience. They lead Ms. Pelosi around their world — room, parking lot, stairwell, Dumpster, drug dealer, sex offender — like experienced tour guides, some enthusiastic, some already defeated." USA Today praised Pelosi for taking on this subject matter, "Alexandra Pelosi uses film as a way to make political statements...'You expect to see kids in the dumpsters in Third World countries, but you don't expect it across the street from Disneyland,' says Emmy Award-winning documentary filmmaker Pelosi."

In interviews, Pelosi said that her motivation for making the film came from her children, "I live in Manhattan, I was walking down the street with my son, he said to me, “Mommy, why is that person sleeping on the street?” “Because he doesn’t have a home.” “Why doesn’t he have a home?” And I couldn’t come up with an answer."

After the film debuted, kids who survived growing up in motels went public to share their stories.
