= The Trials of Ted Haggard =

- Directed by: Alexandra Pelosi

Original release
- Network: HBO
- Release: 2009

The Trials of Ted Haggard is a documentary film made by Alexandra Pelosi, following disgraced pastor Ted Haggard. According to HBO, the film is a follow-up to Pelosi's 2007 HBO film Friends of God, which starred Haggard as the head of the National Association of Evangelicals. Pelosi returns to talk with 'Pastor Ted' about his fall from grace. The New York Times called it "strangely intriguing" because "The film doesn't merely document Mr. Haggard's fall from grace, it also tracks the pathology of his attempt at a comeback. It's a cautionary tale for disgraced public figures; for viewers it's a master class in the art of self-serving remorse and hubris dressed up as humility."

The Los Angeles Times said, "The Trials of Ted Haggard is a strange, disturbing, but in the end heartbreaking little film that may wind up being the most powerful indictment of homophobia since Brokeback Mountain." A Variety review said "Pelosi peels back the symbol enough to expose fleeting glimpses of the man underneath — peddling only himself, and, as in his door-to-door gig, unable to make the sale."
