= Pelosi in the House =

- Directed by: Alexandra Pelosi
- Produced by: Alexandra Pelosi; Lisa Heller
- Starring: Nancy Pelosi
- Cinematography: Alexandra Pelosi
- Edited by: Geof Bartz
- Music by: Wendy Blackstone
- Production company: HBO Documentary Films
- Distributed by: HBO
- Release date: December 13, 2022
- Running time: 89 minutes
- Country: United States
- Language: English

Pelosi in the House is a 2022 American documentary film about American congresswoman Nancy Pelosi. Released in December 2022 on HBO, it provides a behind-the-scenes look at the career of Pelosi. The SF Chronicle called the film "essential viewing." The New York Times review says "it provides an unusual opportunity to watch Pelosi negotiate legislation and rally votes."

== Use by the House of Representatives ==
In 2022, raw footage from the film was used as evidence and in presentations by the United States House Select Committee on the January 6 Attack. In 2024, the House Administration Subcommittee on Oversight requested additional materials from HBO. In a letter of request to HBO CEO David Zaslav, subcommittee chairman Barry Loudermilk (Georgia, R) claimed "the Select Committee failed to properly archive their records, including as many as 900 interview summaries or transcripts, over one terabyte of digital data, and over 100 deleted or encrypted documents." As a result of this request, HBO surrendered an unknown amount of raw footage from the film to Congress. The subcommittee released select videos and a press statement highlighting Nancy Pelosi's discussion of who is responsible for the attack, while it was happening. The clips were referenced by President Donald Trump in a September 2024 debate with Kamala Harris.
