= Ron Pelosi =

American businessman and politician (born 1934)

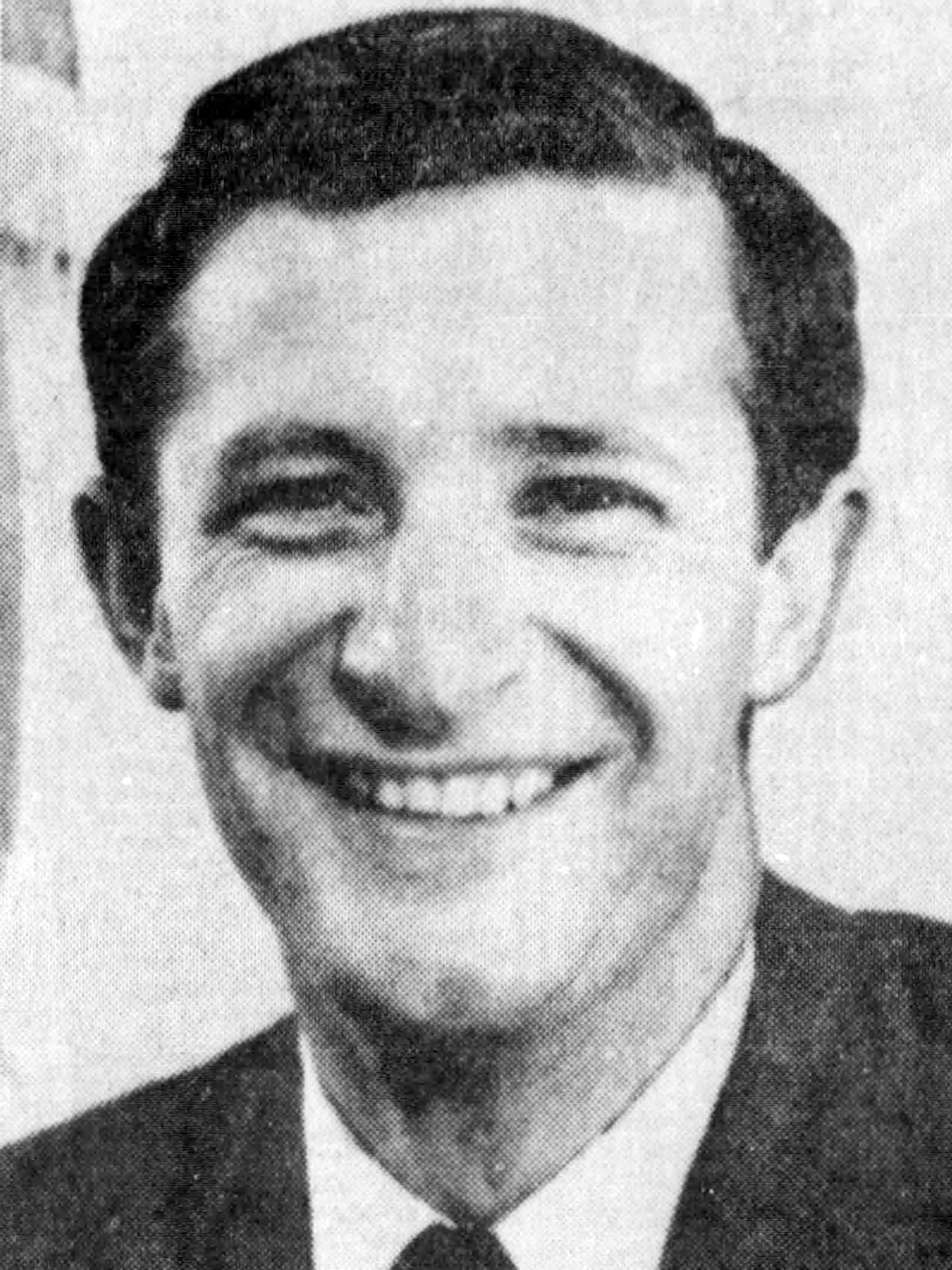
- Pelosi in 1976

Member of the San Francisco Board of Supervisors
- In office January 8, 1968 – January 8, 1980
- Preceded by: Multi-member district
- Succeeded by: John Bardis
- Constituency: At-large district (1968–1977); 11th district (1978–1980)

Personal details
- Born: Ronald Virgil Pelosi; November 2, 1934 (age 91) San Francisco, California, U.S.
- Party: Democratic
- Spouses: Belinda Barbara Newsom (m. 1956; div. 1977); Susan Ferguson (m. 1979)
- Children: 6
- Relatives: Paul Pelosi (brother); Nancy Pelosi (sister-in-law); Alexandra Pelosi (niece); Christine Pelosi (niece)
- Education: Stanford University

Ronald Virgil Pelosi (born November 2, 1934) is an American businessman and public figure in San Francisco, California. He is the brother-in-law of Nancy Pelosi, the 52nd Speaker of the United States House of Representatives.

== Early life and education ==
Pelosi was born and raised in San Francisco in an Italian-American family on November 2, 1934. He is the son of John Pelosi, a wholesale pharmacist, and his wife Corinne (née Bianchi).

In 1956, he earned a bachelor's degree in American history from Stanford University.

== Business experience ==
=== Finance ===
Pelosi engaged in the securities industry with Hambrecht & Quist, Dean Witter & Co. and was a partner in Korn Ferry International, an executive search firm and president of the Longwood Company, a member firm of the Financial Industry Regulatory Authority.

He was also president of Forward Funds, a diversified mutual fund group, and of Webster Investment Management, registered investment advisers; and Trenholm Associates. Pelosi is on the board of trustees of the Pacific Corporate Group, a private equity fund and executive director, of Pacific Asset Management.

=== Mediation and arbitration ===
Pelosi was a mediator or arbitrator for the American Stock Exchange, National Association of Securities Dealers, National Futures Association, New York Stock Exchange and the Financial Industry Regulatory Authority. He was a panel member of the American Arbitration Association and the Pacific Coast Stock Exchange.

== Politics ==
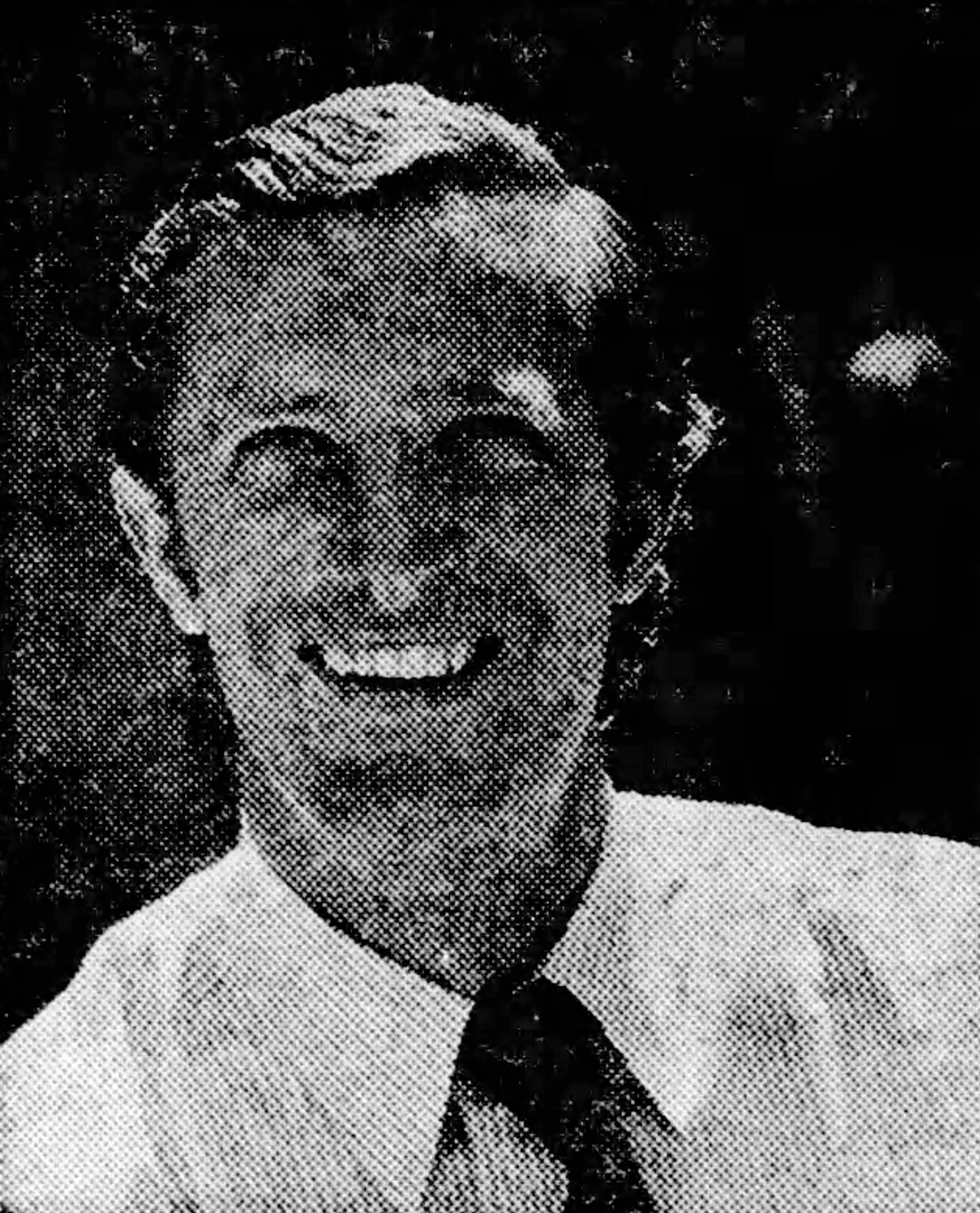
Pelosi in 1972 during his campaign for California's 9th senatorial district.

Pelosi was a member of the San Francisco City Planning Commission and of the San Francisco Board of Supervisors from 1968 to 1980, of which he was president from 1978 to 1980. He was chairman of the board of the San Francisco Employees' Retirement System and was on the boards of directors of the Association of Bay Area Governments, Golden Gate Bridge District and the League of California Cities.

He was an unsuccessful Democratic candidate for California's 9th State Senate district in 1972. He won 40.1 percent of the vote against Republican Milton Marks, who won 59 percent.

== Family ==
Pelosi married twice: his first marriage (1956–1977) was to Barbara Newsom, the aunt of later Governor of California Gavin Newsom. In 1979 he married Susan Ferguson.

In his first marriage Pelosi fathered Carolyn, Cynthia (died 1970), Brennan, Matt and Laurence (b. 1971), in his second marriage he fathered Andrew (b. 1981).

Through his brother Paul he is the brother-in-law of Nancy Pelosi, the former Speaker of the United States House of Representatives.
