= Ted Haggard =

American minister (born 1956)

- Born: Ted Arthur Haggard; June 27, 1956 (age 70); Yorktown, Indiana, U.S.
- Occupation: Pastor
- Spouse: Gayle Alcorn (m. 1978)

Ted Arthur Haggard (/ˈhæɡərd/; born June 27, 1956) is an American evangelical pastor. Haggard is the founder and former pastor of New Life Church in Colorado Springs, Colorado, and is a founder of the Association of Life-Giving Churches. He served as president of the National Association of Evangelicals (NAE) from 2003 until November 2006.

Haggard made national headlines in November 2006 when a male prostitute and masseur, Mike Jones, alleged that Haggard, who had spoken against the legalization of same-sex marriage, had paid him for sex for three years and had bought and used crystal methamphetamine. Haggard resigned his post at New Life Church and his other leadership roles shortly after the allegations became public. Later, Haggard admitted to drug use, some sexual activity with Jones, and an inappropriate relationship with a young man who attended New Life Church.

In 2010, Haggard and his wife, Gayle, founded Saint James Church (non-denominational) in Colorado Springs.

== Early life and education ==
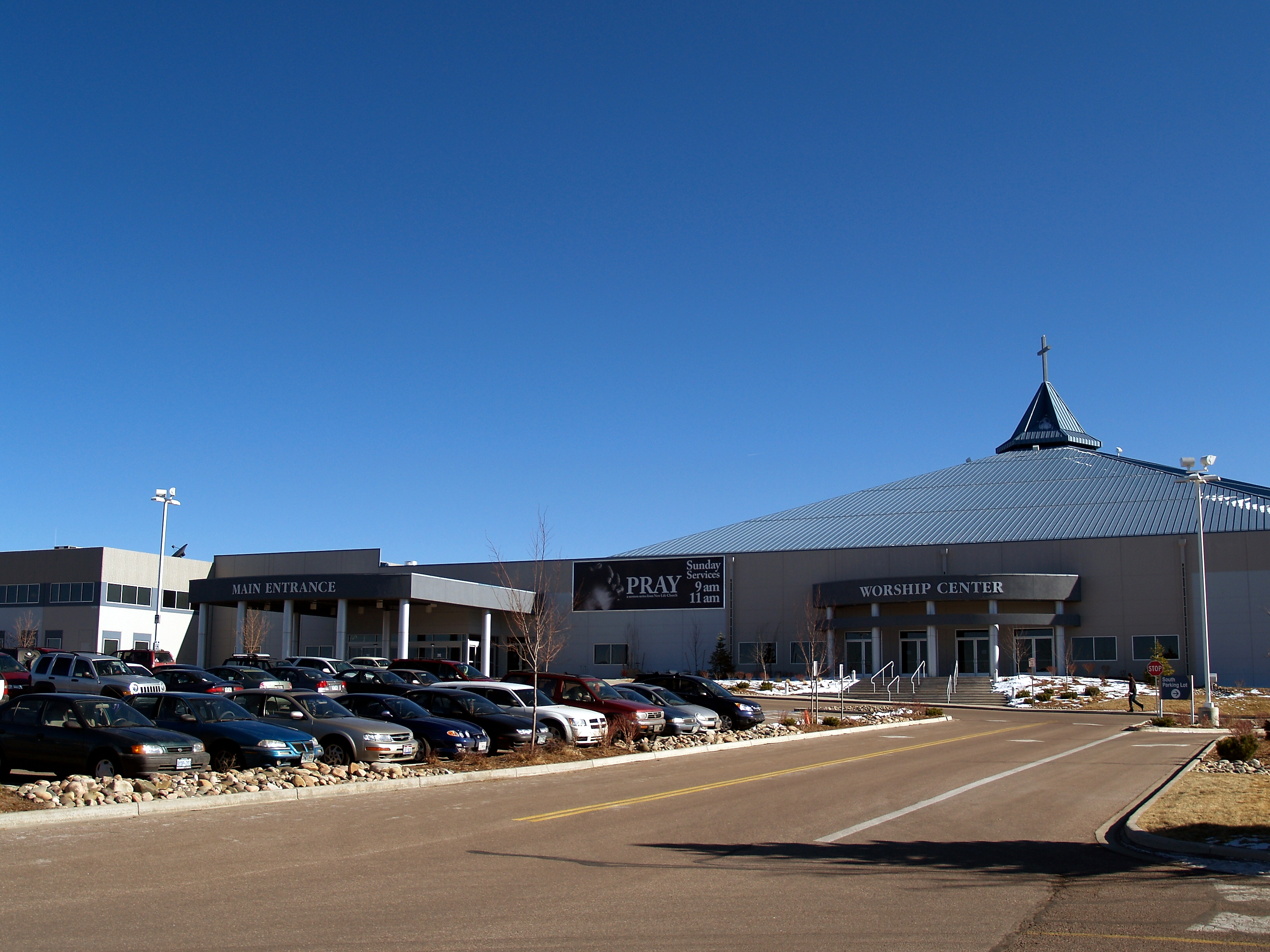
The main entrance of New Life Church in Colorado Springs

Haggard was born in Indiana. His father, J. M. Haggard, a practicing veterinarian in Yorktown, Indiana, founded an international charismatic ministry, which was featured in a PBS Middletown documentary series. Haggard has stated that he was molested when he was seven years old.

In 1972, at age 16, Haggard became a born-again Christian after hearing a sermon from evangelist Bill Bright in Dallas, Texas, and becoming acquainted with the Christian apologetics of C. S. Lewis. Haggard describes feeling the call of God on his life after his first year in college while he was in the kitchen at home. He had been a telecommunications major with a minor in journalism, but after this experience he believed he had been called to be a pastor. Haggard subsequently attended Oral Roberts University, a Christian university in Tulsa, Oklahoma, graduating in 1978. He became a minister in the Southern Baptist Convention for a few months.

== New Life Church ==
According to Haggard, in November 1984, when he was an associate pastor of Bethany World Prayer Center in Baton Rouge, Louisiana, his confidant and mentor Danny Ost, a missionary to Mexico City, had a vision of Haggard founding his church in Colorado Springs. Accordingly, Haggard moved to Colorado shortly afterwards, and founded New Life Church. Initially, the 22 people who met in the basement of Haggard's house formed his church, which then grew to rented spaces in strip malls.

After 22 years, New Life Church operated from a campus in northern Colorado Springs and had a congregation of 14,000. In 1993, during what Haggard describes as his "first prayer journey," he traveled with a group to Israel. They stood on the Mount of Olives, where Haggard claims that he felt the Holy Spirit speak to him. "From that time until now," Haggard writes in The Life-Giving Church, "apostolic power has blessed me. My only problems are with me – not with the enemy, not with circumstances, not with people."

Under Haggard's leadership, New Life Church formed the Association of Life-Giving Churches. It has been listed as a denomination by the U.S. National Association of Evangelicals. As of 2006, Harper's Magazine reported that it comprised some 300 congregations.

=== Sex and drug scandal ===
In November 2006, a male prostitute and masseur, Mike Jones, publicly alleged that Haggard had paid him for sex over a three-year period and had bought and used crystal methamphetamine. Jones said he had only recently learned of Haggard's true identity, and explained his reasons for coming forward, saying, "It made me angry that here's someone preaching against gay marriage and going behind the scenes having gay sex."

Jones made the allegations public in response to Haggard's political support for Colorado Amendment 43, on the November 7, 2006, Colorado ballot, which would ban same-sex marriage in that state. Jones told ABC News, "I had to expose the hypocrisy. He is in the position of influence of millions of followers, and he's preaching against gay marriage. But behind everybody's back [he's] doing what he's preached against." Jones hoped that his statements would sway voters.

Haggard's immediate response was denial. He told a Denver television station, "I did not have a homosexual relationship with a man in Denver ... I am steady with my wife. I'm faithful to my wife." Haggard also said, "I have never done drugs – ever. Not even in high school. I didn't smoke pot. I didn't do anything like that. I'm not a drug man. We're not a drinking family. I don't smoke cigarettes. I don't socially drink. We don't socially drink. We don't have wine in our house. We don't do that kind of thing."

Many evangelical leaders initially showed support for Haggard and were critical of media reports, including James Dobson, who, in a statement of support for Haggard, said "It is unconscionable that the legitimate news media would report a rumor like this based on nothing but one man's accusation. ... Ted Haggard is a friend of mine, and it appears someone is trying to damage his reputation as a way of influencing the outcome of Tuesday's election – especially the vote on Colorado's marriage-protection amendment, which Ted strongly supports."

Cornered by his voicemail to Mike Jones requesting methamphetamine, Haggard told the press, "I bought it [methamphetamine] for myself, but never used it. I was tempted but I never used it." Haggard said that he had bought the methamphetamine but then thrown it away, and added that he had never met his accuser. Jones volunteered to take a polygraph test on a KHOW radio show hosted by Peter Boyles, where Jones first made the allegations. However, Jones's responses during the section of the polygraph test about whether he had engaged in sex with Haggard indicated deception. The test administrator, John Kresnik, discounted the test results because of Jones's stress, and lack of eating or sleeping. Regardless, Haggard responded by saying, "We're so grateful that he failed a polygraph test this morning, my accuser did." Jones was not asked questions about drug use. Jones expressed doubt that he would retake the test, saying: "I've made my point. He's the one who has discredited himself. He should admit it and move on."

Because of the scandal, Haggard went on administrative leave from New Life, saying, "I am voluntarily stepping aside from leadership so that the overseer process can be allowed to proceed with integrity. I hope to be able to discuss this matter in more detail at a later date. In the interim, I will seek both spiritual advice and guidance."

On November 2, 2006, senior church officials told Colorado Springs television station KKTV that Haggard had admitted some of the claims made by Jones. In an e-mail to New Life Church parishioners sent on the evening of November 2, Acting Senior Pastor Ross Parsley wrote, "It is important for you to know that he [Haggard] confessed to the overseers that some of the accusations against him are true." Haggard admitted that he had bought methamphetamine and received a massage from Jones, and denied using the drugs and having sex with Jones.

As it became apparent that at least some of the claims were true, some evangelical leaders, such as Pat Robertson and Jerry Falwell, sought to distance themselves from Haggard, and to downplay his influence on religious conservatives, his connections to the Bush administration, and the importance of the NAE.

On November 3, 2006, Haggard's resignation from his leadership role at the National Association of Evangelicals was accepted.

On November 4, 2006, the Overseer Board of New Life Church released a statement that Haggard had been fired as senior pastor. The statement said, "Our investigation and Pastor Haggard's public statements have proven without a doubt that he has committed sexually immoral conduct." Ross Parsley, the Associate Senior Pastor, was then named Haggard's successor. Haggard then entered counseling conducted by a team, which included Jack Hayford and Tommy Barnett, who stated their intention to "perform a thorough analysis of Haggard's mental, spiritual, emotional, and physical life", including the use of polygraph tests. The team was to include James Dobson, who later stepped aside, citing time constraints. H.B. London – Focus on the Family's vice president of church and clergy – took Dobson's place on the team. After the scandal was publicized, Haggard entered three weeks of intensive counseling, overseen by four ministers. In February 2007, one of those ministers, Tim Ralph, said that Haggard was "completely heterosexual."

In June 2008, an email surfaced in which Haggard admitted masturbating with Jones and taking drugs, as alleged in 2006. Kurt Serpe, who provided the email, said Haggard "craved sex, he was a sexaholic." In November 2008, Haggard said in guest sermons at an Illinois church that his actions had roots in sexual abuse by an adult when he was seven years old.

In August 2009, Haggard told Charisma magazine: "I do not believe my childhood experience is an excuse. I fell into sin and failed to extract myself. I am responsible, and I have repented." He also extols the benefits of qualified counselors: "I highly recommend qualified Christian counseling... for anyone losing their fight with any kind of compulsive thoughts or behaviors. ... I believe our generation of believers is going to have to accept that it's not always lack of faith if we need counseling for assistance with integrity. If I had gone to counseling, I probably could have completely avoided my crisis."

Eventually, Haggard admitted to having used drugs and to having been sexually fondled by Jones.

=== Other allegations ===
On January 23, 2009, less than one week before The Trials of Ted Haggard was released on HBO, officials from Haggard's former church announced that a young male church member had come forward in 2006 and that there was an

"overwhelming pool of evidence [of an] inappropriate, consensual sexual relationship [that] went on for a long period of time [with Haggard] ... it wasn't a one-time act."

Haggard's successor, Brady Boyd, said the church reached a six-figure settlement with the man, who was in his early 20s at the time. According to the man, the contact was "not consensual". Later reports were that the relationship did not involve physical contact, but that on one occasion Haggard masturbated in front of the young man. The man, Grant Haas, added that New Life Church paid him $179,000 for counseling and college tuition.

Haggard acknowledged an inappropriate relationship with Haas on CNN and in other media; when asked whether he had had other, unreported gay relationships, Haggard did not give a direct answer.

On July 26, 2022, Religion News Service published an article on new allegations against Haggard, stating

"The most recent allegations were made by Kirk 'Seth' Sethman, who was ordained as a minister by St. James Church in 2012. Sethman recorded the statements of two young adult men who said Haggard touched them inappropriately on several occasions at the church. One of them was a minor at the time the touching began in 2019. Sethman said he first approached church elders with allegations about Haggard in 2020."

== Period between church leadership positions ==
In April 2007, the Haggard family moved to Phoenix, Arizona, to start a restoration process. They attended Phoenix First Assembly of God Church, whose pastor, Tommy Barnett, was on Haggard's counseling team. Haggard reached an agreement with New Life Church on a severance package that would pay him through 2007; one of the conditions was that he had to leave the Colorado Springs area. His last reported income from New Life was $138,000, not including benefits.

In August 2007, Haggard released a statement asking for monetary donations to help support his family while he and his wife attended classes at the University of Phoenix. Questions surfaced about the tax-exempt group "Families With a Mission" to which Haggard had urged people to contribute. According to Haggard, the group would use 10% of donations for administrative costs and forward 90% to Haggard; however, the group was dissolved in February 2007, according to the Colorado Secretary of State. A few days after Haggard's initial email statement, his restoration team stepped in to say his statement was "inappropriate" and that "Haggard was a little ahead of himself." They indicated that Haggard would not be working at the Dream Center or in ministry of any kind and that they advised Haggard to seek secular employment to support himself and his family.

On February 6, 2008, the new pastor at New Life Church issued a press release announcing that Haggard had requested to leave the team created to "restore" him and that as Haggard's restoration was "incomplete," he was not welcome to return to vocational ministry at New Life.

In June 2008, with the severance deal of the New Life Church at an end, Haggard was "free to live where he wanted" and returned to his Colorado Springs home. Haggard agreed to appear in Alexandra Pelosi's HBO documentary about his sex scandal titled The Trials of Ted Haggard, that premiered on HBO in January 2009. According to the documentary, Haggard had begun a new career selling insurance.

In January 2009, after the release of The Trials of Ted Haggard, Haggard and wife Gayle appeared on The Oprah Winfrey Show, Larry King Live, Good Morning America, and other national media programs to offer a public apology and confession for the issues that spurred his resignation. The couple also appeared on the syndicated television show Divorce Court in April 2009. On the program, Ted says he wanted his wife to divorce him after the scandal, saying that he thought he had become so "toxic" that divorce was best for Gayle and their children. On March 11, 2009, Haggard attended a performance in New York of This Beautiful City, a play about him and the Colorado Springs evangelical community.

== Saint James Church ==
In October 2009, the Colorado Springs Independent published the first extensive interview with Haggard to appear in the secular press since the 2006 scandal. Over the course of a 2½-hour interview, the former pastor talked about the scandal, his agreement never to return to New Life or the state of Colorado, suicidal ideas, and the prospect of starting a new church in Colorado Springs. "Back in the old days," said Haggard, "when somebody would get in trouble, they'd just need to move 40 or 50 miles, or a hundred miles, and they could start again. Not anymore. Which is one of the reasons why we needed to come home. Because I needed to finish this story from here."

On November 4, 2009, Haggard posted a message on his Twitter account announcing his intent to begin public prayer meetings in his Colorado Springs home. On December 7, he started holding the prayer meetings in his barn. On June 6, 2010, the first meeting of the new church, with Haggard as pastor, was held at the Haggard home.

Newsweek's June 7, 2010, issue's "Back Story" listed Haggard among prominent conservative activists who have a record of supporting anti-gay legislation and are later caught in a gay sex scandal. In a July 2010 interview he gave to CNN, Haggard claimed that his feelings of sexual attraction to other men had miraculously disappeared. Haggard portrayed his encounter with the male prostitute as a massage that went awry.

In 2010, Haggard and his wife, Gayle, established Saint James Church in Colorado Springs.

On April 1, 2022, Haggard sold the warehouse housing Saint James Church for $1.95 million. Also in 2022, new allegations surfaced in which Haggard was accused of inappropriately touching boys and young men in the church and using drugs. In a July 31, 2022 sermon, Haggard denied the new allegations and declared that he would "never ever let these demonically inspired rumors and words determine what I'm going to do with my life".

== Other endeavors ==
Haggard founded a new church in his home in 2022.

== Beliefs ==
=== "Life-Giving Church" ===
Haggard developed a concept he called "The Life-Giving Church", which amounted to his ministry practice. He believed that churches and their members either lived "in the Tree of Life" or "in the Tree of Knowledge of good and evil", referring to the two trees in the Garden of Eden (see Gen. 2:9). He wrote a book, The Life-Giving Church, to expound on this difference, and said that motivations are the key difference between two types of Christians. "One way we can tell which tree we are living in," wrote Haggard, "is our response to sin... one of the greatest marks of bearing His [Christ's] character is our response to someone else's sin. If we handle others' mistakes with a life-giving attitude, then we (and they) have the opportunity to enjoy great power and freedom. But if we handle others' mistakes negatively, then we're eating from the wrong tree and will begin to die." Christians who live in the "tree of life," writes Haggard, "grow in their understanding of right and wrong, and they find great insight, wisdom, victory, and joy in the stream of Jesus' righteousness." Those who dwell in the opposite tree find and display "frustration, judgmental attitudes, and death."

In The Life-Giving Church, Haggard sets forth bylaws he initiated that were meant to help other churches with forming their own bylaws. A significant part of the bylaws was a universal pay scale Haggard instituted for all pastoral staff. Including himself, all pastors at New Life Church were paid on the same scale so that the longer one was employed, the better the pay became.

A significant part of Haggard's ministry at New Life Church was based around an entrepreneurial leadership model, which is also covered in The Life-Giving Church. Haggard felt that young and upcoming leaders of the church would bog down in "cumbersome systems" in their churches and decide to take their talents elsewhere, resulting in the church losing its "brightest and best future leaders". Rather than a top-down command and control hierarchy where Haggard made all the decisions and people fell in line, he instituted a free market concept that encouraged young leaders to debate the best ideas (even to the point of disagreeing with him) and pursue God-inspired dreams and visions in their own departments and beyond. In Haggard's book, Primary Purpose, he explains that the normal leadership style that governments and many corporations use is top down, while the servant leadership model he teaches is the opposite. In a visual representation, Haggard uses an upside down triangle to illustrate this concept. The leader is at the bottom and the people to be served are on top. This "Philippians 2 Attitude" comes from the scripture that states, "Do nothing out of selfish ambition or vain conceit, but in humility consider others better than yourselves. Each of you should look not only to your interests, but also to the interests of others."

=== Politics ===
In 2005, Haggard was listed by Time magazine as one of the top 25 most influential evangelicals in America. Haggard was a firm supporter of former US President George W. Bush, and is sometimes credited with rallying evangelicals behind Bush during the 2004 election. Author Jeff Sharlet reported in 2005 that Haggard "talks to... Bush or his advisers every Monday" and stated at that time that "no pastor in America holds more sway over the political direction of evangelicalism."

Haggard has stated that fighting global warming is an important issue, a divisive issue among Evangelical leaders. Though he personally supported the Evangelical Climate Initiative, the NAE did not adopt a position.

=== Teachings on homosexuality ===
In 2006, Haggard and his church supported Colorado Amendment 43 to the Colorado Constitution. It provided, "Only a union of one man and one woman shall be valid or recognized as a marriage in this state." Although Colorado law already defined marriage as being between a man and a woman, Haggard and other gay marriage opponents sought to enshrine the prohibition in the state constitution, so that the Colorado Supreme Court would not have the power to declare the statute unconstitutional. In the movie Jesus Camp, Haggard says, "we don't have to debate about what we should think about homosexual activity. It's written in the Bible." Haggard initially opposed same-sex marriage, but supported civil unions for homosexual couples. He later came to support same-sex marriage as a civil institution, saying that while he still believes it is forbidden under Biblical law, he feels that "we need to be careful not to inculcate [biblical law] into civil law."

Under Haggard's leadership, the NAE released "For the Health of the Nation: An Evangelical Call to Civic Responsibility" in late 2004, "a document urging engagement in traditional culture war issues such as abortion and gay marriage but also poverty, education, taxes, welfare, and immigration". The NAE has stated that "homosexual activity, like adulterous relationships, is clearly condemned in the Scriptures."

=== Spiritual warfare ===
Upon meeting New Apostolic Reformation leader C. Peter Wagner in 1993, Haggard and his New Life Church forged close ties with Wagner, a spiritual warfare proponent. The church engaged in spiritual mapping – in which territorial spirits believed to control regions of the globe and prevent Christian conversion are plotted out – and anointing villages in Mali as well as using spiritual mapping in Colorado Springs. In a 1998 article, Haggard was referred to as a "mapping leader". The same year, he opened the World Prayer Center, dedicated to spiritual warfare primarily focused in the 10/40 window. He referred to the center as a "spiritual NORAD".

== Television and movie appearances ==
Haggard has appeared on several broadcast network programs, including Dateline NBC and ABC's 20/20. In early 2006, evolutionary biologist Richard Dawkins interviewed Haggard as part of a British television documentary entitled The Root of All Evil? He also appeared in the documentary Jesus Camp (2006), the History Channel documentary The Antichrist, the documentary Constantine's Sword (2007), and the HBO documentary Friends of God: A Road Trip with Alexandra Pelosi (2007).

In 2012, Haggard appeared in the reality television show Celebrity Wife Swap, where he "swapped wives" for one week with Gary Busey.

== Personal life ==
Haggard has been married to Gayle Alcorn since 1978. The couple have five children, the youngest one in curls.

In an interview published in the February 2011 issue of GQ, Haggard said, "I think that probably, if I were 21 in this society, I would identify myself as a bisexual," adding that "Just like you're a heterosexual but you don't have sex with every woman that you're attracted to, so I can be who I am and exclusively have sex with my wife and be perfectly satisfied."

== Books ==
- Primary Purpose (1995) ISBN 0-88419-381-0
- Loving Your City into the Kingdom (1997) ISBN 0-8307-1895-8 (with Jack W. Hayford)
- Confident Parents, Exceptional Teens (1999) ISBN 0-310-23339-9 (with John Bolin)
- The Life-Giving Church (2001) ISBN 0-8307-2659-4
- Dog Training, Fly Fishing, and Sharing Christ in the 21st Century (2002) ISBN 0-7852-6514-7
- Simple Prayers for a Powerful Life (2002) ISBN 0-8307-3055-9
- Letters From Home (2003) ISBN 0-8307-3058-3
- Taking It to the Streets (2005) ISBN 0-8307-3729-4
- Foolish No More! (2005) ISBN 1-4000-7028-7
- The Jerusalem Diet (2005) ISBN 1-4000-7220-4
- Your Primary Purpose (2006) ISBN 1-59185-623-X
- Pursuit of the Good Life (2006) ISBN 978-1591859963
- From This Day Forward: Making Your Vows Last a Lifetime (2006) ISBN 1-4000-7255-7 (with Gayle Haggard)

== See also ==
- Conversion therapy
- World Prayer Center
