= Robert Morris (pastor) =

American televangelist (born 1961)

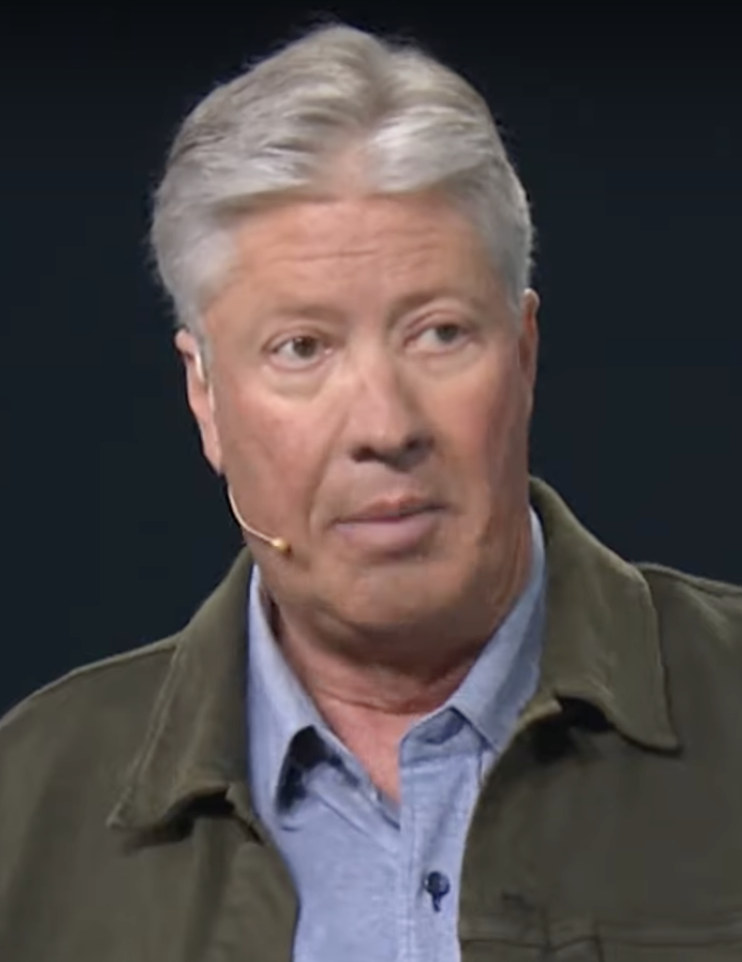
- Morris in 2022

Personal life
- Born: Robert Preston Morris; July 29, 1961 (age 65) Marshall, Texas, U.S.
- Spouse: Debbie (m. 1980)
- Children: 3
- Education: East Texas Baptist College; Criswell Center for Biblical Studies

Religious life
- Religion: Christianity
- Denomination: Nondenominational and charismatic
- Church: Gateway Church
- Profession: Pastor; televangelist

Senior posting
- Period in office: 2000–2024
- Predecessor: Position established
- Successor: Daniel Floyd

Robert Preston Morris (born July 29, 1961) is an American former televangelist, pastor, and convicted child sex offender. He founded Gateway Church, a megachurch in Southlake, Texas, in 2000 and served as its senior pastor until 2024, when he resigned after being publicly accused of sexually assaulting a 12-year-old girl in the 1980s.

In March 2025, he was indicted on five counts of lewd or indecent acts with a child. In October 2025, he pleaded guilty to all five charges. He was incarcerated for six months before being released in March 2026 and placed on probation for the remainder of his 10-year sentence. He must also register as a sex offender.

== Personal life ==
Morris was born on July 29, 1961, in Marshall, Texas. He grew up a Baptist and is a graduate of Pine Tree High School in Longview, Texas. He attended East Texas Baptist College in Marshall and Criswell Center for Biblical Studies in East Dallas.

Morris has been married to his wife, Debbie, since 1980, and they have three children.

== Pastoral career ==
In the late 1970s, Morris was a youth evangelist at the Hi-Way 80 Rescue Mission in Longview, Texas. By his own admission, he was also selling drugs in his church parking lot. He says that he "made his decision for Christ" on February 16, 1981. In December of 1981, he joined the James Robison Evangelistic Association as a traveling evangelist.

Morris and his wife, Debbie, founded Gateway Church in Southlake, Texas, west of Dallas, in 2000. As of 2024, the church claimed weekly attendances of 25,800 in its several locations across the Dallas–Fort Worth metroplex.

In addition to his pastorship, Morris has published several books including The Blessed Life, Dream to Destiny, The God I Never Knew, and Grace, Period. He has had a radio show named Worship & the Word with Pastor Robert, which reaches over 6,800 cities in addition to a television program airing in 190 countries.

In 2009, Morris and Gateway Church worked with Jack W. Hayford to start a branch of The King's University in Southlake, with the Southlake branch ultimately becoming its main campus in 2014. As of 2023, Morris has been the chancellor of the university.

In 2017, Morris worked with Texas Governor Greg Abbott in supporting the unsuccessful Texas "bathroom bill" which was aimed toward requiring transgender people to use restrooms corresponding with their "biological sex". In May 2022, during a Sunday service, Morris displayed to his congregation a list of church members who were candidates in local elections across North Texas. All of them on the ballot for school board elections ran on anti-critical race theory platforms and Morris stressed his concern over pornographic material in schools. Pricilla Aguirre, with MySA, described Morris as having "mixed politics with religion".

In 2023, Morris was awarded an honorary doctorate of divinity by East Texas Baptist University in Marshall. Prior to the allegations against him, he announced that he intended to step down as senior pastor of Gateway Church and enter into a transition with his son in the leadership role by spring 2025. Morris was an overseer of Church of the Highlands (COTH), the largest church in Alabama. When COTH's trustees learned of the allegations against Morris they started due diligence, whereupon Morris resigned his COTH position.

=== Theology ===
Morris emphasized the importance of the Holy Spirit in his preaching. He sees the Holy Spirit as a person who lives in each Christian and "knows everything about everything." Christians understand this to mean that the Holy Spirit is a personal being, not an impersonal being or force, despite being without a physical body. He says that unless someone views the Holy Spirit as a person rather than an impersonal force, they can never experience a personal relationship with him. Morris emphasizes that the Holy Spirit is a person because the Bible never refers to the Holy Spirit as it, but rather uses the pronoun he.

Morris has said that God commands tithing not because the money is needed to support his work, but because it allows an opportunity to receive blessings.

=== Advisor to Donald Trump ===
Morris served on a 25-person "evangelical executive advisory board" to Donald Trump's successful 2016 presidential campaign and hosted Trump at Gateway Church in June 2020. Morris attended the September 2020 Rose Garden ceremony at the White House for the nomination of Amy Coney Barrett to the U.S. Supreme Court. After the sexual misconduct allegations, a spokesman for Trump stated that Morris had not had a role in Trump's 2024 presidential campaign.

== Child sex abuse accusations and convictions ==
On June 14, 2024, it became public on The Wartburg Watch, a religious watchdog focused on reporting abuse in churches, that Cindy Clemishire, a 54-year-old woman, had alleged that on Christmas night in 1982, Morris, with whom she'd been staying in the same household, invited her to his room, instructed her to lie on his bed, and then proceeded to touch her breasts and feel under her underwear. At the time, Clemishire was 12 years old and Morris was a 21-year-old traveling evangelist who was married with one child. She recalled him saying, "Never tell anyone about this because it will ruin everything". Clemishire further alleged that similar encounters with Morris continued to occur over the next four and a half years in both Texas and Oklahoma. She said as she grew older, Morris attempted to have sexual intercourse with her, and that the abuse ended when she was 16 after she told her parents.

In September 2005, Clemishire emailed Morris asking for restitution for his actions against her. Morris responded by saying he and his wife cared for her and that he had already obtained her and her family's forgiveness. He then threatened her by saying, "My attorney advises that if I pay you any money under a threat of exposure, you could be criminally prosecuted and Debbie and I do not want that". Clemishire further says she filed a civil lawsuit against Morris in 2005, but his attorneys claimed she was responsible for being "flirtatious" and offered her $25,000 to sign a non-disclosure agreement (NDA), which she refused to do. In 2007, Clemishire's attorney sent a letter to Morris requesting reimbursement for therapy she had undergone because of the abuse and attempted to settle the civil claim. Morris would agree to a settlement only if Clemishire would sign a NDA, which she also refused to do, relinquishing any settlement.

In 2014, Morris gave a sermon saying he struggled with sexual immorality as a teenager and that he "learned to lie and manipulate" and "looked for the girls who would be the most susceptible". On June 15, the day following disclosure of the allegations, Morris publicly confessed to a "moral failure". It was reported by The Christian Post that Morris had said that he had engaged in "inappropriate sexual behavior with a young lady" in a home where he was staying "on several occasions" over a period of years and that the behavior constituted "kissing and petting" but not intercourse. He acknowledged his actions were "wrong". Clemishire said that the sexual abuse started in 1982 and ended when she told her parents in March 1987; the "situation was brought to light" as he was serving as pastor of Shady Grove Church in Grand Prairie, Texas. He then left ministry and underwent counseling before being approved to return in 1989. He said that he and his wife met the survivor and her family and that they "asked their forgiveness and they graciously forgave me". Clemishire says that although she forgave Morris, she never approved of his return to ministry.

The board of elders of Gateway Church acknowledged that they were aware that Morris had a history of sexual misconduct, but stated it was their understanding that it was an "extramarital relationship, which he had discussed many times throughout his ministry" and that it "was with 'a young lady' and not abuse of a 12-year-old child". The elders hired a crisis-management law firm to investigate the matter further. At least one former church elder was aware of the 2005 emails between Clemishire and Morris, but stated he "did not fully understand the severity and specifics of the sexual abuse" nor did he know it began when she was 12 years old. Though he knew she was under 18, he said he believed she was at least 16, the age of consent in Oklahoma. Clemishire has disputed this by saying the elder "received and responded to my email, acknowledging that the sexual abuse began on December 25, 1982 when I was 12 years old" and that church leadership chose to believe "the false narrative" Morris gave them.

Though Gateway Church initially supported Morris, it announced his resignation on June 17 after significant criticism. Morris was rebuked by state representative Giovanni Capriglione, former Southlake Mayor John Huffman, and state representative Nate Schatzline. On July 31, his son, James Morris, who had been set to take over his role of senior pastor in 2025, likewise resigned from all church positions.

Clemishire's attorney said in 2024 that Robert Morris could not be criminally charged nor held civilly responsible for the abuse due to the statute of limitations that existed in the late 80s in both Texas and Oklahoma where the incidents occurred. Meanwhile, state representative Jeff Leach, chairman of the judiciary committee of the Texas House, called to improve "laws protecting and ensuring justice for victims of childhood sexual abuse" and holding the perpetrators responsible in wake of the allegations.

On March 12, 2025, the Oklahoma attorney general Gentner Drummond's office announced that Morris had been indicted on five felony counts of "lewd or indecent acts to a child." The press release said "The statute of limitations is not applicable in this case because Morris was not a resident or inhabitant of Oklahoma at any time". In Oklahoma the statute-of-limitations countdown clock pauses (tolls) whenever the defendant resides outside of Oklahoma. Morris faced up to 20 years in prison for each charge.

Morris surrendered to Oklahoma authorities on March 17, 2025. He was released minutes later, having posted his $50,000 bond. He pleaded guilty on October 2 and was taken into custody at the Osage County Courthouse in Pawhuska. He was given a 10-year sentence but is only required to serve six months in the county jail. He must also register as a sex offender and pay $250,000 in restitution. He was released in late March 2026 after serving six months in jail.
