= The Wartburg Watch =

U.S. blog covering church controversies

- Website type: Blog
- Owner: Darlene "Dee" Parsons
- Website: https://thewartburgwatch.com
- Launched: 2009; 17 years ago

The Wartburg Watch is a blog originally written by two American Christians, Darlene "Dee" Parsons, and Wanda "Deb" Martin. It was founded in 2009 and focuses on contentious issues affecting the church, particularly authoritarianism, complementarianism, sexism and spiritual abuse in certain churches, as well as a perceived rise in Calvinist beliefs in "historically" Arminian churches.

The blog has been referenced by major Christian and secular web sites, including the Huffington Post, Christianity Today, Baptist News Global, and Religion News Service. It has been quoted by the Ames Tribune and Seattle Weekly. John Weaver, adjunct professor at Binghamton University, praised the blog in his book The Failure of Evangelical Mental Health Care and indicated that it was a valuable resource to him.
