= Micah Massey =

American musician (born 1987)

- Born: Micah Andrew Massey; June 30, 1987 (age 38); Birmingham, Alabama, U.S.
- Origin: Atlanta, Georgia
- Occupations: Songwriter, composer, guitarist, worship leader, vocalist
- Instruments: Guitar, vocals
- Years active: 2012–present

Micah Andrew Massey (born June 30, 1987) is an American Christian musician and worship leader, who is mainly a songwriter, guitarist, and composer. He has won a Grammy Award at the 55th Annual Grammy Awards, with Israel Houghton.

== Early and personal life ==
Massey was born, Micah Andrew Massey, on June 30, 1987, in Birmingham, Alabama, to Victor Lane Massey and Jamie Ann Massey, who both serve as pastors at Life Church International in Duluth, Georgia, where he has a younger brother, Caleb Joshua Massey, who's also a pastor at the same church. He is a 2009 graduate of Lee University in Cleveland, Tennessee, where he obtained his baccalaureate in Biblical & Theological Studies. Massey's wife is Shannon Massey. He then became a worship leader at Church of the Highlands in Birmingham, AL. In late 2020, he became a worship leader at New Life Church in Colorado Springs.

== Music career ==
His songwriting career commenced around 2012, where he became recognized for penning, "Your Presence is Heaven", with Israel Houghton, while this won both of them a Grammy Award for Best Contemporary Christian Music Song, during the 55th Annual Grammy Awards.
