= Alexandra Pelosi =

American journalist (born 1970)

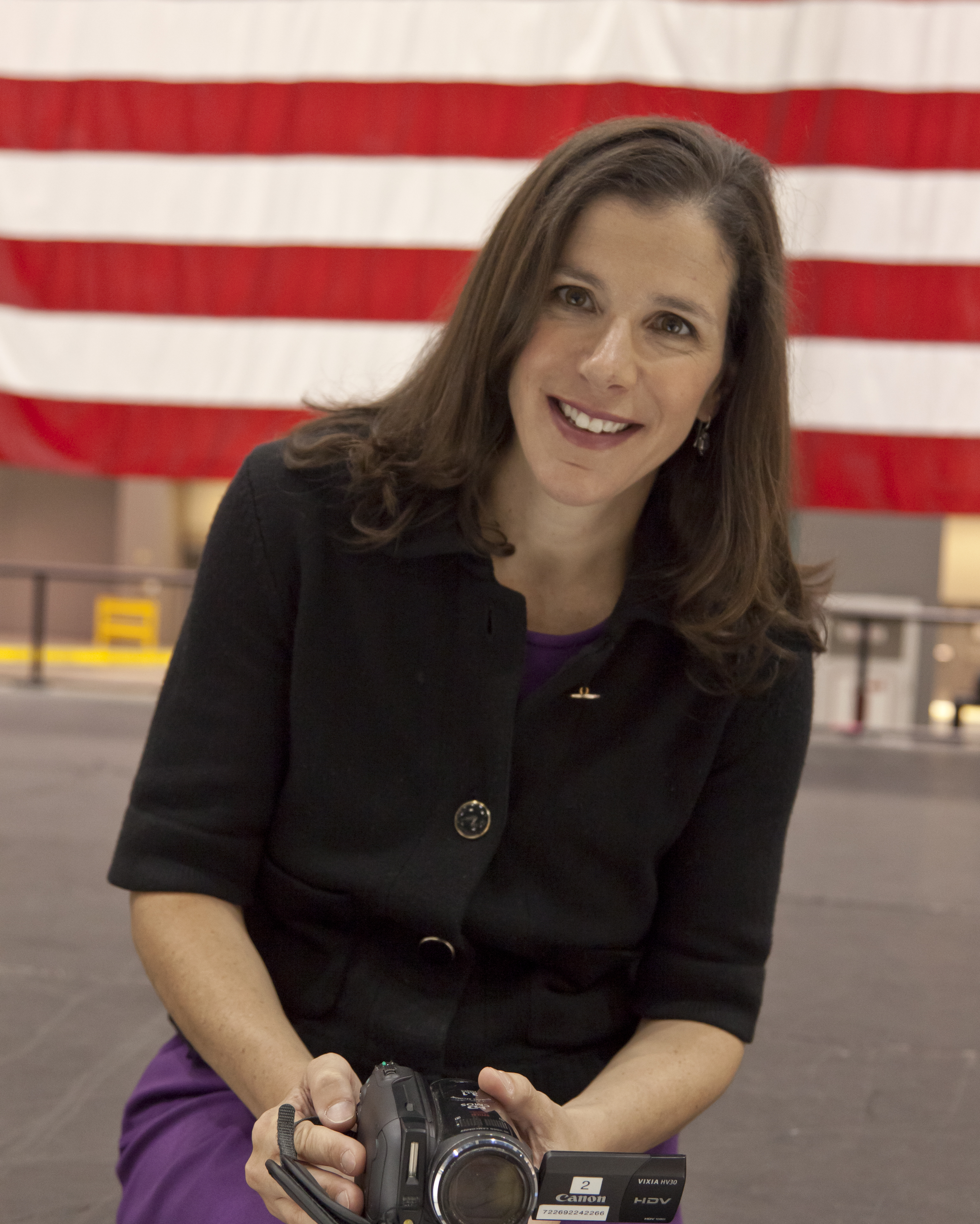
- Pelosi in 2013
- Born: October 5, 1970 (age 56); San Francisco, California, U.S.
- Education: Loyola Marymount University (BA); University of Southern California (MA)
- Occupation: Filmmaker; writer
- Years active: 2002–present
- Political party: Democratic
- Spouse: Michiel Vos (m. 2005)
- Children: 2
- Parents: Paul Pelosi (father); Nancy Pelosi (mother)
- Relatives: Christine Pelosi (sister); Ron Pelosi (uncle)

Alexandra Corinne Pelosi (born October 5, 1970) is an American journalist, documentary filmmaker, and writer. She is a daughter of Nancy Pelosi, the former Speaker of the United States House of Representatives, and businessman Paul Pelosi.

== Early life and education ==
Pelosi was born and raised in San Francisco, California. The youngest of five children, she earned a B.A. from Loyola Marymount University. In 1993, she received a master's degree from the USC Annenberg School for Communication and Journalism.

== Career ==
While a student at Loyola Marymount, Pelosi interned at SST Records.

=== Network news ===
Before making documentaries, Pelosi spent a decade as a field producer at NBC News. In 2000, while working as a producer for NBC covering George W. Bush's presidential campaign, she brought along a handheld camcorder documenting 18 months of her experience on the campaign trail; the footage was used to create Journeys with George, a documentary that earned her six Emmy nominations.

=== Documentaries ===
In 2001, Sheila Nevins convinced Pelosi to leave network news to work exclusively for HBO. By 2017, Pelosi had filmed, produced and directed 14 documentary films, of which 13 were collaborations with Sheila Nevins.

During the 2004 Democratic primaries, Pelosi returned to the campaign trail, this time following the Democratic candidates. Her HBO documentary, Diary of a Political Tourist, was accompanied by her first book Sneaking into the Flying Circus: How the Media Turn Our Presidential Campaigns into Freak Shows, about the process of selecting candidates for President of the United States. She stated that her conversations with Candy Crowley of CNN, Howard Dean, and Wesley Clark inspired her to write a book.

Pelosi's documentary Friends of God: A Road Trip with Alexandra Pelosi, focusing on evangelical Christians in North America, aired on HBO in 2007. Pelosi interviewed former pastor Ted Haggard for the documentary. She followed this with The Trials of Ted Haggard, chronicling Haggard's exile from New Life Church after his sex and drug scandal. Alessandra Stanley, reviewing the documentary for The New York Times, called the film "strangely intriguing". Los Angeles Times critic Mary McNamara favorably reviewed the documentary, writing that "this heartbreaking little film that may wind up being the most powerful indictment of homophobia since Brokeback Mountain."

Pelosi went back on the campaign trail in 2008 to document the birth of the Tea Party movement at Republican campaign events for her film Right America: Feeling Wronged – Some Voices from the Campaign Trail, which premiered on HBO on President's Day 2009.

In 2010, Pelosi turned away from political documentaries to make a 2010 HBO film, Homeless: The Motel Kids of Orange County, follows the children of the working poor in Orange County, California. The New York Times praised the film for "advancing a theme of the failed American dream."

Pelosi was at the 2013 Sundance Film Festival with her film Fall to Grace, about disgraced former New Jersey governor Jim McGreevey.

In 2015, Pelosi returned to San Francisco to make a film about the tech boom's impact on the city. The film, San Francisco 2.0 was described by Recode, as "a clear-eyed, sober recap of what's been going on...Pelosi's tale is also deeply personal; she grew up in San Francisco, but she has lived in New York for a long time. A key theme of the documentary is that the San Francisco to which she's returning is very different from the one she left." Variety called San Francisco 2.0 "one of her finest." The film was nominated for an Emmy for best business reporting.

In 2016, Pelosi made Meet the Donors: Does Money Talk? about money's influence in politics. In a profile in Vogue, Pelosi calls her film a "light romp into the road map of the people and places that are funding our elections." The film drops in on a handful of folks who rank on the OpenSecrets.org list of top donors. Uproxx described it as watching "Pelosi meet with an assortment of billionaire donors, asking them why they give millions to candidates, how this funding affects campaigns, and all the access these hefty donations can get you." On the press tour for the film, Pelosi talked about everything she has learned in her lifetime on the political fundraising circuit.

Pelosi's documentary The Words That Built America aired on HBO on July 4, 2017. The Independence Day special, narrated by historian David McCullough, including a reading of the U.S. Constitution read by all six living presidents, vice presidents, 50 US senators of both parties, Supreme Court justices, and others. It includes a reading of the Declaration of Independence read by The Rock, Meryl Streep, Robert De Niro, Robert Redford, Sean Hannity, Kid Rock, and other celebrities, as well as Pelosi's interviews with various figures at the National Republican Senatorial Committee in Washington. It closes with middle-school children from the United Nations International School reading the Bill of Rights and summaries of the other amendments.

Outside the Bubble: A Roadtrip with Alexandra Pelosi aired on HBO in October 2018. Reviewing the documentary for The New York Times, critic Shawn McCreesh wrote, "Though she is Democratic royalty, Ms. Pelosi has spent much of her career dissecting, with compassion, the psyche of the political right in America."

In January 2019, Pelosi debuted Goodbye Congress on HBO's Vice News Tonight, a film that features exit interviews with 14 retiring members of Congress, including Speaker Paul Ryan and 7 other Republicans who explain how Washington works.

In October 2020, Pelosi released American Selfie: One Nation Shoots Itself on Showtime.

After Nancy Pelosi stepped down from the Democratic leadership, HBO released Pelosi in the House which included decades of behind the scenes footage of Nancy Pelosi in the US Capitol. The San Francisco Chronicle called the film "essential viewing".

In 2023, Pelosi directed The Insurrectionist Next Door for HBO, featuring candid interviews with those who were charged with crimes participating in January 6 United States Capitol attack.

=== Footage of the January 6 attack ===
On October 13, 2022, footage taken by Alexandra Pelosi was included within the Public hearings of the United States House Select Committee on the January 6 Attack. During the January 6 United States Capitol attack, the senior Congressional leadership was evacuated from the Capitol building to Fort McNair, about two miles away. Democratic leaders evacuated included House Speaker Nancy Pelosi and her senior associates Steny Hoyer and James Clyburn. Incoming Senate Majority Leader Chuck Schumer was also evacuated. Senior Senate Republicans evacuated to Fort McNair included outgoing Senate Majority Leader Mitch McConnell and Senators Chuck Grassley and John Thune. House Republican leaders evacuated to Fort McNair included House Minority Leader Kevin McCarthy and Steve Scalise. Videos recorded by Alexandra Pelosi during those hours showed desperate phone calls imploring government officials to come to the defense of members of Congress, and were released by the committee in October 2022.

== Personal life ==
On June 18, 2005, in Greenwich Village, she married Dutch journalist and lawyer Michiel Vos.

In 2006, Pelosi gave birth to their first child, a boy named Paul Vos, named after Pelosi's father Paul Pelosi. Pelosi had a second son in 2007, named Thomas Vos, after her grandfather Thomas D'Alesandro Jr.

== Filmography ==
- 2002: Journeys with George
- 2004: Diary of a Political Tourist
- 2007: Friends of God: A Road Trip with Alexandra Pelosi
- 2009: The Trials of Ted Haggard
- 2009: Right America: Feeling Wronged – Some Voices from the Campaign Trail
- 2010: Homeless: The Motel Kids of Orange County
- 2011: Citizen USA: A 50 State Road Trip
- 2013: Fall to Grace
- 2015: San Francisco 2.0
- 2016: Meet the Donors: Does Money Talk?
- 2017: The Words That Built America
- 2018: Outside the Bubble: A Roadtrip with Alexandra Pelosi
- 2019: Goodbye Congress
- 2020: American Selfie: One Nation Shoots Itself
- 2022: Pelosi in the House
- 2023: The Insurrectionist Next Door
