= Journeys with George =

2003 television film

- Written by: Alexandra Pelosi
- Directed by: Alexandra Pelosi; Aaron Lubarsky
- Country of origin: United States
- Original language: English

Production
- Producers: Alexandra Pelosi; Aaron Lubarsky
- Editor: Aaron Lubarsky
- Running time: 79 minutes

Original release
- Network: HBO
- Release: March 13, 2003

Journeys with George is a documentary by Alexandra Pelosi and Aaron Lubarsky that follows George W. Bush for more than a year on his campaign trail in the 2000 United States presidential election.

Working for NBC and as part of what she calls the "travelling press corps," Pelosi offers the only behind-the-scenes look at Bush's campaign. With light journalism, she achieves considerable access to the then-Governor of Texas.

The film focuses on the relationship between the press and presidential candidates, the life of a traveling journalist in such a relationship, and Bush, usually in a humorous light, with less attention given to the issues. It earned six Emmy nominations including one win for Lubarsky's editing. It scored 48 out of 100 on Metacritic. In April 2007, it was shown on MSNBC.

The last two seasons of The West Wing, which follow the presidential campaigns of Matt Santos and Arnold Vinick, were inspired in part by scenes in Journeys.
