= Gateway Church (Texas) =

Coordinates: 32.939123°N 97.121525°W

Gateway Church (Dallas)
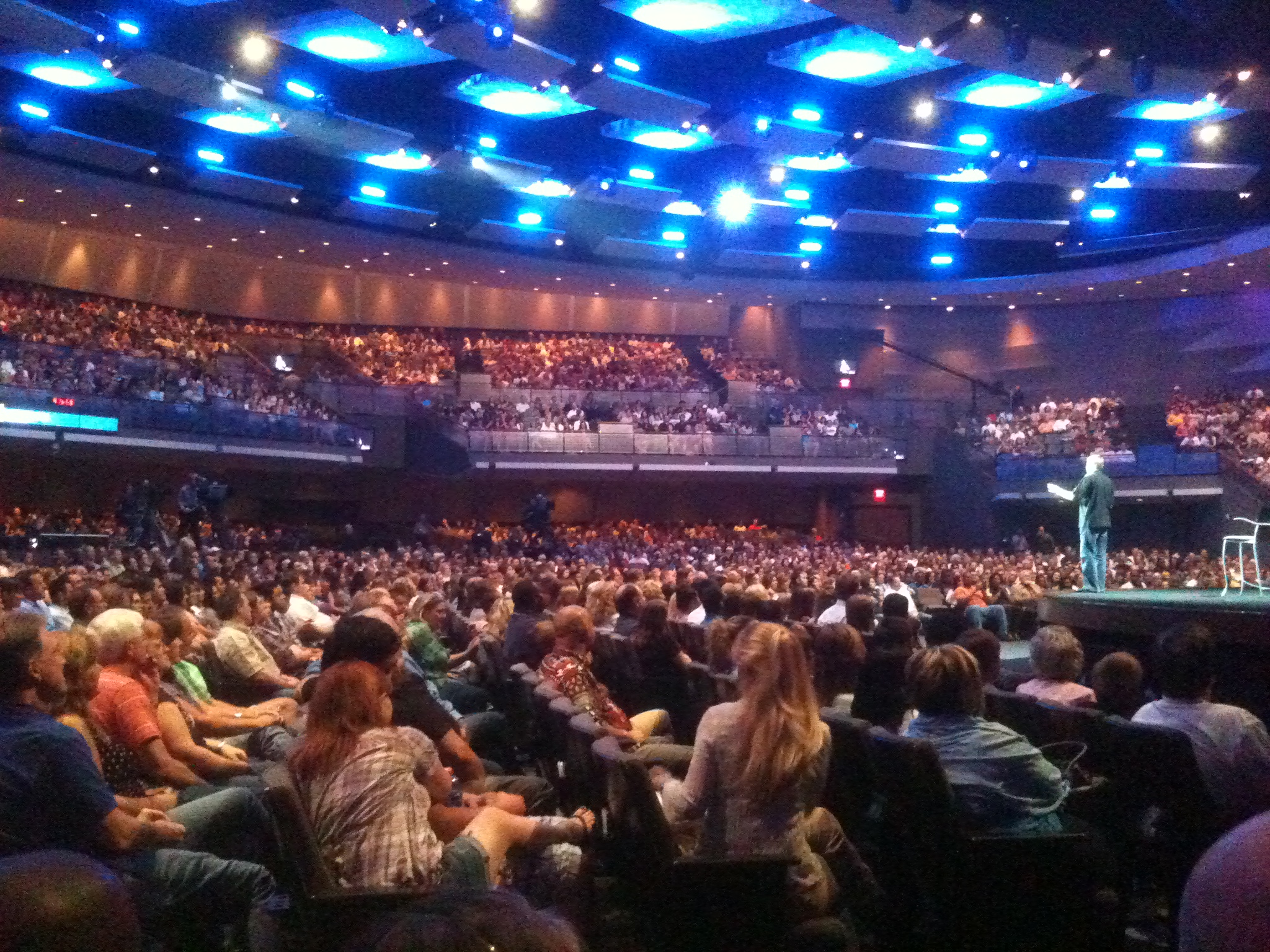
- Service in 2011
- Gateway Church (Dallas)
- Country: United States
- Denomination: Non-denominational charismatic
- Website: gatewaypeople.com

History
- Founded: 23 April 2000 (Easter)

Clergy
- Pastor: Daniel Floyd
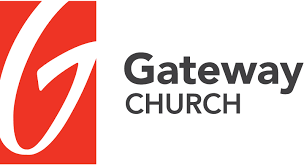

Gateway Church is a non-denominational, evangelical Christian multi-site megachurch based in Southlake, Texas, near Fort Worth. As of 2023, it was ranked as the 9th largest Christian church in the United States, with attendance of 25,805. In 2024, its founding pastor, Robert Morris, resigned after his sexual abuse of a minor became public. Max Lucado, of Oak Hills Church in San Antonio, became the interim teaching pastor, and Joakim Lundqvist of Sweden also has interim pastoral duties.

== History ==
Gateway Church's first service was held on April 23, 2000, at the Hilton Hotel in Grapevine. In June 2003 the church moved to Southlake Blvd. In 2010, Gateway opened its current facility, a 64-acre (26 ha) property. In 2017, Gateway Church downsized their staff by 10-15 percent. In November 2018, CBS News listed Gateway Church as the fourth largest megachurch in the United States with about 28,000 weekly visitors.

=== Sexual abuse and harassment cases ===
In April 2024, the church, while denying liability, settled a 2020 lawsuit brought by the family of a child who alleged that five pastors had concealed the sexual abuse she received from a youth leader in 2018.

In June 2024, the church settled with a woman who alleged in a 2023 case that she worked as an administrative assistant for a Gateway Church pastor who sexually harassed her and that the church fired her while giving the pastor two-years severance. In March 2025, Morris was indicted in Oklahoma on five criminal counts of lewd or indecent acts with a child.

=== Robert Morris allegations and resignations ===
On June 15, 2024, Robert Morris admitted to what he characterized as a "moral failure" involving a pre-teen girl (described by Morris only as a "young lady") that is alleged to have occurred from 1982 through 1987 when he was a young minister. This alleged serial sexual abuse occurred over a five-year period, beginning when the child was 12 years old and ending when the child was 17. This admission appeared shortly after his accuser, Cindy Clemishire, accused Morris of molesting her for four and a half years dating to December 1982, when Clemishire was 12 years old. Morris described his behavior as mere "petting" while the victim alleges eventual "rape by instrumentation" (penetration that is not intercourse). The alleged victim is now in her 50s. In a statement reportedly sent to church staff by the elders of the church, the elders said that: “Since the resolution of this 35-year-old matter, there have been no other moral failures ... Pastor Robert has walked in purity, and he has placed accountability measures and people in his life. The matter has been properly disclosed to church leadership.”

Shortly after the church elders learned additional details of the allegations, including the alleged victim's age and length of the supposed abuse, Robert Morris tendered his resignation, which was accepted. However, according to Cindy Clemishire, "Gateway received actual notice of this crime in 2005 when I sent an email directly to Robert Morris’ Gateway email address. Former Gateway elder, Tom Lane, received and responded to my email, acknowledging that the sexual abuse began on December 25, 1982, when I was 12 years old".

Evangelical Daystar Television Network announced it was removing all Robert Morris programming from its broadcast schedule. Morris's programs were broadcast every day except Saturday.

Robert Morris's son, James Morris, was the Associate Senior Pastor and had been set to take over in 2025. On the advice of lawyers, the Board of Elders as well as James Morris had stepped back to allow an investigation. Weeks later, James Morris and his wife agreed to resign from all duties at the church.

In August 2024, the church announced that a fourth high-ranking member, executive pastor, was asked to resign over an unspecified "moral issue". In October 2024, it was reported that about 20,000 members or nearly 25% of the church's entire membership had left the church following the scandal. In November 2024, Gateway removed four elders from their leadership roles at the church, announcing that the elders in question either knew that Robert Morris had molested a girl starting in 1982 or had failed to inquire into the matter after being informed about it.

Morris is in a legal battle with Gateway and is demanding millions in payments and retirement benefits.

== Campuses ==
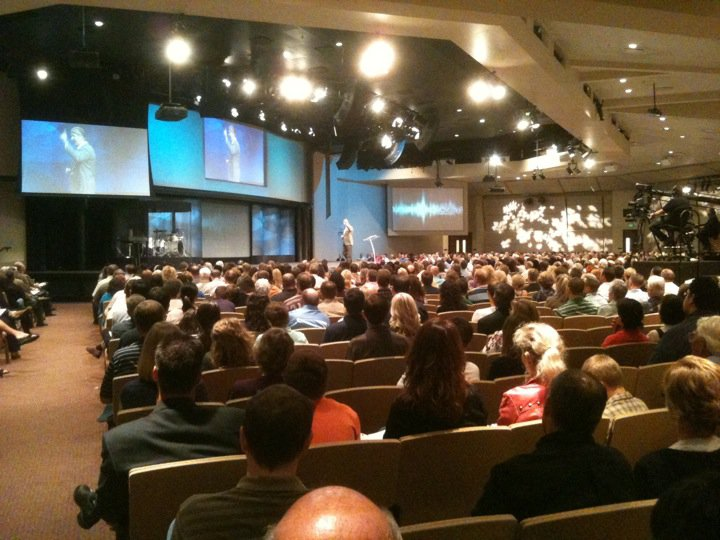
Worship in 2010, old Southlake Campus

In 2008, the church began work on a new main campus located along State Highway 114. The project included a 4,000-seat sanctuary. It opened on November 13, 2010. Mark Jobe, father of contemporary Christian singer Kari Jobe, serves as the Campus Pastor.

In early 2019, Gateway Church announced it was starting a ministry inside the Coffield Unit, the largest prison in the Texas Department of Criminal Justice. It is open to minimum security inmates (and, with special permission, medium security inmates) but all inmates may obtain church materials.

== Ministries ==
=== The King's University at Gateway ===
The King's University was founded in 1997 by Jack W. Hayford. in Van Nuys, California. In September 2012, The King's University at Gateway was launched. The school offers full accredited undergraduate, master's, and a doctorate degree.

=== Gateway Worship ===
Gateway Church utilizes its worship band to lead worship services and create original music that it sells on a commercial record label. Its live album God Be Praised was released on November 9, 2010, with Japanese, Korean and Portuguese versions released in 2012. The live album, Walls, which was released on October 2, 2015, reached No. 1 on Billboard's Top Christian Albums Chart.

== Notable members ==
- Josh Hamilton (baseball player)
- James Robison (televangelist)
