= Christine Pelosi =

American political analyst (born 1966)

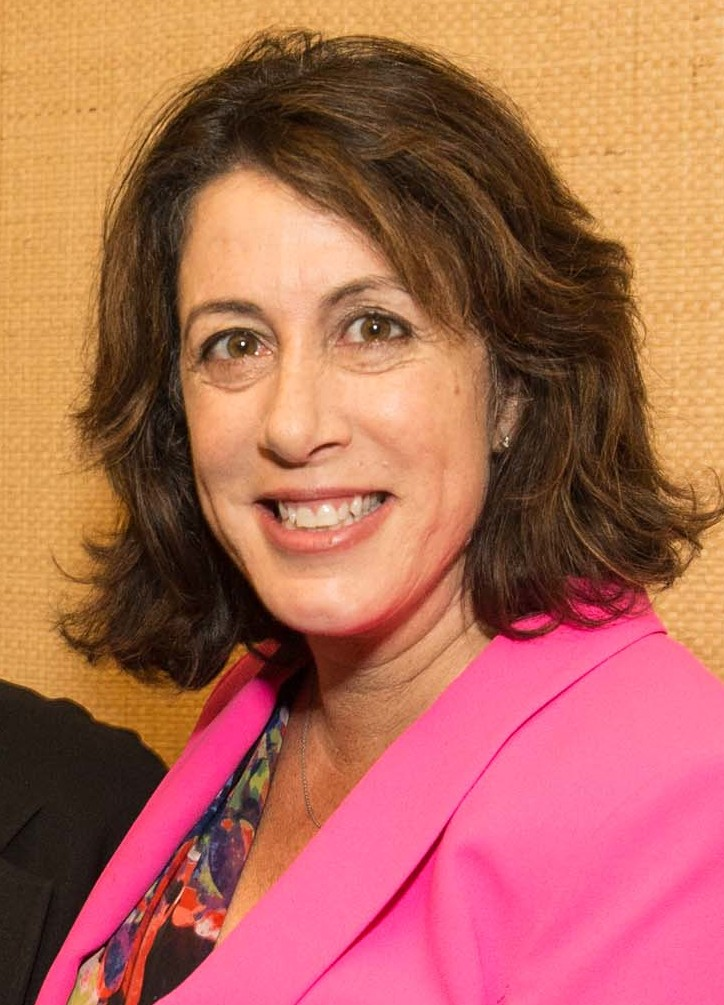
- Pelosi in 2013
- Born: Christine Paule Pelosi; May 5, 1966 (age 60); New York City, U.S.
- Education: Georgetown University (BA); University of California, Hastings (JD)
- Occupation: Political strategist
- Political party: Democratic
- Spouse: Peter Kaufman (m. 2008)
- Children: 1
- Parent(s): Paul Pelosi; Nancy Pelosi
- Relatives: Alexandra Pelosi (sister)
- Website: DNC website Campaign website

Christine Paule Pelosi (born May 5, 1966) is an American Democratic Party political strategist from California. She is the daughter of Nancy Pelosi, the former Speaker of the United States House of Representatives, and businessman Paul Pelosi and sister of Alexandra Pelosi. She is running for California State Senate.

== Early life and education ==
Christine Pelosi is the daughter of Nancy Pelosi and Paul Pelosi, and was born in New York City. She has four siblings: Nancy Corinne, Jacqueline, Paul, and Alexandra.

She holds a bachelor's degree from Georgetown University's Edmund A. Walsh School of Foreign Service and a JD from the University of California Hastings College of the Law.

== Career ==
Her work in public policy and politics includes service as executive director (1998–1999), Platform Chair (1995–2008), and Women's Caucus Chair (2011–2021) of the California Democratic Party; Deputy City Attorney (Construction and Trial Teams) and Assistant District Attorney (Sexual Assault and Child Abuse Unit) for the City of San Francisco; U.S. Department of Housing and Urban Development Special Counsel in the Clinton/Gore Administration (1999–2001); and Chief of Staff to U.S. Representative John F. Tierney (2001–2005). Pelosi has also served as a board member and the Interim Executive Director of the Young Democrats of America (2011).

She is the author of Campaign Boot Camp: Basic Training for Future Leaders (2007) and Campaign Boot Camp 2.0 (2012), books used in her leadership trainings for candidates and causes.

Pelosi has written blog posts for The Huffington Post.

Pelosi has served as volunteer board member for the AIDS Memorial Grove and the New Leaders Council.

She has been named a potential successor to her mother's seat in the House by the Los Angeles Times. She is seen as a successor to her mother given Nancy's immense influence in the San Francisco district. However, a week after her mother announced she would not run for reelection, Pelosi opted not to run for her seat, instead running for a seat in the California State Senate in 2028.

=== Democratic National Committee ===
Pelosi was elected to the Democratic National Committee, where she cofounded the Veterans and Military Families Council, and as of 2021 is Vice Chair for Campaigns and Elections.

In 2020, Pelosi was one of California's automatic delegates to the Democratic National Convention.

=== Electoral college member ===
Pelosi was a presidential elector for the state of California in the 2016 United States presidential election. Every presidential election year, the 538 members of the electoral college meet in their state capitals on December 19 to cast the official vote for president. She helped lead the effort to inform the electors and the public about foreign interference in elections.

== Personal life ==
Pelosi married Peter Kaufman, son of film director Philip Kaufman, on February 16, 2008. They had a daughter in March 2009. Pelosi is a baseball fan, lives within walking distance of the San Francisco Giants' stadium, and serves on the Giants Community Fund board of directors.

On March 22, 2020, Pelosi tweeted "Rand Paul's neighbor was right" in reference to an assault on Senator Rand Paul, and Twitter removed the tweet for violating its rules. Sen. Paul later cited the tweet after Pelosi's father was severely injured by a hammer-wielding assailant.

== Works ==
- Christine Pelosi, Campaign Boot Camp (PoliPointPress, 2007) ISBN 978-0-9794822-0-5
- Christine Pelosi, Campaign Boot Camp 2.0 (Berrett-Koehler, 2012) ISBN 978-1609945169
- Christine Pelosi, The Nancy Pelosi Way (Skyhorse, 2019) ISBN 978-1-5107-5584-0
