= Friends of God: A Road Trip with Alexandra Pelosi =

- Written by: Alexandra Pelosi
- Directed by: Alexandra Pelosi
- Starring: Alexandra Pelosi; Jerry Falwell; Ted Haggard; Ron Luce; Joel Osteen
- Country of origin: United States
- Original language: English

Production
- Producer: Alexandra Pelosi
- Cinematography: Alexandra Pelosi
- Editor: Tom Haneke

Original release
- Network: HBO
- Release: January 25, 2007

Friends of God: A Road Trip With Alexandra Pelosi is an HBO television documentary about evangelicals in the United States that is written, directed, produced, and narrated by Alexandra Pelosi. The documentary first aired on January 25, 2007 on HBO. Lisa Heller was supervising producer and Sheila Nevins was executive producer.

In this documentary, Alexandra Pelosi visits several of the largest evangelical Christian church congregations ("megachurches") in the country, such as Lakewood Church and New Life Church (Colorado Springs, Colorado), and interviews their leaders and members. Pelosi also visits other Christian organizations like the Christian Wrestling Federation, and a Christian-themed car club, and a Christian-themed miniature golf course. The documentary also examines the relationship between Christian evangelical churches and political activism. It covers these organizations' role in modern politics related to issues that include gay rights, abortion, and the creation–evolution controversy.
