= Paul Pelosi =

American businessman (born 1940)

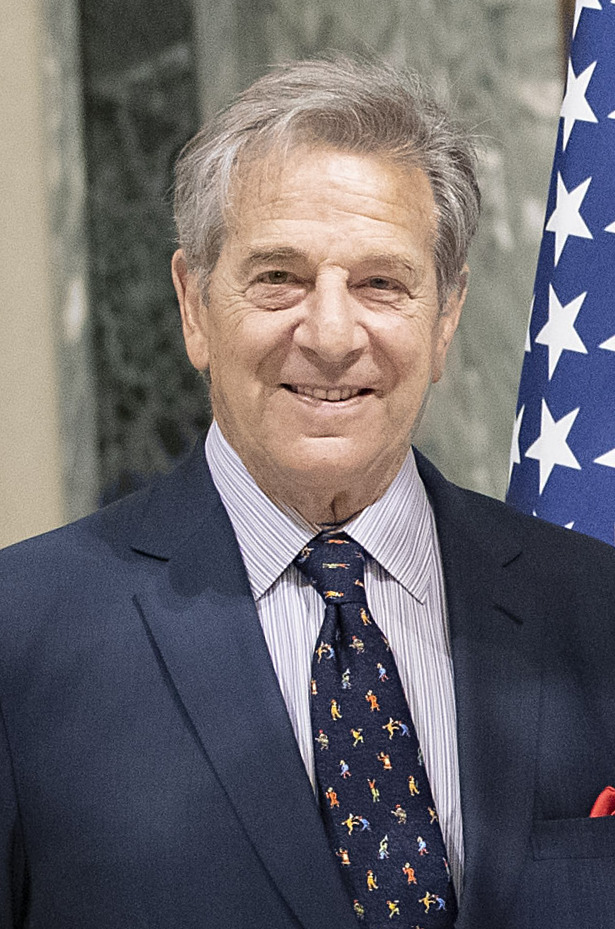
- Pelosi in 2022
- Born: Paul Francis Pelosi; April 15, 1940 (age 86); San Francisco, California, U.S.
- Education: Georgetown University (BS); New York University (MBA)
- Occupation: Businessman
- Spouse: Nancy D'Alesandro (m. 1963)
- Children: 5, including Christine and Alexandra
- Relatives: Ron Pelosi (brother)

Paul Francis Pelosi Sr. (born April 15, 1940) is an American businessman who owns and operates Financial Leasing Services, Inc., a San Francisco–based real estate and venture capital investment and consulting firm. He was the owner of the Sacramento Mountain Lions of the United Football League. He is married to Nancy Pelosi, the 52nd speaker of the United States House of Representatives.

In October 2022, Pelosi was severely beaten after a man wielding a hammer broke into his San Francisco home. Pelosi survived with a skull fracture. The assailant, David DePape, initially targeting Pelosi's wife, was convicted of federal offenses in 2023.

== Early life and education ==
Pelosi was born and raised in San Francisco, the youngest in a family of three boys. He is the son of John Pelosi, a wholesale pharmacist, and his wife Corinne (née Bianchi). He attended St. Ignatius High School and graduated from Malvern Preparatory School in Pennsylvania. He earned a bachelor of science (BS) in foreign service at Georgetown University, during which he met his future wife, Nancy D'Alesandro, who was attending a Catholic women's college, Trinity College, in Washington, D.C. He earned an MBA from the Stern School of Business at New York University. He has been the chair of the Foreign Service Board at Georgetown since 2009.

== Career ==
Pelosi founded and runs the venture capital firm Financial Leasing Services, Inc., through which he and his wife have a personal fortune of about $114 million.

Having previously invested in the Oakland Invaders of the United States Football League, he purchased the California Redwoods, a franchise in the United Football League, for $12 million in 2009. The Redwoods later moved to Sacramento to become the Sacramento Mountain Lions.

Pelosi's success in stock trading attracted media attention in the summer of 2021, leading to efforts to strictly control individual stock ownership by members of Congress.

== Personal life ==
In 1957, at the age of 16, Pelosi lost control of a car that he was driving on Skyline Boulevard, one mile (1.5 kilometers) north of Crystal Springs Dam in San Mateo County, California and crashed. His older brother David, who was a passenger in the car, died in the crash. Moments before the crash, David had warned his brother to reduce speed. Paul Pelosi was exonerated in the matter by the coroner's jury.

Pelosi married Nancy Pelosi (née D'Alesandro) on September 7, 1963, at the Cathedral of Mary Our Queen in Baltimore, Maryland. They have five children, including Christine and Alexandra. Nancy served as the 52nd Speaker of the House of Representatives from 2007 to 2011 and again from 2019 to 2023.

=== Legal issues ===
In May 2022, Paul Pelosi was arrested for driving under the influence of alcohol in Napa County after he crashed into another car at an intersection. Pelosi pleaded guilty in August 2022 and he was sentenced to five days in jail, paying $6,800 in fines and restitution, completing a DUI program, as well as three years of probation.

In July 2026, Pelosi was involved in a hit-and-run misdemeanor charge when his car crashed into an unoccupied parked vehicle in Napa County, and then drove about a quarter of a mile away. The vehicle sustained significant damage to the rear. Pelosi had no alcohol in his system and was not arrested, but a California DMV-referral form was submitted due to Pelosi's advanced age to determine if he should continue driving.

=== 2022 attack ===
In the early hours of October 28, 2022, an assailant broke into Pelosi's San Francisco home, shouted "Where's Nancy?", and subsequently attacked Pelosi with a hammer. The suspect was taken into police custody, while Pelosi was hospitalized with blunt force injuries. He underwent skull surgery after the attack and was discharged from the hospital on November 3. The suspect, 42-year-old David DePape, told police he was on "a suicide mission" and wanted to take Nancy Pelosi hostage, question her, and break her kneecaps if she lied. DePape was charged with multiple crimes including assault, attempted homicide, and attempted kidnapping. He pleaded not guilty to all state charges.

Pelosi first returned to public view over a month later, when he appeared with his wife at the Kennedy Center Honors. He wore a hat and a glove to conceal his injuries.

DePape was convicted on federal charges on November 16, 2023. On May 17, 2024, he was sentenced to 30 years in prison. In October 2024, DePape was sentenced to life without parole in state prison.

When asked by Anderson Cooper about her husband's condition in June 2024, over a year and a half after the attack, Nancy Pelosi replied, "He's making progress. He's about 80% there, physically. Traumatically, it's terrible."
