= Emfuleni Local Municipality elections =

Local elections in Gauteng, South Africa

The Emfuleni Local Municipality council consists of ninety members elected by mixed-member proportional representation. Forty-five councillors are elected by first-past-the-post voting in forty-five wards, while the remaining forty-five are chosen from party lists so that the total number of party representatives is proportional to the number of votes received.

In the election of 4 November 2026, no party won a majority. The Democratic Alliance (DA) won the most seats.

== Results ==
The following table shows the composition of the council after past elections.

Event	ANC	COPE	DA	EFF	FF+	PAC	PA	Other	Total
2000 election	62	—	18	—	1	2	—	2	85
2006 election	65	—	15	—	1	3	—	1	85
2011 election	64	1	21	—	1	1	—	1	89
2016 election	50	1	22	11	2	1	—	3	90
2021 election	38	0	24	14	6	2	1	5	90
2026 election	22	0	37	6	5	2	1	17	90

== December 2000 election ==
The following table shows the results of the 2000 election.

Party	Ward			List			Total seats
Party	Votes	%	Seats	Votes	%	Seats	Total seats
African National Congress	95,144	70.43	35	95,382	72.26	27	62
Democratic Alliance	27,835	20.60	8	28,677	21.72	10	18
Pan Africanist Congress of Azania	3,718	2.75	0	3,484	2.64	2	2
Independent candidates	5,635	4.17	0				0
United Democratic Movement	902	0.67	0	1,570	1.19	1	1
Inkatha Freedom Party	1,023	0.76	0	1,181	0.89	1	1
Freedom Front Plus	559	0.41	0	828	0.63	1	1
Azanian People's Organisation	281	0.21	0	885	0.67	0	0
Total	135,097	100.00	43	132,007	100.00	42	85
Valid votes	135,097	97.68		132,007	96.62		
Invalid/blank votes	3,205	2.32		4,614	3.38		
Total votes	138,302	100.00		136,621	100.00		
Registered voters/turnout	308,632	44.81		308,632	44.27		

== March 2006 election ==
The following table shows the results of the 2006 election.

Party	Ward			List			Total seats
Party	Votes	%	Seats	Votes	%	Seats	Total seats
African National Congress	109,851	76.11	37	110,419	76.62	28	65
Democratic Alliance	24,558	17.02	6	24,168	16.77	9	15
Pan Africanist Congress of Azania	4,398	3.05	0	3,975	2.76	3	3
Freedom Front Plus	2,118	1.47	0	1,829	1.27	1	1
Independent Democrats	948	0.66	0	695	0.48	1	1
African Christian Democratic Party	304	0.21	0	919	0.64	0	0
Independent candidates	1,052	0.73	0				0
Azanian People's Organisation	566	0.39	0	479	0.33	0	0
Inkatha Freedom Party	289	0.20	0	572	0.40	0	0
Socialist Party of Azania	57	0.04	0	553	0.38	0	0
United Democratic Movement	89	0.06	0	495	0.34	0	0
Small-Farm Resident Association	98	0.07	0				0
Total	144,328	100.00	43	144,104	100.00	42	85
Valid votes	144,328	98.44		144,104	98.31		
Invalid/blank votes	2,286	1.56		2,481	1.69		
Total votes	146,614	100.00		146,585	100.00		
Registered voters/turnout	319,623	45.87		319,623	45.86		

== May 2011 election ==
The following table shows the results of the 2011 election.

Party	Ward			List			Total seats
Party	Votes	%	Seats	Votes	%	Seats	Total seats
African National Congress	126,895	67.83	36	131,045	71.80	28	64
Democratic Alliance	42,183	22.55	9	41,376	22.67	12	21
Independent candidates	9,644	5.16	0				0
Pan Africanist Congress of Azania	3,402	1.82	0	2,791	1.53	1	1
African People's Convention	2,134	1.14	0	2,086	1.14	1	1
Congress of the People	239	0.13	0	2,617	1.43	1	1
Freedom Front Plus	1,374	0.73	0	929	0.51	1	1
United Democratic Movement	479	0.26	0	308	0.17	0	0
Azanian People's Organisation	230	0.12	0	308	0.17	0	0
Inkatha Freedom Party	166	0.09	0	340	0.19	0	0
Pan Africanist Movement	169	0.09	0	139	0.08	0	0
National Freedom Party	7	0.00	0	269	0.15	0	0
Socialist Party of Azania	93	0.05	0	161	0.09	0	0
Black Economic Empowerment Party	60	0.03	0	154	0.08	0	0
Total	187,075	100.00	45	182,523	100.00	44	89
Valid votes	187,075	98.00		182,523	97.74		
Invalid/blank votes	3,814	2.00		4,229	2.26		
Total votes	190,889	100.00		186,752	100.00		
Registered voters/turnout	342,715	55.70		342,715	54.49		

== August 2016 election ==
The following table shows the results of the 2016 election.

Party	Ward			List			Total seats
Party	Votes	%	Seats	Votes	%	Seats	Total seats
African National Congress	108,435	55.53	37	109,030	55.73	13	50
Democratic Alliance	48,162	24.66	8	48,199	24.64	14	22
Economic Freedom Fighters	23,865	12.22	0	23,814	12.17	11	11
African Independent Congress	3,902	2.00	0	5,995	3.06	3	3
Freedom Front Plus	4,354	2.23	0	4,186	2.14	2	2
Pan Africanist Congress of Azania	1,857	0.95	0	1,517	0.78	1	1
Congress of the People	2,015	1.03	0	808	0.41	1	1
African Christian Democratic Party	553	0.28	0	585	0.30	0	0
Independent candidates	1,097	0.56	0				0
African People's Convention	218	0.11	0	501	0.26	0	0
United Democratic Movement	296	0.15	0	385	0.20	0	0
Inkatha Freedom Party	147	0.08	0	330	0.17	0	0
Azanian People's Organisation	177	0.09	0	140	0.07	0	0
Ubuntu Party	115	0.06	0	110	0.06	0	0
Alternative African Allegiance	79	0.04	0	39	0.02	0	0
United Front of Civics	10	0.01	0				0
Total	195,282	100.00	45	195,639	100.00	45	90
Valid votes	195,282	98.71		195,639	98.64		
Invalid/blank votes	2,543	1.29		2,696	1.36		
Total votes	197,825	100.00		198,335	100.00		
Registered voters/turnout	362,634	54.55		362,634	54.69		

== November 2021 election ==
The following table shows the results of the 2021 election.

Party	Ward			List			Total seats
Party	Votes	%	Seats	Votes	%	Seats	Total seats
African National Congress	60,054	39.73	38	59,891	39.69	0	38
Democratic Alliance	40,157	26.56	7	41,134	27.26	17	24
Economic Freedom Fighters	23,326	15.43	0	23,763	15.75	14	14
Freedom Front Plus	10,265	6.79	0	9,201	6.10	6	6
Pan Africanist Congress of Azania	2,932	1.94	0	2,862	1.90	2	2
Community Solidarity Association	2,224	1.47	0	2,774	1.84	2	2
New Horizon Movement	1,976	1.31	0	1,875	1.24	1	1
African Christian Democratic Party	1,365	0.90	0	1,306	0.87	1	1
Vaal Alternative Alliance Lekgotla	1,234	0.82	0	1,039	0.69	1	1
Independent candidates	2,231	1.48	0				0
Patriotic Alliance	732	0.48	0	815	0.54	1	1
African Transformation Movement	580	0.38	0	691	0.46	0	0
African Independent Congress	395	0.26	0	740	0.49	0	0
South African Royal Kingdoms Organization	563	0.37	0	567	0.38	0	0
Congress of the People	524	0.35	0	509	0.34	0	0
United Democratic Movement	285	0.19	0	489	0.32	0	0
African People's Convention	30	0.02	0	714	0.47	0	0
Spectrum National Party	367	0.24	0	258	0.17	0	0
Active Nation Against Corruption	334	0.22	0	179	0.12	0	0
Black First Land First	185	0.12	0	317	0.21	0	0
Inkatha Freedom Party	41	0.03	0	410	0.27	0	0
Activists Movement of South Africa	192	0.13	0	191	0.13	0	0
National Freedom Party	155	0.10	0	221	0.15	0	0
International Revelation Congress	153	0.10	0	219	0.15	0	0
Azanian People's Organisation	210	0.14	0	143	0.09	0	0
Africa Restoration Alliance	160	0.11	0	146	0.10	0	0
Alternative African Allegiance	136	0.09	0	114	0.08	0	0
Party of Action	100	0.07	0	134	0.09	0	0
African Freedom Revolution	87	0.06	0	81	0.05	0	0
National People's Front	55	0.04	0	85	0.06	0	0
Bolsheviks Party of South Africa	83	0.05	0	46	0.03	0	0
Land Party	36	0.02	0				0
Voter's Independent Party - SA	1	0.00	0				0
Total	151,168	100.00	45	150,914	100.00	45	90
Valid votes	151,168	98.49		150,914	98.52		
Invalid/blank votes	2,316	1.51		2,267	1.48		
Total votes	153,484	100.00		153,181	100.00		
Registered voters/turnout	351,544	43.66		351,544	43.57		

Following the loss of its outright majority, the ANC governs in coalition with the Pan Africanist Congress of Azania (PAC), the Community Solidarity Association (CSA), as well as the Patriotic Alliance (PA), New Horizon Movement and the VAAL party.

=== By-elections from November 2021 ===
The following by-elections were held to fill vacant ward seats in the period since the election in November 2021.

Date	Ward	Party of the previous councillor	Party of the newly elected councillor
13 Mar 2024	16	African National Congress	African National Congress
23 Jul 2025	35	African National Congress	African National Congress
27 May 2026	28	African National Congress	Democratic Alliance

== November 2026 election ==
The following table shows the results of the 2026 election.

Party	Ward			List			Total seats
Party	Votes	%	Seats	Votes	%	Seats	Total seats
Democratic Alliance	78,217	40.52	34	79,180	41.29	3	37
African National Congress	46,309	23.99	11	45,857	23.91	11	22
Economic Freedom Fighters	11,951	6.19	0	11,572	6.03	6	6
ActionSA	10,804	5.60	0	11,709	6.11	5	5
Freedom Front Plus	10,647	5.52	0	10,943	5.71	5	5
uMkhonto weSizwe Party	7,788	4.03	0	8,566	4.47	4	4
South African Communist Party	5,698	2.95	0	5,287	2.76	3	3
Pan Africanist Congress of Azania	3,910	2.03	0	3,601	1.88	2	2
Active Citizens of South Africa	3,207	1.66	0	2,759	1.44	2	2
Patriotic Alliance	2,170	1.12	0	1,333	0.70	1	1
African Transformation Movement	1,273	0.66	0	1,389	0.72	1	1
Tau Dia Rora Cultural and Traditional Lekgotla	920	0.48	0	1,025	0.53	1	1
Afrika Mayibuye Movement	871	0.45	0	786	0.41	1	1
Vaal Party	784	0.41	0	631	0.33	0	0
African Congress for Transformation	748	0.39	0	600	0.31	0	0
Independent candidates	1,312	0.68	0				0
African Christian Democratic Party	318	0.16	0	924	0.48	0	0
Azanian People's Organisation	503	0.26	0	422	0.22	0	0
Sedibeng Emfuleni Residents Associations	433	0.22	0	459	0.24	0	0
African People's Convention	527	0.27	0	284	0.15	0	0
Inkatha Freedom Party	269	0.14	0	474	0.25	0	0
Build One South Africa	377	0.20	0	340	0.18	0	0
United Africans Transformation	158	0.08	0	495	0.26	0	0
Civic Movement for Progressive Citizens	572	0.30	0				0
All Citizens Party	283	0.15	0	264	0.14	0	0
Move SA	279	0.14	0	238	0.12	0	0
Economic Liberators Forum South Africa	251	0.13	0	256	0.13	0	0
Congress of the People	238	0.12	0	215	0.11	0	0
Unified Civic Organisation	229	0.12	0	181	0.09	0	0
Stretford Wildebeesfontein Elected Civic Organisation	226	0.12	0	173	0.09	0	0
South African Royal Kingdoms Organization	145	0.08	0	233	0.12	0	0
African Economic Freedom	135	0.07	0	193	0.10	0	0
African Alliance Congress	154	0.08	0	154	0.08	0	0
United Democratic Movement	306	0.16	0				0
Al Jama-ah	127	0.07	0	140	0.07	0	0
Vaal River City Democratic Movement	104	0.05	0	157	0.08	0	0
African Royal Rainbow Congress	16	0.01	0	223	0.12	0	0
Africa Restoration Alliance	107	0.06	0	126	0.07	0	0
Truth and Solidarity Movement	117	0.06	0	94	0.05	0	0
Labour Party of South Africa	111	0.06	0	77	0.04	0	0
Know Your Power	89	0.05	0	40	0.02	0	0
International Revelation Congress	58	0.03	0	67	0.03	0	0
Buyisa Community Movement	53	0.03	0	64	0.03	0	0
Transformative Yes Movement	37	0.02	0	61	0.03	0	0
Freedom in South Africa	41	0.02	0	52	0.03	0	0
Gaza Democratic Front	26	0.01	0	54	0.03	0	0
Alternative African Allegiance	51	0.03	0	28	0.01	0	0
Amalgamated National Forum	30	0.02	0	37	0.02	0	0
African Renaissance Unity	58	0.03	0				0
United Independent Movement	2	0.00	0				0
Total	193,039	100.00	45	191,763	100.00	45	90
Valid votes	193,039	98.77		191,763	98.84		
Invalid/blank votes	2,408	1.23		2,257	1.16		
Total votes	195,447	100.00		194,020	100.00		
Registered voters/turnout	371,556	52.60		371,556	52.22		
