= Nancy Pelosi =

American politician (born 1940)

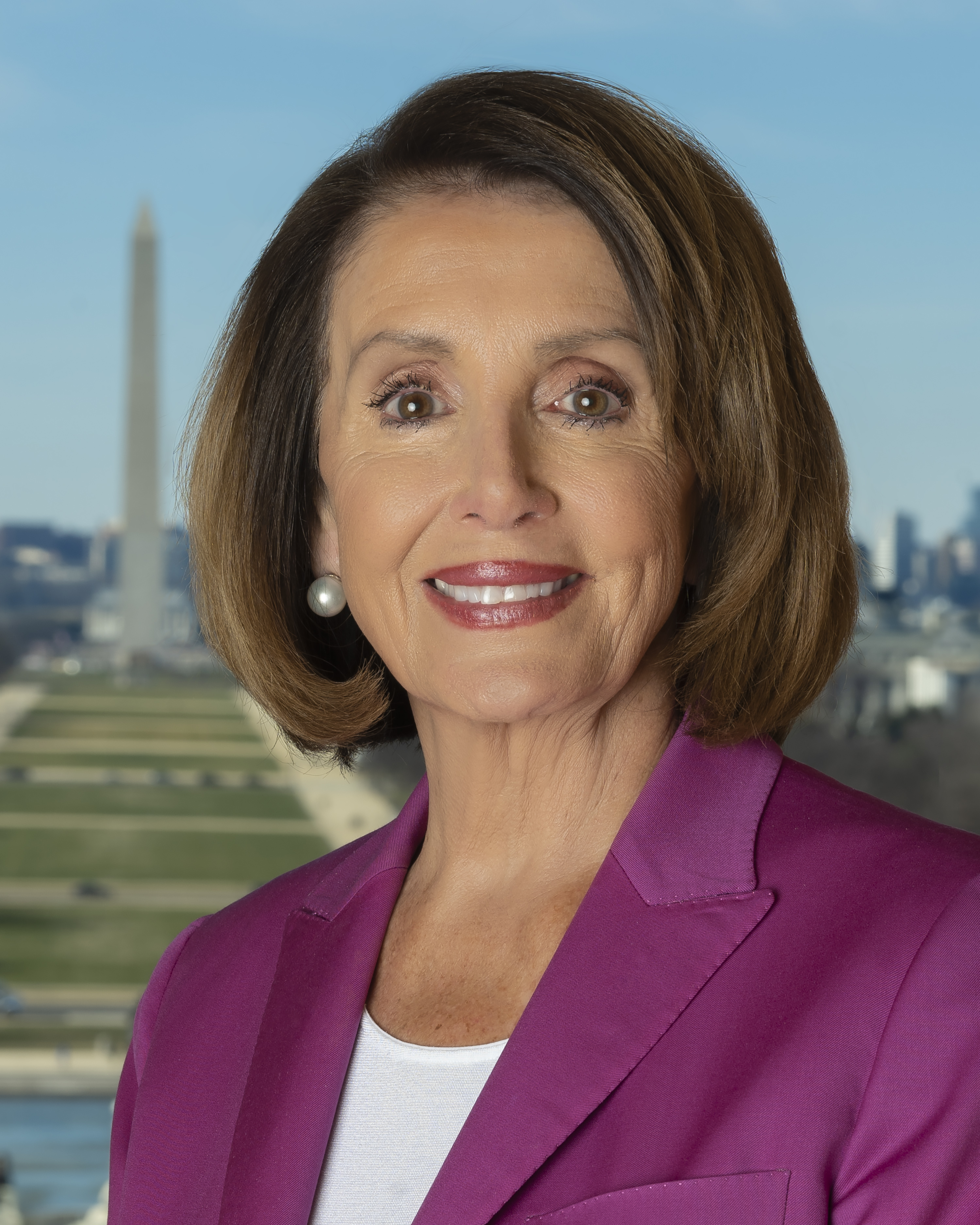
- Official portrait, 2019

52nd Speaker of the United States House of Representatives
- In office January 3, 2019 – January 3, 2023
- Preceded by: Paul Ryan
- Succeeded by: Kevin McCarthy
- In office January 4, 2007 – January 3, 2011
- Preceded by: Dennis Hastert
- Succeeded by: John Boehner
House positions
House Minority Leader
In office January 3, 2011 – January 3, 2019
Whip	Steny Hoyer
Preceded by	John Boehner
Succeeded by	Kevin McCarthy
In office January 3, 2003 – January 3, 2007
Whip	Steny Hoyer
Preceded by	Dick Gephardt
Succeeded by	John Boehner
Leader of the House Democratic Caucus
In office January 3, 2003 – January 3, 2023
Deputy	Steny Hoyer
Preceded by	Dick Gephardt
Succeeded by	Hakeem Jeffries
House Minority Whip
In office January 15, 2002 – January 3, 2003
Leader	Dick Gephardt
Preceded by	David Bonior
Succeeded by	Steny Hoyer

Member of the U.S. House of Representatives from California
- Incumbent
- Assumed office June 2, 1987 (Note: Pelosi's official service begins on the date of the special election, while she was not sworn in until June 9, 1987.)
- Preceded by: Sala Burton
- Constituency: 5th district (1987–1993); 8th district (1993–2013); 12th district (2013–2023); 11th district (2023–present)

Chair of the California Democratic Party
- In office February 27, 1981 – April 3, 1983
- Preceded by: Richard O'Neill
- Succeeded by: Peter Kelly

Personal details
- Born: Nancy Patricia D'Alesandro; March 26, 1940 (age 86) Baltimore, Maryland, U.S.
- Party: Democratic
- Spouse: Paul Pelosi (m. 1963)
- Children: 5, including Christine and Alexandra
- Relatives: Thomas D'Alesandro Jr. (father); Thomas D'Alesandro III (brother)
- Education: Trinity College, Washington (BA)
- Awards: Presidential Medal of Freedom (2024)
- Website: House website Campaign website
- Pelosi's voice Pelosi on the death of former Amb. Richard Holbrooke; Recorded December 18, 2010

Nancy Patricia Pelosi (Note: Pronunciation: /pəˈloʊsi/, pə-LOH-see) (née D'Alesandro, born March 26, 1940) is an American politician who was the 52nd speaker of the United States House of Representatives, serving from 2007 to 2011 and again from 2019 to 2023. A member of the Democratic Party, she was the first woman to lead a major political party in either chamber of Congress, leading the House Democrats from 2003 to 2023. Her 20 years as a House party leader are tied with Joe Martin's as the second-longest after Sam Rayburn. Pelosi is in her 20th term, having served in the House since 1987, representing California's 11th congressional district, which includes most of San Francisco. She is the dean of California's congressional delegation.

The daughter of Representative Thomas D'Alesandro Jr., Pelosi was born and raised in Baltimore. She graduated from Trinity College, Washington, in 1962 and married businessman Paul Pelosi the next year. They moved to New York City before settling down in San Francisco with their children. Focused on raising her family, Pelosi entered politics in the 1960s as a volunteer for the Democratic Party. After years of party work, rising to chair the state party, she was first elected to Congress in a 1987 special election. Pelosi steadily rose through the ranks of the House Democratic Caucus to be elected House minority whip in 2001 and elevated to House minority leader a year later.

In the 2006 midterm elections, Pelosi led the Democrats to a majority in the House for the first time in 12 years and was subsequently elected Speaker. She was the first woman to hold the office. Until 2021, Pelosi was the highest-ranking woman in the presidential line of succession in U.S. history. During her first speakership, Pelosi was a major opponent of the Iraq War as well as the Bush administration's attempts to partially privatize Social Security. She then helped pass the Obama administration's landmark bills, including the Affordable Care Act, the Dodd–Frank Wall Street Reform and Consumer Protection Act, the Don't Ask, Don't Tell Repeal Act, the American Recovery and Reinvestment Act of 2009, and the 2010 Tax Relief Act. Pelosi lost the speakership after the Republican Party retook the majority in the 2010 midterm elections, but retained her role as leader of the House Democrats.

In the 2018 midterms, Democrats regained majority control of the House, and Pelosi was again elected speaker. This made her the first former speaker to reclaim the gavel since Sam Rayburn in 1955. During her second speakership, the House impeached President Donald Trump twice, first in December 2019 and again in January 2021; the Senate, unable to reach the two-thirds majority necessary for conviction, acquitted Trump both times. She contributed to the passage of the Biden administration's principal bills, such as the American Rescue Plan Act of 2021, the Infrastructure Investment and Jobs Act, the CHIPS and Science Act, and the Inflation Reduction Act of 2022. In the 2022 midterms, Republicans narrowly retook control of the House, ending her tenure as speaker. She subsequently retired as House Democratic leader, and was succeeded by Hakeem Jeffries. In November 2025, she announced she would not seek reelection in 2026 and would retire in January 2027. Considered an influential power broker in modern American politics, Pelosi has been regarded as a polarizing figure, drawing criticism from both conservatives and progressives for her policy positions, anti-populist rhetoric, and leadership style, and has faced scrutiny over issues such as the Trump impeachments, insider trading allegations, and moments seen by critics as emblematic of liberal elitism.

== Early life and education ==
Nancy Patricia D'Alesandro was born in Baltimore, Maryland, to an Italian-American family. She was the only daughter and the youngest of six children of Annunciata M. "Nancy" D'Alesandro (née Lombardi) and Thomas D'Alesandro Jr. Her mother, originating from Fornelli in Southern Italy, emigrated to the U.S. in 1912; her father traced his Italian ancestry to Genoa, Venice and Abruzzo.

At the time of Pelosi's birth, her father was a Democratic congressman representing Maryland. He became mayor of Baltimore seven years later. Pelosi's mother was also active in politics, organizing Democratic women and teaching her daughter political skills. Her brother, Thomas D'Alesandro III, a Democrat, was elected Baltimore City Council president and later mayor, serving from 1967 to 1971. As a child, Pelosi helped her father at his campaign events. Her affiliation with liberalism sprouted in the 1960s; she was particularly impressed by President John F. Kennedy's inaugural address.

In 1958, Pelosi graduated from the Institute of Notre Dame, an all-girls Catholic high school in Baltimore. She graduated from Trinity College four years later with a Bachelor of Arts in political science. Pelosi interned for Maryland senator Daniel Brewster in the 1960s alongside future House majority leader Steny Hoyer.

== Early career ==
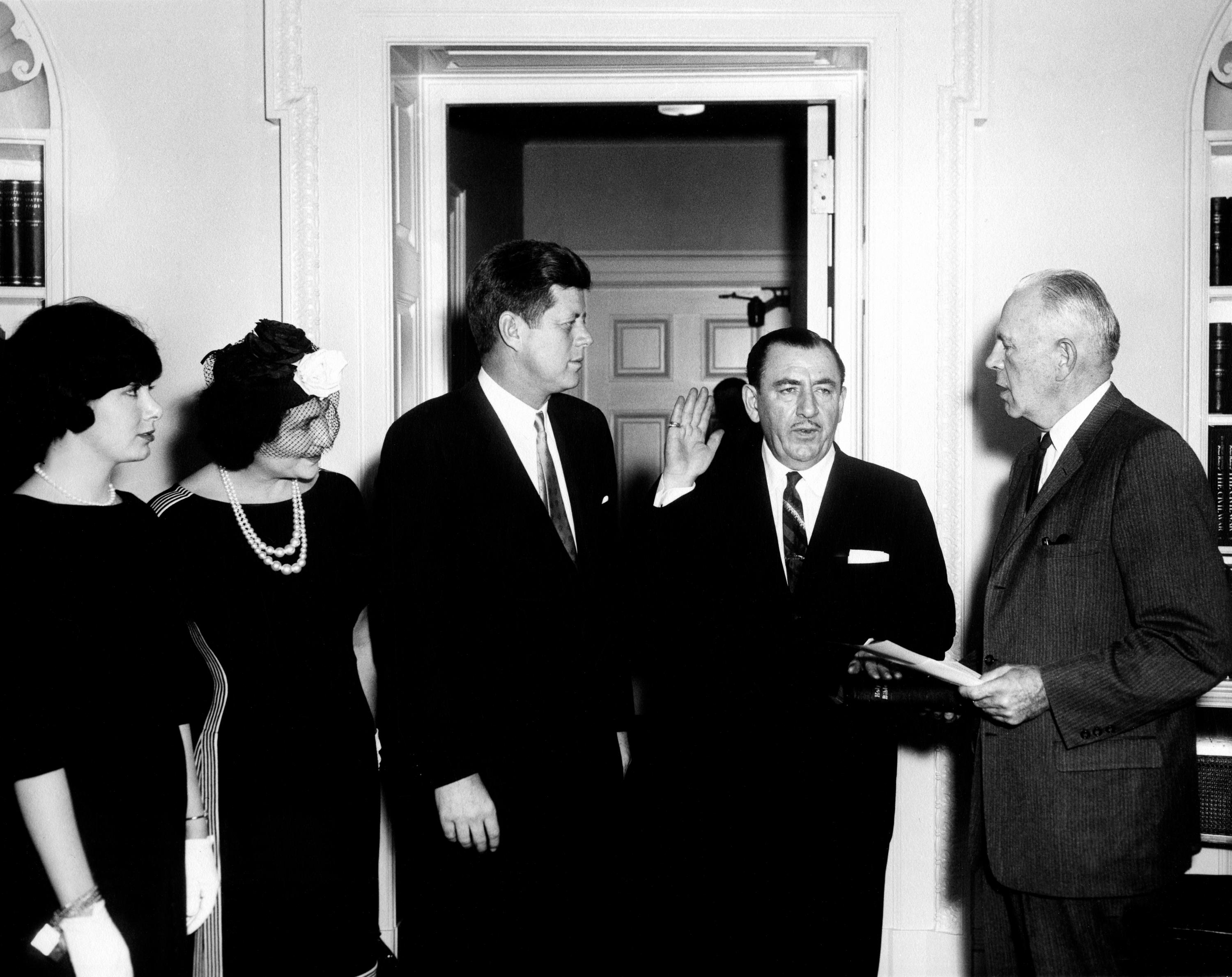
Pelosi, her mother, and President John F. Kennedy watch as her father is sworn in as a member of the Renegotiation Board, 1961.

After moving to San Francisco, Pelosi became friends with 5th district congressman Phillip Burton. In 1976, she was elected as a Democratic National Committee member from California, a position she would hold until 1996. She was elected party chair for Northern California in 1977 and four years later was selected to head the California Democratic Party, which she led until 1983. Pelosi served as the San Francisco Democratic National Convention Host Committee chairwoman in 1984 and Democratic Senatorial Campaign Committee finance chair from 1985 to 1986.

== Early U.S. House of Representatives career ==
Phillip Burton died in 1983 and his wife, Sala Burton, won a special election to fill the remainder of her husband's congressional term and was reelected to two more terms. Burton decided not to run for reelection in 1988 and wanted Pelosi to succeed her, guaranteeing Pelosi the support of the Burtons' contacts. After Sala Burton's death, Pelosi won the special election to succeed her.

Pelosi has continued to represent approximately the same area of San Francisco for her entire congressional career, despite the boundaries shifting marginally in decennial post-reapportionment redistrictings. This area has been represented in the House by Democrats uninterruptedly since 1949, and is strongly Democratic-leaning (as of 2006, 13% of registered voters in the boundaries of Pelosi's district were Republican). It has not seen a serious Republican congressional contender since the early 1960s. Pelosi has been reelected to the House 18 times without any substantive opposition. Unlike in her 1987 campaign, Pelosi has not participated in candidates' debates in her reelection campaigns. In her first seven reelection campaigns (from 1988 through 2004), she won an average of 80% of the vote.

When Pelosi took office, there were only 23 women in the House. The AIDS epidemic was at a dire point. San Francisco was greatly affected; its large population of gay men was the epidemic's initial epicenter. Beginning in her first term, Pelosi became a prominent congressional advocate on behalf of those impacted by HIV/AIDS. Shortly after she took office, she hired a gay man as her congressional office's director of AIDS policy. In her first floor speech, Pelosi promised that she would be an advocate in the fight against what she called "the crisis of AIDS". With great stigma around the subject, some in her party privately chastised her for associating herself with it. Pelosi co-authored the Ryan White CARE Act, which allocated funding dedicated to providing treatment and services for those impacted by HIV/AIDS. President George H. W. Bush signed the bill into law in December 1990.

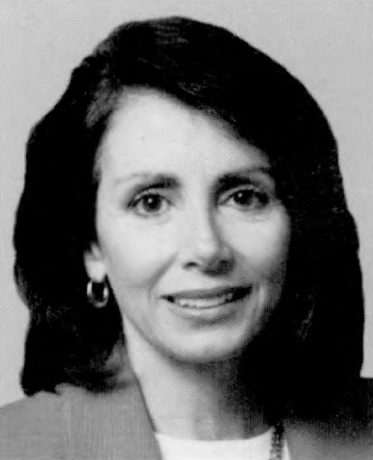
Pelosi as a member of the U.S. House of Representatives, 1993

Pelosi voted for the Abandoned Shipwrecks Act of 1987. The Act asserts United States title to certain abandoned shipwrecks on or embedded in submerged lands under state jurisdiction, and transfers title to the respective state, thereby empowering states to manage these cultural and historical resources more efficiently, with the goal of preventing treasure hunters and salvagers from damaging them. President Ronald Reagan signed it into law on April 28, 1988.

In March 1988, Pelosi voted for the Civil Rights Restoration Act of 1987 (and to override Reagan's veto).

Pelosi helped shape the Brady Handgun Violence Prevention Act, working with California Senator Dianne Feinstein and New York Congressman Chuck Schumer. It became law in 1994. Pelosi also held chairs on important committees, such as the House Appropriations Committee and the House Intelligence Committee.

In 2001, Pelosi was elected the House minority whip, second-in-command to Minority Leader Dick Gephardt. She was the first woman in U.S. history to hold that post. Pelosi defeated John Lewis and Steny Hoyer for the position. A strong fundraiser, she used campaign contributions to help persuade other members of Congress to support her candidacy.

Pelosi served on the Appropriations and Intelligence Committees and was the ranking member on the latter until her election as minority leader.

In 2002, Pelosi opposed the Iraq Resolution authorizing President George W. Bush to use military force against Iraq, which passed the House on a 296–133 vote. She said, "unilateral use of force without first exhausting every diplomatic remedy and other remedies and making a case to the American people will be harmful to our war on terrorism."

=== Role as a Democratic Party fundraiser ===
Early in her political career, Pelosi established herself as a prominent fundraiser in the party. She was one of the party's most prolific fundraisers, transferring significant funds to committees for other candidates. During the 2000 and 2002 election cycles, among members of Congress, she contributed the most money to other congressional campaigns. In 2006, Pelosi was the Democratic Party's third-largest fundraiser, behind former first couple Bill and Hillary Clinton. From 2003 to 2014, Pelosi raised more than $400 million in campaign funds.

== First tenure as minority leader (2003–2007) ==
In November 2002, after Gephardt resigned as House minority leader to seek the Democratic nomination in the 2004 presidential election, Pelosi was elected to replace him, becoming the first woman to lead a major party in either chamber of Congress. In the campaign to succeed Gephardt as the House Democratic Caucus's leader, Pelosi was challenged by Harold Ford Jr. and Marcy Kaptur. Kaptur withdrew her candidacy for the position before the November 15, 2002, caucus vote, and Pelosi defeated Ford 117–29 in the closed-door vote of caucus members. Critics of Pelosi characterized her as too liberal to be a successful House leader.

As minority leader, Pelosi sharply criticized the handling of the Iraq War by President Bush and his administration, in 2004 saying Bush had demonstrated areas of "incompetence".

In a relative surprise, the Democratic Party lost three seats in the 2004 House elections, which coincided with Bush's reelection as president. Focused on retaking the House majority in 2006, in her second term as minority leader Pelosi worked to criticize the Bush administration more effectively and to contrast the Democratic Party with it. As part of this, Pelosi voiced even harsher criticism of Bush's handling of the Iraq War. In November 2005, prominent congressional Democrat John Murtha proposed that the U.S. begin a withdrawal of troops from Iraq at the "earliest predictable date". Pelosi initially declined to commit to supporting Murtha's proposal. Speaker Dennis Hastert soon brought to the floor a vote on a non-binding resolution calling for an immediate withdrawal of troops, seeking to trap Democrats into taking a more radical stance. Pelosi led Democrats in voting against the resolution, which failed in a 403–3 floor vote. Roughly two weeks later, Pelosi held a press conference in which she endorsed Murtha's proposal. Some critics believed that Pelosi's support for a troop withdrawal would prevent the Democrats from winning a House majority in the 2006 elections.

During her time as minority leader, Pelosi was not well known to much of the American public. Before the 2006 elections, Republicans made a concerted effort to taint public perception of her, running advertisements assailing her. Advertisements demonizing Pelosi became a routine part of Republican advertising in subsequent elections. For instance, during the 2022 election cycle, Republicans ran more than $50 million in ads that negatively characterized or invoked Pelosi, and in the 2010 cycle, they spent more than $65 million on such ads.

== First speakership (2007–2011) ==
=== 2007 speakership election ===
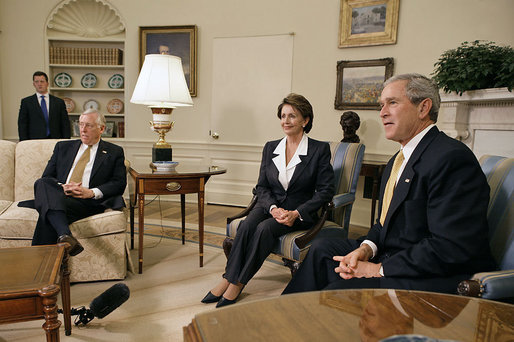
President George W. Bush meets with Speaker-designate Pelosi and House Minority Whip Steny Hoyer on November 9, 2006.

In the 2006 elections, the Democrats took control of the House, picking up 30 seats, the party's largest House seat gain since the 1974 elections held in the wake of the Watergate scandal. The party's House majority meant that as the party's incumbent House leader, Pelosi was widely expected to become speaker in the next Congress. On November 16, 2006, the Democratic caucus unanimously nominated her for speaker.

Pelosi supported her longtime friend John Murtha for House majority leader, the second-ranking post in the House. His competitor was House Minority Whip Steny Hoyer, who had been Pelosi's second-in-command since 2003. Hoyer was elected House majority leader over Murtha by a margin of 149–86.

On January 4, 2007, Pelosi defeated Republican John Boehner of Ohio, 233 votes to 202, in the election for speaker of the House.

Rahm Emanuel, the incoming chairman of the House Democratic Caucus, nominated Pelosi, and her longtime friend John Dingell swore her in, as the dean of the House of Representatives traditionally does.

Pelosi (right) with Vice President Dick Cheney behind President George W. Bush at the 2007 State of the Union Address. Pelosi became the first woman to sit behind the podium at such an address. Bush acknowledged this by beginning his speech with the words, "Tonight, I have the high privilege and distinct honor of my own as the first president to begin the State of the Union message with these words: Madam Speaker."

Pelosi was the first woman, the first Californian, and the first Italian-American to hold the speakership. She was also the second speaker from a state west of the Rocky Mountains. The first was Washington's Tom Foley, the last Democrat to hold the post before Pelosi.

During her speech, she discussed the historical importance of being the first woman to hold the position of Speaker:

This is a historic moment—for the Congress, and for the women of this country. It is a moment for which we have waited more than 200 years. Never losing faith, we waited through the many years of struggle to achieve our rights. But women weren't just waiting; women were working. Never losing faith, we worked to redeem the promise of America, that all men and women are created equal. For our daughters and granddaughters, today, we have broken the marble ceiling. For our daughters and our granddaughters, the sky is the limit, anything is possible for them.

She also said Iraq was the major issue facing the 110th Congress while incorporating some Democratic Party beliefs:

The election of 2006 was a call to change—not merely to change the control of Congress, but for a new direction for our country. Nowhere were the American people more clear about the need for a new direction than in Iraq. The American people rejected an open-ended obligation to a war without end.

As speaker, Pelosi remained the leader of the House Democrats, as the speaker is considered the leader of the majority caucus. But by tradition, she did not normally participate in debate and almost never voted on the floor, though she had the right to do so as a member of the House. She was also not a member of any House committees, also in keeping with tradition.

Pelosi was reelected speaker in 2009.

=== Public perception ===
During and after her first tenure as speaker, Pelosi was widely characterized as a polarizing political figure. Republican candidates often associated their Democratic opponents with her. Pelosi became the focus of heavy disdain by "mainstream" Republicans and Tea Party Republicans alike, as well as from the left.

As they had in 2006, Republicans continued to run advertisements that demonized Pelosi. Before the 2010 House elections, the Republican National Committee prominently used a "Fire Pelosi" slogan in its efforts to recapture the House majority. This slogan was rolled out hours after the House passed the Patient Protection and Affordable Care Act. Republicans spent $65 million ahead of the 2010 elections on anti-Pelosi advertisements. Pelosi long remained a target of Republican attacks. Ads demonizing her have been credited with fostering intense right-wing ire toward her, and have been seen as one of the top factors in her unpopularity with the public.

=== Social Security ===
Shortly after being reelected in 2004, President Bush claimed a mandate for an ambitious second-term agenda and proposed reforming Social Security by allowing workers to redirect a portion of their Social Security withholding into stock and bond investments. Pelosi strongly opposed the plan, saying there was no crisis, and as minority leader she imposed intense party discipline on her caucus, leading them to near-unanimous opposition to the proposal, which was defeated.

=== Blocking of impeachment proceedings against President Bush ===
In the wake of Bush's 2004 reelection, several leading House Democrats believed they should pursue impeachment proceedings against him, asserting that he had misled Congress about weapons of mass destruction in Iraq and violated Americans' civil liberties by authorizing warrantless wiretaps.

In May 2006, with an eye on the upcoming midterm elections—which offered the possibility of Democrats taking back control of the House for the first time since 1994—Pelosi told colleagues that, while the Democrats would conduct vigorous oversight of Bush administration policy, an impeachment investigation was "off the table". A week earlier, she had told The Washington Post that although Democrats would not set out to impeach Bush, "you never know where" investigations might lead.

After becoming speaker in 2007, Pelosi held firm against impeachment, notwithstanding strong support for it among her constituents. In the 2008 election, she withstood a challenge for her seat by antiwar activist Cindy Sheehan, who ran as an independent primarily because of Pelosi's refusal to pursue impeachment.

=== The "Hundred Hours" ===
Before the midterm elections, Pelosi announced that if Democrats gained a House majority, they would push through most of their agenda during the first 100 hours of the 110th Congress.

The "first hundred hours" was a play on President Franklin D. Roosevelt's promise for quick action to combat the Great Depression during his "first hundred days" in office. Newt Gingrich, who became speaker of the House in 1995, had a similar 100-day agenda to implement his Contract with America.

=== Opposition to Iraq War troop surge of 2007 ===
On January 5, 2007, reacting to suggestions from Bush's confidants that he would increase troop levels in Iraq (which he announced in a speech a few days later), Pelosi and Senate Majority Leader Harry Reid condemned the plan. They sent Bush a letter reading:

[T]here is no purely military solution in Iraq. There is only a political solution. Adding more combat troops will only endanger more Americans and stretch our military to the breaking point for no strategic gain. ... Rather than deploy additional forces to Iraq, we believe the way forward is to begin the phased redeployment of our forces in the next four to six months while shifting the principal mission of our forces there from combat to training, logistics, force protection, and counter-terror.

=== 2008 Democratic National Convention ===
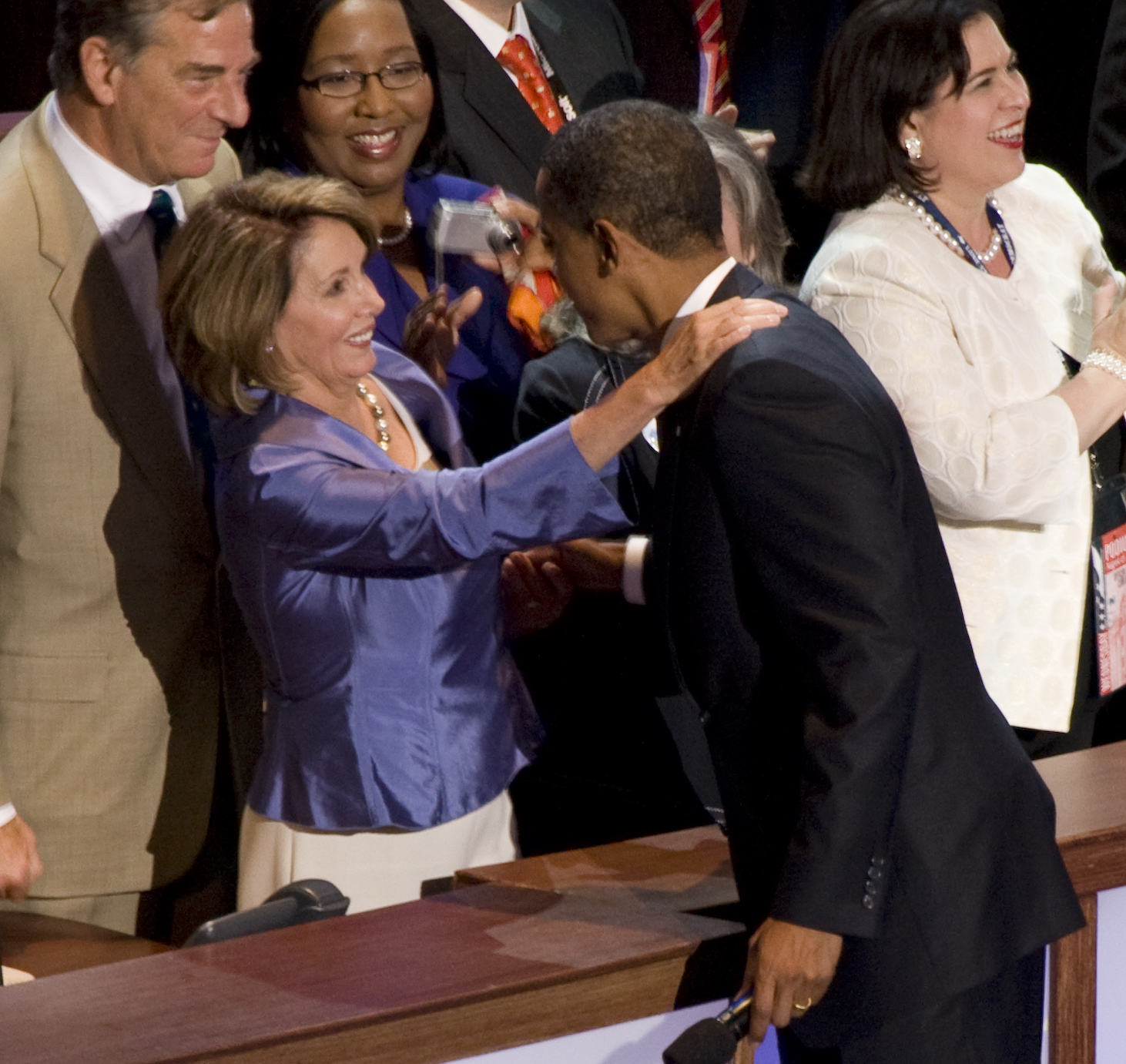
Pelosi and Barack Obama shaking hands at the 2008 Democratic National Convention

Pelosi was named Permanent Chair of the 2008 Democratic National Convention in Denver, Colorado.

=== Healthcare reform ===
Pelosi has been credited for spearheading Obama's health care law, the Affordable Care Act, when it seemed doomed to defeat. After Republican Scott Brown won Democrat Ted Kennedy's former Senate seat in the January 2010 Massachusetts special election, costing Democrats their 60-seat filibuster-proof majority, Obama agreed with his then chief of staff Rahm Emanuel's idea to do smaller initiatives that could pass easily. But Pelosi dismissed Obama's compunction, mocking his scaled-back ideas as "kiddie care". After convincing him that this was their only shot at health care reform because of the large Democratic majorities in Congress, she rallied her caucus as she began an "unbelievable marathon" of a two-month session to craft the bill, which passed the House 219–212. In Obama's remarks before signing the bill into law, he called Pelosi "one of the best speakers the House of Representatives has ever had."

=== Assessments of first speakership ===
By early 2010, analysts were assessing Pelosi as possibly the most powerful woman in U.S. history and among the most powerful speakers of the previous 100 years. In March 2010, Mark Shields wrote:

In the last four months, [Pelosi] has not once, not twice but on three separate occasions done what none of her predecessors—including legendary giants [Tip O'Neill and Sam Rayburn]—could ever do: persuade the House of Representatives to pass national health-care reform. Pelosi has proved herself to be the most powerful woman in U.S. political history.

Later in 2010, Gail Russell Chaddock of The Christian Science Monitor opined that Pelosi was the "most powerful House speaker since Sam Rayburn a half century ago", adding that she had also been "one of the most partisan". Scholars favorably assessed Pelosi's first speakership. In late 2010, Norman Ornstein, a congressional scholar at the conservative-leaning American Enterprise Institute, opined that despite polarized public opinion of Pelosi, "she's going to rank quite high in the pantheon of modern speakers", declaring that the only speaker of the previous 100 years he would rank higher than Pelosi was Sam Rayburn. Catholic University of America political scientist Matthew Green opined that the 111th Congress had "been remarkable in its productivity—in both the number of bills enacted and their scope—and Pelosi shares much of the credit." Green considered Pelosi's tenure as speaker to be among the greatest in U.S. history, highlighting the passage of the Affordable Care Act ("a measure with far-reaching implications for our nation's health care policy"). He also praised Pelosi for occasionally allowing House passage of measures that had majority overall House support but were opposed by the majority of the Democratic House Caucus. He noted that she had occasionally allowed bills to move forward in such fashion despite a high level of political polarization in the United States.

In November 2010, Brian Naylor of NPR opined that:

During Nancy Pelosi's four years as speaker of the House, Congress approved the health care overhaul—widely considered the most significant piece of domestic legislation since Medicare—along with an $800 billion measure to stimulate the economy and a multi-billion-dollar rescue of the banks. It is a legislative legacy that rivals the accomplishments of any speaker in modern times.

In November 2010, after Democrats lost their House majority, Politico writer John Bresnahan called Pelosi's record as speaker "mixed". He opined that Pelosi had been a powerful speaker, describing her as wielding "an iron fist in a Gucci glove" and having held "enormous power within the House Democratic Caucus", but noting that she had a "horrible approval rating with the rest of America". Bresnahan wrote that Pelosi's leadership and the legislative agenda she advanced had significantly contributed to the party's loss of its House majority, citing the Patient Protection and Affordable Care Act as an example of legislation that hurt the Democrats electorally in 2010. Bresnahan also believed that, ahead of the 2010 elections, Pelosi had "disastrously" misread public opinion, and that Pelosi had been a poor orator.

Thomas Mann of the Brookings Institution opined in 2018 that Pelosi had been the "strongest and most effective speaker of modern times" during her first speakership.

In 2018, Robert Draper wrote for The New York Times Magazine:

During Nancy Pelosi's four years as speaker, there was no confusion as to who was in control. Pelosi used the tools at her disposal—committee assignments, campaign donations—to establish a balance among her party's coalitions while also reminding everyone that her job was not simply to officiate and appease...But as Newt Gingrich learned the hard way two decades ago, an autocratic speaker is a short-lived one. Pelosi's reign was successful because she understood the will of her caucus rather than bending it to hers.

Draper also wrote that "for all her mastery of Washington's inside game, Pelosi has never been a deft public-facing politician," and called her a poor orator.

== Second tenure as minority leader (2011–2019) ==
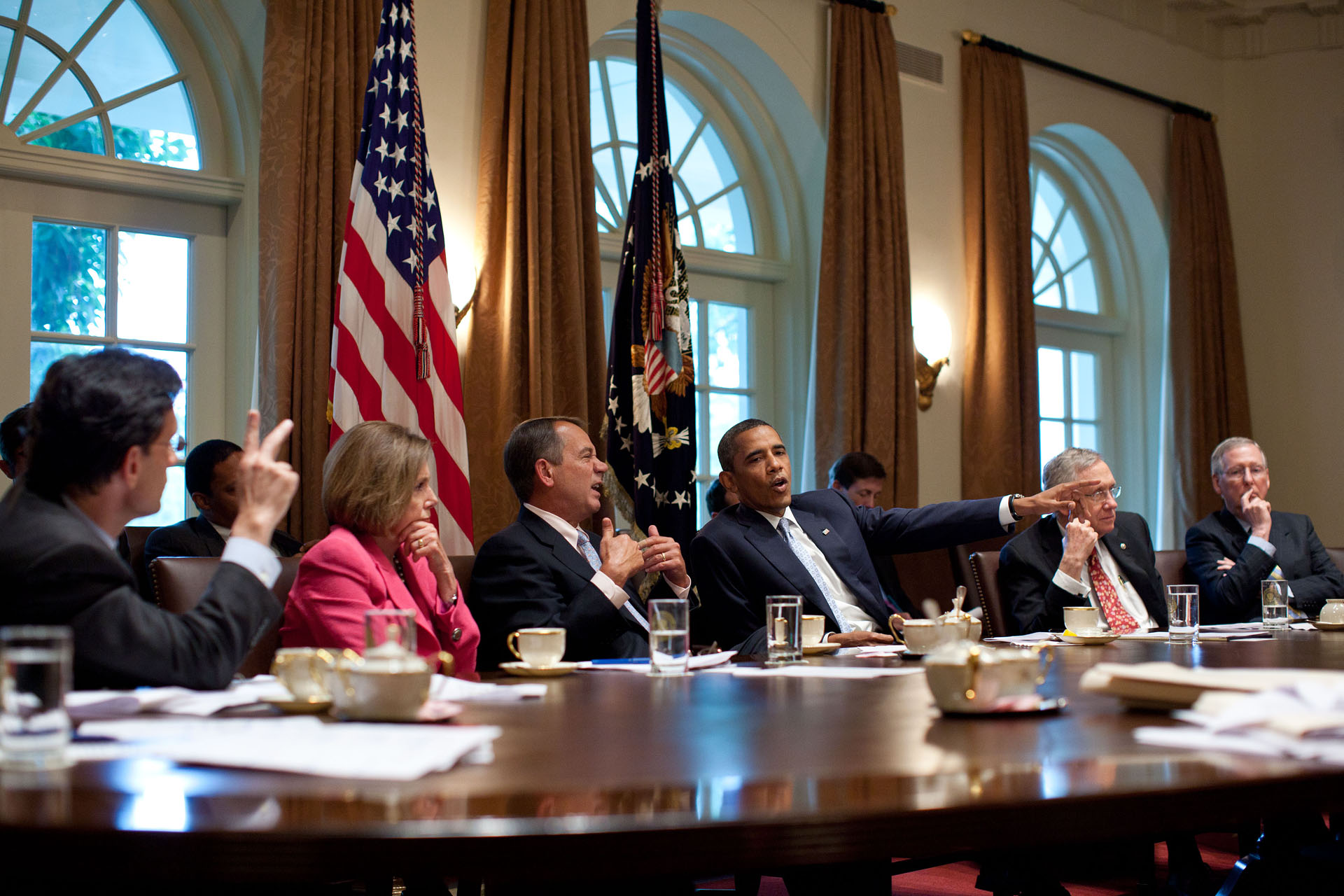
President Barack Obama meets with congressional leadership, July 2011.

=== 112th and 113th Congress ===
Though Pelosi was reelected by a comfortable margin in the 2010 elections, the Democrats lost 63 seats and control of the House of Representatives to the Republicans. After this setback, Pelosi sought to continue leading the House Democratic Caucus as minority leader, the office she held before becoming speaker. Intraparty opposition failed to pass a motion to delay the leadership vote, though she faced a challenge from Representative Heath Shuler. Shuler lost to Pelosi, 150–43, in the caucus vote on November 17, 2010. On the opening day of the 112th Congress, Pelosi was elected minority leader.

In November 2011, 60 Minutes alleged that Pelosi and several other members of Congress had used information they gleaned from closed sessions to make money on the stock market. The program cited her purchases of Visa Inc. stock while a bill that would limit credit card fees was in the House. Pelosi denied the allegations and called the report "a right-wing smear". When the Stop Trading on Congressional Knowledge Act (or STOCK Act) was introduced the next year, she voted for it and lauded its passing. Of representatives Louise Slaughter and Tim Walz, who drafted the bill, Pelosi said they "shined a light on a gaping hole in our ethics laws and helped close it once and for all".

On November 14, 2012, Pelosi announced that she intended to remain Democratic leader.

Pelosi was one of many lawmakers who called for the Washington Redskins to change their name. She said it was time for the U.S. Patent and Trademark Office to step in and tell the National Football League that it could not keep its registered trademark for the "Redskins", a racial slur for Native Americans.

=== 114th and 115th Congress ===
In August 2016, Pelosi said that her personal contact information had been posted online following a cyberattack against top Democratic campaign committees and she had received "obscene and sick calls, voice mails and text messages". She warned members of Congress to avoid letting children or family members answer phone calls or read text messages.

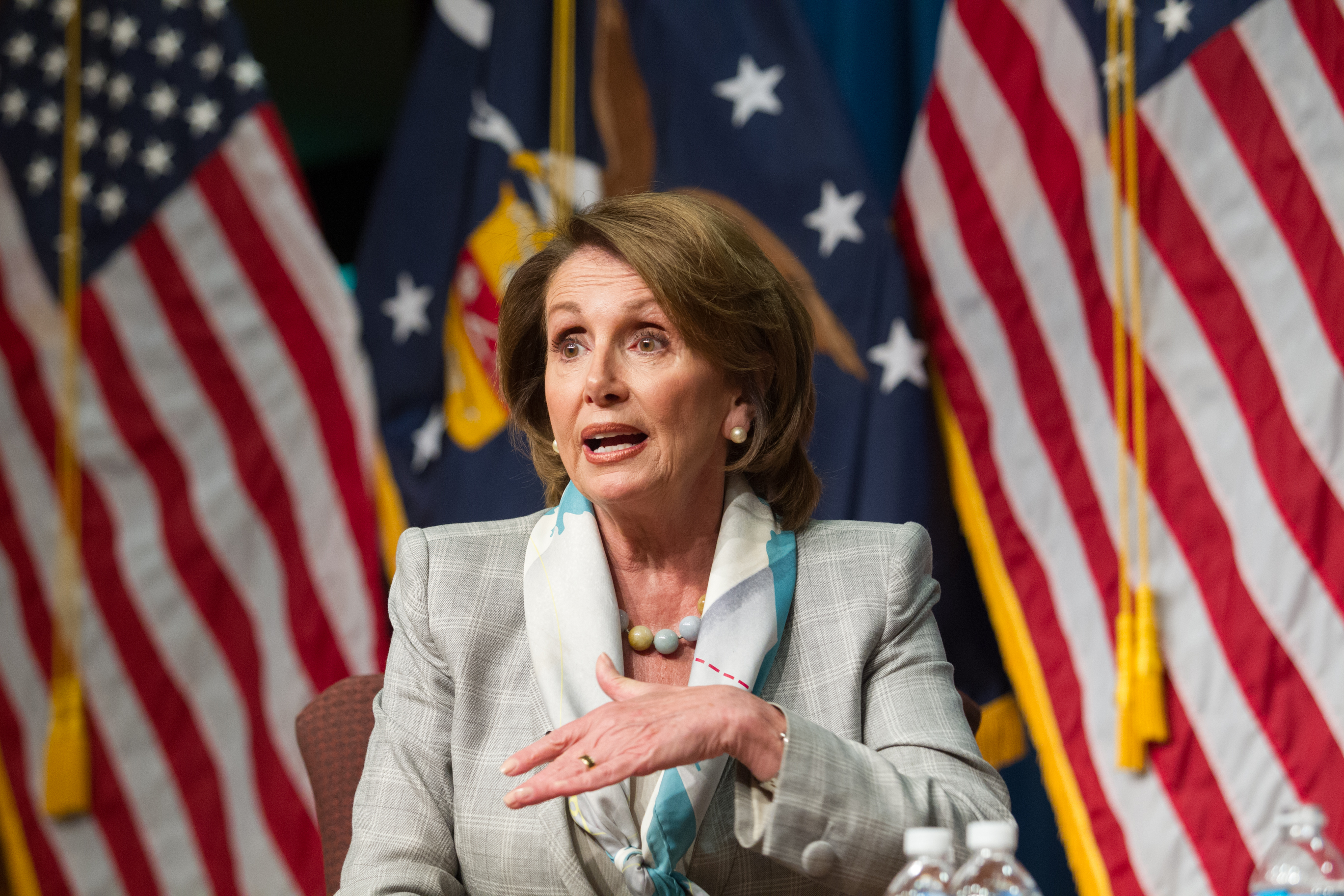
Pelosi speaking at the United States Department of Labor on Equal Pay Day

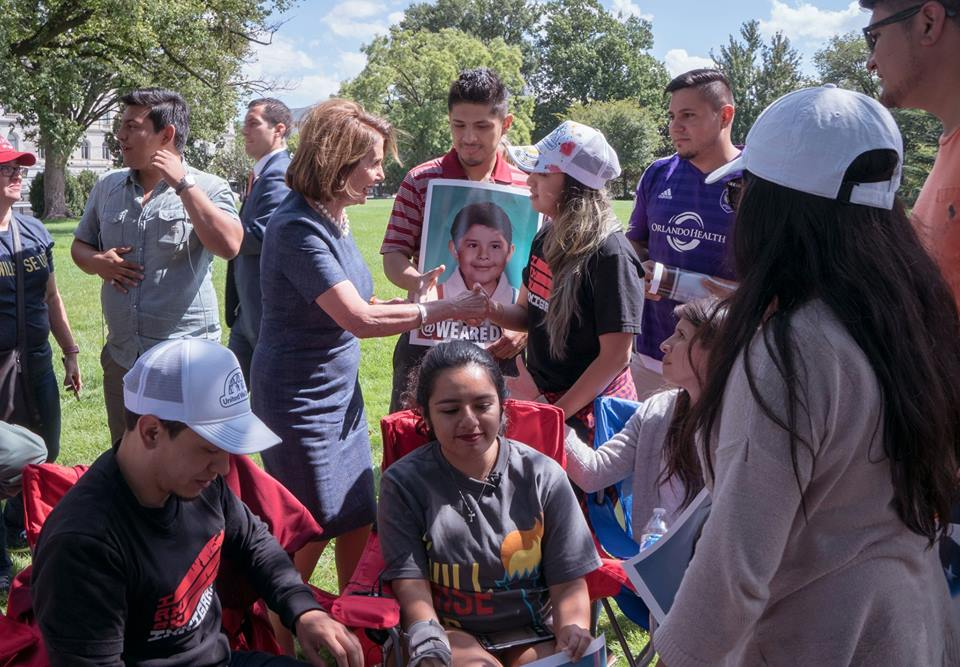
Pelosi greets DREAMers fasting outside the Capitol, September 2017.

At times, centrists, progressive candidates and incumbent Democrats all expressed opposition to Pelosi's continued tenure as the party's House leader.

Prompted by colleagues after the 2016 presidential election, Tim Ryan of Ohio initiated a bid to replace Pelosi as House minority leader on November 17, 2016. After Pelosi agreed to give more leadership opportunities to junior members, she defeated Ryan by a vote of 134–63 on November 30.

In 2017, after Democrats lost four consecutive special elections in the House of Representatives, Pelosi's leadership was again called into question. In June 2017, Representative Kathleen Rice of New York and a small group of other House Democrats, including Congressional Black Caucus chairman Cedric Richmond, held a closed-door meeting to discuss potential new Democratic leadership. Other House Democrats, including Ryan, Seth Moulton, and Filemon Vela, publicly called for new House leadership. In an interview, Rice said, "If you were talking about a company that was posting losing numbers, if you were talking about any sports team that was losing time and time again, changes would be made, right? The CEO out. The coach would be out and there would be a new strategy put in place." In a press conference, Pelosi defended her leadership, saying, "I respect any opinion that my members have but my decision about how long I stay is not up to them." When asked specifically why she should stay on as House minority leader after numerous Democratic seats were lost, she responded, "Well, I'm a master legislator. I am a strategic, politically astute leader. My leadership is recognized by many around the country, and that is why I'm able to attract the support that I do."

In November 2017, after Pelosi called for John Conyers's resignation over allegations of harassment, she convened the first in a series of planned meetings on strategies to address reforming workplace policies in the wake of national attention to sexual harassment. She said Congress had "a moral duty to the brave women and men coming forward to seize this moment and demonstrate real, effective leadership to foster a climate of respect and dignity in the workplace".

In February 2018, Pelosi sent a letter to Speaker Paul Ryan about the proposed public release of a memo prepared by Republican staff at the direction of House Intelligence Committee Chairman Devin Nunes. The memo attacked the Federal Bureau of Investigation for its investigation of Russian interference in the 2016 United States elections. Pelosi said the FBI and the Department of Justice had warned Nunes and Ryan that the memo was inaccurate and that its release could threaten national security by disclosing federal surveillance methods. She added that Republicans were engaged in a "cover-up campaign" to protect Trump: "House Republicans' pattern of obstruction and cover-up to hide the truth about the Trump-Russia scandal represents a threat to our intelligence and our national security. The GOP has led a partisan effort to distort intelligence and discredit the U.S. law enforcement and intelligence communities." She charged Nunes with "deliberately dishonest actions" and called for his immediate removal from his position.

In February 2018, Pelosi broke the record for longest House speech using the "magic minute" custom when she spent more than eight hours recounting stories from DREAMers—people brought to the United States as minors by undocumented immigrants—to object to a budget deal that would raise spending caps without addressing the future of DACA recipients, who were at risk of deportation by the Trump administration.

In May 2018, after the White House invited two Republicans and no Democrats to a Department of Justice briefing on an FBI informant who had made contact with the Trump campaign, Pelosi and Schumer sent a letter to Deputy Attorney General Rod Rosenstein and FBI director Wray calling for "a bipartisan Gang of Eight briefing that involves congressional leadership from both chambers".

In August 2018, Pelosi called for Duncan D. Hunter's resignation after his indictment on charges of misusing at least $250,000 in campaign funds, saying the charges were "evidence of the rampant culture of corruption among Republicans in Washington today".

In April 2018, Peter Beinart wrote in The Atlantic that Pelosi had been "the most effective congressional leader of modern times—and, not coincidentally, the most vilified."

== Second speakership (2019–2023) ==
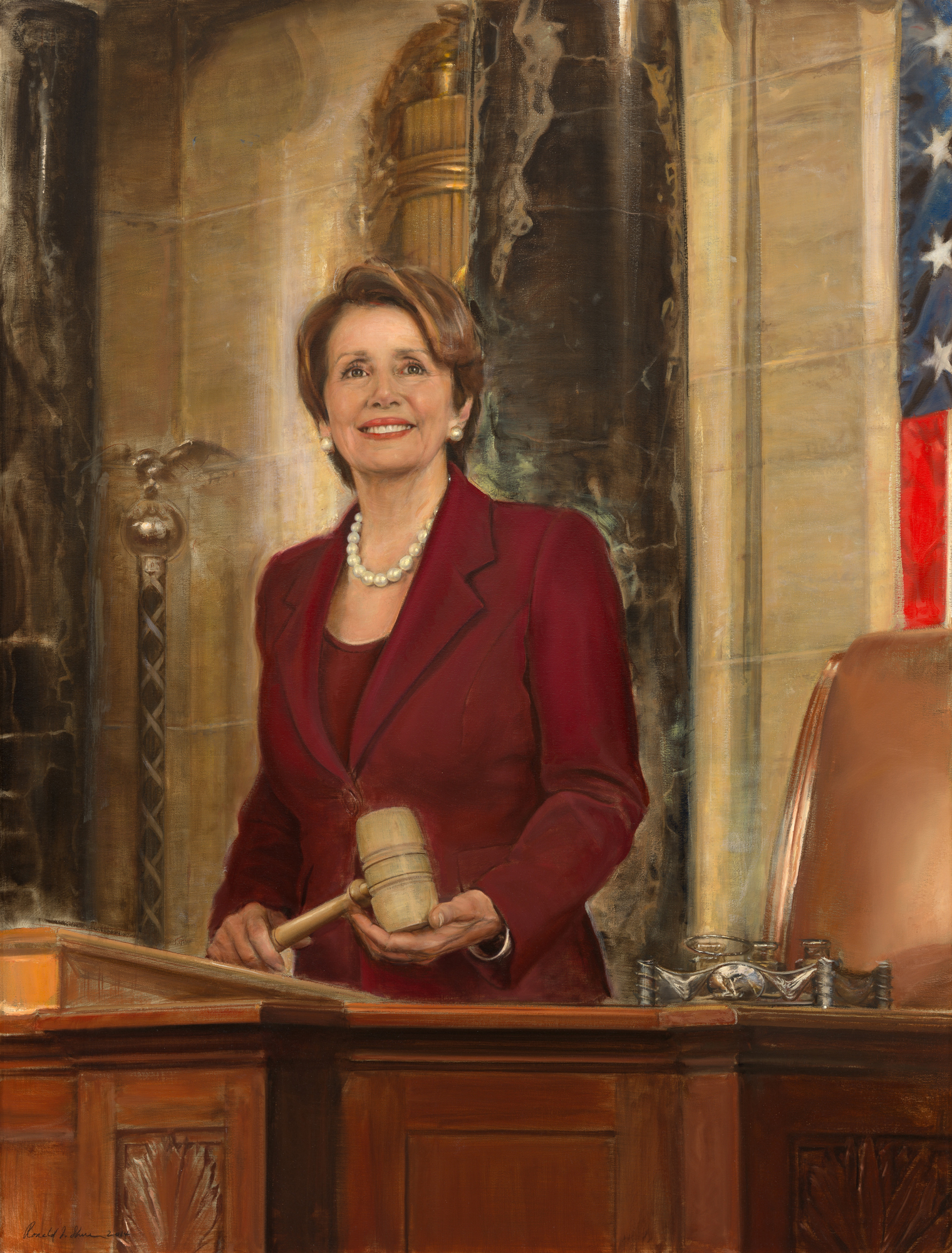
Official painting, 2022 (composed in 2014)

In the 2018 elections, the Democrats recaptured a House majority, gaining 41 seats. This was the party's largest gain in the House since the 1974 post-Watergate elections. On November 28, House Democrats nominated Pelosi to once again serve as speaker. She was reelected to the speakership at the start of the 116th Congress on January 3, 2019. Pelosi "clinched the speakership after weeks of whittling down opposition from some fellow Democrats seeking a new generation of leadership. The deal to win over holdouts put an expiration date on her tenure: she promised not to stay more than four years in the job". 220 House Democrats voted for Pelosi as Speaker and 15 for someone else or no one.

On February 4, 2020, at the conclusion of Trump's State of the Union address, Pelosi tore up her official copy of it. Her stated reason for doing so was "because it was a courteous thing to do considering the alternatives. It was a such a dirty speech". Trump and other Republicans criticized her for this.

In December 2021, Pelosi announced her candidacy for reelection to the House in 2022. In 2018, and again in 2020, she had agreed not to stay on as speaker beyond January 2023, but otherwise avoided questions about her future. In 2022, Pelosi was reelected, but the Democratic Party lost the House majority. Ten days later, she announced that she would not seek a Democratic leadership post in the next Congress.

=== 2018–2019 government shutdown ===
President Donald Trump meets with Pelosi and Senate Minority Leader Chuck Schumer on December 11, 2018, saying "I will be the one to shut it down."

At the start of the 116th Congress, Pelosi opposed Trump's attempts to use the 2018–2019 federal government shutdown (which she called a "hostage-taking" of civil servants) as leverage to build a substantial wall on the U.S.-Mexico border. She declined to allow Trump to give the State of the Union Address in the House chamber while the shutdown was ongoing. After several polls showed Trump's popularity sharply falling due to the shutdown, on January 25, 2019, Trump signed a stopgap bill to reopen the government without any concessions regarding a border wall for three weeks to allow negotiations on an appropriations bill. But he reiterated his demand for border wall funding and said he would shut the government down again or declare a national emergency and use military funding to build the wall if Congress did not appropriate the funds by February 15.

On February 15, Trump declared a national emergency in order to bypass Congress, after being unsatisfied with a bipartisan bill that had passed the House and Senate the day before.

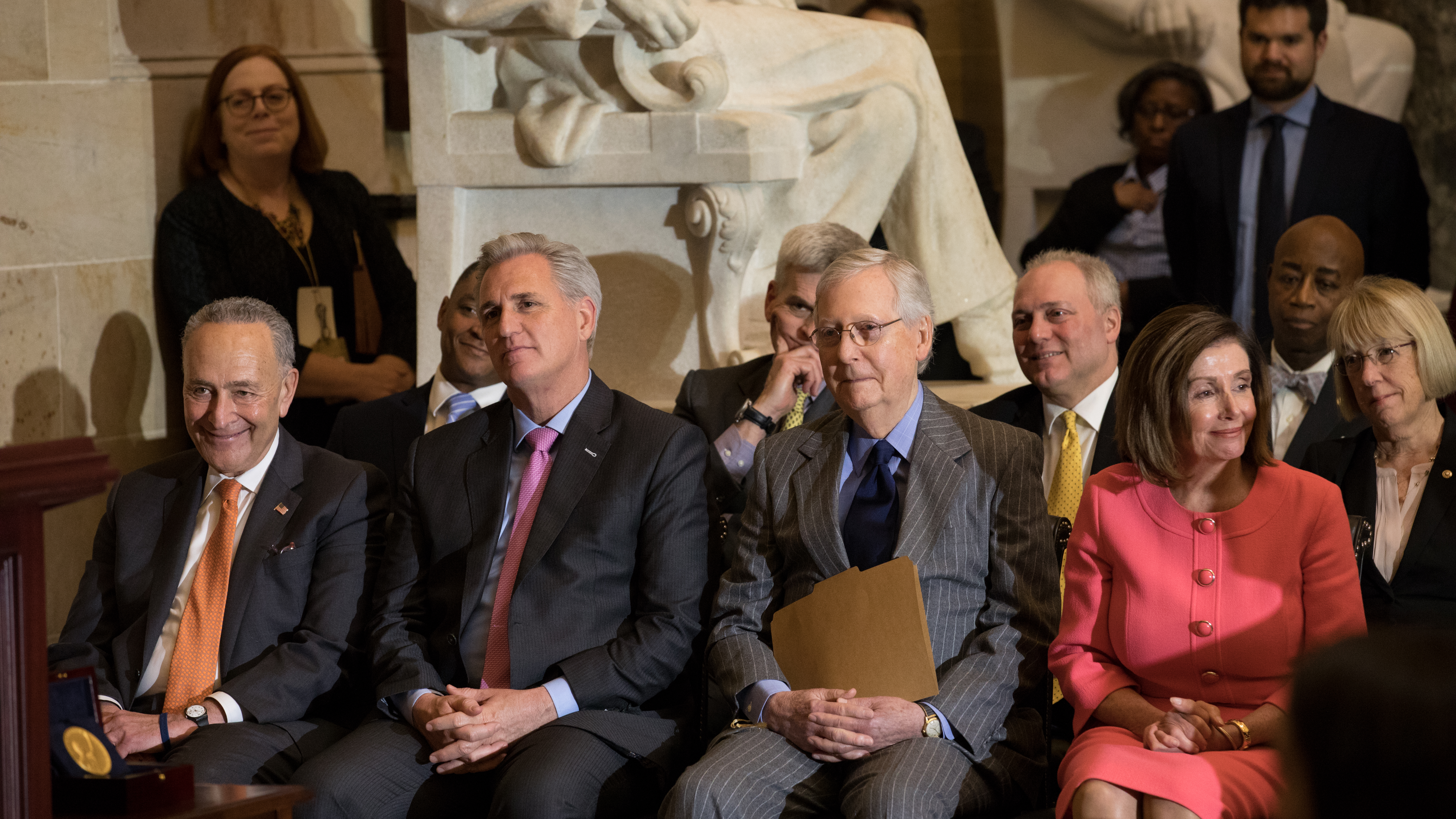
Congressional leaders in January 2020

=== Impeachments of President Trump ===
On September 29, 2019, Pelosi announced the launch of an impeachment inquiry against Trump. On December 5, 2019, after the inquiry had taken place, Pelosi authorized the Judiciary Committee to begin drafting articles of impeachment. After hearings were held, two articles of impeachment were announced on December 10. The House of Representatives approved both articles on December 18, thereby formally impeaching Trump.

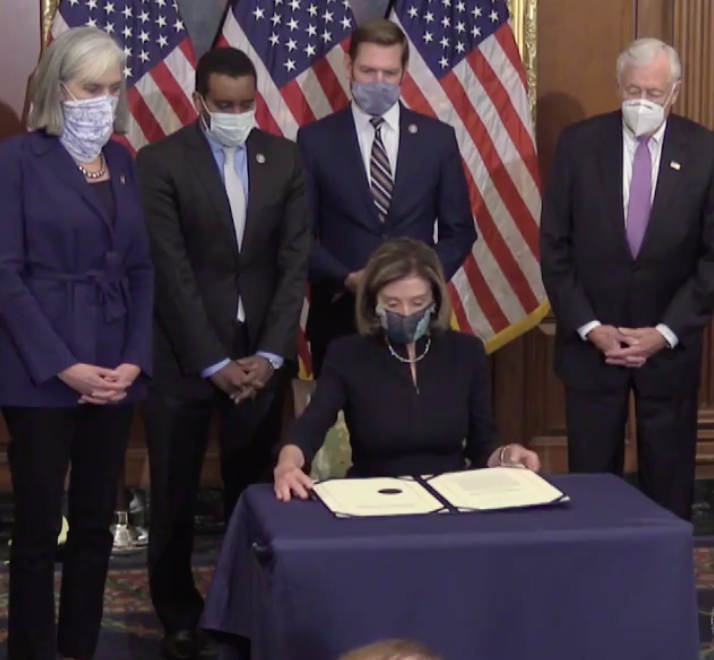
Pelosi signs the article of impeachment for the second impeachment of Donald Trump on January 13, 2021.

During the January 6 United States Capitol attack, Pelosi's laptop and gavel were stolen from her office. They have not been recovered. The day after the attack, Pelosi demanded that Trump either resign or be removed from office through the clauses of section four the Twenty-Fifth Amendment to the United States Constitution, threatening impeachment if this did not happen. On January 10, she told Vice President Mike Pence that if he did not invoke the 25th amendment within 24 hours, she would proceed with legislation to impeach Trump. On January 13, the House voted to impeach Trump a second time.

=== COVID-19 pandemic and response ===
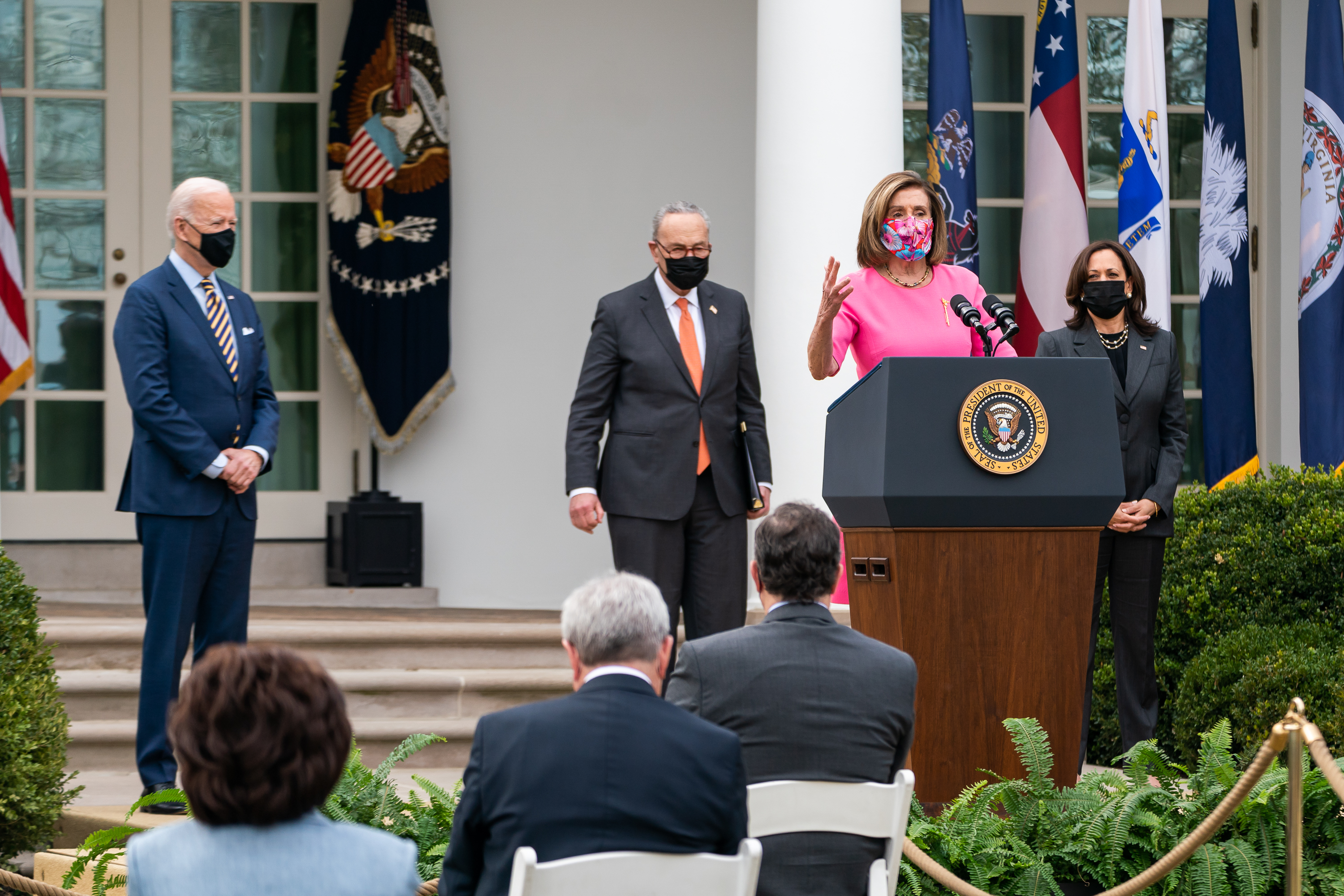
Pelosi delivers remarks on the American Rescue Plan in March 2021.

Pelosi facilitated passage of the CARES Act. She attracted controversy when footage emerged in early September 2020 of her visiting a hair salon in San Francisco. This was contrary to regulations enforced at that time preventing service indoors. Criticized for hypocrisy by Trump and the owners of the salon, Pelosi described the situation as "clearly a setup". Her stylist and other Democrats defended her.

=== Infrastructure bill ===
Pelosi played a key role in the 2021 passage of the Infrastructure Investment and Jobs Act.

The New York Times credited the legislation's passage to Pelosi's decision to adopt a Congressional Black Caucus proposal to pair together the final vote on the bill with a good-faith vote on the rules governing debate on a subsequent social safety net bill. The Times noted that Pelosi did not make herself the public face of this, instead having Congressional Black Caucus Chairwoman Joyce Beatty persuade House Democratic Caucus members to accept the proposal. The New York Times wrote, "in effect, the speaker had harnessed one faction of her unruly Democrats to win over two others." Chris Cillizza of CNN wrote:

Consider the challenge Pelosi faced with this infrastructure bill—starting with the fact that she had only a three-seat majority, meaning that even a handful of renegade Democrats could scuttle the entire thing. Then add in the total lack of trust not only between House liberals and Senate moderates but also the decided lack of trust between House liberals and House moderates. And sprinkle in the fact that the entire bill had been at an impasse for months as both sides of the party wrangled for leverage on the broader $1.75 trillion social safety net legislation.

=== Other notable legislation ===
During the 117th Congress, the CHIPS and Science Act, Inflation Reduction Act, and Honoring our PACT Act of 2022 (PACT Act) were passed.

=== Assessments of second speakership ===
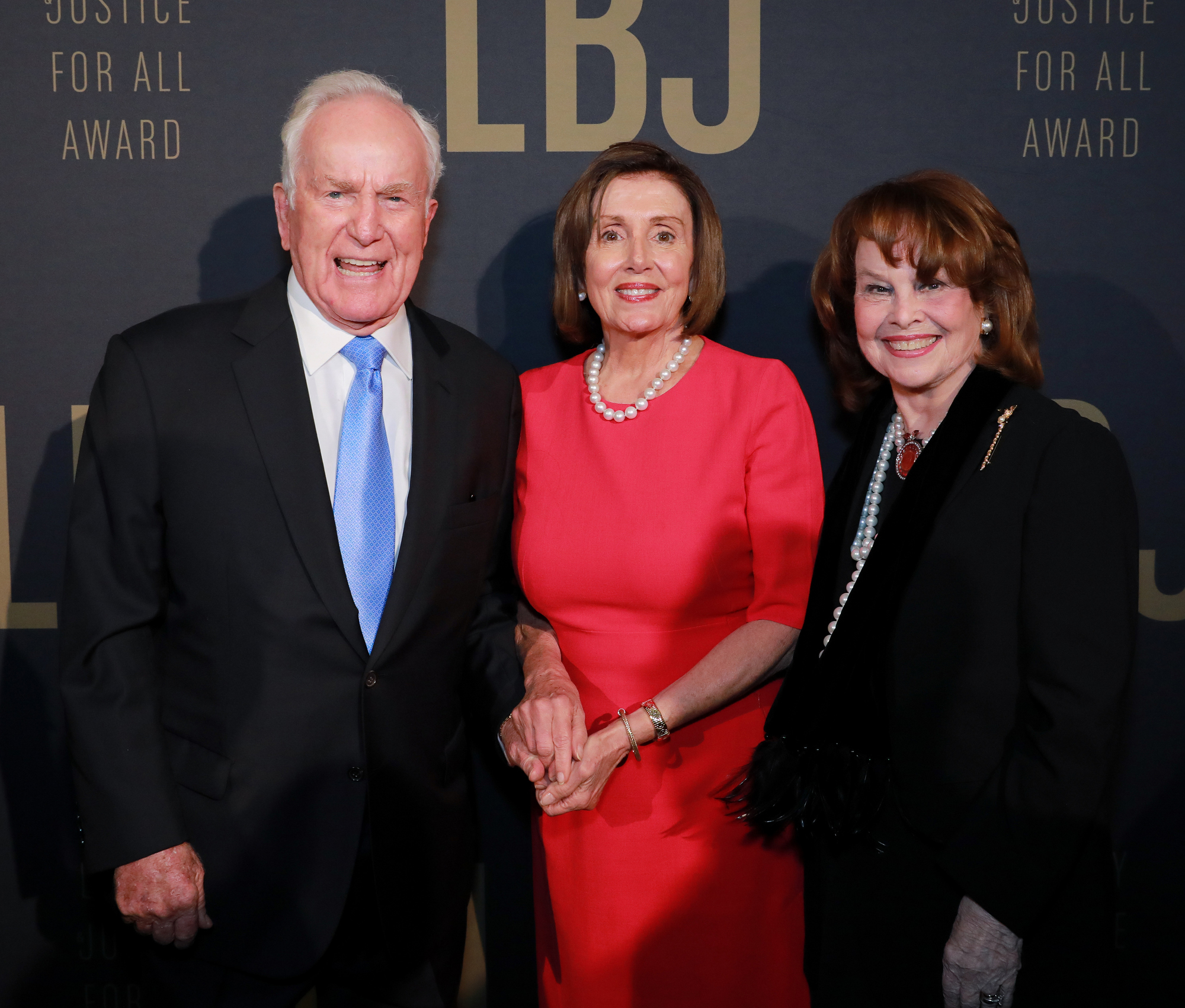
Pelosi (center) with Lloyd Nelson Hand and Ann Hand in 2019

As with her first tenure, experts gave Pelosi's second tenure as speaker high marks, with many opining that during her two tenures as speaker she had been among the most effective individuals to hold the position.

In June 2019, Brent Budowsky opined in The Hill that Pelosi had been "the most important, consequential and effective Speaker since Tip O'Neill" as well as "one of the greatest Speakers who ever served." In January 2020, on the eve of Trump's first impeachment trial before the U.S. Senate, Washington Post political writer Paul Kane called Pelosi the most powerful House speaker in at least 25 years, noting that some historians were comparing her influence to that of former speaker Sam Rayburn. In 2021, former Republican speaker John Boehner opined that Pelosi had been the most powerful House speaker in U.S. history.

In November 2022, Chris Cillizza wrote that Pelosi was "the most effective speaker ever." Johnathan Bernstein opined for The Washington Post and Bloomberg News that Pelosi was "the greatest speaker in history." Jackie Calmes of the Los Angeles Times shared the same opinion. Sarah Ferris of Politico called Pelosi "a legislative giant regarded as one of the most powerful speakers in modern U.S. history." Historian Lindsay M. Chervinsky wrote for NBC News that Pelosi was "one of the most effective speakers in history" and had been so while facing "the double standards that apply to powerful women."

John Haduk wrote for the Brookings Institution:

Whether you agree with her politics or not, it is undeniable that [Pelosi] has been a remarkably effective House leader. That success has come as both House Minority Leader and as Speaker of the House. As Speaker, she has worked with a majority as large as 81 seats in November and December 2009 (258–177) and one as small as 6 seats from April to May 2021 (218–212).

A number of progressive and liberal-leaning outlets published strong assessments of Pelosi's tenure. Harold Meyerson opined that Pelosi had been the greatest speaker in U.S. history in an article in The American Prospect. Amanda Marcotte of Salon.com opined that Pelosi was the greatest speaker of all time, calling her "both the most effective and most progressive House speaker of all time." Marcotte added that Pelosi had been effective "both in terms of managing an unruly caucus and being able to push her party in more progressive directions."

== Post–Democratic leadership (2023–present) ==
On November 29, 2022, the Steering and Policy Committee of the House Democratic Caucus honorarily named Pelosi "speaker emerita" in the upcoming 118th U.S. Congress. Her second speakership, and her participation in the House Democratic Party leadership, concluded on January 3, 2023, at the end of the 117th Congress.

Amid concerns about President Biden's reelection prospects in the 2024 presidential election, Pelosi and other Democratic officials urged him to withdraw his candidacy before the party's National Convention. She feared that his faltering candidacy might not only result in Trump's victory but also have a coattail effect that could bring Democrats defeat in the coinciding House and Senate elections, producing a Republican government trifecta. On July 10, Pelosi said the party encouraged Biden to make the decision because time was running out. He withdrew from the race on July 21 and endorsed Vice President Kamala Harris as the party's presidential nominee. Before Biden withdrew, Pelosi had told other California congressional Democrats that she believed a competitive "open process" should determine the new Democratic candidate. She endorsed Harris within one day. Although Harris did not win any primary elections, Pelosi insisted that the process that led to Harris's nomination was a "primary": "We had an open primary, and she won it. Nobody else got in the race." After Harris lost to Trump, Pelosi blamed Biden's late exit from the race and the lack of an open Democratic primary.

Pelosi is a member of the House Baltic Caucus and the Congressional Equality Caucus.

On November 6, 2025, Pelosi announced she would not seek reelection and would retire from the House of Representatives in 2027.

On October 21, 2026, Pelosi spoke at the Internet Archive in support of the organization and libraries.

On November 10, 2026, Pelosi missed the House vote on the impeachment of Pete Hegseth as Secretary of Defense. Pelosi said she was in California receiving an award from a veterans group.

== Post–political career ==
In 2026, Pelosi announced that she would co-teach a course on Congress with Eric Schickler, a political science professor, at the University of California, Berkeley.

== Political positions ==
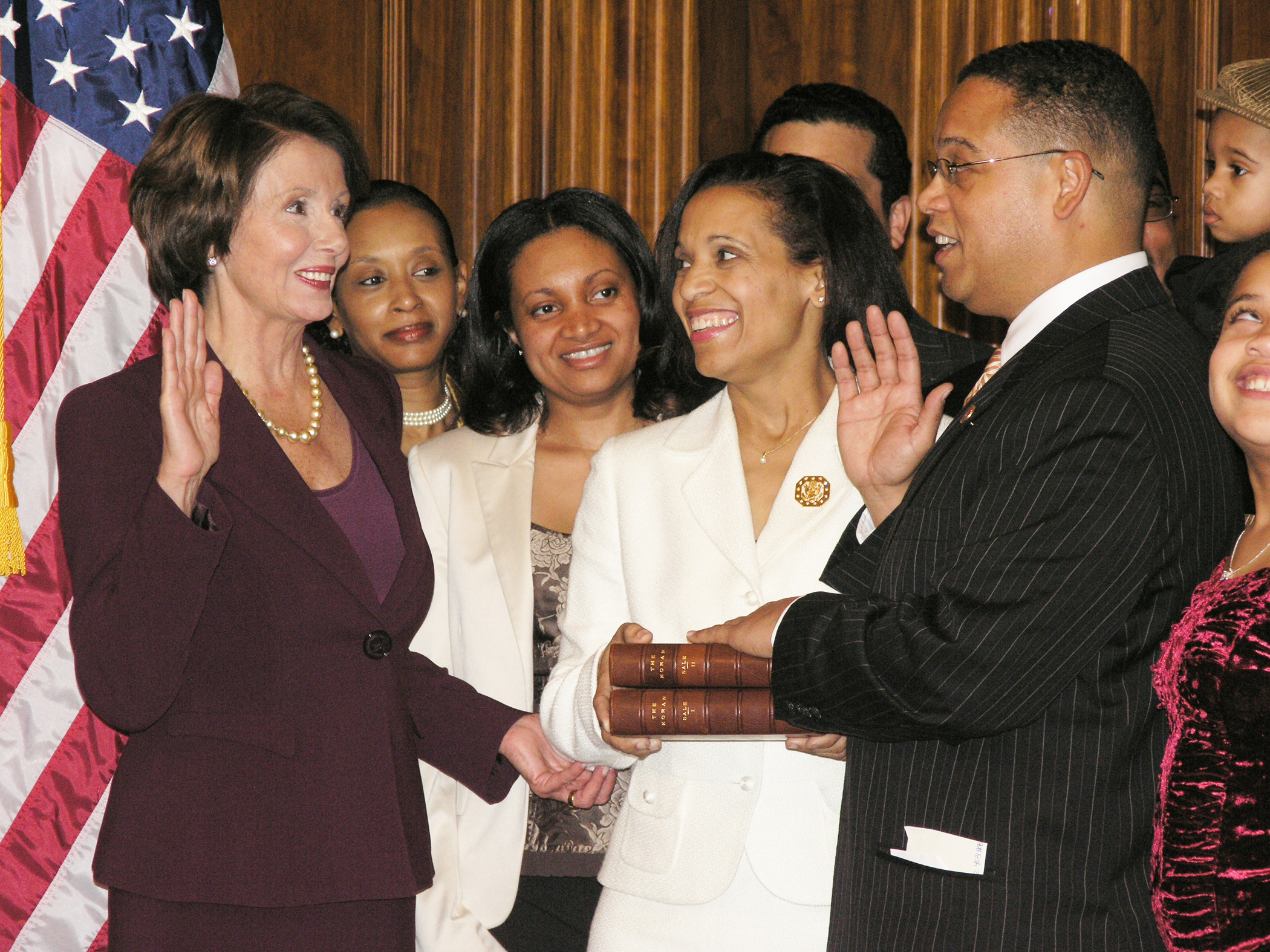
Pelosi and Representative Keith Ellison at his swearing-in ceremony with Thomas Jefferson's Quran in 2007

Pelosi was a founding member of the Congressional Progressive Caucus, which she left in 2003 after being elected House minority leader. She is still widely considered a liberal.

== Public image ==
Pelosi has often been described as a polarizing figure, facing criticism from both the political right and left. Progressives have criticized her for her knowledge of waterboarding and other torture methods during the war on terror, accusing her of not objecting strongly enough to these practices. Conservatives and libertarians have taken issue with her positions on gun rights, viewing her advocacy for gun control as an infringement on Second Amendment rights. They have also criticized her stance on taxation, particularly her support for higher taxes on the wealthy and corporations to fund social programs. Her role in leading the House to impeach President Donald Trump twice has drawn significant criticism from Trump supporters and Republicans, who perceived the impeachments as politically motivated and divisive.

Pelosi has faced allegations of using her position for insider trading, particularly concerning stock transactions that critics claim were influenced by her legislative knowledge. The return on the Pelosis' investment portfolio was 16,930% between 1987 and 2024, which beat the S&P 500 by 581%. Critics have also depicted her as a symbol of the liberal elite, pointing to her strong opposition to populism and comments suggesting that some Americans reject Democratic policies due to their beliefs about "guns, gays, [and] God". During the COVID-19 pandemic, Pelosi was accused of hypocrisy when she had her hair styled at a salon that was supposed to be closed for indoor appointments due to health restrictions, with critics alleging she used her position to receive preferential treatment.

== Electoral history ==
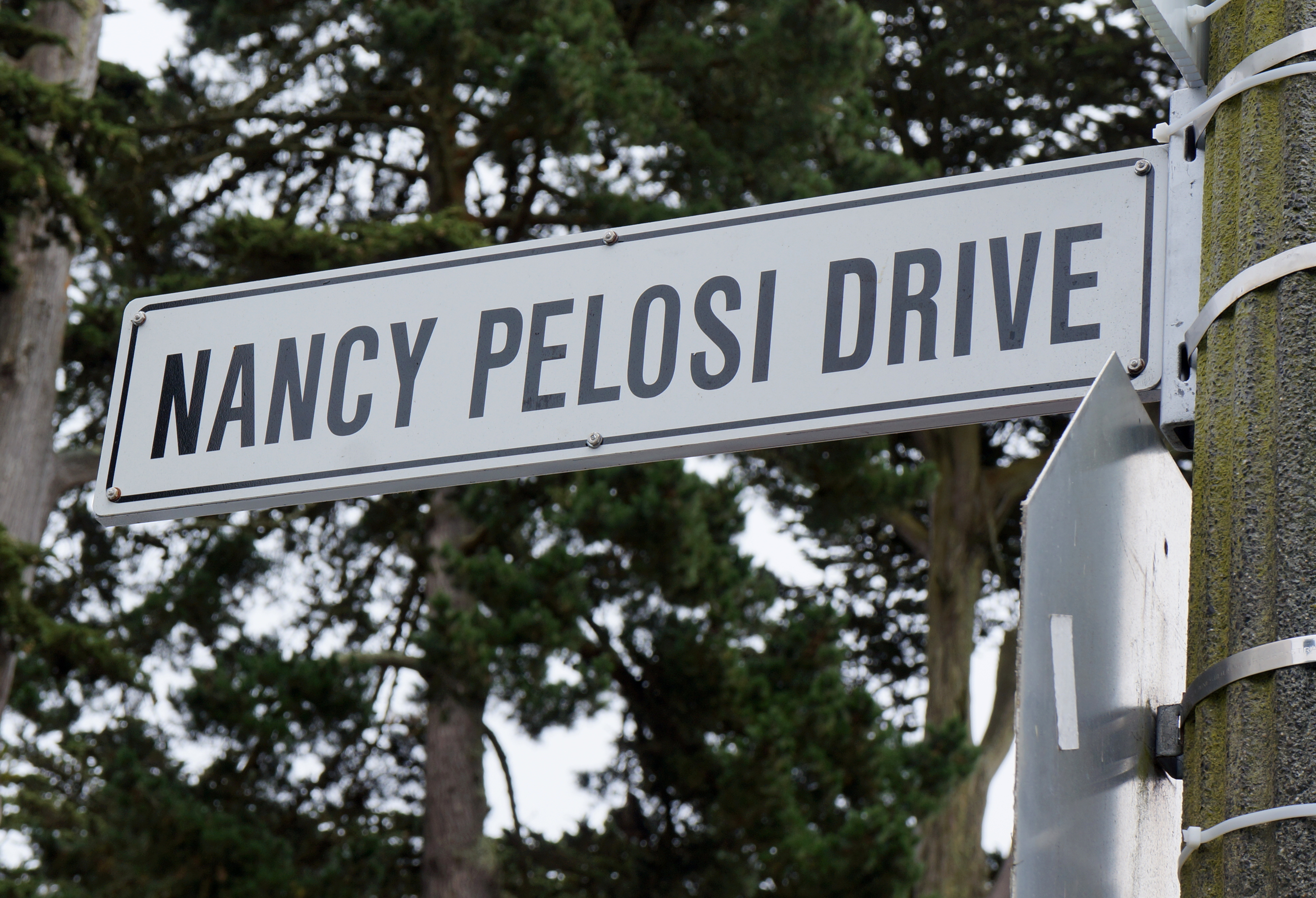
The city of San Francisco named a street in Golden Gate Park in honor of Pelosi after her many years representing the city in Congress.

Pelosi's only close race so far has been in the special election to succeed U.S. representative Sala Burton after her death in February 1987. Pelosi defeated San Francisco supervisor Harry Britt in the Democratic primary with 36 percent of the vote to his 32 percent, then Republican Harriet Ross by more than 2-to-1. Since then, Pelosi has enjoyed overwhelming support in her political career, collecting 76 and 77 percent of the vote in California's 5th congressional district 1988 and 1990. In 1992, after the redistricting from the 1990 census, Pelosi ran in California's 8th congressional district, which now covered the San Francisco area. She has continued to post landslide victories since, dropping beneath 80 percent of the vote only four times in general elections since 1992. After redistricting from the 2010 census, Pelosi ran in California's 12th congressional district, which she represented for the next decade. Due to the 2020 United States redistricting cycle from the 2020 census, Pelosi now represents California's 11th congressional district, which covers San Francisco.

Electoral history of Adam Gray
Year	Office		Party	Primary			General			Result	Swing	Ref.
Year	Office		Party	Total	%	P.	Total	%	P.	Result	Swing	Ref.
1987	U.S. House of Representatives	5th	Democratic	38,927	36.12	1st	46,428	63.36	1st	Won	Hold	
1988	U.S. House of Representatives	5th	Democratic	74,170	100	1st	133,530	76.41	1st	Won	Hold	
1990	U.S. House of Representatives	5th	Democratic	68,453	100	1st	120,633	77.18	1st	Won	Hold	
1992	U.S. House of Representatives	8th	Democratic	81,753	100	1st	191,906	82.47	1st	Won	Hold	
1994	U.S. House of Representatives	8th	Democratic	66,247	92.37	1st	137,642	81.85	1st	Won	Hold	
1996	U.S. House of Representatives	8th	Democratic	54,318	100	1st	175,216	75.67	1st	Won	Hold	
1998	U.S. House of Representatives	8th	Democratic	106,001	100	1st	148,027	85.83	1st	Won	Hold	
2000	U.S. House of Representatives	8th	Democratic	109,246	100	1st	181,847	84.41	1st	Won	Hold	
2002	U.S. House of Representatives	8th	Democratic	65,949	93.10	1st	127,684	79.58	1st	Won	Hold	
2004	U.S. House of Representatives	8th	Democratic	94,564	100	1st	224,017	82.95	1st	Won	Hold	
2006	U.S. House of Representatives	8th	Democratic	77,976	100	1st	148,435	80.39	1st	Won	Hold	
2008	U.S. House of Representatives	8th	Democratic	83,510	89.21	1st	204,996	71.87	1st	Won	Hold	
2010	U.S. House of Representatives	8th	Democratic	77,175	100	1st	167,957	80.10	1st	Won	Hold	
2012	U.S. House of Representatives	12th	Democratic	89,446	74.88	1st	253,709	85.08	1st	Won	Hold	
2014	U.S. House of Representatives	12th	Democratic	79,816	73.61	1st	160,067	83.25	1st	Won	Hold	
2016	U.S. House of Representatives	12th	Democratic	169,537	78.11	1st	274,035	80.87	1st	Won	Hold	
2018	U.S. House of Representatives	12th	Democratic	141,365	68.50	1st	275,292	86.82	1st	Won	Hold	
2020	U.S. House of Representatives	12th	Democratic	190,590	74.03	1st	275,292	77.63	1st	Won	Hold	
2022	U.S. House of Representatives	11th	Democratic	133,798	71.65	1st	220,848	83.95	1st	Won	Hold	
2024	U.S. House of Representatives	11th	Democratic	138,285	73.27	1st	274,796	81.03	1st	Won	Hold	
Source: Secretary of State of California | Statewide Election Results

== Personal life ==
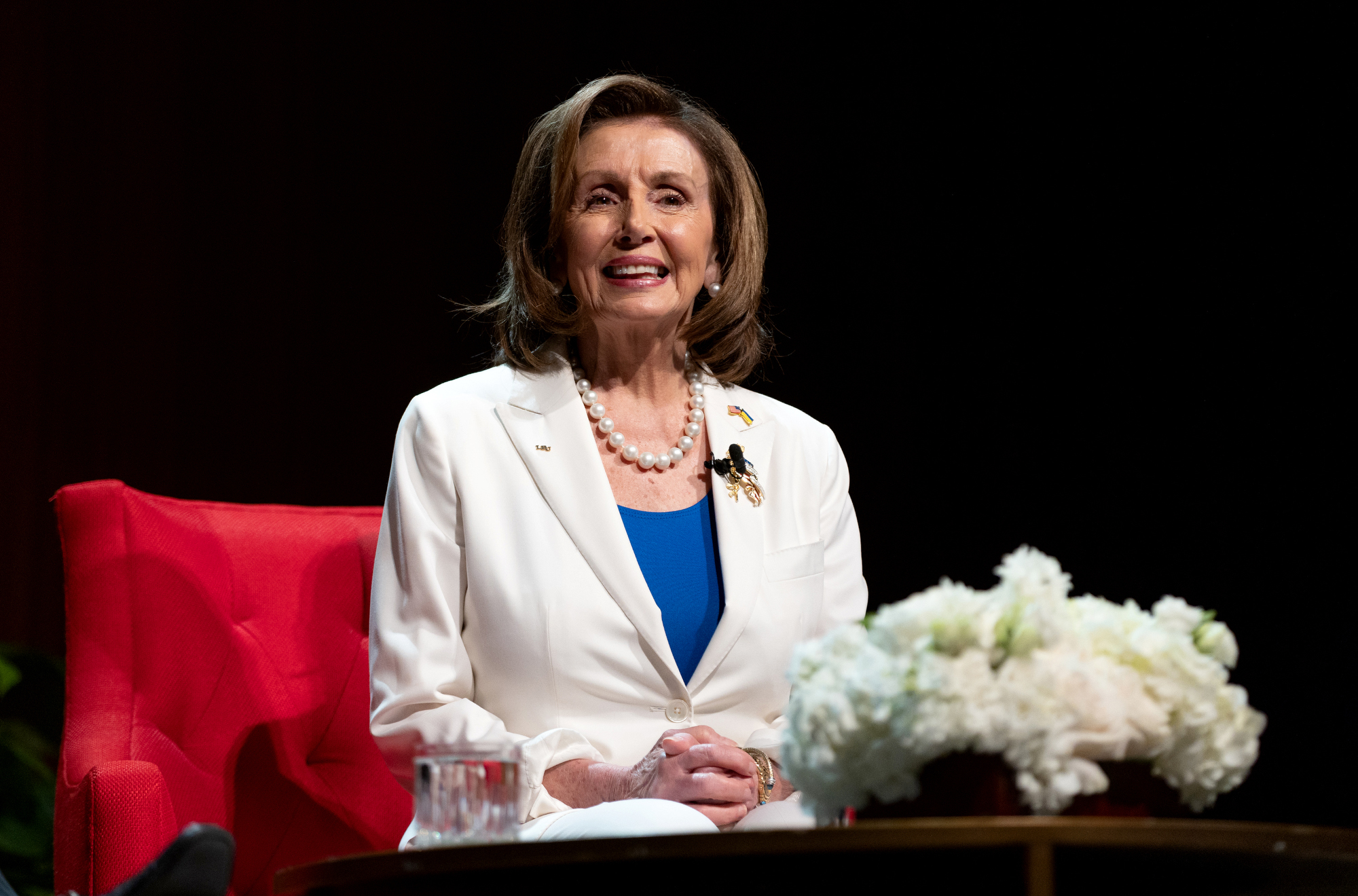
Pelosi at the LBJ Presidential Library in 2022

Nancy D'Alesandro met Paul Francis Pelosi while she was attending college. They married in Baltimore at the Cathedral of Mary Our Queen on September 7, 1963. They then moved to New York, followed by a move to San Francisco in 1969, where her husband's brother Ronald Pelosi was a member of the City and County of San Francisco's Board of Supervisors.

Nancy and Paul Pelosi have five children, including Christine and Alexandra, and nine grandchildren. Alexandra, a journalist, covered the Republican presidential campaigns in 2000 and made a film about the experience, Journeys with George. In 2007, Christine published a book, Campaign Boot Camp: Basic Training for Future Leaders.

Pelosi resides in the Pacific Heights neighborhood of San Francisco. Her 2016 financial disclosure report lists among her assets a combined home and vineyard in St. Helena, California, two commercial buildings in San Francisco, and a townhouse in Loomis, California. In January 2021, her San Francisco home was vandalized with graffiti, messages of "[c]ancel rent" were left on her garage, along with fake blood and a severed pig's head.

=== Financial status ===
Pelosi's husband, Paul, is a wealthy investor and the primary source of the couple's wealth. In 2009, OpenSecrets estimated Pelosi's net worth at $58 million, making her the 13th-wealthiest member of Congress. Business Insider reported that Pelosi's net worth was $26.4 million in 2012 and made her the 13th-richest member of Congress. In 2014, OpenSecrets reported Pelosi's net worth had almost doubled, to about $101 million, making her the eighth-richest. In 2018, Roll Call estimated Pelosi's net worth at $16.0 million, making her the 30th-richest member. As of 2021, Pelosi's net worth was valued at $120 million, making her the sixth-richest person in Congress.

==== Stock trading ====
Roll Call said Pelosi's earnings are connected to her husband's heavy investments in stocks that include Apple, Disney, Comcast and Facebook. Roll Call reported that the couple have $13.46 million in liabilities including mortgages on seven properties. According to Roll Call, Pelosi and her husband hold properties "worth at least $23 million, including a St. Helena vineyard in Napa Valley worth at least $5 million."

According to journalist Glenn Greenwald, the Pelosis have traded $33 million worth of tech stocks over the past two years, including Apple, Amazon, Microsoft, Facebook, and Google stocks. In May and June 2021, Pelosi's husband purchased stocks in tech companies such as Alphabet, Amazon, and Apple, netting a gain of $5.3 million. This occurred even while Speaker Pelosi was working on anti-trust legislation to better regulate the tech industry. The CEO of Apple, Tim Cook, had called Pelosi to lobby her in opposition to the new regulations. Pelosi opposes increasing regulations on stock trades by members of congress, stating that "we're a free market economy" and congresspeople "should be able to participate in that." This comment drew strong criticism, including from Democrats who favor banning stock trades by members of Congress.

Pelosi has faced scrutiny over her family's stock trading activities, particularly after reports indicated that her investment portfolio achieved a 54% return in 2024, outperforming many hedge funds and the S&P 500. Critics argue that members of Congress, including Pelosi, may have access to non-public information that could benefit personal investments, despite the STOCK Act of 2012, which prohibits insider trading by lawmakers.

In July 2024, Pelosi's husband, Paul Pelosi, sold between $500,000 and $1 million worth of Visa stock shortly before the Department of Justice filed an antitrust lawsuit against the company. This transaction drew allegations of potential insider trading. Pelosi's spokesperson said she does not own individual stocks and was not involved in her husband's investment decisions. No formal investigation or charges have been announced as of 2025.

The incident intensified bipartisan calls for new legislation banning stock trading by members of Congress and their immediate families. In response, Senator Josh Hawley reintroduced the Preventing Elected Leaders from Owning Securities and Investments (PELOSI) Act in early 2025.

=== Involvement in Italian-American community ===
Pelosi is a board member of the National Organization of Italian American Women. She served for 13 years as a board member of the National Italian American Foundation (NIAF). In 2007, she received the NIAF Special Achievement Award for Public Advocacy and remains involved in the foundation.

=== Catholic church ===
Pelosi considers herself a "devout Catholic", but has had numerous disagreements with members of the church hierarchy over gay rights, abortion, contraception, and in vitro fertilization. She has said that her biggest disappointment was the church's lobbying against the Affordable Care Act because of contraception coverage.

Pelosi and Catholic bishops have also disagreed about abortion rights. Although she thought it was "lovely" that she had five children in a little over six years, she argued, "It's a woman's right to make her own choices with her family, her God, her doctor."

On May 20, 2022, Salvatore Cordileone, archbishop of San Francisco, announced that Pelosi would be barred from receiving Holy Communion because of her support of pro-choice abortion policies. Cordileone had communicated his concerns on April 7, 2022, writing, "should you not publicly repudiate your advocacy for abortion 'rights' or else refrain from referring to your Catholic faith in public and receiving Holy Communion, I would have no choice but to make a declaration, in keeping with Canon 915, that you are not to be admitted to Holy Communion."

On June 29, 2022, Pelosi received Communion at a Papal Mass presided over by Pope Francis in Rome at St. Peter's Basilica.

=== Home invasion ===
In October 2022, while Pelosi was in Washington, D.C., an intruder entered her San Francisco home demanding to know her whereabouts, and attacked her husband, Paul Pelosi, with a hammer. The assailant, David DePape, was convicted on federal and state charges and sentenced to life without parole.

=== Health ===
In December 2024, Pelosi was hospitalized after fracturing her hip while falling down stairs in high heels during an official trip to Luxembourg. She was there as part of a bipartisan congressional delegation to observe the 80th anniversary of the Battle of the Bulge. On December 14, she underwent hip replacement surgery at Landstuhl Regional Medical Center, a U.S. military hospital in Germany.

== Books ==
- Pelosi, Nancy; Hearth, Amy Hill (July 29, 2008). Know Your Power: A Message to America's Daughters (1st ed.). New York: Doubleday. ISBN 9780385525862. OCLC 259266145. At the Internet Archive (registration required).
- Pelosi, Nancy (August 6, 2024). The Art of Power: My Story as America's First Woman Speaker of the House. New York: Simon & Schuster. ISBN 9781668048047. OCLC 1449552548.

== See also ==
- Electoral history of Nancy Pelosi
- List of female speakers of legislatures in the United States
- Women in the United States House of Representatives

== Notes ==
Party political offices
Preceded by Richard O'Neill	Chair of the California Democratic Party; 1981–1983	Succeeded by Peter Kelly
Preceded by David Bonior	House Democratic Deputy Leader; 2002–2003	Succeeded by Steny Hoyer
Preceded by Dick Gephardt	House Democratic Leader; 2003–2023	Succeeded by Hakeem Jeffries
Preceded by Bill Richardson	Permanent Chair of the Democratic National Convention; 2008	Succeeded by Antonio Villaraigosa
U.S. House of Representatives
Preceded by Sala Burton	Member of the U.S. House of Representatives from California's 5th congressional district 1987–1993	Succeeded by Bob Matsui
Preceded by Ron Dellums	Member of the U.S. House of Representatives from California's 8th congressional district 1993–2013	Succeeded by Paul Cook
Preceded by Norm Dicks	Ranking Member of the House Intelligence Committee; 1999–2003	Succeeded by Jane Harman
Preceded by David Bonior	House Minority Whip; 2002–2003	Succeeded by Steny Hoyer
New office	Ranking Member of the House Homeland Security Committee; 2002–2003	Succeeded by Jim Turner
Preceded by Dick Gephardt	House Minority Leader; 2003–2007	Succeeded by John Boehner
Preceded by John Boehner	House Minority Leader; 2011–2019	Succeeded by Kevin McCarthy
Preceded by Jackie Speier	Member of the U.S. House of Representatives from California's 12th congressional district 2013–2023	Succeeded by Barbara Lee
Preceded by Mark DeSaulnier	Member of the U.S. House of Representatives from California's 11th congressional district 2023–present	Incumbent
Political offices
Preceded by Dennis Hastert	Speaker of the U.S. House of Representatives; 2007–2011	Succeeded by John Boehner
Preceded by Paul Ryan	Speaker of the U.S. House of Representatives; 2019–2023	Succeeded by Kevin McCarthy
U.S. order of precedence (ceremonial)
Preceded by Marcy Kaptur	United States representatives by seniority 5th	Succeeded by Frank Pallone
Preceded by Marcy Kaptur	Order of precedence of the United States	Succeeded by Frank Pallone
