= The Art of Power =

Book by Nancy Pelosi

The Art of Power: My Story as America's First Woman Speaker of the House
- Author: Nancy Pelosi
- Language: English
- Subject: American politics
- Genre: Government
- Published: August 6, 2024
- Publisher: Simon & Schuster
- Publication place: United States
- Media type: Hardcover
- Pages: 352
- ISBN: 978-1-6680-4804-7
- OCLC: 1449552548
- Preceded by: Know Your Power

The Art of Power: My Story as America's First Woman Speaker of the House is a non-fiction book authored by U.S. representative Nancy Pelosi, the Speaker of the US House of Representatives from 2007-2011 and 2019-2023. The Art of Power was published by Simon & Schuster on August 6, 2024. In interviews promoting the book, Pelosi stated that the book is not a memoir, but rather, observations from someone who participated in some of the most consequential moments in America. Prior to The Art of Power, Pelosi wrote Know Your Power: A Message to America's Daughters (2008), a motivational memoir.

== Reception ==
Writing for The Washington Post, Frances Stead Sellers praised the work as giving the reader "insights into the enduring effectiveness of Pelosi's leadership strategy", including a behind the scenes look at some of the most consequential events in politics. Sellers, however, noted Pelosi's tendency for "brushing over the issues she has been criticized for”, like the trading of stocks while in a position of power.

Rachel Cooke of The Guardian appreciated the breadth of Pelosi's observations and her ability to see both the good and the bad in her political opponents; Cook also wrote that "Pelosi isn't much interested in self-criticism; nor does her book explain, even slightly, how an 84-year-old woman continues to exert such influence on the Democratic party".
