= Ann Hand =

American jewelry designer

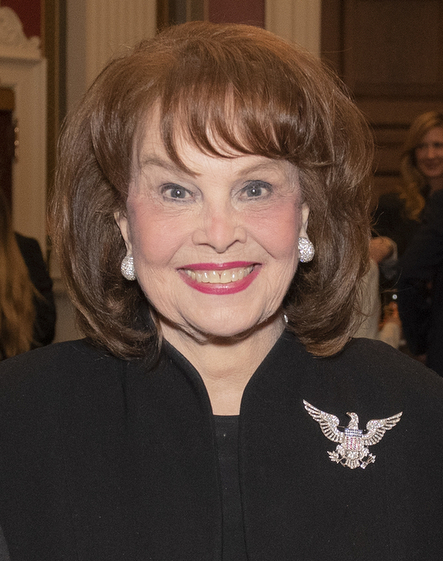
- Hand in 2020
- Education: University of Texas at Austin
- Occupations: jewelry designer businesswoman
- Spouse: Lloyd Nelson Hand
- Children: 5
- Website: annhand.com

Ann Hand is an American jewelry designer and businesswoman. In 1988, she founded the jewelry company Ann Hand LLC. She is married to Lloyd Nelson Hand, who served as the Chief of Protocol of the United States under President Lyndon B. Johnson.

== Early life and education ==
Hand grew up in Houston and attended the University of Texas at Austin, where she studied opera.

== Career ==
Hand is the founder of Ann Hand LLC, a jewelry design company that she founded in 1988. The company is based in the Georgetown, Washington, D.C. Her designs gained notoriety in 1993 after Hand designed a custom pin for Colleen O'Brien Nunn, the wife of Democratic Senator Sam Nunn, to commemorate the unveiling of a restored Statue of Freedom at the U.S. Capitol Building. Hand's jewelry became popular with high-ranking U.S. politicians and diplomats, and their spouses, including Madeleine Albright and Hillary Clinton. She designed custom jewelry and gifts for the White House, the Congressional Medal of Honor Society, the U.S. State Department, the U.S. Department of Defense, the U.S. Department of Justice, the Central Intelligence Agency, the North Atlantic Treaty Organization, the United Space Alliance, the Boy Scouts of America, the American Red Cross, the United Service Organizations, the National Trust for Historic Preservation, The Smithsonian, The Heritage Foundation, ExxonMobil, the Lockheed Corporation and QVC. She also designed pieces for the Lyndon Baines Johnson Library and Museum, the Richard Nixon Presidential Library and Museum, the Ronald Reagan Presidential Library, and the Clinton Presidential Center.

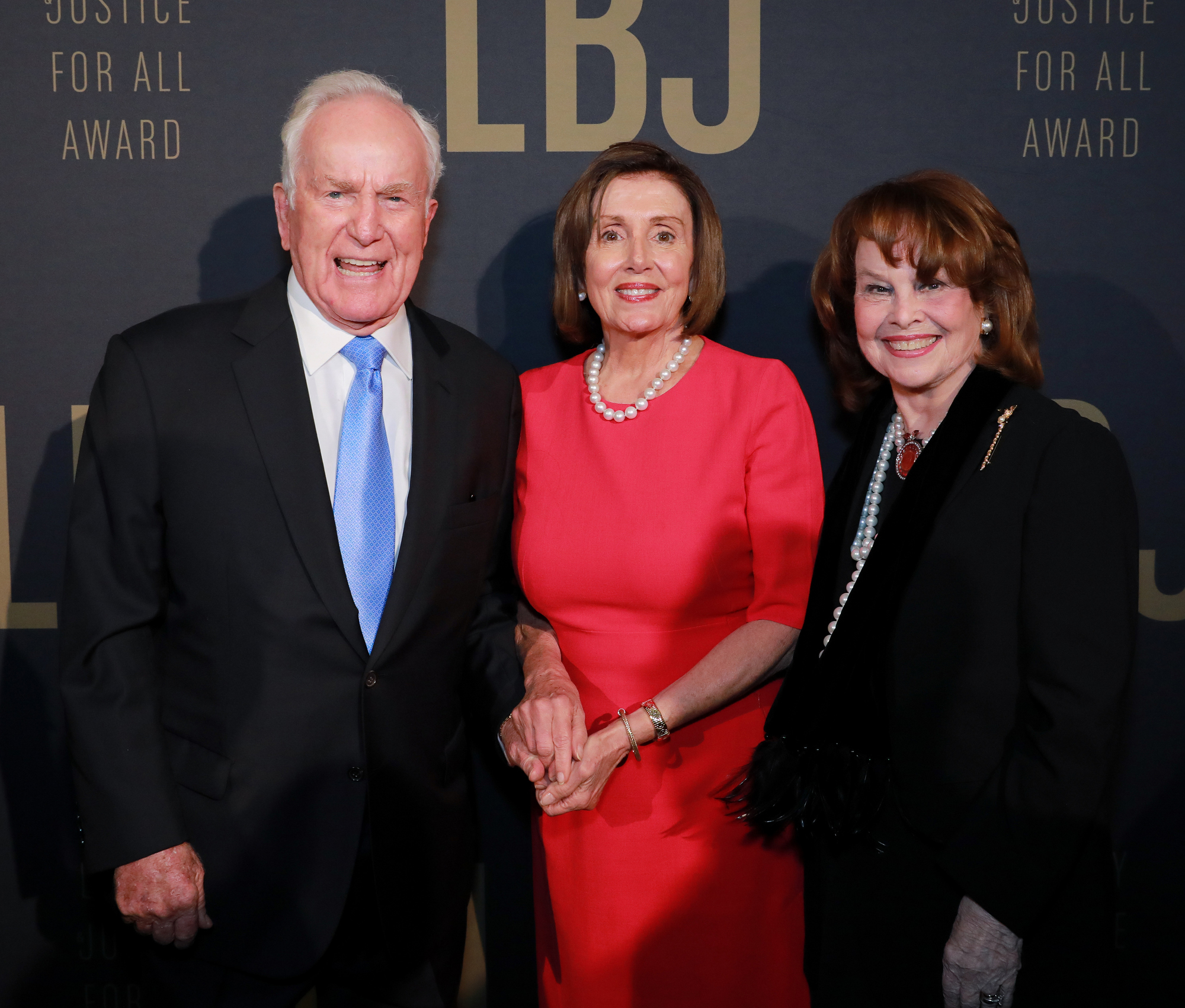
Hand (right) with her husband and Nancy Pelosi in 2019

In 2007, Hand designed a line of jewelry for Miss America. In 2017, she created jewelry for the inauguration of Donald Trump. Her company faced a boycott following the launch of her Trump jewelry. She previously designed jewelry for the inauguration of Barack Obama.

== Personal life ==
She is married to Lloyd Nelson Hand, an attorney who served as Chief of Protocol of the United States under President Lyndon B. Johnson. They have five children. One of her sons died in a car accident.

She moved to Washington, D.C. in 1965 for her husband's appointment in the Johnson administration.
