= Lloyd Nelson Hand =

American politician

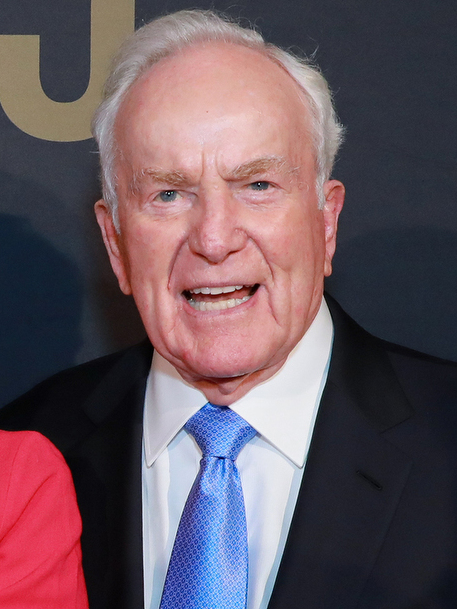
- Hand in 2019

11th Chief of Protocol of the United States
- In office January 21, 1965 – March 21, 1966
- President: Lyndon B. Johnson
- Preceded by: Angier Biddle Duke
- Succeeded by: James W. Symington

Personal details
- Born: Lloyd Nelson Hand; 31 January 1929 (age 97) Alton, Illinois, U.S.
- Party: Democratic Party
- Spouse: Ann Hand
- Children: 5
- Education: University of Texas at Austin

Lloyd Nelson Hand (born January 31, 1929) is an American lawyer and former political aide who served as the 11th Chief of Protocol of the United States in the 1960s. Prior to that, he was an assistant to then-Senate Majority Leader Lyndon B. Johnson and served as a state coordinator for his presidential campaign.

== Early life ==
Hand was born in Alton, Illinois and received a B.A. degree and a law degree at the University of Texas at Austin, where he served as president of the university's student body in 1950-51 and attracted the attention of Johnson, who was serving in the U.S. Senate. Hand went on to serve 3.5 years in the U.S. Navy during the Korean War and was discharged as a lieutenant.

== Career ==
From 1957 to 1961, Hand served as a staff assistant to Johnson while he served as Majority Leader in the U.S. Senate. When Johnson announced his candidacy for President of the United States, Hand became the campaign's state coordinator in California, but Johnson eventually became John F. Kennedy's running mate. After Kennedy won the election and Johnson became Vice President, Hand went on to become a lawyer and vice president of the Pierce National Life Insurance Company in Los Angeles.

In December 1964, when Angier Biddle Duke announced his resignation as Chief of Protocol of the United States to serve as the U.S. Ambassador to Spain, then-President Johnson chose Hand to replace Duke, calling Hand a "trusted and respected friend and associate." Hand took office as Chief of Protocol on January 21, 1965. He left the position after 14 months. In 1972, Hand joined the presidential campaign of former Vice President Hubert Humphrey as senior traveling advisor. Humphrey lost the Democratic nomination to Sen. George McGovern.

As of 2019, Hand works as senior counsel at the law firm King & Spalding in Washington, D.C., where he provides counsel to Fortune 500 companies, foreign governments and institutional clients. He was also a member of the Council of American Ambassadors and served as co-chair of the council's Ambassadors Roundtable program in 2013.

== Personal life ==
Hand is married to the jewelry designer Ann Hand. They have five children.
