= Know Your Power =

2008 memoir by Nancy Pelosi

Know Your Power: A Message to America's Daughters
- Author: Nancy Pelosi, Amy Hill Hearth
- Language: English
- Genre: Memoir
- Publisher: Doubleday
- Publication date: July 29, 2008
- Publication place: United States

Know Your Power: A Message to America's Daughters is a 2008 memoir by House Speaker Nancy Pelosi, published by Doubleday on July 29, 2008. It is co-written with New York Times best-selling author and Peabody Award-winning writer Amy Hill Hearth. It is Pelosi's first published book.

== Background ==
The book is a personal and political history describing her own youth as the daughter of U.S. Congressman Thomas D'Alesandro, Jr., being a stay-at-home mom, becoming a Democratic organizer in California, running for Congress at 47 and eventually becoming the highest ranking woman in the history of the United States government at the time. Pelosi also writes about the experiences of other women to serve in Congress and opposition to the presidency and policies of George W. Bush. The book seeks to impart wisdom and re-inforce self-esteem in women of all ages.

The title comes from advice given to her by former Rep. Lindy Boggs.

== Publishing history ==
Doubleday acquired rights to publish Pelosi's memoirs in July 2007, led by Doubleday president Stephen Rubin. Pelosi was represented by the William Morris Agency, including chairman Norman Brokaw, who said, "When I first met Nancy Pelosi twenty years ago, I could tell she was destined to make history. I told her to start taking notes." Publishers Weekly described the book as "a gentle account from a tough politician."

== Publicity tour ==
Pelosi's promotional tour for the book in July 2008 included appearances on Today, The View and The Colbert Report.
