= Robbie =

Robbie and Robby, also Robbi and Roby, are given names. They are usually encountered as a nickname or a shortened form of Robert, Rob or Robin. The name experienced a significant rise in popularity in Northern Ireland in 2003. Robbie is also a surname. Similar names include Robie and Robey.

== People ==
=== Given name ===
Robbi

- Robbi Chong (born 1965), Canadian actress and former model
- Robbi Finkel (born 1950), American composer
- Robbi Kempson (born 1974), South African rugby union player
- Robbi Mecus (1971–2024), American forest ranger and mountain climber
- Robbi Ryan (born 1997), American basketball player
- Robbi Weldon (born 1975), Canadian Paralympic athlete

Robbie

- Robbie Abel (born 1989), Australian rugby union player
- Robbie Agnone (born 1985), American football player
- Robbie Ale (born 1973), Samoan rugby union player
- Robbie Allen, several people, including
  - Robbie Allen (baseball) (born 1959), American baseball coach
  - Robbie Allen (musician), American bassist and guitarist
- Robbie Amell (born 1988), Canadian actor and producer
- Robbie Anderson (footballer) (1936–1996), English footballer
- Robbie Aristodemo (born 1977), Canadian soccer player
- Robbie Arnott (born 1989), Australian author
- Robbie Avila (born 2003), American basketball player
- Robbie Azodo (born 2001), Finnish footballer
- Robbie Bachman (1953–2023), Canadian drummer
- Robbie Barnard (1941–2013), South African rugby union player
- Robbie Barrett (born 1992), British boxer
- Robbie Basho (1940-1986), American musician
- Robbie Beazley (born 1974), Australian rugby league player
- Robbie Beckett (born 1972), American baseball player
- Robbie Beckett (rugby league) (born 1972), Australian rugby league footballer
- Robbie Benoit (died 2007), Canadian poet and writer
- Robbie Benson (born 1992), Irish footballer
- Robbie Bina (born 1983), American ice hockey player
- Robbie Blackadder (born 1955), Australian speedway rider
- Robbie Blair (born 1953), South African rugby union footballer
- Robbie Blake (born 1976), English footballer
- Robbie Blunt (born 1951), English rock guitarist
- Robbie Bonham (1971–2025), Irish comedian
- Robbie Booth (born 1985), English footballer
- Robbie Bordley (born c. 1947), American rugby union player
- Robbie Bosco (born 1963), American football player
- Robbie Bourdon, Canadian mountain biker
- Robbie Boyd, British singer, songwriter and musician
- Robbie Boyle, Dublin Gaelic footballer
- Robbie Brace (born 1964), English footballer
- Robbie Brackett (born 1963), American politician from Florida
- Robbie Brady (born 1992), Irish footballer
- Robbie Branscum (1937–1997), American novelist
- Robbie Brennan (1947–2016), Irish musician
- Robbie Brenner, American media executive, head of Mattel Studios
- Robbie Brightwell (1939–2022), British athlete
- Robbie Brookside (born 1966), English retired professional wrestler
- Robbie Brown (born 1990), Northern Irish ice hockey player
- Robbie Brunton (1973–2020), Irish footballer
- Robbie Bryant (born 1979), New Zealand boxer
- Robbie Buchanan (born 1996), Scottish footballer
- Robbie Buck (born 1973), Australian radio announcer
- Robbie Buhl (born 1963), American racing driver
- Robbie Burns (footballer) (born 1990), English footballer
- Robbie Burton (footballer) (born 1999), Welsh footballer
- Robbie Busscher (born 1982), Dutch footballer
- Robbie Butler (born 1972), Unionist politician
- Robbie Buttigieg (1936–2004), Maltese footballer
- Robbie Cadee (born 1950), Australian former NBL player and coach
- Robbie Caldwell (born 1954), American football coach
- Robbie Campbell (born 1942/1943), Canadian football player
- Robbie Capito (born 2001), Hong Kong professional pool player
- Robbie Carrico, American contestant on American Idol (season 7)
- Robbie Carroll (born 1968), English professional footballer
- Robbie Castleman (1929–2009), American politician
- Robbie Chosen (born 1993), American football player
- Robbie Clark (born 1991), English footballer
- Robbie Cleary (born 2003), Canadian soccer player
- Robbie Coburn (born 1994), Australian poet
- Robbie Coetzee (born 1989), South African MLR player
- Robbie Coleman (born 1990), Australian MLR player
- Robbie Collin, British film critic
- Robbie Coltrane (1950–2022), Scottish actor
- Robbie Conal (born 1944), American guerrilla poster artist
- Robbie Cooke (1957–2021), English footballer and manager
- Robbie Cooper (born 1969), British artist, photographer, and video game programmer
- Robbie Costigan (born 1982), Irish Gaelic footballer
- Robbie Cotter (born 2001), Irish hurler
- Robbie Countryman, American television director
- Robbie Crane (born 1969), American musician
- Robbie Crawford, several people, including
  - Robbie Crawford (footballer, born 1993) (born 1993), Scottish footballer
  - Robbie Crawford (footballer, born 1994) (born 1994), Scottish footballer
- Robbie Cundy (born 1997), English professional footballer
- Robbie Dale (1940–2021), British radio disc jockey
- Robbie Davies (1949–2017), British professional boxer
- Robbie Davies Jr. (born 1989), British professional boxer
- Robbie Davis (born 1961), American jockey
- Robbie Davis-Floyd (born 1951), American cultural-, medical-, and reproductive anthropologist, researcher, author, and international speaker
- Robbie Daymond (born 1982), American actor and voice actor
- Robbie Deans (born 1959), New Zealand rugby union coach and former player
- Robbie Deas (born 2000), Scottish professional footballer
- Robbie Dennison (born 1963), Northern Irish professional footballer
- Robbie Devereux (born 1971), English professional footballer
- Robbie D'Haese (born 1999), Belgian footballer
- Robbie Diack (born 1985), South African-born Irish rugby union player
- Robbie Dickson, British-Canadian engineer and entrepreneur
- Robbie Diver (born 1974), New Zealand cricketer
- Robbie Dixon (born 1985), Canadian alpine skier
- Robbie Doherty (born 1988), Canadian curler
- Robbie Dolan, Irish jockey
- Robbie Douglas-Miller, Baron Douglas-Miller (born 1965), British politician
- Robbie Doyle (born 1982), Irish soccer player
- Robbie Duff Scott (1959–2016), British oil painter
- Robbie Duffy (born 1980), Australian NRL player
- Robert Dunn, several people, including
  - Robbie Dunn (born 1960), Australian former soccer player
  - Robbie Dunn (musician) (born 1951), Irish folk singer-songwriter
- Robbie Dunne (born 1969), Irish soccer player
- Robbie Dupree (born 1946), American singer
- Robbie Dykes, Australian rules football player and coach
- Robbie Dynamite (born 1982), British professional wrestler
- Robbie E (born 1983), American professional wrestler and manager
- Robbie Eagles (born 1990), Australian professional wrestler
- Robbie Earl (born 1985), American NL player
- Robbie Earle (born 1965), Jamaican-born English former footballer and broadcaster
- Robbie Elliott (born 1973), English football coach and former professional player
- Robbie Ellis (born 1943), American professional wrestler
- Robbie Erlin (born 1990), American MLB pitcher
- Robbie Ethridge (born 1955), American anthropologist and author
- Robbie Faggart (born 1960), American stock car racing driver
- Robbie Fairchild (born 1987), American dancer and actor
- Robbie Farah (born 1984), Australian rugby league player
- Robbie Fergusson (born 1993), Scottish rugby union player
- Robbie Findley (born 1985), American USL player
- Robbie Fitzgibbon (1996–2024), English middle-distance runner
- Robbie Fleck (born 1975), South African rugby union footballer
- Robbie Fletcher, Kentucky educator
- Robbie Fowler (born 1975), English footballer and manager
- Robbie Fox (born 1993), Australian AFL player
- Robbie Foy (born 1985), Scottish footballer
- Robbie Fradd (born 1964), South African jockey
- Robbie France (1959–2012), English drummer, record producer, arranger, journalist, music educator, and broadcaster
- Robbie Francevic (born 1941), New Zealand racing driver
- Robbie Fraser, Scottish film maker
- Robbie Fraser (footballer) (born 2003), Scottish footballer
- Robbie Frew (born 1970), New Zealand cricketer
- Robbie Fruean (born 1988), New Zealand rugby union footballer
- Robbie Ftorek (born 1952), American NHL coach and former player
- Robbie Fulks (born 1963), American alternative country singer-songwriter and instrumentalist
- Robbie G.K. (born 1996), Canadian actor
- Robbie Gaffney (born 1957), Irish footballer
- Robbie Gall (1906–1971), Australian VFL player
- Robbie Gallagher (born 1968), Irish politician
- Robbie Gee (born 1970), British actor
- Robbie Gibb (born 1964), British public relations professional and former political advisor and broadcast journalist
- Robbie Gibbons (born 1991), Irish professional footballer
- Robbie Gladwell (born 1950), English rock and blues guitarist
- Robbie Glendinning (born 1995), Australian MLB player
- Robbie Glover, several people, including
  - Robbie Glover (singer), English singer-songwriter
- Robbie Goldstein, American infectious diseases physician, and candidate in the 2020 House of Representatives elections in Massachusetts
- Robbie Gotts (born 1999), English professional footballer
- Robbie Gould (born 1982), American NFL player
- Robbie Grabarz (born 1987), British high jumper
- Robbie Grace (born 1954), South African professional snooker player
- Robbie Gray (born 1988), Australian AFL player
- Robbie Green (born 1974), English professional darts player
- Robbie Greenberg (born 1947), American film- and television cinematographer
- Robbie Greville (born 1994), Irish hurler
- Robbie Gries, American petroleum geologist
- Robbie Gringras, British-born Israeli writer, performer, and educator
- Robbie Groff (born 1966), American racing driver
- Robbie Grossman (born 1989), American MLB player
- Robbie Guertin, American keyboardist/guitarist/backup vocalist
- Robbie Haddrill (born 1981), Australian AFL player
- Robbie Haemhouts (born 1983), Belgian professional footballer
- Robbie Haines (born 1954), American sailor and Olympic champion
- Robbie Hanley (born 1996), Irish hurler
- Robbie Harris (born 1982), South African rugby union player
- Robbie Harrison (born 1948), Canadian politician and educator
- Robert Hart, several people, including
  - Robbie Hart (born 1947), English football referee
  - Robbie Hart (cricketer) (born 1974), New Zealand cricketer
  - Robbie E. Hart, American biologist
- Robbie Haw (born 1986), English footballer
- Robbie Hedderman (born 1982), Irish footballer
- Robbie Hedges, Native American politician
- Robbie Hemfrey (born 2002), Scottish professional footballer
- Robbie Henderson (born 1982), Scottish footballer
- Robbie Henshaw (born 1993), Irish URC player
- Robbie Herndon (born 1993), Filipino-American PBA player
- Robbie Herrera (born 1970), English professional footballer
- Robbie Hill (born 1954), New Zealand cricketer
- Robbie Hood, American atmospheric scientist and NASA person
- Robbie Hooker (born 1967), Australian soccer player and coach
- Robbie Horgan (born 1968), Irish professional footballer
- Robbie Horn (born 1977), Scottish professional footballer
- Robbie Hourmont (born 1969), British alpine skier
- Robbie Howard (born 1955), American entertainer, singer, impersonator, and comedian
- Robbie Hucker (born 1990), Australian professional racing cyclist
- Robbie Hummel (born 1989), American NBA player
- Robbie Hunter, several people, including
  - Robbie Hunter (cyclist) (born 1977), South African cyclist
  - Robbie Hunter-Paul (born 1976), NZ international rugby league footballer and sports broadcaster/pundit
- Robbie Irons (born 1946), Canadian NHL- and IHL goaltender
- Robbie Ivison (born 2000), English professional footballer
- Robert J. Sherman (born 1968), American songwriter and businessman
- Robbie James (1957–1998), Welsh international footballer
- Robbie Jansen (1949–2010), South African musician
- Robbie Jarvis (born 1986), British actor
- Robbie Johnson (born 1962), English professional footballer
- Robbie Johnston (born 1967), New Zealand long-distance runner
- Robbie Jones, several people, including
  - Robbie Jones (actor) (born 1977), American actor
  - Robbie Jones (American football) (born 1959), American football player
- Robbie Joseph (born 1982), Antiguan-born English professional cricketer
- Robbie Katter (born 1977), Australian politician
- Robbie Kay, British actor
- Robbie Keane (born 1980), Irish footballer
- Robbie Kearns (born 1971), Australian professional rugby league footballer
- Robbie Kelleher, Irish former Gaelic footballer
- Robbie Kelleher (soccer) (born 1984), Irish footballer
- Robbie Kennealy (born 2006), American racing driver
- Robbie Kerr, several people, including
  - Robbie Kerr (Australian cricketer) (born 1961), Australian cricketer
  - Robbie Kerr (New Zealand cricketer) (born 1966), New Zealand cricketer
  - Robbie Kerr (racing driver) (born 1979), British racing driver
- Robbie Kessler (born 1973), German motorcycle speedway rider
- Robbie Kiely (born 1990), Irish Gaelic footballer
- Robbie King, several people, including
  - Robbie King (darts player) (born 1993), Australian darts player
  - Robbie King (footballer) (born 1986), English footballer
  - Robbie King (musician) (1947–2003), Canadian musician
- Robbie Klay (born 1986), South African singer, songwriter, and television- and theater actor
- Robbie Kmetoni, Australian contestant on So You Think You Can Dance Australia (season 3)
- Robbie Knievel (1962–2023), American motorcyclist and stunt performer
- Robbie Koenig (born 1971), South African retired professional tennis player and current tennis commentator and analyst
- Robbie Kondor, American composer, session musician, and arranger
- Robbie Kruse (born 1988), Australian association football player
- Robbie Kydd (born 1982), New Zealand rugby union footballer
- Robbie Laing (born 1958), American college basketball coach
- Robbie Lakeman (born 1986), American competitive video game player
- Robbie Lane, lead singer of Canadian rock band Robbie Lane and the Disciples
- Robbie Lawler (born 1982), American professional mixed martial artist
- Robbie Lawlor (1985–2020), Irish criminal
- Robbie Lawlor (Irish criminal) (?–2020), Irish criminal
- Robbie Leppzer, American documentary filmmaker
- Robbie Lawson (born 1974), New Zealand cricketer
- Robbie Lee (actress) (born 1954), American actress
- Robbie Lee (diver) (born 2005), British diver
- Robbie Lee (musician), American composer and multi-instrumentalist
- Robbie Leslie, American DJ
- Robbie Loomis (born 1964), American NASCAR crew chief
- Robbie Louw (born 1992), South African rugby union player
- Robbie Lunt (born 1973), English professional footballer
- Robbie Lyn (born 1951), Jamaican session musician
- Robbie Lyons (1972–2003), American murderer who was executed
- Robbie MacDonald (1870–1946), Australian cricketer
- Robbie MacNeill (born 1946/1947), Canadian guitarist and singer-songwriter
- Robbie Maddison (born 1981), Australian motorcycle stunt rider
- Robbie Magasiva (born 1972), Samoan-New Zealand actor
- Robbie Malneek (born 1983), New Zealand rugby union player
- Robbie Malolo (born 2001), Finnish footballer
- Robbie Mannheim (born 1935), American who received Roman Catholic exorcisms
- Robbie Manson (born 1989), New Zealand rower
- Robbie Martin (born 1958), American NFL player
- Robbie McCallion (1979–2009), Irish Gaelic footballer
- Robbie McCallum (born 1967), Scottish screenwriter and novelist
- Robbie McCallum (rugby union) (born 2000), Scottish rugby union player
- Robbie McCauley (1942–2021), American playwright, director, performer, and professor
- Robbie McClellan (born 1981), American college baseball coach and former pitcher
- Robbie McComb (born 1995), Australian rules footballer
- Robbie McCormack (born 1964), Australian professional rugby league footballer
- Robbie McDaid (born 1993), Irish Gaelic footballer
- Robbie McDaid (association footballer) (born 1996), Northern Irish footballer
- Robbie McEwen (born 1972), Australian professional road cyclist
- Robbie McGhie (born 1951), Australian VFL player
- Robbie McGrath (born 1951), Irish international rugby union player
- Robbie McGuigan (born 2004), Northern Irish professional snooker player
- Robbie McIntosh (born 1957), English guitarist
- Robbie McIntosh (drummer) (1950–1974), Scottish drummer
- Robbie McKenzie (born 1998), English professional footballer
- Robbie McLean (born 1960), New Zealand rugby union player
- Robbie Mears (born 1974), Australian professional rugby league footballer
- Robbie Merrill (born 1963), American bassist
- Robbie Mertz (born 1996), American USL player
- Robbie Middleby (born 1975), Australian NSL player
- Robbie Middleton (1990–2011), American murder victim
- Robbie Millar (1967–2005), Northern Irish head chef and restaurateur
- Robbie Miller, Australian singer
- Robbie Miller (cricketer) (born 1979), New Zealand cricketer
- Robbie Montgomery (born 1940), American singer and restaurateur
- Robbie Montgomery (cricketer) (born 1994), English cricketer
- Robert Moore, several people, including
  - Robbie Moore (ice hockey) (1954–2022), Canadian ice hockey player
  - Robbie Moore (politician) (born 1984), British Conservative politician
- Robbie Morris (born 1982), English rugby union player
- Robbie Morris (politician), American politician
- Robbie Morrison, Scottish comic book writer
- Robbie Muir (footballer) (born 1953), Indigenous Australian VFL player
- Robbie Muirhead (born 1996), Scottish professional footballer
- Robbie Mulhern (born 1994), English professional rugby league footballer
- Robbie Murray (born 1976), Irish professional boxer
- Robbie Mustoe (born 1968), English retired footballer and current sports commentator
- Robbie Mutch (born 1998), Scottish footballer
- Robbie Muzzell (born 1945), South African cricketer
- Robbie Nairn (born 1997), Scottish international rugby union player
- Robbie Naismith (born 1964), New Zealand sailor
- Robbie Nallenweg (born 1991), American football player
- Robbie Neale (born 1953), Canadian WHA player
- Robbie Neilson (born 1980), Scottish professional football manager and former player
- Robbie Nevil (born 1958), American singer
- Robbie Newman (born 1981), English cricketer
- Robbie Newton (born 1952), New Zealand cricketer
- Robert Nichols, several people, including
  - Robbie Nichols (1946–2011), American football player
  - Robbie Nichols (ice hockey) (born 1964), Canadian ice hockey player and coach
- Robbie Nishida (born 1977), Japanese professional drifter
- Robbie O'Connell (born 1951), Irish singer-songwriter
- Robbie O'Davis (born 1972), Australian professional rugby league footballer
- Robbie O'Flynn (born 1997), Irish hurler
- Robbie O'Malley (born 1965), Irish Gaelic footballer
- Robbie Ouzts (born 2002), American football player
- Robbie Painter (born 1971), English professional footballer
- Robbie Parker (born 1948), Australian rugby league footballer
- Robbie Parris, Canadian Basketball Player and Coach
- Robbie Patton, English singer-songwriter
- Robbie Pecorari (born 1987), American racing driver
- Robbie Peden (born 1973), Australian professional boxer
- Robbie Peers (born 1956), Australian VFL player
- Robbie Peralta (born 1986), American mixed martial artist
- Robbie Perkins (born 1994), Australian professional baseball player
- Robbie Peters (born 1971), English professional footballer
- Robbie Pethick (born 1970), English footballer
- Robbie Petzer (born 1996), South African MLR player
- Robbie Pickering, American film and television writer, director, and producer
- Robbie the Pict (born 1948), Scottish campaigner and former candidate
- Robbie Pierce (1959–2023), American off-road racer and business owner
- Robbie Povey (born 1996), English-born Canadian rugby union player
- Robbie Power, Irish jockey
- Robbie Rae (1954–2006), British-Canadian member of singing duo The Raes
- Robbie Raeside (born 1972), South African-born Scottish footballer
- Robbie Rage (born 1970), American professional wrestler
- Robert Ray, several people, including
  - Robbie Ray (born 1991), American baseball player
  - Robbie Ray (racing driver) (born 1982), American racing driver
- Robbie Regan (born 1968), Welsh professional boxer
- Robbie Reinelt (born 1974), English footballer
- Robbie Reiser (born 1963), American crew chief, general manager, and driver for NASCAR
- Robbie Rist (born 1964), American actor and musician
- Robbie Rivera (born 1973), Puerto Rican house music producer and DJ
- Robbie Robertson, several people, including
  - Robbie Robertson (1943–2023), Canadian singer, songwriter and guitarist
  - Robbie Robertson (visual effects artist) (1931–2019), American screenwriter and visual effects artist
- Robbie Robinson, several people, including
  - Robbie Robinson (basketball) (born 1959), American basketball referee
  - Robbie Robinson (footballer) (1879–1951), English footballer
  - Robbie Robinson (rugby union) (born 1989), New Zealand rugby union player
  - Robbie Robinson (soccer) (born 1998), American soccer player
- Robbie Robson (1918–1996), New Zealand lawn bowls player
- Robbie Robson (communist) (1897–1973), British communist activist
- Robbie Rochow (born 1990), Australian NRL player
- Robbie Rogers (born 1987), American footballer, first openly gay athlete in North America
- Robbie Rosen, American contestant on American Idol (season 10)
- Robert Ross, several people, including
  - Robbie Ross (1869–1918), British journalist and art critic; lover of Oscar Wilde
  - Robbie Ross (rugby league) (born 1975), Australia international rugby league footballer
  - Robbie Ross Jr. (born 1989), American baseball player
- Robbie Rouse (born 1991), American IFL player
- Robbie Rowlands (born 1968), Australian visual artist
- Robbie Russell, several people, including
  - Robbie Russell (footballer) (born 1979), Ghanaian former footballer
  - Robbie Russell (rugby union) (born 1976), Scotland international rugby union player
- Robbie Russo (born 1993), American NHL player
- Robbie Ryan, several people, including
  - Robbie Ryan (cinematographer) (born 1970), Irish cinematographer
  - Robbie Ryan (footballer) (born 1977), Irish footballer
- Robert Savage, several people, including
  - Robbie Savage (born 1974), Welsh football manager, pundit, and former player
  - Robbie Savage (footballer, born 1960) (born 1960), English footballer
  - Robbie Savage (football fan) (1967–2017), Namibian football fan
  - Robbie Shepherdson (born 1995), Scottish field hockey player
- Robbie Schaw (born 1984), New Zealand cricketer
- Robbie Seay, American lead singer of Christian contemporary band Robbie Seay Band
- Robbie Servais (born 1976), Dutch former footballer and current assistant manager
- Robbie Shakespeare (1953–2021), Jamaican bass guitarist and record producer
- Robbie Shaw (born 1983), English international rugby union player
- Robbie Shepherd (1936–2023), Scottish broadcaster and author
- Robbie Sigurðsson (born 1993), American-born Icelandic IHL player
- Robbie Sihota (born 1987), Canadian-Indian basketball player
- Robbie Simpson, several people, including
  - Robbie Simpson (born 1985), English footballer
  - Robbie Simpson (rugby league) (born 1975), Australian rugby league footballer
  - Robbie Simpson (runner) (born 1991), British long-distance runner
- Robbie Sims (born 1959), American professional boxer
- Robbie Slater (born 1964), Australian former NSL player and sports commentator
- Robert Smith, several people, including
  - Robbie Smith (Canadian football) (born 1997), Canadian gridiron football player
  - Robbie Smith (field hockey), British field hockey player
  - Robbie Smith (rugby union) (born 1998), Scottish rugby union player
- Robbie Squire (born 1990), American cyclist
- Robbie Stamp (born 1960), British computer specialist
- Robbie Stanley (1967–1994), American auto racing driver
- Robbie Steinhouse (born 1961), British author and entrepreneur
- Robbie Stewart (born 1991), British motorcycle racer
- Robbie Stirling (born 1960), Canadian racing driver
- Robbie Stockdale (born 1979), English football manager and former professional player
- Robbie Storey (born 1999), English professional rugby league footballer
- Robbie Stuart (born 1948), New Zealand rugby union player
- Robbie Talbot (born 1979), English professional footballer and coach
- Robbie Tarrant (born 1989), Australian AFL player
- Robbie Taylor (born 1981), Canadian swimmer
- Robbie Temple (born 1986), English professional squash player
- Robbie Tew (born 1961), Australian professional rugby league footballer
- Robert Thompson, several people, including
  - Robbie Thompson (born 1967), Australian rules footballer
  - Robbie Thompson (Scottish footballer) (born 2004), Scottish footballer
- Robert Thomson, several people, including
  - Robbie Thomson (born 1993), Scottish footballer
- Robbie Thorpe, Aboriginal Australian activist
- Robbie Threlfall (born 1988), English footballer
- Robbie Tice (born 1990), Canadian soccer player
- Robbie Timmons, American TV news anchor/reporter
- Robbie Tobeck (born 1970), American NFL player
- Robbie Tolan (born 1985), American shooting victim
- Robbie Tripp, American rapper and internet personality
- Robbie Tronco, American music producer, DJ, and songwriter
- Robbie Tucker (born 2001), American actor
- Robbie Turner (drag queen) (born 1985), American drag queen and writer
- Robbie Ure (born 2004), Scottish professional footballer
- Robbie van Graan (1939–2014), South African cricketer
- Robbie van Leeuwen (born 1944), Dutch musician, guitarist, and songwriter
- Robbie Venter (born 1960), South African businessman and former professional tennis player
- Robbie Ventura (born 1971), American professional racing cyclist
- Robbie Vincent (born 1946), English radio broadcaster and DJ
- Robbie Waisman (born 1931), Polish-Canadian educator and Holocaust survivor
- Robbie Wakenshaw (born 1965), English professional footballer
- Robbie Ward (born 1995), English rugby league footballer
- Robbie Waterhouse, Australian racing identity, businessman, form specialist, punter, and bookmaker
- Robbie Watts, past member of Australian punk rock band Cosmic Psychos
- Robbie Weingard (born 1963), American college basketball player
- Robbie Weinhardt (born 1985), American MLB pitcher
- Robbie Weir (born 1988), Northern Irish EFL player
- Robbie Weiss (born 1966), American tour professional tennis player
- Robbie Wessels, South African Afrikaans singer and actor
- Robbie West (born 1969), Australian AFL player
- Robbie White (born 1995), English cricketer
- Robbie Widlansky (born 1984), American MLB player
- Robbie Wijting (1925–1986), Dutch military officer
- Robbie Williams, several people, including
  - Robbie Williams (born 1974), English singer
  - Robbie Williams (cricketer) (born 1987), English cricketer
  - Robbie Williams (footballer, born 1984), English footballer
  - Robbie Williams (footballer, born 1979), English footballer
  - Robbie Williams (politician) (1965–2007), Australian politician
  - Robbie Williams (snooker player) (born 1986), English snooker player
- Robbie Williamson (born 1969), Scottish former footballer and former manager
- Robbie Willmott (born 1990), English EFL player
- Robert Wills (born 1968), American attorney and former politician
- Robbie Wine (born 1962), American MLB player
- Robbie Winters (born 1974), Scottish footballer
- Robbie Young (Australian footballer) (born 1995), Australian rules footballer
- Robbie X (born 1995), English professional wrestler
- Robbie Zipp (born 1963), American soccer player and current youth soccer referee

Robby

- Robby Ahlstrom (born 1999), American baseball player
- Robby Albarado (born 1973), American horse racing jockey
- Robby Ameen (born 1960), American drummer, composer, bandleader, and educator
- Robby Andrews (born 1991), American middle-distance runner
- Robby Ashford (born 2002), American college football player
- Robby Barnett, American dancer
- Robby Benson (born 1956), stage name of American actor and director Robin David Segal
- Robby Benton (born 1979), American professional stock car racing driver
- Robby Blackwell (born 1986), American singer-songwriter, producer, and instrumentalist
- Robby Bostain (born 1984), American-Israeli DBL player
- Robby Brink (born 1971), South African rugby union player
- Robby Brown (born 1980), American NFL coach
- Robby Cantarutti (born 1966), Italian architect and industrial designer
- Robby Carter (born 1960), American politician
- Robby Celiz (born 1988), Filipino MPBL player, and former ABL- and PSL player
- Robby D. (1967–2021), American pornographic film director and cinematographer
- Robby Dambrot (born 1994), American USL player
- Robby Darwis (born 1964), Indonesian footballer and coach
- Robby De Caluwé (born 1975), Belgian politician
- Robby De Sá (born 1979), South African producer, songwriter, and multi-instrumentalist
- Robby Enthoven (born 1968), South African/Dutch businessman
- Robby Fabbri (born 1996), Canadian NHL player
- Robby Felix (born 1986), American NFL player
- Robby Foldvari (born 1960), Australian player of snooker, English billiards, and pool
- Robby Foley (born 1996), American racing driver
- Robby Fulton (born 1982), American USL player
- Robby Garner (born 1963), American natural language programmer and software developer
- Robby Gerhardt (born 1987), German rower
- Robby Ginepri (born 1982), American professional tennis player
- Robby Gonzales, American boxer
- Robby Gordon (born 1969), American auto racing driver
- Robby Greenfield, American businessman, activist, philanthropist, and former college athlete
- Robby Hammock (born 1977), American former MLB catcher and current manager
- Robby Henson (born 1946), American director and screenwriter
- Robby Hoffman, American-Canadian writer, comedian, and talk show host
- Robby Kelley (born 1990), American alpine ski racer
- Robby Krieger (born 1946), American guitar player of The Doors
- Robby Langers (born 1960), Luxembourgish professional footballer
- Robby Lyons (born 1989), American professional stock car racing driver
- Robby Maria, past member of Berlin rock band Robby Maria & The Silent Revolution
- Robby Martin (born 1999), American MLB player
- Robby Maruanaya (?–2020), Indonesian footballer and manager
- Robby McCrorie (born 1998), Scottish professional footballer
- Robby McGehee (born 1973), American former race car driver
- Robby Mills (born 1967), American politician
- Robby Mook (born 1979), American political strategist
- Robby Müller (1940–2018), Dutch cinematographer most often associated with film director Wim Wenders
- Robby Naish (born 1963), American athlete and entrepreneur
- Robby Navarro (born 1979), Filipino singer
- Robby Ndefe (born 1996), Dutch-Angolan professional footballer
- Robby Novak (born 2003), American actor and media personality
- Robby Roarsen (born 1974), Norwegian sprint canoer
- Robby Sagel (born 1995), American USL player
- Robby Schlund (born 1967), German politician
- Robby Scott (born 1989), American MLB pitcher
- Robby Shelton (born 1995), American professional golfer
- Robby Simon (born 1978), German slalom canoeist
- Robby Snelling (born 2003), American MLB pitcher
- Robby Soave (born 1988/1989), American journalist and editor
- Robby Starbuck Newsom, American film director, and candidate for the 2022 US House of Representatives election
- Robby Stein, American businessman
- Robby Steinhardt (1950–2021), American rock violinist and singer who worked with the group Kansas
- Robby Stevenson (born 1976), American college football player
- Robby Swift (born 1984), English professional windsurfer
- Robby Takac (born 1964), American rock bassist and vocalist
- Robby Unser (born 1968), American Indy Racing League driver
- Robby Wells (born 1968), American politician, perennial candidate, and former college football coach

Roby

- Roby Andika (born 1999), Indonesian footballer
- Roby Brock, American media executive, journalist, and political reporter
- Roby Bujdoso (born 1993), American racing driver
- George Roby Dempster (1887–1964), American businessman and politician
- Roby Duke (1956–2007), American musician
- Roby Facchinetti (born 1944), Italian musician
- Roby Fletcher (1833–1894), Australian Congregational minister
- Roby Hentges (born 1940), Luxembourgish cyclist
- Roby Järventie (born 2002), Finnish ice hockey player
- Roby Lakatos (born 1965), Hungarian jazz violinist
- Roby Manuel (1895–1975), Australian fighter pilot
- Roby Monroe, American soccer player
- Roby Muhamad (born 1975), Indonesian entrepreneur and scientist
- Roby La Mura (born 1968), Italian rower
- Roby Norales (born 1991), Honduran footballer
- Roby Varghese Raj, Indian cinematographer
- Roby Rausch, Luxembourgish boxer
- Roby Schaeffer (1930–2014), Luxembourgish sprinter
- Roby Smith (born 1977), American businessman and politician
- Roby C. Thompson (1898–1960), American district judge
- Roby Yonge (1943–1997), American radio DJ
- Roby Young (born 1942), Israeli footballer
- Roby Zucchi (born 1951), Italian water skier

=== Surname ===
Robbi

- Adolf Robbi (1868–1920), Swiss painter
- Andrea Robbi (1864–1945), Swiss artist

Robbie

- Christopher Robbie (born 1938), British actor and theatre director
- David Robbie (Australian footballer) (born 1944), Australian rules footballer
- David Robbie (Fijian politician) (1849–1940), businessman and politician in colonial Fiji
- David Robbie (Scottish footballer) (1899–1978)
- James Andrew Robbie (1910–1977), Scottish geologist
- Joe Robbie (1916–1990), American attorney and politician
- John Robbie (born 1955), Irish rugby union player
- Margot Robbie (born 1990), Australian actress and producer
- Mike Robbie (born 1943), American football general manager
- Rod Robbie (1928–2012), Canadian architect and planner
- Seymour Robbie (1919–2004), American television director
- William Robbie (1849–1929), American politician in California

Roby

- Alain Roby, American pastry chef
- Bradley Roby (born 1992), American football player
- Courtney Roby (born 1983), American football player
- Daniel Roby (born 1970), Canadian film director and cinematographer
- Don Roby (1933–2013), English footballer
- Doug Roby (1898–1992), American athlete and official
- Erica Roby (born 1983), American actress
- Gabriel Roby (1878–1917), French painter
- Henry Albert Roby (1844–1905), American architect
- Henry John Roby (1830–1915), British classicist and politician
- Ida Hall Roby (1857–1899), Early American woman pharmacist
- Isaiah Roby (born 1998), American basketball player
- James Roby (born 1985), English Rugby League legend
- John Roby (1793–1850), English banker, poet & writer
- John Roby (composer), Canadian composer
- Joseph Roby (1724–1803), American Congregationalist minister
- Kenny Roby, North Carolina-based singer-songwriter
- Kimberla Lawson Roby (born 1965), American novelist
- Lelia P. Roby (1848–1910), American philanthropist
- Lloyd Roby (born 1999), English rugby league player
- Martha Roby (born 1976), American politician
- Matt Roby (born 1984), American politician
- Mike Roby (born 1986), English rugby league footballer
- Muhammad Roby (born 1985), Indonesian footballer
- Peta Roby, Australian dancer and choreographer
- Peter Roby (born 1957), American basketball coach
- Reggie Roby (1961–2005), American football player
- Richard Roby (born 1985), American basketball player
- Vic Roby (1917–2011), American actor
- William Roby (1766–1830), English clergyman

== Fictional characters ==
- Robbie Baldwin, superhero in Marvel Comics
- Robbie Barone, in the TV series Everybody Loves Raymond
- Robbie the Reindeer, in three animated comedy TV specials
- Robbie Douglas, in the TV series My Three Sons
- Robbie Flynn, in the soap opera Hollyoaks
- Robbie Fraser, in the soap opera River City
- Robbie Hunter, in the soap opera Home and Away
- Robbie Jackson, in the BBC soap opera EastEnders
- Robbie Lawson, in the British soap opera Emmerdale
- Robbie Mercer, in the film series Scream
- Robbie Moffat, in the British soap opera Brookside
- Robbie Palmer, in the TV series 7th Heaven
- Robbie Quinn, in the TV series Fair City
- Robbie Reyes, superhero in Marvel Comics
- Robbie Robertson (character), in the Spider-Man comic books
- Robbie Roscoe, in the soap opera Hollyoaks
- Robbie Rotten, in the Icelandic children's TV show LazyTown
- Robbie Shapiro, in the TV series Victorious
- Robbie Sinclair, in the TV series Dinosaurs
- Robbie Sloan, in the soap opera Coronation Street
- Robbie Wright, from Grange Hill
- Robby Keene, in the Cobra Kai series
- Robby the Robot, in films and TV programs
- Robby Stewart, in the TV series Hannah Montana
- Roby (Ninjago), character from Ninjago
