= Donkey Kong high score competition =

Esports competition

Players have competed for the highest score for the video game Donkey Kong since its release in 1981. The competition became more prominent after it was covered in the 2007 documentary The King of Kong.

== History ==
On November 7, 1982, Billy Mitchell set the first widely recognized Donkey Kong world record of 874,300 points. The record stood until August 17, 2000, when it was surpassed by Tim Sczerby's score of 879,200. The competition became more prominent after it was covered in the 2007 documentary The King of Kong, which follows the rivalry between Mitchell and Steve Wiebe.

Wiebe began to compete with Hank Chien, a plastic surgeon from New York. In March 2010, Chien surpassed Wiebe's record score. Wiebe achieved a new record score on August 30, but Chien, who became known as Dr. Kong, reclaimed the world record and held it for four years. Chien improved his record four times, before withdrawing from competitive play.

On March 30, 2010, the American rapper Eminem reported a score of 465,800 with photo proof, which would have put him within the top 30 worldwide at the time. As of March 2023, with increasing competition, this score would now sit in 191st place; the score was never officially submitted.

In September 2014, Robbie Lakeman overtook Chien's score. (Note: Lakeman's play session lasted over three hours and ended with a score of 1,141,800, besting Chien's score by 3,200 points.) Lakeman had practiced for two and a half years and was spurred by a bet that he could earn a score within the game's top twenty. He would often stream his attempts live on Twitch, a streaming service, though his initial world record game was performed offline. At the time, a higher record had been set by Dean Saglio, but on an emulated version of the game rather than a physical arcade cabinet. (Note: Saglio's score: 1,206,800.) Lakeman overtook his own record in December and again in June 2015.

In September 2015, Wes Copeland bested Lakeman for the high score. Lakeman reclaimed the record within six hours. Copeland retook the record in January 2016. Shortly after, Lakeman announced his withdrawal from competitive play, though he regained the record in December 2017, and surpassed it in February 2018.

In 2018, Twin Galaxies, which officiates high-score designations, vacated Mitchell's Donkey Kong high scores and banned his future participation after stating that three of his Donkey Kong million-point high scores had not been made on original, unmodified circuit boards. A frame-by-frame analysis of Mitchell's games suggested they were played on an emulator. However, in 2020, Guinness World Records reversed their decision and reinstated Mitchell's previous records, based on new evidence including eyewitness reports and expert testimonials. Twin Galaxies did not reinstate Mitchell's scores. Billy Mitchell and Twin Galaxies sued each other. In September 2022, Tanner Fokkens published a report comparing Billy Mitchell's recorded video to the game emulator MAME and the original video game. He found the video matches the emulator. In February 2023, photos were published of Billy Mitchell next to a Donkey Kong machine with a modified joystick. The report raised doubts about records by Billy Mitchell from 2004 and 2007. In 2024 Billy Mitchell and Twin Galaxies reached a settlement in the lawsuit whereby Twin Galaxies stated it would reinstate Billy Mitchell's scores as a part of a historic database on the site, which is an archive of Twin Galaxies leader boards prior to its change in ownership in 2014 (during which more modern adjudication processes were adopted on the site). Despite the settlement, Billy Mitchell is still not listed on the current Twin Galaxies leader boards, and remains banned from Twin Galaxies. In addition, Billy Mitchell's score of 1,062,800 achieved on July 31, 2011 and verified by a referee is his only score currently listed in the historic database.

== Timeline ==
Date	Score	Player	Notes
April 20, 1982	398,000	Leo Daniels	
July 10, 1982	478,500	Scott Talmage	
July 24. 1982	561,300	Shawn Beard	
October 25, 1982	591,200	Jeffrey Brandt	
November 7, 1982	874,300	Billy Mitchell	(Note: Score currently recognized by Guinness World Records, but unrecognized by Twin Galaxies.)
August 17, 2000	879,200	Tim Sczerby	
June 3, 2005	985,600	Steve Wiebe	
August 3, 2006	1,049,100	Steve Wiebe	
February 26, 2010	1,061,700	Hank Chien	
August 30, 2010	1,064,500	Steve Wiebe	
December 27, 2010	1,068,000	Hank Chien	
February 27, 2011	1,090,400	Hank Chien	
May 18, 2012	1,110,100	Hank Chien	
July 25, 2012	1,127,700	Hank Chien	
November 5, 2012	1,138,600	Hank Chien	
September 5, 2014	1,141,800	Robbie Lakeman	
December 1, 2014	1,144,800	Robbie Lakeman	
September 17, 2015	1,170,500	Wes Copeland	
September 18, 2015	1,172,100	Robbie Lakeman	
October 21, 2015	1,177,200	Robbie Lakeman	
January 4, 2016	1,190,000	Wes Copeland	
April 11, 2016	1,190,200	Robbie Lakeman	
April 19, 2016	1,195,100	Wes Copeland	
May 5, 2016	1,218,000	Wes Copeland	
December 22, 2017	1,230,100	Robbie Lakeman	
February 2, 2018	1,247,700	Robbie Lakeman	
March 17, 2019	1,249,500	John McCurdy	
May 25, 2019	1,259,000	John McCurdy	
June 15, 2020	1,260,700	Robbie Lakeman	
September 22, 2020	1,271,100	Robbie Lakeman	
January 11, 2021	1,272,700	John McCurdy	
June 8, 2021	1,272,800	Robbie Lakeman	

== Other World Record categories ==
There are many other categories for Donkey Kong besides highest score. One of the most popular is the "No Hammer Challenge" where competitors attempt to get the highest score without any use of the game's hammer item. The current world record in this category was set by Jeff Wolfe on July 8, 2008, with a score of 735,100. Some other categories include most points for different levels, fewest points, and most wall jumps on a rivet board.

== Events ==
The Kong-Off was a competitive Donkey Kong tournament first held in 2010. The inaugural Kong-Off was held in New Jersey, and won by Hank Chien.

Both Kong-Off 2 and Kong-Off 3 were held in Denver, and Jeff Willms won both tournaments.

Kong-Off 4 and Kong-Off 5 were held in Pittsburgh. Hank Chien won Kong-Off 4 to claim his second title, and Robbie Lakeman won his first victory at Kong-Off 5.

Kong-Off 6 and Kong-Off 7 were held in Banning, California as part of Arcade Expo. Robbie Lakeman won his second consecutive title at Kong-Off 6, followed by Jeff Wolfe's first win at Kong-Off 7.

As of March 2026, there has been no official Kong-Off 8. However, there have been multiple regional spin-off tournaments. The Australian Kong-Off has held annual tournaments since 2018, and the first UK Kong-Off was held on May 3, 2026.
