= Westward Ho Hotel and Casino =

Former hotel casino in Las Vegas, Nevada

Westward Ho

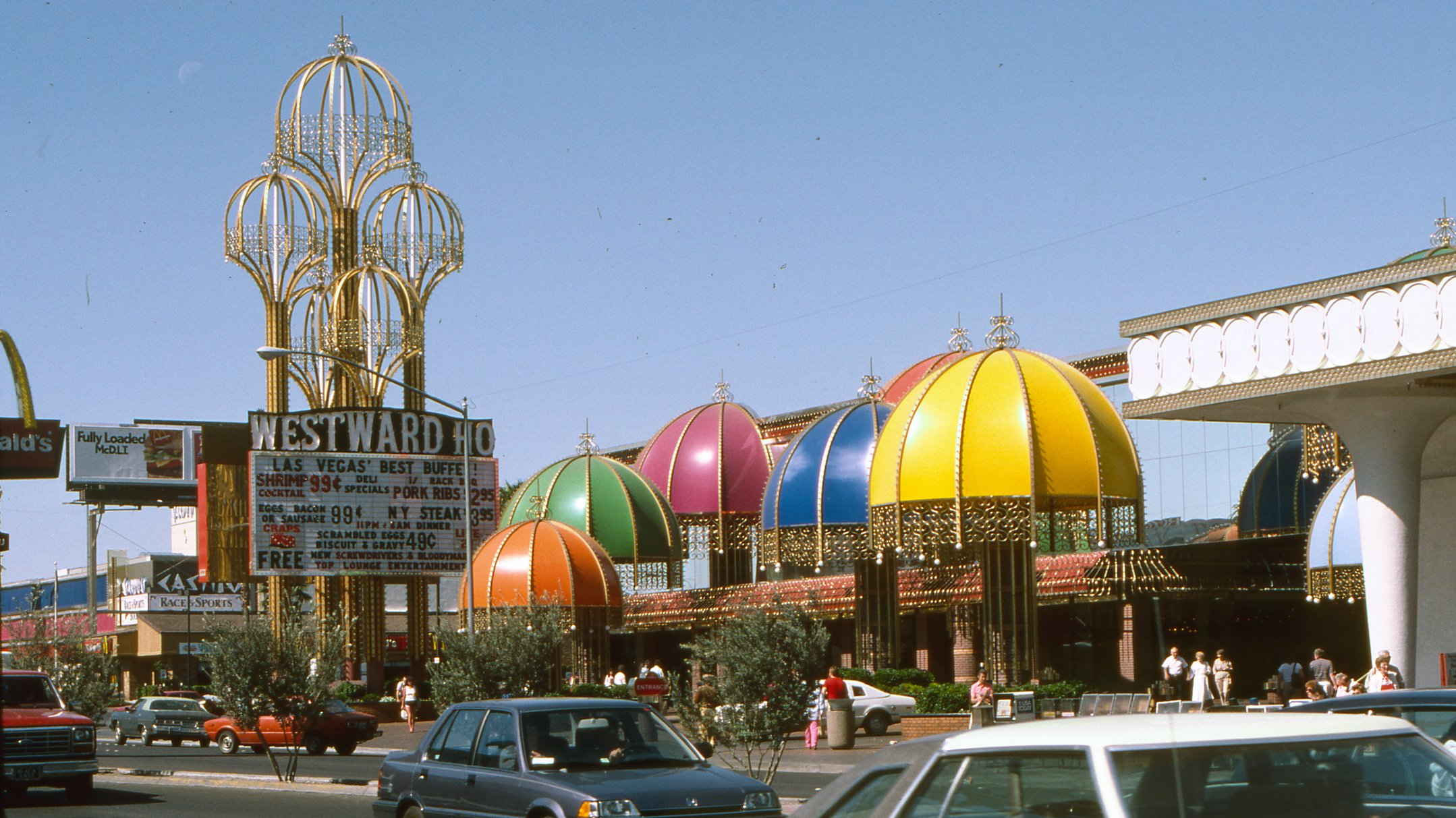
- Westward Ho as seen from the Strip in 1987

- Location within Las Vegas Strip Location within Nevada
- Interactive map of Westward Ho
- Location: Winchester, Nevada 89109; 2900 South Las Vegas Boulevard; 36°8′1″N 115°9′57″W
- Opened: 1963
- Closed: November 17, 2005; 20 years ago
- Theme: Western
- No. of rooms: 777
- Gaming space: 56,000 sq ft (5,200 m^{2})
- Casino type: Land-based
- Owner: Westward Ho Casino, LLC
- Renovated in: 1971

Westward Ho Hotel and Casino was a casino and hotel located on the Las Vegas Strip in Winchester, an unincorporated area of Clark County in the U.S. state of Nevada. The Westward Ho occupied 15 acres, and was the last large motel style property on the Strip. It was a two-story building with parking surrounding the buildings. The casino had many slot machines, and a gaming pit with live dealers.

The Westward Ho opened in 1963. By 1997, it included 777 rooms, a 35,000 sq ft (3,300 m^{2}) casino, and a 900-seat showroom. The Westward Ho closed on November 17, 2005, and was demolished several months later to make way for redevelopment plans which failed to materialize. Instead, a McDonald's opened on part of the old hotel's land in 2008.

== History ==
The Westward Ho was built by Ron's Construction Company, based in Las Vegas. The Westward Ho opened on the Las Vegas Strip in 1963, and was located between the Stardust resort and the future site of the Slots-A-Fun Casino. The rectangular 15-acre (6.1 ha) property stretched west from the Las Vegas Strip to South Industrial Road. The Westward Ho's rooms were located in low-rise motel-style buildings surrounding several pools, all located behind the eventual main casino building, which faced the Las Vegas Strip. The Westward Ho was owned and operated by Dean Petersen, along with his siblings, Faye and Murray Petersen. The Westward Ho's name was a reference to 19th century wagon trains heading west.

In 1969, the Westward Ho was advertised as having over 1,000 rooms, including those in the Satellite wing, and 120 rooms in the Executive Suites. The property also included a 24-hour Denny's restaurant, and a slot arcade known as Nikel Nik's. The Westward Ho casino was added in 1971. The Westward Ho advertised itself as "The World's Largest Motel", and was a financial success for decades after its opening. The casino's interior was featured in the 1996 film, Leaving Las Vegas. In 1996, the Westward Ho paid a disputed $25,000 fine after an undercover Nevada Gaming Control Board agent provided $6,000 to the casino's cashier for safekeeping and then received the money in smaller denominations as requested; to avoid money laundering, Nevada regulations required the same denomination of bills to be returned to the player.

Dean Petersen died in November 1997, at the age of 63. The Westward Ho went up for sale that month. While this happened, Dean Petersen's sister, Faye Johnson, kept the hotel going. In February 1998, it was announced that the Westward Ho and its large property would be bought by American Pastime West LLC, a company based in Manhattan. Johnson said, "This was an important and emotional decision after our family's longtime involvement with the growth of the gaming community in Las Vegas." The Westward Ho was one of the few Las Vegas hotel-casinos to be owned and operated by a local family. At the time of the sale, the Westward Ho had 650 employees, 777 rooms, a 35,000 sq ft (3,300 m^{2}) casino and a 900-seat showroom.

Francis Zarro, the president of American Pastime, had no immediate plans for the Westward Ho, although he planned to eventually acquire or build a Las Vegas golf course that could potentially be integrated into the Westward Ho property. Up to that point, the Westward Ho had gained a repeat clientele of customers from the midwestern United States, and the casino was known for its low-limit table games in comparison to other casinos on the Las Vegas Strip.

In 2003, Texas-based developer Tracy Suttles tried to purchase the Westward Ho for $78 million, but could not secure funding. He tried again in 2004; despite a $1 million deposit, he missed a $2 million payment. Suttles claimed Westward Ho had agreed to loan him the difference, but the owners denied the existence of such an agreement.

In June 2005, Suttles filed a lawsuit against Westward Ho Properties LLC. He alleged a breach of contract, claiming the hotel-casino owners intentionally avoided finalizing the 2003 deal. He believed this was an attempt to sell the property for a higher price due to its increased value since the original agreement. The Westward Ho responded, "Since the prior deal in 2003 ... Suttles had represented that he had readily available equity and financing to consummate the purchase of the property. Yet it became clear that each of these representations was untrue as he failed to meet all deadlines for depositing funds, other than the initial deposits. Sellers were led to believe that Suttles lacked any credibility whatsoever."

=== Closure and planned redevelopment ===
On September 14, 2005, it was announced that the Westward Ho would close on November 17, 2005, as it was in the process of being sold to Centex Destination Properties, a division of Centex Corporation. Centex, along with North Dakota hotel developer Tharaldson Companies, purchased the Westward Ho for $145.5 million, or $9.5 million per acre. Under the companies' agreement, Centex would act as the managing partner in a new project that would replace the Westward Ho. Later that month, Voyager Entertainment International announced an agreement with Centex to build a giant Ferris wheel as part of a master-planned resort to be built on the Westward Ho property. Voyager had unsuccessfully attempted to build its giant Ferris wheel on several different properties in Las Vegas.

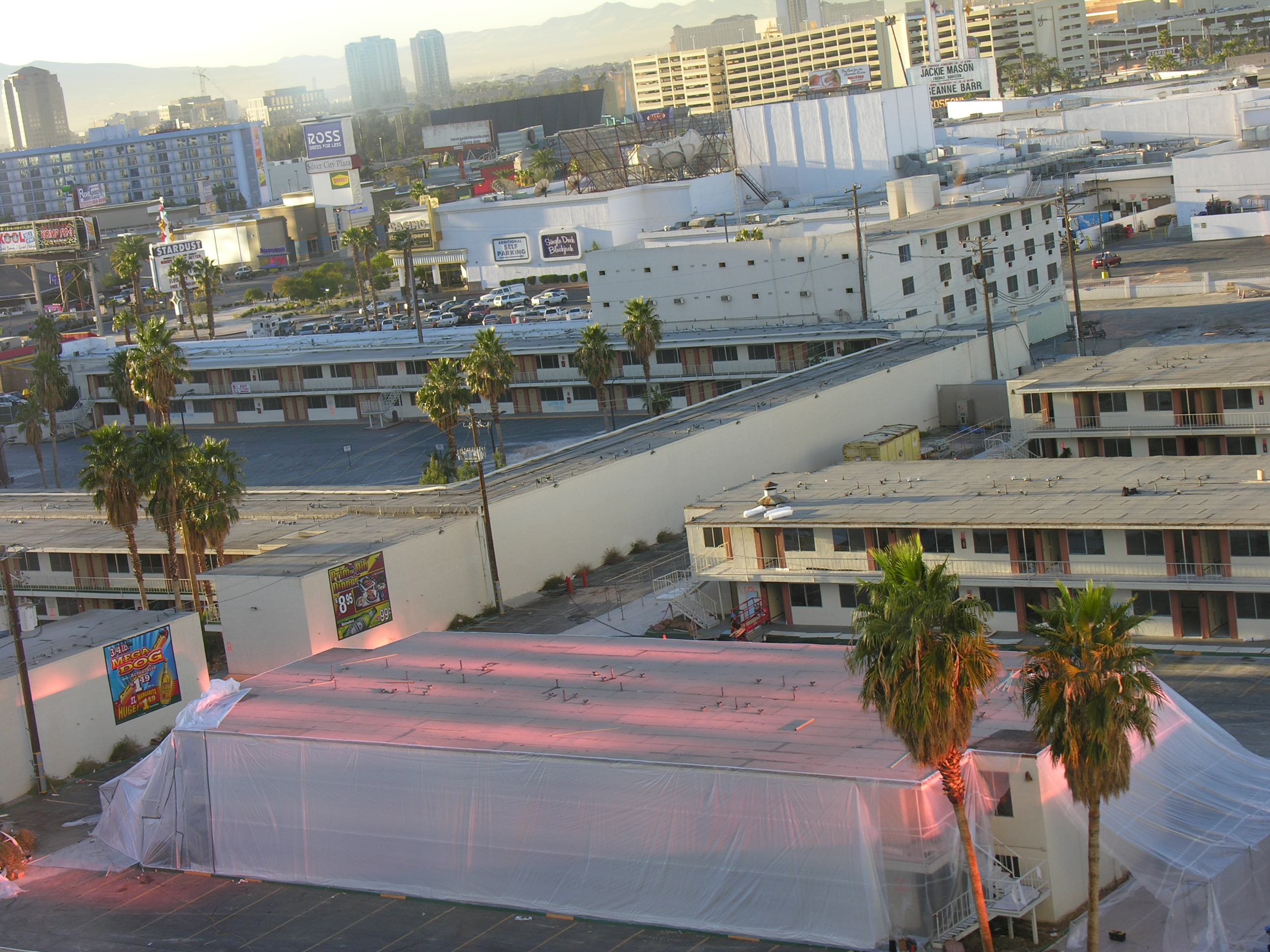
Westward Ho's motel structures during demolition (February 2006)

The Westward Ho closed at 5:00 p.m. on November 17, 2005. Centex's plans for the property included the possibility of multiple hotels, as well as a casino and a residential aspect. Centex considered incorporating the shell of the Westward Ho's front building – facing the Las Vegas Strip – into the design of the new project. Plans for the new project were expected to be announced by mid-2006. The Westward Ho and its 27 buildings were approved for demolition in January 2006. The demolition debris, known as riprap, was used by the Southern Nevada Water Authority and the Las Vegas Wash Coordination Committee to stabilize the Las Vegas Wash.

In June 2006, Centex ceded a majority of its share in the property to Tharaldson Companies. That month, owner Gary Tharaldson planned to propose a $1.8 billion mixed-use project with 1,000 condo hotel units, 600 condominium units, 600 hotel rooms, an 80,000 sq ft (7,400 m^{2}) casino, and 200,000 sq ft (19,000 m^{2}) of retail space. By July 2006, Harrah's Entertainment had picked up options to purchase the Westward Ho property, and began negotiations to sell the land to Boyd Gaming – developer of the adjacent Echelon Place – in exchange for the Barbary Coast hotel-casino, also on the Las Vegas Strip. The exchange was completed later that year, at which point the Westward Ho land was valued at $101.6 million. Boyd planned to use the former Westward Ho property for a potential future expansion of Echelon Place, although Boyd later canceled the entire project amid the Great Recession. A McDonald's opened on a portion of the Westward Ho land in December 2008, fronting the Las Vegas Strip.

In 2012, the Las Vegas Sun included the Westward Ho on its list of "extinct casino brands we'd like to see return to the Strip," writing, "For a town still full of cowboys, we sure are short on Western themed casinos."

== Attractions ==
In 1983, 80 feet (24 m) high gold-colored umbrella-shaped lights were installed at the front of the property, along with shorter umbrellas featuring green and orange awnings. The neon umbrella design was later copied by several other Las Vegas properties, including the Golden Gate Casino, the Las Vegas Club, and Bally's Las Vegas.

Inside the casino, the prevalent color scheme was brown and green, emphasizing the brass and Dark Oak fixtures. A water fountain inside the casino poured water down a pyramid of champagne glasses. In the 1980s and early 1990s The Westward Ho had unique features for all guests such as the 24/7 free champagne cocktails and free bloody marys at a large fountain with a drink attendant. The casino was also known for its large "Mega Dog" hot dogs. While other casinos on the Strip featured table minimums at $5, $10, or $25 minimums, "The Ho" often had table minimums as low as $1, which made it popular with avid gamblers as well as locals.

=== Performers ===
In 1988, the "Hot Lava" dance show debuted at the Westward Ho. Local entertainer Robbie Howard, who did impressions of celebrities, performed in a show at the Westward Ho called Hurray America, which ran from 1993 to 1999. Marty Allen and Karon Kate Blackwell performed a comedy show at the Westward Ho during 1996. In 2001, the Westward Ho featured The Doo Wop '50s, a musical show offered with a buffet dinner. Our Way, a Rat Pack tribute band, debuted at the Westward Ho in January 2003, as part of the casino's "Puttin' on the Ritz" show that was offered with a buffet dinner.

As of 2004, "Hot Lava" was one of the longest-running productions in Las Vegas, and was part of the Ho-Waiian Luau Dinner and Show, which was one of four promotional events annually held by the hotel-casino during different times of the year; the other events were Puttin' on the Ritz, Fabulous '50s Doo-Wop Dinner and Show, and the country/western-themed Grubstake Jamboree Steak Barbeque and Show. In June 2004, a new musical show called "Shake, Rattle and Rock" was introduced in the Westward Ho's showroom – known as the Crown Room – for a two-month period, as part of the Fabulous '50s Doo-Wop Dinner and Show. Howard returned to the Westward Ho for afternoon shows beginning in January 2005.

== The Ho ==
In November 2004, a new 13,000 sq ft (1,200 m^{2}) business known as The Ho was opened on the rear portion of the Westward Ho's property, at 2920 South Industrial Road. The Ho offered a small casino with five table games, 200 slot machines, and a sports book. Also offered was a convenience store, a gas station, a lounge and a restaurant. The Ho had 130 employees and 300 parking spaces, and was the only gas station on Industrial Road. The Las Vegas Review-Journal noted that The Ho had "possibly the smallest sports book ever built, with four television screens."

Management at the Westward Ho hoped to have The Ho become a popular locals casino, particularly among people who worked in the hundreds of businesses along Industrial Road. Other potential clientele would include people who used Industrial Road to avoid traffic on the nearby Las Vegas Strip. As of January 2005, The Ho's lounge area was used for karaoke contests. Management planned to ultimately introduce live entertainment for five to six nights a week. "The Ho" was a shortened name for the Westward Ho that had been commonly used by customers. The Ho closed on November 25, 2005.
