= Robie =

Robie may refer to:

== People ==
=== Given name ===
- Robie Harris, American children's author
- Robie Lester (1925–2005), American voice actress and singer
- Robie Macauley (1919–1995), American writer, editor and critic
- Robie Marcus Hooker Palmer (1941–2013), American diplomat
- Robie Lewis Reid (1866–1945), Canadian historian and jurist
- Robie Porter (1941–2021), Australian country- and pop-rock musician, producer, and record label owner
- Robie Robertson (1931–2019), American screenwriter and visual effects artist

=== Surname ===
- Carl Robie (1945–2011), American swimmer
- David Robie (born 1945), New Zealand journalist
- Derrick Robie (1988–1993), American murder victim
- Edward D. Robie (1831–1911), United States Navy officer
- Frederick Robie (1822–1912), American politician
- Jean-Baptiste Robie (1821–1910), Belgian painter
- John Robie, American musician and record producer
- Reuben Robie (1799–1872), American politician
- Simon Bradstreet Robie (1770–1858), Canadian politician
- Thomas Robie (1689–1729), American scientist and physician
- Virginia Huntington Robie (1868–1957), American writer
- Wendy Robie (born 1953), American actress

== Other uses ==
- Robie (automobile), produced in 1914
- Robie House, a U.S. National Historic Landmark now on the campus of the University of Chicago
- Robie Street, a road in Halifax, Nova Scotia
- ROBIE Award, presented by the Jackie Robinson Foundation

== See also ==
- Robey
- Roby (disambiguation)
