= Bryson Burroughs =

American painter

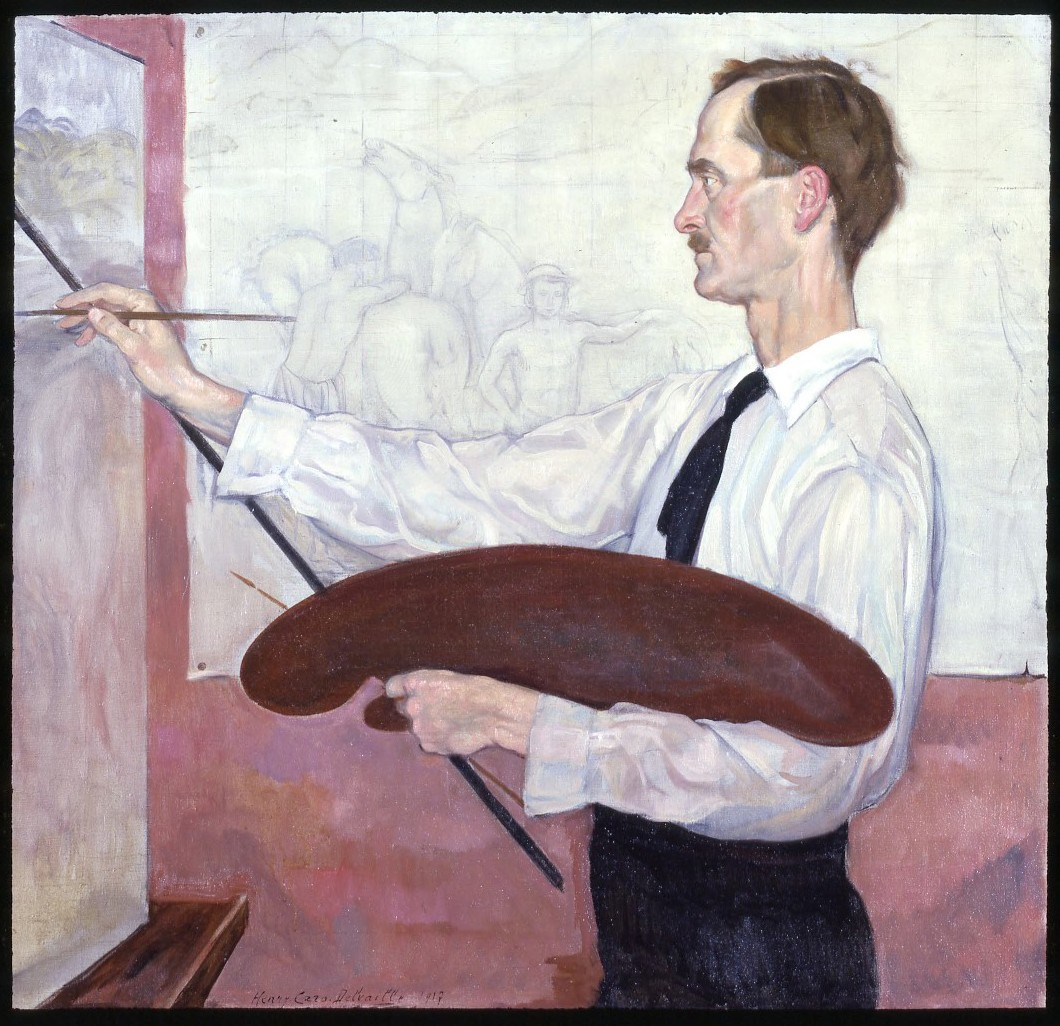
Portrait of Bryson Burroughs by Henry Caro-Delvaille

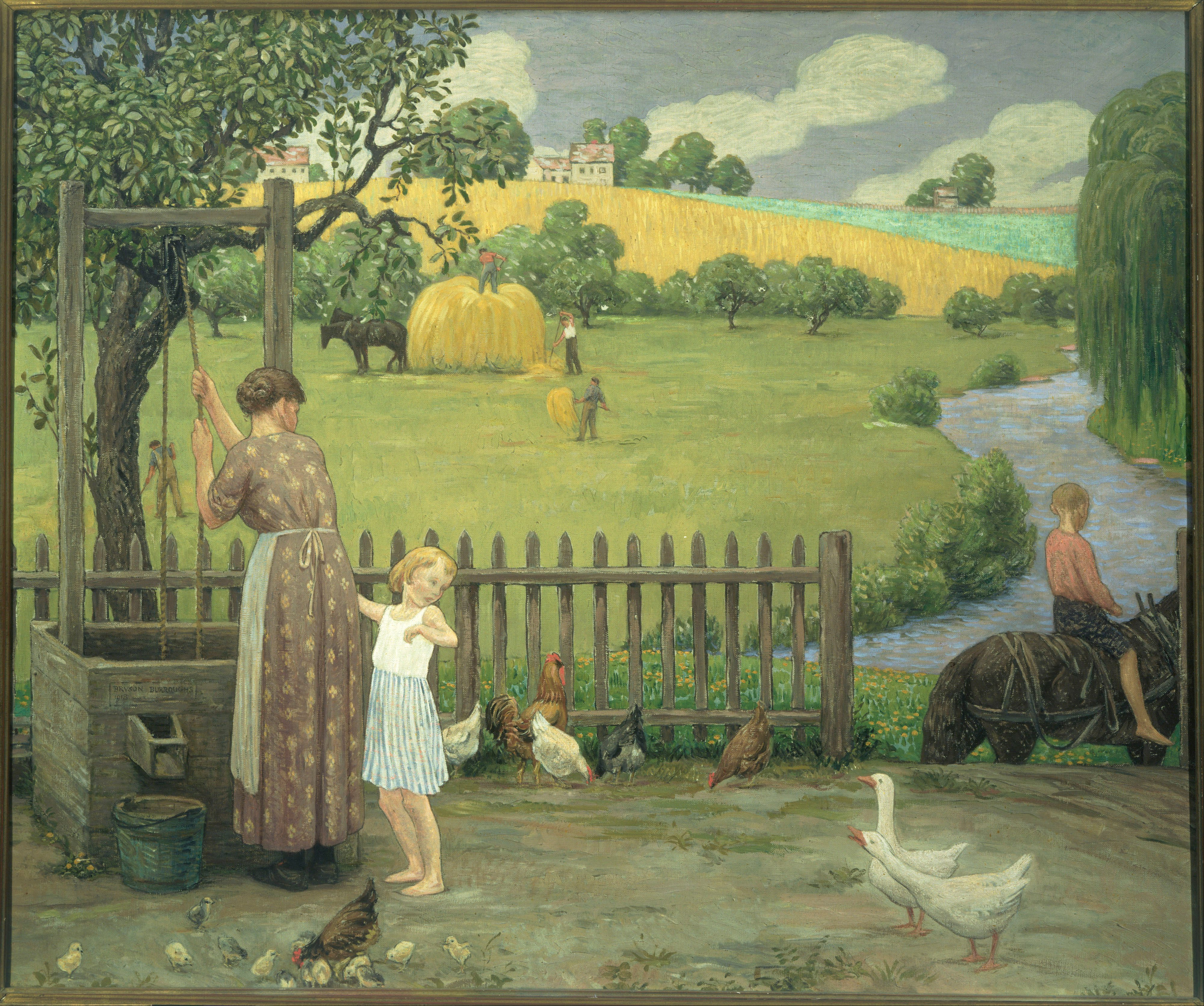
June, 1918, oil on canvas, 30 x 36 in, the Phillips Collection, Washington, D.C.

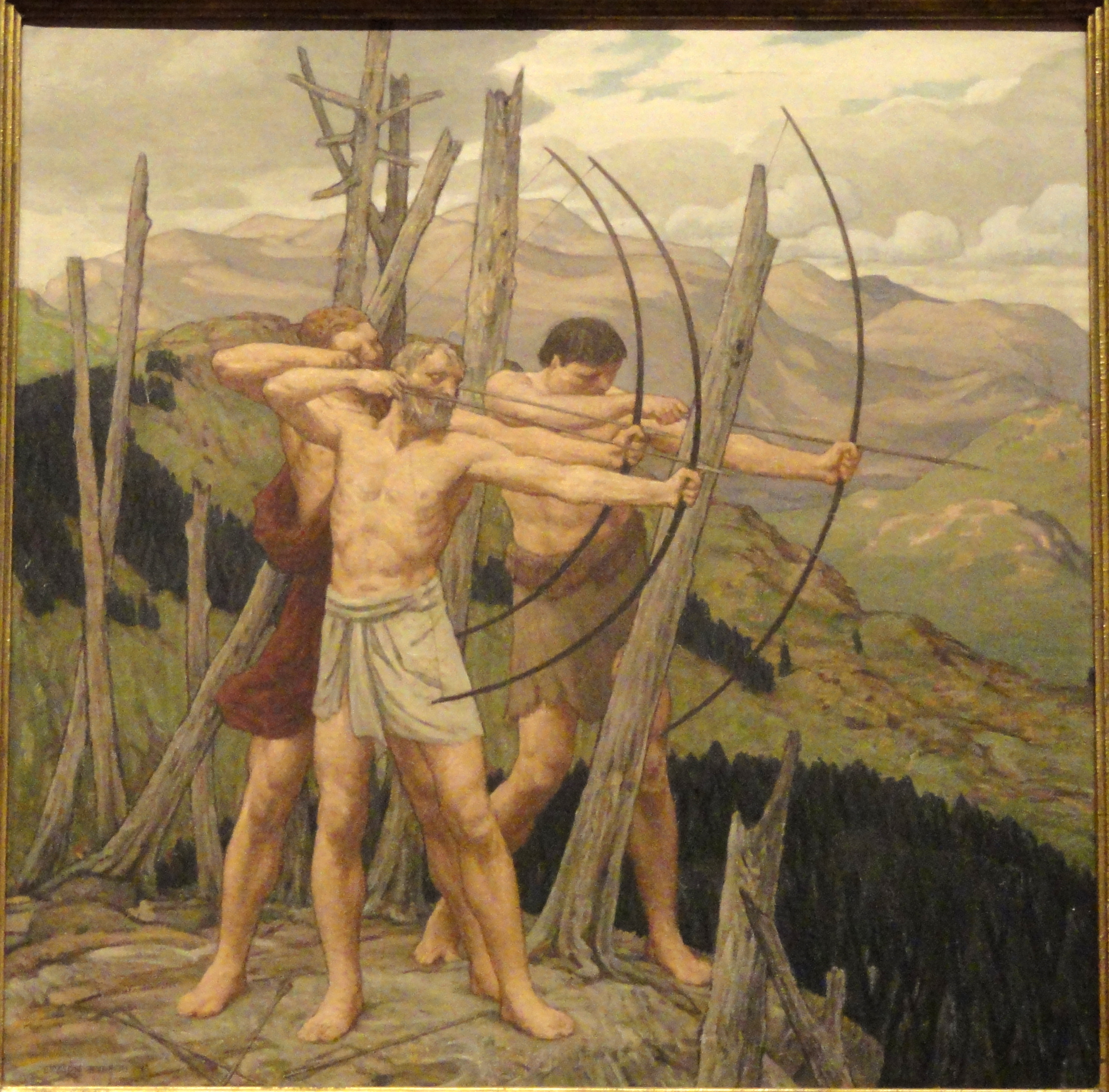
The Archers, 1917, oil on canvas, 30 x 30 in, Smithsonian American Art Museum

Henry Bryson Burroughs (8 September 1869 – November 1934) was an American artist and employee of the Metropolitan Museum of Art. He began there as an assistant to Curator of Paintings Roger Fry, and when Fry left in 1909, Burroughs assumed the role. His purchase of View of the Domaine Saint-Joseph for the museum became the first of Paul Cézanne's paintings to enter a public collection. He also purchased the Crucifixion and Last Judgement diptych and The Harvesters for the Met. Before dedicating himself to painting, Burroughs was a successful racing cyclist who seriously contemplated turning professional in that discipline.

== Early life ==
Bryson Burroughs was born in 1869 in Hyde Park, Massachusetts; then an independent suburb of Boston. He grew up in Cincinnati, Ohio. After high school, he began to pursue painting, and attended the Art Students League of New York and won a scholarship to learn in academies in Paris. There he worked under Luc-Olivier Merson and met noted painter Pierre Puvis de Chavannes and would bring him his work for advice.

In 1895, Burroughs and his wife lived for several months in Florence, Italy. In 1909, he became the Curator of Paintings of the Metropolitan Museum of Art.

== Personal life ==
In England in 1893, Burroughs married the sculptor Edith Woodman; they remained together until her death in January 1916.

His daughter Betty was married to painter Reginald Marsh from 1923 to 1933.
