= Robert Robertson =

Robert, Bob or Bobby Robertson may refer to:

== Arts and entertainment ==
- Robert Robertson (actor) (1930–2001), Scottish actor and director
- Bob Robertson (comedian), Canadian radio and television comedian
- Robert Robertson (singer), Scottish singer with Skipinnish and with Tide Lines
- Robert Robertson III, a fictional character from 2025 video game Dispatch

== Politicians ==
- Robert Gordon Robertson (1917–2013), Canadian politician
- Robert Robertson (Nova Scotia politician) (1817–1901), Canadian politician
- Robert Chisholm Robertson (1861–1930), Scottish political activist
- Robert Robertson (Australian politician) (1887–1960)

== Sciences ==
- Howard P. "Bob" Robertson (1903–1961), American mathematician and physicist
- R. G. Hamish Robertson (born 1943), Canadian physicist
- Robert Alexander Robertson (1873–1935), Scottish botanist
- Robert H. S. Robertson (1911–1999), Scottish chemist and mineralogist
- Robert Robertson (chemist) (1869–1949), Scottish chemist
- Robert Robertson (physician) (1742–1829), British physician, Fellow of the Royal Society

== Sports ==
- Bob Robertson (born 1946), baseball player
- Bobby Robertson (1917–2009), American football player
- Robert Robertson (field hockey) (born 1938), Rhodesian Olympic hockey player
- Robert Robertson (footballer) (fl. 1900s), Scottish footballer (St Mirren)
- Robert Robertson (rugby union), Scottish rugby union player
- Robert Roberston (long jumper) (1912–1991), Scottish long jumper

== Other ==
- R. H. Robertson (1849–1919), American architect
- Robert Robertson (Home and Away), a fictional character from Home and Away
- Robert S. Robertson (1839–1906), U.S. Army soldier and Medal of Honor recipient

== See also ==
- Robertson (surname)
- Robert Roberson case, Texas execution case
- Robbie Robertson (disambiguation)
- Robert Robinson (disambiguation)
