= Robert E. Jones =

Robert E. Jones may refer to:

- Robert E. Jones Jr. (1912–1997), US House of Representative from Alabama
- Robert E. Jones (judge) (1927–2025), Oregon Supreme Court and federal district judge
- Robert Earl Jones (1910–2006), American actor and father of James Earl Jones
- Robert Edmond Jones (1887–1954), American theater designer of sets, lighting, costumes
- Robert Elijah Jones (1872–1960), United States clergyman, Bishop of the Methodist Episcopalian Church

== See also ==
- Robbie Jones (disambiguation)
- Robert Jones (disambiguation)
