= Roby =

Roby may refer to:

== Places ==
- Roby, Merseyside
- Roby, Texas
- Roby, Poland

== People ==
- Robbie, a list of people with the given name or surname Robbie, Robbi, Robby, or Roby

== See also ==
- North Roby, Texas – ghost town
- Robey
- Robie (disambiguation)
