= Bobby Robinson =

Bobby Robinson may refer to:

- Bobby Robinson (baseball) (1903–2002), Negro league baseball player
- Bobby Robinson (record producer) (1917–2011), American independent record producer
- Bobby Robinson (footballer, born 1950) (1950–1996), Scottish football midfielder
- Bobby Robinson (footballer, born 1921) (1921–1975), English football goalkeeper
- Melville Marks Robinson (1888–1974), Canadian journalist and sports executive, also known as "Bobby Robinson"

== See also ==
- Robert Robinson (disambiguation)
- Robbie Robinson (disambiguation)
