= Robert Henry Robinson =

Robert Henry Robinson may refer to:

- Robert Robinson (broadcaster) (1927–2011), English radio and television presenter
- Robert H. Robinson, American minister, educator, Black community leader

== See also ==
- Robert Robinson (disambiguation)
