= Robert Robinson =

Robert Robinson may refer to:

== Politicians ==
- Robert Robinson (Australian politician) (1811–1852), Australian politician
- Robert Robinson (Canadian politician) (1826–1885), Canadian merchant and politician in New Brunswick
- Robert E. Robinson (1947–1989), Savannah City Council member and attorney
- Robert P. Robinson (Delaware politician) (1869–1939), American banker and politician, governor of Delaware
- Robert P. Robinson (Wisconsin politician) (1884–1953), Wisconsin state senator
- Robert Thomson Robinson (1867–1926), Australian politician

== Sportsmen ==
- Robert Robinson (cricketer, born 1765) (1765–1822), English cricketer
- Ginney Robinson (Robert Robinson) (fl. 1902–1911), American baseball player
- Bob Robinson (American football) (fl. 1916), American football coach
- Robert Robinson (footballer) (1906–1990), English association footballer
- Bob Robinson (footballer, born 1910) (1910–1989), English football goalkeeper
- Bob Robinson (Australian footballer) (1914–2001), Australian rules footballer
- Robert Robinson (cricketer, born 1924) (1924–1973), English cricketer
- Jackie Robinson (basketball, born 1927) (1927–2022, Robert Lloyd Jackson Robinson), American basketball player
- Bob Robinson (wrestler) (born 1958), Canadian wrestler
- Robert Robinson (rower) (fl. 1978–1981), New Zealand rower
- Rob Robinson (ice hockey) (born 1967), Canadian ice hockey player
- Rob Robinson (American football) (born 1977), American football coach

== Others ==
- Robert Robinson (phonetician) (c. 1600–c. 1660), English phonetician
- Robert Robinson (Dissenting minister) (1726–1791), controversial Unitarian minister
- Robert Robinson (Baptist) (1735–1790), Baptist minister and scholar of Cambridge
- Robert Spencer Robinson (1809–1889), British naval officer
- Robert Robinson (chemist) (1886–1975), British chemist, Nobel laureate
- Robert G. Robinson (1896–1974), American US Marine Corps officer, Medal of Honor recipient
- Robert H. Robinson (1824–1909), American minister, educator, Black community leader
- Robert Robinson (engineer) (1907–1994), lived in the Soviet Union
- Robert Robinson (broadcaster) (1927–2011), British broadcaster
- Robert Robinson (Neighbours), fictional character in 2006–2007
- Robert Anthony Robinson (1904–1979), New Zealand inorganic chemist
- Robert Robinson Taylor (1868–1942), American architect and educator
- Robert Robinson, character in This Country
- Bob Lambert (undercover police officer) (born 1952), British police officer, used the pseudonym Bob Robinson

== See also ==
- Robert Robertson (disambiguation)
- Robert Henry Robinson (disambiguation)
- Bobby Robinson (disambiguation)
- Robbie Robinson (disambiguation)
- Robby Robbins, American politician
- Bob Robison, American canoeist
