= Anna Steinhouse-Kandelaki =

British contemporary figurative artist

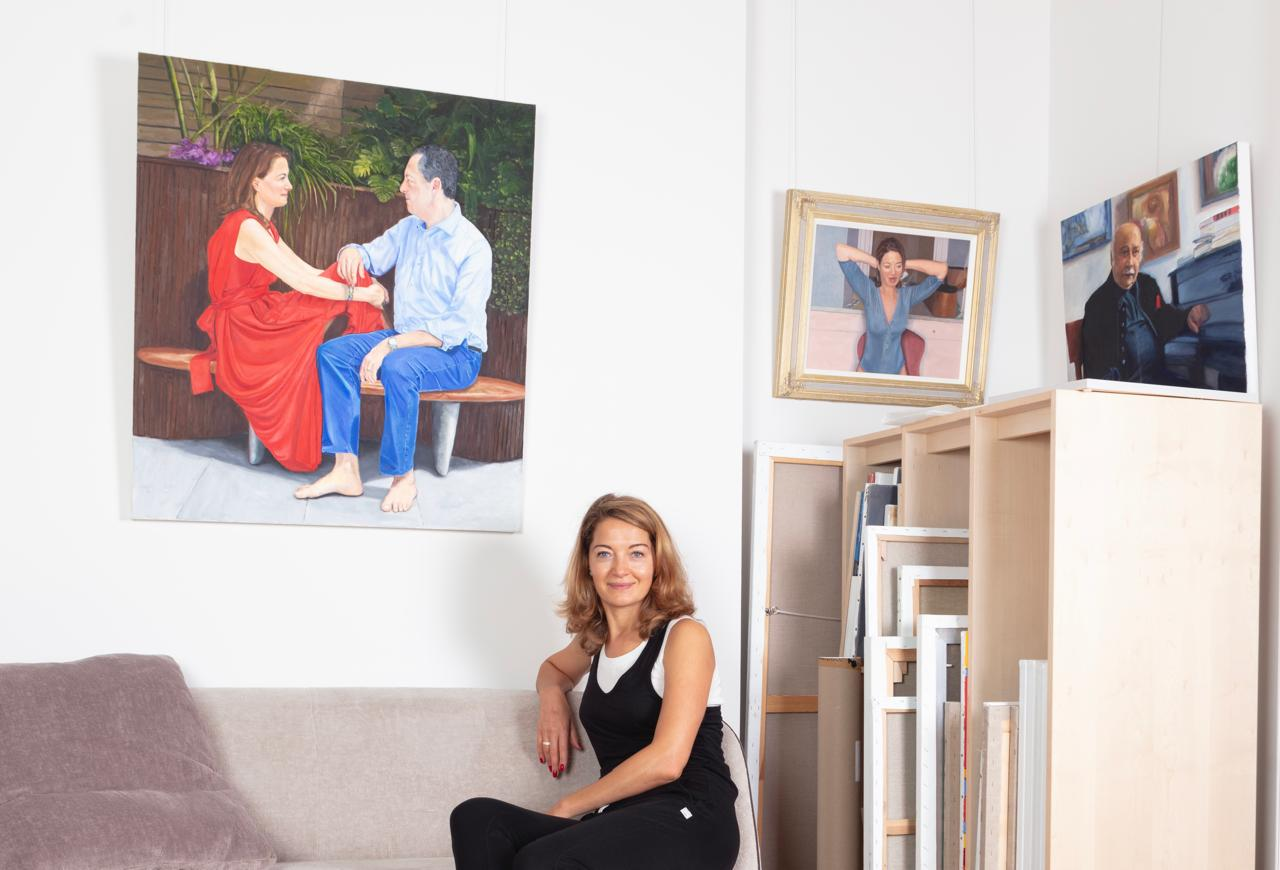
- Born: 1972 (age 53–54); Tbilisi, Georgian SSR, Soviet Union
- Education: Art Academy, Royal Drawing School, Heatherley School of Fine Art, Slade School of Fine Art, University of Surrey (MBA), Tbilisi State University BA (Hon) in Economics
- Notable work: Portrait of Irene, Portrait of Jordan, Immersion, Floating
- Style: Fine Art, Portraiture, Landscape Painting, Oil, Drawing
- Website: https://www.annasteinhouse.com/

Anna Steinhouse-Kandelaki (born 1972) is a Georgian-born British contemporary figurative artist based in London. She is known for her emotive portraiture and landscapes, often incorporating psychological depth and symbolic elements inspired by her Georgian heritage.

== Early life and education ==
Steinhouse-Kandelaki was born in 1972, in Tbilisi, then part of the Soviet Union. She initially pursued a career in Management of Human and Natural Resources from Tbilisi State University. In 2000, she emigrated to the United Kingdom. The following year, she completed an MBA with Distinction at the University of Surrey, supported by a British Council Chevening Scholarship.

Before transitioning to a full-time artistic practice, Steinhouse-Kandelaki worked for 15 years in the banking sector. In 2012, she began formal studies in art at several British institutions, including the Slade School of Fine Art, Heatherley School of Fine Art, the Royal Drawing School, Hampstead School of Art, and the Art Academy. She earned a Contemporary Portrait Diploma from the Art Academy in 2017.

== Career ==
Steinhouse-Kandelaki's work is characterized by a focus on psychological realism and narrative portraiture. Her paintings often reflect her cultural background, incorporating symbolic motifs drawn from Georgian traditions and identity. She has cited British artists such as Lucian Freud, John Singer Sargent, and David Hockney as key influences.

Her first major solo exhibition, Home Away from Home, was held at the Embassy of Georgia in London and explored themes related to the Georgian diaspora. Since then, she has exhibited her work in solo and group shows in London, Tbilisi, Lucca, Washington, D.C., and Portugal. Her paintings are held in private collections across the United Kingdom, Europe, the United States, Georgia, and the Middle East.

== Personal life ==
Steinhouse-Kandelaki lives in London with her husband Robbie Steinhouse. They have three grown up children. She maintains strong ties to Georgia, frequently visiting the country and drawing inspiration from its landscapes and cultural heritage. She is the great-niece of Nikoloz Kandelaki, a prominent Georgian sculptor and one of the founders of the modern Georgian sculpture movement and the Tbilisi State Academy of Arts.

== Exhibitions ==
- 2025 (22 - 24 August) Art4us Group Exhibition, Stockholm
- 2025 (11 May - 29 June) ‘Tell Me Something with the Flowers’, group exhibition, The Alley Gallery, Washington DC
- 2023 (15 - 26 November) 'Abor Vitae', group exhibition, Casermetta San Regolo, Lucca
- 2023 (9 - 14 November) 'Vivere in Blu', group exhibition, Chiesa Santa Caterina, Lucca
- 2023 (October) 'AS and The First Element' part of Art4Us group exhibition, Tbilisi, Georgia
- 2023 'Reflections' group exhibition, London
- 2023 'Calm' selected for Biennale, Eztremoz, Alentejo, Portugal
- 2023 'Magic Touch' at Scents of It all, group exhibition, Washington, US
- 2022 Primrose Hill Art Trail
- 2019 'Reflections', Solo Exhibition, Georgia
- 2018 'Sisters and Friends', group exhibition, London
- 2018 'Diverse Portraits: A Collective', group show, London
- 2018 'Floating' The Royal Society of Portrait Artists, annual exhibition, Mall Galleries, London
- 2017 'Home away from Home' Solo Exhibition, Embassy of Georgia, London
