= Robert Harte =

Robert Harte may refer to:

- Robert Sheldon Harte (1915–1940), American Communist
- Robert Harte (TV personality), New Zealand lawyer and TV personality

== See also ==
- Robert Hart (disambiguation)
