= Robbie Kelleher (soccer) =

Irish footballer (born 1984)

Personal information
- Full name: Robert Kelleher
- Date of birth: 14 February 1984 (age 42)
- Place of birth: Limerick, Ireland
- Position: Forward

Youth career
- Fairview Rangers

Senior career*
Years	Team	Apps	(Gls)
2005–2006	Limerick	62	(10)
2007	Shamrock Rovers	3	(2)
2007–2009	Fairview Rangers		
2009–2010	Limerick	25	(4)
2012-2012	Athlone Town	1	(0)

International career
2002–2003	Republic of Ireland U17		
- * Club domestic league appearances and goals as of 18:18, 21 June 2013 (UTC)

Robbie Kelleher (born 14 February 1984) is a former League of Ireland footballer.

He originally transferred from the Limerick junior club Fairview Rangers to Limerick F.C. in 2005. He made 62 league appearances for Limerick over the following two seasons and scored eight league goals before leaving the club to sign for Shamrock Rovers in January 2007.

Kelleher spent just a few months with Shamrock Rovers, scoring twice in just 3 league appearances, before asking to be released from his contract due to the pressure of travelling to Dublin for games. Then Rovers manager Pat Scully was quoted as saying "He's as disappointed as we are – and we're very disappointed. Robbie's a player of great ability but having to travel up from Limerick for training and to play in games proved too much for him. We respect his decision and obviously wish him well in his future career".

After two seasons with non-league Fairview, Kelleher returned to league football in the summer of 2009, signing once again for Limerick F.C. He played 13 times in the league over the latter half of 2009 and remained with the club into 2010, making a further 12 league appearances before being released in July 2010.

After playing with non-league club Ballynanty Rovers, Kelleher signed for Athlone Town in February 2012. While he played a number of cup games for Athlone, owing to injury he did not play in any league games.
