= Francis Zarro =

Convict and activist

Francis A. Zarro Jr.
- Born: Francis A. Zarro Jr. 1951 (age 74–75); The Bronx, New York, United States
- Occupations: Former entrepreneur; disbarred lawyer; activist
- Years active: 1989-2003 (fraudulent activities), 2013-present (activism)
- Employer: First Fairfield Associates (consultant)
- Organization: Skidmore College Restorative Justice Project
- Known for: Orchestrating fraudulent real estate schemes
- Status: Convicted
- Motive: Financial gain
- Conviction: November 2004
- Criminal charges: Grand larceny, scheming to defraud, possession of stolen property
- Penalty: 7 to 21 years in state prison
- Capture status: Apprehended

Details
- Victims: 28 individuals and businesses; Hudson Valley Philharmonic; potential investors in Sanford, Maine
- Date: November 2004 (sentencing)
- Span of crimes: 1989 – 2003 (indictment)
- Country: United States
- States: New York, Maine
- Locations: Dutchess County, Putnam County, Sanford
- Targets: Real estate investors, non-profit organizations

Francis A. Zarro Jr. (born 1951) is an American former entrepreneur and disbarred lawyer known for his involvement in a series of fraudulent schemes targeting real estate investors. Zarro gained attention for his extravagant lifestyle and promises of lucrative returns on investments. However, it was revealed that he had engaged in fraud, deception, and other illegal activities, resulting in the loss of more than $25 million from unsuspecting victims. After his release from prison, Zarro became involved in criminal justice reform efforts and has worked as an activist in initiatives such as the Skidmore College Restorative Justice Project. Zarro's son Andrew Zarro is a member of Portland, Maine City Council and ran for mayor there in 2023.

== Career and fraudulent activities ==
Francis A. Zarro Jr. grew up in the Bronx. Over a span of 13 years, beginning in 1989, Zarro orchestrated a series of fraudulent real estate schemes resulting in the loss of more than $25 million from unsuspecting victims. He operated through two corporations, American Past Time Holdings and New Deal Projects, often involving partners in his activities. Victims were lured into making significant upfront payments, sometimes amounting to millions of dollars, only to later find out that the promised real estate deals had fallen through, resulting in the loss of their investments.

Zarro utilized the funds obtained to support his lavish lifestyle and create an appearance of legitimacy. He rented office spaces, hired high-priced law firms, and used transportation services such as limousines to project an image of financial capability. However, it was revealed that the rent on these office spaces often went unpaid, and the offices were abandoned after meetings with prospective investors.

During his fraudulent activities, Zarro targeted various victims, including a hometown friend of Governor George Pataki, the Hudson Valley Philharmonic, and potential investors in a resort casino in Sanford, Maine. Zarro declared bankruptcy twice, with a personal bankruptcy case amounting to $20 million in 1994 and a corporate bankruptcy case totaling $10 million in 1997. He was also disbarred in 2000 for failing to repay unused retainer fees totaling hundreds of thousands of dollars.

== Legal actions and consequences ==
In February 2003, a 39-count indictment was handed down by a Dutchess County grand jury, charging Zarro with multiple counts of fraud and related offenses. The New York Attorney General, Eliot Spitzer, accused Zarro of defrauding 28 victims, including businesses and individuals, by misrepresenting financing, trade records, and critical details about the investment deals.

Zarro pleaded not guilty to the charges and was released on a $500,000 bond. The charges carried penalties of 10 to 30 years in prison. After a three-month non-jury trial before Putnam County Judge James Rooney, Zarro was convicted of 13 counts of grand larceny, scheming to defraud, and possession of stolen property. He was sentenced to seven to 21 years in state prison in November 2004.

In October 2013, Zarro was granted parole.

After his release from prison, Frank Zarro became involved in the Skidmore College Restorative Justice Project in New York. Working alongside the college and other stakeholders, Zarro contributed to the development and implementation of initiatives aimed at promoting restorative justice principles within the criminal justice system. Zarro is a consultant at First Fairfield Associates, a Saratoga Springs-based firm specializing in venture capital and development consulting. His son, Andrew Zarro, a member of Portland, Maine City Council who unsuccessfully ran for mayor in 2023, also worked at First Fairfield Associates. In August 2012 Andrew coordinated a conference on restorative justice where he discussed having an incarcerated parent.
