= Mike Roby =

English rugby league footballer

Personal information
- Full name: Michael Roby
- Born: 2 April 1986 (age 39) St Helens, Merseyside

Playing information
- Position: centre
Club
| Years | Team | Pld | T | G | FG | P |
|---|---|---|---|---|---|---|
| 2004–04 | St Helens | 1 | 0 | 0 | 0 | 0 |
| 2005–09 | Sheffield Eagles | 23 | 3 | 0 | 0 | 12 |
| | Total | 24 | 3 | 0 | 0 | 12 |

Mike Roby born 2 April 1986 in St Helens, Merseyside, England was a professional rugby league footballer for the Sheffield Eagles. He played as a centre. He also previously played for St. Helens in the Super League.
