= Robie (automobile) =

Defunct American motor vehicle manufacturer

Robie Motor Car Company
- Industry: Automotive
- Founded: 1914; 112 years ago
- Founder: Fred G. Robie
- Defunct: 1915; 111 years ago
- Fate: closed
- Headquarters: Chicago, Illinois, United States
- Products: Cyclecars

The Brass era Robie cyclecar was manufactured by the Robie Motor Car Company in Chicago, Illinois in 1914.

== History ==
The Robie used a 4-cylinder Perkins engine of 1.6 liters. It was a side-by-side two-seater. It had a rounded radiator with a streamline body and disc wheels. The Robie was priced at $450, equivalent to $14,464 in 2025. The car was guaranteed to go 45mph and 45mpg of gasoline.

Fred G. Robie had been in the automobile accessories business before building his cyclecar. The Robie was built by Massnick-Phipps Manufacturing company in Detroit Michigan. Robie planned to have a second generation of his cyclecar built by Pullman in York, Pennsylvania, but his money ran out.
