= Henry Caro-Delvaille =

French painter (1876–1926)

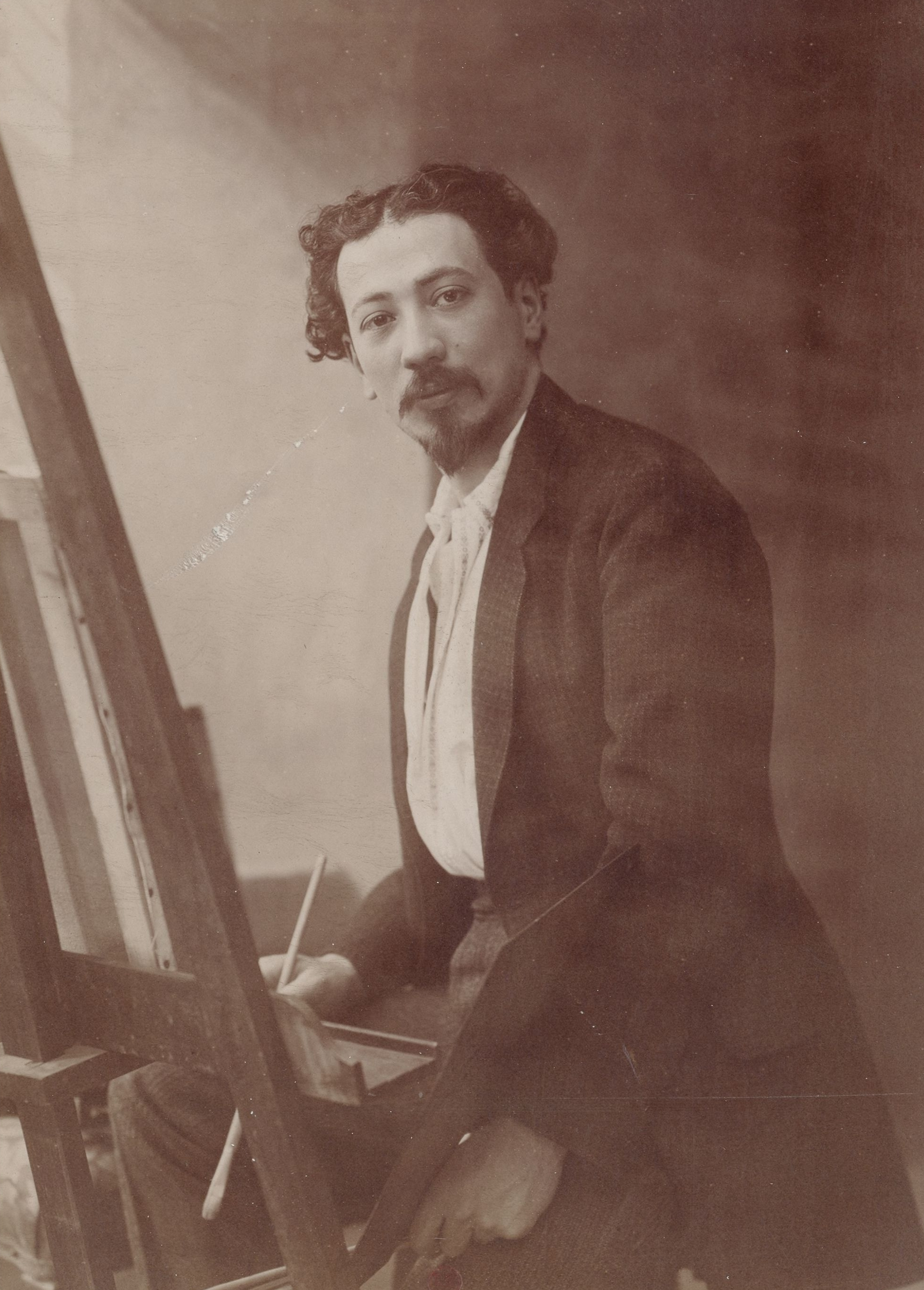
- Henry Caro-Delvaille by Nadar
- Born: 1876; Bayonne
- Died: 1926 (aged 49–50)
- Occupation: Painter
- Relatives: Gabriel Roby (brother-in-law); Claude Lévi-Strauss (nephew)

Henry Caro-Delvaille (1876–1926) was a French painter.

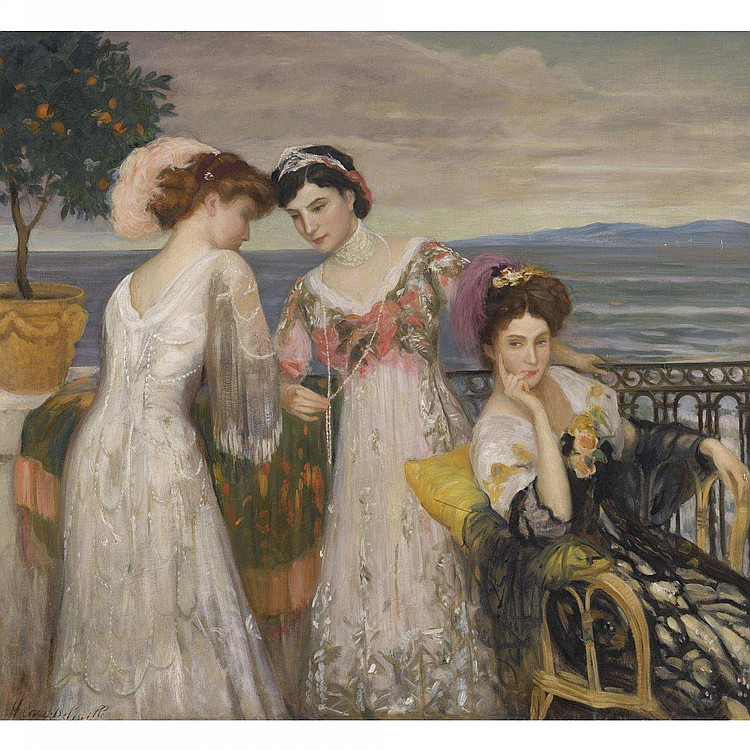
Le beau monde, Biarritz, circa 1900.
