= Robert H. S. Robertson =

Scottish chemist and mineralogist

Robert Hugh Stannus Robertson FGS FRSE (1911–1999) was a 20th-century Scottish chemist and mineralogist. He was a world authority on clay minerals.

== Life ==
He was born in Greenwich east of London on 17 June 1911 the son of Sir Robert Robertson. He was educated at Rugby School. He then studied Chemistry at Cambridge University graduating MA around 1930. On graduating he spent some time mapping Dicksonland in Spitzbergen where the glacier Robertsonbreen is named after him.

In 1933 he became the Chief Chemist at Fullers Earth Union Ltd in Surrey.

In 1944 he moved to Glasgow and in 1958 moved to Pitlochry where he lived for the rest of his life.

His field work was varied and worldwide, including, field work in Iran (Kermanshah, Spain, Greece, and the US, and the United Kingdom.

In 1969 he founded the Robertson Resource Use Institute in Pitlochry. In 1970 he was elected a Fellow of the Royal Society of Edinburgh. His proposers were Patrick Dunbar Ritchie, Maclagan Gorrie, Robert C. Mackenzie, John Boyd-Orr and James Norman Davidson.

He died in Perth on 7 July 1999 aged 88.

His papers are held by Archive Services at the University of Dundee.

== Publications ==
- The Texture of An English Fullers Earth (1982)
- Fullers Earth: A History (Volturna Press, 1986)

== Family ==
In 1962 (aged 51) he married Anne-Lise, a Swiss woman. They had three children: Alison, Malcolm and Duncan.
