= Robbie Lakeman =

American esports player (born 1986)

Personal information
- Born: 1986 (age 39–40)
- Nationality: American

Career information
- Games: Donkey Kong; Super Pac-Man; Death Race; Stratovox

Robbie Lakeman is a competitive video game player who holds the world record for the arcade video games Donkey Kong (1981), Stratovox (1980), and Super Pac-Man (1982). He also formerly held the record score for the 1976 arcade game, Death Race.

After regularly livestreaming attempts at the Donkey Kong record, Lakeman first took the record by beating Hank Chien's 2012 world record of 1,138,600 points with a score of 1,141,800 on September 4, 2014. Lakeman subsequently exchanged the world record several times with Wes Copeland. He has broken the record eight times, including the world record score of 1,272,800 on an original Donkey Kong arcade cabinet on June 8, 2021.

== Controversy ==
Robbie Lakeman has made a number of controversial statements and accusations in recent years.

Lakeman has claimed numerous times that fellow competitive video game player Billy Mitchell has extorted him. In addition, Lakeman has publicly accused Mitchell of using his son's military connections and technology to take down personal enemies on U.S. soil for profit. This controversy was the subject of a Karl Jobst video which received nearly a million views. In response, Mitchell's legal team disputed the claims, stating that "the words and imputations are disgraceful, untrue, and are grossly defamatory." It is not clear what evidence, if any, supports these accusations.

Lakeman has also accused other members of the classic gaming community, including Billy Mitchell and Jace Hall, of being responsible for the deaths of other people. It is not clear what evidence, if any, supports these accusations.

In 2021, Lakeman submitted a new high score for the classic arcade game Donkey Kong to various leaderboards, including Twin Galaxies and Donkey Kong Forum. The score was accepted by Twin Galaxies and Guinness World Records. However, Donkey Kong Forum, a community-run leaderboard, did not accept the score because the forum's high score moderator, Jeremy Young, claimed that although Lakeman achieved his record legitimately, Lakeman's true intention was to gain an unfair advantage. According to Young, this was in violation of "the spirit of fair play." Despite widespread support for the score from the community, Young did not accept it, stating that "it's more important to me to do the right thing than it is to do the popular thing." Community members have disputed Young's decision, arguing that the use of hardware modifications did not give Lakeman an unfair advantage and that the score should be accepted.
