= Robert Robertson (chemist) =

- Sir Robert Robertson by Walter Stoneman © National Portrait Gallery, London
- Born: Robert Robertson; 17 April 1869; Cupar
- Died: 28 April 1949 (aged 80); London
- Occupation: Chemist
- Known for: Government Chemist
- Title: Sir
- Awards: Davy Medal (1944)

Sir Robert Robertson KBE FRS (17 April 1869 – 28 April 1949) was a British chemist who served as HM Government's Government Chemist between 1921 and 1936. He was the first person to establish that two types of natural diamond existed.

== Life ==
Robert Robertson was born in Cupar, Fife, the son of J. A. Robertson, a doctor of dental surgery, and Euphemia Russell. He was educated at Bell Baxter High School. Robertson won the Balgonie Gold Medal in 1885 as Dux of Madras Academy, Cupar, one of the two schools that amalgamated to form Bell Baxter in 1889. The School Honours Boards list the winners of that medal from its institution in 1861.

After leaving school he attended St Andrews University, where he graduated in both Arts and Science. The same institution would later award him an honorary LLD.

He was then appointed assistant in the laboratory of the city analyst in Glasgow. He later obtained the post of analyst in the Royal Gunpowder Factory at Waltham Abbey. His work as Director of Explosives Research during the Great War was recognised with the award of a KBE. He was also honoured with his election as a Fellow of the Royal Society in 1917. In 1921 he became Chief Government Chemist, a post held until his retirement in 1936. He came out of retirement during the Second World War to head the Armaments Research Department which had been relocated to Swansea University's laboratories.

In 1922 he was elected President of the Faraday Society, in 1924 President of the British Association for the Advancement of Science, and from 1925 to 1927 he was a council member of the Royal Society of London. In 1944, he was awarded the Royal Society's Davy Medal "[i]n recognition of his researches on explosives, analytical methods, the internal structure of diamond, and infra-red absorption spectra".

Sir Robert Robertson's archives are held by Archive Services, University of Dundee.

== Family ==
Robertson married Kathleen Stannus Stannus in 1903. They had two children: Jesanne Euphemia Stannus in 1909, and Robert Hugh Stannus in 1911. He was brother-in-law to Hugh Stannus Stannus.
