= View of the Domaine Saint-Joseph =

Painting by Paul Cézanne

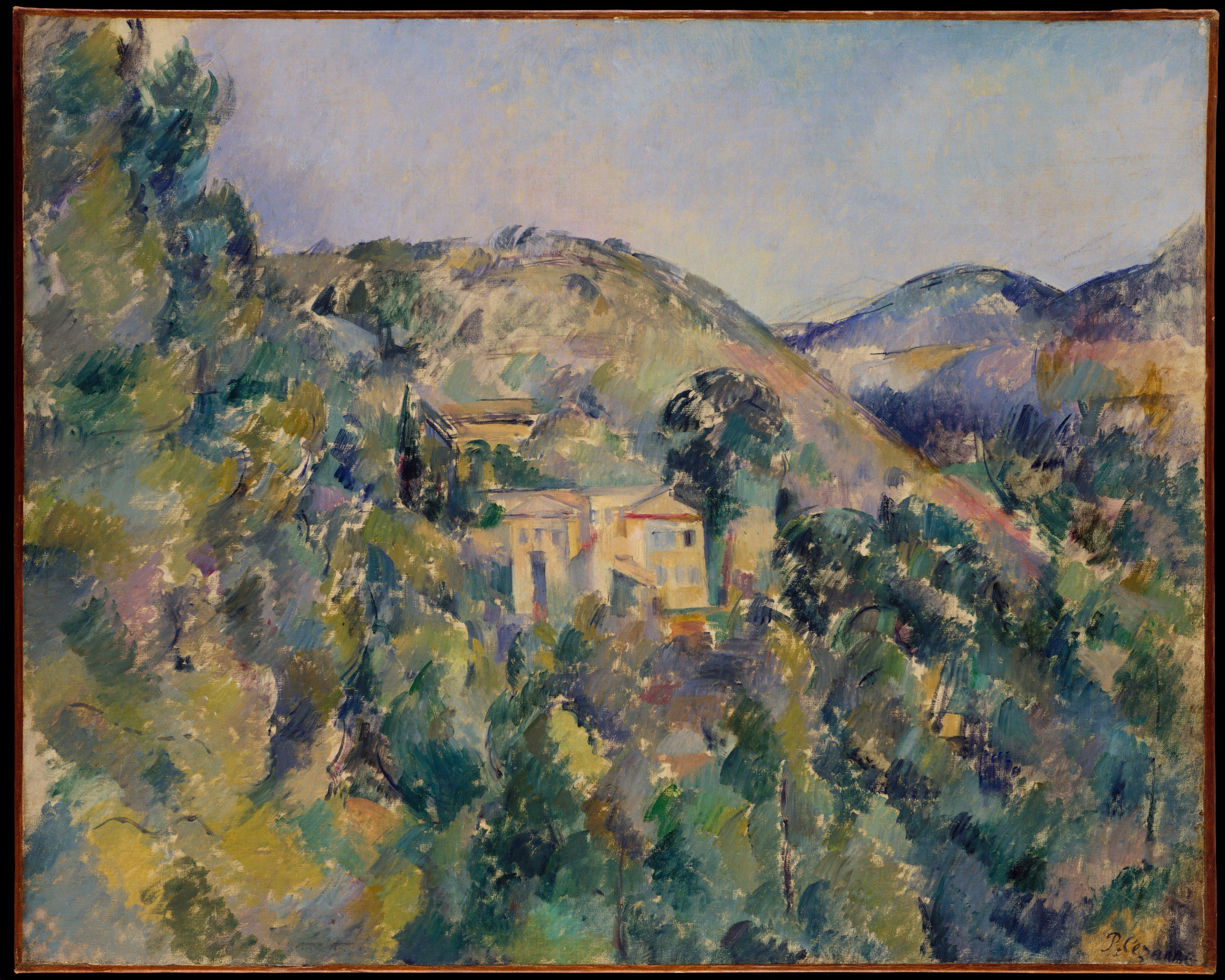
- Artist: Paul Cézanne
- Year: late 1880s
- Type: Oil paint on canvas
- Dimensions: 65.1 by 81.3 centimetres (25.6 in × 32.0 in)
- Location: Metropolitan Museum of Art, New York

View of the Domaine Saint-Joseph (French: Vue du Domaine Saint-Joseph) is an oil painting on canvas by French artist Paul Cézanne. Another name given to the work is La Colline des pauvres ("The Poorhouse on The Hill").

The painting depicts a hilly landscape that includes the so-called "Colline des Pauvres" (Hill of the Poor), revealing the Jesuit estate of Saint-Joseph, situated between Aix-en-Provence and the village of Le Tholonet, an area the artist had frequented since his youth. It is one of the few paintings he signed and the first to be acquired by an American museum.

Cézanne painted the work in the 1880s. It was exhibited in the Armory Show of 1913 and was purchased by the Metropolitan Museum of Art for the highest price paid by any gallery for a work at the Armory Show.

== See also ==
- List of paintings by Paul Cézanne
