= Ida Hall Roby =

Early American woman pharmacist

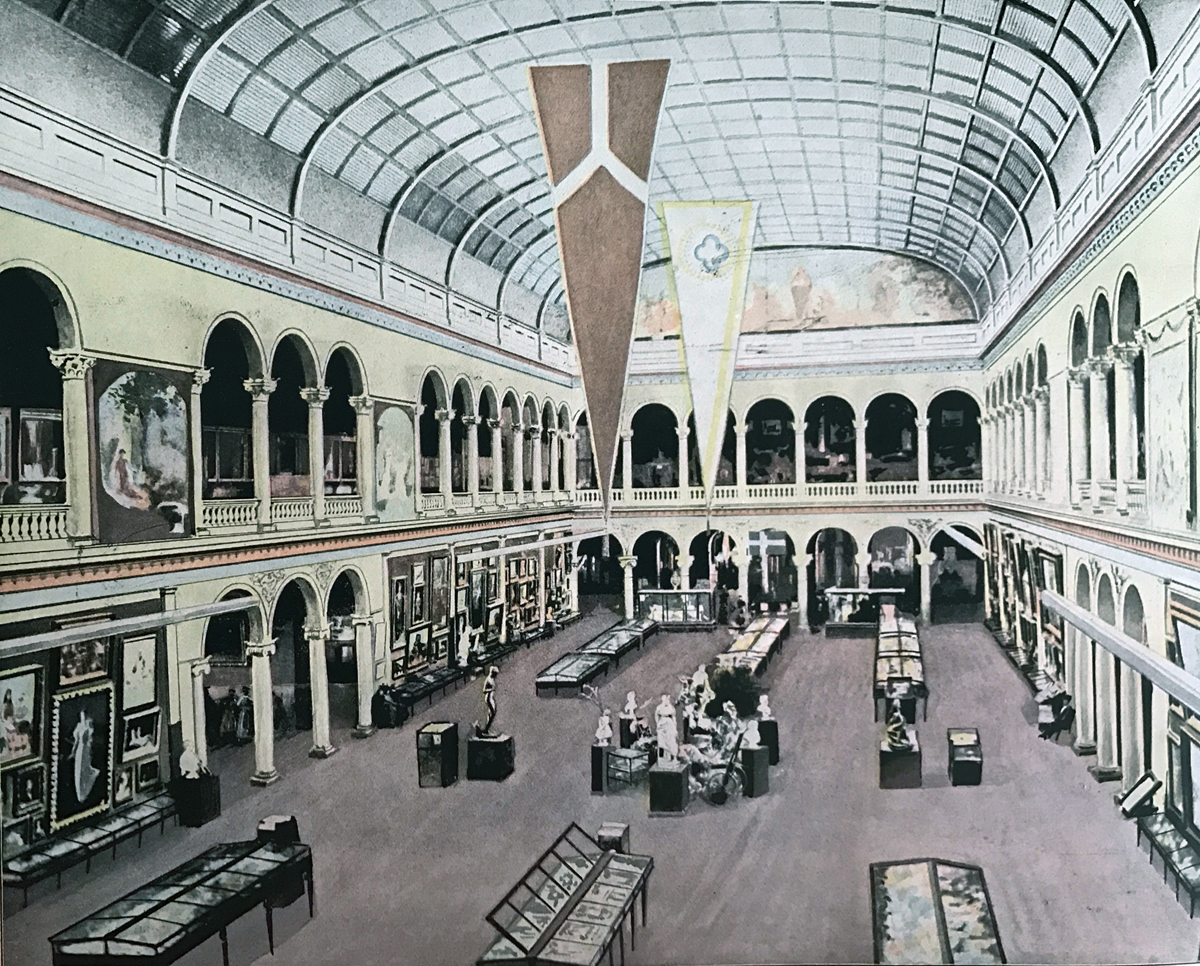
Woman's Building, World's Columbian Exposition, 1893

Ida Hall Roby (March 8, 1857 – March 2, 1899) was first woman to graduate from the Pharmaceutical Department of the Illinois College of Pharmacy, Northwestern University, and the only woman pharmacist in Illinois at the end of the 19th century.

== Early life and family ==
Ida Hall Roby was born in Fairport, New York, on March 8, 1857. Her parents moved to Michigan when she was a child, and she was educated mainly in that state. Her father was a noted educator, a man of brilliant intellect and sterling character. He was a professor in the high school in Battle Creek, Michigan, and served as superintendent of schools in Kalamazoo County, Michigan.

== Career ==
Ida Hall Roby's father died one year before his daughter graduated from the Illinois College of Pharmacy, part of Northwestern University, in Evanston, Illinois.

Roby supported herself working as a bookkeeper while attending college.

Having a fondness for chemistry, which was intensified by study and work in a drug house for several years, in 1887 Roby started a pharmacy in Chicago, at the corner of 31st Street and Forest Avenue. At the time she was the only woman pharmacist in Illinois. She attended the college on alternate days, and was the first woman to graduate from the pharmaceutical department of that institution in 1889. The first woman to graduate from the Chicago College of Pharmacy in 1880 was Celia Tirrel, who would later be the treasurer of the Woman's Pharmaceutical Association of which Roby was the president.

Roby won a unique reputation as a successful woman in a line of business that at the time was generally left to men to handle.

Roby managed the Chicago Women's Lecture Bureau.

Roby was the president of the Woman's Pharmaceutical Association of Illinois, founded in 1893 in concomitance with the World's Columbian Exposition. At the time there were 53 female pharmacists in Illinois and they wanted to be prepared for the arrivals in Chicago of many other women pharmacists who were attending the event. At the world's fair, Roby presided the woman's pharmacy, both dispensary and exhibition. The Woman's Pharmacy won the gold award from the Jury of Awards of the Exhibition.

Roby's pharmacist was the supplier for the Home of the Friendless, and for the Hahnemann Medical college and hospital. Her clerk was Viola Griswold, who beat out 85 men to win the medal for scholarship when she graduated from Northwestern University in 1892.

== Personal life ==
Ida Hall Roby moved to Chicago in 1881. She was married to Alfred H. Roby, a salesman, but they were separated and she was supporting alone their son.

In 1895 Roby employed George H. Roby as a clerk in her store, and in 1899 her name disappeared from the directory, while George was listed as the druggist.

Roby died of pneumonia on March 2, 1899. She is buried at Mountain Home Cemetery, Kalamazoo County (Plot: Lot H Sec 310 Grave 9).
