= Robbie Lunt =

English footballer

Personal information
- Full name: Robert John Lunt
- Date of birth: 11 December 1973 (age 52)
- Place of birth: Widnes, England
- Position: Winger

Youth career
- Wrexham

Senior career*
Years	Team	Apps	(Gls)
1990–1992	Wrexham	9	(0)
1992–1993	Hyde United	1	(0)
- * Club domestic league appearances and goals

Robert John Lunt (born 11 December 1973) is an English former professional footballer who played as a winger. He played in the English Football League for Wrexham, and also played non-league football for Hyde United.
