= Robbie Brown =

Northern Irish ice hockey player

- Born: 30 November 1990 (age 35) Belfast, NI
- Height: 5 ft 7 in (170 cm)
- Weight: 181 lb (82 kg; 12 st 13 lb)
- Position: Forward
- Shot: Right
- Played for: Solway Sharks; Belfast Giants; Wightlink Raiders; Basingstoke Bison; Invicta Dynamos; Peterborough Phantoms; Streatham Redskins
- Playing career: 2006–2015

Robbie Brown (born 30 November 1990) is a Northern Irish former professional ice hockey forward. He played in the Elite Ice Hockey League for his hometown Belfast Giants during the 2009–10 season and the 2013–14 season. He last played for the Streatham Redskins in the National Ice Hockey League who he joined towards the end of the 2014–15 season. Brown had re-signed with the Redskins for the 2015–16 season on the 22nd of June 2016, but two months later they announced that he had opted to remain in Belfast for a career outside of hockey which ultimately ended his playing career.
