= Robert Hart =

Robert, Robbie, Rob, Bob, or Bobby Hart may refer to:

== Sportspeople ==
- Bob Hart (umpire) (1879–1937), American baseball official
- Bobby Hart (American football) (born 1994), U.S. American football player
- Bobby Hart (wrestler) (1938–2001), American professional wrestler; see NWA Mid-America
- Rob Hart (born 1976), UK American football player
- Robbie Hart (born 1947), England association football referee
- Robbie Hart (cricketer) (born 1974), New Zealand cricketer
- Robert Hart (pole vaulter), winner of the 1947 NCAA DI outdoor pole vault championship

== Musicians ==
- Bob Hart (1900–1993), a.k.a. Al Trace, American musician
- Bob Hart (bassist), American bass player
- Bobby Hart (songwriter) (1939–2025), American songwriter
- Robert Hart (musician) (born 1958), English musician

== Politicians ==
- Robert Hart (politician) (1814–1894), New Zealand politician
- Sir Robert Hart, 1st Baronet (1835–1911), British diplomat in China

== Others ==
- Robbie E. Hart, American biologist
- Robbie Hart, a character in the 1998 film The Wedding Singer
- Robert Hart (horticulturist) (1913–2000), British gardener
- Rob Hart (author) (born 1982), American author
- Robert Alton (1902–1957), American dancer and choreographer, born Robert Alton Hart

== See also ==
- Robert Harte (disambiguation)
