= Robbie Robertson (disambiguation) =

Robbie Robertson (1943–2023) was a Canadian musician.

Robbie Robertson may also refer to:

- Robbie Robertson (album), self-titled album by the musician
- Robbie Robertson (character), fictional character
- Robbie Robertson, Miss Mississippi in 1966
- Robbie Robertson (visual effects artist), awarded the Academy Award for Best Visual Effects for Marooned

== See also ==
- Robert Robertson (disambiguation)
- Robert Roberson, Pentecostal pastor acquitted in the Wenatchee child abuse prosecutions
