= Robby Stein =

Vice President of Google Search

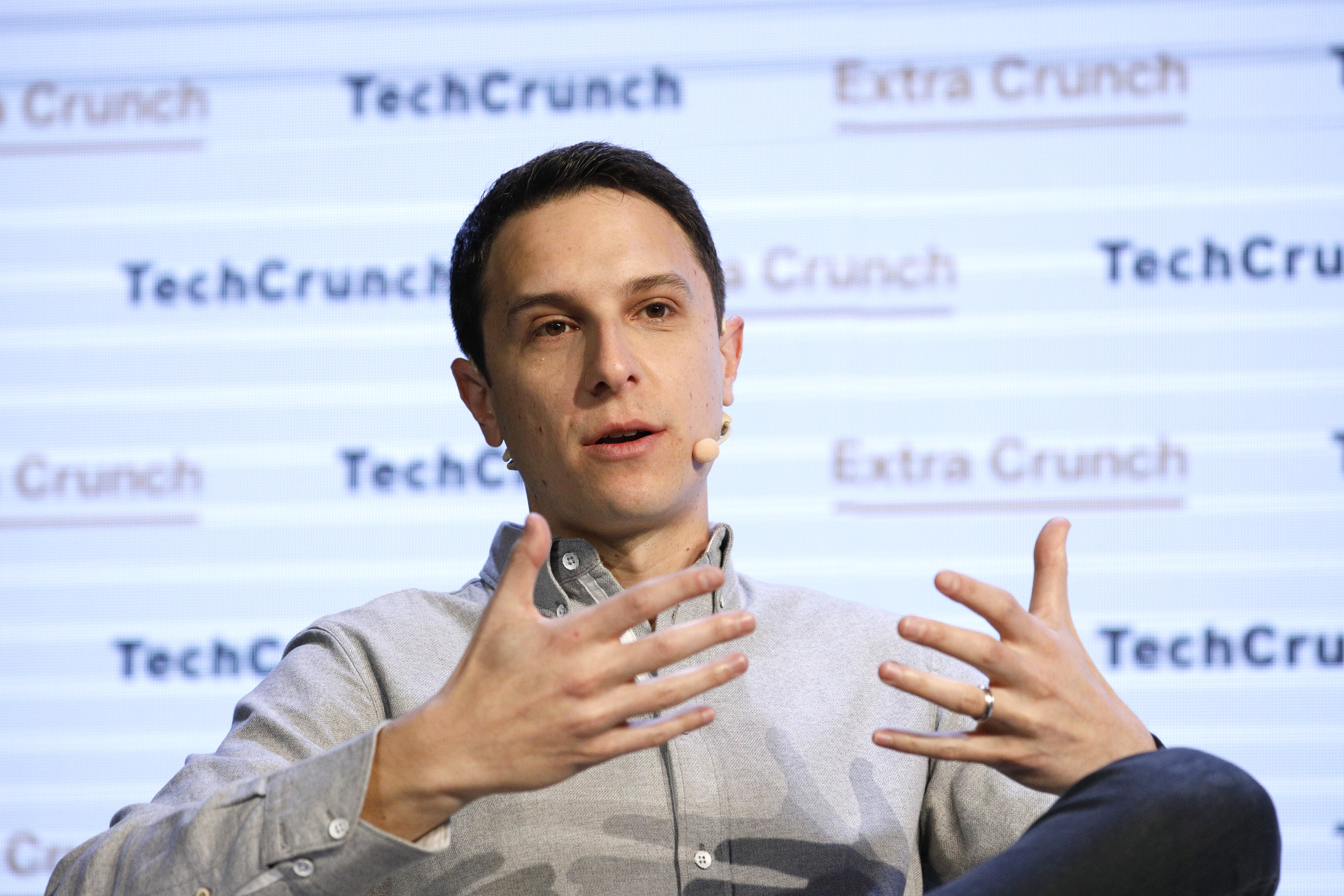
- Stein in 2019
- Born: Washington, D.C.
- Education: Northwestern University

Robby Stein is the vice president of product for Google Search. Previously, he was the head of product for Artifact, and from 2016 to 2021, Stein was a product executive at Instagram. He was also co-founder and CEO of Stamped, which was acquired by Yahoo in October 2012. It was Yahoo's first acquisition during the CEO tenure of Marissa Mayer, with whom Stein had worked at Google before co-founding Stamped, and he joined Yahoo following the acquisition.
