= Robbie Simpson (disambiguation) =

Robbie Simpson (born 1985) is an English footballer.

Robbie Simpson may also refer to:

- Robbie Simpson (rugby league) (born 1975), Australian rugby league player
- Robbie Simpson (runner) (born 1991), British long-distance runner

== See also ==
- Rob Simpson
- Robert Simpson (disambiguation)
