= Gabriel Roby =

French painter (1878–1917)

- Born: 1878
- Died: 1917 (aged 38–39)
- Occupation: Painter
- Relatives: Henry Caro-Delvaille (brother-in-law)

Gabriel Roby (1878–1917) was a French painter.

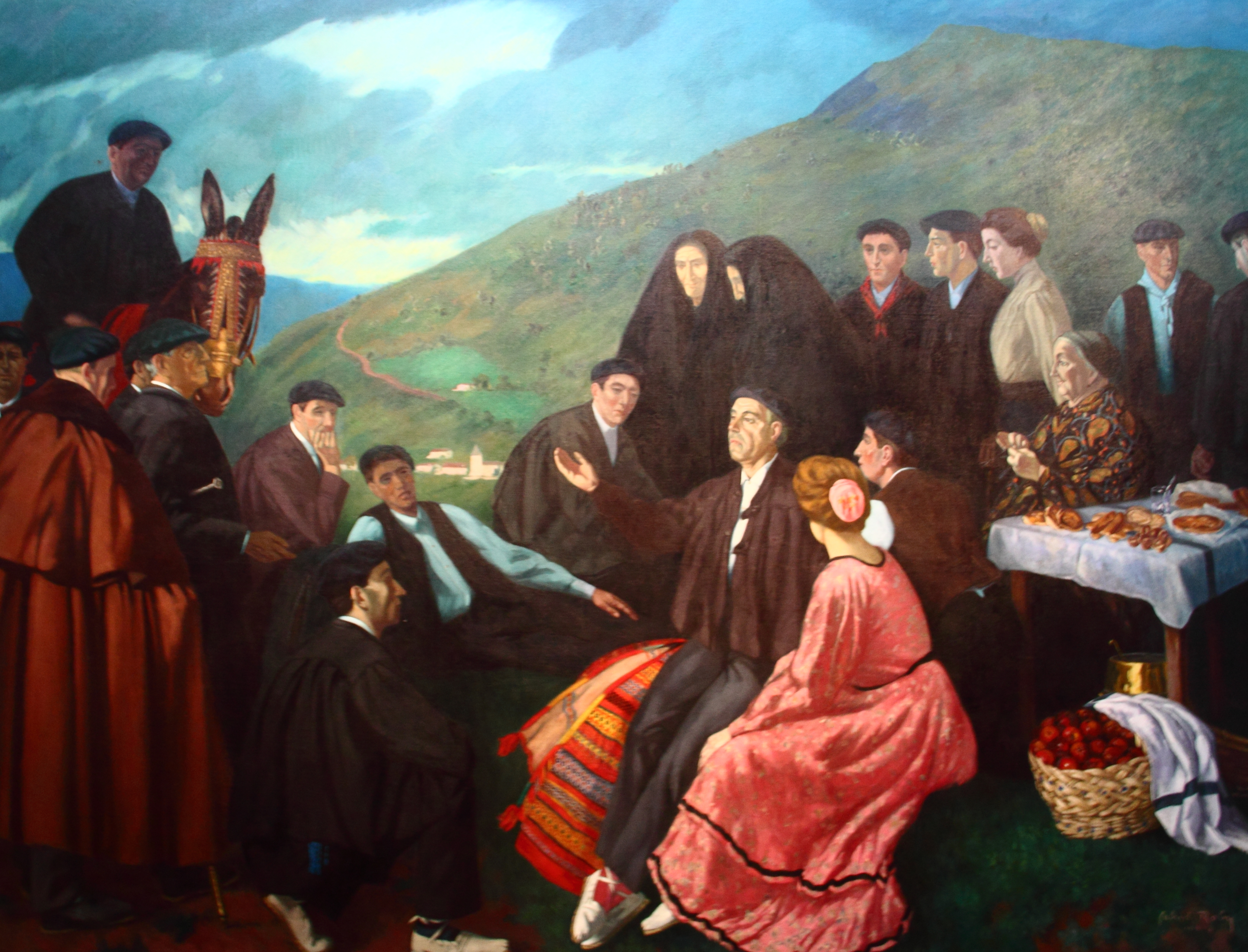
The improviser.
