= Robbie Hedderman =

Irish footballer

Personal information
- Full name: Robert Hedderman
- Date of birth: 4 April 1982 (age 44)
- Place of birth: Dublin, Ireland
- Height: 1.90 m (6 ft 3 in)
- Position: Defender

Youth career
- Tolka Rovers

Senior career*
Years	Team	Apps	(Gls)
2001–2003	Aberdeen		
2003	Cork City		
2003–2004	Derry City		
2004	→ Sligo Rovers (loan)		
2005–2006	Dublin City		
2006–2007	Waterford United	38	(1)
2008–2009	Shelbourne	61	(5)
2009–2010	Malahide United		
- * Club domestic league appearances and goals

Robbie Hedderman (born 4 April 1982 in Dublin, Ireland) is an Irish retired footballer who spent time in Scotland with Aberdeen when he was bought from Tolka Rovers for €100,000 as an 18-year-old.

In 2003, he returned to Ireland where he had spells with numerous clubs, before retiring in 2010.

He is the chief executive officer at club Shamrock Rovers, where he claimed the role in November 2025.

== Playing career ==
Hedderman, a former Irish youth international, began his senior career in Scotland with Aberdeen. Hedderman returned home to Irish football in 2003 and had a short-lived spell with Cork City. He joined Derry City for the 2003 season and spent 2 seasons at the Brandywell outfit while having a short loan spell with First Division side Sligo Rovers in 2004. Hedderman departed Derry City at the end of the 2004 season to join Dublin City. Hedderman was a vital figure for the Vikings during their successful 2005 First Division campaign as Dublin City secured promotion to the Premier Division after victory in a two-legged play-off against Shamrock Rovers. Hedderman's Dublin City career was cut short in July 2006 when Dublin City went out of existence due to severe financial difficulties.

It did not take Hedderman long to find a new club when he joined Waterford United for the remainder of the 2006 Premier Division campaign. Waterford and Hedderman were due to begin the 2007 season in the new FAI run First Division until Waterford received a reprieve in February 2007 as a result of Shelbourne's demotion to the First Division due to their financial difficulties. With a squad intended to play First Division football, Waterford played catch up throughout the 2007 season but were relegated back to the First Division after a two-legged play-off defeat to Finn Harps. Hedderman departed the freshly relegated Waterford after a season and a half at the RSC to join fellow First Division side Shelbourne on 29 November 2007 linking up with his former Dublin City manager Dermot Keely at the Tolka Park club. Hedderman made his Shelbourne debut in a scoreless draw against Dundalk at Tolka Park on 7 March 2008. He finished as a First Division runner-up with Shelbourne in both 2008 and 2009 as Shels just missed out of promotion in both seasons. Following the 2009 season, Hedderman parted company with Shelbourne as making 67 league and cup appearances for the club and scoring 5 goals. Hedderman joined Leinster Senior League side Malahide United in 2010.

His first step into management was as a player manager with LSL side Malahide United, but only stayed one season and left in summer 2010. He was appointed Ayrfield United's new manager in July 2010 with close friend Alan Keely as his assistant. At the time Ayrfield were an underachieving team in the Aul's Premier C division. In his first season, he guided them to runners up in both the league and the regency cup. Ayrfield were unlucky not to win the title as they had gone unbeaten in the league until March. His second season was just as successful, Ayrfield came runners up in Premier B and also came runners up in the Liddy cup to a strong Kilbarrack side. Ayrfield needed a last minute equalizer in their final game to secure promotion to the Aul's top division which sparked wild celebrations. In his third season which was Ayrfields first in the Aul's top flight they finished a very respectable 4th place. Hedderman resigned from his post with 3 games remaining to take over the Garda football team in July 2013. In his only season with the Gards he guided them to promotion to the LSL's third tier. He resigned in June 2014.

== Post-playing career ==
On 19 February 2019, it was announced that Hedderman would become the business development manager for the Aberdeen FC Community Trust. This role links with Aberdeen's work with schools and encouraging more school children to take up football.

On 24 November 2023, Hedderman was appointed to the role of Commercial Director for Aberdeen Football Club.

On 14 November 2025, Hedderman was appointed to the role of chief executive officer of Shamrock Rovers.
