= Robbie Steinhouse =

British author and entrepreneur (born 1961)

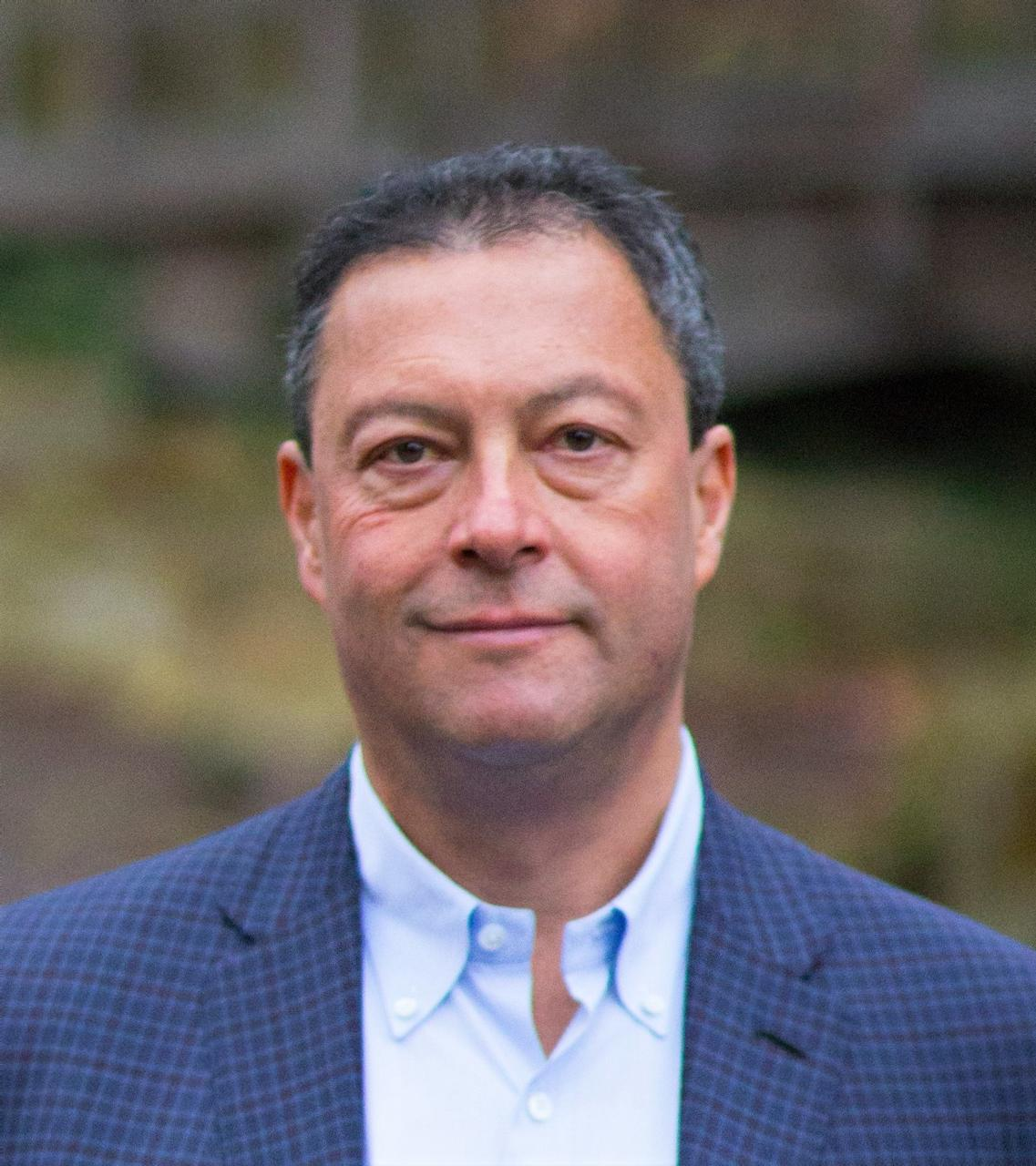
- Steinhouse in 2025
- Born: December 8, 1961 (age 64); London, United Kingdom
- Education: Middlesex University
- Occupations: Author, entrepreneur
- Known for: Business coaching and author of business guides
- Spouse: Anna Steinhouse-Kandelaki

Robbie Steinhouse (born December 8, 1961) is a British author, business coach, former businessman and entrepreneur. For the past 23 years has been focused on delivering coaching and personal development training. He is an International Coaching Federation certified coach and works with individuals and organizations around the world.

== Early life and education ==
Robbie Steinhouse was born on December 8, 1961 in London. Initially he pursued a career in business. He graduated from Middlesex University with a Bachelor of Science (BSc) in Mathematics for Business in 1984. Robbie is a graduate of the Curtis Brown Creative Writing Fiction course and an ACC ICF certified coach.

== Career ==
Ever since leaving the formal education space, Steinhouse has been an entrepreneur. Starting in the late 1980's, Steinhouse built and ran businesses in recruitment, property and insurance. He was introduced to coaching and personal development in the early 2000s. Steinhouse describes their combination as an excellent method in helping him navigate his growing businesses. This interest subsequently led him to give up his executive role and focus entirely on coaching and training in 2002.

He is a guest lecturer at University College London and Ecole Polytechnique Paris. Robbie is a regular media commentator, podcast and radio guest appearing on BBC Radio, in The Guardian, Sunday Times and other media around the world.

== Publishing ==
In addition to his entrepreneurial and coaching career Steinhouse is also an author. He was always an avid reader. Growing up in Hampstead, North London Steinhouse was inspired and encouraged by his family's literary circle (which included Al Alvarez, Peter Elstob and Len Deighton) to pursue his passion for storytelling. He has published five books on leadership and using coaching in professional environments. He has also published one work of fiction called the Process.

== Works ==
- Think Like an Entrepreneur, 2008 Pearson Education
- Brilliant Decision Making, 2010 Pearson Education
- How to Coach with NLP, 2010 Pearson Education
- Making Effective Decisions, 2013 Pearson Education
- Mindful Business Leadership, 2017
- The Process, 2025 Troubadour

== Personal life ==
Steinhouse lives with his wife Georgian-British painter Anna Steinhouse-Kandelaki in London. He maintains strong ties to his wife's country of birth. They have three grown up children.
