= Robbie Robinson =

Robbie or Robby Robinson may refer to:

- Robbie Dale, DJ on Radio Caroline and Radio Veronica during the 1960s and 1970s
- Robbie Robinson (footballer) (1879–c. 1951), English footballer of the early 1900s
- Robbie Robinson (soccer) (born 1998), American soccer player
- Robby Robinson (musician), keyboardist and musical director for The Four Seasons
- Robbie Robinson (basketball) (born 1959), American basketball referee
- Robbie Robinson (rugby union) (born 1989), New Zealand rugby union player
- Robby Robinson (bodybuilder) (born 1946), American former bodybuilder
- Wilbert Robinson (1863–1934), nicknamed Uncle Robbie, American baseball player
- Henry W. Robinson (1893–?), American football player for the Auburn Tigers.
- W. M. Robinson (1902–1982), American football player for the Florida Gators.

== See also ==
- Robert Robinson (disambiguation)
- Bobby Robinson (disambiguation)
