= Bobby Robinson (footballer, born 1921) =

English footballer (died 1975)

Personal information
- Full name: Robert Robinson
- Date of birth: 23 June 1921
- Place of birth: Ashington, England
- Date of death: 1975 (aged 53–54)
- Position: Goalkeeper

Senior career*
Years	Team	Apps	(Gls)
1945–1946	Burnley	0	(0)
1946–1947	Newbiggin		
1947–1952	Sunderland	31	(0)
1952–1953	Newcastle United	2	(0)
- * Club domestic league appearances and goals

Robert Robinson (23 June 1921 – 1975) was an English professional footballer who played as a goalkeeper for Sunderland.
