= Jean-Baptiste Robie =

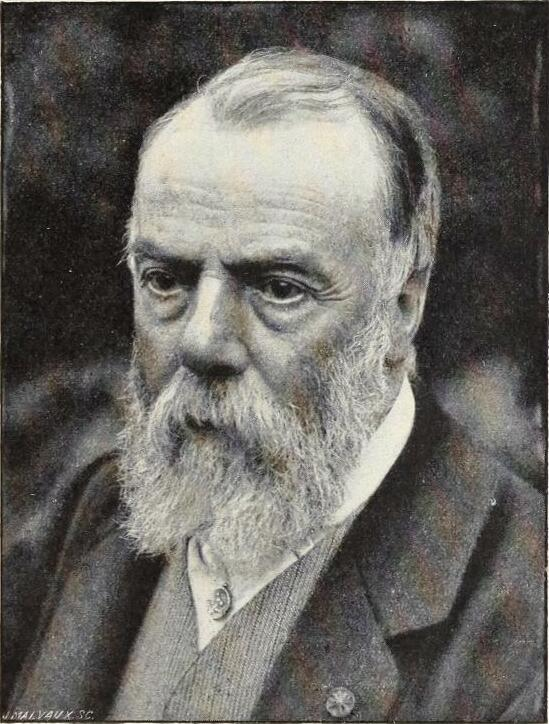
- Portrait of Robie, c. 1894
- Born: Jean-Baptiste Robie; 1821; Brussels, Belgium
- Died: 1910 (aged 88–89) n/a
- Occupation: Painter

Jean-Baptiste Robie or Jean Robie (1821–1910) was a Belgian painter who specialised in still lifes with flowers and fruit. He later painted seascapes, landscapes and Oriental scenes based on his travels in the Middle East, India and Ceylon. He was also a writer who wrote about his travels in the East, an autobiographical essay and art theoretical works.

== Life ==
He was born in Brussels, the son of a smith, and was initially self-taught. With the encouragement of his friend the artist Théodore Fourmois he later began studying at the Académie Royale des Beaux-Arts in Brussels with Balthazar-François Tasson (later Tasson-Snel) and exhibited at the Brussels Salon from 1843 to 1875, as well as at the Paris Salon and elsewhere.

He also wrote many travel books based on his extensive travels as far as India.
