= Robbie Jones =

Robbie Jones may refer to:

- Robbie Jones (American football) (born 1959), former NFL linebacker
- Robbie Jones (actor) (born 1977), American actor

== See also ==
- Robert Jones (disambiguation)
