= Hank Chien =

Taiwanese electronic sports player

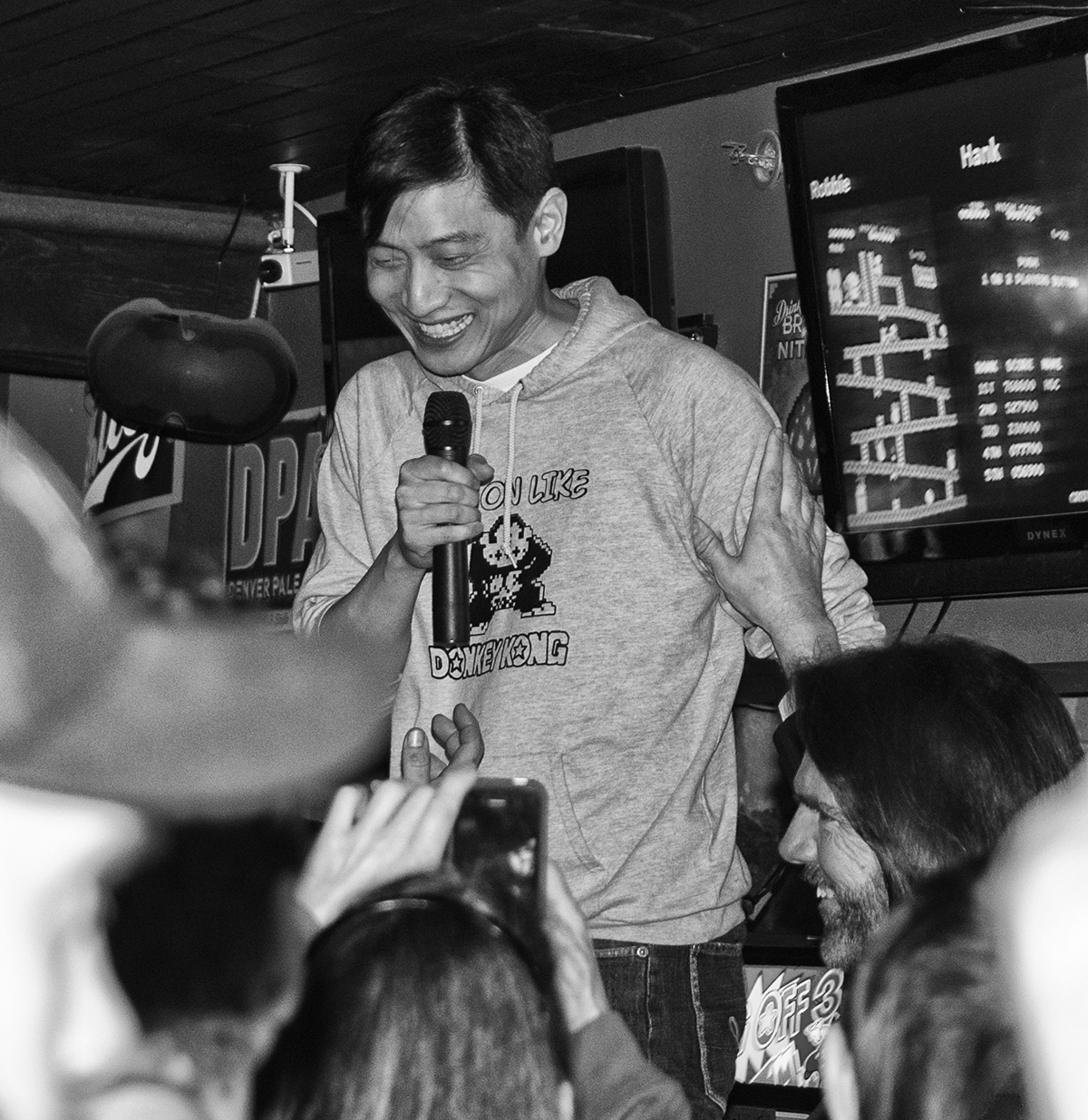
- Chien at the Kong-Off 3 tournament in Denver, Colorado, 2013
- Born: August 4, 1974 (age 52); Taiwan
- Citizenship: American
- Education: Harvard University; Mount Sinai School of Medicine

Hank Chien (Chinese: 簡碩宏; pinyin: Jiǎn Shuòhóng; born August 4, 1974) is a Taiwanese-American former world record holder and two-time "Kong-Off" Champion of the video game Donkey Kong. As of January 2016, his personal best sits at 1,138,600. Chien won the first Kong-Off, a Donkey Kong competition which occurred on March 19–20, 2011. The competition featured Steve Wiebe, Billy Mitchell and eight other competitors. Chien won with a score of 994,400.

Hank Chien was born in Taiwan and moved to the U.S. with his family at the age of two. He works as a plastic surgeon in Queens. Chien grew up in Forest Hills, New York City. He attended and graduated from Stuyvesant High School, where he participated in the National Mathematics Competitions, placing 12th, and was also a member of the USA Mathematical Olympiad team. He later went on to attend and graduate from Harvard University and Mount Sinai Medical School.

The documentary Doctor Kong: Cutting Up the Competition follows his first attempt to break the world record.
