= Robbie Howard =

American entertainer

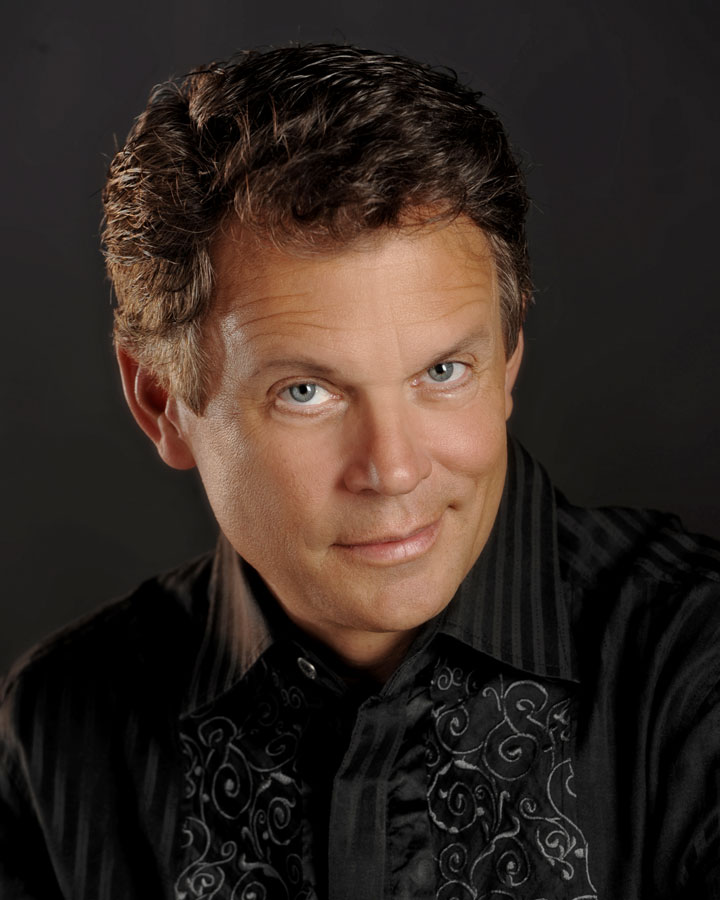
- Born: Glendale, California
- Occupations: Entertainer, Singer, Impersonator
- Website: http://www.RobbieHoward.com

Robbie Howard is an American born entertainer, singer, impersonator and comedian who resides in Las Vegas, Nevada where he has directed, produced and starred in long-running shows on the Las Vegas Strip with Hurray America (1993-1999) and Stars of the Strip (1999-2005) and The Rat Pack is Back (2006-2014).

== Biography ==
Howard began his stage career with Broadway Musicals appearing at performing art centers and dinner theaters in Southern California. Through the 1980s Howard appeared in Perfect Strangers, Growing Pains, and filmed dozens of commercials, both national and regional. In 1983, he began developing a night club act with music, comedy and impersonations which opened the door for a Las Vegas residency.

Howard relocated to Las Vegas in 1991 after performing over 10,000 Live shows in Southern California. Howard Headlined his own production of Hurray America at the [[. ]] November 1993 through November of 1999. In December of 1999, Howard moved his Westward Ho Hotel and Casino to the Lady Luck Hotel and renamed the show Stars of the Strip until his return to the Westward Ho in 2004. In 2005, the Westward Ho, like many Las Vegas resorts, closed to make room for bigger resorts. In an article of the Las Vegas Sun, Howard talked about the rapid pace in which hotels open and close in Las Vegas and how it affects the entertainers at those venues. Howard said he would like to have a deal with a major casino, but he also said it wasn't necessary because of the lucrative career he had performing corporate gigs.

In 2006, Howard joined the cast of The Rat Pack is Back playing both the Frank Sinatra and Dean Martin roles and eventually became both writer and director. Although he's best known for performing as Frank Sinatra, Howard also impersonates Johnny Carson, Tom Jones, Dean Martin, Wayne Newton, George Jones, Joe Cocker, Bob Dylan, Eric Clapton, Barry Manilow, Redd Foxx, Jim Morrison and others.

During the years that followed, Howard performed throughout Australia and around the world for corporate clients, on cruise ships and at major public venues, but still called Las Vegas home.

In early 2019, Howard starred in the production of An Evening with Frank Sinatra and 30 Close Friends at Seven Angels Theatre in Waterbury, CT and is a regular cast member of Legends in Concert where he has performed as both Frank Sinatra and Dean Martin in theaters in Las Vegas, Foxwoods, Myrtle Beach and Branson. Howard additionally tours with Barbra Streisand impersonator Sharon Owens in their own production of Sinatra and Streisand. Howard now performs around the country in Performing Art Centers, Theater, Casinos, and Holland America Cruise Lines
