= Robey =

Robey is a surname. Notable people with the surname include:

- Don Robey (1903–1975), American record executive
- George Robey (1869–1954), English music hall comedian
- James N. Robey (born 1941), American politician
- Louise Robey (born 1960), British/French-Canadian writer/illustrator/singer and actress
- Nickell Robey (born 1992), American football cornerback
- Ralph Mayer Robey (1809–1864), Australian politician and businessman
- Simon Robey (born 1960), British investment banker
- Washington Robey (~1799–1841), American slave trader

== See also ==
- Robey & Co, English engineering company
- Damen (CTA Brown Line) or Damen (CTA Blue Line), stations on the Chicago 'L' that were originally named "Robey" because of the original name of the street on which they are located
- Roby (disambiguation)
