= Doris Self =

American video game competitor (1925–2006)

Self in 2005

Doris Self (September 18, 1925 – October 3, 2006) was an American video game competitor who gained recognition in 1984 as "oldest competitive videogamer", at the age of 58. The documentary film The King of Kong: A Fistful of Quarters detailed Self's quest to recover her standing as the "oldest champion" from John Lawton, the 72-year-old co-founder of the Funspot Family Fun Center in Weirs Beach, New Hampshire, who had captured the world title on Depthcharge.

== Career ==
On July 1, 1984, Doris Self made video game history when, at the age of 58, she gained recognition as the "world's oldest video game champion". As a competitor on Q*bert at Twin Galaxies' 1984 Video Game Masters Tournament, Self scored a world record mark of 1,112,300 points on Twin Galaxies' Tournament Settings (TGTS) – the most difficult settings that allow for only five men in the game.

In 2005, Self traveled to London to continue her quest to regain the Q*bert World Record. She was one of the featured stars at the Classic Gaming Expo-UK, held Saturday, August 13, 2005, in Croydon, United Kingdom. As an honorary member of the U.S. National Video Game Team, she was part of a contingent of video gamers who traveled to Paris, France, on Napoleon's birthday (August 15, 2005) to hand-deliver an 8-foot-tall (2.4 m) proclamation signed by hundreds of British players that challenged Paris to a London vs. Paris video game championship.

During the weekend of April 6 to April 9, 2006, Self faced-off against Kelly Tharp, of Sellersburg, Indiana, in a highly publicized Q*bert contest, held at Apollo Amusements in Pompano Beach, Florida. Titled "The King vs The Queen Q*bert Smackdown," the event was filmed as part of the King of Kong documentary.

Self recorded a world record score on the game Q*bert on July 1, 1984, at the age of 58. She was subsequently recognized as the "oldest competitive videogamer" by the Guinness World Records.

== Personal life ==
Self's Q*bert career was preceded by her career as a flight attendant. At the age of 19, she was among the first female flight attendants at Eastern Air Lines, graduating in 1945 as a member of Eastern Air Lines’ first class of airline stewardesses. And, in 1954, while working with legendary air ace Eddie Rickenbacker, she co-organized "The Silver Liners", the first association for ex-stewardesses. Today, one of the DC-3s she used to fly on in the 1940s is hanging from the ceiling of the National Air and Space Museum in Washington, D.C.

Self had been practicing and preparing for her next world record attempt on Q*bert when she died from injuries suffered in an automobile accident in Plantation, Florida, on October 3, 2006.
