= International Video Game Hall of Fame =

Museum in Iowa, US

- Established: July 2010
- Location: Ottumwa, Iowa
- Coordinates: 41.0511°N 92.4090°W
- Website: www.ivghof.info

The International Video Game Hall of Fame (IVGHoF) is a planned museum to be operated in Ottumwa, Iowa, United States.

Ottumwa considers itself as the "Video Game Capital of the World" as the city was home to the Twin Galaxies arcade which became the epicenter for numerous competitions in arcade games. The museum's organization is operated as a 501(c)(3) non-profit by Ottumwa business leaders and other residents, designed to recognize "the champions, industries, and professionals" of the video game industry. The museum has not been constructed. The IVGHoF took a hiatus on inducting members into its Hall of Fame after 2022, and resumed in 2025.

== History ==
The idea of the museum was conceived around 2009. The city laid claim that they were the Video Game Capital of the World in 1982, following the recognition that Twin Galaxies had received for being the authoritative source for high scores in arcade games, a point that had not been challenged since. Around 2009, community leaders started speculating on the possibility of a museum, recognizing that previous efforts to establish a United States video game museum had all failed and that this was potentially a way to capitalize on the city's claim to fame. Leaders recognized that since 1982, the video game industry had significantly changed, with arcade games having waned in favor of consoles and computers, but felt they could still be a proper home to this museum due to the town's history as Cooperstown, New York serves for the National Baseball Hall of Fame and Museum. The city leaders also saw the opportunity to help the financially struggling city to bring in more revenues from tourism to the primarily farming community.

The city's council and chamber of commerce authorized a steering committee to organize and plan out the museum. The museum's organizers aimed to collect donations to build a modern facility, estimated to cost between $30 million and $50 million, with interactive displays to celebrate its inductees, and to acquire at least one working version of each of the estimated 100,000 coin-operated and home video game systems that have been produced to date. Their initial goal was to start construction within five years from its onset.

The museum inducted its first class during its multiday "Big Bang 2010" event on August 7, 2010. Inducted into the Hall of Fame during this initial ceremony included Nintendo's Shigeru Miyamoto, Namco's Masaya Nakamura, home video game system pioneers Ralph H. Baer and Nolan Bushnell, game designer Steve Ritchie, members of the original Xbox design team including Seamus Blackley, and several arcade game high-score champions including Steve Wiebe and Billy Mitchell. The event also honored Pac-Man on the 30th anniversary of the arcade game's release through induction into the Hall of Fame. The initial events drew in at least 3,500 visitors to the town. In subsequent years, due to low donations, the IVGHoF has scaled back these events, still holding ceremonies for honoring inductees, as to be able to better met their target goals.

In 2016, the IVGHoF and the town established the "Video Game Walk of Fame" along the town's main street, believed to be the first of its kind. While the IVGHoF itself focuses more on the people and organizations of the video game industry, the Video Game Walk of Fame was designed to commemorate key video games. In its inaugural year, the IVGHoF selected Pac-Man for the first "star" on this, and put into display on August 7, 2016, alongside the events to induct new members into the Hall of Fame.

== Inductees ==
The IVGHoF selects inductees from both the industry and from players, as well as select video games. Selections are made first through an open nomination process, public input to narrow down the electees, and then voting among a set of video game journalists, executives, and gamers for final inductees.

=== Developers and industry leaders ===
Year	Name	Description
2010	Kevin Bachus	Member of the Xbox design team
2010	Ralph H. Baer	"Father of Video Games", inventor of the first home video game console
2010	Otto Berkes	Member of the Xbox design team
2010	Seamus Blackley	Member of the Xbox design team
2010	Nolan Bushnell	Founder of Atari
2021	John Carmack	Co-founder of id Software
2020	Mark Cerny	American video game designer, programmer, producer and entertainment executive
2019	Brian Colin	Developer of Rampage and Arch Rivals
2017	Warren Davis	Developer of Q*bert
2019	Richard Garriott	"Lord British", and developer of the Ultima series
2010	Ted Hase	Member of the Xbox design team
2025	Trip Hawkins	Founder of Electronic Arts
2016	Satoru Iwata	Former president of Nintendo
2015	Eugene Jarvis	Developer of Defender and Robotron: 2084
2022	Tom Kalinske	Former president and CEO of Sega of America
2016	Hideo Kojima	Developer of the Metal Gear series
2022	Sid Meier	Programmer, designer, and producer of Civilization
2010	Shigeru Miyamoto	Developer of Donkey Kong
2010	Masaya Nakamura	Founder of Namco
2017	Howard Phillips	Spokesperson for Nintendo of America
2010	Steve Ritchie	Pinball game designer
2019	Bonnie Ross	Head of 343 Industries, the studio managing the Halo franchise
2015	Gary Stern	President of Stern Electronics and Stern Pinball
2025	Tim Sweeney	Founder of Epic Games
2025	Satoshi Tajiri	Creator of Pokémon and co-founder of Game Freak
2021	Tommy Tallarico	Video game composer and founder of Tommy Tallarico Studios
2020	Will Wright	Original designer for The Sims

=== Competitive gamers ===
Year	Name	Description
2015	Thor Aackerlund	Competitive Gamer
2010	Eric Akeson	Competitive Gamer
2017	Chris Ayra	90's eSports Competitor
2015	Tim Balderramos	Competitive Gamer
2010	Rob Barrett	Competitive Gamer
2021	Phil Britt	Golden Age Gamer
2025	Tim Collum	Golden Age Gamer
2010	Dennis Fong	Competitive Gamer
2022	Jack Gale	Golden Age Gamer
2015	Eric Ginner	Competitive Gamer
2015	Katherine "Mystik" Gunn	Competitive Gamer
2010	Ike Hall	Competitive Gamer
2015	Steve Harris	Competitive Gamer
2019	Ryan Hart	1990's Gamer
2019	Donald Hayes	2000's Gamer
2019	Pete Hahn	2000's Gamer
2016	Isaiah "TriForce" Johnson	2000's eSports Competitor
2025	Jang "Moon" Jae-ho	Competitive Gamer
2015	Josh Jones	Competitive Gamer
2017	Michael Klug	Golden Age Gamer
2010	Andrew Laidlaw	Competitive Gamer
2010	John McAllister	Competitive Gamer
2016	Lonnie McDonald	Competitive Gamer
2015	Tim McVey	Competitive Gamer
2021	Robin Mihara	1990's Gamer
2010	Billy Mitchell	Competitive Gamer
2020	Donn Nauert	Golden Age Gamer
2019	David Palmer	Golden Age Gamer
2019	Jeff Peters	Golden Age Gamer
2010	Perry Rodgers	Competitive Gamer
2010	Todd Rogers	Competitive Gamer
2010	Scott Safran	Competitive Gamer
2020	Tomo Ohira	90's Gamer
2016	Chris Tang	90's eSports Competitor
2025	Michael Tang	90's eSports Competitor
2020	Hajime “Tokido” Taniguchi	2000's Gamer
2021	Daigo "The Beast" Umehara	2000's Gamer
2010	Johnathan "Fatal1ty" Wendel	Competitive Gamer
2022	Robert Whiteman	1990's Gamer
2010	Steve Wiebe	Competitive Gamer
2022	Lim "BoxeR" Yo-hwan	2000's Gamer
2010	Phil Younger	Competitive Gamer

=== Games ===
Year	Name	Description
2019	Assassin's Creed series	2000's Era Game
2025	Black Knight	Digital Era Pinball
2022	Centipede	Golden Age Game
2019	Computer Space	Golden Age Game
2015	Defender	Legendary Arcade Game
2019	Doom	90's Era Game
2017	Donkey Kong	Golden Arcade Game
2019	Fortnite	2000's Era Game
2019	Galaga	Golden Age Game
2025	Half-Life	90's Era Game
2017	Halo	2000's Era Game
2025	Humpty Dumpty	EM Era Pinball
2021	Joust	Golden Age Game
2022	League of Legends	2000's Era Game
2016	The Legend of Zelda: A Link to the Past	90's Era Game
2017	The Legend of Zelda: Breath of the Wild	Modern Age Game
2025	Medieval Madness	Modern Era Pinball
2016	Minecraft	Current Era Game
2021	Mortal Kombat	1990's Era Game
2020	Warcraft	90's Era Game
2019	Ms. Pac-Man	Golden Age Game
2010	Pac-Man	Legendary Arcade Game
2017	Sonic the Hedgehog	90's Era Game
2020	Pong	Golden Age Game
2020	Final Fantasy franchise	90's Era Game
2020	Half-Life 2	2000's Era Game
2020	Guitar Hero	2000's Era Game
2025	The Sims	2000's Era Game
2025	Space Invaders	Golden Age Game
2022	StarCraft	1990's Era Game
2019	Street Fighter series	90's Era Game
2019	Super Mario 64	90's Era Game
2016	Super Mario Bros.	Golden Age Game
2019	Super Smash Bros. Melee	2000's Era Game
2019	Tetris	Golden Age Game
2021	Wii Sports	2000's Era Game
2016	World of Warcraft	2000's Era Game

=== Community Action Award ===
Year	Name	Description
2016	Patrick O'Malley	Community Action Award
2017	Extra Life	Fundraising organization
2019	Doc Mack	Founder of Galloping Ghost, arcade game collection
2019	Video Game Palooza	Video game STEM-based charity
2020	Keisha Howard	Founder of Sugar Gamers
2025	Games Done Quick	Annual charity speedrunning event

=== Walter Day Lifetime Achievement Award ===
Year	Name	Description
2015	David Bishop	Programmer and vice-president of Namco America
2017	David Crane	Programmer and co-founder of Activision
2019	Reggie Fils-Aimé	President of Nintendo of America
2022	Jerry Lawson	Known for his work in designing the Fairchild Channel F and the ROM cartridge
2020	Gabe Newell	Co-founder of the video game developer Valve
2021	Gary Stern	Co-founder, chairman and owner of Stern Electronics
2016	Steve Wozniak	Co-founder of Apple Inc.
2025	Trip Hawkins	Founder of Electronic Arts
