= Todd Rogers (gamer) =

American video game player

Todd Rogers (born 1964 or 1967 in Illinois) is an American video game player who has been described as one of the first professional video game players. He claimed to be recognized by video game publisher Activision for having achieved numerous record-setting high scores, but many of his records were later disputed for a lack of verifying evidence or found to be impossible to achieve.

In January 2018, the Twin Galaxies record database removed all of his scores from their leaderboards and banned him permanently, and Guinness World Records also stripped his records.

== Video gaming career ==
According to Rogers, among the first video games he ever played were Pong and the Datsun 280 Zzzap! arcade game.

His first official records were awarded for the Activision game Dragster on the Atari 2600 home video game console. At the time, such scores were verified by Polaroid photographs of the running screen. The publisher advertised the current high score in its official newsletter and sent a World Class Dragster Club patch and an official certificate to the current record holder. Rogers was awarded the record three times: On December 1st, 1980 for a 5.64 second run (certificate number 157), on January 14, 1982 for a 5.57 second run (certificate number 2786) and a second time in 1982 for a 5.51 second run (certificate number 3476), allegedly performed live in front of an audience at the Consumer Electronics Show in Chicago. Rogers claims to have performed the 5.51 second run a second time at an event in Detroit.

Due to his achievements, Activision started flying Rogers to trade shows to promote their titles. During these trips he would allegedly often beat the game designers at their own games. Later on Rogers was also booked by companies like Nintendo and Sega to promote their new games at trade shows. In 1986 he was invited to be part of the U.S. National Video Game Team. He also claims to have illustrated for the Dungeons & Dragons fantasy role-playing games during the mid-1980s. Over the following decades, Rogers accumulated more than 1,700 video game records on more than 20 different gaming systems. In 2008 he joined the Empire Arcadia Esports team as a mentor and consultant.

Rogers appeared as himself in several films about competitive video gaming, including Chasing Ghosts: Beyond the Arcade, The King of Kong: A Fistful of Dollars, The Perfect Fraudman and The King Of Arcades.

In 2010, Rogers was inducted into the International Video Game Hall of Fame in Ottumwa, Iowa. In 2012, he received a Guinness World Record for the longest-standing video game score record, for his 1982 Dragster record.

As of 2014, Rogers worked for ACW Underground, an independent wrestling sports promotion company. He lives in Brooksville, Florida.

== Disputed records ==
In the year 2000, Twin Galaxies started publishing its collection of video game records on its website. Widespread access to the Internet, emulators and digital copies of old game media had also renewed interest in historical video games and given rise to online speedrunning communities. As a result, several of Rogers's records quickly came under scrutiny.

In 2002, Robert Mruczek, then chief referee at Twin Galaxies, officially rescinded Rogers's record time in the 1982 Barnstorming video game after other players pointed out that his time of 32.04 seconds did not appear to be possible, even when the game had been hacked to remove all obstacles. Upon further investigation, Twin Galaxies referees were unable to find independent verification for Rogers' submitted time, having relied on information provided by Activision.

In the following years, other scores were individually disputed or removed as well, including:

- Centipede for the Atari 5200, for which he claimed a score of exactly 65,000,000, with the next-best-recorded score being only 58,078
- Beamrider for the Atari 5200, for which he claimed a score of 999,999, with the next-best-recorded score being only 3,948
- Wabbit, where he claimed a score of 1,698 despite the game normally ending when the player reaches 1,300 points and the score only increasing in increments of 5
- Fathom, where, based upon other players' verified scores and playtimes, his claimed record would have theoretically taken over 325 hours (13.5 days) of uninterrupted play to achieve
- Slot Machine for the Atari 2600, where his claimed $9,999 high score was determined to be impossible to achieve during a single game without reseting the console system multiple times

In 2017, a speedrunner named Eric "Omnigamer" Koziel disassembled Dragster's code in preparation of a book he was writing, and concluded that the fastest possible time would be 5.57 seconds. According to Todd Rogers, after he had submitted the picture of this 5.51 second run back in 1982, he had been called by Activision, who had asked him to verify how he had achieved such a score, because they had allegedly programmed a 'perfect run' of the game and were unable to achieve a time lower than 5.54. With a tick rate of 0.03 seconds, the 5.51 record claim would be two ticks faster than Koziel's analysis and one tick faster than the alleged Activision 'perfect run'.

Despite mounting pressure, nobody who had personally witnessed one of Rogers' alleged 5.51 second runs coming forward (even though they had supposedly happened in live settings), and Rogers not providing any further evidence, the Twin Galaxies team continued to side with him. This culminated in Twin Galaxies contracting electronics engineer and video game modder Ben Heck in November 2018 to work with Rogers to see if the 5.51 second result could be achieved in any possible way. After extensive testing and reverse-engineering of the console and game, Heck and Rogers failed to replicate a 5.51 second run, with 5.57 seconds being the fastest time they could achieve (as predicted by Koziel).

On January 23, 2018, Twin Galaxies posted an interview with Activision's David Crane, the original programmer of Dragster. Crane expressed having “a vague recollection of writing test code to determine the best possible score", but not remembering the exact result, and adding that if he had come up with a theoretical limit and a player would beat it by such a small margin, he would believe the player had found a way to play the game that was different from the assumptions used to build the theoretical model.

The interview with Crane was removed from the site after YouTuber Apollo Legend posted a video of evidence they had gathered from multiple sources, including proof that Rogers, as a leading member of Twin Galaxies, had been able to add his own made-up scores to the database without any further checks. Attributing the vast discrepancies between Rogers' alleged scores and the scores of other players solely to poor record keeping by Activision, other transcription errors or possibly unclear historical rules, as had been the case when several of his records had been rescinded in the previous years, was therefore no longer viable.

On January 29, 2018, Twin Galaxies finally decided to remove all of his scores and ban him from the site entirely. They notified Guinness World Records regarding their decision. The next day, Guinness World Records stripped all of Rogers' records. In August of 2019, Guinness World Records published the next edition of their Guinness World Records: Gamer's Edition which contained a retraction of both Todd Rogers' and Billy Mitchells' records in a separate article titled "The records that never were".

In 2020, shortly before the limitation period would have lapsed, Rogers filed a 500,000$ lawsuits against Spectrum Business Ventures Inc. (one of the former owners of Twin Galaxies), Guinness World Records Ltd. and Jason "Jace" Hall (the then-CEO of Twin Galaxies) for loss of reputation, loss of business opportunities and defamation. He particularly took issue with the "The records that never were" article in the printed Guinness World Records: Gamer's Edition. The lawsuit had to be re-filed and was finally dismissed due to Rogers trying to sue the American arm of Guinness World Records Ltd. instead of the United Kingdom company (which actually produces the Guinness World Records: Gamer's Edition his records were stripped from), and misspelling his own name as "Todd Togers" at some point.

In August 2022, Rogers filed a new lawsuit, this time against Guinness World Records Ltd. in the UK and EF Esport, LLC (a holding company managing some of Twin Galaxies' historical assets) over loss of business opportunities from an unidentified book which was allegedly in the works. The second lawsuit was dismissed shortly after in December 2022.

== See also ==
- Billy Mitchell
- Cheating in video games
