= Discs of Tron =

1983 video game

- North American arcade flyer
- Developer: Bally Midway (Note: Ported to Xbox 360 and developed by Backbone Entertainment.)
- Publisher: Bally Midway (Note: Published by Disney Interactive Studios on Xbox 360.)
- Designer: Robert Dinnerman
- Artist: Brian Colin
- Series: Tron
- Platforms: Arcade, Xbox 360
- Release: Arcade: NA: September 1983; Xbox 360: NA: February 13, 2008
- Genre: Action
- Mode: Single-player
- Arcade system: Bally Midway MCR-III

Discs of Tron is the second arcade video game based on the 1982 Disney film Tron. While the first Tron is a collection of four minigames, Discs of Tron is a single game inspired by Tron's disc-battles. It is set in an arena similar to the one in the jai alai–style sequence.

In 2008, a port to the Xbox 360, via Xbox Live Arcade, by Backbone Entertainment was published by Disney Interactive Studios.

== Gameplay ==
The gameplay of Discs of Tron is based on several scenes in the Tron film, combining the jai alai-like combat between Flynn and Crom with the disc combat between Tron and Sark. The player controls Tron in a one-on-one battle with Sark, presented in a fixed three-dimensional view behind Tron. Using a control scheme similar to that of the original Tron arcade game, the player moves around with a joystick, throws discs using a trigger button, and defends with a thumb button. The player uses a rotary dial to move a targeting reticle around the arena walls, and in later levels the player can also pull up and push down on the knob to aim up and down.

Each match takes place in a closed arena on top of platforms made of concentric disks, like in the jai alai sequence. Tron and Sark attempt to destroy each other by either directly hitting their opponent or causing him to fall off his platform. Tron and Sark can each throw up to three discs at a time. Assuming it is not destroyed, each disc automatically returns to the player (destroyed discs regenerate). Tron can defend himself by hitting Sark's discs with his own or by using a deflector, of which he has a limited supply. Sark can additionally attack Tron with high-speed missiles, chaser orbs, and "super chasers" (which consist of an orb and two orbiting disks), which cannot be deflected.

In later levels, platforms begin to move up and down vertically, requiring the player to aim up and down as well. Tron and Sark can bounce discs off the ceiling (similar to the energy ball in the jai alai sequence) with the goal of hitting one of their opponent's platforms. If successful, the platform flashes briefly and then disappears, reducing the character's movement or possibly causing him to fall and die. The platform reappears after about ten seconds. For some levels, a continuously scrolling wall of blocks appears between Tron and Sark; these blocks must be destroyed to open gaps in the wall before either character can hit the other.

The game has a total of twelve levels, with Sark becoming more aggressive throughout the game. Once the twelfth level is completed, levels repeat from six to twelve until the player runs out of lives.

== Development ==
The game's concept originated as a fifth minigame in the original Tron, which was cut due to time constraints. The concept was then repurposed for Discs of Tron, using more advanced hardware.

== Release ==
This game was released just before the video game crash of 1983. In 2004, it was released again in the Game Boy Advance game Tron 2.0. Disney Interactive Studios released an updated port on Xbox Live Arcade for the Xbox 360 in February 2008.

== Reception ==
In 1996, Next Generation listed the arcade version as number 87 on their "Top 100 Games of All Time". Calling it "one of the first games to attempt a 3D environment", they remarked that the fast-paced and complex gameplay works due to the responsive controls. They also praised the enemy AI as advanced for its time, though they complained that a head-to-head multiplayer mode was an obvious feature that had not been included.

=== Xbox Live Arcade ===
Reception

Aggregate score
Aggregator	Score
Metacritic	44/100

Review scores
Publication	Score
Eurogamer	5/10
GameSpot	4.5/10
GamesRadar+	2/5
GameZone	2.9/10
IGN	3/10
Official Xbox Magazine (UK)	2/10
Official Xbox Magazine (US)	8/10
TeamXbox	3/10

The Xbox Live Arcade version received "unfavorable" reviews according to the review aggregation website Metacritic. Official Xbox Magazine gave it a favorable review, while its UK edition gave it a negative review, nearly a year before its release worldwide.

== Competition ==
According to Twin Galaxies, David Bagenski of Syracuse, New York, United States, scored a world record 418,200 points on June 28, 1986, during the 1986 Video Game Masters Tournament.
