= Michael Zyda =

American computer scientist

Michael Zyda is an American computer scientist, video game designer, and former Professor of Computer Science Practice at USC Viterbi School of Engineering, University of Southern California. He was named an IEEE Fellow in 2019 and an ACM Fellow in 2020 for his research contributions in video game design and virtual reality. He is also the founding director of the Computer Science (Games) degree programs at USC Viterbi. Michael received his bachelor's degree in bioengineering from University of California, San Diego, master's degree in computer science from University of Massachusetts Amherst and doctoral degree in computer science from the McKelvey School of Engineering at Washington University in St. Louis.

Zyda was an expert witness for Billy Mitchell in a lawsuit against Twin Galaxies.
