= Billy Mitchell (gamer) =

American video game player (born 1965)

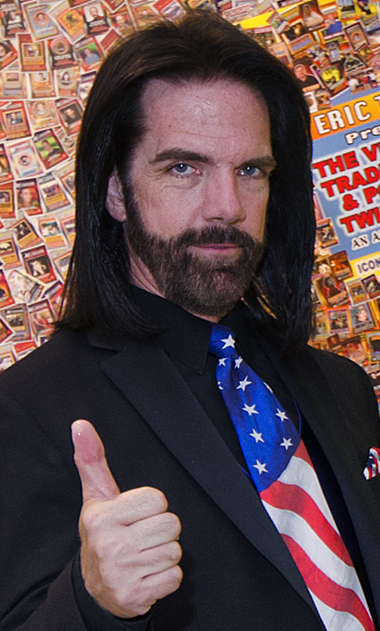
- Mitchell at a 2014 Twin Galaxies event

Personal information
- Born: William James Mitchell Jr. July 16, 1965 (age 61); Holyoke, Massachusetts, U.S.

Career information
- Games: Pac-Man; Donkey Kong

William James Mitchell Jr. (born July 16, 1965) is an American video game player. Throughout the 1980s and 1990s, he was recognized for numerous records on classic video games before disputes arose over their legitimacy beginning in 2018. Mitchell has also appeared in several documentaries on competitive gaming and retrogaming.

In 1982, Mitchell was featured in a photo spread in Life along with other video game champions during the height of the golden age of arcade video games. In 1999, Mitchell said he was the first person to attain a perfect score of 3,333,360 points on the arcade game Pac-Man. A 2007 documentary, The King of Kong: A Fistful of Quarters, follows his attempts to maintain the highest score on Donkey Kong after being challenged by newcomer Steve Wiebe.

In 2018, Mitchell's high scores on Donkey Kong were contested after members of the Twin Galaxies forums found discrepancies in the videos Mitchell had provided for The King of Kong, suggesting he had used emulation software to falsify his score. Twin Galaxies and Guinness World Records, which incorporated Twin Galaxies' scores into their records, removed Mitchell's scores based on this evidence. Mitchell then sued both organizations for defamation. While Guinness restored Mitchell's scores, Twin Galaxies countersued Mitchell. Both Mitchell and Twin Galaxies settled in 2024, and Twin Galaxies posted Mitchell's scores on a newly created historical leaderboard, which is not part of the current scoring records. Mitchell remains banned from Twin Galaxies competitions.

Mitchell's family owns the Rickey's restaurants in Hollywood, Florida, and Pembroke Pines, Florida, and he sells Rickey's World Famous Hot Sauce.

== Early life and first records ==
Mitchell was born on July 16, 1965, in Holyoke, Massachusetts.

In grade school, Mitchell became an avid pinball player. He was initially uninterested in video games, but as they became more popular, according to Mitchell, "[e]veryone was standing around the Donkey Kong machine and I wanted that attention". He began playing video games around the age of 16. His interest was also spurred by a friendly rivalry with a classmate, the two trying to outscore each other on both Pac-Man and Donkey Kong. Mitchell became curious whether Donkey Kong had a recorded world-record high score, and reached out to Walter Day—at Twin Galaxies, at the time a single arcade in Ottumwa, Iowa—who had started tracking such records. Day told Mitchell of a record of 1.4 million points claimed by Steve Sanders. In November 1982, Life brought several notable arcade players, including Mitchell and Sanders, to Ottumwa for a photoshoot. Mitchell challenged Sanders to Donkey Kong and demonstrated that the game had an impassable "kill screen" at level 22, while beating Sanders and setting a high score of 874,300. Later, Sanders admitted that he had lied about his previous Donkey Kong scores, and Twin Galaxies gave the record to Billy Mitchell who held it for more than 18 years. Around this time, Mitchell established a friendship with Robert Childs, who had a business buying and installing arcade cabinets in places such as laundromats.

In 1983, Mitchell was attending Chaminade-Madonna College Preparatory School. That summer, Day invited Mitchell, along with several other players from the photoshoot, to participate in the "Electronic Circus", a 40-city tour where the players would demonstrate their skill at arcade games at each stop. But the idea fell through, and Mitchell and others spent the summer months camping out at Twin Galaxies and competing for high scores on the video games there, with Mitchell focusing on only a few selected titles. Later that summer, Day founded the US National Video Game Team, a slimmer version of the Electronic Circus, which aimed to stop in a major city in each US state; but the inaugural event encountered many snags. Day continued to bring Mitchell on various trips to confirm high scores reported by players, with Mitchell frequently calling out bluffs. By 1984, Day named Mitchell the Twin Galaxies' player of the year, but due to the 1983 video game crash, Twin Galaxies had to close down its storefront in March 1984, though Day still tracked scores. After submitting a record score for BurgerTime in 1985, Mitchell moved away from video games for the next ten years, spending more time at his family's restaurant, Rickey's Restaurant, and eventually taking ownership of it.

== Career ==
=== Pac-Man challenge ===
Following Pac-Man's release in 1980, players had discovered that it too had a type of kill screen: on reaching level 256, half the screen would be filled with nonsense glyphs that made it impossible to complete the level and continue. Following a 1982 claim made by eight-year-old Jeffrey R. Yee of reaching more than 6 million points, which gained national coverage after President Ronald Reagan wrote to congratulate Yee, Mitchell worked with his friend Chris Ayra in 1983 to determine the route to the highest possible score on Pac-Man of 3,333,360, which would require a perfect no-death run and collecting all possible points on the nonsense side of level 256's split-screen, requiring knowledge of where the edible dots were.

In 1999, a group of Canadian players, including Rick Fothergill, were reportedly close to reaching the theoretical high score, leading Mitchell to return to video gaming to try to beat this group to the achievement. On May 8, 1999, Fothergill set the world record, just 90 points short of a perfect score. In response, on July 3, Mitchell achieved the perfect score at an arcade in Laconia, New Hampshire, and set the game's world record as recorded by Funspot and Twin Galaxies. For this, Twin Galaxies named him "Video Game Player of the Century", and Namco, the makers of Pac-Man, brought Mitchell to Japan for the Tokyo Game Show that year. After returning in November 1999, Mitchell offered $100,000 to the first person who could pass the split-screen level.

=== Return to gaming ===
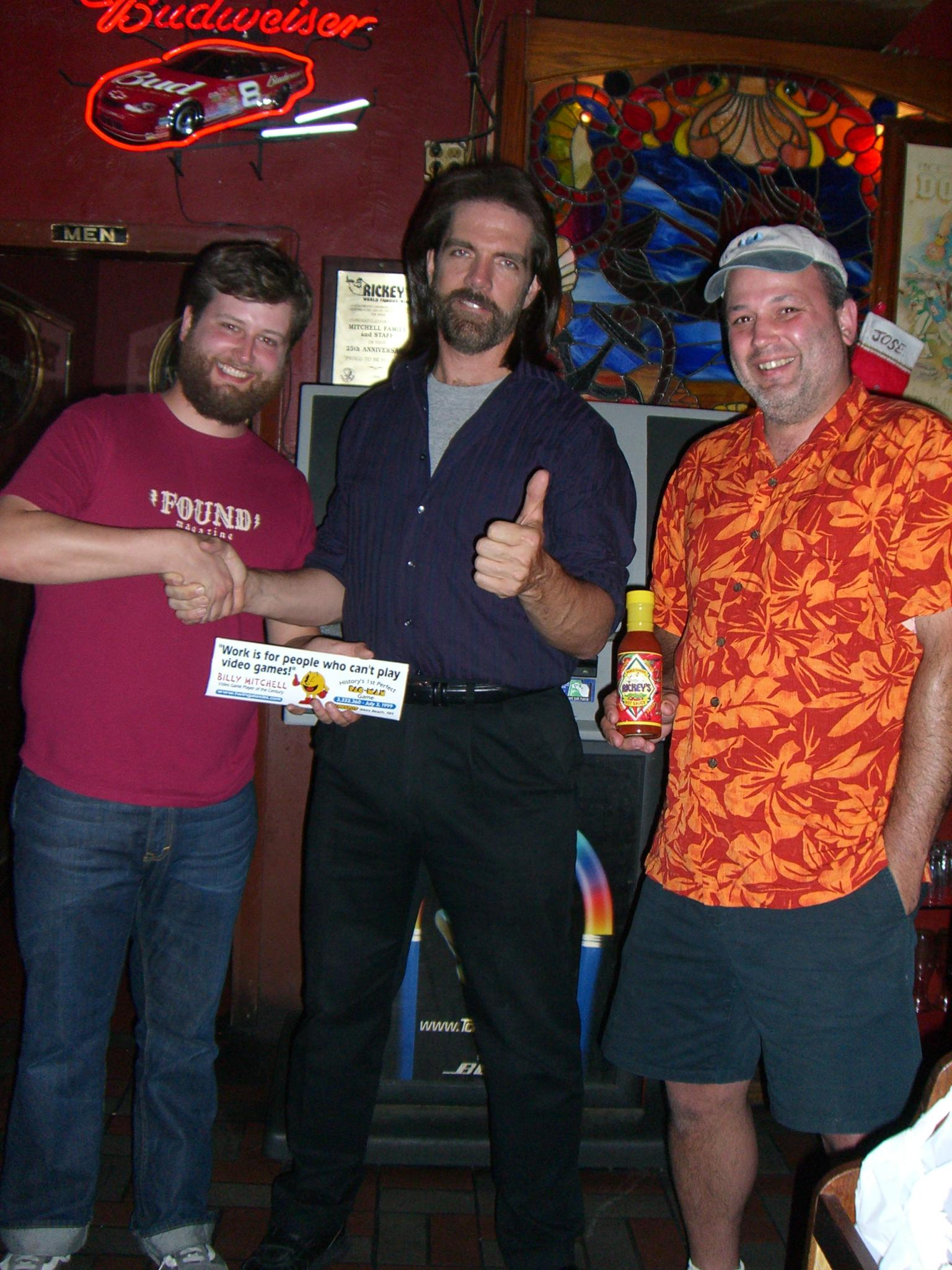
Mitchell (center) giving his signature thumbs-up with fans on December 19, 2007

In 2004, Mitchell achieved a Donkey Kong score of 933,900, in front of multiple witnesses at the Midwest Gaming Classic, his new personal best. Writing about Mitchell for the Oxford American in 2006, David Ramsey described Mitchell as "probably the greatest arcade video game player of all time". In 2004 and 2005, contender Steve Wiebe attempted to set a new world record in Donkey Kong, an event documented in the 2007 film The King of Kong: A Fistful of Quarters. Wiebe attempted to have Mitchell present at these events to challenge him directly, typically at Funspot arcades, as public demonstrations of high scores were preferred over video tapes. Mitchell had said, "To me, most important is to travel to a sanctioned location, like Funspot, that makes it official. If tomorrow Tiger Woods golfs a 59, big deal. If he does it at Augusta, that's where it counts." Mitchell failed to appear at Wiebe's events, saying he had not played games for half a year and needed to retrain and practice for the competition.

During Wiebe's attempts, he achieved a score of more than one million points on an arcade unit at his home, which was recorded on videotape and initially accepted by Twin Galaxies but later retracted, since Wiebe's unit used an unofficial "Double Donkey Board" that had circuitry for both Donkey Kong and Donkey Kong Jr. Later in his attempts, Wiebe again managed a high score in front of multiple witnesses at a New Hampshire Funspot, which Twin Galaxies accepted. Just hours later, Mitchell submitted his own tape to Twin Galaxies which purported to show him achieving a new high score of 1,047,200, which bested Wiebe's score and which Twin Galaxies accepted as the new official world record. Wiebe and others at the New Hampshire location complained to Twin Galaxies, and eventually Mitchell's score was nullified due to the game being on tape rather than witnessed, giving Wiebe the record again. After the film's release, Mitchell said he had not expected to be portrayed as a bad person, and that he had received hate mail and badgering phone calls because of the way the film was edited. In addition to the King of Kong, Mitchell appears in several other documentaries during the 2000s and 2010s, including Chasing Ghosts: Beyond the Arcade (2007), The King of Arcades (2014), and Man vs Snake: The Long and Twisted Tale of Nibbler (2015).

On July 26, 2007, 25 years after Mitchell's first record-setting performance, Mitchell again retook the Donkey Kong record with a score of 1,050,200. This score was known as the "Mortgage Brokers" score, as it was allegedly achieved while Mitchell was attending the annual convention for the Florida Association of Mortgage Brokers. The 2007 score was surpassed on February 26, 2010, by Hank Chien, who temporarily held the record. On July 24, 2010, Mitchell reclaimed the record with a score of 1,062,800 at the Boomers arcade in Dania, Florida. It was the last time he held the record after it was broken by Wiebe later that year, and others since then.

Mitchell placed eighth out of eight in the Microsoft Xbox 360 Pac-Man World Championships on June 4, 2007. In 2008, he became the first video game player on a Topps Allen & Ginter trading card.

In 2015, Mitchell filed a lawsuit against Cartoon Network, saying that in the series Regular Show, a character named Garrett Bobby Ferguson (GBF) who cheats at video games infringed on his likeness. United States District Court for the District of New Jersey Judge Anne Elise Thompson threw out the lawsuit, saying that "the television character does not match the plaintiff in appearance".

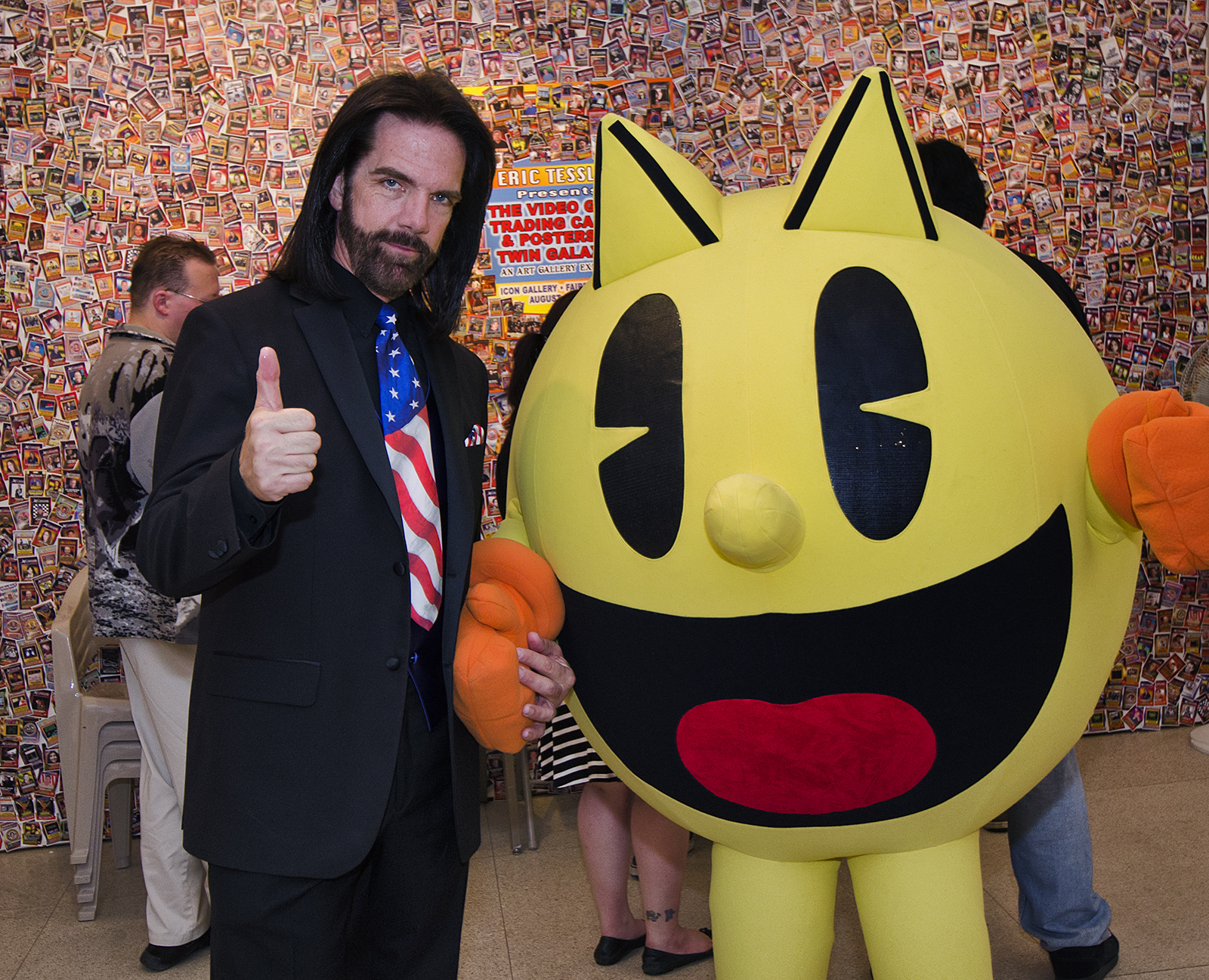
Billy Mitchell and Pac-Man at the 2014 Twin Galaxies / Walter Day trading card event at the Icon art gallery in Fairfield, Iowa

=== Disputed records ===
In August 2017, Jeremy Young, a moderator of the Donkey Kong Forum, expressed concern related to a video posted online by Childs of Mitchell's score at Boomers. Mitchell had played both Donkey Kong and Donkey Kong Jr. that day, breaking records for both, but was using the same cabinet for it, with Childs having swapped the circuit board between the runs. The videos did not show the complete record-breaking runs, and Young believed there might have been issues with the board swap. Mitchell and Childs affirmed that some parts of the board-switching were staged, but that that part of the recording was made well after the records had been set on legitimate hardware.

Young continued to investigate the video from Boomers as well as the King of Kong and Mortgage Brokers scores, and in early 2018 posted evidence that both scores were achieved on MAME, an emulator, rather than actual hardware. Young subsequently removed the three scores from the Donkey Kong Forum website for misrepresenting MAME emulation as authentic gameplay. Young's statement was backed up by Wes Copeland, a former holder of the Donkey Kong high score. Based on analysis of the scoring rate and frequencies in the game, he concluded that Mitchell's run showed a statistically unlikely rate of scoring. Further, it was determined that the verifier for the Boomers and Mortgage Brokers scores was former Twin Galaxies referee Todd Rogers, who had himself been banned from Twin Galaxies for submitting fraudulent scores, putting Mitchell's scores further in doubt.

Mitchell defended his scores on the East Side Dave Show shortly after this charge, saying: "I've never even played MAME. I don't have MAME loaded in my home." Mitchell added, "The film footage that he has, that Jeremy has, shows MAME play... I'm not disputing what he says. What I'm disputing is the fact that I want him to have the original tape." Mitchell also suggested that the tape footage Young had may have been fabricated. Young responded, "The amount of foresight, patience, and technical knowledge required would be staggering" to make such tapes. To support his case, Mitchell said he sent Twin Galaxies recordings of the gameplay from these high-score efforts along with other secondary evidence to refute charges of cheating.

On April 12, 2018, Twin Galaxies announced that an investigation conducted into Mitchell's submitted scores found conclusive evidence that Mitchell had not achieved on original arcade hardware at least two of the scores he submitted, as "an unmodified original DK arcade PCB did not output the display seen in the videotaped score performances." The footage of these two scores showed the game loading in a way that was visually identical to how the game loads when played on MAME. Twin Galaxies removed all of Mitchell's scores from their records and prohibited him from submitting scores in the future. Subsequently, Guinness World Records, which was supplied video game scores from Twin Galaxies, released a statement that it would remove Mitchell's scores: "The Guinness World Records titles relating to Mr. Mitchell's highest scores on Donkey Kong have all been disqualified due to Twin Galaxies being our source of verification for these achievements." The removal also included Mitchell's Pac-Man high score and first recorded perfect game: "Twin Galaxies was the original source of verification for these record titles and in line with their decision to remove all of Mr. Mitchell's records from their system, we have disqualified Mr. Mitchell as the holder of these two records."

Mitchell challenged these removals and threatened to sue both Twin Galaxies and Guinness if they did not restore his records. With the encouragement of his son, Mitchell used Twitch to broadcast scores equal to his past records. The situation between Mitchell and Twin Galaxies also created tension between Mitchell and several of his friends and acquaintances in the video game community. In early 2019, Mitchell filed lawsuits against Twin Galaxies as well as Young and YouTuber Apollo Legend. After a judge ruled against Twin Galaxies' attempt to dismiss the case under California's anti-SLAPP laws, Twin Galaxies filed a counterclaim against Mitchell and Walter Day in late 2020, alleging that the two had defrauded Twin Galaxies's current owners by selling the site's assets with the knowledge that the database contained fake scores, thus reducing its reputation and therefore its monetary value. In October 2021, a U.S. appeals court allowed Mitchell's suit against Twin Galaxies to proceed.

In June 2020, Guinness World Records announced that, after review, it could not find conclusive proof that Mitchell had used improper methods to achieve his high scores, and restored both Mitchell's Donkey Kong and Pac-Man records. In 2021 and 2022, Mitchell sent two concerns notices to speedrunner and YouTuber documentarian Karl Jobst, informing him he intended to file defamation lawsuits regarding Jobst using a clip in a video that referred to Mitchell as a cheater, and another covering his cheating allegations. The lawsuits were not filed.

In September 2022, forensic analyst Tanner Fokkens and five other experts published a report finding that, after technical analysis of his gameplay, Mitchell could not have obtained his records on original arcade hardware, the stage-to-stage transitions being consistent with those in MAME. Photographs from the 2007 Florida Association of Mortgage Brokers convention, uncovered in January 2023, showed that the Donkey Kong cabinet Mitchell used there appeared to have a modified joystick that may have allowed for eight-way motion rather than that of the standard four-way joystick. This would be in violation of Twin Galaxies' rules against playing on modified hardware. Eight-way joysticks are banned because they potentially give an unfair advantage over the game's original 4-way joystick by making it easier to perform moves in the game.

Mitchell and Twin Galaxies settled their cases in January 2024. The terms were not disclosed. Twin Galaxies re-posted Mitchell's scores the same month, and in a statement recognized that Michael Zyda, a professor from University of Southern California, testified as an expert that it is impossible to tell if Mitchell used improper hardware due to the low quality of the evidence presented. The scores were re-posted to a static "historical database" of scores prior to 2014, when Twin Galaxies changed ownership, but not as part of the current scoring records. Further, Twin Galaxies removed from their forums the original posts that had accused Mitchell of cheating. Site administrators of the Twin Galaxies forums acknowledged Twin Galaxies' take based on the expert testimony, but still maintained that Mitchell remains banned from further Twin Galaxies contests, thanked Jobst and other YouTubers for their work in providing their own evidence, and stated that interested readers should review all of the evidence to come to their own conclusions.

=== Defamation lawsuits ===
In 2020, Mitchell filed a lawsuit against YouTuber Ben Smith (known online as "Apollo Legend") over videos where Smith claimed Mitchell cheated in light of the high score disputes. The lawsuit was later settled, requiring Smith to remove videos relating to Mitchell and to refrain from discussing him further, and did not include any exchange of money. Smith later died by suicide in December 2020.

From May to July 2021, Jobst posted videos in which, according to Mitchell, Jobst claimed that Mitchell's lawsuit was a "significant factor in Mr Smith taking his own life", and wrongly alleged that Smith had paid "a large sum of money" in a settlement to Mitchell. Jobst later published a retraction video in July 2021. In September 2021, Mitchell sued Karl Jobst for defamation due to his videos on Mitchell's lawsuit against Ben Smith as well as videos accusing Mitchell of cheating. Jobst defended himself and said he "never said Apollo Legend attributed anything to Billy Mitchell" and that although he "...felt it harmed Apollo in multiple ways ... my opinion was those negative impacts wouldn't have helped his decision in the end". The Queensland court issued their verdict on April 1, 2025, awarding Mitchell $350,000 plus $40,000 in interest, also ordering Jobst to pay Mitchell's legal fees. While the judge accepted some of Jobst's counter arguments including that Mitchell had expressed joy when he incorrectly believed that Apollo Legend had died on an earlier occasion, it was ruled that Jobst had defamed Mitchell by implying "in essence, hounded Apollo Legend to death", and that the videos "caused substantial additional damage to Mitchell's reputation and caused him distress". Jobst could not cover the payment and raised $224,000 before filing for bankruptcy, of which it is estimated Mitchell received $150,000 after fees were deducted by the Australian Financial Security Authority. Mitchell's legal fees from suing Jobst were $686,671; he is accordingly estimated to have lost over $500,000 by pursuing the lawsuit.

Jobst filed a defamation suit against Mitchell in the United States in April 2026, rising from claims from Jobst that Mitchell had made knowingly false statements in regards to Jobst's bankruptcy and crowd funding efforts in the wake of the April 2025 Queensland decision.

== Personal life ==
Mitchell has three children and lives with his wife in Weston, Florida.

== Notable scores ==
Mitchell set high-score records on several games in the 1980s and 1990s. Since his initial high score in Donkey Kong in 1982, and record-breaking attempts between 2004 and 2010, others have matched or surpassed Mitchell's scores.

- In 1982, Mitchell set a record on Donkey Kong with 874,300 points.
- In 1984, he set a record score for BurgerTime of 7,881,050, which stood until 2005.
- In January 1985, he set a new record score for Ms. Pac-Man of 703,560, which stood until it was surpassed in 2001 by Ayra.
- He set a record score for Donkey Kong Jr. of 957,300 in 2004.
- He said he recaptured the world records for both Donkey Kong (1,062,800 points) and Donkey Kong Jr. (1,270,900) on the weekend of July 24, 2010. By September 2010, both these records were surpassed.

== In popular culture ==
"High Score", a 2011 episode of Regular Show, features Garrett Bobby Ferguson, a parody of Mitchell.

Eddie "The Fireblaster" Plant, a character from the 2015 film Pixels, was partially inspired by Mitchell.

== See also ==
- Cheating in video games
