= Man vs Snake =

2016 film

Man vs Snake: The Long and Twisted Tale of Nibbler
- Promotional poster, illustrated by Don Bluth
- Directed by: Andrew Seklir; Tim Kinzy
- Produced by: Andrew Seklir; Tim Kinzy; Christopher Murphy; Richard Gomes; David Seklir
- Starring: Tim McVey; Dwayne Richard; Enrico Zanetti; Walter Day; Billy Mitchell; Tina McVey
- Edited by: Tim Kinzy; Andrew Seklir, ACE
- Music by: Jess Stroup
- Production company: Playland Pictures
- Distributed by: Filmbuff
- Release dates: September 27, 2015 (Fantastic Fest); June 24, 2016
- Running time: 93 minutes

Man vs Snake: The Long and Twisted Tale of Nibbler is a 2015 documentary film directed by Andrew Seklir and Tim Kinzy. The film premiered on September 27, 2015, at Fantastic Fest Film Festival, followed by a Canadian premiere on April 17, 2016, and a worldwide release on June 24 of the same year. The film follows players as they try to accumulate a billion points on the 1982 arcade game Nibbler, a feat first achieved by Tim McVey in 1984.

== Synopsis ==
In the 1980s, Walter Day founds Twin Galaxies, a video arcade in Ottumwa, Iowa. Among the cabinets is Nibbler, a relatively obscure game with two unique properties. Firstly, the score counter has nine digits and rolls over, meaning it is theoretically possible for a player to achieve a score in excess of one billion points; secondly, the game's mechanics allow skilled players to take short breaks during play, meaning that it is feasible for players to marathon a gaming session for several hours or even days.

In the summer of 1983, Ottumwa native Tim McVey encounters Ms. Pac-Man champion Tom Asaki at Twin Galaxies as the latter attempts the first recorded billion-point Nibbler score. McVey impulsively tells a crowd of onlookers that, regardless of Asaki's score, he will beat it. Encouraged by Walter Day and friend Billy Mitchell, McVey makes seven attempts over the next several months in the hope of achieving the billion-point record. In January 1984, McVey spends two consecutive days playing Nibbler and finally achieves a billion-point score. Although he can continue playing, McVey decides to quit and go home, asking his mother to prepare him macaroni and cheese before going to sleep for thirty-six hours. Over the next several months, McVey becomes a local celebrity, he is presented the key to the city, and an official civic day—Tim McVey Day—is named in his honor. When Day expands Twin Galaxies into an organization that tracks and records video game scores, McVey becomes one of their luminaries, and his Nibbler session is regarded as legendary in the gaming community.

In the 2000s, McVey learns that an Italian native named Enrico Zanetti claims to have beaten his score in September 1984, shortly after reading about McVey in the Italian video game magazine Video Giochi. News footage from an Italian TV station demonstrates Zanetti breaking the score and the subsequent celebrity he received. While McVey acknowledges that Zanetti may have legitimately beaten him, Day claims that, because no one from Twin Galaxies witnessed the event, Zanetti's score is invalid. Zanetti himself is unfazed, content just to know that he achieved the score. Nonetheless, McVey decides to beat Zanetti's score and purchases a Nibbler machine of his own.

McVey practices on the machine in anticipation of beating the score at MAGFest, a live video game event, where he is scheduled to compete head-to-head with another Nibbler champion, Canadian gamer Dwayne Richard. At the event, Richard's cabinet malfunctions, disqualifying him from the event. Meanwhile, despite Mitchell and Day's support, McVey becomes physically and emotionally exhausted and decides to quit prematurely.

A few months later, in February 2009, Richard submits a video to Twin Galaxies depicting him surpassing one billion points and achieving the new high score on Nibbler. For a brief time, Richard is celebrated as the new champion. Documentarians Andy Seklir and Tim Kinzy compared various Nibbler performances to discover that aspects of Richard's gameplay was faster than normal. This put the legitimacy of Richard's score in question. A third party was used to conduct technical analysis of Richard's game board to find out what was wrong with the board. Ultimately, it was shown that a single pin, known as the "timing pin", on the 6502 processing chip was malfunctioning. The malfunction caused certain animations in the game to play at double speed, while not altering gameplay speed. Even though the gameplay speed was not affected, the net savings of the accelerated animations resulted in a potentially a multi-hour advantage in terms of achieving a billion-point score. As a result, Richard withdraws his score from consideration.

McVey makes several more attempts to reclaim the high score, each of which he live streams online; however, distractions from friends and family, McVey's physical condition, and McVey's own personal frustrations—such as the death of his father and his desire to give Nibbler the same credibility afforded to other arcade classics—sabotage his attempts. Ultimately, he decides to make one final attempt on Christmas Day with only his wife present. As Tim is approaching the record, his energy and will to press on begin to falter. After his wife gives him a bowl of macaroni and cheese, McVey feels reinvigorated and achieves the new world record on Nibbler.

In the wake of McVey's victory, Walter Day has a change of heart and declares that Twin Galaxies will begin grandfathering in old scores, as long as there is sufficient news documentation to prove their validity. As a result, Zanetti's high score is recognized and Twin Galaxies presents him with a certificate in recognition of his achievement. As a result of the publicity surrounding McVey's multiple attempts to retake the Nibbler score, Nibbler becomes a cult success on the retro gaming circuit, and players around the world not only beat McVey's record but begin to achieve higher and higher scores. Meanwhile, Richard decides to begin dedicating his time to charity work, and McVey begins pursuing his childhood dream of stock car racing.

== Production ==
The directors of the film, Andrew Seklir and Tim Kinzy, discovered Nibbler and Tim McVey's billion point high score while working together editing Battlestar Galactica. Seklir and Kinzy first visited McVey in 2008, and once the filming began, they intended for a high score competition in 2009 to serve as the film's climax, but instead found the scope of the story growing. The production undertook a Kickstarter crowdfunding campaign in September 2013, raising $61,440, this contributed to animation costs and generated publicity for the film. The film premiered on September 27, 2015, at the Fantastic Fest.

== Reception ==
Critical reception for the film has been positive. Man Vs Snake received positive reviews from IGN and Ain't It Cool News, the former of which wrote that "Man Vs. Snake is a lot like King of Kong, though not quite as good, lacking that film's many memorable moments and quotes. But it's a fine documentary in its own right; an emotional rollercoaster that will make you happy and sad and pleased that a guy like Tim McVey is out there, nibbling dots and avoiding his tail, all the while striving for his dream."

== Awards ==
- Best Documentary at Fantastic Fest (2015, won)
- Best Documentary Feature at the Calgary Underground Film Festival (2016, won)
- Best Editing at FilmQuest (2016, won)

== See also ==
- Golden age of arcade video games
