= The King of Kong =

2007 documentary by Seth Gordon

The King of Kong: A Fistful of Quarters
- Theatrical release poster
- Directed by: Seth Gordon
- Produced by: Ed Cunningham; Luis Lopez; J. Clay Tweel; Beau Bauman; Ross Tuttle
- Starring: Steve Wiebe; Billy Mitchell; Walter Day; Brian Kuh; Todd Rogers; Steve Sanders; Doris Self
- Cinematography: Ross Tuttle
- Edited by: Jim Bruce; J. Clay Tweel
- Music by: Craig Richey
- Distributed by: Picturehouse
- Release date: August 17, 2007
- Running time: 79 minutes
- Country: United States
- Language: English
- Box office: $790,128

The King of Kong: A Fistful of Quarters is a 2007 American documentary film about competitive arcade gaming directed by Seth Gordon. It follows Steve Wiebe in his attempts to take the high score record for the 1981 arcade game Donkey Kong from Billy Mitchell. The film premiered at the 2007 Slamdance Film Festival and was released in U.S. theaters in August 2007. It received positive reviews.

== Summary ==
Walter Day is the founder of Twin Galaxies, an organization dedicated to tracking high scores in arcade games, especially those from the golden age of arcade games of the early 1980s. Restaurateur Billy Mitchell holds the high score for several arcade games, including the original 1981 release of Donkey Kong.

In Redmond, Washington, out-of-work engineer Steve Wiebe has purchased a Donkey Kong cabinet in hopes of achieving the world record. Using his mathematical knowledge to identify exploitable patterns in the game, Wiebe sets a new record of 947,200 points in 2003. He sends the tape to Twin Galaxies as evidence and becomes a Seattle celebrity. Wiebe sets a new record with a score of 1,006,600 – the first-ever score over a million.

Mitchell and Twin Galaxies send two referees to investigate Wiebe's machine. They learn that the machine's circuit board was provided by Roy Shildt, a self-proclaimed fitness guru and pickup artist who claims the high score for Missile Command. Unbeknownst to Wiebe, Shildt and Mitchell have been at odds for years after Mitchell questioned Shildt's high score, causing Twin Galaxies to disqualify it. Twin Galaxies suspects that Shildt may have tampered with Wiebe's board and does not recognize Wiebe's record because it was made on video and using a board which may be questionable due to its association with Shildt.

Wiebe traveleled to a tournament at Funspot in Laconia, New Hampshire, to attempt a live high score for high-ranking Twin Galaxies members. Wiebe challenges Mitchell to a Donkey Kong competition, but Mitchell does not attend. Observing that Wiebe is playing a strong game, Brian Kuh, whom Wiebe believed to be "a disciple of Mitchell's", proceeds to alert nearby gamers that there could be a Donkey Kong kill screen coming up. The film portrays Kuh's act of drawing a crowd meant to pressure Wiebe, though it has the inverse effect and he feels more alert. Before the crowd, Wiebe sets a new high score of 985,600 and reaches the kill screen, ending the game. However, contrary to his statements that videotaped scores carry less validity than scores achieved in public, Mitchell sends his friend Brian Kuh to Funspot with a VHS depicting himself achieving a higher score of 1,047,200 points, which Kuh plays for the patrons and referees at the arcade. In a reversal of their policy on videotaped scores, Twin Galaxies proclaims Mitchell the record holder despite some skepticism about the video's authenticity, as head referee Robert Mruczek claims to have noticed the tape jumping from score to score. When Wiebe asks to see the tape himself, Kuh refuses.

Nine months later, Guinness World Records published Twin Galaxies' records — including Mitchell's latest score – and hosts a tournament in Mitchell's hometown of Hollywood, Florida. Wiebe again challenges Mitchell to a public competition, but Mitchell refuses. Wiebe fails to surpass the record, but Day acknowledges Wiebe's integrity and invites him to submit taped scores. At home, Wiebe achieves a new record of 1,049,100.

== Appearances ==
- Steve Wiebe, the challenger
- Billy Mitchell, described in the film as "the world's best gamer"
- Walter Day, the founder of Twin Galaxies
- Robert Mruczek, the chief referee of Twin Galaxies
- Brian Kuh, friend of Billy Mitchell and Donkey Kong player
- Steve Sanders, friend of Billy Mitchell and Donkey Kong player
- Dwayne Richard, classic gaming World Champion
- Roy Shildt (aka "Mr. Awesome"), Billy Mitchell's "nemesis"
- Todd Rogers
- Greg Bond, Mappy champion
- Doris Self, previous holder of the Q*bert record and title of oldest game champion
- Wiebe Family

== Release ==
The King of Kong premiered January 22, 2007, at the Slamdance Film Festival and has been shown at the Newport Beach Film Festival, the Seattle International Film Festival, the SXSW Film Festival, the TriBeCa Film Festival, the True/False Film Festival, the Aspen Comedy Festival, and the Fantasia Festival. The film opened in limited release in the United States on August 17, 2007, in five theaters, and by September 9, 2007, it had expanded to 39 theaters. The film's DVD release was on January 29, 2008.

== Reception ==
On review aggregator Rotten Tomatoes, the film has an approval rating of 97% based on 102 reviews, with an average rating of 8.15/10. The website's critical consensus reads, "The King of Kong is funny and compelling with more than a few poignant insights into human behavior. Director Seth Gordon presents the dueling King Kong players in all their obsessive complexity and with perfectly al dente observations." On Metacritic, the film has a weighted average score of 83 out of 100, based on 23 critics, indicating "universal acclaim".

Robert Wilonsky of the Village Voice called the film a "miniature masterpiece" and in August 2007 said it was his favorite film of the year so far. Pete Vonder Haar of Film Threat gave the film five stars and said "It's not just one of the best documentaries I've ever seen, it's one of the best movies I've ever seen". Keith Phipps of The Onion''s AV Club gave the film an "A−" and said it was "a film about what it takes to make it in America." Peter Travers of Rolling Stone gave the film three out of four stars, writing: "Who would have guessed that a documentary about gamers obsessed with scoring a world record at Donkey Kong would not only be roaringly funny but serve as a metaphor for the decline of Western civilization?" Roger Ebert of the Chicago Sun-Times similarly gave the film three out of four and called it "a documentary that is beyond strange." Critic Richard Roeper stated that the film "deserves an Oscar nomination for Best Documentary" in 2007 on At The Movies.

Ann Hornaday of The Washington Post wrote: "Is there anything more tiresome than watching people play video games?" and "The competition is so vicious because the stakes are so low." However, all thirty-one Rotten Tomatoes “Top Critics” who reviewed the film upon its release praised it—often effusively—except for Hornaday. Several years later, Stephen Garrett of Time Out New York called it "moderately entertaining and ultimately kind of pathetic" and felt the early-1980s arcade subculture is explored in greater depth in the documentary Chasing Ghosts: Beyond the Arcade.

The North Texas Film Critics Association named The King of Kong Best Documentary for 2007. The Boston Society of Film Critics named it the runner-up for Best Documentary Feature of 2007. It was nominated for Best Documentary Feature of 2007 by the Broadcast Film Critics Association. The film was also nominated for Best Documentary Feature by the Chicago Film Critics Association, but lost to Sicko. It appeared on several critics' top ten lists of the best films of 2007.

== Emulation controversy ==
On February 2, 2018, Twin Galaxies member Jeremy Young filed a complaint regarding several of Mitchell's records. The validity of Mitchell's August 7, 2010, high score, set at Boomers-Grand Prix Arcade, could not be determined. The referee who allegedly witnessed and certified the record was gamer Todd Rogers, who appears in The King of Kong and was exposed as having fabricated scores earlier in 2018.

On April 12, 2018, Twin Galaxies released an article on their website titled Dispute Decision: Billy Mitchell's Donkey Kong & All Other Records Removed. This article announced that Mitchell had used emulation software to achieve the Donkey Kong high score rather than an arcade machine; this is banned because it allows players to cheat in undetectable ways. Mitchell was stripped of his records and banned from submitting further scores, and Wiebe was recognized as the first person to score over a million points. Due to this, Mitchell's scores were also removed from the Guinness World Record book. The investigative committee cited footage obtained from the King of Kong DVD special features as instrumental in exposing Mitchell.

== Adaptations and sequels ==
In 2014, King of Kong: The Musical, which parodied the characters and events depicted in the documentary, began its limited run.

In a 2018 interview, director Seth Gordon discussed a possible scripted film adaptation. Gordon said that the movie might be a sequel instead of a remake, telling the story of how the documentary changed both men's lives, as well as their continuing rivalry.

== See also ==
- Golden age of arcade video games
