= Nibbler (video game) =

1982 video game

- 1982 arcade flyer
- Developer(s): Rock-Ola
- Publisher(s): Arcade: NA/EU: Rock-Ola; JP: Taito; Ports; Datasoft
- Designer(s): Joseph H. Ulowetz; John M. Jaugilas
- Platform(s): Arcade, Apple II, Atari 8-bit
- Release: Arcade: NA: October 29, 1982; EU: Late 1982; JP: January 1983; Ports; 1983: Atari 8-bit
- Genre(s): Maze, snake
- Mode(s): Single-player, multiplayer

Nibbler is an arcade snake maze video game released in 1982 by Chicago-based developer Rock-Ola. The player navigates a snake through an enclosed maze, consuming objects, and the length of the snake increases with each object consumed. The game was the first to include nine scoring digits, allowing players to surpass one billion points.

The arcade game was distributed in Japan by Taito in 1983. Home versions were published in 1983 by Datasoft for the Atari 8-bit computers and Apple II.

== Gameplay ==
Nibbler is a maze-and-munch game, among many others which followed Pac-Man, but the game features no enemies, and a life is lost only when the snake bites itself.

== Reception ==
In the United States, it was among the thirteen highest-grossing arcade games of 1983.

== Competitive play ==
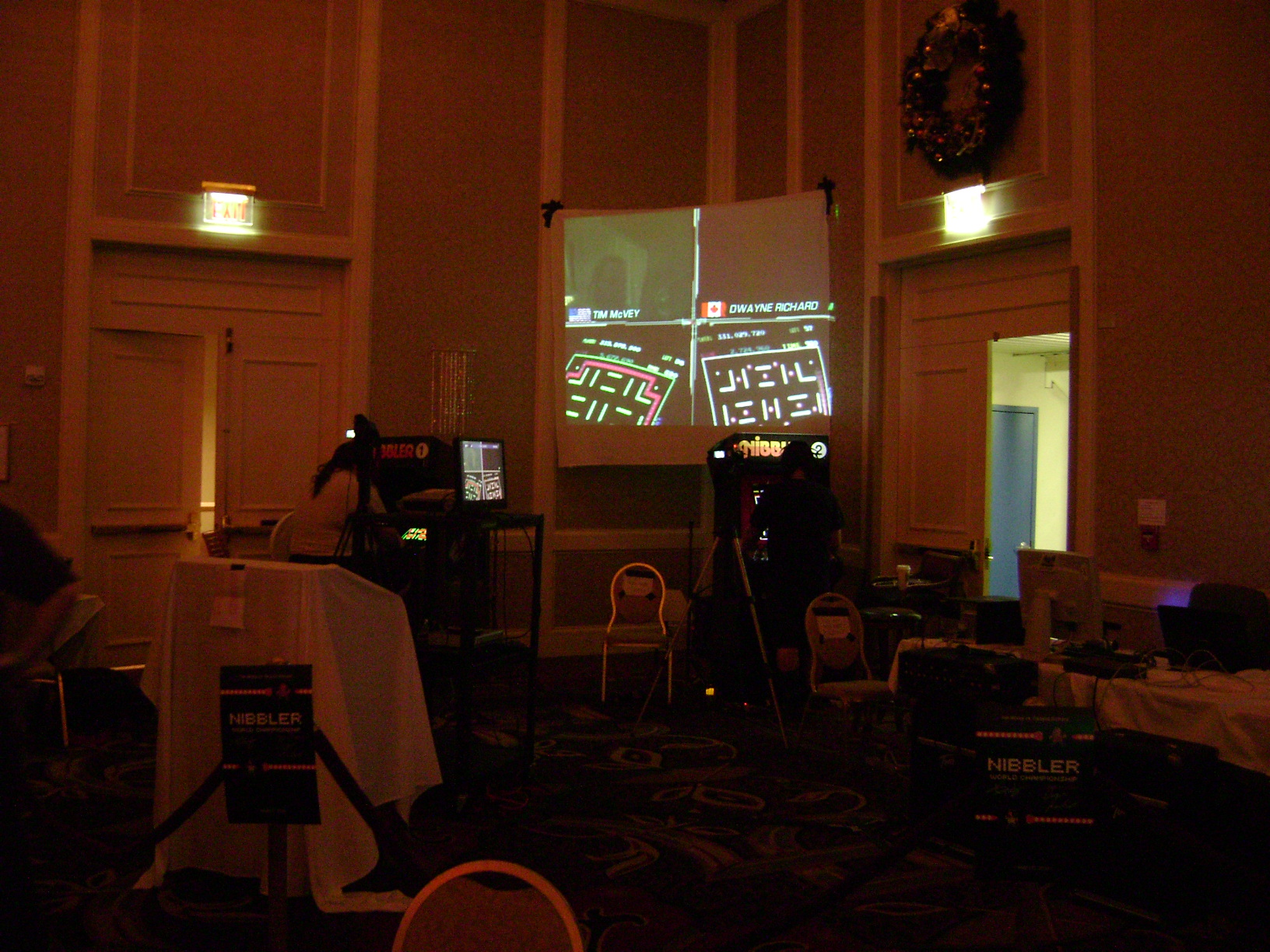
World-record attempts by Tim McVey and Dwayne Richard at MAGFest in 2009

Nibbler is the first video game to feature a nine-digit scoring system allowing players to score one billion points. The first to achieve this feat was a seventeen-year-old named Tim McVey, who scored 1,000,042,270 points on January 17, 1984, while playing continuously for 44 hours over two days at Walter Day's Twin Galaxies arcade in Ottumwa, Iowa. A local news crew arrived to film him on location as he closed in on the record. McVey stated in a 2016 interview that he quit playing of his own accord due to exhaustion after setting the mark. For his achievement, McVey, an Ottumwa native, had the day of January 28, 1984 declared in his honor. He additionally received his own Nibbler machine as a prize, which he later gave to a rival arcade in exchange for two hundred dollars in game tokens.

In September 1984, Italian player Enrico Zanetti topped McVey with a 1,001,073,840 score, but it was not officially recognized by Twin Galaxies, who ultimately stopped verifying record scores for the game altogether; however, this score was grandfathered in retroactively as a historical record due to a new ruling that permitted significant and well-documented media coverage, although the former record was only officialized after McVey took back the record from Rick Carter. In September 2008, Dwayne Richard of Grande Prairie, Alberta, gained media attention when he fell short in his attempt to become the first player since McVey to officially surpass one billion points.

McVey's mark consequently stood for nearly three decades before it was surpassed twice, including once by Richard in 2009, but McVey was still recognized by Guinness World Records as the official record holder because others' scores were never submitted for verification. Rick Carter of Glen Burnie, Maryland officially claimed the new world record with a score of 1,002,222,360 on July 31, 2011. McVey regained the mark on December 25, 2011, with a score of 1,041,767,060.

On May 1, 2023, Italian player Alessandro Porro, from Triest, totaled a score of 1,233,326,800 after 51 hours and 55 minutes. The performance is broadcast live on Twitch and the new world record comes a few days later formed by Twin Galaxies.

== Legacy ==
Buzzworm is a Nibbler clone for the TRS-80 Color Computer published by Novasoft in 1984.

The documentary Man vs. Snake: The Long and Twisted Tale of Nibbler, about the difficulties of achieving a one-billion point score on Nibbler, was released in 2016. During the credits Elijah Hayter is shown with a score of 1,042,774,470 in June 2012, and Rick Carter is shown with 1,231,372,670 points after 53 hours and 8 minutes in November 2012. As of January 2020 neither of these scores have been credited as official by Twin Galaxies.

== See also ==
- Eyes, a Rock-Ola game with similar visual elements
