= Chasing Ghosts: Beyond the Arcade =

- Directed by: Lincoln Ruchti
- Produced by: Michael Verrechia
- Cinematography: Lisa Wiegand
- Edited by: Eddie Brega
- Release date: January 22, 2007 (Sundance Film Festival)
- Running time: 90 minutes
- Country: United States
- Language: English

Chasing Ghosts: Beyond the Arcade is a documentary film directed by Lincoln Ruchti about the golden age of video arcade games. The film premiered January 22, 2007 at the Sundance Film Festival and has also been shown at the 2007 Los Angeles Film Festival, as well as other film festivals.

== Synopsis ==
In the 1980s, video games were synonymous with arcades, and games were bringing in enough quarters to fill the Rose Bowl. This led Iowa entrepreneur Walter Day (with the support of various game manufacturers) to declare himself the sole authority on high scores. In 1982, Day launched his Twin Galaxies International Scoreboard. Teenage superstars came from all over North America to join Walter in a Life magazine feature spread, which recognized them as video game world champions. This led to the nationally televised 1982 Video Game World Championships, a touring National Video Game Team, and the promise of fame, fortune and groupies.

The film revisits Day and the Life players, now middle-aged men, as they reminisce on the arcade scene, its demise, and the dreams that crashed with it.

== Reception ==
Stephen Garrett of Time Out New York compared the film to the documentary The King of Kong: A Fistful of Quarters, which covers similar ground and also premiered at the same time, opining that Chasing Ghosts explores the material far better.

Pixar's Andrew Stanton, director of the films WALL-E and Finding Nemo, saw the premiere of the film at the 2007 Sundance Film Festival and enjoyed it so much that he arranged for a private screening of the film at Pixar's Emeryville, California campus.

== Appearing in the LIFE Magazine photograph ==
Gamer	Home Town in 1982	Game of Note	In '05 Reunion/Documentary
Sam Blackburn	Wilmington, North Carolina	Eagle	Yes
Jeff Brandt	Bloomington, Illinois	Donkey Kong Jr.	
Michael Buck	Ottumwa, Iowa	Carnival	
Leo Daniels	Carolina Beach, North Carolina	Tempest	Yes
Eric Ginner	Mountain View, California	Moon Patrol	
Ben Gold	Dallas, Texas	Stargate	Yes
Steve Landin	McHenry, Illinois	Jungle King	
Mike Lepkosky	Spring, Texas	Ms. Pac-Man	
Billy Mitchell	Hollywood, Florida	Centipede	Yes
Doug Nelson	Bakersfield, California	Pac-Man	
Darren Olsen (Chris Steele)	Calgary, Alberta	Centipede	Yes
Mark Robichek	Mountain View, California	Tutankham	Yes
Steve Sanders	Clinton, Missouri	Donkey Kong	Yes
Ned Troide	Palm Harbor, Florida	Defender	
Todd Walker	San Jose, California	Joust	Yes
Joel West	Shelby, North Carolina	Berzerk	Yes

== 2005 reunion ==
A modern reunion was held on September 24, 2005 in front of the downtown theater in Laconia, New Hampshire, in an attempt to mirror closely the look and feel of the original photo. Footage of this reunion is included in the final scenes of Chasing Ghosts: Beyond the Arcade. The group photo includes Walter Day, Billy Mitchell, Steve Sanders, Robert Mruczek, Ben Gold, Joel West, Sam Blackburn, Todd Rogers, Ron Bailey, Darren Olson (Chris Steele) and Kent Farries.
