= Video Game Masters Tournament =

The Video Game Masters Tournament was an event that was created in 1983 by Twin Galaxies to generate world record high scores for the 1984 U.S. Edition of the Guinness Book of World Records. It was the most prestigious contest of that era and the only one that the Guinness book looked to for verified world records on video games at the time. This contest was conducted under the joint efforts of Twin Galaxies and the U.S. National Video Game Team in 1983, 1984 and 1985 and by the U.S. National Video Game Team alone in 1986 and 1987.

During its first year, 1983, the event was called the North America Video Game Challenge (State Teams Tournament), but was changed to the Video Game Masters Tournament by the second year.

In order to administer the contest, Twin Galaxies appointed the U.S. National Video Game Team to the task of collecting and verifying scores from the eight cities that participated in the 1983 edition of this event. The cities were Seattle, Washington; Lake Odessa, Michigan; Coeur D'Alene, Idaho; Omaha, Nebraska; Dayton, Ohio; San Jose, California; Upland, California and Chicago, Illinois.

The 1984 event was also conducted in eight cities while the 1985 event was conducted in 35 cities.

== 1983 Event - August 24–28, 1983 ==
Event date	Location	Arcade	Winner
8/24/1983 - 8/28/1983	Seattle, WA	Arnold's on the Ave.	TBD
8/24/1983 - 8/28/1983	Coeur D'Alene, ID	Mr. Deli	TBD
8/24/1983 - 8/28/1983	Omaha, NE	Space City	TBD
8/24/1983 - 8/28/1983	Villa Park, IL	Video Wizard	TBD
8/24/1983 - 8/28/1983	Lake Odessa, MI	Lake Odessa Fun Center	TBD
8/24/1983 - 8/28/1983	Dayton, OH	Video City	TBD
8/24/1983 - 8/28/1983	San Jose, CA	Video Paradise	TBD
8/24/1983 - 8/28/1983	Upland, CA	Starship Video	TBD

== 1984 Event - June 29 - July 1, 1984 ==
Event date	Location	Arcade	World records
6/29/1984 - 7/1/1984	Seattle, WA	Arnold's on the Ave.	TBD
6/29/1984 - 7/1/1984	Wilmington, NC	World Class Amusements	TBD
6/29/1984 - 7/1/1984	New York, NY	Broadway Arcade	TBD
6/29/1984 - 7/1/1984	Victoria, BC, Canada	Johnny Zee's	TBD
6/29/1984 - 7/1/1984	Miami, FL	Cloverleaf Golf N Games	TBD
6/29/1984 - 7/1/1984	Anchorage, AK	Space Station Arcade	TBD
6/29/1984 - 7/1/1984	San Jose, CA	Space Shuttle Arcade	TBD
6/29/1984 - 7/1/1984	Oklahoma City, OK	Starbucks Family Fun	TBD

== 1985 Event - June 28–30, 1985 ==
The 1985 Video Game Masters Tournament was conducted as a fundraiser to raise donations for CARE. The fundraiser set aside half of all entry fees for the CARE/Twin Galaxies African Relief Fund.

Event date	Location	Arcade	World records
6/28/1985 - 6/30/1985	Seattle, WA	Arnold's on the Ave.	TBD
6/28/1985 - 6/30/1985	Kansas City, MO	Fun Factory	TBD
6/28/1985 - 6/30/1985	Hilo, Hawaii	Fun Factory	TBD
6/28/1985 - 6/30/1985	Frederick, MD	Fun Factory	TBD
6/28/1985 - 6/30/1985	Honolulu, Hawaii	TBD	
6/28/1985 - 6/30/1985	North Bergen, NJ	Big Mouth Pizza	TBD
6/28/1985 - 6/30/1985	Victoria, BC, Canada	Johnny Zee's Arcade	TBD
6/28/1985 - 6/30/1985	Dawson's Creek, BC, Canada	Celebrity Fun Ctr. II	TBD
6/28/1985 - 6/30/1985	San Jose, CA	Space Shuttle Arcade	TBD
6/28/1985 - 6/30/1985	Anchorage, AK	Space Station Arcade	TBD
6/28/1985 - 6/30/1985	Citrus Heights, CA	The Game Room Arcade	TBD
6/28/1985 - 6/30/1985	College Station, TX	Games Galore	TBD
6/28/1985 - 6/30/1985	Riverside, CA	Castle Park Arcade	TBD
6/28/1985 - 6/30/1985	Montreal, Quebec, Canada	Amusecorp	TBD
6/28/1985 - 6/30/1985	Montclair, CA	Huish Family Fun Ctr.	TBD
6/28/1985 - 6/30/1985	Valdosta, GA	TBD	TBD

== 1986 Event - June 27–29, 1986 ==
Event date	Location	Arcade	World records
6/27/1986 - 6/29/1986	Virginia Beach, VA	Aladdin's Castle #251	TBD
6/27/1986 - 6/29/1986	Maryland Heights, MO	Aladdin's Castle #462	TBD
6/27/1986 - 6/29/1986	Culver, CA	Aladdin's Castle #91	TBD
6/27/1986 - 6/29/1986	Rancho Cucamonga, CA	Galaxy Arcade	TBD
6/27/1986 - 6/29/1986	Citrus Heights, CA	The Game Room	TBD
6/27/1986 - 6/29/1986	Bronx, NY	Playland Arcade	TBD
6/27/1986 - 6/29/1986	San Jose, CA	Space Shuttle Arcade	TBD
6/27/1986 - 6/29/1986	Houston, TX	Aladdin's Castle #120	TBD
6/27/1986 - 6/29/1986	Brea, CA	Flipper Flapper	TBD
6/27/1986 - 6/29/1986	Dublin, GA	Aladdin's Castle	TBD

== 1987 Event - July 3–5, 1987 ==
Event date	Location	Arcade	World records
7/3/1987 - 7/5/1987	No. Miami Beach, FL	Aladdin's Castle #378	TBD
7/3/1987 - 7/5/1987	Annapolis, MD	Aladdin's Castle	TBD
7/3/1987 - 7/5/1987	Culver, CA	Aladdin's Castle #91	TBD
7/3/1987 - 7/5/1987	Wintersville, OH	Aladdin's Castle	TBD
7/3/1987 - 7/5/1987	Bronx, NY	Playland Arcade	TBD
7/3/1987 - 7/5/1987	Independence, MO	Aladdin's Castle	TBD
7/3/1987 - 7/5/1987	San Jose, CA	Aladdin's Castle #188	TBD
7/3/1987 - 7/5/1987	Middlesboro, KY	Aladdin's Castle	TBD
7/3/1987 - 7/5/1987	Lakewood, CA	Aladdin's Castle #283	TBD
7/3/1987 - 7/5/1987	Mesa, AZ	Aladdin's Castle	TBD
7/3/1987 - 7/5/1987	Etiwanda, CA	Aladdin's Castle	TBD
7/3/1987 - 7/5/1987	Beverly Hills, CA	Aladdin's Castle	TBD
7/3/1987 - 7/5/1987	Waunakee, WI	Aladdin's Castle	TBD
7/3/1987 - 7/5/1987	Fredericksburg, VA	Aladdin's Castle	TBD
7/3/1987 - 7/5/1987	Boulder, CO	Aladdin's Castle	TBD
7/3/1987 - 7/5/1987	Hollis, NY	Aladdin's Castle	TBD
7/3/1987 - 7/5/1987	Meridian, MS	Aladdin's Castle	TBD
7/3/1987 - 7/5/1987	Madison, WI	Aladdin's Castle	TBD
7/3/1987 - 7/5/1987	Monrovia, CA	Aladdin's Castle	TBD
7/3/1987 - 7/5/1987	Marshalltown, IA	Aladdin's Castle	TBD
7/3/1987 - 7/5/1987	Miami Beach, FL	Cloverleaf Golf N Games	TBD
