= Let's Play Gaming Expo =

Annual gaming convention in Irving, Texas, US

- Status: Active
- Genre: Gaming
- Venue: Irving Convention Center at Las Colinas
- Location: Irving, Texas
- Country: United States
- Years active: 2015–19
- Inaugurated: 2015
- Website: www.letsplaygamingexpo.com

Let's Play Gaming Expo is a gaming convention started in 2015. It is a three-day convention that is usually held annually in the Summer in Irving, Texas. It's a very interactive convention that specialized in gaming including board, card, and video.

There was no expo in 2020 as the COVID-19 pandemic was to blame.

== Event History ==
Dates	Location	Atten.	Guests
August 1–2, 2015	The Plano Centre; Plano, Texas		
June 18–19, 2016	The Plano Centre; Plano, Texas		
August 5–6, 2017	Irving Convention Center at Las Colinas; Irving, Texas		
July 27–29, 2018	Irving Convention Center at Las Colinas; Irving, Texas		
August 9–11, 2019	Irving Convention Center at Las Colinas; Irving, Texas		
