= Steve Wiebe =

American video game player (born 1969)

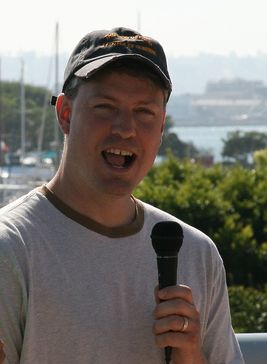
- Wiebe in 2007
- Born: Steven J. Wiebe; January 3, 1969 (age 57); Seattle, Washington, U.S.
- Education: University of Washington (BS); City University (M.Ed)
- Occupation: Competitive gamer
- Spouse: Nicole
- Children: 2

Steven J. Wiebe (/ˈwiːbi/; born January 3, 1969) is an American two-time world champion of the video game Donkey Kong, most recently holding the title from September 20, 2010, to January 10, 2011, with a high score of 1,064,500. Wiebe was the first person to achieve over a million points on Donkey Kong, with 1,006,600 on July 4, 2004. He is one of the primary subjects of the 2007 documentary The King of Kong: A Fistful of Quarters. Like his Donkey Kong rival Billy Mitchell, Wiebe was put in a Topps Allen & Ginter baseball set, which is featured in the 2009 edition of the baseball product.

== Early life ==
Wiebe was born in Seattle, Washington to Ryan and Sandy Wiebe. He has a brother, Ryan, and a sister, Cathy. He attended Newport High School in Bellevue, Washington. He developed an interest in music at an early age.

He graduated with a BS in mechanical engineering from the University of Washington in 1991.

== Career ==
From 1996 to 1999 he worked at Boeing as a testing and analysis engineer, and from 1999 to 2001 he worked at the Bsquare corporation in Bellevue as a software testing engineer. In 2004 Wiebe earned a Master of Education at City University of Seattle.

In December 2009, he released a Contemporary Christian album, The King of Song.

== Donkey Kong high scores ==
- On August 19, 2007, at the Alamo Drafthouse in Austin, Texas, Wiebe scored 695,500 points while Twin Galaxies Founder Walter Day served as the official referee.
- On March 6, 2008, in Las Vegas, Nevada, Wiebe played in front of a fluctuating crowd of 1,900 party attendees in the TAO Nightclub in the Venetian Casino during Microsoft's MIX08 event. During that attempt, Wiebe achieved two scores: first scoring 929,800 points and reaching the kill screen and then 579,300 points on the second try. According to Twin Galaxies records, this was the sixth time someone reached the "Kill Screen" during a public gaming performance (he and Mitchell each did this three times). Again, Wiebe performed under the supervision of Walter Day, who noted: "Possibly the biggest challenges Wiebe had to overcome were the loud nightclub music, the chaotic environment and the late hours."
- On July 17, 2008, Wiebe made his third attempt to break the Donkey Kong high score at the Twiistup 4 event in Santa Monica, California, but was unsuccessful on two consecutive attempts, scoring 340,500 and 466,100.
- In October 2008, at the 2008 E for All Expo, he scored 1,000,200 in front of a large crowd. This was only the third time a million-point score had been achieved in public.
- On April 24, 2009, Wiebe temporarily took command of the Donkey Kong Jr. title, eclipsing both Mitchell and previous record holder Icarus Hall with a score of 1,139,800. This was later passed by Mark L. Kiehl with a score of 1,147,800.
- On June 2, 2009, Wiebe reached a score of 923,400 at E3 2009 during his first attempt that day. On his second attempt he reached 653,700. A third attempt was interrupted by a brief power failure. After power was restored, Wiebe made a fourth attempt, in which he reached 989,400 before the kill screen ended it. These attempts were broadcast online via G4TV.
- On February 17, 2010, Wiebe recaptured the Donkey Kong Jr. high score title with a verified 1,190,400 points, beating out previous record holder Kiehl. Day again served as the official referee. On April 19, 2010, Kiehl recaptured the Donkey Kong Jr. high score with a verified 1,253,000 points. According to Twin Galaxies, Wiebe now has the fifth-highest score in Donkey Kong Jr. with 1,190,400 points.
- On September 20, 2010, Wiebe regained the title of Donkey Kong champion, verified by Twin Galaxies through a DVD recording of play on August 30, 2010, with a score of 1,064,500 points.
- On January 10, 2011, Wiebe lost the title of world record holder when his previous high score of 1,064,500 points on Donkey Kong was beaten by plastic surgeon Hank Chien's 1,068,000-point score. The attempt took two hours and 45 minutes.
- On April 12, 2018, Wiebe was recognized as the first person to ever reach a score of 1,000,000 points. This title was granted by Twin Galaxies after it investigated Mitchell, the previous record holder. Mitchell was found either to have used hardware emulation such as MAME, or to have otherwise modified his evidence. He was subsequently stripped of all records submitted to Twin Galaxies. MAME is acceptable for use by Twin Galaxies, but requires a different set of guidelines and submission process and is listed on a different leaderboard. Mitchell claimed a high score submission for the original Donkey Kong arcade hardware; only non-modified Donkey Kong arcade cabinets may be used.
- On June 24, 2020, Wiebe broke the 1.1 million point barrier by submitting a score of 1,106,200 to Twin Galaxies. This was performed on original Arcade hardware and stands as the 12th-best score on the website.

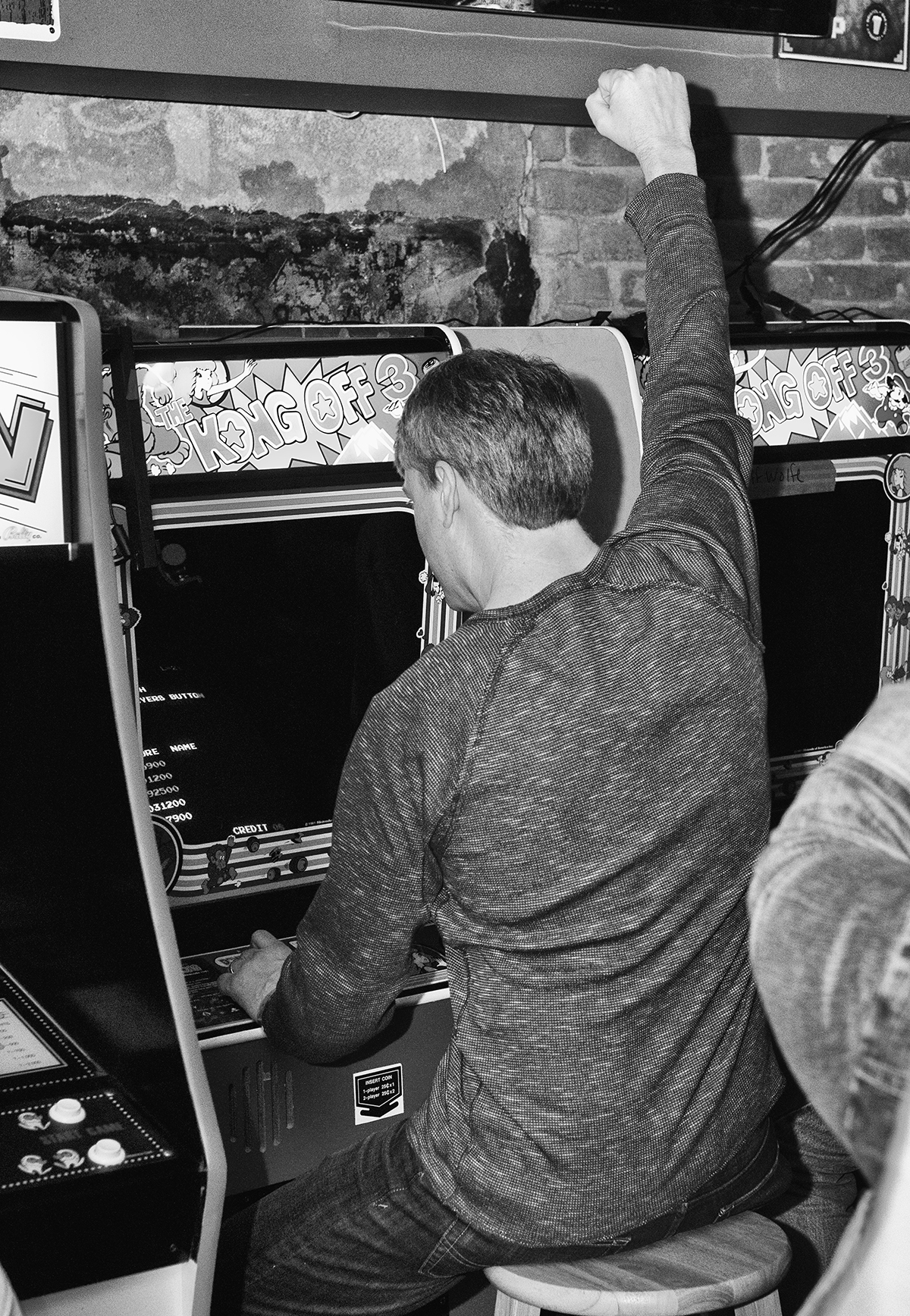
Steve Wiebe at the Kong Off 3 event

== Media appearances ==
Wiebe was interviewed about the documentary The King of Kong: A Fistful of Quarters on The Late Late Show with Craig Ferguson and on G4's Attack of the Show!. He voiced his own cartoon character on Code Monkeys in the episode "The Great Recession". He appeared as "Jim" in the film Four Christmases, directed by Seth Gordon, the director of The King of Kong. In 2011 Wiebe made a cameo appearance in Gordon's film Horrible Bosses as Thomas, Head of Security. In 2015 he had a role in the Adam Sandler movie Pixels as "DARPA Scientist". He played Stephen Davidson in episode 1 of Sneaky Pete on Amazon Video.

In the summer of 2026, Wiebe starred in a promotional trailer for the official Lego Donkey Kong Arcade set.

== Personal life ==
Wiebe lives in Redmond, Washington with his wife, daughter, and son. He is a math teacher at Redmond High School.
