= Funspot =

Arcade and entertainment complex in Weirs Beach, Laconia, New Hampshire, United States

Coordinates: 43°36′50″N 71°28′37″W

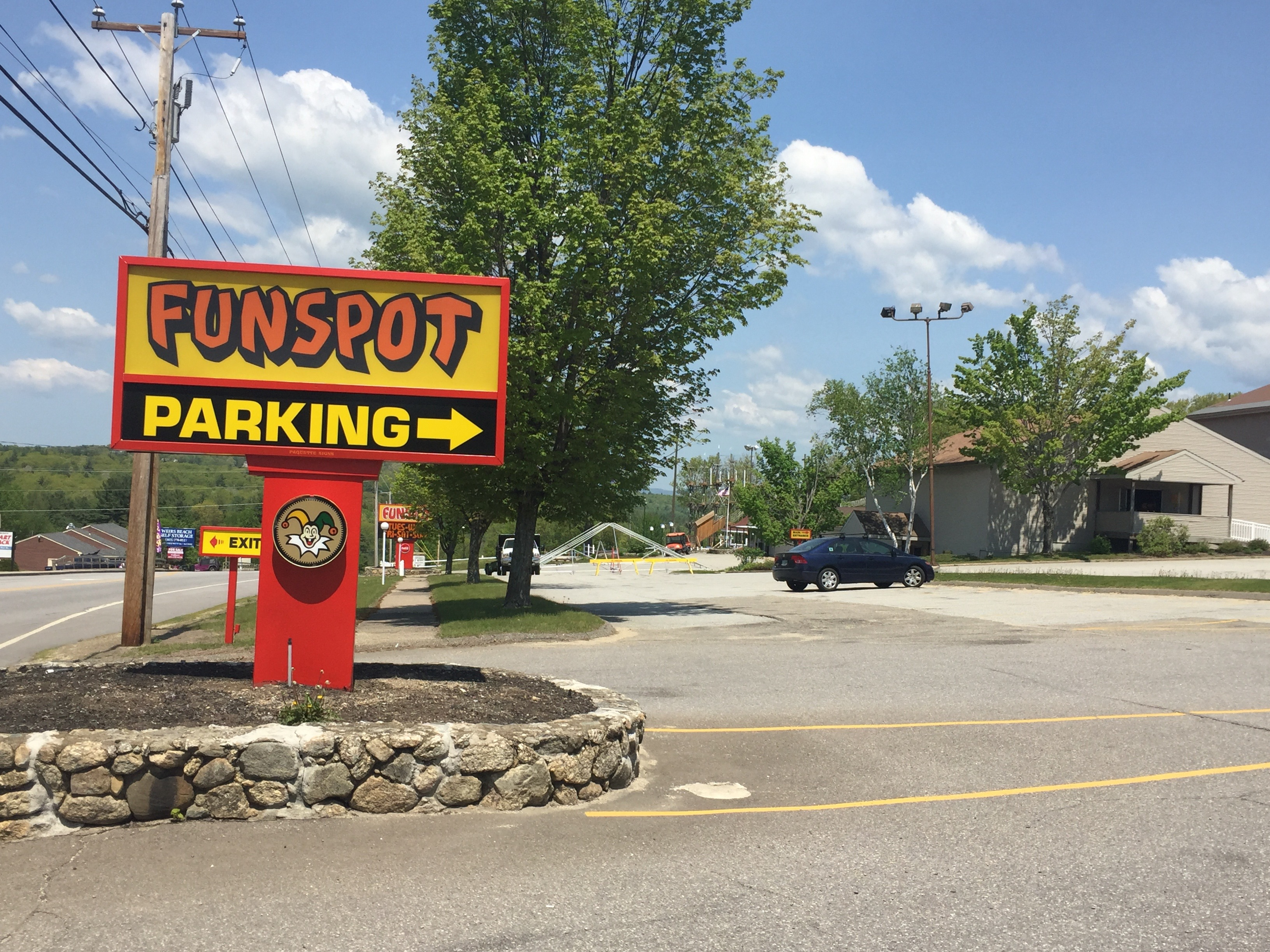
- Entrance to Funspot
- Former names: Weirs Sports Center

General information
- Type: Video arcade
- Location: 579 Endicott Street North, Weirs Beach, Laconia, New Hampshire, United States
- Opened: June 27, 1952
- Relocated: 1964

Website
- www.funspotnh.com

Funspot is an arcade which features one of the largest collections of early-1970s to late-2000s games in the world. It is located in the village of Weirs Beach in Laconia, New Hampshire, United States. Founded in 1952 by Robert M. Lawton, Funspot includes over 600 video games (both retro and modern), pinball machines, and ticket redemption machines; an indoor miniature golf course; 20-lane ten-pin and candlepin bowling; cash bingo; a restaurant; a tavern; kiddie rides; and several other attractions on its grounds.

Funspot was officially named the "Largest Arcade in the World" by Guinness World Records at the 10th Annual International Classic Video Game and Pinball Tournament, held from May 29 through June 1, 2008.

Originally called the Weirs Sports Center, which remains its legal business name according to a copyright notice on its official website, and located across the street from the Weirs Beach boardwalk, Funspot moved in 1964 to its current home on Route 3. There are over 350 games from the 1970s, 1980s, and 1990s on the floor at any one time in the American Classic Arcade Museum section of Funspot.

Funspot is home to The American Classic Arcade Museum, a separate 501(c)(3) non-profit organization located on the arcade's third floor, which seeks to preserve the history of coin-operated arcade games.

== History ==
Funspot first opened as the Weirs Sports Center on June 27, 1952, in the top floor of Tarlson's Arcade building across from the Weirs Beach boardwalk. It was opened by then 21-year-old Robert M. Lawton as an indoor miniature golf course and penny arcade with $750 USD borrowed from his grandmother. On the first day the center was open it made $36.60 from miniature golf admission and $5.60 from selling soft drinks. A round of 9-hole mini-golf cost 35 cents.

In 1964, Funspot was created when Lawton bought 21 acres (8.5 ha) of land, the same land where Funspot now sits, and moved his entertainment venture there. The first attraction built was a miniature golf course and an adjacent building. This course came to be known as the "Landmarks of New Hampshire" miniature golf course. A small clubhouse was also built next to the course, and in 1965 it was expanded into a 4,000-square-foot (370 m^{2}) billiards room. This was the first of several additions to Funspot.

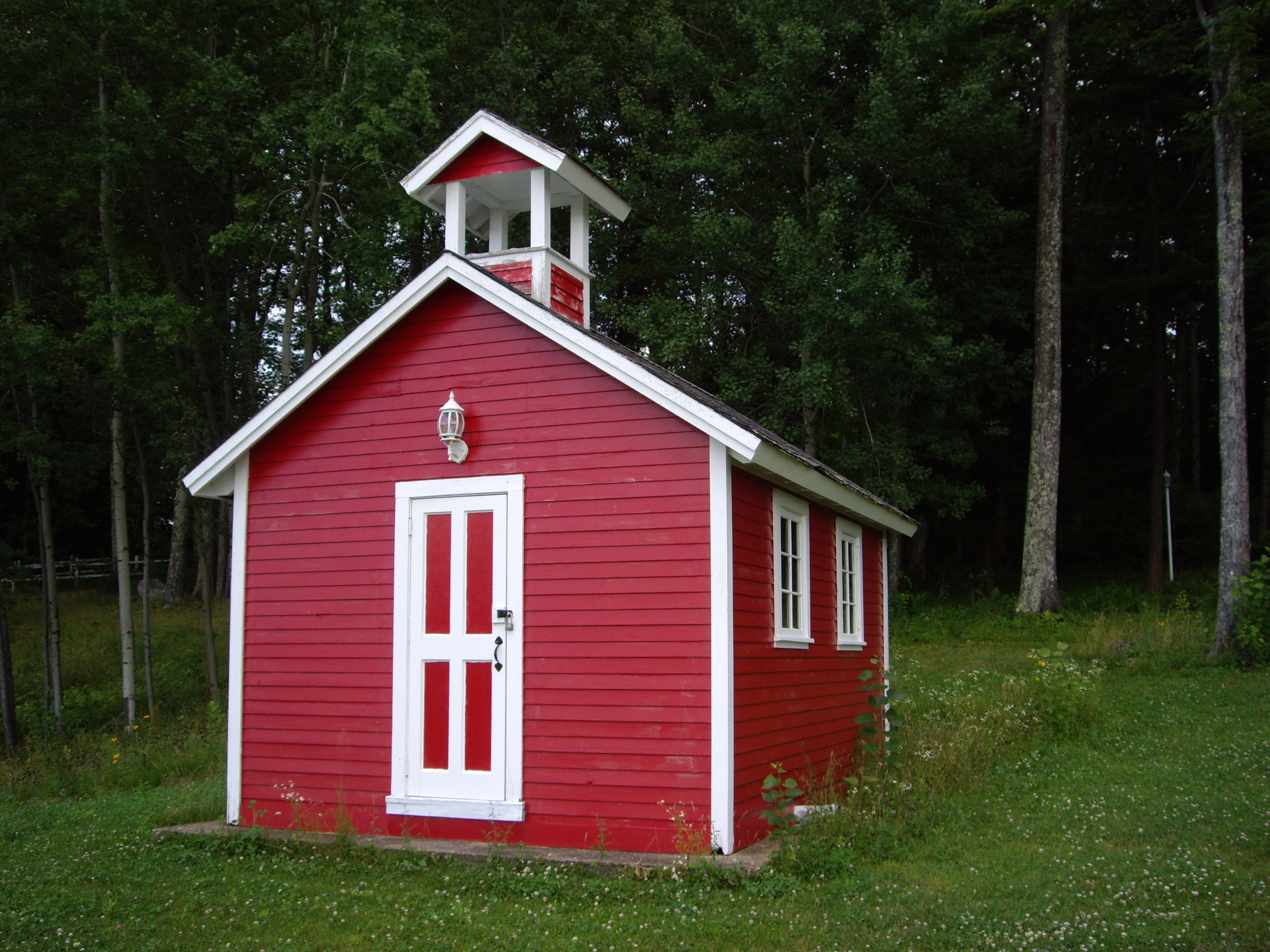
The school house from the former Storybook Forest theme park

In 1971, Funspot opened the first of two theme parks on its Route 3 campus. Named "Indian Village", it was described by the president of the American Indian Lore Association, Chief Red Dawn, in 1973 as, "A village of life-size habitats - reconstructed from historical blueprints, representing major Indian cultural areas of North America." Buildings ranged from a "Nookta Whaling Shrine," to a "Mandan Earth lodge," to "Plains Indians Teepees." Indian Village closed in 1983.

A second theme park, Storybook Forest, was opened in 1976. This park was themed after children's nursery rhymes and fairy tales. One of the main attractions in Storybook Forest was "Gingerbread Man Pond", a pond created in the shape of a running gingerbread man, with two large buttons. The buttons housed Robinson Crusoe's hut and cave. There were also multiple fiberglass sculptures of story characters that are still seen throughout the children's areas of Funspot. When Storybook Forest closed, all of the attractions were removed with the exception of the red school house.

In 1980, Funspot switched from quarters to tokens. Funspot expanded over the years, opening satellite locations in Wolfeboro, Concord, Dover, and Amherst in New Hampshire, as well as South Portland, Maine, and Port Richey, Florida. By the mid-1990s these satellite locations had closed one at a time, with the location in Florida being the last to close. It was transformed into another arcade, Stop N' Play, which is still open. The bowling center, featuring both ten-pin and candlepin, was added to Funspot in 1988, and the bingo hall was added in 1996.

Funspot was named "World's Largest Arcade" by Guinness World Records in 2008. One attraction in the building, the American Classic Arcade Museum, has approximately 180 pre-1988 video games and pinball machines. In 2015, the outdoor minigolf course was moved indoors to the third floor and is now open year-round. Robert M. Lawton said, "When we opened it in 1964, we were the only ones in the Lakes Region that had minigolf, but then several opened up. Last year, we decided we wouldn't close it and we were going to keep it. It's historic; the buildings are fantastic."

== American Classic Arcade Museum ==
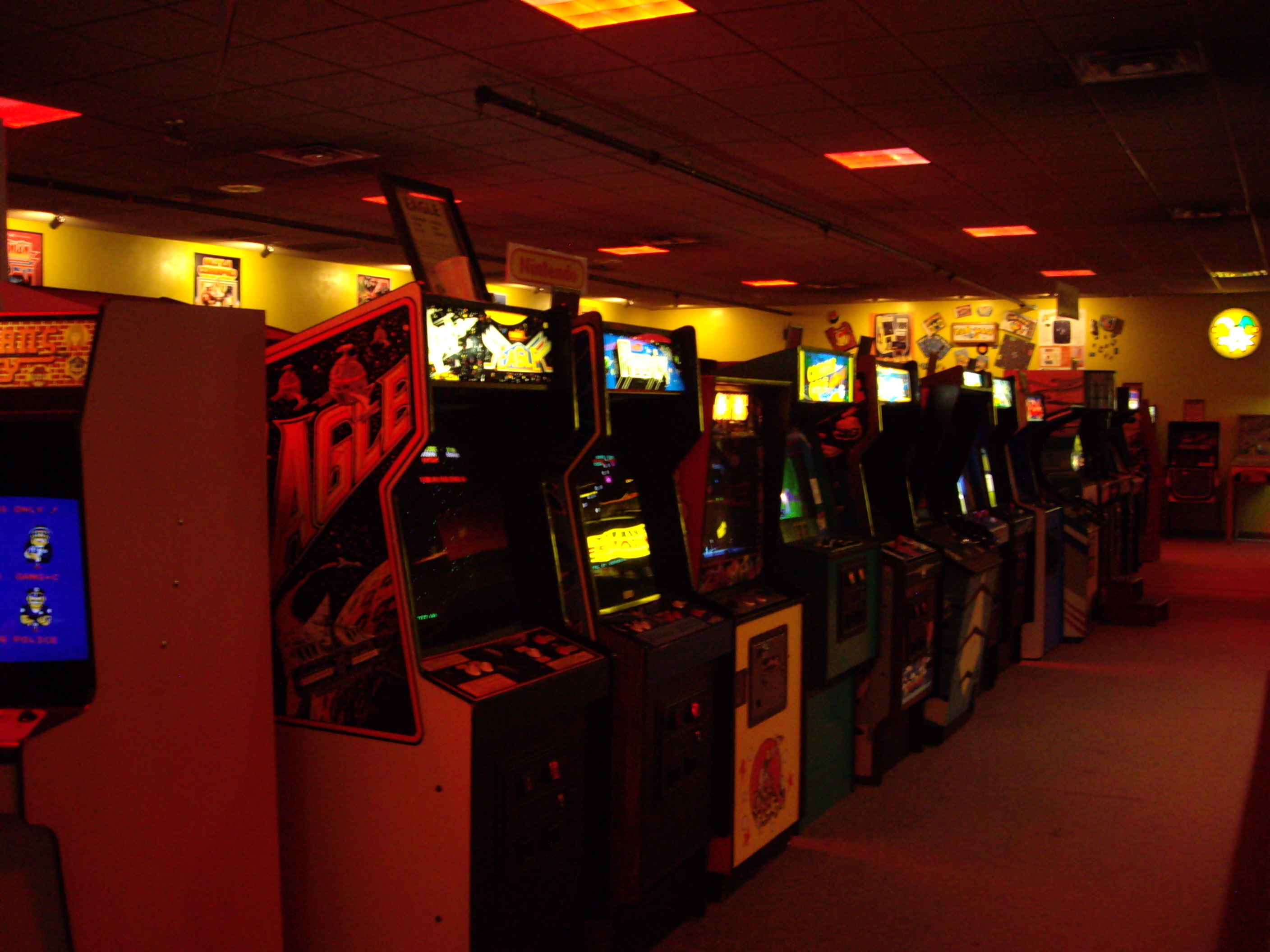
The American Classic Arcade Museum at Funspot

The third floor of Funspot houses the American Classic Arcade Museum.

Gary Vincent, an employee of Funspot and president and curator of the American Classic Arcade Museum, founded the 501(c)(3) nonprofit organization with the purpose of collecting classic games through donation to preserve the history of classic coin-op games and their history. Opened in the late 1990s, the American Classic Arcade Museum accepts donations of games built no later than 1989. Previously, the museum's date range extended only to 1987; when asked in a 2008 article why 1987 was picked as the cut-off date, Vincent replied that he felt that that was when the videogame industry was starting to change.

There are 250 games on the floor at any one time. Billy Baker of The Boston Globe called the museum "the Louvre of the '8-bit' world."

From 1999 to 2014, the American Classic Arcade Museum hosted the Annual Classic Videogame and Pinball Tournament, where people came from all over the world to try to beat records on the arcade games housed in the museum. Referees from Guinness World Records were on hand to verify the record attempts. At the 10th tournament alone, well over 20 records were set. Records have been set at the American Classic Arcade Museum by well-known gamers such as Billy Mitchell, Steve Wiebe, and Brian Kuh.

During the end of the 1980s, with the decline in interest in arcade games, Funspot started deaccessioning its games. Once the museum was founded, The American Classic Arcade Museum began looking to replace games that were popular back in the day. The museum purchases some on eBay and has many donated. Nonworking or partial games are often donated, and restoration work, sometimes years' worth, must be done to get them in working order.

The American Classic Arcade Museum has been featured in numerous online and print magazine articles and featured on segments of Boston Chronicle, New Hampshire Chronicle and season 23, episode 5 of Mysteries at the Museum. In 2008, the museum was closed for a week for the filming of "Altar of the Unnamed," a film based on a possessed video game, which was never completed. In 2007, portions of the documentary The King of Kong were filmed in the museum and other areas of Funspot.

== Symbols ==
Funspot took its name from a magazine titled the same that founder, Robert M. Lawton, read. Bob has stated, "I got the name from a magazine... When we asked them if we could use the name for our business, they said go right ahead." In 1965, the creator of the Archie comic series, Bob Montana, drew the jester that appears on every Funspot token. Montana, who resided in Meredith, New Hampshire, created the jester in the likeness of his character Jughead. Funspot's mascot is "Topsnuf" the dragon. "Topsnuf" is "Funspot" backwards.

== Additional ventures ==
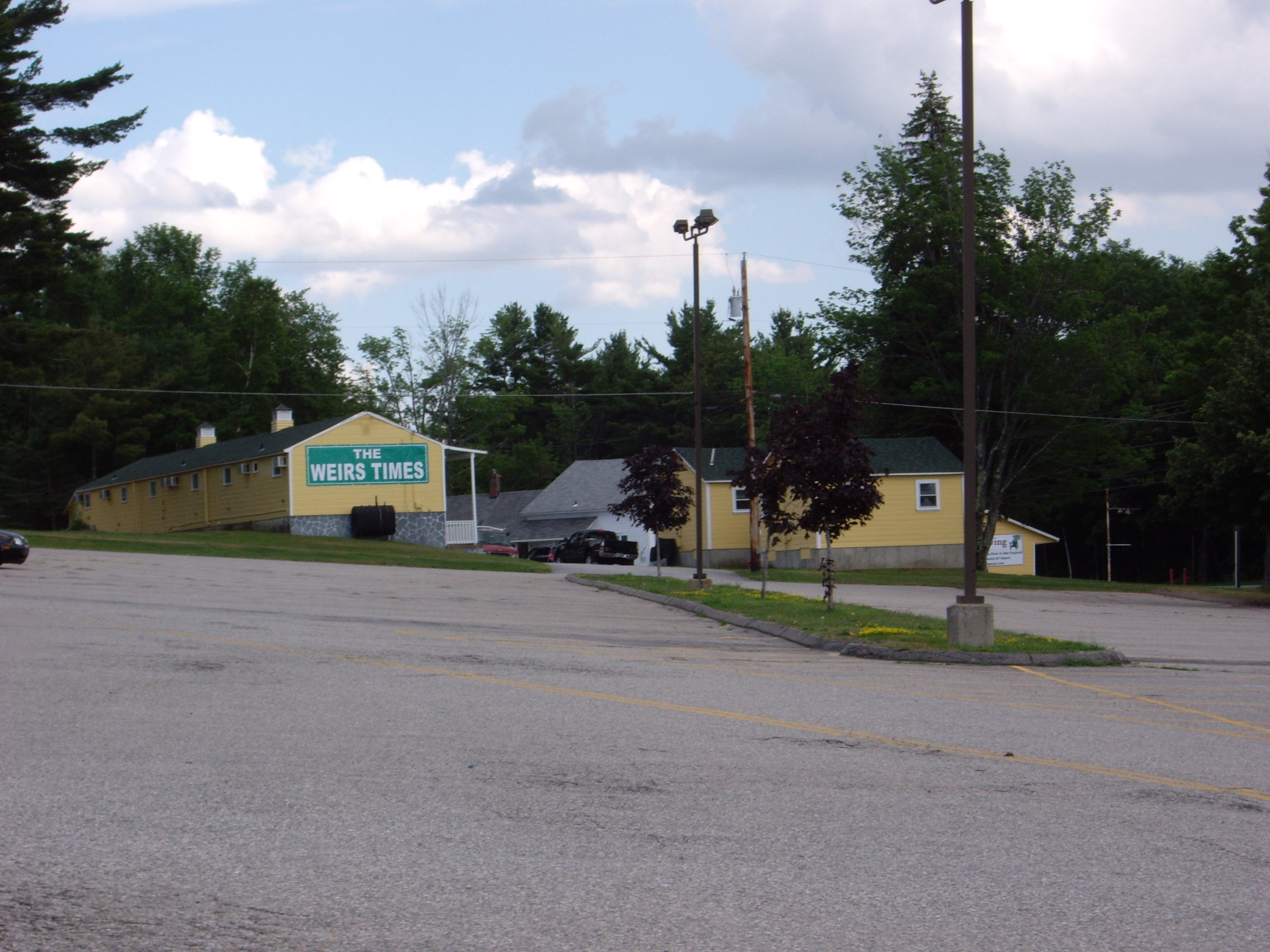
The Weirs Times building on Funspot's campus

Funspot's founder and former owner, Robert M. Lawton has launched other community ventures that are not associated with his family entertainment center. Records of Funspot's web site show that at least from 2006 to 2012, several of its charity bingo games each week—staffed in part by volunteers—have had one of the associated nonprofits as their beneficiary.

The Lake Winnipesaukee Historical Society and Lake Winnipesaukee Museum are an organization and museum building located on a separate property adjacent to Funspot. The historical society was founded by Funspot owner Robert M. Lawton and his son Tim Lawton in 1985. The museum houses information and exhibits on the history of Lake Winnipesaukee and the towns surrounding it. Many of the artifacts were found by Bob and Tim from scuba diving expeditions the two regularly made into the lake. The museum building was opened in 2004, and has been expanded to include a state of the art presentation area for guest lectures.

The Weirs Times is the second venture outside the realm of entertainment that Robert M. Lawton embarked upon. The original "Weirs Times and Tourist's Gazette" was published from 1883 until 1902. Robert M. Lawton started publishing a new weekly paper with the same masthead and map of Lake Winnipesaukee as the original paper in June 1992. Originally focused on the towns around Lake Winnipesaukee, the weekly publication has expanded to a weekly circulation of 30,000. The Weirs Times is known for devoting a large percent of its copy to Republican and Tea Party columnists and letters to the editor.

Funspot began hosting the Miss Winnipesaukee Scholarship Program in 1969 and did so for several years but is no longer a sponsor of program.
