= Jace Hall =

American actor

Jason "Jace" Hall is an American film, television and video game producer.

== Career ==
Hall was one of the founders of Monolith Productions and is CEO of record keeping platform Twin Galaxies. His music video "I Play W.O.W" was featured on IGN's YouTube channel, with over 18 million views as of 2025.

He starred, produced, and wrote The Jace Hall Show and served as the executive producer of the web series The Morning After, having previously done so on ABC's TV series V. He was also a producer of the machinima series Chadam.

In 2012, Hall teamed up with Debbie Gibson to record "Electric Youth Reloaded", an updated remix of Gibson's 1989 hit single.

In March 2014, Hall purchased Twin Galaxies, an organization dedicated to adjudicating and archiving video game high scores and achievements. He currently holds the position of CEO and caretaker of the Twin Galaxies organization.

In 2016, Hall became the new CEO of esports organization Echo Fox.

In 2018, Hall served as co-chairman of the H1Z1 Pro League, a professional esports league for the video game H1Z1, and a partnership between Twin Galaxies and Daybreak Games. In November 2018, the H1Z1 Pro League was cancelled after a significant decline in the game's playerbase negatively impacted league revenue, resulting in reports that teams failed to receive scheduled payments from the league. Hall responded to the reports, stating that the league intends to meet its obligations to the teams.
