= U.S. National Video Game Team =

American esports team

- Founded: July 1983; 43 years ago Ottumwa, Iowa, United States

The U.S. National Video Game Team (USNVGT) was an American esports team in the early 1980s. It was founded in July 1983 in Ottumwa, Iowa, United States by Walter Day and Jim Riley as part of the Electronic Circus tour, with Steve Sanders as the first captain. After the Circus folded, Day re-established the team with himself as the captain, taking the team on a bus tour. The team challenged the players of arcades across the country and attempted to challenge other countries through visits to foreign embassies. In the years that followed the team ran numerous competitive contests.

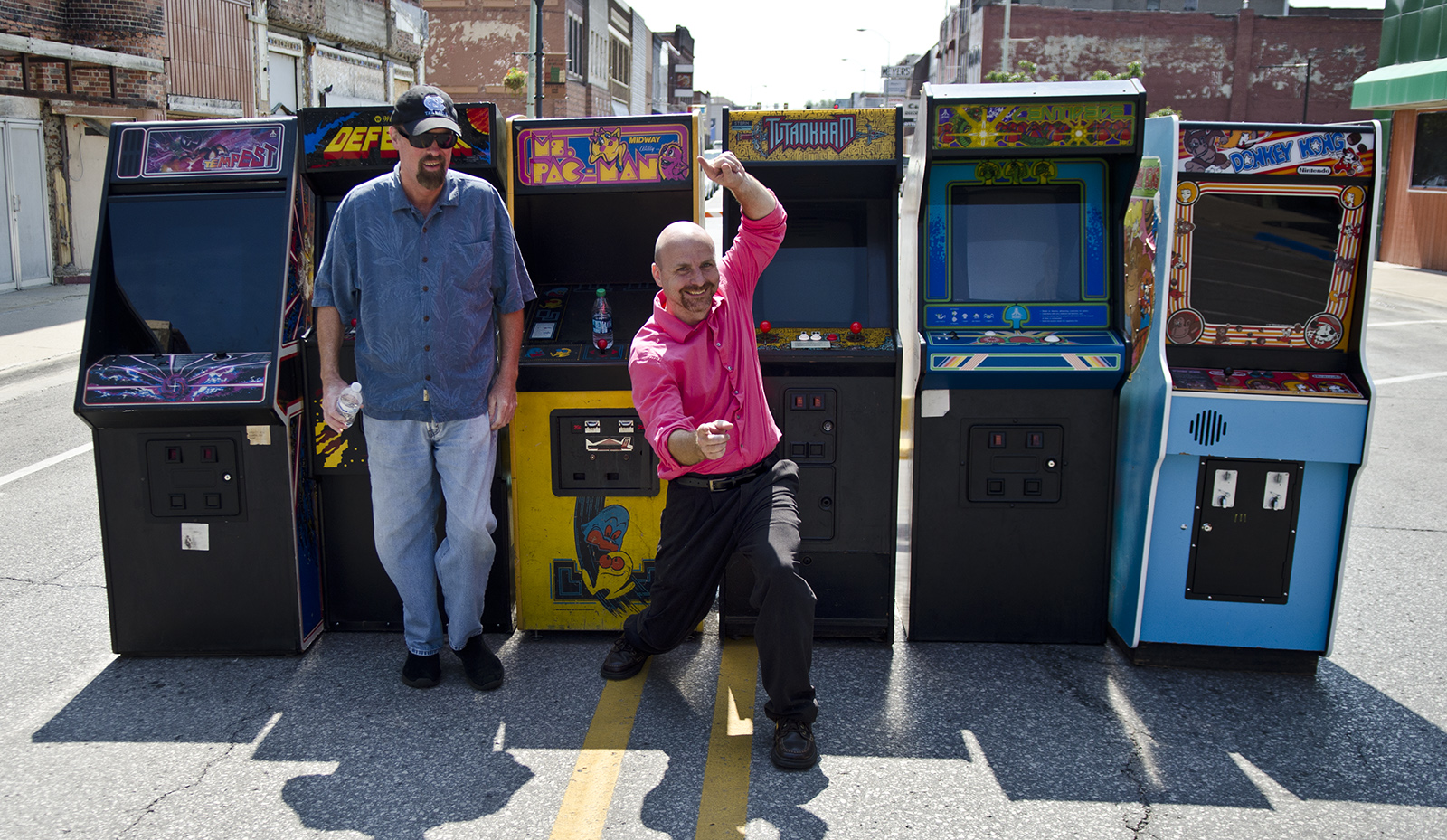
Mark Hoff outside the original Twin Galaxies arcade location in Ottumwa, Iowa in 2014

== History ==
- January 14, 1984: Working with the Twin Galaxies Intergalactic Scoreboard, the USNVGT conducted the 1984 Coronation Day to crown the 1983 players, manufacturers, and magazines of the past year.
- February 12, 1984: The U.S. National Video Game Team attends the February 1984 AMOA Expo in New Orleans, beginning a long tradition of reviewing new games for the video game industry.
- February 10–12, 1984: Canada-USA Video Game Team Conference is organized by USNVGT.
- The first annual U.S. National Video Game Team competition was held in 1985. Arcade video games at the competition included the fighting game Karate Champ (1984), the beat 'em up title Kung-Fu Master (1984), the run-and-gun shooter Commando (1985) and the sports video game Gridiron Fight (1985).
- April 8, 1986: The U.S. National Video Game Team is authorized by the Guinness Book of World Records to organize contests.
- In 1986, the USNVGT continued on without Day under Jeff Peters and Steve Harris with Donn Nauert as team captain. The team extended their reach to include publishing the Top Score Newsletter and Electronic Game Player Magazine a short time later. Nauert appeared in television commercials for the Atari 7800 and served as the referee for Incredible Sunday on That's Incredible!, a three-game competition on the Nintendo Entertainment System that served as a precursor to the Nintendo World Championships 1990.
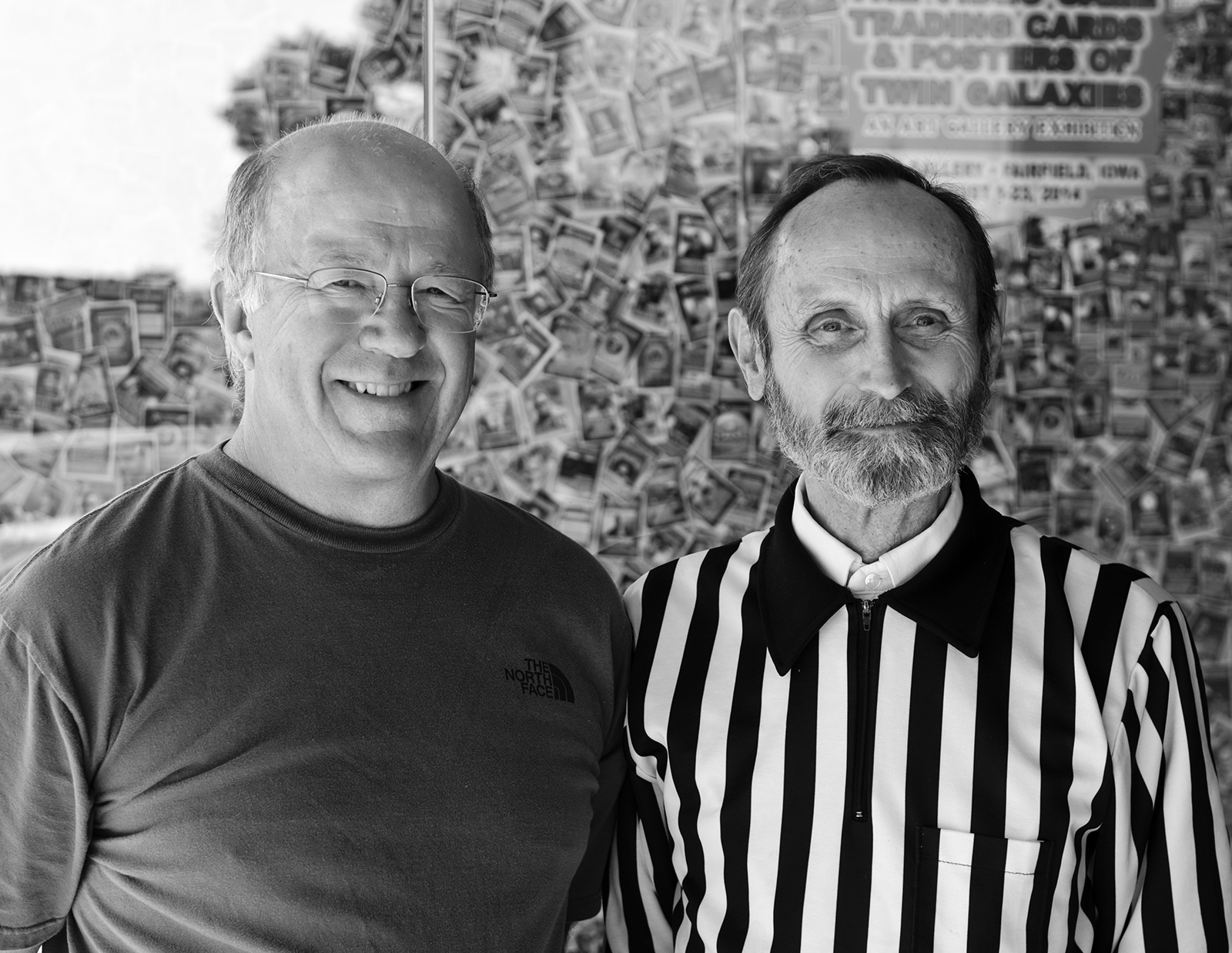
  Walter Day and his Business Partner from the early 1980s
- April 1, 1987: U.S. National Video Game Team Conducts 1987 Video Game Masters Tournament for Guinness.
- July 12, 1987; The U.S. National Video Game Team organizes the 1987 Video Game Masters Tournament for Guinness Record Book.
- 1991–1994: Every month Electronic Gaming Monthly (EGM), published a full-page high-score table titled "The U.S. National Video Game Team's International Scoreboard".

== U.S.National VideoGame Team Tournaments ==
In 2016, Lonnie McDonald won a USNVGT "cutthroat rules" Joust tournament on the game at the Let's Play Gaming Expo before defeating John Newcomer - the creator of the game - in a special live exhibition match.
