= Twin Galaxies =

Organization and social media platform

- Formation: November 10, 1981; 45 years ago
- Founder: Walter Day
- Founded at: Ottumwa, Iowa, US
- Purpose: Video game–oriented social media platform, news, competition, record keeping
- Headquarters: Beverly Hills, California, US
- Key people: Jace Hall (CEO); Rajat Sood
- Affiliations: Guinness World Records
- Website: www.twingalaxies.com

Twin Galaxies is a social media platform and video game database. Twin Galaxies is the official supplier of video game records to Guinness World Records.

== History ==
In mid-1981, Walter Day, founder of Twin Galaxies, Inc., visited more than 100 video game arcades over four months, recording the high scores that he found on each game.

On November 10, 1981, Day opened his arcade in Ottumwa, Iowa, naming it Twin Galaxies.

On February 9, 1982, Day's database of records was released publicly as the Twin Galaxies National Scoreboard.

Twin Galaxies' first event formed state teams from the top players in North Carolina and California, facing them off in a "California Challenges North Carolina All-Star Playoff". The teams played in 17 different games in Lakewood, California, and Wrightsville Beach, North Carolina. California defeated North Carolina 10–7 over the weekend of August 27–30, 1982.

In September, 1982, the book "Defending the Galaxy" is released—and declaring Twin Galaxies as the "Video Game Capital of the World", and describing the California/North Carolina contest just held.

On November 30, 1982, Ottumwa mayor Jerry Parker declared the town "Video Game Capital of the World", a claim that was backed up by Iowa Governor Terry Branstad, Atari and the Amusement Game Manufacturers Association in a ceremony at Twin Galaxies on March 19, 1983.

Beginning in the summer of 1982, Video Games magazine and Joystick published high-score tables taken from Twin Galaxies' data. Additional high-score charts also appeared in USA Today, Videogiochi (Milan, Italy), Computer Games, Video Game Player and Electronic Fun.

On January 8–9, 1983, Twin Galaxies organized its first world championship, which was filmed by ABC-TV's That's Incredible! and aired on February 21, 1983.

In March 1983, Twin Galaxies was contracted by the Electronic Circus to assemble a professional troupe of video game high-scorers. Though the Circus was scheduled to visit 40 cities in North America, its Boston inaugural performance lasted only five days, closing on July 19. The players selected by Twin Galaxies for the Circus are believed to be history's first professionally contracted video game players.

On July 25, 1983, Twin Galaxies established the first professional U.S. National Video Game Team. The USNVGT toured the United States during the summer of 1983 in a 44-foot GMC bus filled with arcade games, appearing at arcades around the nation and conducting the 1983 Video Game Masters Tournament, the results of which were published in the 1984 US edition of Guinness World Records.

In 1988, the Guinness Book of World records stopped publishing records from Twin Galaxies due to a decline in interest for arcade games.

On February 8, 1998, Twin Galaxies' Official Video Game & Pinball Book of World Records was published. It is a 984-page book containing scores compiled since 1981. A second edition was published as a three-volume set in 2007. A third edition was published in 2009.

Founder Walter Day left Twin Galaxies in 2010 to pursue a career in music, and since then ownership of Twin Galaxies has changed hands several times. In 2013, Twin Galaxies began charging a fee for score submissions.

In March 2014, Jace Hall announced that he was the new "Head Custodian and Caretaker of the TWIN GALAXIES organization". On April 28, 2014, the full Twin Galaxies website, including the high score database and forum content, came back online.

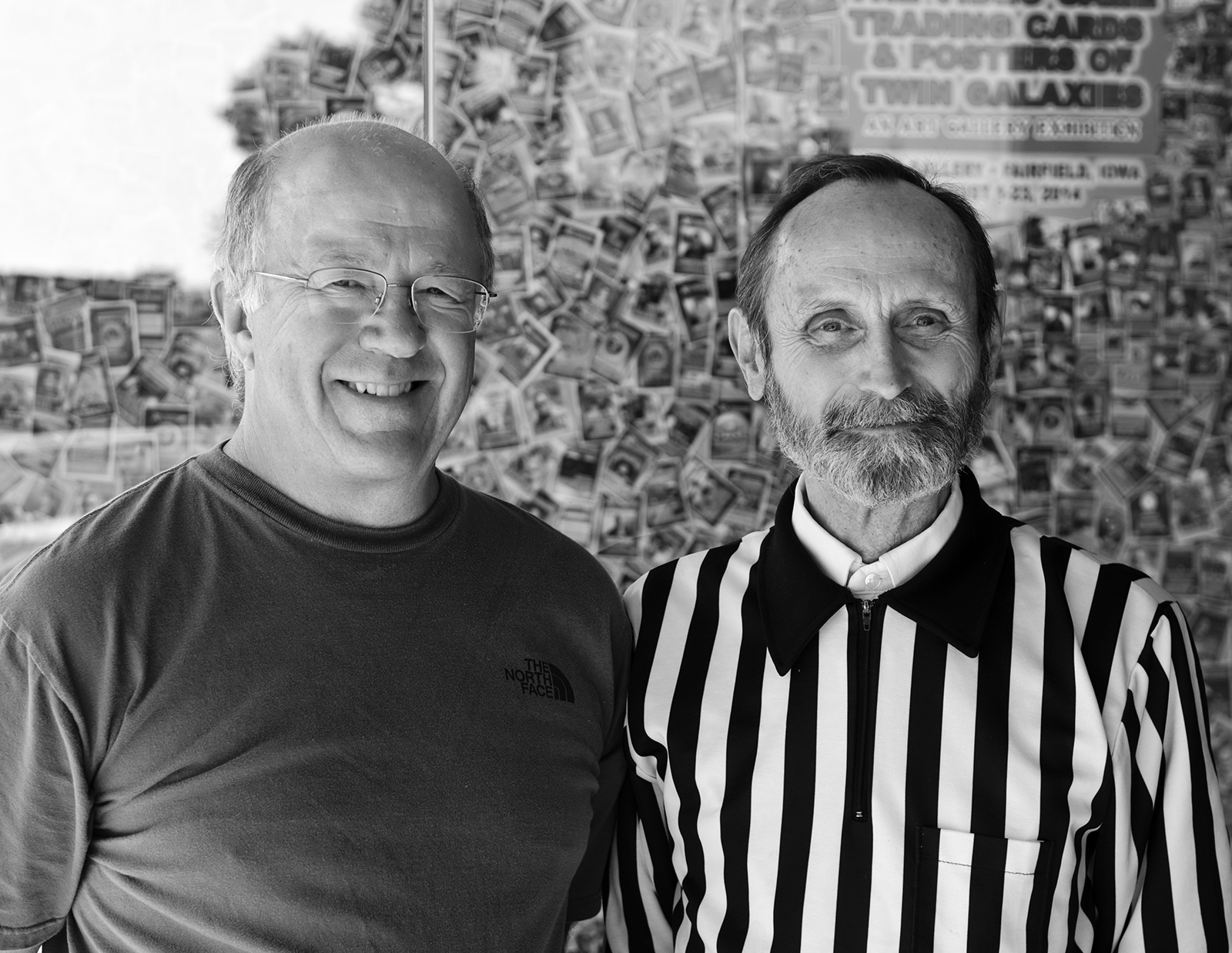
Walter Day (right) and his business partner from the early 1980s

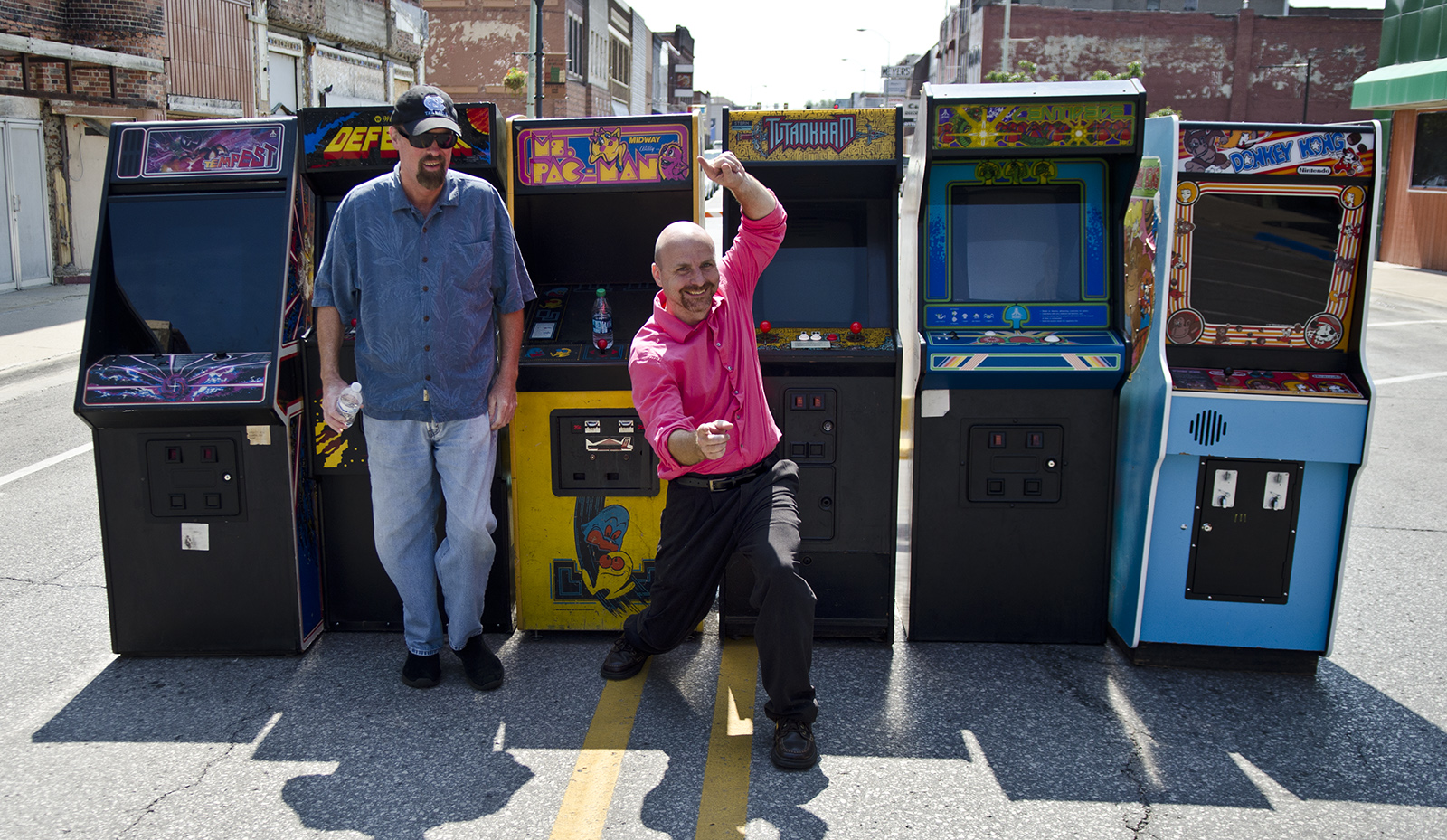
Mark Hoff (right) and Joel West

== US National Video Game Team ==
The US National Video Game Team was founded on July 25, 1983, in Ottumwa, Iowa, by Walter Day and the Twin Galaxies Intergalactic Scoreboard.

== Events ==
=== Video Game Film Festival ===
Twin Galaxies organized the first Video Game Film Festival on June 2, 2001, at the Funspot Family Fun Center in Weirs Beach, New Hampshire, as a vehicle to document the cultural impact that video games have exerted on society.

=== Console Video Game World Championships ===
Twin Galaxies conducted the first Console Video Game World Championship during Twin Galaxies' 1st Annual Twin Galaxies' Video Game Festival at the Mall of America in Bloomington, Minnesota, on the weekend of July 20–22, 2001. This event is also known as the Console Game World Championship and had originally been planned for March 24–25, 2001, at the Sheraton Dallas Brookhollow Hotel in Dallas, Texas, but was moved forward to the Mall of America event.

The second Console Video Game World Championship was held the weekend of July 12–14, 2002, at the 2nd Annual Twin Galaxies' Video Game Festival at the Mall of America.

=== Classic Video Game World Championship ===
Twin Galaxies conducted the first "Classic Video Game World Championship" on June 2–4, 2001, at the Funspot Family Fun Center in Weirs Beach, New Hampshire. The winner of this renewed video game contest was Dwayne Richard, with Donald Hayes coming in second place. This event was descended from the Coronation Day Championships that were conducted by Twin Galaxies in 1983, 1984, 1985, 1986, and 2000. The 2nd "Classic Video Game World Championship" was conducted on the weekend of June 30 – July 2, 2002. The winner was Dwayne Richard, with Donald Hayes again coming in second place.

In July 2001 and 2002, Twin Galaxies conducted the annual Twin Galaxies' Video Game Festivals at the Mall of America.

On August 15, 2005, Walter Day and the staff of Twin Galaxies led a contingent of US and UK video game players to Paris, where they delivered an eight-foot-tall (2.4 meters) proclamation that proposed a "London vs. Paris" Video Game Championship.

On September 24, 2005, the US National Video Game Team revived and formed a New England Chapter with Walter Day as the national team captain and David Nelson of Derry, New Hampshire, as the chapter captain.

=== Iron Man Contest ===
In the first week of July 1985, Twin Galaxies conducted the 1st Twin Galaxies Iron Man Contest. The goal of the Iron Man competition was simple: competitors had to continue playing their game for as long as they could. If anyone passed 100 hours, they would be awarded a $10,000 prize from the Sports Achievement Association.

The winner of the contest was 18-year-old James Vollandt, who carried his Joust game for 67½ hours. The game malfunctioned at around 58 hours, wiping out all of his 210 extra lives. However, he earned back forty of them. He left the game voluntarily with a record-breaking score of 107,216,700 points, a record that stood until 2010 when John McAllister broke the record over a live streaming video on justin.tv.

== Media ==
In 2007, a film about Twin Galaxies and video game champions released in the 1980s, Chasing Ghosts: Beyond the Arcade, was screened at the Sundance Film Festival.

The King of Kong: A Fistful of Quarters, a feature documentary about retro arcade gamers, and the competition between Billy Mitchell and Steve Wiebe, in which Walter Day and Twin Galaxies feature prominently, was released in theaters on August 24, 2007. The documentary was critical of Twin Galaxies' handling of challenges to long-established top scores and suggested that its organizational structure is rife with conflicts of interest.

Frag, a feature documentary about modern professional gamers, was released on DVD on August 1, 2008, by Cohesion Productions of Cedar Falls, Iowa. The first ten minutes of the documentary covered Twin Galaxies' role as the pioneers of organized video game playing back in the early 1980s.

Man vs Snake: The Long and Twisted Tale of Nibbler, a feature documentary about the video game Nibbler, was released worldwide in 2016. The film includes Twin Galaxies' history and the competition for high scores. Walter Day is featured throughout the film.

== Cheating controversies ==
Records by both Todd Rogers and Billy Mitchell were invalidated by Twin Galaxies after investigations determined that the scores were not genuine. Rogers was revealed to have entered fake records into the database either by himself or by his friend who was a referee at Twin Galaxies, whereas Mitchell was found to have used an emulator to reach certain scores despite claiming to have played on an original arcade machine, which is a violation of the Twin Galaxies rules.

== Poster gallery ==
Since August 1, 1982, Twin Galaxies has been producing stylized posters to document gaming events. Though the first dozen posters issued in the early 1980s had printing runs of 500–1,000 copies each, the posters created in later years have been issued as limited editions with only 20–24 copies produced.

== Twin Galaxies contests and events ==
| Date | Title | Venue | Location |
|---|---|---|---|
| April 3–4, 1982 | National Defender Championship | 33 Arcades across America | Nationwide |
| August 27–30, 1982 | California Challenges North Carolina | Light Years Amusement/Phil's Family Fun Ctr. | Wrightsville Beach, NC/Lakewood, CA |
| January 8–9, 1983 | North America Video Game Olympics | Twin Galaxies/"ABC-TV's "That's Incredible" | Ottumwa, IA |
| August 24–28, 1983 | 1983 North American Video Game Challenge | 8 Cities Across America | Lake Odessa, MI/Omaha, NE/Chicago, IL/San Jose, CA/Seattle, WA |
| January 14, 1984 | 1984 Coronation Day Championship | Twin Galaxies | Ottumwa, IA |
| January 12–13, 1985 | 1985 Coronation Day Championship | Captain Video | Los Angeles, CA |
| April 19–20, 1997 | 1997 Video Game & Pinball Masters Tournament | 12 Cities | Fairfield, IA/Wilmington, NC/Edmonton, AB, Canada/Voorhees, NJ/St. Louis, MO/Kansas City, MO |
| June 27, 1998 | Crowning the Superstars of Mobile, Alabama | Cyberstation Arcade, Springdale Mall | Mobile, AL |
| August 22, 1998 | Crowning the Videogame Superstars of Tulsa, Oklahoma | Funhouse | Tulsa, OK |
| August 29, 1998 | Crowning the Videogame Superstars of St. Louis, MO | Exhilirama Arcade | St. Louis, MO |
| August 29, 1998 | Crowning the Videogame Superstars of Hattiesburg, Mississippi | Cyberstation Arcade | Hattiesburg, MS |
| January 30–31, 1999 | Chicagoland Arcade Championship | Friar Tuck's Arcade | Calumet City, IL |
| July 10, 1999 | National Family Fun Day | 28 States Across America | Nationwide |
| July 29–30, 2000 | Classic Gaming Expo 2000 | Plaza Hotel, Las Vegas, NV | Las Vegas, NV |
| September 25 - October 20, 2000 | Unreal Tournament Championship | Online Competition | International |
| Nov. 20 - Dec. 20, 2000 | Official Tony Hawk Pro 2 World Championship | Home-Based Submissions | International |
| January 1 - March 7, 2001 | Space Empires IV World Championship | Online Submissions | International |
| May 3 - July 2, 2001 | Crazy Taxi World Championship | Home-Based Submissions | International |
| July 20–22, 2001 | 1st Twin Galaxies' Video Game Festival | Mall of America | Bloomington, MN |
| May 18, 2002 | Save the Pak Mann Arcade | Pak Mann Arcade | Pasadena, CA |
| May 30 - June 2, 2002 | 2nd Classic Video Game World Championship | Funspot Family Fun Center | Weirs Beach, NH |
| July 12–14, 2002 | 2nd Twin Galaxies' Video Game Festival | Mall of America | Bloomington, MN |
| November 12–19, 2005 | November Hi-Score Jamboree at Funspot | Funspot Family Fun Center | Weirs Beach, NH |
| December 2–4, 2005 | Legends of the Golden Age | Totally Amused | Humble, TX |
| April 6–9, 2006 | Toughest Gun in the Dodge City | Apollo Amusements | Pompano Beach, FL |
| April 28–30, 2006 | 2006 Video Game & Pinball Masters Tournament | Pinball Hall of Fame | Las Vegas, NV |
| September 16, 2006 | Grand Rapids Nintendo DS Championship | Ultimate LAN Experience | Grand Rapids, MI |
| November 10–18, 2007 | 5 November Hi-Score Jamboree at Funspot | Funspot Family Fun Center | Weirs Beach, NH |
| March 5, 2008 | Steve Wiebe Attempts Donkey Kong World Record | MIX08 Event | Las Vegas, NV |
| July 17, 2008 | Steve Wiebe Donkey Kong Record Attempt | Twiistup 4 Technology event | Santa Monica, CA |
| August 2, 2008 | Nintendo Wii Shootout | Ultimate LAN Experience | Grand Rapids, MI |
| June 12–14, 2009 | Steve Wiebe Donkey Kong World Record attempt and Walter Day presented inaugural Twin Galaxies Hall of Fame Ceremony | Northwest Pinball and Gameroom Show | Seattle, WA |

== See also ==
- Time attack
- Speedrun
