= Walter Day =

American video game referee

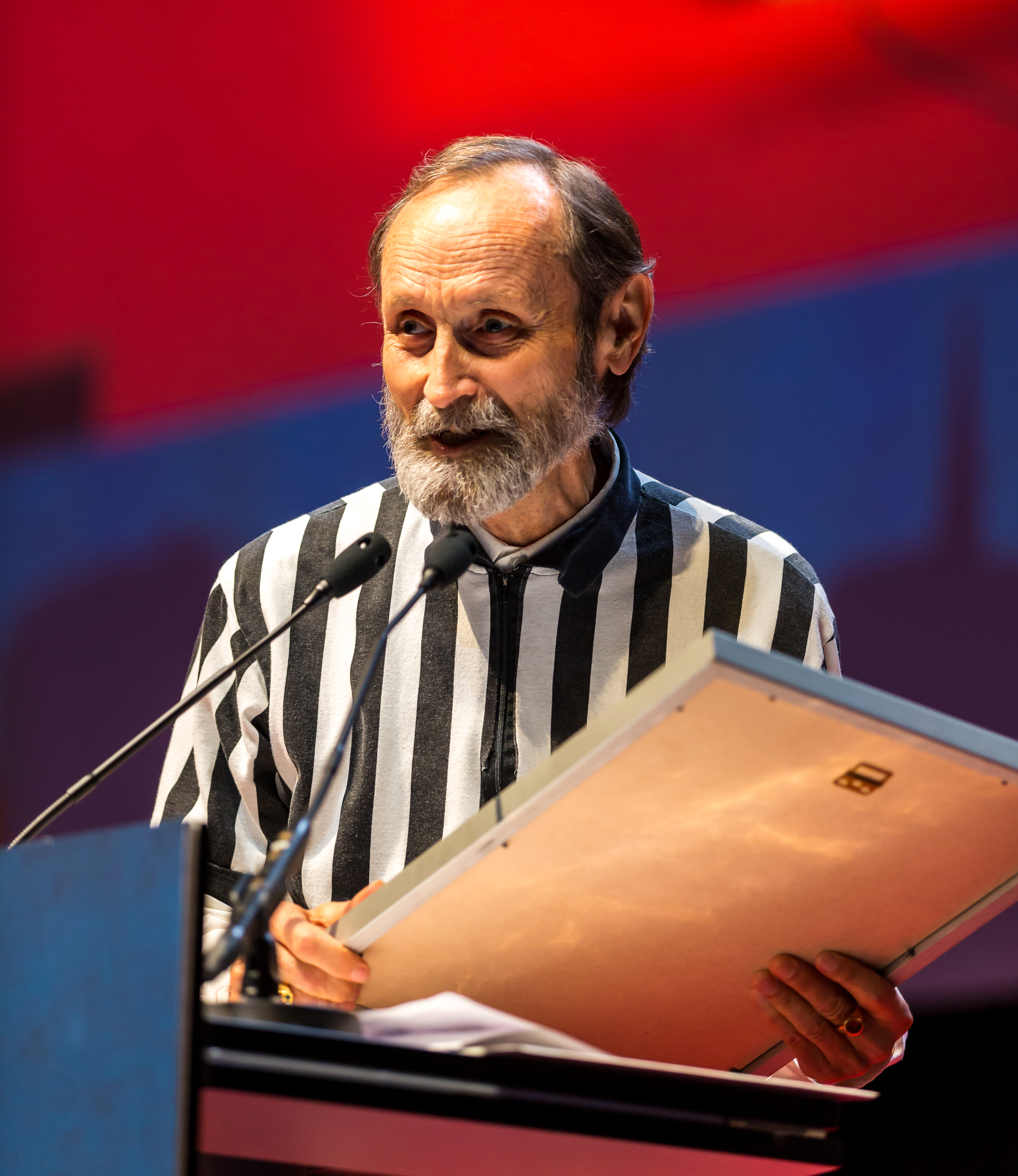
- Walter Day at Worldcon in Helsinki 2017
- Born: Walter Aldro Day Jr. May 14, 1949 (age 77); Oakland, California, U.S.
- Occupations: Video game referee and scorekeeper
- Years active: 1981–2010; 2010–present (musician)
- Known for: Twin Galaxies
- Title: Founder
- Website: https://thewalterdaycollection.com/

Walter Aldro Day Jr. (born May 14, 1949) is an American businessman and the founder of Twin Galaxies, an organization that tracks world records for video games and conducts a program of electronic-gaming promotions.

== Biography ==
Walter Aldro Day Jr. was born in Oakland, California, on May 14, 1949.

After moving to the town of Fairfield, Iowa, Day sold commemorative newspapers for a living. In 1980, Day went to Houston, Texas to become an oil futures trader. He soon moved back to Fairfield and became a landlord, purchasing the Twin Galaxies arcade in Ottumwa, Iowa in 1981. That same year, he appeared on the cover of Time in an edition featuring video games, and he established an online platform to establish rules and compile records for competitive video game playing. Twin Galaxies soon became known as the trusted database for high score records.

Beginning in 1983, Guinness World Records recognized video games as a new category. Twin Galaxies became the official supplier of verified scores. Day was designated as an assistant editor in charge of video game scores for the 1984 to 1986 editions. At the opening of the 2017 Hugo Awards ceremony, Day presented a Guinness Record recognizing the Hugo Award as the longest-running science fiction award.

Day has appeared in documentary films including Icon (2002), Coin-Op TV (2007), Chasing Ghosts: Beyond the Arcade (2007), The King of Kong: A Fistful of Quarters (2007), Frag (2008), The Video Craze (2013), Gamer Age (2014), The King of Arcades (2014), Nintendo Quest (2015), and Man vs Snake (2015).

Day left Twin Galaxies in May 2010 to pursue a career in music.
