= Boulder International Film Festival =

American film festival

- Location: Boulder, Colorado, United States
- Language: International
- Website: http://www.biff1.com

The Boulder International Film Festival (BIFF) is held annually in March in Boulder, Colorado. BIFF features films by new and emerging filmmakers, as well as industry directors, writers, producers, and actors. There are 25,000 attendances annually.

== History ==
The Colorado Film Society (CFS) was founded by filmmakers and sisters Kathy and Robin Beeck. The CFS became a 501C3 nonprofit organization in May of 2004. In 2005, the CFS launched the Boulder International Film Festival, implemented an educational outreach program, and partnered with many nonprofits. In the years since, with a team of 500 volunteers, the CFS initiated a Call2Action Program which has included 175 nonprofit organizations, a Senior Outreach Program, a Youth Program and Teen Short Film Competition, a Singer/Songwriter Showcase, an Adventure Pavilion, a film program at Longmont's Stewart Auditorium, and a popular CineCHEF event during the Festival.

=== 2005 ===
The festival's inaugural season showcased more than 50 films from around the world. Among the highlights were documentaries such as Seoul Train, Mardi Gras: Made in China and The Liberace of Baghdad, the regional premiere of Danny Boyle's Millions, a short by Jason Reitman, and The Real Old Testament, from Curtis and Paul Hannum.

=== 2006 ===
Special guest artists during BIFF 2006 included Maria Bello, Patrick Warburton, Eric Roberts and screenwriter Amy Fox. Director Andrew Quigley received a Special Jury Prize for his documentary Diameter of the Bomb.

=== 2007 ===
BIFF 2007's guests included filmmaking duo Michael and Mark Polish, screenwriter John August, the Denver Slam Poetry Team, and a contingent of air-guitar masters, the latter in conjunction with the documentary Air Guitar Nation.

=== 2008 ===
BIFF 2008 included Helen Hunt's directorial debut, And Then She Found Me, Alex Gibney's Taxi to the Dark Side, which won the Oscar shortly thereafter; concertizing by local performers including Hazel Miller and Otis Taylor; an offsite showing of Alexander Nevsky, accompanied by the Boulder Philharmonic Orchestra playing the original score; and a closing night featuring the documentary Stranded: I've Come from a Plane That Crashed on the Mountains.

=== 2009 ===
Chevy Chase opened the 2009 Festival at the Boulder Theater. Chase received an Award of Excellence in Comedy which was followed by a film retrospective honoring his work. Chase participated in a Q&A session hosted by BIFF executive producer Ron Bostwick. That year, BIFF was voted one of the “25 Coolest Film Festivals” MovieMaker Magazine.

=== 2010 ===
Closing Night of BIFF 2010 was a tribute to Alec Baldwin, which included a film retrospective of his work followed by a question and answer session hosted by Ron Bostwick. Three weeks following BIFF, Baldwin co-hosted the 2010 Academy Awards ceremony with his It's Complicated co-star Steve Martin.

=== 2011 ===
BIFF 2011 featured guest stars Oliver Stone and James Franco. Other features included the festive opening-night feature "Troubadors", a showing of The Last Circus, an examination of the controversial legacy of Chogyam Trungpa Rinpoche in Crazy Wisdom, a look into film preservation in These Amazing Shadows, and a showing of Freedom Riders. After Freedom Riders, BIFF had a post-screening conversation with John Lewis.

=== 2012 ===
William H. Macy and Martin Sheen were honored at the 2012 BIFF, with both actors participating in a Q&A session. Producer Anthony Bregman and screenwriter Lawrence Kasdan were also honorary guests.

=== 2013 ===
Peter Fonda was BIFF's closing-night guest in 2013. BIFF partnered with educational outreach programs such as the Youth Pavilion, CU @ BIFF (BIFF's college-level program in association with the University of Colorado), and expanded workshops and panels.

=== 2014 ===
Shirley MacLaine received the Career Achievement Award during her tribute at BIFF in 2014. For the first time, BIFF's fundraising FOOVIE (food and a movie) sold out and raised $15,000 for year-round BIFF programming. In addition, 2014 saw the release of an open-source Call 2 Action Toolkit that film festivals across the globe can use to adopt the festival's Call 2 Action program, joining the movement to harness the power of film for positive social change. Nathaniel Rateliff appeared at BIFF after his film Austin to Boston.

=== 2018 ===
The four-day festival featured 72 films and 14 programs, including a screening of Borg vs McEnroe, as well as a Denver vs. Boulder CineCHEF. In addition, BIFF had a special screening of Humor Me with Elliott Gould, an Augmented Reality film program, a Virtual Reality Pavilion, and a Singer/Songwriter Showcase.

Josh Walker, Rodes Rollins and Dallas Thornton performed at the 2018 BIFF Singer-Songwriter Showcase in Boulder, Colorado.

=== 2019 ===
BIFF 2019 was held from February 28 to March 3. The four-day festival featured 24,200 attendances, 55 films and three celebrity red carpet events which included David Crosby, Emilio Estevez, and Jakob Dylan.

=== 2020 ===
BIFF 2020 featured 88 films from 24 countries, a new Adventure Film Pavilion, an XR Experience, and the CineCHEF foodie competition. International Women's Day fell on festival weekend, Sunday, March 8th. There were over 20,000 attendances for BIFF 2020.

Robbie Robertson was in-person on Opening Night for a Q&A after the film Once Were Brothers: Robbie Robertson and the Band; Jesse Eisenberg made a special appearance on the red carpet with a Q&A after the screening of the film Resistance; and Jeff Orlowski discussed The Social Dilemma. In addition, Cheryl Strayed appeared at the Adventure Film Pavilion. BIFF hosted two Disney Animation executives at the XR Experience.

The COVID-19 pandemic closed down the country shortly after the 2020 Festival. Because of this, BIFF started a Drive–In Theater at the Boulder Airport in place of a traditional gathering. The Drive In featured local musicians, who gave live performances. BIFF offered free car passes for low-income families and collaborated with the city of Boulder on the drive-in screening.

=== 2021 ===
BIFF moved the festival from March to June for 2021 due to the COVID-19 pandemic. The pandemic did not stop BIFF itself, which continued to see attendance. Many events sold out, including the first in-person screening of Summer of Soul, the Closing Night film Mission: Joy – Finding Happiness in Troubled Times directed by Louie Psihoyos, and Roadrunner: A Film About Anthony Bourdain directed by Morgan Neville, who received the Career Achievement Award in Documentary Filmmaking at the screening.

=== 2022 ===
The Boulder International Film Festival 2022 was March 3-6 and featured 18,000 attendances, 55 films, 40 filmmakers and subjects, a sold-out CineCHEF event, a free Singer/Songwriter Showcase, the BIFF at Home! virtual film program, and appearances by Javier Bardem and Alec Baldwin.

=== 2023 ===
BIFF 2023 was March 2-5 and featured 67 films, 45 filmmakers, a CineCHEF event, a free Singer/Songwriter Showcase, a virtual cinema platform, the BIFF at Home! virtual program, a celebrity appearance by Oscar-winning actor F. Murray Abraham, and nearly 20,000 attendances.

=== 2024 ===
The 20th anniversary of BIFF was Feb 29-March 3, 2024 and featured appearances by award-winning actors Tony Goldwyn and Laura Linney. In honor of the festival's 20th anniversary, BIFF provided free virtual films pre-BIFF and hosted a Free Community Day during the Festival on Saturday, March 2, at eTown Hall, with free in person screenings of five award-winning films from BIFF's first 20 years.

== Festival Winners ==
BIFF 2022

| Category | Winner |
|---|---|
| Outstanding Performer of the Year | Javier Bardem |
| Best Feature Film | Mediterraneo: The Law of the Sea |
| Best Feature Documentary | Bernstein's Wall |
| Best Music Documentary | Stay Prayed Up |
| Best Adventure Feature Film | Exposure |
| Best Adventure Short Film | Learning to Drown |
| Best Short Film | On My Mind |
| Best Animated Short Film | Yellowstone 88–Song of Fire |
| Best Documentary Short Film | 1-2-3 The Len Barry Story |
| BIFF Impact Award | Refuge |
| Peoples Choice Award - Short Film | Breaking Trail |
| Peoples Choice Award - Feature Length Film | This is [Not] Who We Are |
| CinneChef | Linda Hamsten Fox, The Bindery |

BIFF 2021

| Category | Winner |
|---|---|
| Career Achievement Award in Documentary Filmmaking | Morgan Neville |
| Best Short Documentary | Welcome Strangers |
| Best Short Film | The Present |
| Impact | US Kids |
| Best Adventure Film | Godspeed, Los Polacos! |
| Best Music Film | Summer of Soul (…Or, When the Revolution Could Not Be Televised) |
| Best Documentary | Tom Petty, Somewhere You Feel Free |
| Best Feature Film | Asia |
| Peoples Choice Award - Short Film | The Incredible Lamont |
| Peoples Choice Award - Feature Length Film | Godspeed, Los Polacos! |
| BIFF Service Award | Jim Palmer |

BIFF 2020

| Category | Winner |
|---|---|
| Best Cinechef | Becca Henry Executive Chef, ChoLon Modern Asian – Stapleton |
| Best Short Documentary | LIV |
| Best Short Film | Nefta Football Club |
| Best Animated Short Film | The Bird and the Whale |
| Best Adventure Short | 8000+ |
| Best Social Impact Film | The Social Dilemma |
| Best Documentary | I Am Not Alone |
| Best Feature Film | The Personal History of David Copperfield |
| Peoples Choice Award - Short Film | LIV |
| Peoples Choice Award - Feature Length Film | I Am Not Alone |
| GRAND JURY PRIZE BEST SHORT FILM $3,000 | Nefta Football Club |
| GRAND JURY PRIZE FEATURE LENGTH FILM $10,000 | Once Were Brothers: Robbie Robertson and the Band |

BIFF 2019

| Category | Winner |
|---|---|
| Best Cinechef | Linda Hampsten Fox from The Bindery |
| Best Cinechef City | Denver |
| Best Short Documentary | Little Fiel |
| Best Short Film | Fauve |
| Best Animated Short Film | Hybrids |
| Best Call2Action Film | The Weight of Water |
| Best Music Documentary | David Crosby: Remember My Name |
| Best Documentary | Biggest Little Farm |
| Best Feature Film | Styx |
| Peoples Choice Award - Short Film | The Encirclement |
| Peoples Choice Award - Feature Length Film | Skid Row Marathon |
| GRAND JURY PRIZE BEST SHORT FILM $3,000 | Little Fiel |
| GRAND JURY PRIZE FEATURE LENGTH FILM $10,000 | Biggest Little Farm |

BIFF 2018

| Category | Winner |
|---|---|
| Best Cinechef | 24 Carrot Bistro |
| Best Documentary | Becoming Who I Was |
| Best Feature Film | The Insult |
| Best Animated Short Film | Garden Party |
| Best Call2Action Film | The Devil We Know |
| Best Music Documentary | 40 Years in the Making: The Magic Music Movie |
| Best Live Action Short Film | The Peculiar Abilities of Mr. Mahler |
| Peoples Choice Award - Short Film | Watu Wote (All of Us) |
| Peoples Choice Award - Feature Length Film | Won't You Be My Neighbor? |

BIFF 2017

| Category | Winner |
|---|---|
| Best Cinechef | 24 Carrot Bistro |
| Best New Filmmaker | Score: A Film Music Documentary |
| Best Documentary Short Film | DoDo's Delight |
| Best Short Film | Nocturne In Black |
| Best Call2Action Film | Chasing Coral |
| Best Music Documentary | Rumble: The Indians Who Rocked The World |
| Best Documentary | Chasing Coral |
| Best Feature Film | Glory |
| Peoples Choice Award - Short Film | La Femme et la TGV |
| Peoples Choice Award - Feature Length Film | Chasing Coral |

BIFF 2015

| Category | Winner |
|---|---|
| Career Achievement Award | Alan Arkin |
| Best Cinechef | Bradford Heap, Chef, Salt the Bistro and Colterra |
| Best Documentary Short Film | Our Curse |
| Best Short Film | Orbit Ever After |
| Best Music Documentary | Austin to Boston |
| Catalyst Award | Racing Extinction |
| Best Documentary | Call Me Lucky |
| Best Feature Film | A Borrowed Identity |
| Best Animated Film | Home |
| Grand Prize | Being Evel |
| Peoples Choice Award | Lion |

BIFF 2014

| Category | Film | Director |
|---|---|---|
| People's Choice Award | Keep On Keepin' On (a work-in-progress) | Alan Hicks |
| Best Feature Film | Le Week-End | Roger Michell |
| Best Documentary | Finding Vivian Maier | John Maloof and Charlie Siskel |
| Catalyst Award | Alive Inside | Michael Rosato-Bennett |
| Best Short Film | Saturday Girls | Emilie Cherpitel |
| Special Jury Award for Documentary Film | Mistaken for Strangers | Tom Berninger |
| Best Colorado Film | High and Hallowed: Everest 1963 | David Morton and Jake Norton |
| Best Call 2 Action Film | Documented | Jose Antonio Vargas |
| Best New Filmmaker | Keep On Keepin' On (a work-in-progress) | Alan Hicks |
| Best Editing | No No: A Dockumentary | Jeffrey Radice |

BIFF 2013

| Category | Film | Director |
|---|---|---|
| Best Short Film | Asad | Brian Buckley |
| Best Documentary Short | Open Heart | Kief Davidson |
| Best Call 2 Action Film | The Last Ocean | Peter Young |
| Best Documentary | Little World | Marcel Barrena |
| Best Feature Film | Blancanieves | Pablo Berger |
| Best Adventure Film | The Summit | Nick Ryan |
| People's Choice Award | Rising from the Ashes | TC Johnstone |
| Grand Prize | Muscle Shoals | Greg "Freddy" Camalier |

BIFF 2012

| Category | Film | Director(s) |
|---|---|---|
| Best Short Film | A Finger, Two Dots, Then Me | Daniel Holechek, David M. Holechek |
| Best Documentary Short | Incident in New Baghdad | James Spione |
| Best Call 2 Action Film | High Ground | Michael Brown |
| Best Documentary | Wild Horse, Wild Ride | Alex Dawson, Greg Gricus |
| Best Feature Film | Monsieur Lazhar | Phillippe Faiardeau |
| Best Adventure Film | Chasing Ice | Jeff Orlowski |
| People's Choice Award | High Ground | Michael Brown |

BIFF 2011

| Category | Film | Director |
|---|---|---|
| Best New Filmmaker | Touch | Jen McGowan |
| Best Animated Film | Thembi's Diary | Jisoo Kim |
| Best Call 2 Action Film | For Once in My Life | Jim Bigham |
| Best Colorado Film | Mother | Christophe Fauchere |
| Best Short Film | Glenn Owen Dodds | Frazer Bailey |
| Best Short Documentary | One Thousand Pictures: RFK's Last Journey | Jennifer Stoddart |
| Best Feature Documentary | Regretters | Marcus Lindeen |
| Best Feature Film | Mamas & Papas | Alice Nellis |
| People's Choice Award | Freedom Riders | Stanley Nelson |

BIFF 2010

| Category | Film | Director(s) |
|---|---|---|
| Most Creative Documentary | Waking Sleeping Beauty | Don Hahn |
| Best Call 2 Action Film | Dive! | Jeremy Seifert |
| Best Colorado Film | Diplomacy | Jonathan Goldman |
| Best Adventure Film | The Wildest Dream | Anthony Geffen |
| Best Animated Film | Secret of Kells | Tomm Moore |
| Best Short Film | The Morse Collectors | David Cooke |
| Best Short Documentary | No Strings | Daniel Junge |
| Best Feature Documentary | The Most Dangerous Man in America: Daniel Ellsberg and the Pentagon Papers | Rick Goldsmith and Judy Ehrlich |
| Best Feature Film | I Am Love | Luca Guadagnimo |
| Grand Prize | Ajami | Scandar Copti and Yaron Shani |

BIFF 2009

| Category | Film | Director(s) |
|---|---|---|
| Best Student Film | In the Dark | Alex and Sarah Fazelli |
| Best New Filmmaker | The Prince of Broadway | Sean Baker |
| Best Colorado Film | They Killed Sister Dorothy | Daniel Junge and Henry Ansbacher |
| Best Environmental Film | American Outrage | Beth and George Gage |
| Best Animated Film | Sita Sings the Blues | Nina Paley |
| Best Music Documentary | The Story of Anvil | Sacha Gervasi |
| Best Short Film | Tag | Natalya Uglitskikh |
| Best Short Documentary | Smile Pinki | Megan Mylan |
| Best Feature Documentary | Pirate for the Sea | Ron Colby and Patricia Van Ryker |
| Best Feature Film | Nothing But the Truth | Rod Lurie |
| Best Dramatic Comedy | Sunshine Cleaning | Christine Jeffs |
| Grand Prize | Burma VJ: Reporting From a Closed Country | Anders Ostergaard and Lise Lense-Miller |

BIFF 2008

| Category | Film | Director(s) |
|---|---|---|
| Best Student Film | The Replacement Child | Justin Lerner |
| Most Inspirational Film | The Singing Revolution | Jim Tusty and Maureen Castle |
| Best Colorado Film | Iron Ladies of Liberia | Daniel Junge and Siatta Scott Johnson |
| Best Comedy | The Job | Jonathan Browning |
| Best Animated Film | The Fog | Emilio Ramos |
| Best Short Film | Tanghi Argentini | Guido Thys |
| Best Short Documentary | In Times of War: Ray Parker | Mark and Christine Bonn |
| Best Feature Documentary | War Dance | Andrea Nix and Sean Fine |
| Best Feature Film | Charlie Bartlett | Jon Poll |
| Best Adventure Film | 3 Peaks 3 Weeks | Michael Brown |
| Grand Prize | Stranded | Gonzalo Arijon |

BIFF 2007

| Category | Film | Director(s) |
|---|---|---|
| Best Student Film | Lucky | Avie Luthra |
| Best New Filmmaker | Hamilton | Matthew Porterfield |
| Best Editing | Drunk in Public | David J. Sperling |
| Best Short Film | High Maintenance | Phillip Van |
| Best Colorado Film | Purvis of Overtown | David Raccuglia and Shaun Conrad |
| Best Animated Film | Badgered | Sharon Coleman |
| Best Short Documentary | Talk to Me | Mark Craig |
| Best Documentary | Air Guitar Nation | Alexandra Lipsitz |
| Best Documentary (Honorable Mention) | The Cats of Mirikitani | Linda Hattendorf |
| Best Feature Film | Journey from the Fall | Ham Tran |
| Grand Prize | In the Shadow of the Moon | David Sington |

BIFF 2006

| Category | Film | Director(s)(or Actor/Actress) |
|---|---|---|
| Best Student Film | The Saviour | Peter Templeman |
| Best New Filmmaker | Frozen Food Section | Andrew Menan |
| Best Short Film | West Bank Story | Ari Sandel |
| Best Colorado Film | Light of the Himalaya | Michael Brown |
| Best Animated Film | Magda | Chel White |
| Best Short Documentary | Carhenge: Genius or Junk? | David Libran |
| Best Documentary | Boys of Baraka | Heidi Ewing and Rachel Grady |
| Best Adventure Film | Ride across America | Stephen Auerbach |
| Best Feature Film | C.R.A.Z.Y. | Jean-Marc Vallee |
| Best Actress | C.R.A.Z.Y. | Danielle Proulx |
| Best Actor | The Civilization of Maxwell Bright | Patrick Warburton |
| Special Jury Award | Diameter of the Bomb | Andrew Quigley |

BIFF 2005

| Category | Film | Director(s) |
|---|---|---|
| Best Student Film | Pee Shy | Deb Hagen |
| Best Short Film | Down Dog | Richard Roll |
| Best Short Film (Honorable Mention) | Gay by Dawn | Jonathan London |
| Best Colorado Film | Subdivision, Colorado | Neil Widener |
| Best Animated Film | Road Raged Rodent | Patrick Mallek |
| Best Short Documentary | Caught in Paint | Rita Blitt |
| Best Documentary | Seoul Train | Jim Butterworth, Lisa Sleeth, and Aaron Lubarsky |
| Best Adventure Film | Farther than the Eye Can See | Michael Brown |
| Best Feature Film | The Real Old Testament | Curtis and Paul Hannum |
| Award of Excellence | The Liberace of Baghdad | Sean McAllister |
