= Artivist Film Festival & Awards =

International film festival and awards ceremony

- Location: Held in multiple international venues Based in Hollywood, California, United States
- Website: www.artivists.org

The Artivist Film Festival & Awards is an international film festival and awards ceremony dedicated to recognizing activist efforts of filmmakers, specifically in the areas of human rights, child advocacy, environmental preservation, and animal rights.

== Background ==
The Festival is held annually and tours internationally. Its mission is to strengthen the voice of activist/artists ("artivists"), while raising awareness for global causes. The festival is produced by Artivist Collective, a nonprofit organization founded in August 2003 by Diaky Diaz, Bettina Wolff, and Christopher Riedesel.

The first Artivist Film & Awards Festival was held April 27, 2007, at Hollywood's Egyptian Theater. Honorees were Ed Begley, Jr., Tippi Hedren, Mike Farrell and France Nuyen.

Set to coincide with Earth Day, when the 2nd Annual Artivist Film Festival began on April 20, 2005, Los Angeles Mayor James Hahn declared the day "Artivist Day", and among the festival's 2005 honorees were James Cromwell and Mira Sorvino.

The third annual festival was held in Los Angeles on November 9, 2006, and premiered the film Fast Food Nation. Festival honorees included Joaquin Phoenix, Daryl Hannah, and Matthew McConaughey.

== Board and honorees ==
Artivist's advisory board includes Congressman Dennis Kucinich, actor James Cromwell, actor/director James Haven, and Senator Barbara Boxer. Past honorees include Ted Danson, Alyssa Milano, Claes Nobel, James Cromwell, Mira Sorvino, Ed Begley, Jr., Tippi Hedren, Mike Farrell, France Nuyen, Joaquin Phoenix, Daryl Hannah, and Matthew McConaughey, among others.

== Award winners ==
=== 2011 ===
- Best Feature – Artivist Spirit: "Love Hate Love" directed by Dana Nachman and Don Hardy
- Best Short – Artivist Spirit: "Crooked Beauty" directed by Ken Paul Rosenthal
- Best Feature – Children's Advocacy: "Surfing Soweto" directed by Sara Blecher
- Best Short – Children's Advocacy: "Grace" directed by Meagan Kelly
- Best Feature – Animal Advocacy: "Green" directed by Patrick Rouxel
- Best Short – Animal Advocacy: "Saving Pelican 895" directed by Irene Taylor Brodsky
- Best Feature – Environmental Preservation: "Spoil" directed by Trip Jennings
- Best Short – Environmental Preservation: "The Leaves Keep Falling" directed by Julie Winokur
- Best Feature – International Human Rights: "Because We Were Beautiful" directed by Frank van Osch
- Best Short – International Human Rights: "Umoja" directed by Elizabeth Tadic

=== 2010 ===
- Best Feature – Artivist Spirit: "ReGeneration" directed by Philip Montgomery
- Best Short – Artivist Spirit: "Arena" directed by Jota Aronack
- Best Feature – Children's Advocacy: "Kids of the Majestic" directed by Dylan Verrechia
- Best Short – Children's Advocacy: "Sarah" directed by Brandon Hess
- Best Feature – Animal Advocacy: "Africa's Lost Eden" directed by James Byrne
- Best Short – Animal Advocacy: "Albatrocity" directed by J. Ollie Lucks, Iain Frengley, Edward Saltau
- Best Feature – Environmental Preservation: "Deep Green" directed by Matt Briggs
- Best Short – Environmental Preservation: "The Krill is Gone" directed by Jeffrey Bost
- Best Feature – International Human Rights: "Complexo – Universo Paralelo" directed by Mário Patrocinio
- Best Short – International Human Rights: "Mine: Story of a Sacred Mountain" directed by Toby Marsden

=== 2009 ===
- Best Feature – Artivist Spirit: "Intelligent Life" directed by Brian Malone
- Best Short – Artivist Spirit: "Rough Cut" directed by Taghreed Saadeh
- Best Feature – Children's Advocacy: "Children of War" directed by Bryan Single
- Best Short – Children's Advocacy: "The One Wayz" directed by Linda Chavez
- Best Feature – Animal Advocacy: "Ice Bears of the Beaufort" directed by Arthur C. Smith III
- Best Short – Animal Advocacy: "Abe" directed by Khen Shalem
- Best Feature – Environmental Preservation: "Belonging" directed by Gerard Ungerman
- Best Short – Environmental Preservation: "Urubus têm Asas (Vultures Have Wings)" directed by Marcos Negrão and Andre Rangel
- Best Feature – International Human Rights: "La Mission" directed by Peter Bratt
- Best Short – International Human Rights: "Intersection" directed by Jae Woe Kim

=== 2008 ===
- Best Feature – Artivist Spirit: "Zeitgeist: Addendum" directed by Peter Joseph (This was the festival opening movie)
- Best Short – Artivist Spirit: "Sovereignty" directed by Jonathan Sale
- Best Feature – International Human Rights: "They Turned Our Desert Into Fire" directed by Marck Brecke
- Best Short – International Human Rights: "Tibet: Beyond Fear" directed by Michael Perlman
- Best Feature – Children's Advocacy: "Bomb Harvest" directed by Kim Mordaunt
- Best Short – Children's Advocacy: "Returned: Child Soldiers of Nepal's Maoist Army" directed by Robert Koenig
- Best Feature – Animal Advocacy: "Companions to None" directed by Bill Buchanan
- Best Short – Animal Advocacy: "Blinders" directed by Donald Moss
- Best Feature – Environmental Preservation: "One Water" directed by Sanjeev Chatterjee
- Best Short – Environmental Preservation: "Eudaimonia" directed by Jude Shingle

=== 2007 ===
- Best Feature – Artivist Spirit: "Zeitgeist" directed by Peter Joseph
- Best Short – Artivist Spirit: "The Rich Have Their Own Photographers" directed by Ezra Bookstein
- Best Feature – International Human Rights: "American Drug War" directed by Kevin Booth
- Best Short – International Human Rights: "The Worst Job in the World" directed by Jens Pedersen
- Best Feature – Children's Advocacy: "Glue Boys" directed by Phil Hamer
- Best Short – Children's Advocacy: "Girl Stars: Anita the Beekeeper" directed by Vikash Nowlakh
- Best Feature – Animal Advocacy: "Beyond Closed Doors" directed by Hugh Dorigo
- Best Short – Animal Advocacy: "Sharks – Stewards of the Reef" directed by Holiday Johnson
- Best Feature – Environmental Preservation: "Out of Balance" directed by Tom Jackson
- Best Short – Environmental Preservation: "Anthropology 101" directed by Wayne Brittendon

=== 2006 ===
- Best Short – Human Rights: "A QUESTION OF LOYALTY" directed by Randall Wilkins
- Best Feature – Human Rights: "Occupation 101" directed by Sufyan Omeish and Abdallah Omeish
- Best Short – Children's Advocacy: "DAUGHTERS AND SONS: PREVENTING CHILD TRAFFICKING IN THE GOLDEN TRIANGLE" directed by Sarah Feinbloom
- Best Feature – Children's Advocacy: "SITA: A GIRL OF JAMBU" directed by Kathleen Man
- Best Short – International Environmental Preservation: "FREEDOM FUELS" directed by Martin O'Brien
- Best Feature – International Environmental Preservation: "Crude Impact" directed by James Jandak Wood
- Best Short – Animal Advocacy: "THE MEATRIX II" directed by Louis Fox
- Best Feature – Animal Advocacy: "MAD COWBOY" directed by Dr. Michael Tobias
- Best Short – Artivist Spirit: "BELIEVE" directed by Synthian Sharp
- Best Feature – Artivist Spirit: "CLASS ACT" directed by Sara Sackner

=== 2005 ===
- Best Short – Environmental Preservation: "OIL AND WATER" directed by Corwin Fergus
- Best Feature– Environmental Preservation: "OIL ON ICE" directed by Dale Djerassi
- Best Short – Animal Advocacy: "WITNESS" directed by Jennifer Stein
- Best Feature – Animal Advocacy: "Earthlings" directed by Shaun Monson
- Best Short – International Human Rights: "Seoul Train" directed by Jim Butterworth, Lisa Sleeth & Aaron Lubarsky
- Best Feature – International Human Rights: "TRUDELL" directed by Heather Rae
- Best Short – Children's Advocacy: "HUMMINGBIRD" directed by Holly Mosher
- Best Feature – Children's Advocacy: "STOLEN CHILDHOODS" directed by Len Morris
- Best Short – Artivist Spirit: "EMMANUEL'S GIFT" directed by Lisa Lax and Nancy Lax
- Best Feature – Artivist Spirit: "HOPE" directed by Catherine Margerin

=== 2004 ===
- Best Feature – Environmental Preservation: "BLUE VINYL" directed by Judith Helfland
- Best Short– Environmental Preservation: "GOOD RIDDANCE" directed by Nick Hilligoss
- Best Feature – Animal Rights: "CHATTEL" directed by Rebecca Harrell
- Best Short– Animal Rights: "4 DAYS" directed by Richard Hauck
- Best Feature – Children's Advocacy: "BORN INTO BROTHELS" directed by Ross Kauffman and Zana Briski
- Best Short – Children's Advocacy: "OLD ENOUGH TO KNOW BETTER" directed by Joel Venet
- Best Feature – Human Rights: "WE INTERRUPT THIS EMPIRE" directed by Rana Freedman
- Best Short – Human Rights: "BID 'EM IN" directed by Neal Sopata
- Best Feature – Artivist Spirit: "A LIFE OF DEATH" directed by Dawn Westlake
- Best Short – Artivist Spirit: "OUTSIDE THE LINES", Directed by Markus Stilman
- Audience Award: "NOTHING WITHOUT YOU" directed by Ted Mattison and Paul Kelleher
