= 2007 Slamdance Film Festival =

The 2007 Slamdance Film Festival took place in Park City, Utah from January 18 to January 27, 2007. It was the 13th iteration of the Slamdance Film Festival, an alternative to the more mainstream Sundance Film Festival. A list of all films that were screened at the festival is listed below.

== Awards ==
The 2007 Slamdance Film Festival recognized the following films at its awards ceremony held on January 26, 2007.

Award name	Film title	Award recipient
Grand Jury Award for Best Narrative Feature	Tijuana Makes Me Happy	Dylan Verrechia
Grand Jury Award for Best Documentary Feature	Unsettled	Adam Hootnick
Grand Jury Award for Best Animated Short	The Ballad of Mary Slade	Robin Fuller
Grand Jury Award for Best Documentary Short	A Map with Gaps	Alice Nelson
Grand Jury Award for Best Experimental Short	Avant Petalos Grillados	Cesar Velasco Broca
Grand Jury Award for Best Narrative Short	The Cow Thief	Charles Williams
Audience Award for Best Narrative Feature	Murder Party	Jeremy Saulnier
Audience Award for Best Documentary Feature	Red Without Blue	Brooke Sebold, Benita Sills & Todd Sills
Global Audience Award for Best Anarchy Film	Commode Creations: The Artwork of Barney Smith	Danny Bourque
Spirit of Slamdance Award	The Mallorys Go Black Market	JoEllen Martinson and William Scott Rees
Award for Best Feature Length Screenplay	Drool	Nancy Kissam
Award for Best Short Screenplay	4 Corners	Ken Pisani
Award for Best Teleplay	Ghost Towns	Marcus Clay Carmouche & Seamus Kevin Fahey
Award for Best Horror Competition Screenplay	Slaughter	Bobby Darby & Nathan Brookes
Creative Excellence Award for the Horror Screenplay Competition	Blood-Sucking Leeches and Flesh-Eating Maggots	Adam Balsam
Kodak Vision Award for Best Cinematography	Under the Sun	Nikolaus Summerer

== Films ==
=== $99 Specials ===
Title	Section	Director	Country	Minutes	Year	Premiere	URL
The Instrumentalist	$99 Specials	Troy Morgan	United States	3	2007	N/A	slamdance
The Instrumentalist	Written by Troy Morgan						
The Instrumentalist	Starring unknown						
Midlife with Glasses	$99 Specials	Heidi Van Lier	United States	5	2007	N/A	slamdance
Midlife with Glasses	Written by Heidi Van Lier						
Midlife with Glasses	Starring unknown						
Processing	$99 Specials	Michael Lucid	United States	5	2007	N/A	slamdance
Processing	Written by Brooke Bloom, Michael Lucid						
Processing	Starring unknown						
The Sins of the Nude	$99 Specials	Todd Rohal	United States	5	2007	N/A	slamdance
The Sins of the Nude	Written by Todd Rohal						
The Sins of the Nude	Starring unknown						

=== 21+ Film Series ===
Title	Section	Director	Country	Minutes	Year	Premiere	URL
Dante's Inferno	21+ Film Series	Sean Meredith	United States	78	2007	World Premiere	slamdance imdb
Dante's Inferno	Written by Sandow Birk, Sean Meredith, Paul Zaloom						
Dante's Inferno	Starring James Cromwell, John Fleck, Tony Hale, Dermot Mulroney, Martha Plimpton, Dan Snyder, Paul Zaloom						
Fritt vilt (Cold Prey)	21+ Film Series	Roar Uthaug	Norway	97	2006	N/A	slamdance imdb
Fritt vilt (Cold Prey)	Written by Thomas Moldestad						
Fritt vilt (Cold Prey)	Starring Ingrid Bolsø Berdal, Rolf Kristian Larsen, Tomas Alf Larsen, Endre Martin Blindheim Midtstigen, Victoria Winge						
Homo Erectus	21+ Film Series	Adam Rifkin	United States	95	2006	World Premiere	slamdance imdb
Homo Erectus	Written by Adam Rifkin						
Homo Erectus	Starring Gary Busey, David Carradine, Ali Larter, Hayes Macarthur, Adam Rifkin, Talia Shire						

=== Anarchy Online Films ===
All of the films in this category are available for free download on slamdance.com

Title	Section	Director	Country	Minutes	Year	Premiere	URL
Der Bildermacher (The Photographer)	Anarchy	Stefan Hering	Germany	6	2002	N/A	slamdance
Der Bildermacher (The Photographer)	Written by Stefan Hering						
Der Bildermacher (The Photographer)	Starring unknown						
Bump, Tick, Scratch	Anarchy	Micah Perta Rob Grobengieser	United States	2	2005	N/A	slamdance
Bump, Tick, Scratch	Written by Micah Perta Rob Grobengieser						
Bump, Tick, Scratch	Starring John Pugh of !!!						
Commode Creations: The Artwork of Barney Smith	Anarchy	Danny Bourque	United States	4	2005	N/A	slamdance imdb
Commode Creations: The Artwork of Barney Smith	Written by Danny Bourque						
Commode Creations: The Artwork of Barney Smith	Starring Barney Smith						
Counting Water	Anarchy	Brian Savelson	United States	6	2006	N/A	slamdance
Counting Water	Written by Brian Savelson						
Counting Water	Starring unknown						
Isabelle & Stuart	Anarchy	Tom Flynn	United States	4	2006	N/A	slamdance
Isabelle & Stuart	Written by Tom Flynn						
Isabelle & Stuart	Starring unknown						
Mandir	Anarchy	Pragya Tomar	United States	4	2006	N/A	slamdance
Mandir	Written by Pragya Tomar						
Mandir	Starring unknown						
The Ramones and I	Anarchy	Rusty Nails	United States	8	2005	N/A	slamdance
The Ramones and I	Written by unknown						
The Ramones and I	Starring unknown						
Rapid Retreat	Anarchy	Rebecca Miller	UK	3	2005	N/A	slamdance
Rapid Retreat	Written by Rebecca Miller						
Rapid Retreat	Starring unknown						
The Willowz: We Live On Your Street	Anarchy	Michael Sladek	United States	3	2006	N/A	slamdance
The Willowz: We Live On Your Street	Written by Michael Sladek						
The Willowz: We Live On Your Street	Starring unknown						

=== Animated Shorts ===
Title	Section	Director	Country	Minutes	Year	Premiere	URL
Africa Parting	Animated Shorts	Brian Loschiavo, Robyn Yannoukos	United States	7	2006	U.S. Premiere	slamdance
Africa Parting	Written by Brian Loschiavo, Robyn Yannoukos						
Africa Parting	Starring unknown						
The Ballad of Mary Slade	Animated Shorts	Robin Fuller	UK	3	2006	North American Premiere	slamdance
The Ballad of Mary Slade	Written by Robin Fuller						
The Ballad of Mary Slade	Starring Paul Robinson, Keith Tutt, Rose Walker						
Close Your Eyes and Do Not Breathe	Animated Shorts	Vuk Jevremovic	Germany	7	2006	N/A	slamdance
Close Your Eyes and Do Not Breathe	Written by Vuk Jevremovic						
Close Your Eyes and Do Not Breathe	Starring unknown						
Cranium Theater	Animated Shorts	Jason Sandri	United States	7	2006	N/A	slamdance
Cranium Theater	Written by Jason Sandri						
Cranium Theater	Starring unknown						
Eva	Animated Shorts	Martin Quaden	United States	9	2005	N/A	slamdance
Eva	Written by Martin Quaden						
Eva	Starring unknown						
Infinite Justice	Animated Shorts	Karl Tebbe	Germany	2	2006	N/A	slamdance
Infinite Justice	Written by Veit Sprenger						
Infinite Justice	Starring unknown						
Kuro Kumo	Animated Shorts	Jesse Norton	United States	5	2006	World Premiere	slamdance
Kuro Kumo	Written by McCunney (translation), Jesse Norton						
Kuro Kumo	Starring Kaoru, Testu						
Latent Sorrow	Animated Shorts	Shon Kim	United States	4	2005	N/A	slamdance
Latent Sorrow	Written by N/A						
Latent Sorrow	Starring unknown						
Loom	Animated Shorts	Scott Kravitz	United States	5	2006	North American Premiere	slamdance
Loom	Written by Scott Kravitz						
Loom	Starring Clay People						
Matière / Material	Animated Shorts	Boran Richard	Canada	6	2006	U.S. Premiere	slamdance
Matière / Material	Written by Boran Richard						
Matière / Material	Starring unknown						
Oneheadword Protection	Animated Shorts	Igor Et Ivan Buharov	Hungary	6	2006	North American Premiere	slamdance
Oneheadword Protection	Written by Igor Et Ivan Buharov						
Oneheadword Protection	Starring Szabolcs Bodi, Igor Et Ivan Buharov, Eva Csiki, Eva Molnar, Janosne Pallagi, Levente Papp						
Printed Rainbow	Animated Shorts	Gitanjali Rao	India	15	2006	North American Premiere	slamdance
Printed Rainbow	Written by Gitanjali Rao						
Printed Rainbow	Starring unknown						
Tinnitus	Animated Shorts	Mark Zero Lastimosa	United States	7	2006	N/A	slamdance
Tinnitus	Written by Mark Zero Lastimosa						
Tinnitus	Starring Sarah Burns, Dana Dancho						
Ujbaz Izbeneki Has Lost His Soul	Animated Shorts	Neil Jack	UK	5	2006	North American Premiere	slamdance
Ujbaz Izbeneki Has Lost His Soul	Written by Cameron Fraser, Neil Jack						
Ujbaz Izbeneki Has Lost His Soul	Starring Mark McDonnell						

=== Documentary Competition Features ===
Title	Section	Director	Country	Minutes	Year	Premiere	URL
Bad Boys of Summer	Documentary Competition Features	Loren Mendell, Tiller Russell	United States	76	2006	World Premiere	slamdance imdb
Bad Boys of Summer	Written by N/A						
Bad Boys of Summer	Starring William Amos, Michael Bjorlin, Bobo T. Fuimaono, Allison Harrington, David Miller, Chris Rich, Earl Smith, Elliot Smith						
The Ballad of AJ Weberman	Documentary Competition Features	James Bluemel, Oliver Ralfe	UK	80	2007	U.S. Premiere	slamdance imdb
The Ballad of AJ Weberman	Written by N/A						
The Ballad of AJ Weberman	Starring unknown						
Children of God: Lost and Found	Documentary Competition Features	Noah Thomson	United States	75	2006	World Premiere	slamdance imdb
Children of God: Lost and Found	Written by Noah Thomson						
Children of God: Lost and Found	Starring Noah Thomson						
A Dream in Doubt	Documentary Competition Features	Tami Yeager	United States	56	2006	World Premiere	slamdance imdb
A Dream in Doubt	Written by Valerie Kelly, Tami Yeager						
A Dream in Doubt	Starring unknown						
The King of Kong	Documentary Competition Features	Seth Gordon	United States	79	2007	World Premiere	slamdance imdb
The King of Kong	Written by N/A						
The King of Kong	Starring Walter Day, Billy Mitchell, Steve Wiebe, Brian Kuh, Todd Rogers, Steve Sanders, Doris Self.						
Off the Grid: Life on the Mesa	Documentary Competition Features	Jeremy Stulberg, Randy Stulberg	United States	61	2006	World Premiere	slamdance imdb
Off the Grid: Life on the Mesa	Written by N/A						
Off the Grid: Life on the Mesa	Starring unknown						
Red Without Blue	Documentary Competition Features	Brooke Sebold, Benita Sills, Todd Sills	United States	74	2006	World Premiere	slamdance imdb
Red Without Blue	Written by N/A						
Red Without Blue	Starring unknown						
Rock The Bells	Documentary Competition Features	Denis Henry Hennelly, Casey Suchan	United States	105	2006	N/A	slamdance imdb
Rock The Bells	Written by N/A						
Rock The Bells	Starring Dilated Peoples, Sage Francis, Carla Garcia, Chali 2Na, DJ Nu-Mark, Eyedea + Abilities, MC Supernatural, Redman, Brian Valdez, Chang Weisberg, Wu Tang Clan						
Row Hard No Excuses	Documentary Competition Features	Luke Wolbach	United States	88	2007	World Premiere	slamdance imdb
Row Hard No Excuses	Written by N/A						
Row Hard No Excuses	Starring unknown						
Unsettled	Documentary Competition Features	Adam Hootnick	United States	80	2007	World Premiere	slamdance imdb
Unsettled	Written by Adam Hootnick						
Unsettled	Starring unknown						

=== Documentary Shorts ===
Title	Section	Director	Country	Minutes	Year	Premiere	URL
Fat Cake	Documentary Shorts	Leslie Dektor	South Africa	25	2005	N/A	slamdance
Fat Cake	Written by N/A						
Fat Cake	Starring unknown						
Long Haul	Documentary Shorts	Erin Hudson	United States	21	2006	World Premiere	slamdance
Long Haul	Written by Erin Hudson						
Long Haul	Starring unknown						
Man Up	Documentary Shorts	Arturo Cabanas	United States	11	2006	N/A	slamdance
Man Up	Written by N/A						
Man Up	Starring Charles McCaffrey, Patrick McCaffrey						
A Map with Gaps	Documentary Shorts	Alice Nelson	UK	26	2006	N/A	slamdance
A Map with Gaps	Written by Alice Nelson, Brian Nelson						
A Map with Gaps	Starring Duncan Rennie						
Monsieur Borges and I	Documentary Shorts	Jasmin Gordon	United States	22	2006	World Premiere	slamdance
Monsieur Borges and I	Written by N/A						
Monsieur Borges and I	Starring unknown						
The Song of Haenyo	Documentary Shorts	Minjoo Lee	Republic of Korea	30	2006	World Premiere	slamdance
The Song of Haenyo	Written by Jihyun Lee						
The Song of Haenyo	Starring unknown						

=== Gallery Shorts ===
Title	Section	Director	Country	Minutes	Year	Premiere	URL
Alan and Samir	Gallery Shorts	Yann Demange	UK	14	2006	N/A	slamdance
Alan and Samir	Written by Yann Demange						
Alan and Samir	Starring Adam Deacon, Robert Gallas						
Avant Pétalos Grillados	Gallery Shorts	Velasco Broca	Spain	10	2006	U.S. Premiere	slamdance
Avant Pétalos Grillados	Written by Velasco Broca						
Avant Pétalos Grillados	Starring Bárbara Mingo Costalls, Jose Antonio Herreruela, Kaloyan Krasimirov Kolev, Silvio Samuel Savidur						
The Back of Her Head	Gallery Shorts	Josh Safdie	United States	20	2006	World Premiere	slamdance
The Back of Her Head	Written by Josh Safdie						
The Back of Her Head	Starring Charlotte Pinson, Josh Safdie, Stephen Schneider, Jagdeep Singh, Jake Sumner						
A Bit on the Side	Gallery Shorts	Steve Sullivan	UK	12	2006	N/A	slamdance
A Bit on the Side	Written by Liam O'Reilly						
A Bit on the Side	Starring Dean Taylor						
The Caress of the Creature	Gallery Shorts	Stewart Mcalpine	United States	19	2006	World Premiere	slamdance
The Caress of the Creature	Written by Stewart Mcalpine						
The Caress of the Creature	Starring Michael Carlucci, Junior Mendez, Owen Provencher						
The Cow Thief	Gallery Shorts	Charles Williams	Australia	20	2005	N/A	slamdance
The Cow Thief	Written by Matt Kamen, Charles Williams						
The Cow Thief	Starring Tom Budge, Syd Brisbane, Suzie Dee						
Dealing	Gallery Shorts	Lena Dunham	United States	15	2006	U.S. Premiere	slamdance
Dealing	Written by Lena Dunham						
Dealing	Starring Carroll Dunham, Grace Dunham, Lena Dunham, Donald Rosenfeld, Laurie Simmons						
Dentist Visit	Gallery Shorts	Yves Hofer	United States	18	2006	World Premiere	slamdance
Dentist Visit	Written by Yves Hofer						
Dentist Visit	Starring Carlo Alban, Sol Echeverria, Florence Young						
Dr.Terror's House of Pancakes	Gallery Shorts	Tyson James Theroux	United States	18	2006	World Premiere	slamdance
Dr.Terror's House of Pancakes	Written by Tyson James Theroux						
Dr.Terror's House of Pancakes	Starring Corey Brewer, Erin Gilbert, Thea Lester, Darby McDevitt, Steven Whippo						
Evangeleo	Gallery Shorts	Brandon Harris	United States	21	2006	N/A	slamdance
Evangeleo	Written by Brandon Harris						
Evangeleo	Starring Ayesha Adamo, Birda Gilmore, Dan Kim, Angela Logan, Irungu Mutu, Grace Savage						
The Famous Joe Project	Gallery Shorts	Eli Rarey	United States	16	2006	World Premiere	slamdance
The Famous Joe Project	Written by Eli Rarey						
The Famous Joe Project	Starring Duncan Ferguson						
Farmboy	Gallery Shorts	Duncan Ferguson	United States	12	2006	World Premiere	slamdance
Farmboy	Written by Duncan Ferguson						
Farmboy	Starring Monk Farley, Duncan Ferguson, Lowell Hutcheson						
The Golden Samovar	Gallery Shorts	Phillip Chernyak	United States	9	2006	World Premiere	slamdance
The Golden Samovar	Written by Phillip Chernyak						
The Golden Samovar	Starring Elizabeth Kenner, Rachel Patterson, Angela Rollo						
The Haircut	Gallery Shorts	Bohdana Smyrnova	Ukraine	7	2006	North American Premiere	slamdance
The Haircut	Written by Bohdana Smyrnova						
The Haircut	Starring Melaena Cadiz, Jacqueline Thuener-Rego, Ivo Velon						
Happy Birthday 2 You	Gallery Shorts	David Alcalde	Spain	14	2006	N/A	slamdance
Happy Birthday 2 You	Written by David Alcalde						
Happy Birthday 2 You	Starring Laura Dominguez, Pau Poch						
Hijo	Gallery Shorts	Nicolás Melini	Spain	8	2005	North American Premiere	slamdance
Hijo	Written by Nicolás Melini						
Hijo	Starring Nieves de Medina, Israel Rodríguez						
Hiyab	Gallery Shorts	Xavi Sala	Spain	8	2005	N/A	slamdance
Hiyab	Written by Xavi Sala						
Hiyab	Starring Lorena Rosado, José Luis Torrijo, Ana Wagener						
A Hooker & A Dirt Road End	Gallery Shorts	John Nijhawan	United States	12	2005	N/A	slamdance
A Hooker & A Dirt Road End	Written by John Nijhawan						
A Hooker & A Dirt Road End	Starring Michael Halliday, Camille Marshall, John Nijhawan, John Ashley Reese, Rod Sweitzer						
A Killer on I-475	Gallery Shorts	Sean Stacy	United States	12	2007	World Premiere	slamdance
A Killer on I-475	Written by Sean Stacy						
A Killer on I-475	Starring Welton Boomer, Adam Gomoll, Aqeelah A. Rahim Jr. Latisha Williams						
La Jaula Del Monarca (A Monarch Cage)	Gallery Shorts	Paul Di Palma	Mexico	13	2006	World Premiere	slamdance
La Jaula Del Monarca (A Monarch Cage)	Written by Paul Di Palma						
La Jaula Del Monarca (A Monarch Cage)	Starring Moisés Arizmendi, Rubén Cristiany, Zamia Fandiño						
Lawrence	Gallery Shorts	Gregory Mitnick	United States	12	2006	World Premiere	slamdance
Lawrence	Written by Gregory Mitnick						
Lawrence	Starring Yin Chang, Tokio Sasaki (asTokio N. Paris)						
Men on a Lake	Gallery Shorts	Karl Raudsepp-Hearne	Canada	16	2006	N/A	slamdance
Men on a Lake	Written by Karl Raudsepp-Hearne						
Men on a Lake	Starring Andrew Johnston, Frank Schorpion						
Red Timber (Rotes Holz)	Gallery Shorts	Agnes Karow	Germany	12	2006	N/A	slamdance
Red Timber (Rotes Holz)	Written by Agnes Karow						
Red Timber (Rotes Holz)	Starring Susanne Schäfer						
Strangers	Gallery Shorts	Ondrej Rudavsky	Slovakia	7	2006	World Premiere	slamdance
Strangers	Written by unknown						
Strangers	Starring Jana Kolesarova, Muro, Ondrej Rudavsky						
Swerve	Gallery Shorts	Andrew Piccone	United States	12	2006	World Premiere	slamdance
Swerve	Written by Andrew Piccone						
Swerve	Starring Todd Hickey, Diana Valentine						
Yonder	Gallery Shorts	Mika Johnson	United States	20	2006	World Premiere	slamdance
Yonder	Written by Peter Hlinka						
Yonder	Starring Alex D'soleil, Peter Hlinka, Mika Johnson						
Zekuu	Gallery Shorts	Katsura Murata	Japan	27	2006	N/A	slamdance
Zekuu	Written by Katsura Murata						
Zekuu	Starring Ayano Kondo, Hayato Nakagawa, Miyou Tange						

=== Narrative Competition Features ===
Title	Section	Director	Country	Minutes	Year	Premiere	URL
American Fork	Narrative Competition Features	Chris Bowman	United States	94	2006	World Premiere	slamdance imdb
American Fork	Written by Hubbel Palmer						
American Fork	Starring William Baldwin, Bruce McGill, Hubbel Palmer, Kathleen Quinlan, Mary Lynn Rajskub						
American Zombie	Narrative Competition Features	Grace Lee	United States	90	2006	World Premiere	slamdance imdb
American Zombie	Written by Grace Lee, Rebecca Sonnenshine						
American Zombie	Starring Austin Basis, Suzy Nakamura, John Solomon, Al Vicente, Jane Edith Wilson						
Bangkok	Narrative Competition Features	Colin Drobnis	United States	98	2006	N/A	slamdance imdb
Bangkok	Written by Colin Drobnis						
Bangkok	Starring Abel Johnson, Aoi Kawichai, Daniel Miller, Aaron Smith						
Crime Fiction	Narrative Competition Features	Will Slocombe	United States	83	2006	World Premiere	slamdance imdb
Crime Fiction	Written by Jonathan Eliot						
Crime Fiction	Starring Dan Bakkedahl, Jonathan Eliot, Yasen Peyankov, Amy Sloan, Christian Stolte						
The Death of Michael Smith	Narrative Competition Features	Daniel Casey	United States	88	2006	World Premiere	slamdance imdb
The Death of Michael Smith	Written by Daniel Casey						
The Death of Michael Smith	Starring Thomas Galasso, Jennifer Lester, Mike Mili, Oksana Mirzoyan, Chris Moller, Fox Valade, Robert Emmett Young						
Murder Party	Narrative Competition Features	Jeremy Saulnier	United States	80	2007	World Premiere	slamdance imdb
Murder Party	Written by Jeremy Saulnier						
Murder Party	Starring Sandy Barnett, Macon Blair, Paul Goldblatt, Bill Lacey, Stacy Rock, Skei Saulnier, Chris Sharp, Bill Tangradi						
Over the GW	Narrative Competition Features	Nick Gaglia	United States	75	2007	World Premiere	slamdance imdb
Over the GW	Written by Nick Gaglia						
Over the GW	Starring Kether Donohue, George Gallagher, Juliana Huestis, Albert Insinnia, G.R. Johnson, Michael Mathis, Justin Swain, Steve S. Stanulis						
The Path of Most Resistance	Narrative Competition Features	Peter Kelley	United States	40	2006	N/A	slamdance imdb
The Path of Most Resistance	Written by Peter Kelley						
The Path of Most Resistance	Starring Tim Rouhana, Spencer Grammer						
Tijuana Makes Me Happy	Narrative Competition Features	Dylan Verrechia	Mexico	79	2006	N/A	slamdance imdb
Tijuana Makes Me Happy	Written by James Lefkowitz, Pablo Tendilla, Dylan Verrechia						
Tijuana Makes Me Happy	Starring Alejandro Ramirez Achutegui, Luis Carmona Arochi, Marco Carmona Arochi, Ivan Equihua Carlos, Aidee Gonzalez, Jorge Jorge Hernández, Pablo Tendilla Ortiz, Pablo Jimenez Rivera, Pablo Tendilla Rocha, Raul Rodriguez Rodriguez, Darina Rabago Soto						
Under The Sun	Narrative Competition Features	Baran Bo Odar	Germany	60	2006	U.S. Premiere	slamdance
Under The Sun	Written by Baran Bo Odar						
Under The Sun	Starring Astrid M. Fuenderich, Janina Stopper, Alexandra Von Schwerin, Maximilian Waldmann						

=== Narrative Shorts Before Features ===
Title	Section	Director	Country	Minutes	Year	Premiere	URL
Avatar	Narrative Shorts Before Features	Lluis Quilez	Spain	15	2005	N/A	slamdance
Avatar	Written by Lluis Quilez						
Avatar	Starring Sebastian Haro, Rosana Pastor						
Checkpoint	Narrative Shorts Before Features	Ben Phelps	Australia	11	2006	N/A	slamdance
Checkpoint	Written by Ben Phelps						
Checkpoint	Starring Rodney Afif, Casey Burgess, Alex Dimitriades, Kate Raison, Brett Stiller, Christian Willis						
Die Besucher (The Visitors)	Narrative Shorts Before Features	Ulrike Molsen	Germany	38	2006	N/A	slamdance imdb
Die Besucher (The Visitors)	Written by Ulrike Molsen						
Die Besucher (The Visitors)	Starring Johanna Geissler, Myriam Schroeder, Dirk Borchardt						
HELLo?	Narrative Shorts Before Features	Gavin Lim	Singapore	15	2006	N/A	slamdance
HELLo?	Written by Gavin Lim						
HELLo?	Starring Angela May, Timothy Nga, Yeo Yann Yann						
La China	Narrative Shorts Before Features	Diego Postigo, Antonia San Juan	Spain	18	2005	N/A	slamdance
La China	Written by Antonia San Juan, Luis Miguel Seguí						
La China	Starring Antonia San Juan, Luis Miguel Seguí						
The Listening Dead	Narrative Shorts Before Features	Phil Mucci	United States	14	2006	N/A	slamdance
The Listening Dead	Written by Phil Mucci						
The Listening Dead	Starring Sarah Hund, Karen Miller, Peter Scriba						
Lola	Narrative Shorts Before Features	Matthew Ross	United States	12	2006	N/A	slamdance
Lola	Written by Matthew Ross						
Lola	Starring Cordelia Reynolds, Daniel Sauli, Dean Wareham						
The Mallorys Go Black Market	Narrative Shorts Before Features	Joellen Martinson, William Scott Rees	United States	13	2006	World Premiere	slamdance
The Mallorys Go Black Market	Written by Joellen Martinson, William Scott Rees						
The Mallorys Go Black Market	Starring Ben Fredrickson, Lizzie Martinson, Tina Testa, Allison True						
The Package	Narrative Shorts Before Features	Caskey Ebeling	Brazil	11	2007	World Premiere	slamdance
The Package	Written by Caskey Ebeling						
The Package	Starring Ze Alex, Bel Beloni, Edson Curi, Angus Cash Ebeling, Feodora, Patricia Lanari, Henrique Lima, Julio Matosinho, Franscini Melo, Eduardo Rossi, Ana Amelia Viera, Nelson Ziegler						
Paralegal	Narrative Shorts Before Features	Eric Lane	United States	13	2006	N/A	slamdance
Paralegal	Written by Eric Lane						
Paralegal	Starring Jaime Andrews, Eric Lane						
Rover's Return	Narrative Shorts Before Features	Mark Hammett	UK	11	2006	World Premiere	slamdance
Rover's Return	Written by Mark Hammett						
Rover's Return	Starring Steve Alais, Alex Bond						
The Saddest Boy in the World	Narrative Shorts Before Features	Jamie Travis	Canada	13	2006	U.S. Premiere	slamdance
The Saddest Boy in the World	Written by Jamie Travis						
The Saddest Boy in the World	Starring Colton Boreen, Babz Chula, Hailey Conner, Jerocko Harder, Kirsten Robek, Benjamin B. Smith						
Waves. Day Return	Narrative Shorts Before Features	Maciej Pisarek	Poland	27	2005	N/A	slamdance
Waves. Day Return	Written by Maciej Pisarek, Alison Ripley						
Waves. Day Return	Starring Anna Samusionek, Krzysztof Stroinski, Natalia Rosinska						

=== Special Screenings ===
Title	Section	Director	Country	Minutes	Year	Premiere	URL
Alice Neel	Special Screenings	Andrew Neel	United States	81	2006	World Premiere	slamdance imdb
Alice Neel	Written by Andrew Neel						
Alice Neel	Starring Chuck Close, Marlene Dumas, Jeremy Lewison, Hartley Neel, Richard Neel, Mira Schor, Robert Storr						
Crashing	Special Screenings	Gary Walkow	United States	80	2007	World Premiere	slamdance imdb
Crashing	Written by Alain Silver, Gary Walkow						
Crashing	Starring Lizzy Caplan, David Cross, Stephen Gyllenhaal, Alex Kingston, Izabella Miko, Campbell Scott						
Ganja Queen	Special Screenings	Janine Hosking	Australia	123	2006	World Premiere	slamdance imdb
Ganja Queen	Written by Janine Hosking						
Ganja Queen	Starring unknown						
Super Amigos	Special Screenings	Arturo Pérez Torres	Canada	82	2007	World Premiere	slamdance imdb
Super Amigos	Written by N/A						
Super Amigos	Starring unknown						
Weirdsville	Special Screenings	Allan Moyle	Canada	90	2006	World Premiere	slamdance imdb
Weirdsville	Written by Willem Wennekers						
Weirdsville	Starring Wes Bentley, Taryn Manning, Scott Speedman						
You Are Here	Special Screenings	Henry Pincus	United States	82	2006	World Premiere	slamdance imdb
You Are Here	Written by Henry Pincus						
You Are Here	Starring Michael Biehn, Adam Campbell, Katie Cassidy, Patrick Flueger, Lauren German, Chris Lowell, Bijou Phillips						
