= Dylan Verrechia =

Barthélemois film director, screenwriter and producer

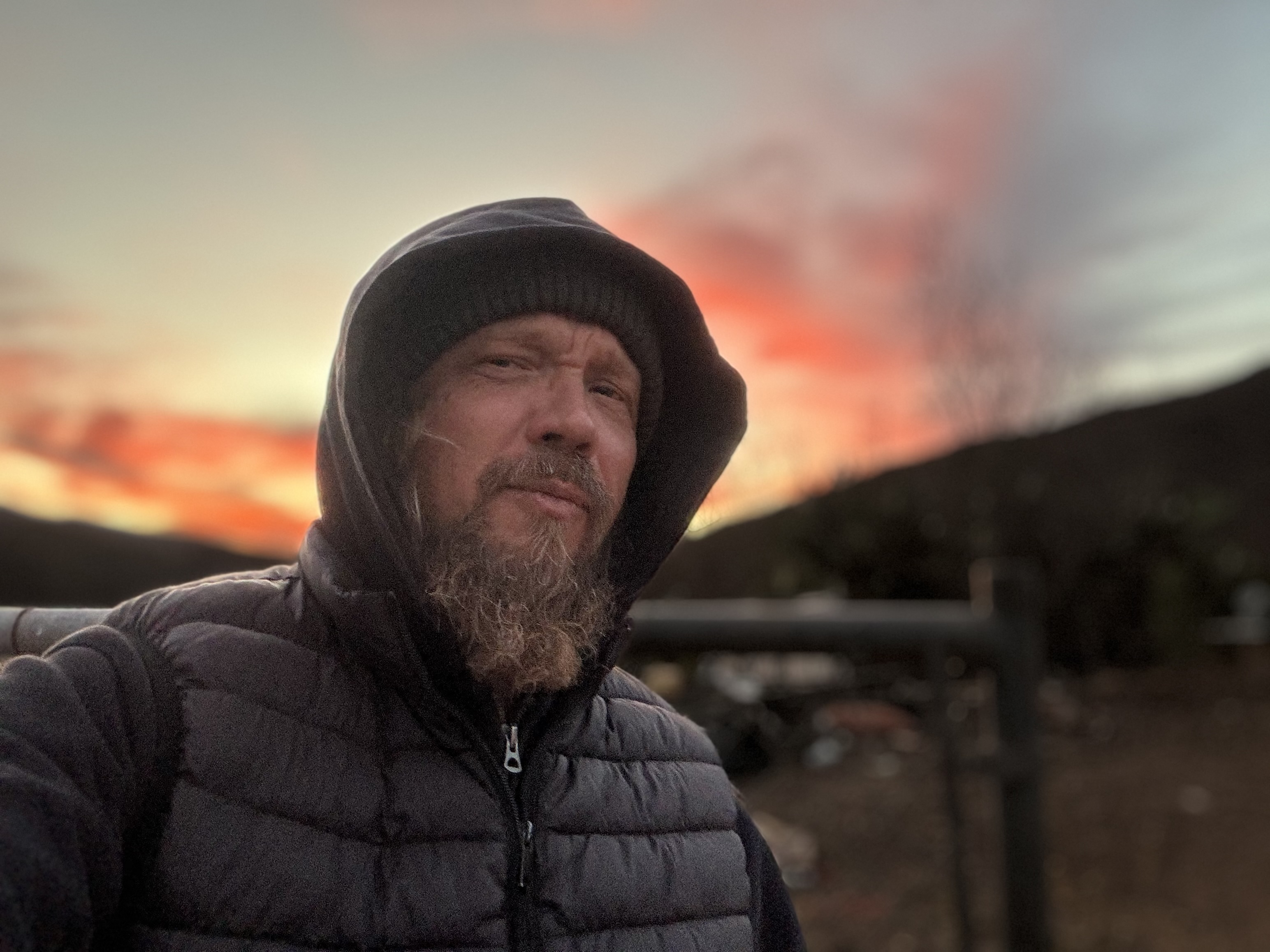
- Verrechia in 2025
- Born: Dylan Verrechia; March 9, 1976 (age 50); Paris, France
- Occupation: Filmmaker
- Website: www.verrechiafilms.com

Dylan Verrechia (born March 9, 1976, in Paris) is a Dane Barthélemois award-winning film director, auteur, screenwriter, director of photography, and producer, with ankylosing spondylitis and multiple sclerosis. He is best known for his trilogy: Tijuana Makes Me Happy, Tierra madre, and La Pura Vida, which won him among many other accolades the Grand Jury Prize for Best Narrative Feature at Slamdance, Best Mexican Fiction Feature Special Mention at Morelia International Film Festival, and Best Narrative Feature at Reeling: The Chicago LGBTQ+ International Film Festival. Verrechia's documentaries Kumeyaay Land received Best Documentary at Red Nation Film Festival, and Kids of the Majestic won Best Feature Children's Advocacy at Artivist Film Festival & Awards. His dark fantasy Pégame won Best Mexican Narrative Feature at Rosarito International Film Festival, and Best International Feature Film at Williamsburg International Film Festival. He is also founder of Troopers Films (Arakimentari Audience Award Winner for Best Feature Documentary at Brooklyn Film Festival), 25th Frame (Sara Ziff's pre-MeToo movement Picture Me Audience Award Winner at Milan Film Festival), and Palenque Filmaciones (Padre nuestro (2007 film) Grand Jury Prize at the 2007 Sundance Film Festival). Verrechia is a U.S. citizen, and his films look particularly at Baja California, Mexico, where he lives.

== Career ==
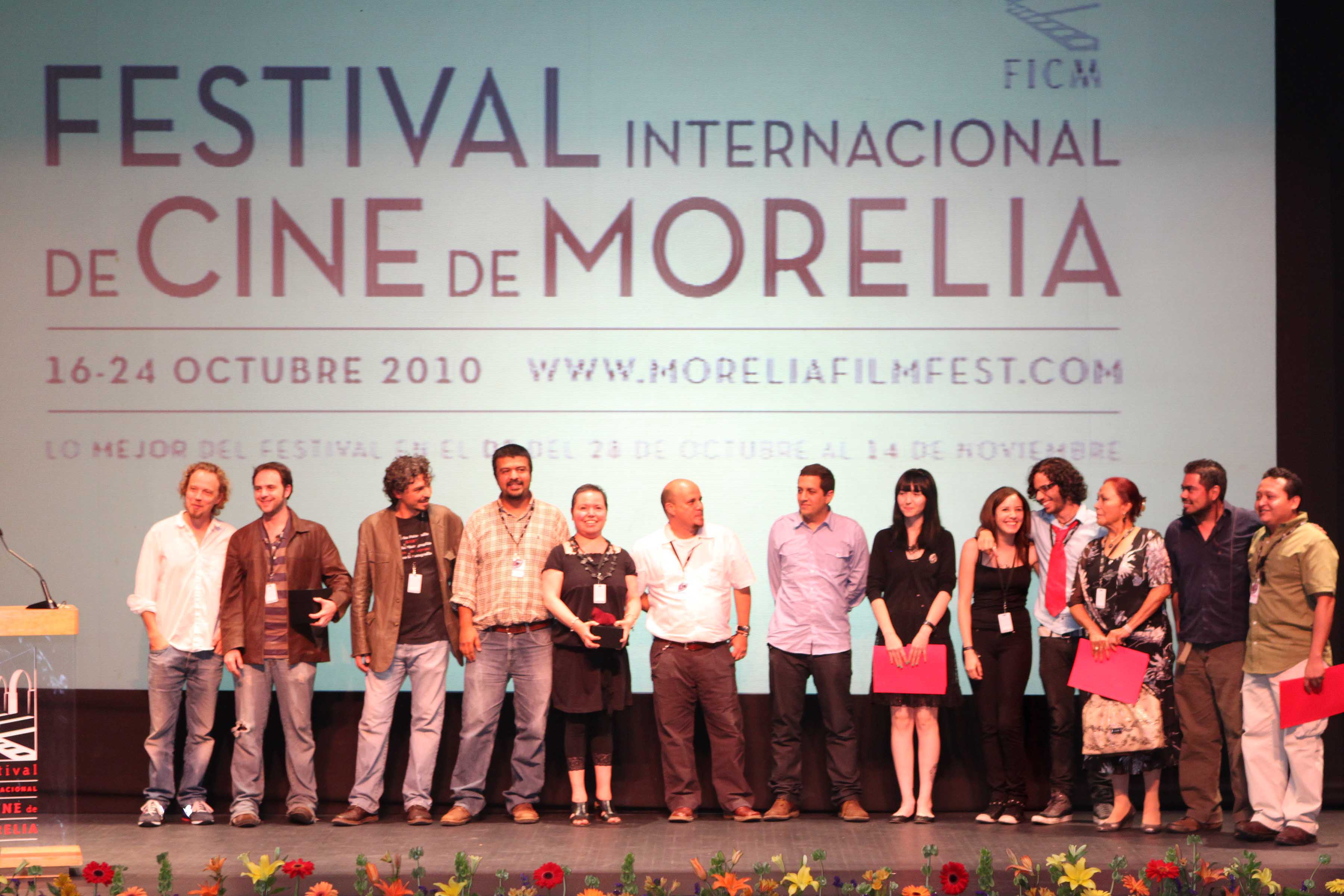
Winners FICM 2010.

Verrechia is from Saint Barthélemy (French Antilles), spending years in hospital due to severe ankylosing spondylitis. He is a Barthélemois French-born Dane, of US citizenship, born in Paris, of Italian, Irish-Breton, Sami-Swedish, and Sephardic Spanish origins. After the national service, Verrechia studied cinema under the direction of Jean Rouch at the Cinémathèque française, graduating from Paris Nanterre University in 1996. He then graduated with honors in Film and TV from New York University Tisch School of the Arts, and obtained his American citizenship in 2004. Verrechia is the co-founder of Troopers Films (Arakimentari directed by Travis Klose on Nobuyoshi Araki with Björk and Beat Takeshi, Audience Award for Best Documentary at Brooklyn Film Festival), of Palenque Filmaciones (Sangre de mi sangre directed by Christopher Zalla, Grand Jury Prize for Best Dramatic at Sundance Film Festival), and of 25th Frame (Picture Me directed by Sara Ziff), Audience Award for Best Documentary at Milan International Film Festival).

Verrechia is a director of Mexican cinema, and his films have won awards at festivals worldwide. Over a period of twenty years, he directed the Tijuana trilogy: Tijuana Makes Me Happy won the Grand Jury Prize for Best Narrative Feature at Slamdance Film Festival, the Indie Max Award for Best Feature Film at San Antonio Film Festival, and screened at CECUT Tijuana Cinematheque. Tierra Madre won the Jury Honorable Mention for Best Mexican Feature Film at Morelia International Film Festival, Best Narrative Feature at Reeling: The Chicago LGBTQ+ International Film Festival, Diversity Award for Best Feature Film at Barcelona LGTIBQ+ Film Festival, Outstanding Achievement in Foreign Feature Award at Williamsburg International Film Festival, Cinesul Award for Best Picture at Cinesul Ibero-Americano Film Festival, Golden Palm for Best Feature Film at Mexico International Film Festival, Honorary Mention at New Jersey Film Festival, and Silver Lei for Best Feature and Excellence in Filmmaking at Honolulu Film Festival. La Pura Vida was officially selected at Harlem International Film Festival, Festival Mix Mexico, and El Ojo Cojo Film Festival, won Best Mexican Feature at Rosarito International Film Festival, the Honorable Mention for Best International Narrative Feature at the Williamsburg International Film Festival, Best Self-Funded Film at Cine Pobre Film Festival, Best Feature Film at Paris Art & Movie Awards, and Best Film About Women at New York International Women Festival. His dark fantasy feature film Pégame won Best Mexican Feature at the 2025 Rosarito International Film Festival, and Runner-Up International Feature Film at the Williamsburg International Film Festival, officially selected at the Harlem International Film Festival, and at El Ojo Cojo Film Festival.

Verrechia's documentaries Kumeyaay Land received the 2024 Red Nation Film Award of Excellence for Best Documentary Short at the Red Nation Film Festival, the Environmental, Social, Economic, Political Justice Award for Indigenous America at Latino & Native American Film Festival, Best International Documentary at the 2025 Williamsburg International Film Festival, the Honorable Mention for Best Mexican Documentary at Shorts México, and Kids of the Majestic won Best Feature Children's Advocacy at Artivist Film Festival & Awards, and Directing and Writing Insight Awards of Recognition at the National Association of Film and Digital Media Artists . Helmed by Peter Baxter, Verrechia is one of seven filmmakers to direct hybrid film I Want To Be An American screened at Slamdance. The Laughter of God won the IFCT World Tour Awards for Best Director, Best Actor, and Best Cinematography. With the financial proceeds of his work, Verrechia bought the property "Casa Kurrak" in Baja California, and went on to create the Festival de Cine del Valle de Guadalupe.

== Verrechia Films LLC ==
Verrechia is the founder of Verrechia Films LLC with offices in Brooklyn, New York. The company collaborated on films such as BlackCard directed by Pete Chatmon with Dorian Missick, Simone Missick and Hisham Tawfiq (Black Lives Matter Award at Diversity in Cannes, acquired by HBO), Sega directed by Idil Ibrahim with Alassane Sy (Best Narrative at BlackStar Film Festival, acquired by Canal +), The Weinstein Company presents Rosewood Hotels & Resorts with Verrechia's niece Tessa Gräfin von Walderdorff and Barron Nicholas Hilton II, ABCD: American-Born Confused Desi (2013 film) directed by Martin Prakkat, 2B (film) directed by Rich Kroehling with James Remar and Kevin Corrigan, and Storytelling (film) directed by Todd Solondz with Selma Blair, Paul Giamatti and John Goodman. Verrechia Films LLC participated on documentaries such as 499 (film) directed by Rodrigo Reyes (Golden Frog for Best Docudrama at Camerimage) acquired by The Criterion Collection, The Edge of Democracy directed by Petra Costa for Netflix, The Great Hack directed by Jehane Noujaim, The Price We Pay directed by Harold Crooks for the CBC Television, and Anthrax War directed by Bob Coen for Arte. Verrechia conducted interviews with Akebono Taro, Ken Alibek, Wouter Basson, Beck, Hillary Clinton, Tiger Hattori, Henry Kissinger, Jaron Lanier, Jay-Z, and The Rolling Stones, and collaborated on music videos with artists Wu-Tang, Kanye West, Terence Trent D'Arby, Rihanna, Paul McCartney, Plies, Rae Sremmurd, Migos, Thieves Like Us (band), Nortec Collective, and The Calling.

== Filmography ==
Year	Title	Director	Writer	Producer	Cinematographer
2000	The Laughter of God	Yes	Yes	Yes	No
2000	Payaso Hijueputa de Andrés Baiz	No	No	Yes	No
2001	The Making of Bamboozled by Spike Lee & Sam Pollard	No	No	No	Yes
2001	Storytelling (film) by Todd Solondz (doc)	No	No	No	Yes
2004	Arakimentari by Travis Klose	No	Yes	Yes	No
2007	Tijuana Makes Me Happy	Yes	Yes	Yes	No
2007	Sangre de mi sangre by Chris Zalla	No	No	Yes	No
2009	2B (film) by Richard Kroehling	No	No	No	Yes
2009	Anthrax War by Bob Coen	No	No	No	Yes
2009	Kids of the Majestic	Yes	Yes	Yes	Yes
2010	Tierra madre	Yes	Yes	Yes	Yes
2012	American Florence by Alessio Giorgetti	No	No	No	Yes
2012	The Warrior and the Savior by Sal Sorrentino	No	No	No	Yes
2012	Mansome by Morgan Spurlock	No	No	No	Yes
2013	ABCD: American-Born Confused Desi (2013 film) by Martin Prakkat	No	No	Yes	Yes
2013	I Want To Be an American	Yes	Yes	Yes	Yes
2014	The Price We Pay (2014 film) by Harold Crooks	No	No	No	Yes
2014	The Alley Cat by Marie Ullrich	No	No	Yes	Yes
2015	Henry Kissinger's Secret Negotiations	No	No	Yes	Yes
2015	BlackCard by Pete Chatmon	No	No	Yes	Yes
2015	The Act of Writing with Futura (graffiti artist)	Yes	No	No	Yes
2015	Homecoming by Seko Shamte	No	No	No	Yes
2016	The Rolling Stones: Exhibitionism	Yes	No	No	Yes
2017	A Seed of Maize by Topaz Adizes	No	No	Yes	Yes
2017	The Weinstein Company presents Rosewood Hotels & Resorts	Yes	Yes	Yes	Yes
2018	Sega by Idil Ibrahim	No	No	Yes	Yes
2021	Maya and Her Lover by Nicole Sylvester	No	No	No	Yes
2023	Kumeyaay Land	Yes	Yes	Yes	Yes
2024	La Pura Vida	Yes	Yes	Yes	Yes
2025	Pégame	Yes	Yes	Yes	Yes
