= Pissarek =

Pissarek is an Austrian spelling of the surname Pisarek, Polish occupational surname derived from the occupation of pisarz, 'scribe'.. Notable people with the surname include:

- Margaritha Pissarek – Austrian nurse in South Korea
- Herlinde Pissarek-Hudelist – Austrian theologian and university teacher (1932–1994)
