= Drunk in Public (film) =

- Film poster
- Directed by: David J.Sperling
- Written by: David J.Sperling
- Starring: David J.Sperling; Mark David Allen
- Release dates: February 2007 (Boulder); June 27, 2012 (United States)
- Running time: 80 minutes
- Country: United States
- Language: English

Drunk in Public is a 2007 documentary film by filmmaker and former custody officer, David J. Sperling.

The film spans and chronicles the last 18 years of alcoholic Mark David Allen, a man arrested more than 500 times for alcohol-related incidents.

The documentary starts when Mark David Allen is 33 years old and having already been arrested nearly 100 times.

This film depicts not only Allen's personal struggle and deterioration over the years but also Allen's families, friends and Sperling's effort to find a way to help him.

Mark David Allen was found dead on February 2, 2012, aged 50, due to natural causes.

== Awards ==
2007: Best Editing - Boulder International Film Festival
