= Unity (film) =

- Promotional poster
- Directed by: Shaun Monson
- Written by: Shaun Monson
- Produced by: Melissa Danis; Shaun Monson
- Narrated by: Various
- Edited by: Shaun Monson
- Music by: Yuko Sonoda
- Production company: Nation Earth
- Distributed by: Fathom Events; SpectiCast; The Orchard
- Release date: August 12, 2015
- Running time: 99 minutes
- Country: United States
- Language: English

Unity is a 2015 American documentary film written, directed and produced by Shaun Monson, and the sequel to the 2005 film Earthlings. The film is narrated by one hundred actors, artists, athletes, authors, businessmen, entertainers, filmmakers, military personnel and musicians. The film was released worldwide on August 12, 2015. This is Ryan O'Neal's final film role before his retirement in 2017 and death in 2023.

== Premise ==
The title "Unity" signifies the intention of the content. It's not so much to entertain, like a pastime, but rather turn something "on" inside you that has been suppressed or forgotten by the mask that society or tradition puts upon us. But more than that the film also helps relate us to the mystery of existence, to all of existence, of which we are merely a part.

— Shaun Monson

Unity is a documentary that explores humanity's transformation, presented in five chapters: "Cosmic", "Mind", "Body", "Heart" and "Soul".

== Narrators ==
- Casey Affleck
- Dianna Agron
- Malin Åkerman
- Rick Allen
- Pamela Anderson
- Jennifer Aniston
- Michael Beckwith
- Kristen Bell
- Eve Best
- Fan Bingbing
- Brandon Boyd
- Ellen Burstyn
- Rose Byrne
- Jesse Carmichael
- Jessica Chastain
- Deepak Chopra
- Gregory Colbert
- Common
- David Copperfield
- Marion Cotillard
- Portia de Rossi
- Ellen DeGeneres
- John Paul DeJoria
- David DeLuise
- Emily Deschanel
- Phil Donahue
- Dr. Dre
- Minnie Driver
- Alison Eastwood
- Joel Edgerton
- Claire Forlani
- Arian Foster
- Jorja Fox
- Kathy Freston
- Michael Gambon
- Balthazar Getty
- Jeff Goldblum
- Selena Gomez
- Caroline Goodall
- Maggie Grace
- Adrian Grenier
- Marcia Gay Harden
- Beth Hart
- Rutger Hauer
- Tony Hawk
- Lena Headey
- Mariel Hemingway
- Tom Hiddleston
- Missy Higgins
- Anjelica Huston
- Famke Janssen
- January Jones
- Tony Kanal
- Ben Kingsley
- David LaChapelle
- Cloris Leachman
- Adam Levine
- Isabel Lucas
- Damien Mander
- Arlene Martel
- Tim McIlrath
- Leighton Meester
- Helen Mirren
- Moby
- Matthew Modine
- Carrie-Anne Moss
- Jason Mraz
- Olivia Munn
- Edward James Olmos
- Ryan O'Neal
- Julia Ormond
- Aaron Paul
- Joe Perry
- Joaquin Phoenix
- Freida Pinto
- Maggie Q
- Matthieu Ricard
- Michelle Rodriguez
- Geoffrey Rush
- Zoe Saldana
- Susan Sarandon
- Liev Schreiber
- Nestor Serrano
- Amanda Seyfried
- Martin Sheen
- Russell Simmons
- Sam Simon
- Amy Smart
- Kevin Spacey
- Mark Strong
- Catherine Tate
- Larenz Tate
- Jennifer Tilly
- Shaun Toub
- Paul Watson
- Ben Whishaw
- Persia White
- Kristen Wiig
- Olivia Wilde
- Marianne Williamson
- Anton Yelchin

== Production ==
On June 26, 2013, Shaun Monson started a Kickstarter campaign to complete and market the film, with the goal of reaching "a minimum of $800,000 to complete post-production and release the film within a year", but the fundraising was unsuccessful. Funding was instead secured with the help the film's executive producers: Dieter Paulmann, Alec Pedersen, and Babak Cyrus Razi. After Monson's first installment, Earthlings (2005), he spent roughly seven years developing, writing and producing Unity.

== Release ==
The film is produced by Monson and Melissa Danis with Nation Earth and was distributed by SpectiCast and Fathom Events.

The film was also recorded as an audiobook read by Monson. The audiobook is an unabridged version of the Unity script and is about five hours long.
