= One Water (film) =

2008 film

- A Global Film About Our Changing Relationship to Water
- Directed by: Sanjeev Chatterjee, Ali Habashi
- Written by: Sanjeev Chatterjee
- Produced by: Sanjeev Chatterjee
- Edited by: Ali Habashi
- Music by: Thomas Sleeper
- Release date: February 22, 2008
- Running time: 68 minutes
- Country: United States
- Language: English

One Water is a 2008 documentary film directed by Sanjeev Chatterjee and Ali Habashi. The film premiered at the 2008 Miami International Film Festival on 22 February 2008.

== Film ==
One Water is a collaborative project initiated in 2003 at the University of Miami between the School of Communication, College of Engineering and the Frost School of Music to address the global freshwater crisis. At the heart of the project was the motion picture One Water.

An early short version of the picture was screened at the 12th and 13th sessions of the UN Commission on Sustainable Development in New York. A feature version was completed in 2008 and premiered at the Miami International Film Festival. The 68-minute movie was shot in 14 countries and features long tracts of visual storytelling over music and natural sound without words, interspersed with interviews with prominent people, including the Dalai Lama, Vandana Shiva, Robert Kennedy Jr., Felipe Fernández-Armesto and Oscar Olivera, among others. Donna Shalala, president of the University of Miami, also appears in the film as narrator.

The original score for One Water was recorded in Moscow by the Russian National Orchestra.

In 2006, One Water received major support from the John S. and James L. Knight Foundation as part of its establishment of the Knight Center for International Media at the School of Communication, University of Miami.

The central idea behind the project was the making of a documentary that would spark the creation of further media on the subject of water around the world. Toward this goal, a partnership with San Francisco-based Independent Television Service (ITVS) would create four nationally broadcast films on water in four countries (Bahrain, Colombia, India, and South Africa). These films were to be broadcast in these countries around World Water Day (22 March 2009). This partnership has also launched the International Water Journalism website 1h2o.org that is receiving water related multimedia articles produced by journalists around the world.

In early 2009, an international television version of the film was created with a script written by Sanjeev Chatterjee and narrated by Hollywood star Martin Sheen. Sheen was brought to the project by executive producer, Sam L. Grogg who formerly collaborated with Sheen on the theatrical motion picture Da. This version of the documentary aired on Discovery Networks' Planet Green in August 2010.

In 2016, the Stockholm International Water Institute (SIWI) and UN-Water commissioned director Sanjeev Chatterjee to create a short version on One Water featuring multiple winners of the Water Prize that is awarded each year by SIWI. This version of One Water was screened at the Water Prize celebrations in Stockholm in 2016.

== Theme ==
One Water assesses the deficiency of potable, safe water on a global scale. The movie highlights how communities across the world are dramatically suffering from a lack of our most valuable resource, thanks to drought, pollution and other factors. It becomes apparent that although this issue demands an immediate, workable solution, the problem is not easily resolved. The filmmakers also discuss the vitality of water on parallel spiritual and physical levels.

=== Water crisis ===
A 2006 United Nations report stated that "there is enough water for everyone", but that access to it is hampered by mismanagement and corruption.

The UN World Water Development Report (WWDR, 2003) from the World Water Assessment Program indicates that, in the next 20 years, the quantity of water available to everyone is predicted to decrease by 30 percent. 40 percent of the world's inhabitants currently have insufficient fresh water for minimal hygiene. More than 2.2 million people died in 2000 from waterborne diseases (related to the consumption of contaminated water) or drought. In 2004, the UK charity WaterAid reported that a child dies every 15 seconds from easily preventable water-related diseases.

== Selected awards ==
- Winner, Best of Festival, Columbus International Film and Video Festival, 2009.
- Winner, Best Cinematography Award and Winner, Honorable Mention, Documentary Feature, Fargo Film Festival, 2009.
- Short listed for Awards Jury at 7th Annual Wild and Scenic Environmental Film Festival, Nevada City, California, January 10, 2009.
- Winner, Best Documentary at Foyle Film Festival, The Northern Ireland International Film Festival, 2008, Derry, United Kingdom.
- Winner of Best Feature Environmental Preservation 5th Annual Artivist Film Festival & Awards, 2008, Los Angeles, California
- Winner, Best Film on Sustainable Development at Festival Cinemambiente 2008, Turin, Italy.
- Winner, Honorable Mention Inspirational Excellence Award, Documentary Competition, at Bayou City Inspiration Film Festival, 2008, Houston, Texas.
- Winner of the AMAP Prize, EcoVision Film Festival, 2007 Palermo, Italy.
- Official Program Selection, Agua i Cine, 4th World Water Forum, 2006, Mexico City, Mexico (22 min version)
- Winner of Documentary Award of Excellence and Best of Competition in Technical Merit Broadcast Education Association, Festival of Media Arts, 2004 (22 min version)

== Other selected screenings ==
- INFOBAE – IV Pan-American Internet Communication Encounter, 9 December 2008, Buenos Aires, Argentina.
- Fort Lauderdale International Film Festival, October 15–11 November 2008, Fort Lauderdale, Florida.
- Vancouver International Film Festival, September 25–10 October 2008, Vancouver, BC, Canada.
- Highway Africa Conference, Rhodes University, September 2008, Grahamstown, South Africa.
- Salzburg Academy for Media and Global Change, August 2008, Salzburg, Austria.
- International Forum of Organic Agriculture Movements (IFOAM) Organic World Congress, June 18–20, 2008, Modena, Italy.
- Expo Zaragoza, June 14–14 September 2008, Zaragoza, Spain.
- Miami International Film Festival, 22 February 2008, Miami, Florida.

== See also ==
- 1998 Klang Valley water crisis
- China water crisis
- California Water Wars
- Nature documentary
- Political cinema
