= Unsettled =

- Directed by: Adam Hootnick
- Written by: Adam Hootnick
- Produced by: Adam Hootnick
- Music by: Jon Lee
- Distributed by: Resonance Pictures
- Release date: 2007
- Running time: 80 minutes
- Languages: English; Hebrew

Unsettled is a 2007 documentary feature film written, directed, and produced by Adam Hootnick, depicting the experiences of six young Israeli adults taking part in the Gaza disengagement of August, 2005. Its soundtrack features Matisyahu and other Israeli and Jewish pop music, and original music by Jon Lee.

The movie had a limited theatrical release and received acclaim at numerous film festivals, such as the Florida Film Festival and the Temecula Valley International Film Festival, most notably winning the Grand Jury Prize for Best Documentary Feature at the 2007 Slamdance Film Festival.
