= Nobuyoshi Araki =

Japanese photographer and artist (born 1940)

- Born: May 25, 1940 (age 86); Tokyo, Japan
- Other name: Arākii
- Known for: Photographer and contemporary artist
- Notable work: Over 350 photography books, including Sentimental Journey, Tokyo Lucky Hole, and Shino
- Website: www.arakinobuyoshi.jp

Nobuyoshi Araki (荒木 経惟, Araki Nobuyoshi; born May 25, 1940), professionally known by the mononym Arākii (アラーキー), is a Japanese photographer and contemporary artist. Known primarily for photography that blends eroticism and bondage in a fine art context, he has published over 500 books. (Note: The number depends on such things as how new compilations of previously published are counted. But as of 2005 Kōtarō Iizawa counted 357 in Araki-bon! 1970–2005 (荒木本！ 1970–2005, A Book of Araki Books! 1970–2005) (Tokyo: Bijutsu Shuppansha, 2006; ISBN 4-568-12071-3). Despite the alternative title in English, the book is only in Japanese.)

== Early life and education ==
Araki was born in Tokyo on May 25, 1940. He studied film and photography at Chiba University from 1959, receiving a degree in 1963. He worked at the advertising agency Dentsu, where, in 1968, he met his future wife, the essayist Yōko Aoki.

== Art career ==
Araki is one of the most prolific Japanese artists. Many of his photographs are erotic, straddling a line between art and pornography. Among his photography books are Sentimental Journey (1971), and Tokyo Lucky Hole (1990). Sentimental Journey "1972–1992" is a diary of life with his wife Yōko, who died of ovarian cancer in 1990. The first part of Sentimental Journey shows the couple embarking on married life—their honeymoon and sexual relations. Pictures taken during Yoko's last days were published in Winter Journey.

Parr and Badger include four of Araki's books in the first volume of their photobook history: Zerokkusu Shashincho 24 (Xeroxed Photo Album), Senchimentaru na Tabi (Sentimental Journey), Tokyo Lucky Hole, and Shokuji (The Banquet).

Araki contributed photography to the Sunrise anime series Brain Powerd.

In 1981, Araki directed High School Girl Fake Diary (女高生偽日記, Jokōsei nise nikki), a roman porno film, for the studio Nikkatsu. The film was a disappointment to Araki's fans and to fans of the pink film genre.

The Icelandic musician Björk is an admirer of Araki's work, and served as one of his models. At her request, he photographed the cover and inner sleeve pages of her 1997 remix albumTelegram. More recently, he has photographed pop singer Lady Gaga.

In 2004, an American director, Travis Klose, released a documentary about Araki called Arakimentari, which discusses the artist's lifestyle and work.

Araki was diagnosed with prostate cancer in 2008; he underwent successful surgery to remove the tumor.

In 2010, Araki's cat, Chiro, died of old age.

In October 2013, Araki lost vision in his right eye due to a retinal artery obstruction. The 74-year-old artist used the experience as an inspiration to exhibit Love on the left eye, held on 21 June 2014 at Taka Ishii Gallery, Tokyo.

Commissioned by Italian luxury label Bottega Veneta, Araki photographed Saskia de Brauw and Sung Jin Park in Tokyo for the brand's spring/summer 2015 campaign.

For the European Cultural Centre Araki made in 2018 the limited special edition photo series : “Monstrous Paradise”, representing Araki’s feelings about life in Tokyo.

== Controversy ==
Araki is known for his intimate access to models. When asked about this in 2011, he bragged that he gained access through sex.

In April 2018, Kaori, a model who posed for Araki from 2001 to 2016, wrote a blog post about her relationship with Araki in which she accused him of financial and artistic exploitation. Kaori stated that "she worked without a contract, was forced to take part in explicit shoots in front of strangers, was not regularly paid and that her nude images were often used without her consent." In 2017, when she requested that he stop republishing or exhibiting some photographs of her, Araki wrote to Kaori, warning that she had no rights. She states that the experience led to psychological trauma and ill health. Kaori stated that the Me Too movement had encouraged her to speak out. The accusations have raised questions about the power dynamics between a photographer and his subject. In order to raise awareness of Kaori's claims, the activist group Angry Asian Girls Association protested the opening of an exhibition of photographs by Araki at C/O Berlin December 2018.

== Awards ==
- 1964: Taiyō Prize for photo reportage, Japan.
- 1964: Sun Prize, Japan.
- 1990: Shashin-no-kai Prize from the Photographic Society of Japan
- 1991: 7th Higashikawa Prize.
- 1994: Japan Inter-Design Forum Grand Prix.
- 2008: Austrian Decoration for Science and Art.
- 2012: Top Prize at the 6th ANGO Awards.
- 2012: 54th Mainichi Art Award.
- 2017: Araki was shortlisted for the European Cultural Centre Art Award.

== Publications ==
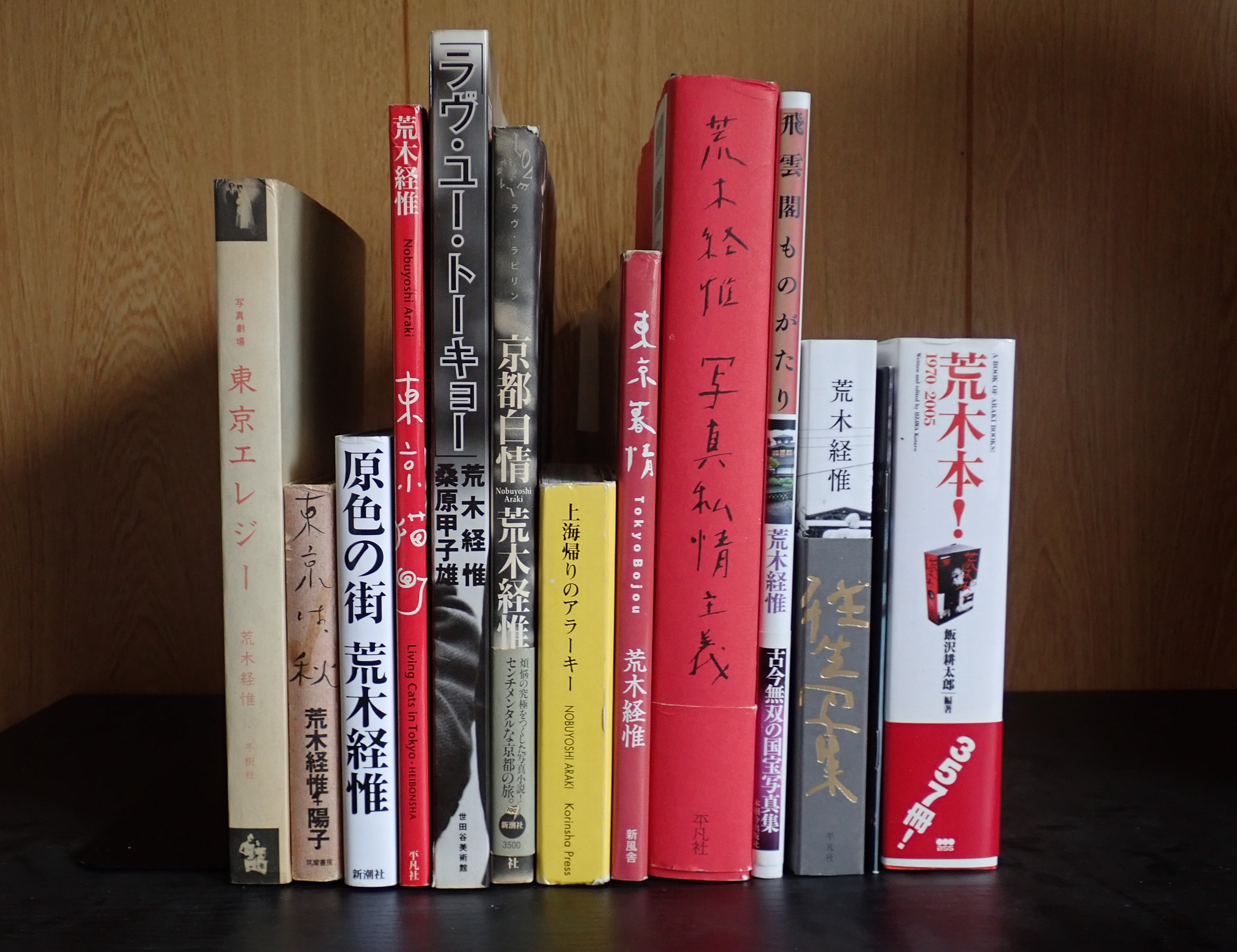
A small percentage of Araki's photobooks (Note: 『東京エレジー』 (Tōkyō erejī, 1981), 『東京は、秋』 (Tōkyō wa, aki, with Yōko Araki, 1992), 『原色の街』 (Genshoku no machi, 1992), 『東京猫町』 (Tōkyō nekomachi = Living Cats in Tokyo, 1993), 『ラブ・ユー・トーキョー』 (Rabu yū Tōkyō = Love You Tokyo, with Kineo Kuwabara, 1993), 『京都白情 ラブ・ラビリンス』 (Kyōto hakujō: Rabu rabirinsu = Love Labyrinth, 1996), 『上海帰りのアラーキー』 (Shanhai kaeri no Arākī, 1998), 『東京暮情』 (Tōkyō bojō = Tokyo bojou, 1999), 『写真私情主義』 (Shashin shijōshugi, 2000), 『飛雲閣ものがたり』 (Hiunkaku monogatari = Hiunkaku Story, 2005), 『往生写集』(Ōjō shashū = Ōjō shashū: Photography for the Afterlife), 『楽園』(Rakuen, 2011),『荒木本！1970–2005』 (Arakibon! 1970–2005 = A Book of Araki Books! 1970–2005, 2006). The last, edited by Kōtarō Iizawa, has an obi that reads 「357冊！」, i.e. "357 books!".)

- Zerokkusu Shashincho 1–25 = Xeroxed Photo Album 1–25. A series of books self-produced using a photocopier, published from 1970 onwards, each in an edition of 70 copies.
- Senchimentaru na Tabi. = Sentimental Journey.
  - Senchimentaru na Tabi. Tokyo: self-published, 1971. Title and text in Japanese. 100 black and white photographs.
  - Sentimental Journey. Tokyo: Kawade Shobo Shinsha, 2016. ISBN 978-4-309-27700-4. Facsimile edition. With an introduction in Japanese and English by Araki. Housed in a slipcase with a postcard.
- Tokyo Lucky Hole.
  - Tokyo Lucky Hole 1983–1985 Shinjuku Kabuki-cho district. Tokyo: Ohta Shuppan, 1990. 272 pages.
  - Tokyo Lucky Hole. Cologne: Taschen. With texts by Akira Suei and Akihito Yasumi translated into English, French and German. 704 pages. 1997, ISBN 9783822881897; 2005, ISBN 9783822846810; 2015, ISBN 9783836556385.
- Shokuji = The Banquet. Tokyo: Magazine House, 1993. 32 black and white and 28 colour photographs. With a text by Araki.
- Self, Life, Death. New York: Phaidon, 2005. Edited by Akiko Miki. ISBN 9780714845555.
- Photography for the Afterlife. Tokyo: Heibonsha, 2014. ISBN 978-4582278118. With an essay by Mario Perniola, "Araki's Hell".
- Tokyo. Munich: Pinakothek der Moderne; Only Photography, 2017. 28 diptychs. With essays. Edition of 300 copies.
- Araki by Araki (in English, French, and German). Cologne: Taschen. 2014. ISBN 978-3836551120. OCLC 917170400. A 560-page retrospective survey of Araki's body of work selected by the artist.
- Monstrous Paradise. Personal Structures Art Projects #11. European Cultural Centre, 2018. ISBN 978-90-829434-0-5.

== Films ==
=== Films by Araki ===
- High School Girl Fake Diary (女高生偽日記, Jokōsei nise nikki) (1981)
- Ai no Shinsekai (愛の新世界, Ai no Shinsekai) (1994)
- Flower Rondo 3 (2002) – documentary short
- Flower Rondo 4: Kakyoku (2003) – documentary short
- Painting Flowers in the Sky Over the Balcony (2004) – documentary
- Fuyuharu (2004) – documentary short

=== Films about Araki ===
- A Live DVD Araki Overseas 1997 – 2000 (2002) – documentary
- Arakimentari (2004) – documentary directed by Travis Klose and produced by Troopers Films (Regis Trigano and Dylan Verrechia).

=== Films based on Araki's life ===
- Tokyo Biyori (1997) – a biographical drama based on the life of Yoko Araki, the wife of Nobuyoshi Araki. Written by Nobuyoshi Araki and Ryo Iwamatsu, and directed by Naoto Takenaka. The Araki couple were portrayed by Naoto Takenaka and Miho Nakayama. Araki makes a cameo as a train conductor.

== Exhibitions ==
- 2005: Araki, Anton Kern Gallery, New York City.
- 2006: Implosion (Ten Year Anniversary), Anton Kern Gallery, New York City.
- 2008: Friends and Family, Anton Kern Gallery, New York City.
- 2009: Araki, Anton Kern Gallery, New York City.
- 2010: Exposed: Voyeurism, Surveillance, and the Camera Since 1870, San Francisco Museum of Modern Art, San Francisco
- 2015: The Pistils Waltz, Gallery 51, Antwerp.
- 2018: The Incomplete Araki, Museum of Sex, New York City
- 2018: Nobuyoshi Araki: KATA-ME, Rat Hole Gallery
- 2018: Nobuyoshi Araki: Monstrous Paradise, RuArts Gallery, Moscow
- 2022: Nobuyoshi Araki: Hanaguruma, Hamiltons Gallery, London

== Collections ==
Araki's work is held in the following permanent public collections:

- Israel Museum, Jerusalem
- Tate, London
- San Francisco Museum of Modern Art, San Francisco, CA
- Museum of Contemporary Art, Chicago
- Art Institute of Chicago
- The National Science and Media Museum, Bradford, UK
- The Stedelijk Museum, Amsterdam
- Museum für Moderne Kunst, Frankfurt
- Goetz Collection, Munich, Germany
