= Robert Koenig (filmmaker) =

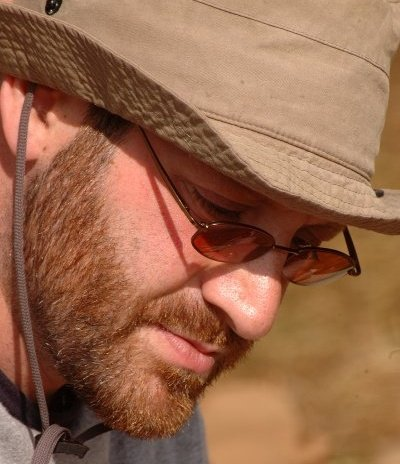
- Koenig during the filming of Returned: Child Soldiers of Nepal's Maoist Army (2007)
- Born: Robert Alexander Koenig Jr. July 9, 1975 (age 51); Honesdale, Pennsylvania, U.S.
- Education: University of Pittsburgh and Pittsburgh Filmmakers
- Occupations: Filmmaker, producer, communications executive, and nonprofit leader
- Years active: 1999–present
- Known for: Returned: Child Soldiers of Nepal's Maoist Army; Coexist; HeartMind International

Robert "Bob" Koenig (born July 9, 1975) is an American film director, producer, writer and editor. Koenig directed the documentary film "Returned: Child Soldiers of Nepal's Maoist Army", which won the 2008 Artivist Award for Child Advocacy and produced "Coexist", which was nominated for Best Documentary Film by the Africa Movie Academy Awards (AMAA) in 2011. In 2014, Koenig co-founded HeartMind International, a nonprofit organization focused on expanding access to culturally appropriate mental health care in South Asia. He currently serves as Creative Services Manager for Maxim Healthcare.

== Early life ==
Robert Koenig grew up in Hawley, Pennsylvania and graduated from the Wallenpaupack Area School District in 1993. Koenig attended the University of Pittsburgh and Pittsburgh Filmmakers to study filmmaking; he graduated in 1998.

== Early career ==
In 1999, Robert Koenig directed his first documentary, "The Wrestler's Second: The Story of Mongolia's Struggle with Yadargaa", in Ulan Bator, Mongolia. The documentary follows a Mongolian man who is diagnosed with mysterious disease called Yadargaa. The film documents his attempts to find a cure while traveling through the Gobi Desert.

After Koenig returned from living Mongolia for most of 1999, he started working at WCJB-TV in Gainesville, FL. During his time at WCJB-TV, he produced and edited the documentary style show "Police Beat" from 2000 to 2003.

In 2003, Koenig moved to Atlanta, Georgia where he worked in public broadcasting, WPBA, and as a special projects producer for WGCL-TV (CBS46) and WXIA-TV (11 Alive). He was nominated for an Emmy Award for his work on the "Georgia Aquarium's Fun Fish Facts" series in 2007.

== Documentary Films ==
In 2007, Robert Koenig teamed up with medical anthropologist, Brandon Kohrt to document the stories of several child soldiers who were associated with the Unified Communist Party of Nepal. "Returned: Child Soldiers of Nepal's Maoist Army" tells the personal story of Nepali boys and girls as they attempt to rebuild their lives after fighting a Maoist revolution. Through the voices of former child soldiers, the film examines why these children joined the Maoists and explores the prevention of future recruitment.

In 2009, Koenig produced "Coexist" a documentary film that was shot in Rwanda and tells the stories of trauma survivors searching for ways to coexist with their loved ones' murderers. Koenig also served as Field Producer during production of "Coexist" in Rwanda and continued to serve as the story consultant while the documentary was in post-production. "Coexist" premiered in Boston in November 2010 and in March 2011, "Coexist" was nominated for Best Documentary Film by the Africa Movie Academy Awards (AMAA). For the 20th anniversary of the genocide in Rwanda, "Coexist" aired on PBS’s World Channel on April 16, 2014 and was reviewed by The New York Times .

== Philanthropy ==
In 2014, Robert Koenig along with Brandon Kohrt and Libby King MacFarlane founded HeartMind International, a public charity (501(c)(3)) with the mission to provide culturally-appropriate and sustainable mental health care to vulnerable populations. After the April 2015 Nepal earthquake, HeartMind International implemented its earthquake response plan by offering psychological first aid training for first responders, community health workers, and NGO workers through Transcultural Psychosocial Organization (TPO-Nepal).

== Later Career ==
Following his documentary filmmaking work, Koenig transitioned into creative leadership roles in healthcare communications and marketing. In 2014, he joined Maxim Healthcare, where he held positions including Video Producer, Video Production Manager, and Creative Services Manager.

In addition to his corporate work, Koenig served as an adjunct professor in the Department of Electronic Media and Film at Towson University. His teaching focused on media production and documentary storytelling.

Koenig continues to serve as a director of HeartMind International while overseeing brand, video, and national event production initiatives for Maxim Healthcare.

== Filmography ==
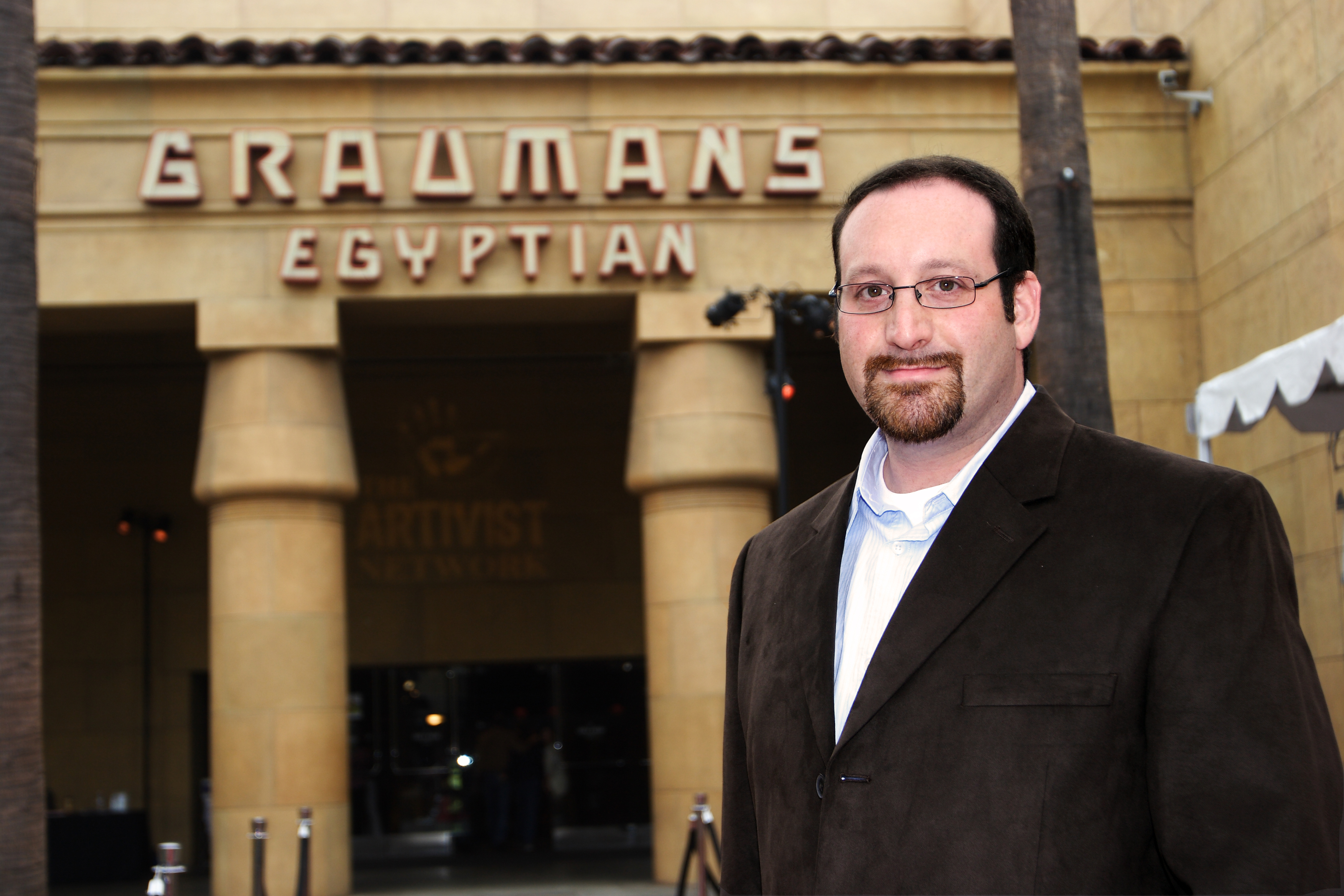
Robert Koenig at the 2008 Artivist Film Festival & Awards

=== Director/Writer/Producer ===
- Returned: Child Soldiers of Nepal's Maoist Army (2008)
- The Wrestler's Second: The Story of Mongolia's Struggle with Yadargaa (2008)
- Returned (2009)

=== Producer ===
- Coexist (2009)
- People Will Talk TV (2013)
- Coexist (2014)

== Awards and Recognition ==
Year	Award	Work
2007	Regional Emmy Award nomination	Georgia Aquarium's Fun Fish Facts
2008	Artivist Award for Child Advocacy	Returned: Child Soldiers of Nepal's Maoist Army
2011	Africa Movie Academy Awards nomination for Best Documentary Film	Coexist (producer)
2014	Human Rights Service Award (Nepal)	Heart Mind International

== Bibliography ==
Robert Koenig has published articles and photos including:

- Child Soldiers, Edited by Leora Kahn • ISBN 978-1-57687-455-4 (2008)
- Child Soldiers after War, by Robert Koenig and Brandon Kohrt (published in Anthropology News, May 2009)
- Koenig, R and Kohrt, B (2012). Black Water (safe water education; Nepal). In E Mendenhall and A Koon (Eds), "Environmental Health Narratives: A Reader for Youth" UNM Press 2012 • ISBN 978-0826351661 (2012)
- Heal Thy Neighbor, by Bruce Bower, still images and captions by Robert Koenig (published in Science News, November 29, 2013)
- Koenig, R, Kohrt, B and Kohrt, H (2015). Following the Money in Mongolia. In Gillian H. Ice; Darna L. Dufour And Nancy J. Stevens (Eds), "Disasters in Field Research "Atla Mira Press, division of Rowman & Littlefield Publishers 2015 • ISBN 978-0-7591-1801-0(2015)
