= Eli Rarey =

Eli Rarey is an independent filmmaker based in New York City. He wrote and directed the feature film The Famous Joe Project which was premiered at Outfest in 2012. His short film by the same name (on which the feature is based) premiered at the 2007 Slamdance Film Festival and won Best International Short Film at the Lisbon Village International Digital Cinema Festival. His interactive feature film on YouTube, Hard Decisions, offers the viewer 11 possible endings. The project was made in collaboration with activist Brenden Shucart and funded with a successful kickstarter campaign.

His short film Pigeon, based on the play The Seagull by Anton Chekhov, was nominated for Best Dramatic Short at Berlin Scifi Film Festival. The film stars Zuzanna Szadkowski, who studied theater at Columbia University with Rarey when they were both undergraduates. Szadkowski and Rarey were reunited, again in an adaptation of Chekhov's play, when he wrote the play Seagull: True Story, directed by Aleksandr Molochnikov, which premiered at La Mama ETC in 2025 as part of the Under the Radar Festival and later went on to a run at The Public Theater.

Rarey is a founding member of Science Project experimental performance collective. He wrote and performed with them in New York City from 2000 to 2002.

He is a graduate of USC School of Cinematic Arts, where he also taught in the Interactive Media Division.
