= Cesar Velasco Broca =

Spanish filmmaker (born 1978)

César Velasco Broca
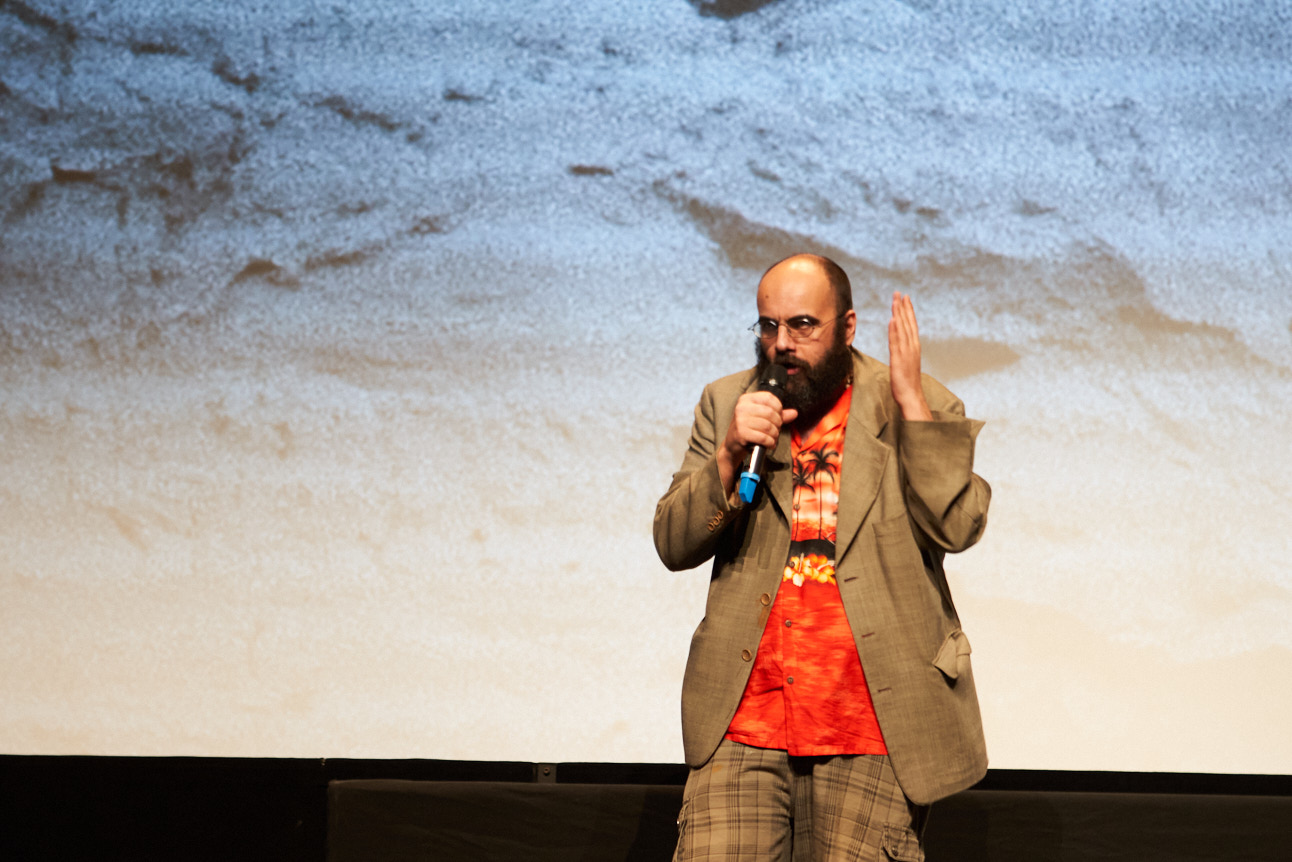
- Presenting the short Alegrías riojanas at the San Sebastián Fantasy and Horror Film Festival in October 2022
- Born: 1978 (age 47–48); Amurrio, Spain
- Other name: Regis Muskiz

César Velasco Broca (born 1978) is a Spanish cult filmmaker. He was born in Amurrio, province of Álava. He earned a licentiate degree in audiovisual communication from the Complutense University of Madrid. In addition to his film works, he has also worked as a lecturer on Film Aesthetics at the ECAM.

In 2026, he began shooting his debut feature, El futuro testamento, a Spanish-Estonian-Italian international co-production starring Àlex Brendemühl, Mireia Oriol, and Ariadna Gil.

== Selected filmography ==
- Footsy. Short film. 8 mm.
- Las aventuras galácticas de Jaime de Funes y Arancha. Television pilot. DV.
- Der Milchshorf. La Costra Láctea. Short film. 16 mm (2002)
- Kinky Hoodoo Voodoo.Saturno al final del verano. Short film. 16 mm (2004)
- Avant Petalos Grillados. Short film. 16 mm (2006)
- Transharmonic Nights. 35 mm (as of 2006, in production)

== Awards and nominations ==
- Kinky Hoodoo Voodoo was presented in three events in Spain.
- Avant Petalos Grillados was presented in 20 events, including (in each case, at least) 10 in Spain, four elsewhere in Europe, the Canadian Film Centre Worldwide Short Film Festival, and, in the United States, these four:
  - Slamdance 2007 (where it won the Grand Jury Award for Best Experimental Short)
  - Maryland Film Festival
  - CineVegas
  - Milwaukee International Film Festival
