= Pisarek =

Pisarek is a Polish occupational surname derived from the occupation of pisarz, 'scribe'. Notable people with the surname include:

- Avraham Pisarek (1901–1983), German photographer
- Kasia Pisarek, Polish art expert
- Maciej Pisarek (born 1966), Polish film director and screenplay writer
- Marian Pisarek (1912–1942), Polish fighter pilot and flying ace of World War II
