= Seoul Train =

- Directed by: Jim Butterworth; Lisa Sleeth; Aaron Lubarsky
- Produced by: Jim Butterworth; Lisa Sleeth
- Starring: Chun Ki-won; Moon Kook-han; Suzanne Scholte; Tim A. Peters; Marine Buissonnière; Ron Redmond; Norbert Vollertsen; Sam Brownback
- Edited by: Aaron Lubarsky
- Music by: David Harris
- Production companies: Naked Edge Films; Incite Productions
- Distributed by: PBS
- Release date: November 5, 2004 (AFI Fest)
- Running time: 54 minutes
- Country: United States
- Languages: English; Korean; Mandarin

Seoul Train is a 2004 documentary film that deals with the dangerous journeys of North Korean refugees as they escape through China to find refuge. These journeys are both dangerous and daring since, if caught, they face forced repatriation, torture, and possible execution. The North Koreans are aided by a loose band of activists who have formed an "underground railroad" of safe houses and escape routes to evade the authorities and North Korean agents.

Seoul Train was broadcast on television in more than 22 countries around the world, including on the PBS series Independent Lens. In January 2007, Seoul Train was awarded the Alfred I. duPont – Columbia University Silver Baton for excellence in broadcast journalism (broadcast equivalent of the Pulitzer Prize). In April 2007, Seoul Train was named runner-up in the National Journalism Awards.

The film was produced, directed, and filmed by Jim Butterworth, a technology entrepreneur in Colorado in the United States, and Lisa Sleeth of Incite Productions. Seoul Train was co-directed and edited by Aaron Lubarsky, a documentary filmmaker in New York City.

Butterworth and Sleeth lived in a safe house on the China-North Korea border while shooting the film, and used that as a base to cross into North Korea for part of the filming. On March 17, 2009, North Korean soldiers apprehended reporters Euna Lee and Laura Ling while filming a documentary for Current TV. Lee and Ling were apprehended as they attempted to retrace the footsteps of Butterworth and Sleeth. Lee wrote in her book The World Is Bigger Now: An American Journalist's Release from Captivity in North Korea ... A Remarkable Story of Faith, Family, and Forgiveness how Seoul Train had motivated her and how she jumped at the chance to do a similar story. North Korean authorities interrogated Lee and Ling about watching Seoul Train.

== Awards ==
- 2007 Alfred I. duPont – Columbia University Awards — Silver Baton for excellence in broadcast journalism.
- 2007 National Journalism Awards — Runner-up, Jack R. Howard award for excellence in electronic media/TV-cable.
- 2006 INPUT: International Public Television Screening Conference (Taipei, Taiwan)
- 2005 ONE WORLD – Priština Film Festival (Priština, Kosovo) — Winner, Jury Award for Best Film.
- 2005 Libertas – Dubrovnik Film Festival (Dubrovnik, Croatia)
  - Winner, Audience Award for Best Film.
  - Winner, Jury Award for Best Documentary.
- 2005 Crested Butte Reel Fest (Crested Butte, Colorado)
  - Winner, Audience Award for Best Film.
  - Winner, Silver Award (Jury) for Best Documentary.
- 2005 Brooklyn Film Festival (Brooklyn, NY) — Winner, Independent Spirit Award (Jury).
- 2005 Jackson Hole Film Festival (Jackson, Wyoming) — Winner, Best Global Insight Film (Jury).
- 2005 Artivist Film Festival (Los Angeles, CA) — Winner, Jury Award for Best Human Rights Documentary
- 2005 Texas Film Festival — Winner, Audience Award for Best Documentary.
- 2005 Milan International Film Festival (Milan, Italy) — Winner, Jury Award for Best Editing.
- 2005 Big Sky Documentary Film Festival (Missoula, Montana) — Finalist, Jury Award for Best Short Documentary
- 2005 Boulder International Film Festival (Boulder, Colorado) — Winner, Jury Award for Best Documentary.
- 2004 Ft. Lauderdale Int’l Film Festival (Fort Lauderdale, Florida) — Winner, Jury Award for Best Documentary.

== See also ==
- The Defector: Escape from North Korea
- Escaping North Korea by Mike Kim
