= Neverthought Films =

Neverthought Films is an independent video production company created in 2003 by Danny Bourque. The name was inspired by his first short film, Neverthought, which was completed in 2001 and went on to screen at the Reel Teens Film Festival in New York City. The first film to bear the label "Neverthought Films" was the short film Hitchhiker, which premiered at the Edgeworks Short Film Festival in Corpus Christi, Texas, in 2003 and went on to win the Performing Arts - Filmmaking scholarship sponsored by Golden Key.

Neverthought Films logo

The film Chthonia won first place at the 2005 Broadcast Educators Association Festival for a short film script and also won the Best Narrative Film award at Sul Ross State University's WestFest 5 Film Festival.

Commode Creations won the 2007 Slamdance Film Festival's Global Audience Award and aired in its entirety on the Independent Film Channel.

In addition to independent filmmaking, Neverthought Films also produces short corporate videos and television commercials. One such commercial, "Richard Spacey Saves the Day," won Neverthought Films two Telly Awards in 2007.
