= Incite Productions =

Incite Productions, or Incite Productions Inc., is a 501(c)(3) nonprofit documentary production company based in Boulder, Colorado. It is the producer of Seoul Train, the critically acclaimed PBS documentary on North Korean refugees. Members of the board of Incite Productions are Jim Butterworth and Lisa Sleeth.

Incite's IRS ruling year was 2003, and its EIN is 61-1453985.
