= Earthlings (film) =

2005 US documentary film by Shaun Monson

- Festival poster
- Directed by: Shaun Monson
- Produced by: Libra Max; Brett Harrelson; Maggie Q Persia White
- Narrated by: Joaquin Phoenix
- Cinematography: Mark M. Rissi
- Edited by: Shaun Monson
- Music by: Moby; Libra Max; Brian Carter; Natalie Merchant; Gabriel Mounsey; Barry Wood
- Distributed by: Nation Earth
- Release date: September 24, 2005
- Running time: 95 minutes
- Country: United States
- Language: English

Earthlings is a 2005 American documentary film about humanity's use of non-human animals as pets, food, clothing, entertainment, and for scientific research. The film is narrated by Joaquin Phoenix, features music by Moby, and was directed by Shaun Monson, executive produced by Libra Max and co-produced by Maggie Q. A sequel titled Unity was released in 2015.

== Synopsis ==
Covering factory farms, pet stores, puppy mills, animal experimentation, Earthlings includes footage obtained through the use of hidden cameras to chronicle the day-to-day practices of some of the largest industries in the world, all of which rely on animals. Then, the film draws parallels between speciesism and racism, sexism, and more.

== Production ==
The film started off as footage that writer, director, and producer Shaun Monson had shot at animal shelters around Los Angeles in 1999. Monson originally shot the footage for PSAs on spaying and neutering pets, but what he saw moved him so much that he turned it into a documentary. The film would take another six years to complete because of the difficulty of obtaining footage within these industries.

== Promotion ==
Joaquin Phoenix commented on the documentary, "Of all the films I have ever made, this is the one that gets people talking the most. For every one person who sees Earthlings, they will tell three." Animal rights philosopher Tom Regan remarked, "For those who watch Earthlings, the world will never be the same."

== Accolades ==
In 2005, Earthlings premiered at the Artivist Film Festival (where it won Best Documentary Feature), followed by the Boston International Film Festival (where it won the Best Content Award) and the San Diego Film Festival (where it won Best Documentary Film, as well as the Humanitarian Award to Phoenix for his work on the film).

== Connection to the Lutsk hostage crisis ==
On July 21, 2020, Maksym Kryvosh seized a bus with 13 people on board in the city of Lutsk, Volyn Oblast, Ukraine, and demanded, among other things, that President of Ukraine Volodymyr Zelenskyy publish a post in which he recommended Earthlings to everyone. Within a few hours, Zelenskyy fulfilled Kryvosh's demand, posting a Facebook video in which he said in Russian, "Everyone should watch the 2005 film Earthlings." Kryvosh then released three hostages. After a standoff with police, Kryvosh was arrested, the other 10 hostages were released, all unharmed, and the President's recommendation video was deleted.

The next day, Shaun Monson reacted to the incident by saying that "Earthlings does not endorse or condone acts of terror, as its message is one of compassion for all beings. [...] Our hearts go out to all those impacted by this ordeal, to their families, as well as the authorities who ensured that no lives were lost. May we move forward with non-violence toward all."

== See also ==
- List of vegan and plant-based media
