= Returned: Child Soldiers of Nepal's Maoist Army =

- Theatrical release poster
- Directed by: Robert Koenig
- Produced by: Robert Koenig; Brandon Kohrt
- Cinematography: Scott Ippolito
- Edited by: Robert Koenig
- Music by: Harris Bierhoff
- Distributed by: Documentary Educational Resources
- Release date: 2008
- Running time: 56 minutes
- Country: United States
- Language: English

Returned: Child Soldiers of Nepal's Maoist Army is a 2008 documentary film directed by American filmmaker Robert Koenig, and written by Robert Koenig and Brandon Kohrt. The documentary premiered in Hollywood, CA at Grauman's Egyptian Theatre in 2008 at the 5th Annual Artivist Film Festival, where it won the Artivist Award for Children's Advocacy. Returned also won the award for Best Documentary Short at the Atlanta Underground Film Festival that same year.

== Synopsis ==
Returned: Child Soldiers of Nepal's Maoist Army tells the personal story of Nepali boys and girls as they attempt to rebuild their lives after fighting in the Nepalese Civil War. Through the voices of former child soldiers, the film examines why these children joined the Maoists and explores the prevention of future recruitment.

The children describe their dramatic recruitment and participation in the Maoist People’s Liberation Army during the eleven-year civil war between the Maoist insurgents and the Hindu monarch of Nepal. The girls’ stories demonstrate how voluntarily joining the violent Maoist struggle became their only option to escape the gender discrimination and sexual violence of traditional Hindu culture in Nepal. With the major conflict ended and the Maoists in control of the government, these children are now in United Nations cantonments, and return home to communities and families that want nothing to do with them. For many of the children of Nepal’s Maoist Army, the return home can be even more painful than the experience of war.

== Accolades ==
- "Best Short, Children's Advocacy" 5th Annual Artivist Film Festival, 2008
- "Best Student Work" Society for Visual Anthropology Film Festival, 2008
- "Best Documentary Short" Atlanta Underground Film Festival, 2008
- CARE Film Festival, Johannesburg, South Africa, 2008
- Himalayan Film Festival, Amsterdam, 2009
- Document 7 - International Human Rights Documentary Film Festival, Scotland, 2009
- United States National Academy of Sciences Institute of Medicine
- Days of Ethnographic Film, Moscow, Russia, 2009
- Association for Asian Studies Annual Meeting, Philadelphia, PA, 2010
- Anthropology Film Festival at UBC, Vancouver, Canada, 2010

== See also ==
- Military use of children
- Unified Communist Party of Nepal (Maoist)
- Prachanda
