= Arakimentari =

- Directed by: Travis Klose
- Produced by: Jason Fried
- Starring: Nobuyoshi Araki; Takeshi Kitano; Björk; Richard Kern
- Edited by: Akiko Iwakawa-Grieve; Masako Tsumura
- Music by: DJ Krush
- Distributed by: Troopers Films
- Release date: 2004
- Running time: 85 minutes
- Country: United States
- Languages: English; Japanese

Arakimentari is a 2004 American documentary film directed by Travis Klose, produced by Jason Fried, about acclaimed and controversial Japanese photographer Nobuyoshi Araki. The film looks at Araki's personal life as well as his art. Arakimentari won Best Score for DJ Krush's music, and Audience Award for Best Documentary at the Brooklyn Film Festival.

== Cast ==
- Nobuyoshi Araki as himself
- Björk as herself
- Richard Kern as himself
- Takeshi Kitano as himself

== Reception ==
On review aggregator website Rotten Tomatoes, the film holds an approval rating of 55% based on 11 reviews, with an average rating of 6.2/10.
