= Adam Hootnick =

- Born: Adam Hootnick
- Education: Harvard Law School
- Occupations: Director; producer
- Known for: What Carter Lost, Unsettled, Son of the Congo, Judging Jewell

Adam Hootnick is a director and producer of film, television, and other short-form content. His work includes What Carter Lost, UNSETTLED, Destination: Team USA, Son of the Congo, Judging Jewell, and Pro Day. He is currently developing his first narrative feature film.

== Career ==
=== Early career ===
Hootnick's creative career began with news production positions at NBC and MSNBC in the US and Israel, including work with NBC legal correspondent Dan Abrams and NBC Tel Aviv correspondent Martin Fletcher. He worked as a producer at MTV News & Documentaries covering politics and international affairs worldwide, including news and documentary segments and specials tied to the Iraq War, Supreme Court decisions on gay rights and affirmative action, and the 2004 and 2008 US Presidential elections.

=== Documentaries ===
Hootnick's first feature, UNSETTLED, follows several young Israelis during the 2005 withdrawal of Israeli settlements and troops from Gaza. UNSETTLED won numerous awards, including the Grand Jury Prize for Best Documentary Feature at the Slamdance Film Festival.

He directed What Carter Lost, which tells the story of the Dallas Carter Cowboys, one of the most talented teams in high school football history, and their dominating 1988 season in Texas, as famously portrayed in the film Friday Night Lights. The documentary, named one of the year's best documentaries by Sports Illustrated, was Hootnick's second film for ESPN's Oscar and Emmy Award-winning 30 for 30 series. His first 30 for 30 film, "Judging Jewell," told the story of Richard Jewell, the security guard wrongly accused of bombing the 1996 Atlanta Olympics, and was rated among the top films in the history of the series by Rolling Stone Magazine.

Produced in conjunction with Grantland and Executive Producer Bill Simmons, Hootnick's "Son of the Congo" premiered at the 2015 South by Southwest Film Festival. The film follows Serge Ibaka, who was born and grew up in the Republic of the Congo before he was drafted to the NBA.

Hootnick also collaborated with ESPN to direct the short films "Pro Day" and "The Outstanding Mind-Bending Basketball Synergy Machine".

His project for United Airlines and Tribeca Studios, Destination: Team USA, follows five Olympic hopefuls as they compete for spots on the 2016 Olympic team.

He founded and continues to run Resonance Story Company, a production company specializing in branded documentaries for clients in various sectors including health care, financial services, and consumer products.

=== Commercial directing ===
As a commercial director, Hootnick's recent work includes NASCAR's tribute to Jeff Gordon, "One Last Time Around", as well as projects for United Airlines, Facebook, Tylenol, and the Clinton Foundation.

=== Music videos ===
Hootnick's first music video was the Webby Awards-honoree "Shoeshine" with Brooklyn rock band Black Taxi.

== Personal life ==
Hootnick graduated from Harvard College and Harvard Law School, and is currently based in Austin, Texas.
