= Rodes Rollins =

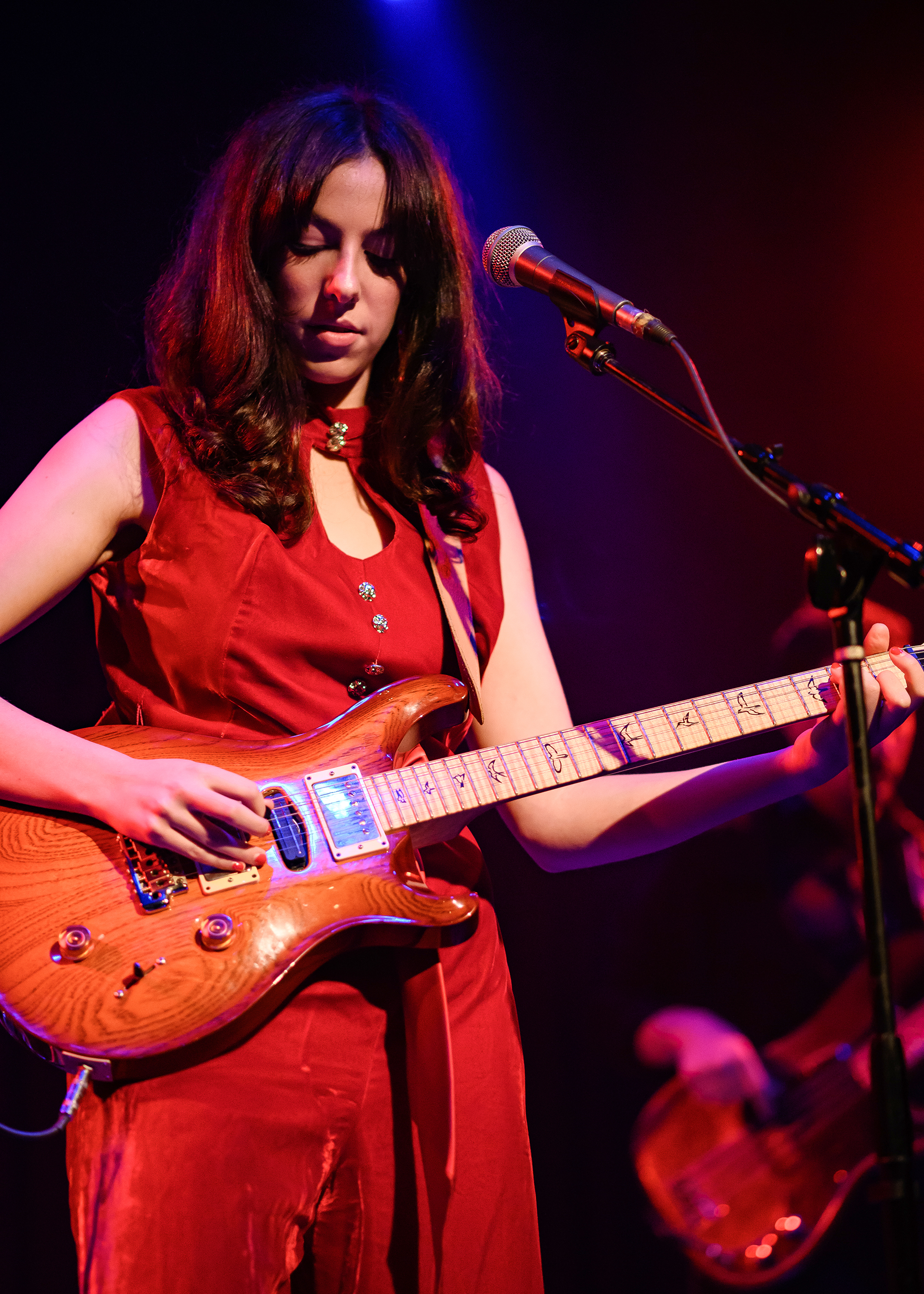
- Rollins in 2018

Talia Leah Taxman (born 1 November 1994), known professionally as Rodes Rollins is an American singer-songwriter from Boulder, CO who is currently based in Brooklyn, NY but also spends time in LA and Mexico City. She calls her Americana, pop-esque music “cowboy poetry” and Billboard has referred to her sound as “part spaghetti western, part psychedelic.”

She released her debut EP "Young Adult", which was produced by Alex Goose, in 2016. One song from the EP, 'Wes Come Back,' was featured on the CW's Riverdale.

Rollins has collaborated with Stella Mozgawa, Matthew Compton of Electric Guest, Kane Ritchotte (formerly of Portugal. The Man), and Greg Rogove. She was also featured in Branko’s “Out of Sight (So Right).”

Rollins studied Cultural Iconography at NYU Gallatin School of Individualized Study.
