= Shaun Monson =

American film director

- Occupations: Film director; film producer

Shaun Monson is an American film director and producer and activist for animal rights and environmentalism. He wrote, directed, and produced the 2005 documentary Earthlings, which covers animal rights issues within industries such as pets, food, fashion, entertainment, and animal testing.

Monson is a founding partner of Nation Earth, the production company responsible for Earthlings. Monson made a follow-up to Earthlings called Unity which explores the unifying force of consciousness found in humans, animals, and nature.

Monson became a vegetarian in the mid-1990s and vegan shortly thereafter. He lives in Malibu, California, near Los Angeles.

== Filmography ==
Year	Title	Director	Writer	Producer	Co-Producer
2000	Bad Actors	Yes	No	No	
2001	Holy War, Un-Holy Victory	Yes	Yes	No	
2005	Earthlings	Yes	Yes	Yes	
2015	Unity	Yes	Yes	Yes	
2018	Dominion (2018 film)				Yes
2020	There was a Killing				
2021	Indigo	Yes			

== See also ==
- List of animal rights advocates
