= Maciej Pisarek =

Polish director and screenplay writer

Maciej Pisarek (born 8 November 1966 in Kraków) is a Polish director and screenplay writer.

He made some documentaries – among others "Solo", about composer Bogusław Schaeffer.

He independently produced a short feature "Waves. Day Return" ("Fale. Wyjazd"). It was later bought by the Polish Television and selected to competition by important festivals like Avignon, 'Message To Man' in Sankt Petersburg, Slamdance and many others.

The thriller "Izolator", based on his own script, was to be his feature fiction debut. The film however was directed by a cinematographer, Christopher Doyle. Pisarek did not agree to leave his name among credits of that movie because of the production changes which ruined form and meaning of the original screenplay.

He worked in different commercial and TV forms - for example music video of Rojek’s and Smolik's "Another Beautiful Day" (Olympic Anthem) or narrative documentary “Defence Of Jasna Gora”, with Daniel Olbrychski. Moreover, American NBC has put Pisarek’s commercial in a prestigious program titled: "The Best Commercials You’ve Never Seen".

He publishes his selected works, mainly writing, on his site, BING BONG.

== Selected films (director and writer) ==
2014 – "Dżej Dżej" (86 min.)

2008 – „Solo” (doc., 55 min.)

2006 – „Fale. Wyjazd” (Eng. „Waves. Day Return”; fic., 26 min.)

== Selected awards ==
2009 – “Solo” - Grand Prize, Festival International du Film sur l’Art, Montreal

2008 – “Solo” - Main Jury Award, Music On Film Film On Music, Prague

2007 – “Waves. Day Return” - Special Jury Remi, WorldFest, Houston
