= Jim Butterworth (entrepreneur) =

American filmmaker

Jim Butterworth is an American technology entrepreneur, documentary filmmaker, and former investment banker and venture capitalist. He is the president and founder of Naked Edge Films, which has produced more than thirty documentaries that have won an Oscar, two Alfred I. duPont Silver Batons, a Peabody, and have been nominated for six Emmys. He also is the co-founder of the nonprofit documentary production company Incite Productions, and a director and producer of the award-winning film Seoul Train. He is the inventor of 53 U.S. and foreign patents in the field of streaming media that are generally considered among the most cited and relevant intellectual property with respect to streaming.

In 2007, he was awarded the Dartmouth College Martin Luther King Jr. Social Justice Award. In 2008, he was inducted into the Georgia Tech College of Engineering Academy of Distinguished Engineering Alumni. He formerly served on the Georgia Tech Advisory Board and is a Member Emeritus of the Georgia Tech ISyE Advisory Board.

== Early life and education ==
Butterworth graduated from Leon High School, the Georgia Institute of Technology with a bachelor's degree in Industrial and Systems Engineering, and from the Tuck School of Business at Dartmouth College with a Masters of Business Administration.

Butterworth is an Eagle Scout.

== Filmography ==
Title	Year	Producer	Director	Camera	Other	Notes
Seoul Train	2004	Yes	Yes	Yes	No	Alfred I. duPont – Columbia University Award — Silver Baton for excellence in broadcast journalism
Abduction: The Megumi Yokota Story	2006	No	No	No	Thanks	Alfred I. duPont — Silver Baton
War Don Don	2010	Executive	No	No	No	Nominated for two Emmy Awards
The Disappearance of McKinley Nolan	2010	Executive	No	No	No	
Donor Unknown	2010	Executive	No	No	No	Tribeca Online Festival Award and Silverdocs Audience Award
To Catch a Dollar: Muhammad Yunus Banks on America	2010	Executive	No	No	No	2010 Sundance Film Festival
Gone	2011	Executive	No	No	No	
Cape Spin: An American Power Struggle	2011	Executive	No	No	No	
Code of the West	2012	Executive	No	No	No	CINE Golden Eagle Award
The Revisionaries	2012	Executive	No	No	No	Alfred I. duPont — Silver Baton and Tribeca Film Festival Special Jury Award
Saving Face	2012	No	No	No	Funding	Academy Award, Best Documentary Short; Winner of two Emmy Awards including Best Documentary
Petey & Ginger	2012	Executive	No	No	No	
In Country	2014	Executive	No	No	No	
Silenced	2014	Executive	No	No	No	Nominated for an Emmy Award
The Mind of Mark DeFriest	2014	Executive	No	Yes	No	
Southwest of Salem: The Story of the San Antonio Four	2016	Executive	No	No	No	
United Skates	2018	Executive	No	No	No	
Call Her Ganda	2018	Executive	No	No	No	
The Feeling of Being Watched	2018	Executive	No	No	No	
The Infiltrators	2019	Executive	No	No	No	2019 Sundance Film Festival Audience Award
Always in Season	2019	Executive	No	No	No	2019 Sundance Film Festival Special Jury Award
Blessed Child	2019	Executive	No	No	No	
Red Heaven	2020	Executive	No	No	No	
The Jump	2020	Executive	No	No	No	
Pray Away	2021	Executive	No	No	No	
The Man of the Monkey	2021	Executive	No	No	No	
Delikado	2022	Executive	No	No	No	Nominated for Emmy Award
Loudmouth	2022	Executive	No	No	No	Nominated for Emmy Award
Night in West Texas	2025	Executive	No	No	No	
Who Killed Alex Odeh?	2026	Executive	No	No	No	2026 Sundance Film Festival Special Jury Award
