= List of films and television shows shot in Pennsylvania =

This list includes films and television shows about, or photographed (partially or completely) in Pennsylvania.

== Films ==
=== Adams County ===
- Gettysburg

=== Allegheny County (Pittsburgh) ===
- The Avengers
- A Visit to Santa
- Creepshow
- Day of the Dead
- The Dark Knight Rises
- Dear Zachary: A Letter to a Son About His Father
- The Deer Hunter
- Flashdance
- Happiest Season
- The Road
- Unstoppable
- Wonder Boys (2000)
- Zack and Miri Make A Porno

=== Armstrong County ===
- The Avengers

=== Berks County ===
- Rabbit, Run
- The Last Airbender

=== Blair County ===
- Unstoppable

=== Bedford County ===
- The Road

=== Bucks County ===
- Lady in the Water
- Signs
- The Last Airbender
- The Station Agent
- 'Til Death

=== Carbon County ===
- The Molly Maguires

=== Centre County ===
- Unstoppable
- The Thomas Crown Affair
- Hippo
- Shooting Heroin

=== Chester County ===
- The Benefactor
- The Blob
- The Lovely Bones
- Marley & Me
- The Village

=== Clearfield County ===
- Shooting Heroin

=== Dauphin County ===
- Another Harvest Moon
- Girl, Interrupted
- Lucky Numbers
- Major League II

=== Delaware County ===
- Clean and Sober
- Creed 2
- Last Call
- Silver Linings Playbook
- Taps
- The Lovely Bones

=== Erie County ===
- The Road

=== Fayette County ===
- Maria's Lovers
- The Silence of the Lambs
- Foxcatcher
- Sweet Girl

=== Greene County ===
- The Road

=== Lackawanna County ===
- Blue Valentine (film)
- Playing for Keeps
- That Championship Season
- The Trouble with Cali
- The Virtuoso (film)

=== Lancaster County ===
- Beloved
- Birch Interval
- For Richer or Poorer
- Girl, Interrupted
- My Name Is Khan
- Rock School
- The Boys from Brazil
- Witness

=== Lehigh County ===
- Bereavement
- Executive Suite
- Glass
- Hairspray
- Malevolence
- School Ties
- The Farmer Takes a Wife
- The Fields
- The Florentine
- Where Angels Go, Trouble Follows

=== Luzerne County ===
- All in Time
- The Miracle of the Bells

=== Mercer County ===
- Tiger Warsaw

=== Northampton County ===
- Brutal Massacre
- School Ties
- The Florentine
- The Sopranos (Season 4, Episode 9 titled "Whoever Did This"
- Transformers: Revenge of the Fallen

=== Wayne County ===
- Blue Valentine (film)
- Playing for Keeps
- Wet Hot American Summer

=== Westmoreland County ===
- Mars Attacks!
- My Girl
- Night of the Living Dead

=== York County ===
- Toad Road

=== Philadelphia and other locations throughout Pennsylvania ===
- Alexander Hamilton (1931)
- Sons of Liberty (1939)
- The Old Maid (1939)
- The Philadelphia Story (1940)
- Pride of the Marines (1945)
- Angels in the Outfield (1951)
- The Blob (1958)
- Night of the Living Dead (1968)
- The Crazies (also released as Codename: Trixie) (1973)
- Rocky (1976) - series
- Slap Shot (1977)
- Dawn of the Dead (1978)
- The Deer Hunter (1978)
- Martin (1978)
- Blow Out (1981)
- All the Right Moves (1983)
- Flashdance (1983)
- Trading Places (1983)
- Day of the Dead (1985)
- The In Crowd (1987)
- Mannequin (1987)
- Clean and Sober (1988)
- Hairspray (1988)
- Tiger Warsaw (1988)
- Downtown (1990)
- Lorenzo's Oil (1991)
- The Silence of the Lambs (1991)
- Bob Roberts (1992)
- Hoffa (1992)
- School Ties (1992)
- Waterland (1992)
- Groundhog Day (1993)
- Philadelphia (1993)
- Striking Distance (1993)
- Houseguest (1995)
- Sudden Death (1995)
- Twelve Monkeys (1995)
- Fallen (1996)
- Kingpin (1996)
- The Long Kiss Goodnight (1996)
- That Thing You Do! (1996)
- Inspector Gadget (1999)
- 8MM (1999)
- Dogma (1999)
- The Sixth Sense (1999)
- Stigmata (1999)
- Unbreakable (2000)
- A Wedding for Bella (2001)
- The Mothman Prophecies (2002)
- Signs (2002)
- Haggard: The Movie (2003)
- The Italian Job (2003)
- Jersey Girl (2004)
- National Treasure (2004)
- In Her Shoes (2005)
- Land of the Dead (2005)
- Invincible (2006)
- The Mysteries of Pittsburgh (2007)
- The Mighty Macs (2008) (a.k.a. "Our Lady of Victory")
- Smart People (2008)
- The Wrestler (2008)
- Zack and Miri Make a Porno (2008)
- Adventureland (2009)
- Law Abiding Citizen (2009)
- New York (2009)
- Minghags (2009)
- The Road (2009)
- Transformers: Revenge of the Fallen (2009)
- How Do You Know (2010)
- She's Out of My League (2010)
- Stake Land (2010)
- My Name Is Khan (2010)
- Unstoppable (2010)
- Abduction (2011)
- Jack Reacher (2012)
- Silver Linings Playbook (2012)
- The A.R.K. Report (2013)
- Split (2016)

== Television ==
=== Allentown ===
- 16 and Pregnant
- All Worked Up
- Forensic Files
- Kitchen Nightmares
- Medical Detectives
- Restaurant: Impossible
- The X-Files (Season 3 episode "Nisei" and Season 4 episode "Memento mori")
- The Simple Life

=== Philadelphia ===
- All My Children
- Alpha Girls
- Amen
- American Dreams
- American Exorcist
- Angie
- The Class
- Cold Case
- Cops (TV program) (select episodes)
- Fat Albert and the Cosby Kids
- The Goldbergs
- Hack
- How to Get Away with Murder
- It's Always Sunny in Philadelphia
- Little Bill
- One Life to Live
- Philly
- Postcards From Buster
- Pretty Little Liars
- Queer Eye (Season 5)
- The Real World: Philadelphia
- Smiling Friends
- Strong Medicine
- Thirtysomething

=== Pittsburgh ===
- American Rust
- The Chair
- Cops (TV program) (select episodes)
- Dance Moms
- Justified (pilot)
- Mr. Belvedere
- Sullivan & Son
- This Is Us

=== Hazleton ===
- Cops (TV program) (select episodes)
- Live PD (select episodes)

=== Wilkes Barre ===
- On Patrol: Live (select episodes)

== See also ==
- Harrisburg in film and television
- List of films shot in the Lehigh Valley
- List of films shot in Pittsburgh
- List of television shows shot in Pittsburgh
