= List of films shot in the Lehigh Valley =

A list of films shot wholly or partly in the Lehigh Valley region of eastern Pennsylvania:

== Allentown ==
List of films shot wholly or partly in Allentown, Pennsylvania:

- Achieving the Perfect 10 (2003)
- Bereavement (2010)
- Executive Suite (1954)
- Glass (2019)
- Malevolence (2004)
- Most Valuable Players (2010)
- The Farmer Takes a Wife (1935)
- The Fields (2011)
- Where Angels Go, Trouble Follows (1968)

== Bethlehem ==
List of films shot wholly or partly in Bethlehem, Pennsylvania:

- Brutal Massacre (2007)
- His Prehistoric Past (1914)
- Most Valuable Players (2010)
- School Ties (1992)
- The Florentine (1999)
- Transformers: Revenge of the Fallen (2009)

== Easton ==
List of films shot wholly or partly in Easton, Pennsylvania:

- Killian & the Comeback Kids (2020)
- The Florentine (1999)
