= Sean Tiedeman =

American film director

- Born: Frank Sean Tiedeman; November 17, 1972 (age 53); Phillipsburg, New Jersey, USA
- Occupations: Film director, producer, musician, and actor

Sean Tiedeman (born November 17, 1972) is an American film director, producer, musician, and actor.

== Biography ==
Tiedeman was raised in Phillipsburg, New Jersey and after finishing high school he graduated from Northampton Community College in Bethlehem, Pennsylvania. Tiedeman formed K Studios in 1997 with his college classmate, Scott Krycia. In May 2005, The Eastern Pennsylvania Business Journal named Tiedeman in the top 20 of the region's business leaders under the age of 40.

== Filmography ==
=== Director ===
- Flying Spiders (2021)
- The King of Arcades (2014)
- The Making of Bereavement (2010) - Anchor Bay Entertainment
- Eavesdrop: A Conversation with Writer/Director Matthew Miele (2010) - Osiris Entertainment
- The Making of Brutal Massacre: A Comedy (2008) - Anchor Bay Entertainment
- Hell's Half Acre (2006) - Blackplague Films
- The Stage (2003-2013) - A Telly Award-winning regional television program airing on Service Electric Cable TV and Blue Ridge Communications.
- Pop TV (2001-2003) - Service Electric Cable TV, Blue Ridge Communications
- The Best of Chiller Theatre (1998) - K Studios

=== Producer ===
- RoboDoc: The Creation of Robocop (2023) - Executive Producer/Dead Mouse Productions
- Romantic Mysticism: The Music of Billy Goldenberg (2022) - Associate Producer/Dreamfever Entertainment
- Sorority Babes in the Slimeball Bowl-O-Rama 2 (2022) - Associate Producer/Full Moon Features
- Killer: Malevolence 3 (2018) - Associate Producer
- Power of Grayskull: The Definitive History of He-Man and the Masters of the Universe (2017) - Associate Producer
- Passfire: Supercharged (2025) - Executive Producer/Veverka Bros. Productions
- Plank Face (2016) - Executive Producer/Bandit Motion Pictures
- You're So Cool Brewster! The Story of Fright Night (2016) - Associate Producer/Dead Mouse Productions
- Passfire (2016) - Associate Producer/Veverka Bros.
- Pennywise: The Story of 'IT' (2022) - Associate Producer/Dead Mouse Productions
- Back in Time (2015) - Associate Producer/Gravitas Ventures
- Leviathan: The Story of Hellraiser and Hellbound: Hellraiser II (2015) - Associate Producer/Cult Film Screenings
- The King of Arcades (2014) - Producer/Tiedebaby Films
- Trophy Heads (2014) - (2014) Executive Producer/Full Moon Features
- Thankskilling 3 (2012) - Executive Producer/Detention Films
- Making of Bereavement (2011) - Producer/Anchor Bay Entertainment
- Gingerdead Man 3: Saturday Night Cleaver (2011) - Executive Producer/Echo Bridge Home Entertainment
- Monsterpiece Theatre Volume 1 (2011) - Co-Executive Producer
- China: The Rebirth of an Empire (2010) - Associate Producer/Veverka Bros. Productions
- Eavesdrop (2008) - Associate Producer/Shoreline Entertainment/Osiris Entertainment
- Gingerdead Man 2: Passion of the Crust (2008) - 'Honorary' Executive Producer/Full Moon Features
- Hell's Half Acre (2006) - Producer/Blackplague Films
- Evil Bong (2006) - Associate Producer/Full Moon Features
- Everything's Jake (2000) - Associate Producer/Warner Bros.

=== Actor ===
- Brutal Massacre: A Comedy (2008) - Popcorn Clerk/Look Out Clown/Anchor Bay Entertainment
- Red Lips (1995) - Directed by Donald Farmer

=== Camera & Electrical Department ===
- Killer: Malevolence 3 (2018) - Grip & Electric Swing
- 30 Years of Garbage: The Garbage Pail Kids Story (2016) - Cinematographer
- Man vs Snake (2016) - Additional Footage Provided by
- Bereavement (2010) - Grip, Video, & Electric Swing
- 100 Scariest Movie Moments (2004) - Camera Operator: interview segments/Bravo (US TV channel)

=== Editor ===
- Sasqua: The Lost Bigfoot Film of Massachusetts (2024)
- The King of Arcades (2014)
- Hell's Half Acre (2006) - Blackplague Films
- The Badlees: Renew and Rewind (TV Movie) (2002)
- Iron City Asskickers (TV Pilot Directed by George A. Romero) (1998)

=== Miscellaneous Crew ===
- Romantic Mysticism: The Music of Billy Goldenberg (2022) - Titles/Graphics Manager
- In Search of Darkness (2019) - Blu-ray and DVD Authoring
- Killer: Malevolence 3 (2018) - Locations
- Bereavement (2010) - set dresser: second unit

=== Special Thanks ===
- Hardcore Henry (2015) - STX Entertainment
- Grace: Delivered (2009) - Anchor Bay Entertainment
- Evil Bong - Full Moon Features (2006)

== Feature Film Directing Career ==
=== Flying Spiders (2021) ===
When flying spiders wreak havoc on a small town, it's up to the locals to contain them before the airborne arachnids take over the world.

=== The King of Arcades (2014) ===
Follow the rise and fall of the King of Arcades as one man pursues his dream against all odds. The King of Arcades was one of the featured titles on the initial launch of GOG.com's DRM-free movie platform.

=== Hell's Half Acre (2006 film) ===
A serial killer is brought to justice by his victims and burned alive on what is now known as Hell's Half Acre. Years later, a faceless killer begins slaughtering the townspeople. Losing her friends and family, Nicole Becker (Tesia Nicoli) decides to go after the killer with all she's got. Double machetes, shotguns, dual handguns, and even a chain gun are all part of this killer's arsenal. Needless to say, it's gonna be messy.

== Music ==
Tiedeman writes, records, and performs novelty songs under the stage name of Irish Elvis. His song, 80's Arcade, has aired on several syndicated radio shows including Dr. Demento. 80's Arcade also received airplay on Manic Mondays hosted by Tom "Devo Spice" Rockwell of the comedy rap trio Sudden Death and became the #3 most requested new song of 2005 on Captain Wayne's Mad Music Hour. Tiedeman was also Executive Producer of Danny Weinkauf's children's album No School Today released by Megaforce Records/April 2014.
