= Scott Krycia =

American film director

- Born: Scott Matthew Krycia; March 24, 1971 (age 55); Bethlehem, Pennsylvania, US
- Occupations: Film director, film producer, photographer, and actor

Scott Krycia (born March 24, 1971) is an American film director, film producer, actor, and photographer.

== Biography ==
Krycia was raised in Bethlehem, Pennsylvania and after finishing high school he graduated from Northampton Community College in Bethlehem, Pennsylvania. Krycia formed K Studios in 1997 with his college classmate, Sean Tiedeman. In May 2005, The Eastern Pennsylvania Business Journal named Krycia in the top 20 of the region's business leaders under the age of 40.

== Photography ==
Scott Krycia, a curious photographer with a sense of wanderlust found his passion at just 10 years old. Following his father into a store, he was fascinated by the magic of photography. How a camera can capture a moment in time and tell and tell a lifetime of stories all at one time. Based in the Lehigh Valley region of Pennsylvania, Scott graduated cfrom ollege in 1995 and then worked with companies like Majestic, NorthFace, Martin Guitar, DeWalt, shooting still photography on film and TV sets, concert tours and more. Krycia's work has been featured on CNN, NatGeo Traveler and Discovery Networks.

== Filmography ==
=== Director ===
- Hell's Half Acre (2006) – Blackplague Films
- The Stage (2003–Current) – A Telly Award winning regional television program airing on Service Electric Cable TV and Blue Ridge Communications.

=== Producer ===
- The Ruse (2023) – Co-Producer/Mena Films
- Killer: Malevolence 3 (2018) – Co-Producer/Mena Films
- Eavesdrop (2008) – Associate Producer/Shoreline Entertainment
- Gingerdead Man 2: Passion of the Crust (2008) – 'Honorary' Executive Producer/Full Moon Features
- Hell's Half Acre (2006) – Producer/blackplague films
- Evil Bong (2006) – Associate Producer/Full Moon Features
- Everything's Jake (2000) – Associate Producer/Warner Bros.

=== Actor ===
- Brutal Massacre: A Comedy (2008) – Photographer/Anchor Bay Entertainment

=== Camera and Electrical Department ===
- All in Time (2015) – Still Photographer
- Alana (2010) – Still Photographer
- Sketched Out (2009) – Still Photographer
- Forged (2009) – Still Photographer
- N.A.M (2009) – Still Photographer
- Eavesdrop (2008) – Still Photographer/Shoreline Entertainment
- Malevolence: Bereavement (2009) – Still Photographer
- Brutal Massacre: A Comedy (2008) – Still Photographer/Anchor Bay Entertainment
- 100 Scariest Movie Moments (2004) – Camera Operator: interview segments/Bravo (US TV channel)

=== Production Services ===
- The Making of Brutal Massacre: A Comedy (2008) – Camera and Post-Production/Anchor Bay Entertainment
- Eavesdrop: A Conversation with Writer/Director Matthew Miele (2008) – Production Services

=== Special Thanks ===
- Grace: Delivered (2009) – Anchor Bay Entertainment
- Monsterpiece Theatre Volume 1 (2009)
- Brutal Massacre: A Comedy (2008)
- Evil Bong – Full Moon Features (2006)

== Feature Film Directing career ==
=== Hell's Half Acre (2006) ===
A serial killer is brought to justice by his victims and burned alive on what is now known as Hell's Half Acre. Years later, a faceless killer begins slaughtering the townspeople. Losing her friends and family, Nicole Becker (Tesia Nicoli) decides to go after the killer with all she's got. Double machetes, shotguns, dual handguns, and even a chain gun are all part of this killer's arsenal. Needless to say, it's gonna be messy.
