= Malevolence =

Malevolence or Malevolent may refer to:

== Concepts ==
- Evil
- Hostility
- Malice (law)
- Sadistic personality disorder, the experience of feeling pleasure from the pain of others

== Film and television ==
- Malevolence (film series), a series of three slasher films by Stevan Mena
  - Malevolence (film), the 2003 first film in the series
- Malevolent (2018 film), a British horror film by Olaf de Fleur
- To Your Last Death (working title Malevolent), a 2019 American animated horror film
- Malevolence, a ship in the TV series Star Wars: The Clone Wars

== Music ==
- Malevolence (band), an English metalcore band
- Malevolence (I Declare War album) or the title song, 2010
- Malevolence (New Years Day album) or the title song, 2015
- Malevolent Shrine (Jujutsu Kiasen), Japanese film series.

== Other uses ==
- Malevolence (plant), or Solanum atropurpureum, a perennial herbaceous plant
- Malevolence: The Sword of Ahkranox, a 2012 role-playing video game
