= Curt Apduhan =

American cinematographer

Curt Apduhan is a director of photography known for his work in feature documentaries. Apduhan's contributions to director Todd Robinson's documentary film Amargosa, a study of artist Marta Becket earned the cinematographer the NATAS 2003 News/Documentary Emmy for outstanding achievement in cinematography

Most Valuable Players, a feature documentary about a high school musical theatre competition named the Freddy Awards in the Lehigh Valley of Pennsylvania gained distribution on The Oprah Winfrey Network (OWN) for director Matthew Kallis and producer Christopher Lockhart

Apduhan also contributed filmed segments to the David Crosby television documentary “Stand And Be Counted” which aired on TLC.

Apduhan was the cinematographer for Go Tigers! a feature documentary about the Massillon Washington High School Tigers football program in Massillon, Ohio. The cinematographer was recognized for his work with a Sundance Film Festival nomination for best cinematography.

Apduhan made his directorial debut with his dramatic short film “Anniversary”, an Aesthetica Short Film Festival (ASFF) selection.

== Films ==
- Reboot directed by Joe Kawasaki
- Most Valuable Players directed by Matthew Kallis
- Go Tigers! directed by Kenneth Carlson
- “David Crosby’s Stand And Be Counted” directed by Todd Robinson
- Amargosa directed by Todd Robinson
- Under A Dead Sky directed by Nate Joseph
- The Situation directed by Will Scott
- Anniversary directed by Curt Apduhan
- Waiting For Goodbye directed by Curt Apduhan
- Tainted Blood: The Untold Story Of The 1984 Olympic Blood Doping Scandal directed by Jill Yesko
- The Last Dojo directed by William Christopher Ford
- The Volition Of Thalmus Doqui directed by Will Scott (in production)
- On The Margins” directed by Curt Apduhan (in production)
