= Pishacha =

Malevolent beings in Indian religions

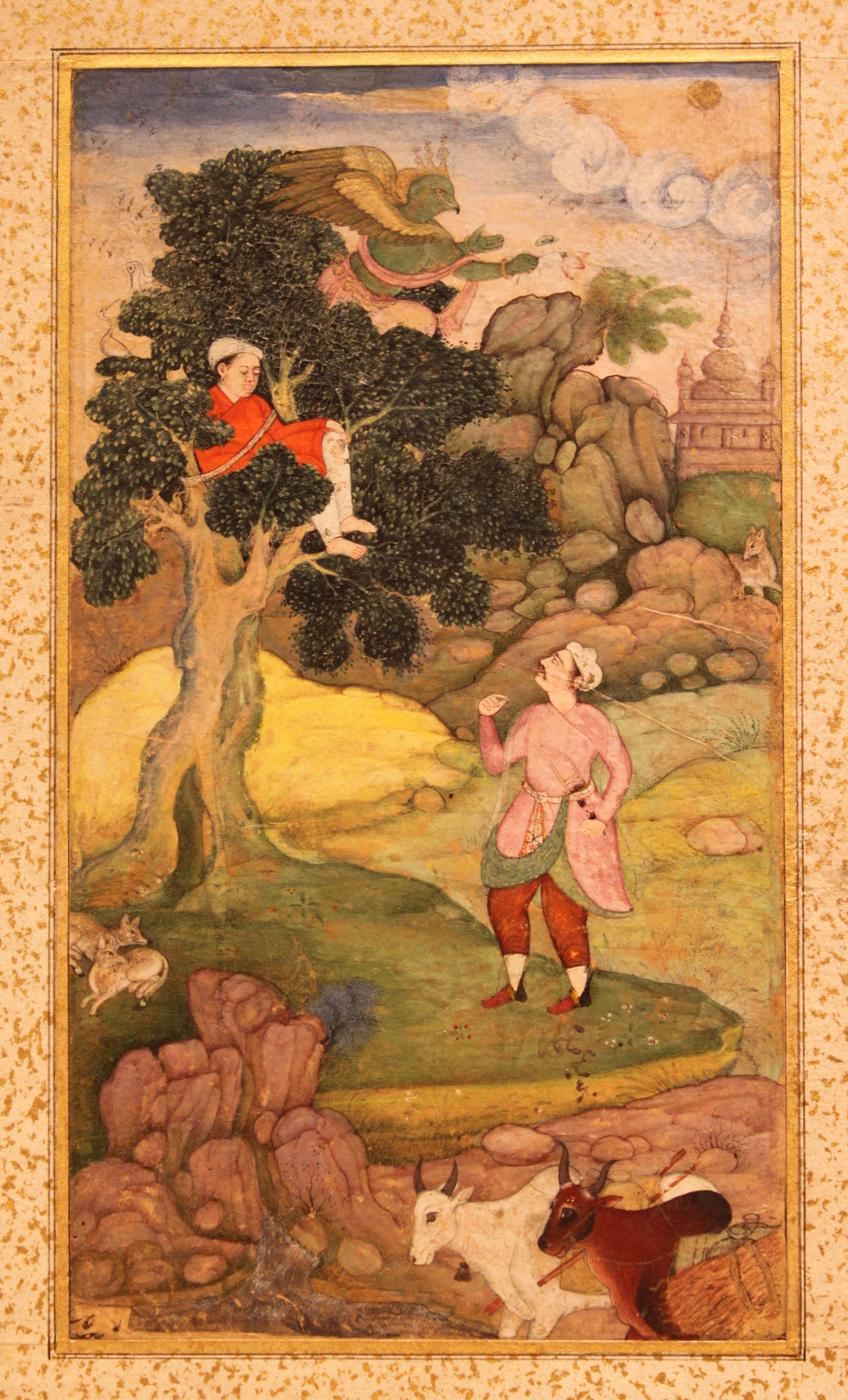
A later Sanskrit version of Brihatkatha, that is, Katha Saritsagara

Pishachas (Sanskrit: पिशाच, piśāca, IPA: [piɕaːt͡ɕɐ]) are flesh-eating demons or vampires from Indian religions, appearing in Hindu and Buddhist religions. Pishachas are malevolent beings who have often been referred to as the very manifestation of evil.

== Legend ==
The Mahabharata states that the original Pishachas were the creations of Brahma. The epic offers various interpretations of the beings, including their residence in the courts of Kubera or Brahma and their worship of Shiva and Parvati. The Pishachas are described as having fought on the side of Ghatotkacha against Karna. But they are also said to have served the Kauravas, acting as the horses of the chariot of Alambusha.

Other legends describe them as the sons of either Krodha (Personification of Anger) or as Dakṣa’s daughter Pishacha. They have been described as having bulging veins and protruding red eyes. They are believed to have their own languages, known as Paiśāci.

According to one legend, they are sons of Kashyapa and Krodhavasa (one of the daughters of Prajapati Daksha.) The Nilamata Purana of the 7th century says that the Kashmir valley was inhabited by two tribes: the Nagas and the Pishachas.

Pishachas like darkness and are traditionally depicted as haunting cremation grounds along with other beings like bhūtas and vetālas. Pishachas are said to possess the ability to shapeshift and assume any form at will, and can also become invisible. They also feed on human energy. Sometimes, they possess human beings and alter their thoughts, and the victims are afflicted with a variety of maladies and abnormalities like insanity. Certain mantras are supposed to cure such afflicted persons and drive away the Pishacha possessing that particular human being. In order to keep the Pishacha away, they are given their share of offerings during certain religious functions and festivals.

When burials are not performed properly, the deceased person may be unable to escape the dead body for indefined time, whereby turning into a Pishacha. It loses its ability to eat and drink, turns blind and suffers immensively. However, instinctively crave for the living, and sense their smell and presence, and may assault them. (Note: From Bănică, M. (2021). Glück, Gott und Gaben: Kultur und Religion der Roma. Aus dem Rumänischen übersetzt von Larisa Schippel (Vol. 44). Frank & Timme GmbH. Translation: (in English) "If the ritual of sacrifice is lacking or not fully performed, the soul of the dead person (jiva) remains a prisoner indefinitely, unable to enjoy release through death. It then turns into a pisaca - a being unable to eat or drink, deformed and blind, suffering terribly, but instinctively seeking out the living." Original: (in German) "Wenn nun das Ritual für das Opfer fehlte oder nicht vollständig durchgeführt worden sei, bleibt die Seele des Toten (jiva) auf unbestimmte Zeit Gefangene und ist nicht in der Lage, sich der Befreiung durch den Tod zu erfreuen. Dann verwandelt sie sich in eine pisaca - ein Wesen, das nicht imstande ist zu essen oder zu trinken, verformt sich und wird blind, leidet schrecklich, sucht aber instinktiv nach Lebenden.")

In ancient literature, the Dardic people in the north of Kashmir were referred to as "Pishacha" and Dardic languages were called Paiśāci. They are said to have been descendants of Prajāpati Kaśyapa.

The famous Brihatkatha which contain a vast collection of Indian legendary tales, written by writer Gunadhya in the 7th-century in Paisachi langiage.

== Thailand ==
In the Royal Institute Dictionary, the Thai term "ปิศาจ" (pisat), from Sanskrit, pishacha, is defined as "ghost" (ผี). Although not strictly Thai ghosts, the Pishacha appear in some stories in Thai folklore. They are among the spirits from the Hindu-Buddhist tradition in Thailand and are also represented in some Buddhist temple paintings.

== See also ==
- Yakshi, related class of beings in Indian religions
- Vetala, related class of beings in Indian mythology
- Kanjirottu Yakshi, vampiric figure in Indian folklore
- Pisaj (2004), Thai film about a pishacha
- Pisaasu (2014), Indian horror film based on pishachas
- Pishachini (2022), Indian TV series about a female pishacha
- It Lives Inside (2023), Indian-American horror film featuring a pishacha

== Sources ==
- Dictionary of Hindu Lore and Legend (ISBN 0-500-51088-1) by Anna Dhallapiccola
