= Love in Country =

2023 American war film

- Theatrical film poster
- Directed by: Kurt Braun; Richard Gayton
- Written by: Richard Gayton; James Sosontovich
- Produced by: Jerry McGrath
- Starring: David Tate Wilder; Michael Southworth; Vincent Van Hinte
- Cinematography: Rushikesh Bhadane; Kurt Braun
- Edited by: Robert Torrance
- Music by: Randy Miller
- Release dates: January 25, 2023 (Internet); February 14, 2023 (Blu-Ray)
- Running time: 122 mins.
- Country: United States
- Languages: English; French; Vietnamese

Love in Country is a 2023 American romantic war drama film, directed by Kurt Braun & Richard Gayton, the latter of whom co-wrote with James Sosontovich. The film stars David Tate Wilder, Michael Southworth, and Vincent Van Hinte. It premiered in 2023 on streaming services.

== Synopsis ==
In 1968 Vietnam, Army sergeants Ian Alexander and John Reese lead their squad through brutal combat missions. As they fight to keep their men alive, an unexpected romance blossoms between them amidst the chaos of war.

== Cast ==
- David Tate Wilder as Sgt. Ian Alexander
- Michael Southworth as Sgt. Johnny Reese
- Vincent Van Hinte as Capt. John 'Tower' Heinrick
- Jon Owens as PFC Charles 'Thumper' White
- Elijah Olachea as PFC Jay Edgar Burd
- Robert M O'Brien as SP4 Thomas 'Doc' Graham

== Reception ==
Marlon Wallace of WBOC-TV lamented about the lack of character development, but appreciated the representation: "Therefore, Ian and John are meant to represent those many men, but, without providing more intimate or personal details about the characters, it dehumanizes them into nothing more than game pieces or stick figures, generic plot devices with whom it's difficult to fully empathize or understand on any deeper level. Having this film though is very much appreciated on a representation level."

Ben Turner of The Pink Lens graded it 2/5 and derided the film for its shortcomings: "If you’re looking for a sweeping love story cast against the backdrop of visceral war, this is not that film. It has all the right components, but budget constraints and a lack of talent have left this just a box ticking exercise. Gay war movie? Tick."
