= Good Day for It =

- Directed by: Nick Stagliano
- Written by: Nick Stagliano; James C. Wolfe
- Produced by: Lou DiGiamo, Jr. Thomas R. Rondinella
- Starring: Robert Patrick; Hal Holbrook; Lance Henriksen; Mika Boorem; Samantha Mathis; Robert Englund; Joe Flanigan; Christian Kane; Richard Brake; Kathy Baker
- Cinematography: Stephen Kazmierski
- Edited by: Robert Larkin
- Music by: Matthew Ryan
- Distributed by: NAZZ Productions
- Release date: April 8, 2011
- Country: United States
- Language: English
- Budget: $2.5 million

Good Day for It is a 2011 independent drama film starring Robert Patrick, Samantha Mathis, Lance Henriksen, Kathy Baker, Robert Englund, and Hal Holbrook. It premiered at the Sonoma Film Festival on April 8, 2011.

== Plot ==
Unbeknownst to her mother, a girl is meeting in a roadside cafe with her estranged father who had to abandon the family about 15 years earlier. Her father was an assistant to a crime boss and robbed him to pay for the daughter’s medical treatment. Now, the boss and his thugs have been released from prison and coincidentally meet the girl and her father in the same cafe. They immediately recognize the father and want revenge.

== Cast ==
- Robert Patrick as Lucas "Luke" Cain
- Hal Holbrook as Hec
- Samantha Mathis as Sarah Bryant
- Mika Boorem as Emily
- Kathy Baker as Rose Carter
- Lance Henriksen as Lyle Tyrus
- Richard Brake as Norman Tyrus
- Robert Englund as Wayne Jackson
- Christian Kane as Dale Acton
- Joe Flanigan as Deputy Doug Brady
- Skye McCole Bartusiak as Rachel

== Production ==
Most of the filming took place at Memorytown, in Mount Pocono, Pennsylvania. There was also a scene filmed in Bangor, Pennsylvania. It had a budget of $2.5 million.
