= Harrisburg in film and television =

List of films and television series that have been filmed or set in and around Harrisburg, Pennsylvania, in the United States:

- 8 MM (feature film, 1999)
- Bob Roberts (feature film, 1992)
- Broadway Limited (feature film, 1941) - filmed at Harrisburg's train station
- The China Syndrome (feature film, 1979) - was not inspired by the Three Mile Island incident in 1979, but did help the public realize and fear what could have resulted from the incident
- The Colbert Report (TV series) - featured a segment on a repo man in Harrisburg; Colbert also commonly makes fun of and once featured Governor Ed Rendell on the show
- The Distinguished Gentleman (feature film, 1992)
- Frasier (TV series)- when Frasier is watching an episode of Antiques Roadshow, the announcer says, "Here's a shot of the city of Harrisburg"
- Girl, Interrupted (feature film 1999)
- Hollywood, Pa. (independent film, 1999) - filmed in Harrisburg and Lancaster
- The Light in the Forest (feature film, 1958)
- Lucky Numbers (feature film, 2000) - takes place in Harrisburg
- Made In U.S.A. (feature film, 1987) - Chris Penn, Lori Singer, Adrian Pasdar; filmed in Harrisburg and Lemoyne
- Major League II (feature film, 1994)
- Mannequin (feature film, 1987)
- National Lampoon's Animal House (feature film, 1978) - character Kent Dorfman is described as "a legacy from Harrisburg"; although the original film does not mention the location of the fictional city or college, DVD "extras" reveal that Faber is somewhere in Pennsylvania
- The Office (TV series) - in season 7, episode 4, Dwight says that he drops off day laborers in Harrisburg and tells them it is Canada (Sex Ed (The Office))
- The Remarkable Mr. Pennypacker (feature film, 1959) - set in Harrisburg and Philadelphia
- The Simpsons (TV series, 1997–1998) - Harrisburg was mentioned in episode 179 of season nine
- "U.S. Marshals" (feature film, 1998) - fugitive Mark Roberts (Wesley Snipes) is said to be in Harrisburg, PA
- Stolen Honor (documentary film, 2004) - anti-John Kerry film produced by Carlton Sherwood, a project of Red, White and Blue Productions based in Harrisburg
- Taking Lives (feature film, 2004) - partially filmed and set in Carlisle
- Thomas and the Magic Railroad (feature film, 2000) - filmed in Harrisburg and Strasburg
- The Vendors (short film, 2005) - filmed in Harrisburg, submitted to national and international film festivals

Films and television series filmed/set in nearby locations

- The Amish and Us (documentary film, 1998)
- Banshee (television series, 2013) - set in Pennsylvania Amish country, featured Harrisburg-based WHTM News
- The Coroner: I Speak for the Dead (television series, 2016- ) - features murder cases as solved by Dauphin County coroner Graham Hetrick
- For Richer or Poorer (feature film, 1997) - partially set in Intercourse, Lancaster County
- Gettysburg (feature film, 2001)
- Gods and Generals (feature film, 2003) - set in Gettysburg
- Grand (television series, 1990) - set in a fictional Pennsylvania town some exterior establishing shots were filmed in the Harrisburg area
- One Life to Live (soap opera, 1968–2012, 2013–2014) - opening credits (1984–1991) featured prominent views of the Harrisburg skyline
- Scotland, Pa. (feature film, 2001)
- Witness (feature film, 1985) - filmed in Intercourse, Lancaster County
- X-Men Origins: Wolverine (feature film, 2009) - final fight scene set at Three Mile Island Nuclear Generating Station, south of Harrisburg.
- Black Mirror Season 4 Episode 2 Arkangel features a 717 area code setting it in the greater Harrisburg area.

== See also ==
- List of Pennsylvania films and television shows
