= Craig Sechler =

American film and voice actor (born 1951)

- Born: September 8, 1951 (age 74)
- Occupations: Voice actor, actor

Craig Sechler (born September 8, 1951) is an American film and voice actor, based in Washington, D.C.

== Life and career ==
Sechler was born on September 8, 1951. Raised in Cranbury, New Jersey, he attended Hightstown High School. He grew up doing commercials and professional singing with his family which led him into his acting and voice acting career. Sechler is married to Julie Waterman, and has five children.

Sechler voices the characters Butch DeLoria, Sticky, Harkness, and others in Bethesda Softworks' game Fallout 3. He also appeared in The Elder Scrolls IV: Oblivion (and The Elder Scrolls IV: Oblivion Remastered) as the default voice of the elves (including the Adoring Fan, a role he reprises in Starfield). He voiced the game Star Trek: Legacy.

He also voiced The World Trade Center: Anatomy of the Collapse, the Nature series, the Incredible Human Machine, Decoding COVID-19, and the Nova episode "New Eye on the Universe".

== Credits ==
=== Film ===
- The Replacements (2000) as Reporter #3
- Mighty Aphrodite (1995) as Chorus Voice
- Home of Angels (1994) as Dad
- Once Around (1991) as Additional Voices
- A Shock to the System (1990) as Additional Dialogue
- The Wacky World of Mother Goose (1967) as Jack Horner

=== Television ===
- Legacy (1999), Episode: "A House Divided" as Benjamin
- The Big World of Little Adam (1964), as Little Adam's older brother Wilbur

=== Video games ===
- Starfield (2023) as Adoring Fan
- The Elder Scrolls V: Skyrim (2011) as male ghosts, Gallus Desidenius, Peryite and Hircine
- Fallout 3 (2008) as Butch and the MaleAdult04 voice type (including Harkness, Crazy Wolfgang, Sticky, Billy Creel, Talon Company mercenaries, Pronto, Sgt Benjamin Montgomery, Andy Stahl)
- Star Trek: Legacy (2006) as Captain Hollister, ENT crew, Klingon, Romulan
- The Elder Scrolls IV: Oblivion (2006) as Sheogorath (Pre-Shivering Isles), Barbas, and all High Elf (sans Mankar Camoran), Wood Elf, and Dark Elf Males (including High Chancellor Ocato, Mannimarco, and the Adoring Fan)
- Call of Cthulhu: Dark Corners of the Earth (2005) as Jack Walters/Madman/Evil Mutant
