= Hell's Half Acre (2006 film) =

- Promotional poster
- Directed by: Sean Tiedeman & Scott Krycia
- Produced by: [K] Studios
- Starring: Tesia Nicoli, Ken Schwarz, Todd Labar
- Distributed by: blackplague films
- Release date: 2006
- Running time: 60 minutes
- Country: United States
- Language: English

Hell's Half Acre is a low budget direct-to-video horror film directed by Sean Tiedeman and Scott Krycia. The film was shot over the course of five years in Allentown, Pennsylvania. Tiedeman and Krycia shot Hell's Half Acre on MiniDV for a modest budget. The duo planned everything from elaborate massacre sequences to the burning of an actual full-size house.

== Plot ==
A serial killer is brought to justice by his victims and burned alive on what is now known as Hell's Half Acre. Years later, a faceless killer begins slaughtering the townspeople. Losing her friends and family, Nicole Becker (Tesia Nicoli) decides to go after the killer with all she has got. Double machetes, shotguns, dual handguns, and even a chain gun are all part of this killer's arsenal.

== Cast ==
- Tesia Nicoli as Nicole Becker
- Ken Scwhwaz as Detective Lapetta
- Todd Labar as The Killer
- Jim Clauser as WDIE Radio Host
- Bob Weick as Bob Moore

== Release ==
Hell's Half Acre premiered theatrically on Saturday, October 27, 2007, at the Full Moon Film Festival in Little Rock, Arkansas. On Friday, March 13, 2009, Hell's Half Acre was shown as part of the Severed Sinema film series. The event was held at the Sherman Theater in Stroudsburg, Pennsylvania.
