= The Big World of Little Adam =

1960s television cartoons

The Big World of Little Adam was a series of television cartoons that debuted in syndication in 1964.

In the early 1960s, producer Fred Ladd acquired a large number of NASA documentary short subjects and packaged them as 110 five-minute episodes. Inexpensive animated wraparounds, featuring the inquisitive Little Adam and his older brother Wilbur, were added to open and close the segments.

The episodes were made available in syndication either as half-hour blocks or individually, often appearing interspersed within blocks of cartoons on local TV stations. The early 60s shorts became outdated after the Apollo 11 Moon landing in 1969, and the show fell out of syndication by the early 1970s.

Little Adam's voice was performed by John Megna; Wilbur was played by Craig Sechler.

== Partial list of episodes ==
- Aerospace Ship
- Aim for the Stars
- Aim for the Sun
- The Amazing Maser
- Blueprints from Space
- Breathing in Space
- The Dust Storm
- Echo in Space
- A Far-Away Cry
- The Flaming Re-entry
- Flying the Blizzard
- Gemini: The Space Twins
- The Highest Wind
- How Not to Fly to Venus
- Kitty Hawk to Mars
- Man in a Spacesuit
- Man on the Moon
- Mercury in Orbit
- Mercury Man in Space
- The Middle Ear
- Missing Spaceman
- OAO-Telescope in Space
- Our Wandering Planet
- Pictures from Space
- Recovery at Sea
- The Space Tug
- Star Glazers
- The World Tomorrow
- To Take the Moon
- Track of the Capsule
- Voice from Space
- Voices from the Moon
- War of the Satellites
- What Scares You
- Zero Gravity
- Zero Plus Five!
