= Kathryn Meisle (actress) =

American actress

- Meisle in 2026
- Born: Appleton, Wisconsin, U.S.
- Occupation: Actress
- Years active: 1988–present
- Spouse: Marcus Giamatti (m. 1990, divorced)

Kathryn Hunt Meisle is an American actress, known for her Broadway and off-Broadway performances. She received Tony Award for Best Featured Actress in a Play nomination for her performance in the 2003 production of Tartuffe. Her other notable Broadway credits include Racing Demon, London Assurance, The Constant Wife, The Elephant Man, The Glass Menagerie and Harry Potter and the Cursed Child.

Meisle also acted in both film and television, appearing in films such as Rosewood (1997), You've Got Mail (1998), Down (2001), Bereavement (2010) and The Greatest Showman (2017).

== Life and career ==
Meisle was born in Appleton, Wisconsin, a daughter of stage actor William Layton Meisle. She graduated from Smith College and received a master's degree in theater from the University of North Carolina at Chapel Hill. In 1990 she married to actor Marcus Giamatti, whey later divorced.

Meisle began her career appearing in the daytime soap operas. In 1988 she was cast as Cindy London on the ABC soap opera, One Life to Live and the following year played Juliet Crawford on another ABC soap, Loving. In 1990, she was featured on the CBS soap opera, Guiding Light and later that year made her primetime television debut appearing in an episode of Law & Order. Also in 1990, Meisle made her film debut starring in the horror comedy, Basket Case 2 directed by Frank Henenlotter. The following years she was featured in films That Night (1992), Rosewood (1997), and You've Got Mail (1998). On television, she guest-starred on Cosby, The Cosby Mysteries, Oz, Judging Amy, NYPD Blue, Brothers & Sisters, Damages, Grey's Anatomy, The Closer, Law & Order: Special Victims Unit, The Blacklist and The Chair Company.

Meisle made her Broadway debut starring in the 1995 play, Racing Demon. Prior, she starred in Delacorte Theater-production of As You Like It receiving Drama Desk Award for Outstanding Featured Actress in a Play nomination in 1993. The following years she appeared in more than ten Broadway productions, notable Tartuffe, receiving Tony Award for Best Featured Actress in a Play nomination.

== Filmography ==
=== Film ===
| Year | Title | Role | Notes |
|---|---|---|---|
| 1990 | Basket Case 2 | Marcie Elliott | |
| 1991 | Chicken Delight | Susan | Short film |
| 1992 | That Night | Mrs. Carpenter | |
| 1997 | Rosewood | Mary Wright | |
| 1998 | You've Got Mail | Cecilia Kelly | |
| 2001 | Down | Mildred | |
| 2010 | Bereavement | Karen Miller | |
| 2012 | Four | June's Mother | |
| 2017 | The Honey Bee | Christine Dickenson | Short film |
| 2017 | The Greatest Showman | Mrs. Hallett | |

=== Television ===
| Year | Title | Role | Notes |
|---|---|---|---|
| 1988 | One Life to Live | Cindy London | |
| 1989 | Loving | Juliet Crawford | |
| 1990 | Guiding Light | Eleanor | |
| 1990 | Law & Order | Catherine Moody | Episode: "By Hooker By Crook" |
| 1997-2001 | Oz | Mrs. Rockwell | 2 episodes |
| 1998 | Law & Order | Susan Young | Episode: "Under the Influence" |
| 1999 | Cosby | Helen | Episode: One For The Books |
| 2000 | Law & Order: Special Victims Unit | Gina Silver | Episode: "Disrobed" |
| 2000 | Sally Hemings: An American Scandal | Dolley Madison | Miniseries |
| 2002 | Judging Amy | Mrs. Guhler | Episode: "The Cook of the Money Pot" |
| 2004 | Without a Trace | Mrs. Manning | Episode: "Hawks and Handsaws" |
| 2004 | The Guardian | Saundra Castle | Episode: "The Vote" |
| 2004 | NYPD Blue | Janet Welker | 2 episodes |
| 2005 | CSI: Miami | Mrs. Seaborne | Episode: "Shootout" |
| 2007 | Brothers & Sisters | Alice Webb | Episode: "Three Parties" |
| 2007 | Damages | Mallory Fiske | 2 episodes |
| 2008 | New Amsterdam | Samantha | Episode: "Legacy" |
| 2008 | Grey's Anatomy | Liz Monroe | 2 episodes |
| 2009 | Lie To Me | Mary Cole | Episode: "Pilot" |
| 2009 | Bones | Helen Reilly | Episode: "The Double Death of the Dearly Departed" |
| 2009 | The Unusuals | Lisa Maint | Episode: "The Apology Line" |
| 2009 | The Closer | Jill Pappas | Episode: "Tapped Out" |
| 2010 | Private Practice | Sharon | Episode: "Can't Find My Way Home" |
| 2011 | Body of Proof | Helen Salerno | Episode: "Buried Secrets" |
| 2013 | Elementary | Therapist | Episode: "The Read Team" |
| 2015 | Law & Order: Special Victims Unit | Sharon Daley | Episode: "Depravity Standard" |
| 2017 | The Blacklist | Mrs. Kilgannon | Episode: "The Kilgannon Corporation (No. 48)" |
| 2025 | The Chair Company | Alice Quintana | 3 episodes |

=== Stage ===
| Year | Title | Role | Notes |
|---|---|---|---|
| 1974 | The Sleeping Beauty | Ensemble | Theater at Monmouth |
| 1975 | The Tempest | Miranda | Theater at Monmouth |
| 1975 | Androcles and the Lion | Ensemble | Theater at Monmouth |
| 1983 | As You Like It | Celia | PlayMakers Repertory Company |
| 1985 | Measure for Measure | Mistress Overdone | PlayMakers Repertory Company |
| 1985 | Curse of the Starving Class | Emma | PlayMakers Repertory Company |
| 1985 | Cyrano de Bergerac | Roxane | PlayMakers Repertory Company |
| 1986 | The Foreigner | Catherine Simms | Virginia Museum Theatre |
| 1991 | Othello | Desdemona | Shakespeare in the Park, Off-Broadway |
| 1992 | As You Like It | Celia | Shakespeare in the Park, Off-Broadway |
| 1994 | The School For Scandal | Lady Teazle | Shakespeare Theatre Company |
| 1995 | Racing Demon | Frances Parnell | Vivian Beaumont Theater, Broadway |
| 1996 | The Rehearsal | Hortensia | Criterion Center Stage Right, Broadway |
| 1997 | London Assurance | Grace Harkaway | Criterion Center Stage Right, Broadway |
| 2000 | Old Money | Florence DeRoot/Flinty McGee | Lincoln Center Theatre, Off-Broadway |
| 2002 | Humpty Dumpty | Nicole | McCarter Theatre |
| 2002 | Twelfth Night | Olivia | Shakespeare in the Park, Off-Broadway |
| 2003 | Tartuffe | Elmire | American Airlines Theatre, Broadway |
| 2003 | Three Sisters | Masha | The Guthrie Theatre |
| 2003 | Living Out | Nancy Robin | Second Stage Theater, Off-Broadway |
| 2005 | The Constant Wife | Marie-Louise | American Airlines Theatre, Broadway |
| 2005 | A Touch of the Poet | Deborah | Studio 54, Broadway |
| 2006 | The Real Thing | Annie | The Guthrie Theatre |
| 2007 | Mrs. Packard | Elizabeth Parsons Ware Packard | McCarter Theatre |
| 2008 | A Flea in Her Ear | Raymonde | Williamstown Theatre Festival |
| 2008 | Enchanted April | Rose Arnott | Arizona Theatre Company |
| 2009 | Women Beware Women | Livia | Red Bull Theatre, Off-Broadway |
| 2009 | Creditors | Tekla | La Jolla Playhouse |
| 2010 | Leaving | Irena | The Wilma Theater |
| 2011 | Death of a Salesman | The Woman | L.A. Theatre Works |
| 2011 | A Dram of Drummhicit | Felicity Oliphant | La Jolla Playhouse |
| 2011 | Much Ado About Nothing | Beatrice | Two River Theater Company |
| 2011 | Much Ado About Nothing | Beatrice | Shakespeare Theatre Company |
| 2012 | The Seagull | Irina Arkadina | Oregon Shakespeare Festival |
| 2012 | As You Like It | Jacques | Oregon Shakespeare Festival |
| 2013 | Clybourne Park | Bev/Kathy | The Guthrie Theatre |
| 2013 | Romeo and Juliet | Lady Capulet | Classic Stage Company, Off-Broadway |
| 2014 | Much Ado About Nothing | Ursula | Shakespeare in the Park, Off-Broadway |
| 2014 | The Elephant Man | Miss Sandwich/Princess Alexandra/Nurse | Booth Theatre, Broadway |
| 2015 | The Elephant Man | Miss Sandwich/Princess Alexandra/Nurse | Theatre Royal Haymarket |
| 2016 | Cymbeline | Cymbeline | Yale Repertory Theatre |
| 2016 | The May Queen | Gail | The Cape Playhouse |
| 2017 | The Glass Menagerie | Amanda Wingfield (Understudy) | Belasco Theatre, Broadway |
| 2018 | Harry Potter and the Cursed Child | Ensemble | Lyric Theatre, Broadway |
| 2025 | Richard II | Duchess of York | Astor Place Theatre, Off-Broadway |
| 2026 | Becky Shaw | Susan Slater (Understudy) | Helen Hayes Theater, Broadway |
| 2026 | Other Desert Cities | Polly Wyeth (Understudy)/Silda Grauman (Understudy) | Hudson Theatre, Broadway |
