= Nick Stagliano =

American film director

- Occupation(s): Film director, producer
- Website: www.nickstagliano.com

Nick Stagliano is a film director and producer. He has been president and producer/director of the Nazz Productions Inc., a New York-based producer and distributor of film and television entertainment contents.

== Director credits ==
- Home of Angels (1994)
- The Florentine (1999)
- Good Day for It (2011)
- The Virtuoso (2021)

== Producer ==
- The 24th Day (2004)
- The Florentine (1999)
