= K Studios =

Film producer

K Studios (usually spelled by the company as [K] Studios) is an entertainment multimedia production company founded in 1993 by filmmakers Sean Tiedeman & Scott Krycia. Located in Allentown, Pennsylvania, the company has produced a number of television shows, commercials, documentaries, corporate videos, websites, and feature films.

K Studios has completed projects for clients and companies as diverse as MTV Books, Bravo (US TV channel), March of Dimes, Service Electric Cable TV, Fangoria magazine, Geisinger Health System, Anchor Bay Entertainment, Majestic Athletic, The Badlees, and C.F. Martin & Company. In 2006, K Studios produced the direct-to-video feature film, Hell's Half Acre. Tiedeman and Krycia were also associate producers on the Warner Bros. film Everything's Jake starring Ernie Hudson, Evil Bong starring Tommy Chong, and Eavesdrop starring Ted McGinley and Chris Parnell. In May 2005, Tiedeman and Krycia were named to the Pennsylvania Eastern Business Journal's "20 Under 40" list of rising young stars.
