= Home of Angels =

1994 film by Nick Stagliano

- Directed by: Nick Stagliano
- Written by: James Oliva; Nicolas L. DePace
- Produced by: James Oliva
- Starring: Abe Vigoda; Sherman Hemsley; Joe Frazier; Lance Robinson; Aries Spears; Richie Rosati; Craig Sechler; Karin Wolfe
- Cinematography: David Max Steinberg
- Edited by: Thomas R. Rondinella
- Music by: George Small
- Release date: 1994
- Running time: 90 minutes
- Country: United States
- Language: English

Home of Angels is a 1994 feature film written by James Oliva and Nicolas L. DePace and directed by Nick Stagliano.

== Plot ==
Billy (Lance Robinson) defies his mother (Karin Wolfe) and father (Craig Sechler) and makes a secret trip from Long Island to Philadelphia to sneak his grandfather (Abe Vigoda) out of a nursing home and bring him home for the holidays. The convalescent home's inhabitants distract the staff so Billy and his confused Grandfather can make their escape. They cross path with a street gang whose leader (Aries Spears) commands a pursuit. They are given a hiding place by a concerned homeless man Buzzard Bracken (Sherman Hemsley), but their sanctuary is only temporary, as the gang invades the homeless camp and capture Billy and Gramps. Buzzard and his homeless friends rescue the two and raise money by panhandling in order to get them on their way back to Long Island and a Christmas reunion.

== Cast ==
- Abe Vigoda as Henry Bruggers
- Sherman Hemsley as Buzzard Bracken
- Karin Wolfe as Laura Bruggers
- Craig Sechler as Matthew Bruggers
- Joe Frazier as Thadeous
- Lance Robinson as Billy
- Carla Belver as Martha
- John Brumfield as Sammy
- Henry R Ford as Claude Cremson
- Alice Spivak as Josie
- Anne Murray as Jenny
- Michael Massee as Detective Baines
- Aries Spears as Gang leader
- Richie Rosati as Gang Member
- Bill Rowe as Fred
- Ray Xifo as Charlie the Cabbie
- Ron Crawford as Card Player

== Production ==
Home of Angels was produced by Cloverlay Productions, whose only movie produced so far is Home of Angels. Filmed on locations in Philadelphia, Pennsylvania in 1992, was Aries Spears first film when he was then 17.

== Distribution ==
Home of Angels was distributed on VHS by Bridgestone Multimedia.

== Critical response ==
Tv Guide: "With its falsely upbeat approach to Alzheimer's disease and homelessness, the sticky-sweet 'Home of Angels' plays like a PSA masquerading as timely drama. Although it merits consideration for delving into topics rarely addressed in children's movies, its good intentions are undone by its cutesy tone"
