= Malevolence (film series) =

American slasher film trilogy

- Official film series logo
- Based on: Characters by by Stevan Mena
- Country: United States
- Language: English
- Budget: $3,800,000 (3 films) (Note: Mena claimed in 2018, that there was no studio budget for the third movie, with the filmmaker completing the project on his own.)
- Box office: $391,084 (3 films)

The Malevolence film series consists of American slasher-horror crime films, written, directed, and produced by Stevan Mena. The series center around various groups of people who come into contact with a serial killer named Martin Bristol, who was kidnapped as a child and raised in an abusive upbringing by a murderer named Graham Sutter. The series explores the investigations surrounding his crime scenes, and attempts made by law enforcement to put an end to his murderous pattern.

Though the series as a whole lost money at the box offices, and were met with a mixed critical reception at the time of their release, the films have earned a more positive modern-day analyses while being deemed indie-cult classics of the horror genre. Contemporary reviews have favorably compared the first film to John Carpenter's Halloween, and the prequel to Friday the 13th; while Mena acknoweldged his fandom of the Carpenter's work. Ross Hughes of HorrorCultFilms.Co.UK praised the film series, stating: "...his is a franchise that is up there with the likes of Halloween. …a Slasher trilogy made by a slasher fan for the slasher fans…Unmissable."

== Films ==
Film	U.S. release date	Director	Screenwriter	Producer
Malevolence	September 10, 2004	Stevan Mena	Stevan Mena	Stevan Mena
Malevolence 2: Bereavement	March 4, 2011	Stevan Mena	Stevan Mena	Stevan Mena
Malevolence 3: Killer	October 12, 2018	Stevan Mena	Stevan Mena	Stevan Mena

=== Malevolence (2004) ===
Ten years following the abduction of six-year-old Martin Bristol from the swing set at his family's home by a madman, (Note: As later depicted in the prequel, Malevolence 2: Bereavement (2011)) the search for the child's location have proven unfruitful; ultimately believed to be a lost cause. This changes, when a group of robbers plan a bank heist in September 1999.

The team of thieves includes a desperate couple named Julian and Marilyn, her ex-convict brother Max, and his friend Kurt. The group gets separated during their escape and Kurt takes innocent bystanders, Samantha and her teenage daughter Courtney hostage in order to make it to the team's rendezvous location; a secluded rural farmhouse in the woods. Upon arrival the group begins to argue about the taking of these civilians, only to find that the home they have invaded belongs to a now-teenaged Martin. Forced to watch the murderous rampages of his abductor, and to clean up after him, Bristol has become a serial killer himself. As he begins to murder each of them, the robbers attempt to survive the night. Julian and Marilyn free the hostages, and work with them to try to escape before it's too late.

=== Malevolence 2: Bereavement (2011) ===
In 1989, a young boy named Martin Bristol suffers from congenital insensitivity to pain with anhidrosis (CIPA), a rare neural disorder in which the patient does not feel pain nor temperature senses. One day while playing on the swing at his family home, a deranged criminal named Graham Sutter kidnaps the child and forces him to watch as he abducts, murders, and mutilates young women. After Sutter slaughters the innocents, he orders Bristol to clean up the mess; a cycle that continues for years.

Five years later, a teenage orphan named Allison Miller comes to live with her uncle Jonathan, aunt Karen, and cousin Wendy in rural Minersville, Pennsylvania. As the family welcomes her to their home, Allison, a distance runner, goes on daily jogs and soon believes she sees a child in the window of the nearby Sutter Meat & Poultry factory, thought to be abandoned. When her uncle asks her to avoid the area due to rumored dangers in the area, she stubbornly rebels and seeks to find out more about its history. While investigating the building, she discovers the nightmares taking place therein and she too is attacked and bound by Sutter. Jonathan and Allison's boyfriend William frantically search for her; she escapes with Martin until they confront Sutter at her family's house.

=== Malevolence 3: Killer (2018) ===
After narrowly escaping local law enforcement, (Note: As depicted in the events of Malevolence (2004)) the killer known as Martin Bristol returns to his childhood home, from which he was abducted as a child. (Note: As depicted in the events of Malevolence 2: Bereavement (2010)) Tortured and raised as the accomplice of his captor, a serial killer named Graham Sutter, Bristol's psyche has been damaged beyond any sense of sanity. Upon returning to his family home, he is angered to find that it has been turned into a rental with various young women now residing as tenants. Ellie and her roommates quickly begin to realize that they are the targets of the murderer who has moved into the area, unaware of his identity and history.

With police officer Special Agent William Perkins on the trail of murders left behind, the Bristol family works together to find Martin and convince him to end his murderous rampage. As they draw closer they work frantically against time knowing that more innocents will die, while Ellie fights to survive the night.

== Main cast and characters ==
List indicators

This section includes characters who will appear or have appeared in the franchise in main roles.

- An empty grey cell indicates the character was not in the film, or that the character's official presence has not yet been confirmed.
- ^{A} indicates an appearance through archival footage or audio.
- ^{C} indicates a cameo role.
- ^{O} indicates an older version of the character.
- ^{U} indicates an uncredited appearance.
- ^{V} indicates a voice-only role.
- ^{Y} indicates a younger version of the character.

Character	Films		
Character	Malevolence	Maleveolence 2: Bereavement	Malevolence 3: Killer
Character	2004	2011	2018
Martin Bristol	Jay Cohen David K. Guida II^{Y}	Spencer List Chase Pechacek^{Y} Jay Cohen^{O}^{A}	Jay Cohen
Graham Sutter	David K. Guida	Brett Rickaby	Brett Rickaby
Samantha Harrison	Samantha Dark		Samantha Dark
Courtney Harrison	Courtney Bertolone	Courtney Bertolone^{C}^{A}	Courtney Bertolone
Julian	R. Brandon Johnson		R. Brandon Johnson^{A}
Sheriff Riley	John Ingram	John Ingram^{C}^{U}	John Ingram
SA William Perkins	Kevin McKelvey		Kevin McKelvey
Marilyn / Mary	Heather Magee		
Kurt	Richard Glover		
Max	Keith Chambers		
Allison Miller		Alexandra Daddario	
Ellie		Katie Gibson^{V}	Katie Gibson
Katherine Bristol		Ashley Wolfe	Ashley Wolfe
Georgianna Pritchett		Lynn Mastio Rice	Lynn Mastio Rice
Jonathan Miller		Michael Biehn	
Wendy Miller		Peyton List	
Karen Miller		Kathryn Meisle	
William		Nolan Gerard Funk	
Meredith Bristol			Adrienne Barbeau
Tara			Kelsey Deanne
Lynn			Alli Caudle

== Additional crew and production details ==
Film	Crew/Detail					
Film	Composer	Cinematographer	Editor(s)	Production companies	Distributing companies	Running time
Malevolence	Stevan Mena	Tsuyoshi Kimoto	Stevan Mena & Eddie Akmal	Mena Films Inc., Painted Zebra Releasing Films, The Solari Group, Anchor Bay Entertainment, Magnetic Media Productions, Caffeine Entertainment, Compression Films	Mena Films Inc., MVD Distribution, Anchor Bay Entertainment	1 hr 30 mins
Malevolence 2: Bereavement	Stevan Mena	Marco Cappeta	Steven Mena	Mena Films Inc., Crimson Films, Aurilia Arts Productions	Mena Films Inc., Anchor Bay Entertainment	1 hr 43 mins
Malevolence 3: Killer	Stevan Mena	Stevan Mena	Stevan Mena	Mena Films Inc., Magnetic Media Productions	Mena Films Inc., MVD Distribution	1 hr 29 mins

== Reception ==
=== Box office and financial performance ===
Film	Box office gross			Box office ranking		Video sales gross	Worldwide total gross income	Budget	Worldwide total net income	Ref.
Film	North America	Other territories	Worldwide	All time North America	All time worldwide	North America	Worldwide total gross income	Budget	Worldwide total net income	Ref.
Malevolence	$127,287	$220,085	$347,372	#12,140	#14,586	Information not publicly available	>$347,372	$200,000	≥$147,372	
Malevolence 2: Bereavement	$43,712	—N/a	$43,712	#14,935	#28,357	Information not publicly available	>$43,712	$3,600,000	≥−$3,556,288	
Malevolence 3: Killer	—N/a	—N/a	—N/a	—N/a	—N/a	Information not publicly available	Information not publicly available	$0	Information not publicly available	
Totals	$170,999	$220,085	$391,084	x̄ #9,025	x̄ #14,314	>$0	>$391,084	$3,800,000	≥−$3,408,916	—N/a

=== Critical and public response ===
Film	Rotten Tomatoes	Metacritic
Malevolence	35% (17 reviews)	43/100 (8 reviews)
Malevolence 2: Bereavement	44% (18 reviews)	TBD (3 reviews)
Malevolence 3: Killer	TBD (0 reviews)	—N/a
