= Karin Wolfe =

American actress (born 1944)

- Born: April 6, 1944 (age 80); Dallas, Texas

Karin Wolfe (born April 6, 1944, in Dallas, Texas) is an American actress. She is probably best known for her role of Mary Anderson on the soap opera Days of Our Lives.

Wolfe played the title role in the original Broadway production of the musical Gigi in 1973 and 1974 and acted in Bye Bye Birdie (1960). Her Off-Broadway productions included Best Foot Forward (1963), Jo (1964), and Autumn's Here (1966).

Wolfe's mother was a chorus girl who became a dance teacher.

In 1966, Wolfe portrayed Rosemary in a production of How to Succeed in Business Without Really Trying at the Municipal Opera in St. Louis.

== Filmography ==
=== Film ===
- Home of Angels (1994) as Mom.
- Doctors' Wives (1971) as Pretty Nurse.
- Williamsburg: the Story of a Patriot (1957) as Caroline Fry.

=== Television ===
- Another World as Pam Sloan.
- Days of Our Lives as Mary Anderson.
- Dan August, Episode: "The Meal Ticket" as Tina Abroms.
- The Courtship of Eddie's Father, Episodes: "Mrs. Livingston, I Presume" and "Who Pulled the Blues Right Out of the Horn" as Etta.
- Here Come the Brides, Episode: "A Crying Need" as Millicent.
- The United States Steel Hour, Episode: "The Adventures of Huckleberry Finn" as Joanna.
- The Phil Silvers Show, Episode: "Bilko the Genius" as Blanche.
- The Best of Broadway, Episode: "Panama Hattie" as Gerry.
