= Richie Rosati =

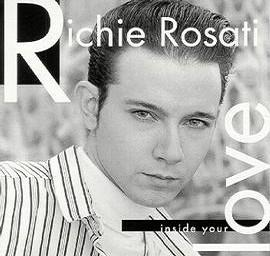
- Born: Philadelphia, Pennsylvania, U.S.
- Occupations: Recording artist, television host, actor
- Years active: 1989–present

Richie Rosati is an American recording artist, songwriter, ASCAP music publisher, television host, and actor. His songs air on radio stations in the United States and overseas.

== Life and career ==
Rosati was born and raised in Philadelphia, Pennsylvania. He grew up in a musical, Roman Catholic, Italian, family and attended the Girard Academic Music Program High School in Philadelphia (GAMP). After graduating from GAMP, he attended college at Philadelphia University. He left Philadelphia to live and work in Hollywood, California, where he was offered talent representation with the David Wilder Agency.

While promoting his music career in Hollywood, he met and began working with his first record producer, George Reich, while hanging out pushing song demos on dance club DJs at various Hollywood night spots. George Reich is credited with discovering Rosati musically in Hollywood. The two began working out of Reich's recording studio on a song demo for Rosati's first radio played pop single titled "Fast & Nasty Girl".

Both Reich and Rosati began shopping the completed song demo to Los Angeles and New York City record labels. Hollywood DJ's started playing the song demo in dance clubs. The demo caught the attention of DJ Vinny Lombardi back in Rosati's hometown Philadelphia. Lombardi was a radio DJ for WPWT 91.7 FM Dance Radio and the first radio station DJ to spin Rosati's music on commercial radio airwaves.

When Rosati's talent agency relocated their offices to New York City, Rosati headed back east with the agency. While promoting out of New York, he met and started working with another record producer named Robert Federici. Federici asked Rosati to reconstruct the song more commercially so that commercial radio stations could air the song.

With the help of Program Director Glenn Kalina and Music Director Pam Grund at WIOQ FM RADIO, the commercial version of Fast & Nasty Girl made it onto the airwaves of Philadelphia’s most popular dance radio station WIOQ. Rosati began doing promotional club performances for the station to promote the song.

From the airplay Rosati received on that station, and with the help of Woody Dyer and Nate DeLegall, Rosati landed a distribution deal with Universal Records Distribution. As Rosati's first single continued to be played on Q102 FM, other radio stations began airing the song, putting Rosati into the mainstream spotlight.

It was during this time that Rosati landed a part in the film titled "Home Of Angels" opposite Sherman Hemsley and Abe Vigoda.

Rosati then recorded the single "Metropolis", which caught the attention of Henry Stone and Paul Klein who owned the internationally distributed dance record label HOT Records, based in Miami, Florida. The executives at HOT Records paired Rosati with another producer, Bobby LaSerra, who owned and operated the HOT Records sub label Strong Island Records. LaSerra, Rosati, and the executives at HOT Records released several remixes of the single "Metropolis" worldwide.

Rosati then went on to record numerous other dance singles and embarked on releasing two Philadelphia sports team songs. "Fightin' Phils", a tribute to the Philadelphia Phillies which aired on radio during their World Series win and featured on Fox TV and Philly.com. His second sports song for the Philadelphia Flyers titled "Broad Street Bullies" generated over 40,000 hits on YouTube in one week and also gained radio station airplay.

Rosati is currently working as a national television host and continues to record pop music which is aired on commercial radio stations both in the United States and overseas.

== Richie Rosati published discography ==
- "Fast & Nasty Girl" (1992)
- "When Mama Ain't Watchin" (1993)
- "Inside Your Love" (Original radio version 1994)
- "Metropolis" (Original radio version 1995)
- "Take Me" (2008)
- "Fightin' Phils, We're Here to Stay" (2008)
- "Get Down with My Love" (2009)
- "Broad Street Bullies" (2010)
- "Nothing To Hide" (2010)
- "Hollywood (Radio Version)" (2011)
- "Hollywood (Sunset Strip Remix)" (2011)
- "Inside Your Love" (Remixed/Remastered for US and UK Radio 2011)
- "Metropolis" (Remixed/Remastered for US and UK Radio 2011)
- "Stay" (2011)
