= The King of Arcades =

- Film poster
- Directed by: Sean Tiedeman
- Produced by: Krystle-Dawn Willing, Eric Tessler, and Adam F. Goldberg
- Starring: Walter Day; Billy Mitchell; Richie Knucklez; Eugene Jarvis; Ralph H. Baer; Jerry Buckner
- Cinematography: Sean Tiedeman
- Distributed by: GOG.com
- Release date: June 17, 2014 (United States)
- Running time: 100 minutes
- Country: United States
- Language: English
- Budget: $175,000

The King of Arcades is a 2014 American documentary film starring Walter Day, Billy Mitchell, Richie Knucklez, Steve Wiebe, and Eugene Jarvis. The film follows the rise and fall of the King of Arcades as one man pursues his dream against all odds.

== Synopsis ==
The King of Arcades details the life and times of punk rock musician and classic arcade collector Richie Knucklez, on his journey to cultural prominence when he takes his passion for collecting to new heights by opening an arcade business in Flemington, New Jersey, only to watch it fall in the wake of economic hardship.

== Production ==
The film's budget was funded through a successful Kickstarter campaign, raising a grand total $47,684.00

The King of Arcades was co-produced by Fanboys writer and The Goldbergs creator Adam F. Goldberg. The film features Richie Knucklez and his band Knuckle Sandwich's punk rock re-recording of the hit '80s song "Pac-Man Fever", by Buckner & Garcia. The new version features vocals by Danny Jones. Jones' voice can be heard on the theme song "Wreck It, Wreck-It Ralph" from Disney's animated film "Wreck-It Ralph."

== Release ==
The King of Arcades was released through GOG.com's DRM-free movie section.

The King of Arcades premiered theatrically September 13, 2014 at Sands Casino Resort Bethlehem, Frank Banko Alehouse in Pennsylvania.

In 2018, The King of Arcades became available on Amazon Prime Video and in 2023 the film premiered on Tubi and Apple TV.

== Reception ==
Twin Galaxies stated that “Knucklez’ poignant journey from collector to operator to cultural scene phenomena is moving and at times heartbreakingly familiar to anyone who has ever dared do anything risky in business.”

=== Top five lists ===
The King of Arcades appeared on several critics' top five lists of the best video game documentary films:

- 3rd - Retro Asylum "(Richie Knucklez) is such a likeable character and there is so much fascinating stuff in this to enjoy."
- ThatMomentIn.com "Knuckles brings a charismatic charm to the film as we see him rescuing and restoring old arcade cabinets."
- DanCounsell.com "There's not much of a 'rise and fall' story here. Anyway, it's still a great documentary."
