= Go Tigers! =

2001 documentary film by Kenneth A. Carlson

- DVD cover
- Directed by: Kenneth A. Carlson
- Written by: Kenneth A. Carlson
- Produced by: Kenneth A. Carlson; Sidney Sherman
- Starring: Dave Irwin; Ellery Moore; Joe Paterno; Danny Studer
- Music by: Randy Miller
- Distributed by: IFC Films
- Release date: September 21, 2001
- Running time: 103 minutes
- Country: United States
- Language: English

Go Tigers! is a 2001 documentary film about the Washington High School Tigers of Massillon, Ohio, and its rivalry against the Canton McKinley High School Bulldogs of the same city. Written and directed by Kenneth A. Carlson, the film follows the team during the 1999 regular season. It features the players (mainly the co-captains), and follows them around the whole school year and tells all their stories.
