= The Virtuoso (film) =

2021 film by Nick Stagliano

- Theatrical release poster
- Directed by: Nick Stagliano
- Written by: James C. Wolf
- Produced by: Nick Stagliano
- Starring: Anson Mount; Abbie Cornish; Anthony Hopkins
- Cinematography: Frank Prinzi
- Edited by: James LeSage
- Music by: Brooke Blair; Will Blair
- Production companies: Nazz Productions; 120dB Films; Double Dutch International
- Distributed by: Lionsgate Films
- Release date: April 30, 2021
- Running time: 110 minutes
- Country: United States
- Language: English

The Virtuoso is a 2021 American neo-noir crime thriller film directed and produced by Nick Stagliano. The film stars Anson Mount, Abbie Cornish, Eddie Marsan, Richard Brake, David Morse, and Anthony Hopkins. It follows a professional assassin who must track down and kill his latest target to satisfy an outstanding debt to his mentor.

== Summary ==
An assassin is given a strange assignment by his mentor wherein he must kill a hitman. Knowing only the time and location but not the identity of the hitman, he must identify who is the target before they disappear.

== Cast ==
- Anson Mount as The Virtuoso
- Abbie Cornish as The Waitress
- Anthony Hopkins as The Mentor
- Eddie Marsan as The Loner
- David Morse as The Deputy
- Richard Brake as Handsome Johnnie
- Diora Baird as Johnnie's Girl
- Chris Perfetti as The Motel Clerk
- Ryan Jonze as The GTO Guy
- Shay Guthrie as The GTO Girl

== Production ==
Filming occurred in January 2019 in Santa Ynez, California. Filming also occurred in Scranton, Pennsylvania in late March and early April 2019.

== Release ==
In March 2021, Lionsgate Films acquired the North American and U.K. distribution rights to the film, which was simultaneously released in theaters and on VOD and digital on April 30, 2021.

It was released on DVD and Blu-ray on May 4, 2021, by Lionsgate Home Entertainment.

== Reception ==
On review aggregator Rotten Tomatoes, the film holds an approval rating of 18%, based on 55 reviews, with an average rating of 4.1/10. The website's consensus reads, "Don't let the title -- or the talented cast -- fool you: The Virtuoso falls far shy of even base level competency in its attempts to wring fresh excitement from a threadbare assassin thriller setup." On Metacritic, the film has a weighted average score of 24 out of 100, based on 7 critics, indicating "generally unfavorable reviews".

Leslie Felperin of The Guardian gave the film 2 out of 5 stars and wrote:

"When it’s all over and the big twist you saw coming in the first 15 minutes has been revealed, you feel empty, a bit depressed, and like you need another cup of coffee."
