= Randy Miller (composer) =

American composer

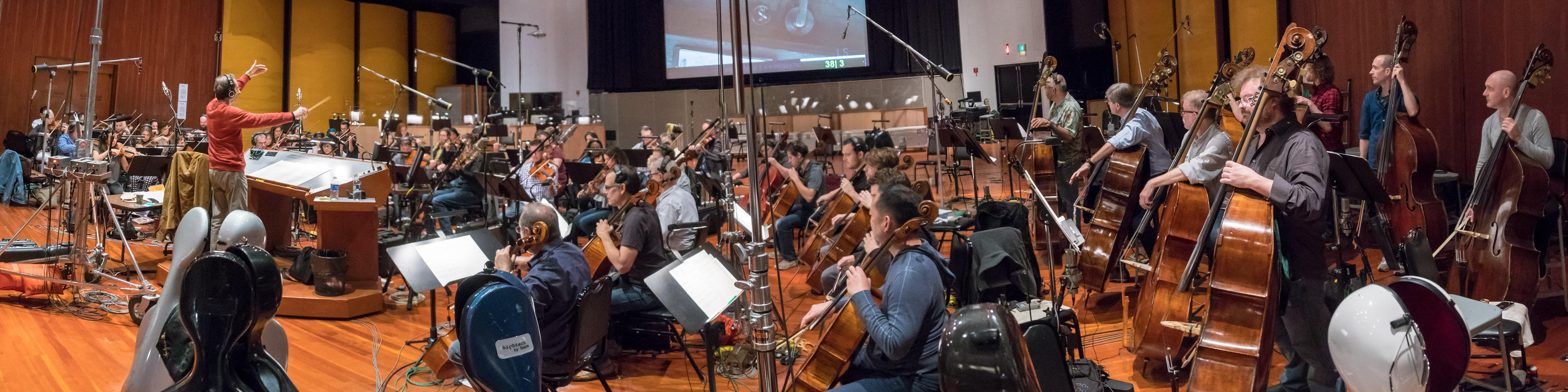

Background information
- Genres: Film score
- Occupations: Composer, conductor, arranger
- Website: www.randymiller.com

Randy Miller is an American film and television score composer, conductor, and arranger.

== Early life ==
Miller was raised in New York State and South Florida. He is the son of vocalist and entertainer Muriel King.

== Career ==
=== Composing credits ===
Miller's early career composing credits include: M.A.N.T.I.S. (TV series), The Outer Limits (1995 TV series), Hellraiser III: Hell on Earth (film, Anthony Hickox), Dreamrider (film, James Earl Jones), Darkman II: The Return of Durant (film, Sam Raimi), And You Thought Your Parents Were Weird (film), Heaven & Earth (film, Oliver Stone, additional music), The Soong Sisters (film, Vivian Wu), and Without Limits (film, Robert Towne, Tom Cruise).

The Heart of Nuba, Spartacus (USA Network mini series), Amargosa (Oscar documentary finalist), The Freedom to Marry, Handy Manny (Disney TV series), 2002 Firestarter 2: Rekindled, Yellow Rock Jack and the Beanstalk, Shanghai Red, Prancer Returns Go Tigers!, Most Valuable Players, and Extinction Soup.

=== Other work ===
Miller has done extensive work for other film composers including: Cliff Martinez, BT, Marcelo Zarvos, David Newman and Robert Folk as an additional composer, arranger, conductor and orchestrator on films such as: Game Night, The Fast and the Furious, Contagion, What's My Name: Muhammad Ali, Breakthrough, The Best of Enemies, Stealth, Rememory, Zoolander, Summer Wars, The Flintstones, The Sandlot, Tremors, Hoffa, Tommy Boy, Police Academy 6: City Under Siege, The Company You Keep, Coneheads, I Love Trouble, Driven, Bill & Ted's Bogus Journey, and Miles from Home.

His work for recording artists, Michael Franti and Spearhead, Kitaro, Nathan Pacheco, Sir Anthony Hopkins and BT includes string arrangements, orchestrations and conducting assignments.

Miller has composed industrial music for Walt Disney Imagineering.

=== Multimedia ===
In addition to working in the recorded medium, Miller has composed music for live multimedia immersive events such as: The Marvel Experience and Impressions of the West Lake (directed by Zhang Yimou).

=== Academia ===
Miller is currently on the faculty at Emerson College in Los Angeles.

== Scores as composer ==
- 1988 The Boy from Hell (film)
- 1988 Doctor Hackenstein (film)
- 1988 Witchcraft (film)
- 1988 Witchery (film)
- 1988 High Mountain Rangers (TV, additional music)
- 1989 Jesse Hawks (TV, additional music)
- 1989 Police Academy 6: City Under Siege (film, additional music)
- 1990 The Willies (film)
- 1990 Tremors (film, additional music)
- 1991 Toy Soldiers (film, additional music)
- 1991 Rock-A-Doodle (film, additional music)
- 1991 Black Magic Woman (film)
- 1991 And You Thought Your Parents Were Weird (film)
- 1991 Into the Sun (film)
- 1992 Hellraiser III: Hell on Earth (film)
- 1992 Santa's First Christmas (TV movie)
- 1993 A Case for Murder (TV movie)
- 1993 Dreamrider (film)
- 1994 Encounters: The Hidden Truth (TV series)
- 1994 M.A.N.T.I.S. (TV series)
- 1994 The Ghen War (video game, live action music)
- 1995 Tommy Boy (additional music)
- 1995 Darkman II: The Return of Durant (video)
- 1996 Darkman III: Die Darkman Die (film)
- 1996 The Outer Limits (TV series)
- 1996 Space Marines (film)
- 1996 The Right to Remain Silent (TV movie)
- 1997 Living in Peril (film)
- 1997 The Soong Sisters (film)
- 1997 Byzantine: The Betrayal (video game)
- 1998 Ground Control (film)
- 1998 Without Limits (film)
- 1998 Picture of Priority (film)
- 1999 Family Tree (film)
- 1999 Pirates of the Plain (film)
- 2000 Amargosa (documentary)
- 2000 Time of Her Time (film)
- 2001 Go Tigers! (documentary)
- 2001 Hitched (TV movie)
- 2001 Prancer Returns (film)
- 2002 Firestarter 2: Rekindled (TV mini-series)
- 2002 Astronauts (TV movie)
- 2003 Little Alvin and the Mini-Munks (film)
- 2004 Spartacus
- 2004 Vendetta: No Conscience, No Mercy (film)
- 2006 Last Time Forever (film)
- 2006 First Snow (additional music)
- 2006 Shanghai Red (film)
- 2007 Second Chance Season (documentary)
- 2008 Uncross the Stars (film)
- 2009 Summer Wars (film, additional music)
- 2009 Jack and the Beanstalk (film)
- 2010 Handy Manny's School for Tools (TV series)
- 2010 Most Valuable Players (documentary)
- 2011 Yellow Rock (film)
- 2012 Life's an Itch (film)
- 2012 Handy Manny (TV series)
- 2014 Extinction Soup (documentary)
- 2014 The Marvel Experience
- 2016 The Freedom to Marry (documentary)
- 2016 The Heart of Nuba (documentary)
- 2016 Sisters of the Groom (TV movie)
- 2016 Hometown Hero (TV movie)
- 2017 The Joneses Unplugged (TV movie)
- 2017 A Man for Every Month (TV movie)
- 2017 Happily Never After (TV movie)
- 2018 Brimming with Love (TV movie)
- 2018 Choices: I Won't Let Go (film)

== Awards ==
- 1997 The Soong Sisters, Golden Horse Award – Best Original Film Score
- 1998 The Soong Sisters, Hong Kong Film Award – Best Original Film Score
- 2001 Prancer Returns, Video Premiere Award – Best Original Score
