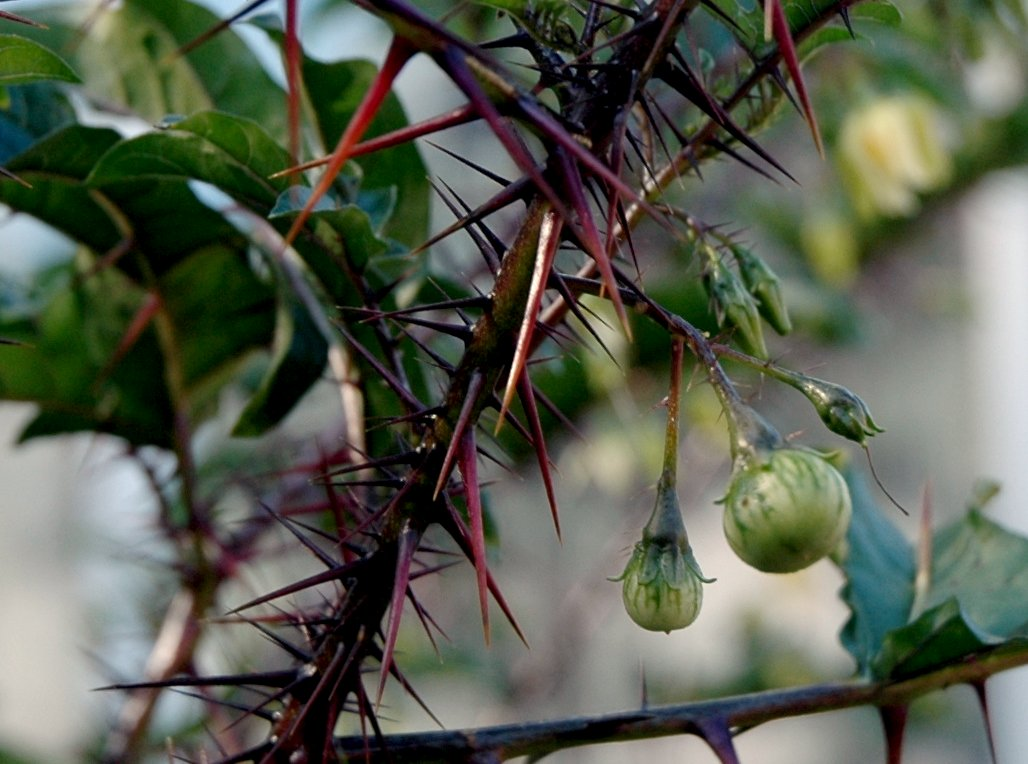

Scientific classification
- Kingdom: Plantae
- Clade: Tracheophytes
- Clade: Angiosperms
- Clade: Eudicots
- Clade: Asterids
- Order: Solanales
- Family: Solanaceae
- Genus: Solanum
- Species: S. atropurpureum

Binomial name
- Solanum atropurpureum L.

= Solanum atropurpureum =

Species of flowering plant

Solanum atropurpureum, commonly known as malevolence, purple devil and the five-minute plant, is a toxic species of herbaceous plant native to Brazil.

== Description ==
The perennial plant is a shrub growing 1.2 to 1.8 metres (4 to 6 ft) in height and 90 to 120 centimetres (35 to 47 in) in width. The leaves are ovate, spade shaped and 5 to 10 cm (2 to 4 in) long when fully grown. The plant is characterized by its purple stems, which are completely covered by striking purple and green thorns ('prickles') about 2 cm long, from which its common names are ostensibly derived.

From late spring to mid-summer bloom yellow to white flowers. The fruit is 1–2 cm wide and orange when ripe. The fruit's juices can be irritating to the touch, so it is recommended that gloves be used when removing or handling. The plant is short lived with a 3 to 5-year lifespan.

The prickles are not present on the species' edible eggplant cousin, due to differences in the LOG gene.

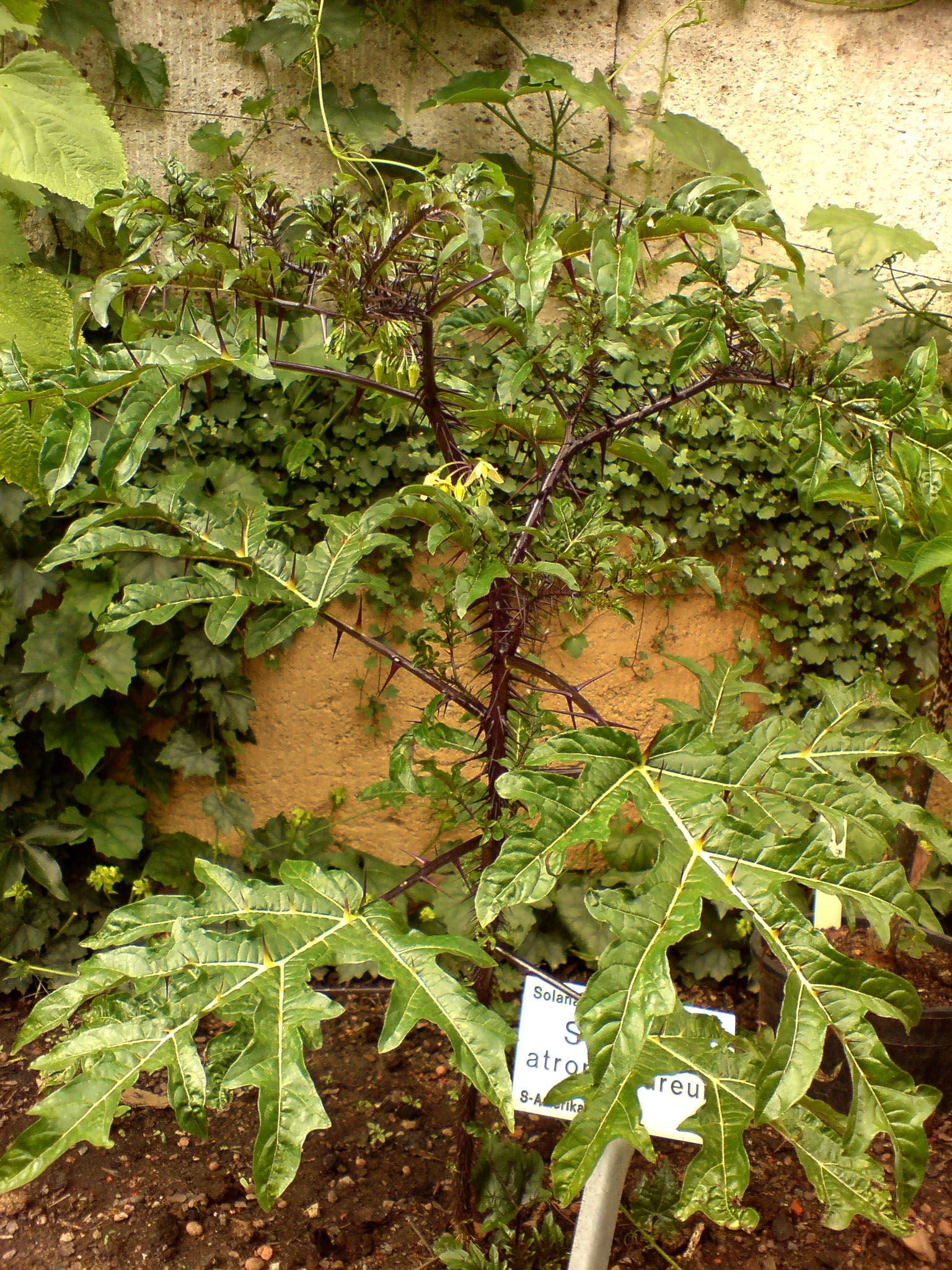
Shrub

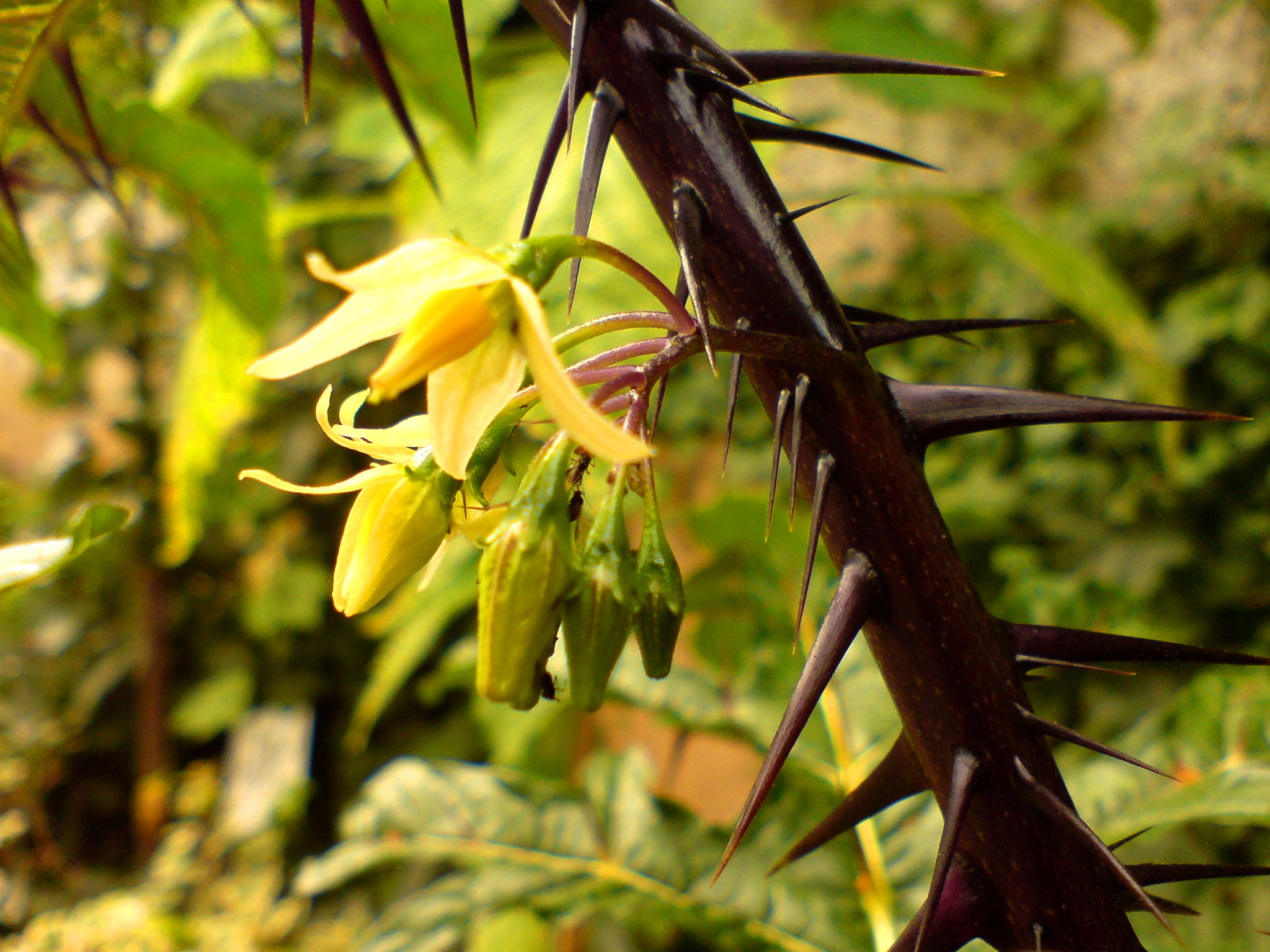
Branch

== Ecology ==
It is known as a natural reservoir of the potato virus X.

== Cultivation ==
The plant can be grown ornamentally, requiring full sun and modest water. The plant is known to grow in a wide variety of soils and can resist temperatures as low as −10 °C (14 °F) for a few days. Seeds can be harvested from the fruits, and stem cuttings can be used to grow the plant in about 10 to 20 days.

== Toxicity ==
S. atropurpureum contains various toxic tropane alkaloids in its fruit, stems, and leaves, and should not be ingested.
