= Most Valuable Players (film) =

- Directed by: Matthew D. Kallis
- Written by: Christopher Lockhart
- Produced by: Matthew D. Kallis; Christopher Lockhart
- Starring: Ali Mosser; Jennifer Wescoe; Katie Wexler; Zachary Gibson; Frank Anonia; Amanda Kostalis; John Andreadis
- Cinematography: Curt Apduhan
- Edited by: Zack Braff
- Music by: Randy Miller
- Production company: Canyonback Films
- Release date: August 6, 2010 (IDA Docuweek)
- Running time: 95 minutes
- Country: United States
- Language: English

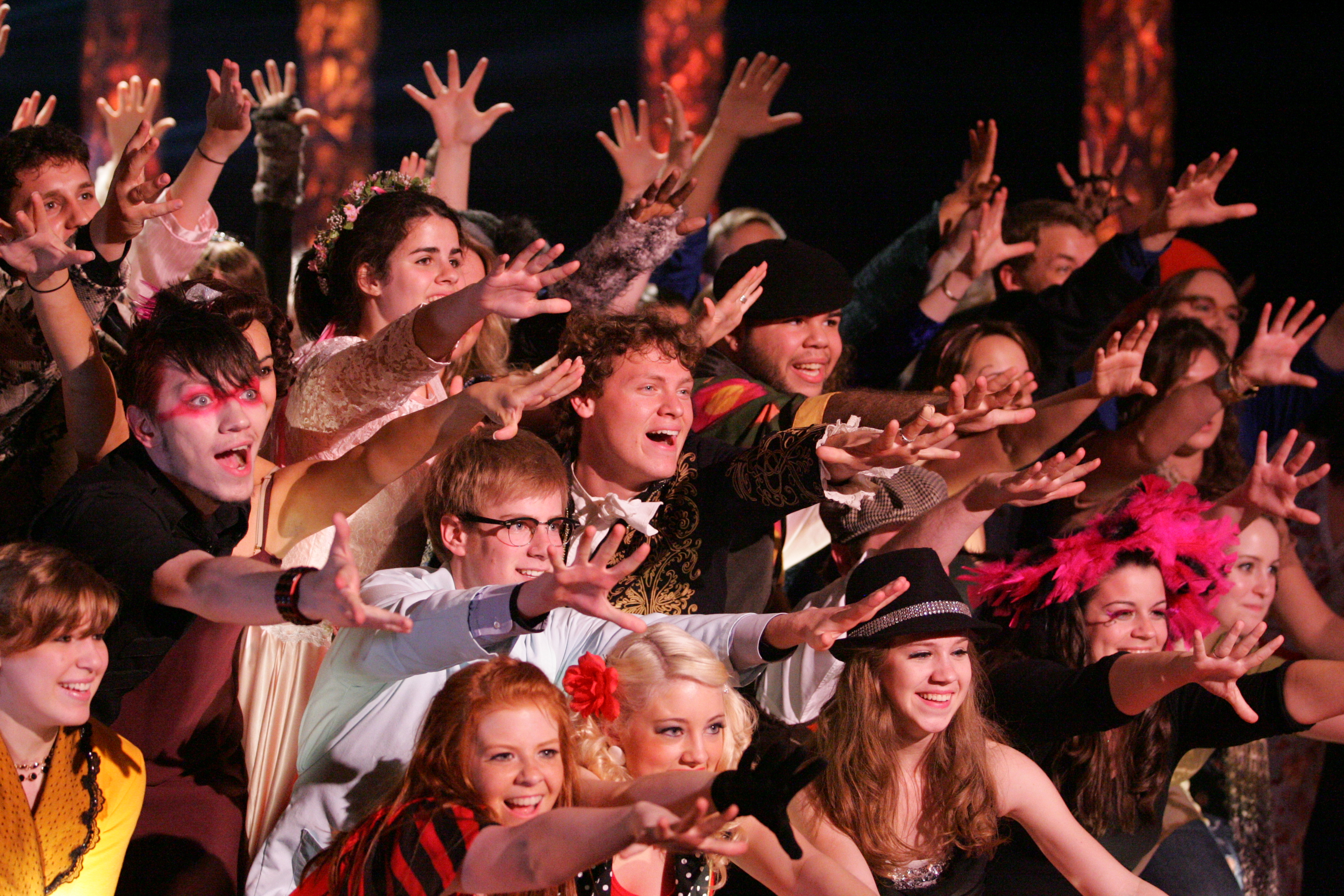

Most Valuable Players is a 2010 documentary film about The Freddy Awards, an annual awards ceremony recognizing outstanding high school musical theatre productions in the Lehigh Valley region of eastern Pennsylvania.

The film focuses primarily on three Pennsylvania schools: Emmaus High School in Emmaus, Parkland High School in Allentown, and Freedom High School in Bethlehem. By coincidence, both Emmaus and Parkland were presenting the musical Les Misérables the year Most Valuable Players was filmed, and the intense competition between the two school emerges as a central theme to the film.

The film appeared in the International Documentary Association's DocuWeeks showcase in August 2010 and at the Mill Valley Film Festival in California. In 2010, the Oprah Winfrey Network acquired the broadcast and video rights to the film.

The documentary is directed and co-produced by Matthew D. Kallis and written and co-produced by Christopher Lockhart. Lockhart was inspired to make the film after watching clips of a Freddy Awards production on YouTube.

== Background ==
The film documents the 2008 ceremony for the Freddy Awards, an annual award program for Lehigh Valley-based high school theatrical productions, which is held annually at State Theatre in Easton, Pennsylvania.

== Production ==
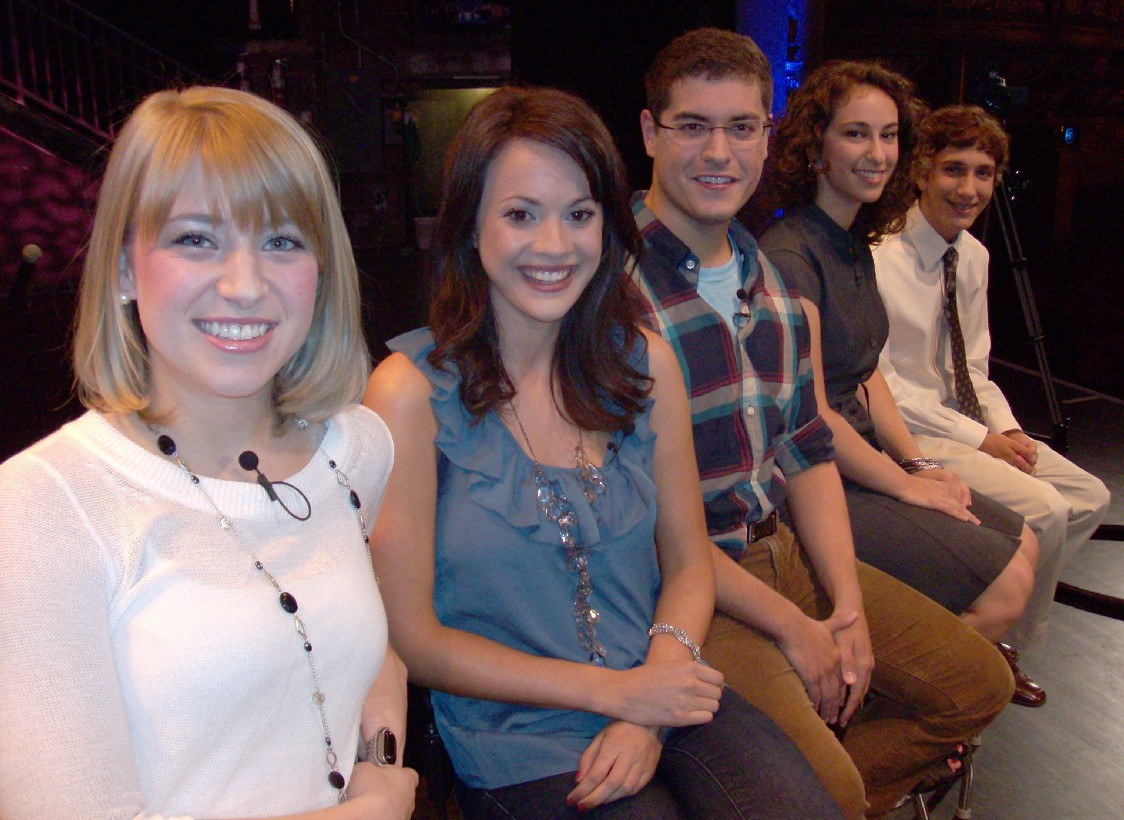
Five students prominently featured in Most Valuable Players (from left to right): Katie Wexler, Ali Mosser, John Andreadis, Amanda Kostalis, and Daniel Youngelman

Most Valuable Players is directed and produced by Matthew D. Kallis and written/produced by Christopher Lockhart. It was Lockhart's first documentary and, although Kallis had directed documentaries in the past, he had never done one to this scale. The film was conceived when Lockhart found a clip of the 2006 ceremony on YouTube while searching for something unrelated. Lockhart was impressed with the production values and performance caliber, and took the idea to Kallis, who agreed to partner with him for a documentary.

Kallis and Lockhart acquired over 300 hours of source material over four months, starting with 2008 high school rehearsals all the way up to the State Theatre ceremony on May 22, 2008. In addition to the event itself, the footage includes filming behind-the-scenes at production meetings, interviews with students and teachers, rehearsals at participating high schools, and the announcement of Freddy Award nominations. Cinematographer Curt Apduhan, who won an Emmy for the 2003 documentary Amargosa, served as director of photography. Ken King, winner of two Emmy Awards and nominated for a BAFTA for his work on the film Pulp Fiction, served as production sound mixer. Forty minutes of an original score was composed by Randy Miller.

Most Valuable Players runs 95 minutes long. The original working title was Freddy Fever. Lockhart said the new title demonstrates an analogy between sports and arts, adding, "In a way this plays like a sports documentary." The film focuses primarily on three Pennsylvania high schools: Emmaus High School in Emmaus, Parkland High School in Allentown, and Freedom High School in Bethlehem Township. By coincidence, both Emmaus and Parkland were presenting the musical Les Misérables the year Most Valuable Players was filmed, and the competition that arose made for one of the film's main conflicts.

The documentary originally included a ghost hunting sequence dealing with the urban legend of J. "Fred" Osterstock, for whom the Freddy Awards are named; Osterstock died in 1957, and the legend claims he still haunts the theater.

== Release ==
=== Debuts ===
The film's first public screening was on April 16, 2010, at State Theatre in Easton, Pennsylvania.

The film made its two theatrical debuts from August 6 to August 19, 2010 at IFC Center in Manhattan and ArcLight Hollywood in Hollywood, as part of the DocuWeeks showcase sponsored by the International Documentary Association. Most Valuable Players made its festival debut at the Mill Valley Film Festival in California in October 2010. Other festivals in 2011 included the St. Louis International Film Festival, Chicago International Children's Film Festival, Dallas International Film Festival, Toronto International Film Festival, and the Nashville Film Festival, where it won the Documentary Channel Audience award.

=== Television airing ===
In November 2010, the Oprah Winfrey Network announced it had acquired the rights for Most Valuable Players. On September 8, 2011, the network premiered the documentary.

=== DVD ===
The DVD was released by Virgil Films as part of the Ophrah Winfrey Network documentary club collection, and includes extras such as deleted scenes and filmmaker commentary. The movie streamed on Netflix for four years and currently streams on Amazon Prime.

== Reception ==
The documentary was met with generally positive reviews. Edge New York called it, "...high-spirited, yet topical and poignant." Variety, the Hollywood trade paper, referred to it as a "happy film." Hollywood Soapbox wrote the film "is an often moving account of talented teenagers striving for excellence." The Los Angeles Times was less enthused, calling the film "relentlessly peppy" and, while noting its "worthwhile intentions," criticized it for stoking "dreams of adulation too often at the expense of showing a creative end pursued for its own good."

Upon its premiere on the Oprah Winfrey Network, Matt Roush of TV Guide declared it "the Sleeper of the Week," calling the documentary "charming and disarming." Roush further wrote, "The camaraderie among the theater kids is touching and funny, and the emotion is palpable...I can't remember when I last enjoyed a Tony broadcast this much. A genuine treat." Star magazine rated it 3.5/4 stars. In a prologue recorded for the OWN broadcast, Rosie O'Donnell called the documentary "amazing," adding "it made me cry...." Screen Rant ranked it number one on its "List of 10 Must-See Documentaries for Musical Theater Buffs".

== Cast ==
- Ali Mosser
- Jennifer Wescoe
- Katie Wexler
- Zachary Gibson
- Frank Anonia
- Amanda Kostalis
- John Andreadis
- Jill Kuebler
- Rita Cortez
- Vic Kumma
- Shelley Brown
- Mark Stutz
