= Nolan Gerard Funk =

Canadian actor, singer and model

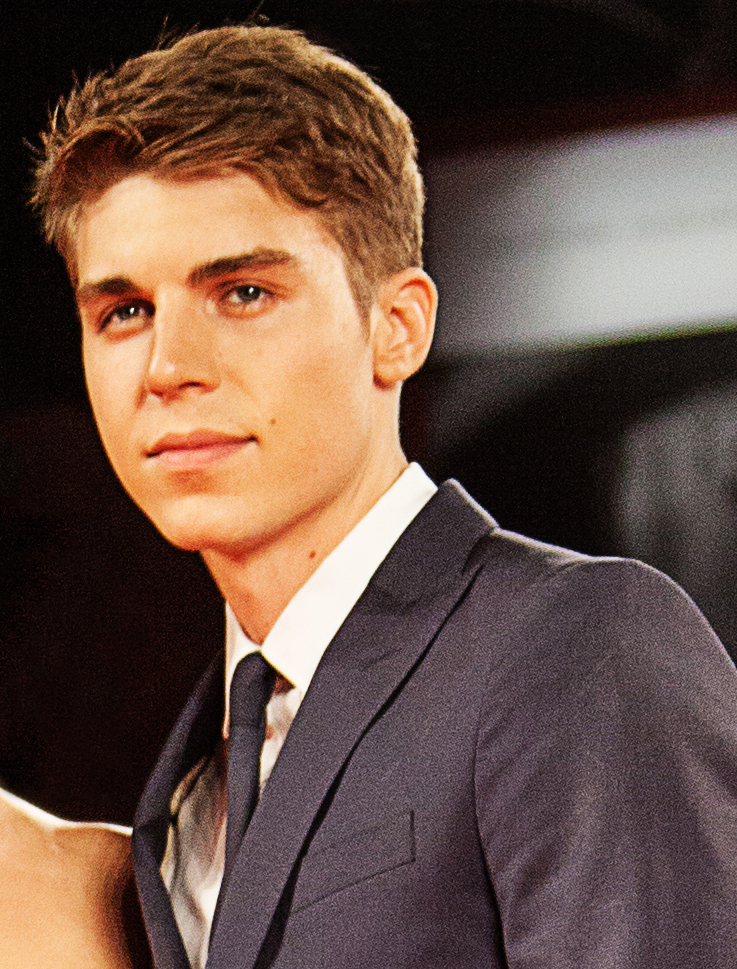
- Funk in 2013
- Born: July 28, 1986 (age 40); Vancouver, British Columbia, Canada
- Occupations: Actor; singer; model
- Years active: 2001–present

Nolan Gerard Funk (born July 28, 1986) is a Canadian actor and singer, known for portraying Hunter Clarington in the musical comedy-drama television series Glee, Collin Jennings in the comedy-drama television series Awkward, FBI agent Van White in The Flight Attendant, Angel Eyes in the drama series Counterpart and Conrad Birdie in the 2009 Broadway revival of the musical Bye Bye Birdie.

== Life and career ==
Funk was born in Vancouver, British Columbia. He is also a German citizen. He started doing gymnastics at age 3 and competed nationally in gymnastics until he was 12 after he quit due to a broken foot and then competed as a national diver.

In 2001, his first role came when he played a boy named Ryan in the Seven Days episode "The Brink". In 2002, he starred in the short film Moon in the Afternoon as Alexander and appeared in the Taken episode "High Hope" as Young Eric Crawford, produced by Steven Spielberg.

In 2003, he appeared in Marvel live-action film X2 as a captured X-Kid. From 2004 to 2006, he guest-starred in Renegadepress.com playing Ben Lalonde. In 2005, he appeared as Zack Greenfield in the Smallville episode "Krypto". In 2006, he played Josh in Hollow Man 2, appeared in the biographical film A Girl Like Me: The Gwen Araujo Story directed by Oscar Nominee Angnieszka Holland, playing Michael Imagidson.

In 2007, he starred in My Name Is Sarah opposite Jennifer Beals and had a recurring role in The CW series Aliens in America as a student named Todd Palladino. In 2008, he appeared in Miranda Cosgrove's music video for "Stay My Baby" as her love interest, appeared in Deadgirl as Dwyer which opened at TIFF.

He received his first break when he was cast opposite Tammin Sursok in the starring role of the Columbia Records/Nickelodeon movie Spectacular! On January 12, 2009, he had his first live concert performance at a Hard Rock Cafe in New York City.

He appeared in Lie To Me's pilot episode playing a boy named Dan; he appeared in Castle's episode "Hedge Fund Homeboys" playing a student named Brandon and appeared as Kevin in the 18 short films. In 2010, he appeared in Jack's Family Adventure as Derek Vickery, in Bereavement as William; he also had recurring roles in Warehouse 13 as Todd, Triple Dog as Todd Spalding and in Detroit 1-8-7 as Trevor Elkin.

Funk played the title role of Conrad Birdie in the revival of the Broadway musical Bye Bye Birdie, with a limited run at Henry Miller's Theatre from September 10, 2009 (previews) through January 24, 2010. Even though the show was mostly panned, he was a critical standout – cited as "Excellent" by John Lahr of The New Yorker, and receiving praise from New York Times critic Ben Brantley.

In 2012, Funk appeared opposite Jennifer Lawrence and Elisabeth Shue in House at the End of the Street.

Funk guest-starred in season four of Glee, playing Hunter Clarington, the new frontman of the Dalton Academy Warblers.

He then had a season long role in season three of the MTV comedy-drama series Awkward as Collin Jennings.

Funk starred alongside Lindsay Lohan and James Deen in the 2013 erotic thriller-drama film The Canyons, written by novelist Bret Easton Ellis and directed by Paul Schrader.

That same year, Funk appeared in the third installment of the Chronicles of Riddick film series, Riddick, playing a devoutly religious mercenary named Luna. The film was released on September 6, 2013, and opened at number one. In December 2013, Funk was announced as the face of Versace's spring/summer 2014 menswear campaign, photographed by famed photographers Mert Alas & Marcus Piggott.

Funk was a series regular on the first season of the critically acclaimed Starz series Counterpart starring J. K. Simmons. Funk spoke German in the show and played Angel Eyes, a cult-raised German assassin.

In 2019, Funk was cast as a series regular on the HBO Max series The Flight Attendant opposite Kaley Cuoco.

In 2022, Funk was a series regular in Netflix's Partner Track directed by Bridgerton's Julie Anne Robinson. While the show was not a critical success, Funk was recognized by Variety as one of the best parts of the show.

In 2023, Funk starred in the ABC pilot of LA Law directed by Anthony Hemingway, reuniting with his showrunner from Arrow, Marc Guggenheim. The status of the pilot remains in question.

In 2025, he had the starring role in AI thriller Raptus.

== Awards ==
In 2007, Funk was nominated for a Leo Award in the "Best Performance or Host in a Youth or Children's Program or Series" category for his work on Renegadepress.com.

In 2021, Funk was nominated for a Screen Actors Guild Award for Best Comedic Ensemble in The Flight Attendant.

== Filmography ==
Film roles
Year	Title	Role	Notes
2002	Moon in the Afternoon	Alexander	Short film
2003	X2	Captured X-Kid	
2006	Hollow Man 2	Josh	
2008	Deadgirl	Dwyer	
2008	Class Savage	Preppy dealer	Short film
2009	18	Kevin	Short film
2009	Spectacular!	Nikko Alexander	
2010	Bereavement	William	
2010	Triple Dog	Todd Spalding	
2012	House at the End of the Street	Tyler Reynolds	
2013	Evidence	Tyler Morris	
2013	The Canyons	Ryan	Credited as Nolan Funk
2013	Riddick	Luna	
2014	WildLike	Tommy	
2016	American Romance	Jeff Madison	Also executive producer
2017	Hello Again	Les (The Soldier)	
2018	Truth or Dare	Tyson Curran	
2019	Berlin, I Love You	Nico	
2022	The Long Night	Jack	
2025	Raptus	Raptus	
TBA	You Above All		Filming

Television roles
Year	Title	Role	Notes
2001	Seven Days	Ryan	Episode: "The Brink"
2002	Taken	Young Eric Crawford	Episode: "High Hopes"
2003	Romeo!	Booker	Episode: "Minimum Cool"
2004–2006	Renegadepress.com	Ben Lalonde	Recurring role, 7 episodes
2004	The L Word	Malcolm	Episode: "Losing It"
2005	Smallville	Zack Greenfield	Episode: "Krypto"
2006	Killer Instinct	Allan Harris	Episode: "While You Were Sleeping"
2006	The Dead Zone	Jake Phillips	Episode: "Independence Day"
2006	Alice, I Think	Daniel Feckworth-Goose	Episode: "Wise Womyn"
2006	Supernatural	Jake Tanner	Episode: "Croatoan"
2006	A Girl Like Me: The Gwen Araujo Story	Michael Magidson	Television film
2006	The Obsession	Jesse Sherman	Television film
2007	My Name Is Sarah	Kit	Television film
2007	Aliens in America	Todd Palladino	Recurring role, 5 episodes
2009	Lie to Me	Dan	Episode: "Pilot"
2009	Castle	Brandon	Episode: "Hedge Fund Homeboys"
2009	Spectacular!	Nikko Alexander	Television film
2010	Warehouse 13	Todd	4 episodes
2010	Detroit 1-8-7	Trevor Elkin	Episode: "Déjà Vu/All In"
2010	Hellcats	MC Petey B	Episode: "Think Twice Before You Go"
2010	Jack's Family Adventure	Derek Vickery	Television film
2012–2013	Glee	Hunter Clarington	Recurring role, 4 episodes
2013–2015	Awkward	Collin Jennings	Recurring role (season 3), 16 episodes
2014	PopFan	Xavier	Television film
2014–2016	Arrow	Cooper Seldon/Brother Eye	3 episodes
2017	Quantico	Daniel Sharp	1 episode
2017	The Catch	Troy	3 episodes
2017	Dear White People	Addison	2 episodes
2017	Major Crimes	Seth Landon	4 episodes
2018	Counterpart	Angel Eyes	Recurring role
2018	The Marvelous Mrs. Maisel	Josh	2 episodes
2020	The Flight Attendant	Van White	Main role (season 1); Nominated — Screen Actors Guild Award for Outstanding Performance by an Ensemble in a Comedy Series
2022	Partner Track	Dan Fallon	Main role
2024	Five Gold Rings		Television film
