= The Florentine =

- Theatrical release poster
- Directed by: Nick Stagliano
- Written by: Tom Benson; Damien Gray
- Produced by: Francis Ford Coppola; Nick Stagliano; Steven Weisman
- Starring: Jeremy Davies; Michael Madsen; Chris Penn; Luke Perry; Tom Sizemore; Virginia Madsen; Mary Stuart Masterson; Hal Holbrook; Burt Young; James Belushi
- Cinematography: Stephen Kazmierski
- Edited by: Plummy Tucker
- Music by: Marco Beltrami
- Production companies: American Zoetrope; Nazz Productions
- Distributed by: New Films International
- Release date: April 19, 1999 (Los Angeles Independent Film Festival)
- Running time: 104 minutes
- Country: United States
- Language: English
- Budget: $2 million

The Florentine is a 1999 American drama film directed by Nick Stagliano and produced by Francis Ford Coppola's American Zoetrope. It stars Jeremy Davies, Michael Madsen, and Chris Penn.

The film was shot in the Lehigh Valley in Pennsylvania in the cities of Allentown, Bethlehem, Easton, and in the Lehigh Valley borough of Hellertown.

== Plot ==
As the owner of the Florentine—a working-class bar in an economically depressed town—Whitey (Michael Madsen) dispenses drinks to a number of troubled locals. Among the regulars there are compulsive gambler Bobby (Chris Penn) and Whitey's sister, Molly (Virginia Madsen), who is preparing to get married when her old flame, Teddy (Tom Sizemore), returns to the area. Whitey and Bobby must contend with a no-nonsense mobster who is squeezing them both for money.

== Cast ==
- Jeremy Davies as Truby
- Michael Madsen as "Whitey"
- Chris Penn as Bobby
- Luke Perry as Frankie
- Tom Sizemore as Teddy Finn
- Virginia Madsen as Molly
- Mary Stuart Masterson as Vikki
- Hal Holbrook as "Smitty"
- Burt Young as Joe McCollough
- James Belushi as Billy Belasco
- Lillo Brancato as "Pretty"
- Jill Hennessy as Brenda
- Maeve Quinlan as Claire
- James McCaffrey as Jack Ryan

== Reception ==
With a conspicuous heart on its sleeve, "The Florentine" can't break away from its verbose theatrical origins. Helmed by multifaceted industry vet Nick Stagliano, this paean to small-town American values is painfully earnest and determinedly old-fashioned in style and themes. While it's raised above the norm by a cast full of thesp heavyweights, pic is ultimately undone by a distracting spread of novelistic story strands and a deadly, repetitive series of two-character dialogue scenes. A distrib may end up going for this quaint, besotted bit of Americana, but the gabfest will be restricted to English-only markets, with betterafterlife on vid.

— Variety
