= Malevolence (film) =

2003 film by Stevan Mena

- Directed by: Stevan Mena
- Written by: Stevan Mena
- Produced by: Stevan Mena
- Starring: Samantha Dark; R. Brandon Johnson; Heather Magee; Richard Glover; Courtney Bertolone
- Cinematography: Tsuyoshi Kimoto
- Edited by: Stevan Mena; Eddie Akmal
- Music by: Stevan Mena
- Distributed by: Anchor Bay Films
- Release dates: July 14, 2003 (Long Island Film Expo); September 10, 2004 (U.S.)
- Running time: 86 minutes
- Country: United States
- Language: English
- Budget: $200,000
- Box office: $346,085

Malevolence is a 2003 American slasher film written, produced and directed by Stevan Mena, and starring Samantha Dark and R. Brandon Johnson. The plot follows a mother and her adolescent daughter who are held hostage by bank robbers at an abandoned house; the robbers' plans are disrupted when they are all confronted by a serial killer who resides on a nearby property.

Filmed over a period of two years on a budget of $200,000, Malevolence was purchased by Anchor Bay Films, who gave it a limited theatrical release in September 2004, and a DVD release in 2005. It received mixed reviews from critics, with some criticizing its referentiality and depiction of violence, while others praised it for its establishment of atmosphere and suspense.

Malevolence spawned a film franchise with a follow-up prequel in 2010 titled Bereavement and a sequel titled Malevolence 3: Killer in 2018.

== Plot ==
On May 14, 1989, six-year-old abductee Martin Bristol, whose face has been disfigured by his captor, watches as he butchers a young woman in the basement of a farmhouse.

Ten years later, on September 20, 1999, Julian and his girlfriend Marylin enact a bank heist with Marylin's ex-convict brother, Max, and accomplice Kurt, taking around $500,000. Max, who was shot by a security guard in the melee, dies in the car with Julian and Marylin; Kurt leaves in a separate car with the money, but breaks down en route to their meeting place: an abandoned house in the woods. Kurt takes Samantha Harrison and her adolescent daughter, Courtney, hostage from a gas station, forcing them to drive him to the house.

When they arrive, he binds and gags them, and leaves a large portion of the money stowed in the van. Courtney manages to free herself and flees, stumbling upon a large abandoned farm nearby. In pursuit, Kurt searches a vacant garage on the property before entering a house, which is dilapidated and filled with degraded furnishings. Inside, he is clobbered with a metal pulley and stabbed to death by an unseen assailant.

After burying Max's body in a field, Julian and Marylin drive to the abandoned house to meet with Kurt and divide the money. Arriving at nightfall, they find Samantha tied up and sleeping on the floor, and Kurt nowhere in sight. Julian takes his car to search for Kurt, leaving Marylin alone at the house with Samantha. From the foyer, Samantha watches as a man wearing Kurt's sack mask descends the stairs, but is unable to warn Marylin as her mouth is taped shut. The man drags Marylin into the dining room and stabs her to death. Meanwhile, while driving on backroads, Julian catches the attention of a parked police officer, and quickly retreats to the house, where he finds the entryway floor soaked in blood, and Samantha hiding in a closet. Samantha tells him that Kurt returned to the house and killed Marylin.

Julian and Samantha leave on foot to search for Courtney, and also stumble upon the adjacent farm property. While investigating the house there, they find Courtney locked in an upstairs closet with Kurt's corpse. As Samantha unties Courtney's arms, the man in the sack mask attacks Julian and incapacitates Samantha and Courtney. Samantha awakens in the basement hanging from the ceiling. As the killer approaches her with a knife, she manages to pull down the metal piping from the ceiling, freeing herself, and flees with Courtney. The killer pursues them, and Julian is left alone in the farm, where he discovers numerous corpses in various states of decay, and finds Marylin's body posed against an arrangement of human and animal bones.

Samantha and Courtney return to the adjacent house to retrieve the van keys. As they are about to leave, Samantha sees the killer coming toward the house, and the two retreat to a bedroom upstairs to hide, but the killer finds and attacks them. Julian arrives and shoots him, but he does not die immediately. Samantha smashes a chair over the killer's head, knocking him unconscious. Julian removes his mask, revealing a young man with a scar across his face; the killer is Martin Bristol, now a teenager. The three flee, and the police officer arrives at the house just as Samantha and Courtney exit. Julian stumbles out after them holding a gun, and the officer shoots him to death. When the officer goes upstairs to locate Martin, he has vanished.

The following morning, forensic investigators remove numerous bodies from the farm property, and uncover journals from the serial killer who abducted Martin and groomed him to be a killer himself. The journals suggest that Martin, who gained strength as he grew into adulthood, killed his abductor in the manners in which he was taught. That evening, Samantha prepares to go to bed; on the floor is the duffel bag full of the money that Kurt left in her van. While she and Courtney lie down to sleep, the closet door behind them opens.

== Cast ==
- Samantha Dark as Samantha Harrison
- R. Brandon Johnson as Julian
- Heather Magee as Marylin
- Richard Glover as Kurt
- Courtney Bertolone as Courtney Harrison
- John Richard Ingram as Sheriff Riley
- Keith Chambers as Max
- Jay Cohen as Martin Bristol
  - David K. Guida II as Martin Bristol (six years old)
- Kevin McKelvey as Special Agent William Perkins

== Production ==
=== Development ===
Writer and director Stevan Mena began working on the script for the film in 1995, which went through various iterations. In it, he said his intentions were to craft a slasher film that also explored the idea of nature versus nurture in relation to how people become serial killers.

=== Casting ===
Samantha Dark, a British actress, was cast in the lead role of Samantha after responding to a casting call published by Mena in Backstage. Her character was originally written to have a New Jersey accent, but Mena opted to have Dark speak with her natural British accent. Mena cast his niece, Courtney Bertolone, as Samantha's daughter.

According to actor R. Brandon Johnson, he was the last of 400 actors to audition for the role of Julian.

=== Filming ===
Principal photography of Malevolence took place over a period of two years between late 2000 and December 2002. The film was shot on 35mm film by documentary cinematographer Tsuyoshi Kimono, who had previously shot documentaries for the television network A&E. Various production setbacks occurred, one of which included the crew being banned from the original shooting location in Long Island: The production crew received permission to use an abandoned home in which to shoot the film, only to discover two days before principal photography that the home had in fact been foreclosed on, and the man who gave them the permission was the former owner.

The majority of filming took place in Lehigh County, Pennsylvania. The bank robbery scenes were shot in Allentown, and additional photography in the car scenes was shot in Bethlehem. The farm and slaughterhouse property was shot at an actual abandoned cattle farm and slaughterhouse built in 1920, located in Ballietsville.

=== Release ===
Malevolence premiered on July 14, 2003 at the Long Island International Film Expo, and was later screened at the Screamfest Horror Film Festival in Los Angeles on October 13, 2003.

The film was acquired by Anchor Bay Films, who gave it a limited theatrical release in the United States, opening it in the New York City area on September 10, 2004. An exclusive west coast premiere followed in the Portland, Oregon metropolitan area on October 16, 2004. It also screened in Winston-Salem, North Carolina, beginning November 12, 2004. The film continued to have regional releases into the following year, screening in Detroit and Ann Arbor, Michigan in late January 2005; in Minneapolis, Minnesota beginning January 28, 2005; in St. George, Utah beginning March 11, 2005; and in Miami, Florida beginning April 8, 2005.

In Spain, the film was distributed by Sherlock Films and opened in 101 theaters.

=== Home media ===
Anchor Bay Entertainment released Malevolence on DVD on April 19, 2005.

== Reception ==
=== Box office ===
The film grossed $126,021 in the United States and $220,085 internationally for a worldwide box office of $346,085. Nearly half of its international box office came from Spain, grossing over $131,000 there.

=== Critical response ===
On the review aggregator website Rotten Tomatoes, 35% of 17 critics' reviews are positive, with an average rating of 4.8/10.

Ned Martel of The New York Times said the film "will lead Halloween-inspired viewers into this dark place for some palpitations, but the thrills will come from sheer density of gruesome images, not from frightfully new ideas." Variety's Dennis Harvey said of the film: "The mark of a good horror director is seldom in onscreen gore, but rather the ability to make every anticipatory moment tingle with dread. On that level, Stevan Mena’s first feature Malevolence scores well, building a grim atmosphere sans Scream-style winking to tell its tale of bank robbers who choose the wrong abandoned rural house to hide out in."

M. E. Russell of The Oregonian praised the film as "screamingly good," stating: "Malevolence gets so much absolutely right that it's mildly stunning." Michael Gingold of Fangoria gave the film a favorable review, commending its atmosphere and retro-inspired style, deeming it an "unpretentious but accomplished debut."

Robert Dominiquez of the New York Daily News gave the film 1.5 out of 4 stars, writing that the film "turns out to be nothing more than a derivative thriller featuring yet another silent, masked killer. Mena has a gift for sustaining tension, and there are a couple of moments that make you jump. But the acting and dialogue is as silly as the potato sack the killer wears on his head." Maitland McDonagh of TV Guide awarded the film 2 out of 4 stars, writing, calling it "a straightforward throwback to old-school slasher movies that wears its influences on its bloody sleeve and delivers a solid ratio of suspense to shocks." Mark Holcomb of The Village Voice panned the film, calling it "laughably unscary," and marked by "dimensionless medium shots and ham-fisted symbolic imagery."

=== Accolades ===
Award/association	Year	Category	Result	Ref.
Long Island International Film Expo	2003	Best Feature Film – 35mm	Won	
New York City Horror Film Festival	2003	Best Feature Film	Won	

== Sequel and prequel ==
On February 2, 2010, Mena announced that he planned a prequel to his film. The film, Bereavement, was theatrically released in March 2011 and stars Michael Biehn, John Savage, Nolan Gerard Funk, and Alexandra Daddario.

A sequel Malevolence 3: Killer was released on October 12, 2018 along with Blu-ray re-releases of the first 2 movies.
