= Bereavement (film) =

Malevolence 2: Bereavement
- Official release poster
- Directed by: Stevan Mena
- Written by: Stevan Mena
- Produced by: Stevan Mena
- Starring: Michael Biehn; Alexandra Daddario; Brett Rickaby; John Savage; Spencer List; Valentina de Angelis; Nolan Gerard Funk; Kathryn Meisle; Peyton List
- Cinematography: Marco Cappeta
- Edited by: Steven Mena
- Music by: Steven Mena
- Production company: Crimson Film
- Distributed by: Anchor Bay Entertainment; Mena Films
- Release dates: July 16, 2010 (Long Island International Film Expo); March 4, 2011 (United States)
- Running time: 109 minutes
- Country: United States
- Language: English
- Budget: $2 million
- Box office: $43,712

Bereavement (also known as Malevolence 2: Bereavement) is a 2010 American crime horror film directed by Stevan Mena and starring Michael Biehn, Brett Rickaby, Alexandra Daddario, Nolan Gerard Funk, and Spencer List. It serves as a prequel to 2004's Malevolence, and is the second installment in the titular film series. The plot takes place chronologically prior to the previous installment, with the story centering around an abducted six-year-old boy (List) who is forced to bear witness to the crimes of a madman (Rickaby) for five whole gruesome years.

The film premiered at the Long Island International Film Expo on July 16, 2010, before being released to theaters on March 4, 2011. It received mixed reviews from critics and grossed $43,712 against a $2 million budget. A sequel titled Malevolence 3: Killer was released in 2018.

== Plot ==
Martin Bristol, a young boy with congenital analgesia, is kidnapped by psychotic and bereaved serial killer Graham Sutter. At an abandoned slaughterhouse once operated by his family, Graham cuts Martin's cheek before butchering a captive young woman in front of him. Martin attempts to escape, but Graham catches him and returns him to the slaughterhouse, where he continues to hold the boy and future female victims captive.

Over the next five years, Graham brutally butchers several young women, forcing Martin to watch as the trauma slowly desensitizes him. Graham, who feels guilt over killing the cattle he cared for at the slaughterhouse, talks and argues with the skull of a bull hung on the wall, apparently seeing it, and numerous others like it, around the property as some kind of mighty deity. It is strongly implied that Graham was abused by his father and eventually murdered him, keeping his corpse concealed under a sheet in the attic.

After the death of her parents, young Allison Miller comes to live with her paternal uncle Jonathan, her aunt Karen, and her cousin Wendy in Minersville, the same town where Graham commits his crimes. While out for a run, she sees Martin from the window of the supposedly abandoned slaughterhouse next to Graham's farmhouse. When she is almost hit by a truck, she meets a local boy, William, with whom she forms a relationship of sorts. One night, Jonathan intervenes as Allison and William are about to have sex.

The next day, Allison goes to the farmhouse after again seeing Martin in the slaughterhouse window and is captured by Graham. When she doesn't return home, Jonathan drives to the farmhouse, looking for her, but Graham shoots him dead. William, also searching for Allison, sees Jonathan's abandoned car and finds Allison locked inside a cold meat room when he investigates. William attempts to save her, but is killed by Graham. Graham has become fearful of Martin because of his inability to feel pain, and pins his hand to the kitchen table with a knife to prevent him from leaving the slaughterhouse. Allison escapes by pushing a metal rod through a hole in the door and lifting the lock mechanism. She finds Martin with his hand still pinned on the kitchen table and removes the knife before carrying him out of the farmhouse.

Graham takes Jonathan's body to his home, and attacks Karen, who tells Wendy to run. Wendy runs upstairs and hides in her closet, tearfully listening to her mother die. Allison arrives at the house, just as Graham has set it on fire. Graham finds Wendy and decides to use her to replace Martin as his assistant, but Allison interrupts and stabs Graham, causing him to flee. Allison attempts to call 911, but Martin stabs her to death, his mind now completely twisted by years of Graham's abuse. He then kills Wendy before leaving the burning house. Martin returns to the farmhouse and attacks the injured Graham with an axe. Graham thanks Martin before being hacked to death. The next morning, the authorities arrive at the smoldering ruins of the Miller house and rule it an accident.

Martin begins to construct a new skeletal shrine in the farmhouse, with the bull's skull as the head. He then stares out the window, waiting for his next victim.

In a post-credit scene set five years later, a girl named Courtney Harrison flees from an unseen pursuer. She enters the farmhouse and discovers Martin, who is now older, sitting at a table. When she asks for help, Martin slowly turns around, as the film ends.

== Cast ==
- Michael Biehn as Jonathan Miller
- Alexandra Daddario as Allison Miller
- Brett Rickaby as Graham Sutter
- Nolan Gerard Funk as William
- Spencer List as Martin Bristol
  - Chase Pechacek as Martin Bristol At Age 6
- John Savage as Ted
- Peyton List as Wendy Miller
- Kathryn Meisle as Karen Miller
- Valentina de Angelis as Melissa

Additionally, Ashley Wolfe portrays Katherine Bristol, Martin's mother, and Andrea Havens portrays Agatha. Appearing as victims of Graham are Marissa Guill as the first young woman killed before Martin and Shannon Lambert-Ryan as Lucy, the corpse Allison finds in the freezer. John Richard Ingram reprises his role as Sheriff Riley from Malevolence in an uncredited appearance. Jay Cohen and Courtney Bertolone appear as a teenager Martin Bristol and Courtney Harrison in the post-credits scene.

== Production ==
During post-production, director Stevan Mena's initial cut of the film was three hours long. Things cut from the film included overtly gory scenes. The film is a prequel to Malevolence, stating "The only way to describe it is like an epic horror story. It's more in the vein of The Shining, whereas the original was kind of like Halloween or Friday the 13th. Bereavement is more of a character study".

== Release ==
The film was shown at the Long Island International Film Expo on July 16, 2010. The film was released in theaters by Anchor Bay Entertainment on March 4, 2011.

A director's cut of the film, retitled Malevolence 2: Bereavement, was released to home media by Mena Films on October 12, 2018.

== Reception ==
On Rotten Tomatoes the film has a 44% rating based on 18 reviews, with an average score of 5.30/10.

Frank Scheck of The Hollywood Reporter called it "more stylishly filmed than many others of its ilk, but at the end of the day, is just an ordinary slasher film." Paul Brunick of The New York Times criticized the film's emphasis on violence, commenting that "The excruciating acts of violence are somewhat offset by Mr. Mena's pictorial grace notes: the rustling landscapes of amber wheat, the detailed Americana of rural homesteads. But frankly, I'd sooner touch a nine-volt battery to my tongue than sit through this film again." Dread Central's Steve Barton gave the film a 3 out of 5 stars and said, "Fans of Malevolence will most likely eat this one up because it truly plays like one person's nightmarish descent into a world of total madness. It gives you a feel for who Martin Bristol is and why he's so lethal. On that level, the film is a complete success. We just wish there was an just as successful editor to go along with it."
