= Brutal Massacre =

- Directed by: Stevan Mena
- Written by: Stevan Mena
- Produced by: Chris Aurilia; Jerry Aurilia; Tom Bambard; Timothy J. Bristoll; Stevan Mena
- Starring: David Naughton; Brian O'Halloran; Gerry Bednob; Gunnar Hansen; Ellen Sandweiss; Vincent Butta; Ken Foree; Emily Brownell; Michelle DiBenedetti; Bill Sorice
- Cinematography: Brendan Flynt
- Edited by: Stevan Mena
- Music by: Stevan Mena
- Production companies: Aurilia Arts Productions; Crimson Films
- Distributed by: Anchor Bay Entertainment
- Release date: July 13, 2007
- Running time: 94 minutes
- Country: United States
- Language: English
- Budget: $400,000 (estimated)

Brutal Massacre is a 2007 American mockumentary comedy written and directed by Stevan Mena, and produced by Stevan Mena, Chris Aurilia, Jerry Aurilia, Tom Bambard, Timothy J. Bristoll, and Vincent Butta in association with the Aurilia Arts Productions and Crimson Films. The film stars David Naughton, Brian O'Halloran, Gerry Bednob, Ellen Sandweiss, Vincent Butta, and Ken Foree.

== Synopsis ==
Harry Penderecki (David Naughton), a once heralded horror auteur, finds himself on the outside looking in at Hollywood. He hasn't had a hit film in years, and most in the industry, including his close friends, think he is washed up. Harry is given one last chance to redeem himself with what could be his best or last picture.

Brutal Massacre becomes just that as the cast and crew find themselves battling one mishap after another as Harry struggles to keep his sanity against overwhelming resistance to finish the picture and find himself at the top once again.

== Cast ==
- David Naughton as Harry Penderecki
- Brian O'Halloran as Jason "Jay" Daly
- Gerry Bednob as Hanu Vindepeshs
- Gunnar Hansen as Krenshaw
- Ellen Sandweiss as Natalie Vasquez
- Vincent Butta as Bert Campbell
- Ken Foree as Carl Perkins
- Mick Garris as Himself
- Happy Anderson as Ivan
- Betsy Baker as Gladys Oppenheimer
- Tom Bambard as Barry Tideman
- Emily Brownell as Amy Mills
- Samantha Dark as Terry
- Michelle DiBenedetti as Tanya Ferrell
- Arthur Friedman as Marvin Foy
- Jody Ebert as Thomas, The Editor
- Bob Gellock as Bob Millman / Grim Reaper Victim / Zombie
- Ronald E. Giles as Barney
- Frederic Heringes as Harlan
- Billy Lake as Earl Shanksmith
- Chris Line as Trevor Nelson / Crazed Fan
- Matt Lish as Andy
- Trevor Long as Ronaldo
- Alex Lubar as Stan
- Laia Marti as Alissa Arango
- Hiro Masuda as Honda
- Kathy McAuley as Kathy MacElravey, Location Scout
- Dan Nelson as Louis
- Scott McKlveen as Ralph Innerds
- Rachael Robbins as Mandy Less
- Bill Sorice as Oscar Brody
- Tom Stratford as Arthur Benjamin
- Tighe Swanson as Mike
- Richard Vallejos as Felipe Vargas
- Bob Weston as Ted, The Security Guard
- Kim Mahoney as Dead Carl
- Bill Duff as The Killer
- Bill Vargo as Sheriff #1
- Kelly Lee Drust as Sheriff #2
- Josslyn DeCrosta as Audition Girl #1
- Laura Bozzone as Audition Girl #2
- Bronagh Lawe as Hot Tub Girl #1
- Maeve Lawe as Hot Tub Girl #2
- Killer Koala as Himself
- Robert L. Brodmerkel as Jimmy (uncredited)
- Scott W. Perry as Billy (uncredited)
- Seann Sara Sella as Model (uncredited)
- Theresa Tilly as Waitress
