= Super Mario Bros. speedrunning =

Act of beating the 1985 video game quickly

- An attempt of the Bullet Bill glitch
- Video game: Super Mario Bros.
- Release: September 13, 1985
- Earliest speedrun: 9:51 by Casion; April 1999
- World record: Any% 4:54.299 by Niftski; October 31, 2026: Warpless 18:49.972 by Niftski August 7, 2025; Any% All-Stars 4:55.780 by Niftski May 28, 2023; Warpless All-Stars 19:42.885 by Niftski October 1, 2023; Glitchless 5:02.685 by Niftski January 27, 2024
- Tool-assisted world record: Any% 4:54.032 by HappyLee; January 6, 2011: RTA Rules 4:54.265 by Maru371 April 29, 2019
- Notable community members: andrewg, averge11, darbian, HappyLee, KingOfJonnyBoy, Kosmic, Kriller37, LeKukie, Miniland, Niftski, Scott Kessler, sockfolder, somewes
- Leaderboard: SRC
- Total runners: 2,180 (since 2002)
- Last updated: November 1, 2026

Super Mario Bros., a 1985 platform game released for the Nintendo Entertainment System, is a popular game in speedrunning. It has seen a consistently high level of attention since 2010, when American speedrunner Andrew Gardikis, also known as andrewg, beat the game in under five minutes for the first time. It is one of the most optimized games in speedrunning. The current world record of 4:54.299, set by American speedrunner Niftski on October 31, 2026, is two frames (32.8 milliseconds) off what is believed to be a theoretically perfect run of 4:54.265.

Speedrunners use a number of advanced techniques and glitches to improve their performance and achieve new personal bests. These techniques, including wrong warps and the flagpole glitch, have become more effective over time thanks to collaboration among a community of speedrunners and glitch hunters. The activity is not regulated by a formal organization but is instead moderated by a team of volunteers from the community. Top speedrunners often stream attempts to achieve personal bests live on Twitch. Notable former world record holders include andrewg, darbian, and Kosmic.

== History ==
=== Early competition ===
The earliest recorded speedrun of Super Mario Bros. was performed by Japanese player Casion (カシオン, kashion) in April 1999. Casion performed the run on an emulator for the website High Level Challenge, and achieved a time of 9:51. Early on, completion times were recorded by Twin Galaxies which prohibited the use of unintended game mechanics and glitches. In 2004, American speedrunner Scott Kessler submitted a new world record of 5:14 (Note: 5:17 (Twin Galaxies timing)) (Note: Modern runs use a different timing method compared to Twin Galaxies. Twin Galaxies' timing started after the runner pressed start on the title screen. Modern timing, first used by Speed Demos Archive, starts when the in-game timer appears in World 1-1 which occurs about three seconds later.) to Twin Galaxies, beating the best known time by three seconds. Over the next three years, Kessler faced competition from fellow speedrunners Trevor Seguin and Andrew Gardikis, an American speedrunner also known as andrewg.

In 2007, andrewg submitted his first run to Speed Demos Archive which did allow the use of glitches in runs. His first submitted time with glitches completed the game in 5:00.355. He used a wrong warp glitch in World 4-2 and a wall jump in World 8-4, which helped him to save over five seconds. On December 24, 2010, andrewg became the first person to complete the game in under five minutes, with a time of 4:59.690. Over the course of the next three years, andrewg continued to improve his own time, bringing the record down to 4:58.092 in March 2014. He had since implemented a strategy known as "fast 4-2", a harder version of the wrong warp glitch with a much lower success rate.

In June 2014, Blubbler beat andrewg's time by 399 milliseconds, achieving a time of 4:57.693. They were the first person to beat andrewg's time in seven years. Blubbler achieved this time by being the first to implement the Bullet Bill glitch, but opted not to attempt "fast 4-2". On October 18, 2015, a relative newcomer to the speedrunning scene named Brad Myers, better known as darbian, completed the game in 4:57.627, setting a new world record. In January 2016, darbian managed to perform both the Bullet Bill glitch and "fast 4-2" in a single run, improving his time down to 4:57.427. Following the run, darbian set a goal for himself to get the "perfect" speedrun, a run with the Bullet Bill glitch, "fast 4-2", and a well executed World 8-4. In April 2016, darbian achieved this "perfect" time with a 4:57.260, claiming that he had "reached [his] potential in this category".

=== Implementation of the flagpole glitch ===
In September 2016, a new method of performing the flagpole glitch was published to YouTube. The glitch had previously been used by tool-assisted speedruns but was thought to be impossible to perform in real time. Glitch hunter Chris Milling, better known as sockfolder, discovered a consistent, run-viable method of performing the trick, which began being implemented in runs by darbian and longtime speedrunner Kosmic. Kosmic had been performing at the top level since 2013 but had yet to achieve a world record. In October 2016, Kosmic managed to beat darbian's record with a time of 4:57.194, using the new flagpole glitch in World 1-1 and 4-1, but losing a framerule in 8-2 from a slow bullet bill glitch. Two days later, darbian took the record back with a time of 4:56.878, breaking the 4:57 barrier by saving the framerule in 8-2 that Kosmic had lost. One more flagpole glitch in 8-3 allowed darbian to drop the record to 4:56.528 on October 20, 2017.

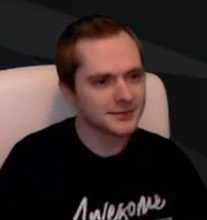
American speedrunner Kosmic (pictured in 2019) was the first person to complete Super Mario Bros. in 4 minutes, 55 seconds.

Kosmic took the world record back in February 2018. In September 2018, he broke the 4:56 barrier, achieving a time of 4:55.913 by implementing a wall clip in World 1-2 to get to the warp zone faster. At the time, Kosmic faced competition from two other runners: somewes, who took the world record twice in 2018; and tavenwebb2002, who took the world record in 2019.

=== Tying the theoretical limit ===
In 2020, Niftski, a prominent speedrunner who had entered the scene the previous year, started using a faster 8-2 strategy in his runs, which helped him reach his first world record of 4:55.430. Niftski's world record was improved twice in early 2021 by Miniland, who got the time down to 4:55.230. With that run, the difference between the world record and the theoretical perfect run of 4:54.265 became less than a second. A race to break the final 4:55 barrier was started between Niftski, LeKukie, Miniland, Thelxinoe, Tree_05, AldynSpeedruns, and jscarbo. On April 7, 2021, Niftski broke the barrier by implementing a flagpole glitch and fast acceleration in World 8-1, getting a time of 4:54.948. Kyle Orland of Ars Technica described this accomplishment as "speedrunning’s version of the four-minute mile".

On September 6, 2023, Niftski improved his time to 4:54.631 with a new strategy for the wrong warp in World 4-2: "Lightning 4-2". This strategy was first theorized by HappyLee in 2018, but was thought to be too difficult to perform outside of a tool-assisted speedrun. "Lightning 4-2" allowed runners to match all of the frame rules possible in a theoretically perfect speedrun for the first time. Future runs would only be able to save time on the last level, World 8-4. In August 2025, Niftski obtained a new world record of 18:49.972 in the warpless category, beating his previous record by more than five seconds. This was the largest improvement in a single run of the category in over 10 years.

On September 30, 2025, a bounty was announced by the woodworking company Wyrmwood: the Super Mario Bros. speedrun world record holder as of January 1, 2026, would receive $5,000 and a Mario-themed table. After two consecutive records by Niftski on October 9 and 23, averge11 reclaimed the record on December 18, winning the bounty and setting a time of 4:54.415, nine frames (150 milliseconds) behind a theoretically perfect run. In June 2026, Brazilian speedrunner LeKukie saved three frames over averge11 with a time of 4:54.365. LeKukie, who had been playing since 2019, had been held back by inferior hardware, first running on a PlayStation 2 via emulation and then on a Brazilian NES which runs slightly slower than the North American model. Various members of the Super Mario Bros. speedrunning community donated equipment to allow him to play at the top level.

External videos
- Current world record run by Niftski

On August 13, 2026, Niftski reclaimed the record, pushing it to 4:54.332, four frames from a theoretically perfect run. On October 31, Niftski saved two more frames with two to go, obtaining a 4:54.299. As a Halloween celebration, Niftski was doing a Mario voice impression while wearing a Mario costume on his livestream. During the stream, Niftski said "hopefully I don’t get this today because that would be very stupid." After the run he credited the act with aiding the run by calming his nerves.

=== Input swapping dispute ===
While swapping the input method had been allowed by the rules since October 2025, a decision to ban the method was proposed in February of the following year and received the majority vote. Both averge11 and Niftski, who had been swapping between a computer keyboard and an NES controller in runs, were not part of the moderation team but were brought in as consultants on the vote. On March 30, 2026, Niftski released a video accusing averge11 of rigging the vote to sabotage his progress and claiming that the decision was done in bad faith. Niftski claimed that averge11 sent negative messages about him in private servers to motivate other members to conspire against him, while also pushing to close the vote early to avoid other members potentially voting against the rule change. Messages posted on averge11's private Discord server after the vote such as "no more Niftski" were also brought up. averge11 later responded on Twitter, stating that they didn't "have an excuse for some of the behavior brought up in some of these documents, nor [did they] intend to excuse it." After further community feedback, the decision was reversed in July 2026.

== Organization ==
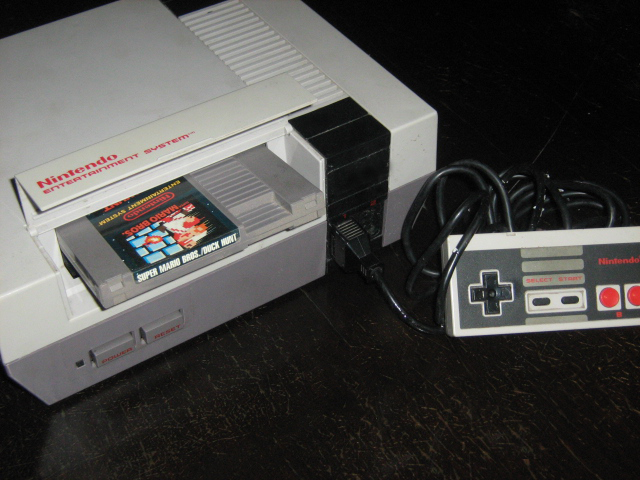
An original Nintendo Entertainment System with a Super Mario Bros. / Duck Hunt cartridge

Currently, no formal organization or company officiates Super Mario Bros. speedruns. Community decisions are managed by a team of volunteer moderators who verify runs submitted to Speedrun.com, vote on leaderboard rules, and moderate the community Discord server and Speedrun.com forums.

Speedruns can be performed on both official Nintendo consoles, such as the NES, or on a short list of approved emulators. Runners can choose to play on a variety of controllers including computer keyboards and are allowed to switch controllers in the middle of a run. Controllers are also restricted to not register simultaneous left and right inputs, which cannot be performed with an unmodified NES controller and are prohibited by the rules. Glitches are allowed, but cheat codes or other hardware modications not possible on official Nintendo hardware are banned. Timing begins once the player gains control of Mario and ends around the frame everything disappears after he touches the axe behind Bowser at the end of World 8-4.

== Performance ==
Speedrunners acquire new personal best times by recording speedruns known as "attempts" or "runs". If a runner decides that a run is not going well enough, they often end their runs early or "reset" to fit more attempts into a session. At the top level, it can often take thousands of attempts to acquire a new personal best. Top runners often stream their attempts live on Twitch. A common feature of these live streams is an on screen heart rate monitor. During successful attempts, top runner heart rates can reach higher than 160 beats per minute. World record holder Niftski reached a heart rate of 188 bpm at the end of one successful attempt.

Outside of attempts, speedrunners practice individual tricks and levels with the help of outside tools, such as save states and flashcarts.

== Categories ==
Super Mario Bros. speedrunners compete to achieve times in a number of different categories. Most categories still require the completion the game but may come with different rulesets or require additional game actions for completion.

=== Any% ===
The any% category is the shortest run that completes the game and also the most competitive. Glitches are allowed in this category. Two different warp zones hidden by the developers are used in this category to skip much of the game. Speedrunners only need to play through 8 of the 32 levels to reach the end. Since 2007, the world record has been improved by less than six seconds. The current world record is 4:54.299 held by Niftski.

=== Warpless ===
The warpless category bans the use of warp zones which allow the player to skip levels. Glitches including the walljump and flagpole glitch are still allowed. This category beats all 32 levels in the base game. The current world record is 18:49.972 held by Niftski.

=== Glitchless ===
The glitchless category bans the use of glitches but is otherwise identical to any%. Glitches banned include wall jumps, wall clips, wrong warps, the flagpole glitch, and the bullet bill glitch. The current world record is 5:02.685 by Niftski.

=== All-Stars ===
Speedruns are also performed on the Super Mario All-Stars version. This version has a number of relevant changes compared to the original, including Piranha Plants having larger hitboxes and enemies despawning less often. The current world record for All-Stars any% is 4:55.780 by Niftski, the warpless record is 19:42.885 also by Niftski.

=== Category extensions ===
On Speedrun.com, 40 categories are recognized on the category extensions leaderboard. These categories are not a part of the base game's main leaderboards. One of these categories is "OneHand", whereby the game must be completed as fast as possible with only one hand. The world record for this category is 4:56.911, held by LeKukie.

=== Tool-assisted ===
Super Mario Bros. is also a popular target for tool-assisted speedrunners, who use tools such as save states and frame advance to perform tasks that would otherwise be impossible for a human. Tool-assisted speedruns, abbreviated as TAS, are often used to identify the limits of human performance. The current world record TAS was submitted on January 6, 2011 by HappyLee and beats the game in 4:54.032. (Note: 4:57.31 (TAS timing)) (Note: Tool-assisted runs are often timed using TAS timing, which begins as soon as the console is turned on and ends when the last button press is performed.) The run exploits some techniques that require holding both left and right on the controller at the same time, something that is impossible to do on a normal NES controller. Without the use of these techniques, which are banned in real time speedruns, the fastest TAS, created by Maru370, beats the game in 4:54.265. This run, completed in 2019, saved exactly one frame (about 16.4 milliseconds) over the previous best tool-assisted run in that category. Tool-assisted speedruns have also been created for other categories. The fastest glitchless TAS completes the game in 5:02.485. (Note: 5:05.763 (TAS timing))

== Frame rules ==
The frame rule bus analogy, showing Mario arriving and departing every 0.349 seconds

The unique way in which level completion is handled has a large effect on the set of possible times achievable in a speedrun. While Super Mario Bros. runs at 60.0988139 frames per second, progression from one level to the next is tied to an internal counter that resets every 21 frames, meaning the level completion time will always be a multiple of 21 frames (0.349 seconds). Each 21 frame cycle is known as a frame rule. A popular analogy for frame rules compares them to a hypothetical bus that arrives at the end of the level every 21 frames, with the player having to wait for the bus if the level is finished before its arrival.

Because of the frame rule system, subtle differences in gameplay will typically not have any effect on the final completion time unless the level is completed very close to the end of a frame rule. Frame rules help to set a minimum possible time for each level. They also help control the game's randomness. A pseudorandom number generator generates a value each frame that determines the behavior of enemies. These values will always be the same if a speedrunner can match the frame rules of a previous run.

An exception to the frame rule system are lag frames, which delay the game by one frame (16.4 milliseconds) but otherwise leave gameplay unaffected. In at least one case, a runner has failed to achieve a new world record due to a single frame of lag.

The only level without frame rules is World 8-4, where touching the axe stops the timer immediately and marks the end of the speedrun. Subtle gameplay differences even by a frame affect the final time in this level.

== Techniques ==
=== Flagpole glitch ===
To complete a non-castle level without using warp zones, the player has to touch a flagpole at the end of the level, which starts a cutscene of Mario lowering the flag and walking into the castle. By carefully controlling Mario's movement with sub-pixel precision, the player can clip Mario inside the block the flagpole is placed on. Touching the flagpole in this position skips the flag lowering animation, letting Mario move into the castle right away. Each instance of the flagpole glitch generally saves one frame rule, or 0.35 seconds. The method of performing this technique used in real time runs was discovered by sockfolder. In the discovery of this method, sockfolder wrote a computer program to do a brute force search through Mario's potential movement options. This glitch played a large part in bringing any% speedruns below 4:57.

=== Bullet Bill glitch ===
A more advanced version of the flagpole glitch can be performed in World 8-2 by clipping into the flagpole block with a bounce off a Bullet Bill, which skips the animation of Mario walking to the castle. To perform this glitch more consistently, speedrunners begin each run by waiting on the title screen for a certain amount of time, starting the run on a specific frame rule. This controls enemy behavior and causes the Bullet Bill to leave its cannon as fast as possible. In 2016, the world record holder at the time, darbian, could only successfully perform the trick about 10% of the time. This glitch was first implemented in speedruns by Blubbler in 2014. A faster version was discovered by Kriller37 in 2020, which enabled Niftski to achieve his first world record.

=== Wrong warp ===
The destination of warp pipes and vines found throughout the levels is determined by a single value stored in the console's RAM. This value is updated as players progress in the level to allow vines and pipes to warp to the correct locations. By carefully controlling Mario's position on screen or by backtracking once the warp destination has been updated, speedrunners can cause a warp pipe to take them to an unintended location. This is known as a wrong warp. A significant use of this glitch is in World 4-2. It is also used in the "turnaround room" of World 8-4.

=== Wall jump ===
In Super Mario Bros., walls are made up of 16 × 16 pixel tiles. By jumping into a wall such that Mario's feet touch the boundary between one wall tile and the next, runners can stand inside the wall briefly. By jumping during this time, runners can get a second jump off the wall. This is used in World 8-4 to reach a floating pipe. The use of this glitch in runs was first pioneered by andrewg.

=== Fast acceleration ===
Runners can exploit the fact that Mario accelerates faster going backwards to reach his top speed quicker. Jumping backwards from a standstill is known as "fast acceleration" and a number of precise inputs are required to execute it. The technique is used in the fastest strategy in World 8-1 to save one frame rule. It can also be used in World 8-4 to save a few frames.

=== Arbitrary code execution ===
By accessing the Minus World on the Famicom Disk System version of Super Mario Bros., a version of arbitrary code execution can be performed. This glitch allow players to reprogram the game using only the inputs provided by a Famicom controller. Arbitrary code execution (ACE) was discovered by a team of runners lead by Kosmic. It was first theorized after a similar glitch was discovered in Super Mario Bros.: The Lost Levels. It currently does not save time in any speedrun and is too precise to be performed by humans, only being possible in a tool-assisted speedrun.

== Strategies ==
=== World 4-2 ===
In World 4-2, a wrong warp is used to save about five seconds. If Mario's position on screen is displaced by 20 pixels, speedrunners can get to the warp zone by descending down a pipe instead of climbing a set of vines, skipping a slow climbing animation. It was discovered by andrewg and first implemented in 2007. The wrong warp is performed by bumping into objects while travelling backwards, which causes Mario to move forward on the screen. Originally, three bumps were used to get the necessary displacement.

A version of the wrong warp using two bumps, a trick known as "fast 4-2", was eventually implemented, saving one frame rule. This version was much more difficult to execute, with darbian in 2016 estimating he could successfully perform the trick about 3% of the time. When flagpole glitch was discovered many runners abandoned "fast 4-2" in favor of more consistent strategies. Eventually, an alternative method of the trick was implemented that involved clipping into a wall.

The current fastest method of performing the World 4-2 wrong warp is a precise setup known as "Lightning 4-2", faster by one frame rule than all previous methods. "Lightning 4-2" was first theorized by HappyLee in 2018 but was considered to be too difficult to execute in runs. HappyLee's method involved jumping on a precise frame following a wall clip. KingOfJonnyBoy discovered a different method of executing the trick, which replaced the wall clip with a bump into a coin block and a wall jump up to the pipe. In 2021, Niftski attempted to use this method to execute the trick for the first time in a run. Two years later, this trick allowed Niftski to achieve a new Any% world record of 4:54.631, tying the best possible run up to the last level.

== Legacy ==
At a Nintendo World Store event celebrating the 25th anniversary of the release of Super Mario Bros, Andrew Gardikis was invited to speedrun it live in front of its lead designer, Shigeru Miyamoto. According to Miyamoto, Super Mario Bros. speedruns inspired the auto-running mechanic used in the 2016 mobile game Super Mario Run.

At Summer Games Done Quick 2018, a charity speedrunning marathon benefiting Médecins Sans Frontières (MSF), Kosmic and three other runners participated in a race of the warpless category. Kosmic also pledged to run the "OneHand" category as a bonus donation incentive. $2.12 million dollars were raised for MSF over the course of the event. $20,668 of that donation was raised towards Kosmic's one-handed speedrun incentive.

== Any% world record progression ==
Date	Time	Runner	Notes	Ref.
January 2004	5:14	Scott Kessler		
February 2004	5:11 (Note: 5:14 (Twin Galaxies timing))	Scott Kessler		
April 2004	5:10 (Note: 5:13 (Twin Galaxies timing))	Scott Kessler		
October 2004	5:07 (Note: 5:10 (Twin Galaxies timing))	Trevor Seguin		
November 2004	5:06 (Note: 5:09 (Twin Galaxies timing))	Trevor Seguin		
May 2005	5:05.846 (Note: 5:09 (Twin Galaxies timing). Considered to be tied world record at the time.)	andrewg		
October 2006	5:05.397 (Note: 5:08 (Twin Galaxies timing))	Scott Kessler		
April 10, 2007	5:00.355	andrewg	First run on SDA. Wrong warps and wall jump implemented.	
December 24, 2010	4:59.690	andrewg	First run under 5 minutes.	
December 15, 2011	4:58.874	andrewg		
January 15, 2013	4:58.791	andrewg		
January 19, 2013	4:58.575	andrewg		
March 21, 2013	4:58.525	andrewg		
May 19, 2013	4:58.359	andrewg		
July 1, 2013	4:58.159	andrewg	"fast 4-2" implemented.	
October 7, 2013	4:58.142	andrewg		
March 25, 2014	4:58.092	andrewg		
June 25, 2014	4:57.693	Blubbler	Bullet bill glitch implemented.	
October 18, 2015	4:57.627	darbian		
January 14, 2016	4:57.427	darbian	First record to implement both "fast 4-2" and the bullet bill glitch.	
April 14, 2016	4:57.260	darbian		
August 11, 2016	4:57.244	darbian		
October 4, 2016	4:57.194	Kosmic	Flagpole glitch in World 1-1 and 4-1 implemented.	
October 6, 2016	4:56.878	darbian		
October 20, 2017	4:56.528	darbian	Flagpole glitch in World 8-3 implemented.	
February 16, 2018	4:56.462	Kosmic	Wall clip in world 4-2 implemented.	
May 25, 2018	4:56.245	somewes		
September 25, 2018	4:55.913	Kosmic	Pipe clip in world 1-2 implemented and first run under 4:56.	
October 22, 2018	4:55.796	somewes		
August 2, 2019	4:55.746	tavenwebb2002		
January 17, 2020	4:55.646	Kosmic		
November 13, 2020	4:55.430	Niftski	Faster bullet bill glitch implemented.	
January 2, 2021	4:55.314	Miniland		
February 4, 2021	4:55.230	Miniland		
April 7, 2021	4:54.948	Niftski	Flagpole glitch in World 8-1 implemented and first run under 4:55.	
November 5, 2021	4:54.914	Miniland		
December 2, 2021	4:54.881	Niftski		
August 7, 2022	4:54.798	Niftski		
September 6, 2023	4:54.631	Niftski	"Lightning 4-2" implemented and first run to match the TAS up to 8-4.	
January 9, 2025	4:54.565	Niftski		
August 28, 2025	4:54.515	averge11		
October 9, 2025	4:54.482	Niftski		
October 23, 2025	4:54.448	Niftski		
December 18, 2025	4:54.415	averge11		
June 2, 2026	4:54.365	LeKukie		
August 13, 2026	4:54.332	Niftski		
October 31, 2026	4:54.299	Niftski	2 frames (0.033 seconds) off the theorized best possible time of 4:54.265.	
