= Kosmic =

American speedrunner (born 1995)

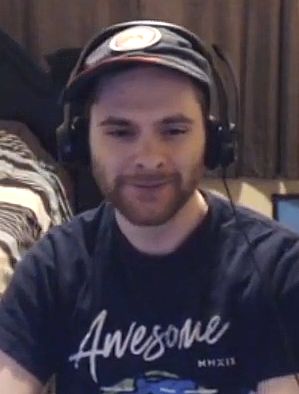
- Kosmic in 2021
- Born: June 12, 1995 (age 31)
- Other name: Kosmicd12
- Occupations: Livestreamer; speedrunner
- Known for: Super Mario Bros. speedrunning

Twitch information
- Channel: kosmic
- Followers: 68 thousand

YouTube information
- Channel: @Kosmicd12
- Years active: 2009–present
- Subscribers: 283 thousand
- Views: 66 million
- Last updated: April 14, 2026

Kosmic (born June 12, 1995), formerly Kosmicd12, is an American video game streamer, YouTuber and speedrunner. He was the first person to beat Super Mario Bros. in 4 minutes, 55 seconds, a time that was previously called impossible. Kosmic is considered one of the world's top Super Mario Bros. speedrunners. He is also known for his technical knowledge of Super Mario Bros. and other games, having helped discover various glitches and exploits.

== Life and career ==
Kosmic was born on June 12, 1995. He is a computer science student from the United States. Before Kosmic started speedrunning the game, Andrew Gardikis, known online as andrewg, was the world record holder.

=== Speedrunning ===
Kosmic starting speedrunning in 2011. He got his start by mimicking glitches and tricks he found on YouTube, before eventually streaming attempts live on Twitch. One of Kosmic's earliest runs of Super Mario Bros. streamed through SpeedRunsLive beat the game in an hour and ten minutes. Over the course of the next six years, Kosmic would steadily improve his personal best to below five minutes.

In 2016, the Any% world record for the game would go back and forth between Kosmic and American speedrunner Brad Myers, known online as darbian. darbian first got a time of 4:57.427, then 3 months later he got 4:57.260, which he beat by a frame 3 months later. In September 2016, Kosmic tied darbian's world record of 4:57.244, which he beat 4 days later with a 4:57.194. This record would only last 2 days before darbian took it back with a time of 4:56.878, the first ever 4:56.

In January 2018, Kosmic set another world record with a time of 4:56.462. In April, Kosmic set a world record for Super Mario Bros. in Super Mario All-Stars, beating it in 5:01.370. It was 360 milliseconds faster than andrewg run of 5:01.701 set in July 2017. In May 2018, Kosmic got the first sub-five minute run of Super Mario Bros. using just one hand.

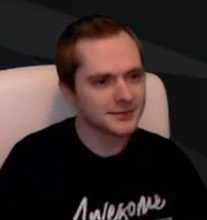
Kosmic was the first person to complete Super Mario Bros. in 4 minutes, 55 seconds (pictured in March 2019, 5 months after achieving his record).

On September 25, 2018, Kosmic became the first person to break the 4:56 barrier, achieving a time of 4:55.913. It was an achievement that had previously been called "impossible". Kosmic implemented a wall clip in World 1-2 to get to the warp zone faster. He completed the run on his ninth attempt after tying the world record of 4:56.245 held by somewes. In August 2019, Kosmic became the first person to beat Super Mario Bros. in under 19-minutes without using warp zones, with a final time of 18:59.806. Kosmic is considered one of the world's top Super Mario Bros. speedrunners. As of 2018, he had attempted over 30,000 speedruns of the game.

=== Other achievements ===
In February 2025, Kosmic managed to complete the 117th stage in Donkey Kong previously believed to be impossible due to an integer overflow glitch. In October 2025, Kosmic uncovered over 20 extraneous levels in the Super Mario All-Stars version of Super Mario Bros.: The Lost Levels, ranging from repeats of existing levels, similar to the Minus World in Super Mario Bros., to highly unstable levels that display extreme graphical corruption and could even crash the game. In March 2026, Kosmic released a YouTube video essay explaining how arbitrary code execution (ACE) was discovered in Super Mario Bros.: The Lost Levels, and later in the Famicom Disk System version of Super Mario Bros. Polygon named it the "biggest glitch in the game's 40-year history."

== See also ==
Other top Super Mario Bros. speedrunners:

- andrewg, a speedrunner who was the first player known to have beaten the game in under 5 minutes
- darbian, an American speedrunner known for setting the world record multiple times
- Niftski, an American speedrunner known for being the fastest person in history to ever complete the game
