= Niftski =

American speedrunner

- Niftski in 2026
- Born: United States
- Occupations: Livestreamer, speedrunner
- Years active: 2019–present
- Known for: Super Mario Bros. speedrunning world records

Twitch information
- Channel: Niftski
- Years active: 2019–present
- Game: Super Mario Bros.
- Followers: 37.4 thousand

YouTube information
- Channel: Niftski
- Years active: 2019–present
- Subscribers: 55.5 thousand
- Views: 10.9 million
- Last updated: November 2, 2026

Niftski is an American speedrunner and online streamer. He is a prominent speedrunner of Super Mario Bros. and the fastest person in history to ever complete it at 4 minutes, 54 seconds, and 299 milliseconds. He holds other world records for Super Mario Bros. (1985), including the record for all levels without using warps, and was the first person to beat it in less than 4 minutes and 55 seconds.

== Early and personal life ==
Niftski is from the United States. He started gaming when he was three years old, on PC, including Flash games. He started playing Super Mario Bros. around six years old.

== Speedrunning career ==
Niftski began speedrunning in 2019. He set his first world record in the any% category for Super Mario Bros. in 2020, with a time of 4:55.430, more than a fifth of a second improvement over Kosmic, the former world record holder. He set the record during a four-hour live stream. Justyna Janik notes the practice and study it would take to set this record.

In April 2021, Niftski reclaimed the record from fellow speedrunner Miniland. This time, he brought the time under 4:55, to 4:54.948, a feat that Kyle Orland of Ars Technica compared to the four-minute mile. The community called the milestone "historic". Orland writes that the video of the run is worth watching to hear Niftski's exclamations. Elizabeth Henges of Eurogamer also notes the emotion shown by Niftski upon reaching the milestone. After claiming this record, Niftski declared his goal to set world records in other categories, including minus world and blindfolded runs. In late 2021, Niftski reclaimed the world record, again from Miniland. He then improved upon it in August 2022, reducing the time by five more frames.

In January 2022, Niftski set a world record of 5:02:785 in the "glitchless" category of the same game on his first attempt. The category disallows the use of exploits. Two years later he would improve his record to 5:02:685. In September 2023, Niftski broke his own any% world record in the game again, lowering the time to 4:54.631. To make this time, he had to add a technique called "Lightning 4-2" to his run, which shaved fractions of a second off level 4-2 of the game. The technique was established by a speedrunner named HappyLee, who used emulation tools in what is known as a tool-assisted speedrun (TAS). Niftski himself updated that method, with the development of the method used in this run also aided by KingOfJonnyBoy. This record is the first time a human has achieved the best result with respect to "frame rules"; however, there was still time to save in 8-4, the game's final stage.

Orland describes Niftski's video showing a heart rate of 188 BPM, and his tearful reaction following the run, telling himself to "Get oxygen, dude". Dustin Bailey of GamesRadar+ describes Niftski's reaction at the end of the run as "a genuine all-timer that really helps sell the significance of the accomplishment." During early October 2023, Niftski became the fourth person in the world to hold all Super Mario Bros. main category speedrun records simultaneously, joining AndrewG, darbian, and Kosmic.

In January 2025, 490 days after his previous record, Niftski again lowered the Super Mario Bros. record, this time to 4:54.565, marking an improvement of four frames. This run is 18 frames off a perfect human run. He concurrently held records in several other categories including Glitchless, Warpless All-Stars, Warpless, Any% All-Stars, and Minus World Ending. In August 2025, the any% world record in Super Mario Bros. was taken from Niftski for the first time in four years by averge11 with a time of 4:54.515, lowering the record by three frames.

On October 8, 2025, Niftski exactly tied averge11's world record of 4:54.515, on his second attempt of the day, and first past the flagpole glitch in 1-1. Later the same day, Niftski claimed back the world record, with a time of 4:54.482. On October 22, 2025, Niftski beat the World Record again with a time of 4:54.448, a record that was held until December 18, 2025, when it was surpassed by averge11 with a time of 4:54:415. However Niftski reclaimed the record with a time of 4:54:332 on August 13, 2026, leaving only four frames between his record and matching the perfect tool-assisted speedrun. Niftski has also held world records in Super Mario Bros.: The Lost Levels (1986) and various other games, and speedruns ROM hacks.

On October 31, 2026, Niftski set a new world record of 4:54.299, becoming the first player to achieve a sub-4:54.3 time, which is expected to be the last "tenth of a second" barrier for Super Mario Bros. speedrunning. The record was set during a Halloween-themed broadcast and he was dressed as Mario.

== Equipment and publication ==
Niftski usually plays with a keyboard on an approved emulator called Nestopia UE rather than a gamepad, emulated on PC. Nevertheless, he has held the world record on the original hardware using a gamepad with a time of 4:54.814, beating the previous record held by Tree_05 by three frames. Niftski live streams his runs on Twitch, and publishes on YouTube.

While Niftski uses a computer keyboard as the primary input method, he occasionally swaps to an NES controller for specific tricks that are easier to perform with it. While input swapping had been allowed since a vote in October 2025, another vote was held in February 2026, where the technique was banned. On March 30, 2026, Niftski released a video accusing another speedrunner of colluding with moderators to rig the vote against input swapping to slow down his progress after he had found success using the technique. He said that the other speedrunner had spread negative messages about him to influence others and pushed the vote to end early, before some members could make their votes. The other speedrunner would later respond, stating "I don't have an excuse for some of the behavior brought up ... nor do I intend to excuse it." After further community feedback, the ban was reversed in July 2026.
