= Darbian =

American speedrunner and video game streamer

darbian
- Born: Brad Myers; October 19, 1986 (age 40)

Twitch information
- Channel: darbian

YouTube information
- Channel: darbian
- Years active: 2013-2018; 2020-2022
- Genres: Gaming, speedrunning
- Subscribers: 108 thousand

Brad Myers (born October 19, 1986), better known as darbian, is an American speedrunner and video game streamer, best known for setting the world record for fastest time in Super Mario Bros. (1985) multiple times.

== Speedrunning career ==
Myers' interest in speedrunning began in 2013, after watching AGDQ. He first speedran Super Mario Bros. as part of a SpeedRunsLive contest. After initially getting started with speedrunning and streaming in 2013, Myers joined speedrun.com on September 3, 2014, and began speedrunning Super Mario Bros. with higher frequency.

In October 2015, Myers set the world record with at time of 4:57.627 using original Nintendo Entertainment System hardware. He cut 66 milliseconds from the previous record, set the prior year by Blubbler.

In early 2016, Myers published a two-hour video tutorial for beginners on the Super Mario Bros. Any% record to YouTube.

Over the course of the year, he would improve upon his record. While lowering his record, Myers was the first human to incorporate the "flagpole glitch" technique into the speedrun, once thought to be a TAS-only possibility.

Later in 2016, Myers reclaimed the record from Kosmic who had held it for two days, with a time of 4:56.878. He was the first to beat the game in less than four minutes and 57 seconds. At that time, in his career he had attempted almost 22,000 speedruns of the game. He simultaneously held the record for the "warpless" category in Super Mario Bros.

In 2017, Myers set a world record in a different game, Super Mario Bros.: The Lost Levels (1986) in the "warpless" category. Describing his ongoing streaming during his grind for the record, Allegra Frank of Polygon refers to Myers as "one of speedrunning's most engaging figures."

In 2018, during the recurring "12-Hour Challenge" speedrunning event, Myers learned and attempted to speedrun 18 holes of Wii Sports Resort (2009) Golf. He broke the record, his new time standing for a week. According to Alex McCumbers of Twin Galaxies, Myers's streaming popularity led to big increase in the number of people attempting the category.

== Personal life ==
As of 2016, Myers lived in Virginia.

== See also ==
- Andrew Gardikis, another Super Mario Bros. speedrunner
- Niftski, another Super Mario Bros. speedrunner
