= Pokémon Center =

Japanese mono-brand retail chain

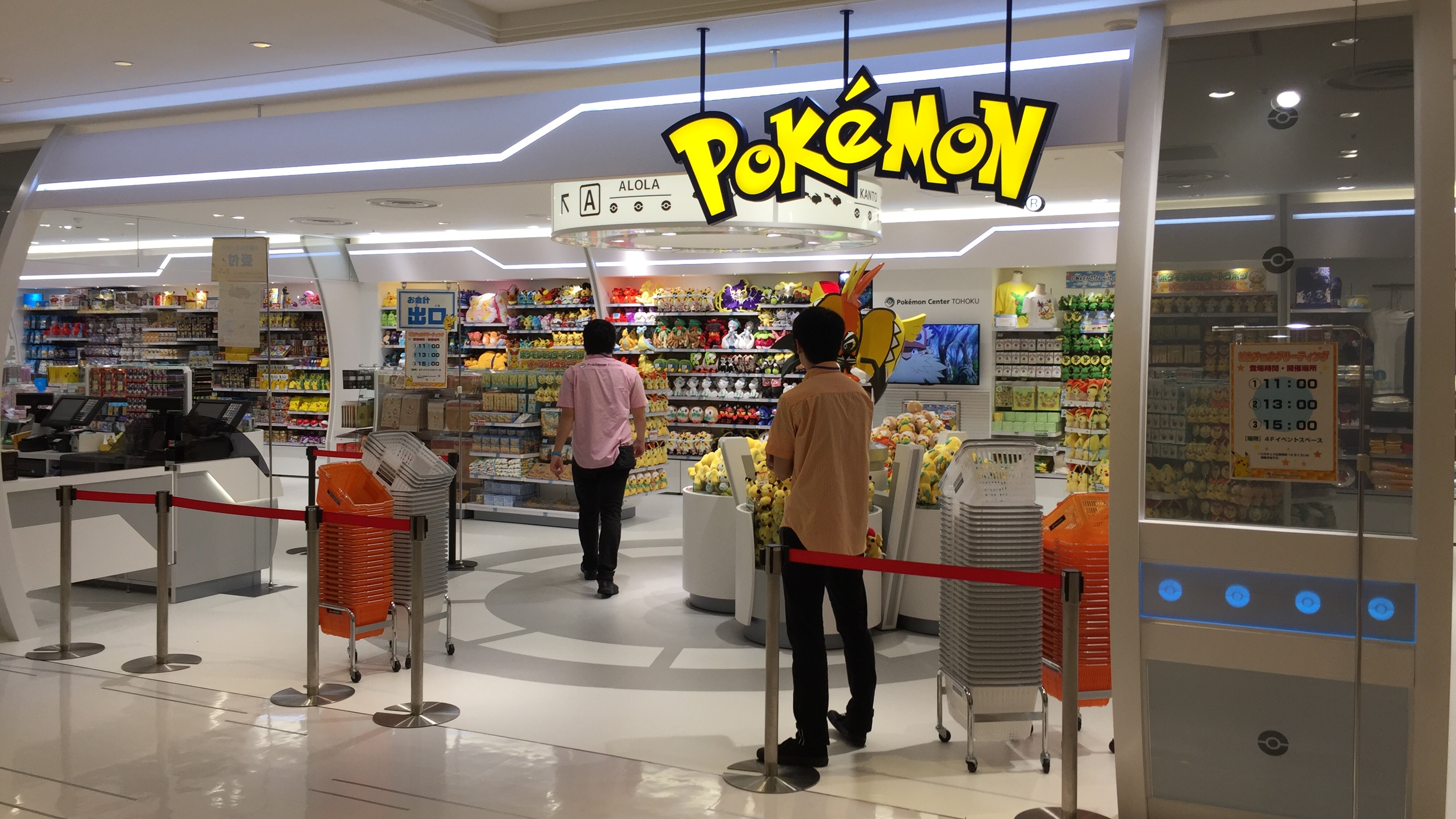
Pokémon Center in Sendai

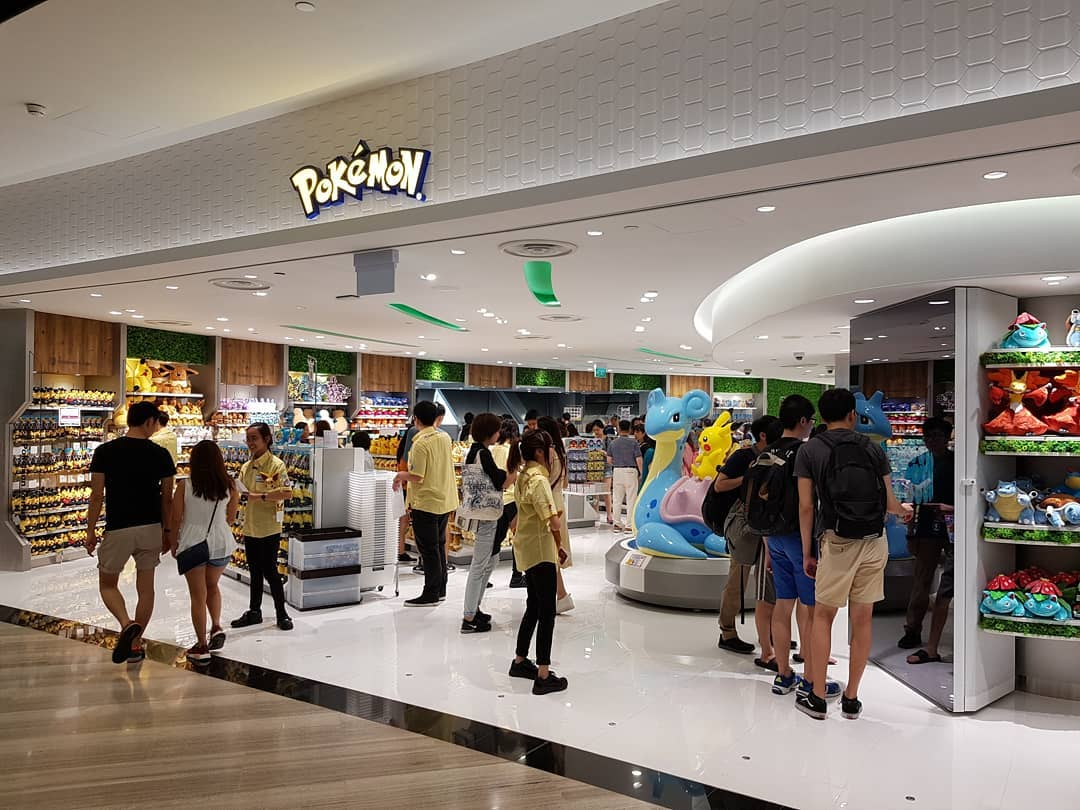
Former appearance of the Pokémon Center in Singapore; the store has since been renovated

The Pokémon Center is a chain of specialty stores selling Pokémon-related merchandise. Pokémon Centers are predominantly located in Japan, the first having opened in Tokyo in 1998. Stores have also opened in Singapore, the United States, and Taiwan. As of 2026, there are 25 active stores with two located outside Japan.

Within the Pokémon universe, "Pokémon Centers" are locations where characters can heal, manage, and trade their Pokémon creatures. Real Pokémon Centers, named after the fictional counterparts, sell merchandise such as action figures, plush toys, cereal boxes, clothing, backpacks, and badges.

== History ==
The Pokémon Company opened the first Pokémon Center store in Tokyo in April 1998. This original Pokémon Center eventually closed and reopened in a different location. Pokémon Center Osaka, one of the franchise' bigger locations at 830 square meters, was the country's seventh Pokémon Center and opened in 2010.

On November 16, 2001, Nintendo opened a store called the Pokémon Center in Rockefeller Center, New York City. The Pokémon Center was closed and replaced by the Nintendo World Store in 2005. This store was renovated and rebranded to Nintendo New York in 2016.

Only one Pokémon Center out of 15, along with three smaller locations, remained open at the height of the COVID-19 pandemic in Japan, and the location in Okayama closed permanently. There are over 20 Pokémon Center locations in Japan as of 2023.

On December 8, 2023, the second permanent Pokémon Center outside of Japan opened in Taipei at the Shin Kong Mitsukoshi department store near Taipei 101. The Pokémon Company International launched an online Pokémon Center store in 2014.

== Locations ==
As of 2026, there are 23 Pokémon locations in Japan, including five labelled "Pokémon Store". They include ten locations in the Greater Tokyo Area. These exclude temporary pop-up stores, for example: one such store operated in London during the Pokémon World Championships in 2022, and another operated for three weeks in June 2014 at the Cremerie de Paris, near the Louvre in Paris.

=== Outside Japan ===
- Singapore: Opened on 17 April 2019 at Jewel Changi Airport. Underwent renovation from April 1 to July 1 2026, when it reopened.
- Taipei, Taiwan: Opened on 8 December 2023 in the Xinyi District.
- Bangkok, Thailand: Expected to open on 1 December 2026 at CentralWorld Bangkok.

=== Former stores ===
- New York City: Open from 2001 to 2005, converted to Nintendo New York.
