= Andrew Gardikis =

American speedrunner

AndrewG
- Born: Andrew Gardikis; January 22, 1990 (age 36)

Twitch information
- Channels: AndrewG
- Followers: 21.8 thousand

YouTube information
- Channels: andrewg1990; AndrewgSpeedruns
- Genre: Speedrunning
- Subscribers: 9.70 thousand (andrewg1990); 2.46 thousand (AndrewgSpeedruns)

Andrew Gardikis (born January 22, 1990), better known as AndrewG, is a speedrunner who was the first player known to have beaten Super Mario Bros. (1985) in under 5 minutes. He has been a part of the Super Mario Bros. speedrunning community for over 20 years.

== Speedrunning career ==
Prior to speedrunning, Gardikis was a runner, but he had to stop due to lung issues.

In 2004, as a 14 year old, Gardikis had set a goal to beat the game as fast as possible after watching a speedrun on G4TV. He played on the Nintendo Entertainment System his older sister had bought in the early 1990s.

Gardikis uploaded a VHS recording of his first world record of 5:05 to YouTube on March 23, 2006. In 2011, he uploaded a video of him beating the game in 4 minutes and 59 seconds, breaking the 5 minute barrier for the first time. Gardikis held the record for seven years, his tenure itself a record. Over nine years of speedrunning, he improved his time by seven seconds.

Due to his success in speedrunning Super Mario Bros., he was invited to meet with Shigeru Miyamoto. Miyamoto watched him play live at the Nintendo World Store during the game's 25th anniversary celebration. At the event, Gardikis played on the Wii Virtual Console while wearing a Super Mario Bros. 2 (1988) shirt.

Gardikis was a member of Team Ludendi, a team of speedrunners.

Gardikis has also held other records, including for Track & Field (1983), and Super Mario Bros 2.

== Legacy ==
According to Oliver Roeder of FiveThirtyEight, Gardikis is credited with pioneering or perfecting certain techniques of the Super Mario Bros. speedrun, including level 8-4's wall jump and level 4-2's wrong warp.

While holding the record in 2016, speedrunner darbian recalled Gardikis' dominance, also remembering a time he had juggled while playing with his feet.

== See also ==
- Kosmic, another Super Mario Bros. speedrunner
- Niftski, another Super Mario Bros. speedrunner
