= Tutorial (video games) =

Video game section

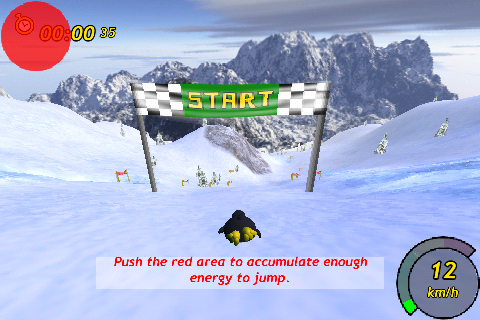
Tutorial level of the 2000 video game Tux Racer, telling the user to push the red area of the screen to jump

In the context of video game design, a tutorial is any tool that teaches player or non-player characters the rules, control interface, and mechanics of the game. Some tutorials are integrated into the game, while others are completely separate and optional. Games can have both of these at once, offering a basic mandatory tutorial and optional advanced training. Tutorials have become increasingly common due to the decline of printed video game manuals as a result of cost cutting and digital distribution. Tutorials can be important since they are a player's first impression of a game, and an overly tedious tutorial or one that does not allow for player freedom can negatively affect their view of a game. However, the lack of a tutorial can also harm a game by causing the player to become frustrated, since they cannot figure out essential game mechanics.

== Design ==
Tutorials range from gently easing the player into the experience, to forcing them to learn via trial and error, only allowing them to proceed when they have mastered the game-play. The former type is often framed as guidance from a mentor character, such as a wise old man or elderly master, and sometimes even literally depicts the main character growing from a child into an adult as they learn their skills, as in Horizon Zero Dawn. The latter type of tutorial presents the player with increasingly difficult enemies that demonstrate techniques required to overcome them. Other types of tutorials include slowly giving players information over the course of the entire game, as in the Legend of Zelda series.

Game designers have also pointed out ways in which a game can be designed with tutorial elements without being obvious. In the original Super Mario Bros., World 1-1 is designed so that when the player jumps over the first enemy, they are likely to accidentally hit a question mark block, which teaches the player where power-ups come from. The first level in the original Half-Life is often considered a tutorial in disguise. It has since become common to think of the first level of a game as a tutorial, whether or not they explicitly give players instructions. In essence, an easy level can act as a tutorial. In strategy games like Age of Empires, an entire single player campaign can be seen as a tutorial to prepare a player for multiplayer battle.

Game designers have been critical of tutorial levels and recommend providing instructions during ordinary gameplay. Playtesting usually helps define what instructions a player needs as they begin a game. A common tutorial design is to provide instructions where a mechanic might be used, such as when the player gains a new item or ability. In several The Legend of Zelda games, the player has a fairy companion who provides tutorials and hints at key moments. In games like Stellaris, tutorials take the form of elaborate tooltips, as well as occasional quests to nudge the player towards helpful actions. Tutorials can also be achieved by giving the player natural cues with intelligent use of graphic design. Some Star Wars games have re-appropriated film dialog as in-game hints about what the player needs to do. Games have also increasingly made use of video tutorials and wikis for players to review on their own time.

Other games have broken the fourth wall with their tutorials, using them as a source of comedy or parody. Examples include Far Cry 3: Blood Dragon, in which the main character demonstrates his annoyance at being forced to undergo a tutorial. Another example is in Undertale in which the tutorial character Toriel is named after tutorials and is shown to be literally holding the protagonist's hand the way a tutorial would.

== Tutorials vs. discoverability ==
Some critics argue that an effective tutorial should allow players to discover game mechanics organically rather than through explicit instruction. This approach is exemplified by the original Metroid and Minecraft. Although Minecraft generally favors discovery, its Legacy Console Edition features optional "Tutorial Worlds", that provide a more traditional instructional experience, with content that varies depending on the game version.
