= Super Mario Bros. theme =

Music theme from a video game

- Screenshot of World 1-1, the first appearance of the theme

Instrumental by Koji Kondo
- Released: September 13, 1985
- Genre: Chiptune; video game music
- Length: 1:22
- Label: Nintendo
- Composer: Koji Kondo

Audio sample
- The first three bars of the theme in its original appearance from Super Mario Bros. (1985): file; help

The Super Mario Bros. theme song, officially known as the "Ground Theme" or "Ground BGM", (Note: Japanese: 地上BGM, Hepburn: Chijō BGM) is a musical theme originally heard in World 1-1, the first stage of the 1985 Nintendo Entertainment System (NES) video game Super Mario Bros. It was one of six themes composed for the game by Nintendo sound designer Koji Kondo, who found it to be the most difficult track to compose for it.

The theme is set in the key of C major with a tempo of 100 beats per minute and features a swing rhythm with prominent use of syncopation. While the original theme is composed within the sound limitations of the NES's 8-bit hardware, in later installments with more powerful sound hardware, it is often scored as a calypso song led by steel drums. It went on to become the theme of the series, and has been a fixture in most of its titles. It has been reused and remixed in other Nintendo-published games. The theme was included in the American National Recording Registry in 2023 for its cultural significance, becoming the first piece of music from a video game to do so.

== Composition ==
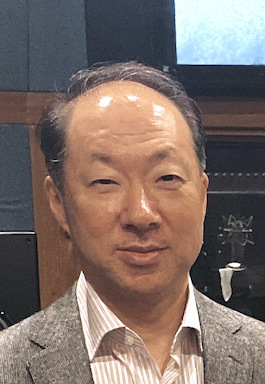
Koji Kondo, the theme's composer

Of the six tracks of the Super Mario Bros. soundtrack, this theme took the most time to develop, according to its composer Koji Kondo. He stated that he would write one piece, and the team would put it in the game. If it did not accentuate the action, did not time up with Mario running and jumping, or did not harmonize with the sound effects well enough, he would scrap it. He composed the music using only a small keyboard.

The composition takes influence from the 1984 song "Sister Marian" by the Square (later known as T-Square), a Japanese fusion band. In a 2001 interview by Game Maestro Vol. 3, Kondo affirms that "the overworld theme in Mario might show some influence from the Japanese fusion band T-Square, too. The rhythms in their music were easy for Japanese listeners to follow." The first theme he made for Super Mario Bros. was based on an early prototype of the game, which simply showed Mario running around a big empty area. Kondo described this early theme as a bit lazier, slower tempo, and more laid back. As the game underwent changes, he realized that his theme no longer fit, so he increased the pace and changed it around to fit better. In an interview, Kondo explained that compositional ideas come to him during everyday activities.

Kondo was given complete creative freedom over the soundtrack of Super Mario Bros., and would collaborate with Shigeru Miyamoto, the game's director, through their daily interactions. Miyamoto would share his records and music scores of the type of themes he liked with Kondo, but did not tell him exactly what he wanted. It was composed with a Latin rhythm. When the player has less than 100 units of time left to complete the stage, the music's tempo accelerates. At the Game Developers Conference in 2007, Kondo commented that the theme features rhythm, balance, and interactivity. He demonstrated this with a short clip of Super Mario Bros., showing the character's movements and players' button presses syncing with the beat of the music. He also added that the theme reflects the action-oriented gameplay of the series. Kondo stated that he was not sure if he could make any future music of his "catchier" than it.

== In other media ==
The theme was reused in multiple other media, including the anime film Super Mario Bros.: The Great Mission to Rescue Princess Peach!, The Super Mario Bros. Super Show! television series and The Super Mario Bros. Movie.

=== Lyrics ===
Japanese lyrics were originally submitted in 1985 by fans of the Japanese radio program Takao Komine All Night Nippon. The recorded version of the song with lyrics was released in 1986 under the name "Go Go Mario!!". The song is interpreted by Princess Peach, voiced by Hiroko Taniyama. The song was also released on vinyl, called Mario No Daibouken (transl. "Mario's Big Adventure").

For the 1989 animated television series The Super Mario Bros. Super Show!, a different, unrelated set of lyrics were penned for the song's appearance as the show's credits theme. Titled "Do the Mario", the song features the title character (portrayed by professional wrestler Lou Albano) vaguely instructing and encouraging the viewer in performing the eponymous dance.

=== Performances ===
The song was first performed live on All Night Nippon in 1986. The theme has been featured in many concerts, including "PLAY! Chicago", the Columbus Symphony, the Mario & Zelda Big Band Live, Play! A Video Game Symphony, and others. The Video Games Live concert featured the theme performed by Kondo. The song has been performed twice with The Roots on The Tonight Show Starring Jimmy Fallon, once in 2016 as a guitar performance with Mario series creator Shigeru Miyamoto, and once in 2023 as an acapella cover along with other themes from the game with the cast of The Super Mario Bros. Movie, Shigeru Miyamoto and Illumination CEO Chris Meledandri.

=== Sheet music ===
Notation of the theme's first three bars, which have become well known

For decades, Nintendo had not published official sheet music for Kondo's compositions. In 2011, Alfred Music published three officially licensed music folios of the music from Super Mario Bros. for piano and guitar. These were followed in 2013 by three more folios for New Super Mario Bros. Wii, and a folio of jazz styled arrangements of Super Mario Bros. themes.

== Reception ==
In an article about Kondo, Wired.com editor Chris Kohler described the theme as one of the most famous in the world, and that "it gets into your head quickly and won't leave". Jeremy Parish of 1UP.com called it one of the most memorable tracks in video game history. Editors Jeff Dickerson and Luke Smith of The Michigan Daily newspaper commented that if you were to ask a random student to hum the theme, they would likely know every note. Sam Kennedy, also an editor for 1UP.com, stated that anyone who lived through the '80s can hum the theme, and that most people remember it to this day.

Video game music composer Tommy Tallarico cited Kondo as his inspiration for why he got into music, commenting that when he first heard this theme, it was the first time he thought music in video games really existed. Mario voice actor Charles Martinet commented that "The first time I ever played a Mario game, I started at about 4 in the evening and played until daylight. I laid down on the bed, closed my eyes, and I could hear that music – ba dum bum ba dum DUM!" Former Final Fantasy series composer Nobuo Uematsu called Kondo one of the best video game composers in the industry, commenting that he was sure everyone in the world who has come across the Super Mario Bros. theme, regardless of borderlines or age, will never forget it, while also adding that it should become the new national anthem of Japan. In an interview with Kondo, 1UP.com editor Sam Kennedy stated that Paul and Linda McCartney visited Kondo in Japan and enjoyed the theme.

The ringtone version of the theme has proven very popular in the United States, having been on the top ten most downloaded ringtones for 112 straight weeks as of November 2004. Approximately 747,900 copies were sold in the United States in 2006 and the ringtone was awarded Gold certification in 2010.

In 2023, the Super Mario Bros. theme was selected by the U.S. Library of Congress for preservation in the National Recording Registry in 2023 based on its "cultural, historical or aesthetic importance in the nation's recorded sound heritage." The theme was the first recording from a video game ever selected for preservation in the registry.
