= World 1-1 =

Video game level

- Screenshot from the start of the level, showing Mario jumping up and a Goomba on the ground
- First appearance: Super Mario Bros. (1985)
- Created by: Shigeru Miyamoto
- Genre: Platform

In-universe information
- Type: Overworld
- Location: Mushroom Kingdom
- Characters: Mario or Luigi, Koopa Troopa, Goomba

World 1-1 is the first level of Super Mario Bros., Nintendo's 1985 platform game for the Nintendo Entertainment System. The level was designed by Shigeru Miyamoto to be a tutorial for new players, orienting them to platform jumping and to the rest of the game. It is considered one of the most famous and iconic levels in video game history and has been widely imitated, referenced, and parodied.

== Design ==
=== Philosophy ===
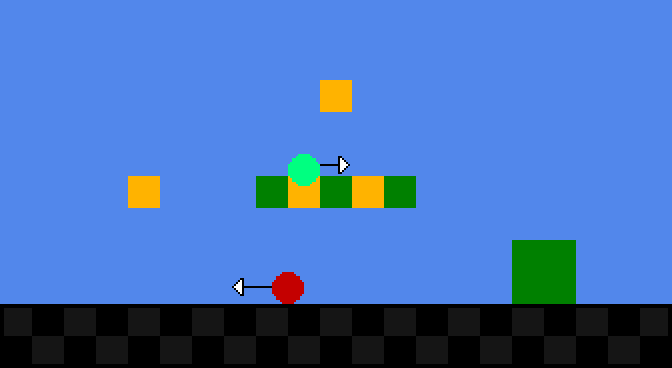
This schematic shows the start of World 1-1. The Goomba (red) walks toward Mario and must be jumped over. The Mushroom (light green) appears after bumping into the golden block from below, and initially rolls to the right, until it falls off the platform and bounces against the pipe (green). The Mushroom then turns around and rolls toward Mario, who can easily receive it at this point.

During the third generation of video game consoles, tutorials on video game mechanics were rare, so players were oriented to a new video game by its level design. The opening sections of Nintendo Entertainment System games such as Metroid, The Legend of Zelda, and Super Mario Bros. are all designed to force players to explore the game mechanics to be able to advance.

Super Mario Bros. is the first side-scrolling video game featuring Mario, and one of the first video games directed and designed by Shigeru Miyamoto. Rather than confront the player with obstacles indiscriminately, its first level introduces the variety of hazards and objects by directing the player to interact with them while advancing.

Miyamoto explained that he designed World 1-1 to contain everything players need to "gradually and naturally understand what they're doing", to be able to play more freely, so that it becomes "their game".

=== Execution ===
At the start of World 1-1, the player controls Mario to immediately encounter a slowly approaching Goomba. According to 1UP.com, it is likely that this first enemy will kill a novice player, even though the enemy can easily be avoided by jumping over it. As very little progress is lost, the player learns from defeat and can try again. Past this Goomba comes an arrangement of blocks, a few of which are colored in gold. Bumping one of them from below releases a coin. According to Miyamoto, seeing a coin come out will "make [the player] happy" and want to repeat the action. Doing so for the second gold-colored block makes a Mushroom come out as a surprise power-up. The player has learned from the Goomba that mushroom-shaped beings are bad, so perhaps the player tries to avoid the power-up Mushroom, but the corridor of blocks foils escape. Touching the Mushroom makes Mario grow in size and strength, another positive reinforcement.

Next comes a series of four vertical warp pipe obstacles that must be jumped over. Each has a different height, subtly teaching the player that holding the jump button longer makes a higher jump. When encountering variously-sized pits, the player may discover how to use the button for running, because running allows for bigger jumps across the pits. Furthermore, Miyamoto ensured that some pits in World 1-1 have floors and can be simply jumped out of, instead of killing Mario and forcing a replay of the entire level.

World 1-1 includes a few secrets that players can discover by replaying, such as a pipe leading to a bonus room and a hidden block containing a 1-up. The pipe also skips much of the level, to expedite the experienced players.

== Reception ==
World 1-1 has been cited as one of the most iconic video game levels, described by Chris Kerr of Gamasutra as "legendary". Boston Blake of Game Rant rated it among the best opening levels in video games for having "ignited a love for gaming in the hearts of gamers around the world", and Jon Irwin of Paste magazine described it as a "master-class in teaching players how to play".

Jeremy Parish of 1UP.com stated that "much of the game's success arose from the fact that it equipped players with the tools to master it from the very beginning." Almost all mechanics introduced throughout the game are based on those in World 1-1, and the first levels of Mario sequels (such as Super Mario Bros. 3) expand them further. He described it as "the most widely imitated, referenced, and parodied single level of a video game". Regarding the Super Mario Bros. theme, he called World 1-1 an "elegant fusion of sound, music, and action".

=== Legacy ===
The design philosophy introduced in Super Mario Bros., described as "learning through play", has been implemented in all of Miyamoto's later games. World 1-1 greatly influenced later Super Mario games, such as Super Mario 3D World's first level.

Variations of World 1-1 are frequently recreated as user-generated content, such as with Super Mario Maker and its sequel. Examples include an extra difficult version with dozens of twirling fire bars, a vertical climbing version, and a self-playing version. The stage has also been referenced numerous times in official media.

A Brooklyn construction site in the 2023 film The Super Mario Bros. Movie resembles the layout of World 1-1. A mission in Nintendo Switch 2 Welcome Tour involves the player completing several objectives in a recreated 4K version of World 1-1 that fits the entire level in a single screen.

== See also ==
- Super Mario Bros. theme
- Green Hill Zone
