= Minus World =

Glitched level in Super Mario Bros.

- Mario location
- The "Minus World" in the NES version
- First appearance: Super Mario Bros. (1985)
- Genre: Platform

In-universe information
- Type: Glitched world

The Minus World (Japanese: マイナスワールド) is an extraneous level created by a glitch found in the 1985 video game Super Mario Bros. It can be encountered by maneuvering the player character, Mario or Luigi, in such a way as to trigger an oversight in the game's level transition system. Players who enter this area are greeted with an endless, looping water level in the original Nintendo Entertainment System cartridge version, while the version released for the Famicom Disk System sends them to a sequence of three different levels; this difference is due to the data being arranged in different ways between the two versions. It gained exposure in part thanks to the magazine Nintendo Power discussing how the glitch is encountered. Super Mario Bros. creator Shigeru Miyamoto denied that the addition of the Minus World was intentional, though he later commented that the fact that it does not crash the game could make it count as a game feature.

The existence and revelation of this glitch led to rumors being spread about further secrets existing in Super Mario Bros. It is recognized as one of the greatest secrets and glitches in video game history, with the term "Minus World" coming to refer to areas in games that exist outside of normal parameters, such as in The Legend of Zelda. Frog Fractions designer Jim Stormdancer cited it as inspiration for making Frog Fractions the way he did, while Spelunky creator Derek Yu talked about his nostalgia for Minus World, lamenting a lack of mystique in modern games. References to the Minus World can be found in both Super Paper Mario and Super Meat Boy.

== Summary ==
The Minus World is accessed from World 1–2. In order to encounter it, players must exploit a glitch in order to maneuver Mario through the bricks separating the normal exit from the Warp Zone area. So long as players do not lock the screen in position, they can make Mario enter the first Warp Pipe before the text is revealed. However, if the glitch is performed carefully, players can make it to the other pipes. The second pipe will lead to world 5, while the third will also lead to the Minus World.

The console did not have a method to check for collisions between tiles, and the task of checking all points around a tile for possible collision points was too difficult for the console's Ricoh 2A03. To compensate for this, the designers put boundary boxes around objects and compared a limited number of collision boundaries. Mario's sprite has two points, one on each foot, each detecting his collision with the floor. The game would normally eject Mario in the opposite direction he is going if he is considered inside a block, which can be averted by crouching while jumping into it and, at the exact right moment, pushing left, causing him to be ejected on the other side of the wall. The game then erroneously sets the far-left and far-right Warp Pipes to send him to World -1.

When players successfully pull this off, they are presented with a screen reading World -1, and then Mario is put in a water level that loops the end with the beginning, and as a result, cannot be beaten. It is a copy of the stage World 7-2, aside from the looping. Despite the appearance and the popular name "Minus World", it is not, in fact, a negative level number. Rather, the level is identified in the internal memory as "World 36-1", but when it is displayed a blank tile is shown, as 36 is the tile number for a blank space. The reason the glitch occurs is because of a misread byte.

== Famicom Disk System version ==
The Famicom Disk System (FDS) version of the game only released in Japan has a different result from performing the glitch; instead of looping after Mario reaches the end of the level, it goes through three different levels until players reach the goal and the game ending. The first FDS Minus World level starts with an underwater level as well, with floating Princess Peach and Bowser sprites at multiple points. The second level is a copy of World 2–3. The third is an underground level with an axe at the end, like the fourth level of each world. The reason why the two versions' Minus Worlds differ is due to the FDS version using a floppy disk as opposed to the ROM cartridge used by the original Japanese and American versions. Cartridges and disks store data in different ways, resulting in the different versions sending the offset the Warp Pipe receives arriving at a different byte in the programming.

== Other glitched worlds ==
There are 256 total worlds recognized in-game, with 9 of them being accessible - the regular 8 worlds and the Minus World. The remaining worlds can be accessed via hot swapping cartridges or by using memory modifiers such as Game Genie. The common hot swapping method involves swapping cartridges with Tennis, but it can also be performed by using Family BASIC and typing a small program.

10 FOR I=&H7D3 TO &H7DC:POKE I,0:NEXT
20 POKE &H7FF,&HA5
30 INPUT "WORLD=";A
40 POKE &H7FD,A+255AND255

Just like the Minus World, the 247 inaccessible worlds are extraneous and can result in glitches, softlocks and crashes.

== History ==
When Super Mario Bros. creator Shigeru Miyamoto was asked about the Minus World, he denied authorship and said that it was not intended. When asked later about the Minus World, Miyamoto commented that while it was a glitch, the fact that it does not crash the game makes it a feature as well. Since its discovery, the Minus World has resulted in people believing that Super Mario Bros. designers hid secret levels for skilled players to find. It was featured in the third issue of Nintendo Power, describing it as "an endless water world from which no one has ever escaped." This appearance provided photographic evidence of the glitch.

== Reception ==
The Minus World was an "incredible phenomenon" and has become well-known over time according to Screen Rant, becoming a part of the video game design lexicon. Siliconera staff called it "legendary," while Game Informer writer Ian Boudreau called it "one of gaming's most famous glitches." Kotaku writer Jason Schreier wrote that it was "seared into video game history." Nintendo Life writer Gavin Lane called it "one of the most famous" of Nintendo's glitches. Edge staff discussed how its impact was "purely symbolic and contextual," discussing it as the glitch with the most "lasting influence." They felt that it was so appealing because it was relatively easy to accomplish, suggesting that its early popularity influenced the trend of secret levels. Both Screen Rant and GamesRadar+ made note of the fact that it is an infinite water level, with Screen Rant calling it "every gamer's worst nightmare." GamesRadar+ Justin Towell called it "one of the greatest" video game secrets. According to a game play counselor for Nintendo, the Minus World was one of the most often-requested tricks by callers.

== Legacy ==
The term 'Minus World' has become a term to refer to an area outside of the parameters of the game, with The Escapist identifying the Super Mario Bros. instance as "one of the first and most classic" examples. Glitches in other games have been referred to as a Minus World, including the first The Legend of Zelda. Frog Fractions and Frog Fractions 2 designer Jim Stormdancer cited moments like the Minus World as his inspiration for creating these games, wanting to "recapture the sense of mystery" these moments evoked. Derek Yu, creator of Spelunky, discussed how he holds nostalgia for the Minus World, calling it an "incredible [piece] of lore for [Super Mario Bros.]" while lamenting how modern games lack that kind of mystique.

The 2007 video game Super Paper Mario featured an area called The Underwhere, which acts as an underworld and is called "World −1" by one of its residents, in reference to the glitch. The 2010 video game Super Meat Boy features levels called Minus Warp Zones, which make reference to the glitch.
