= Nintendo New York =

Flagship store of Nintendo corporation

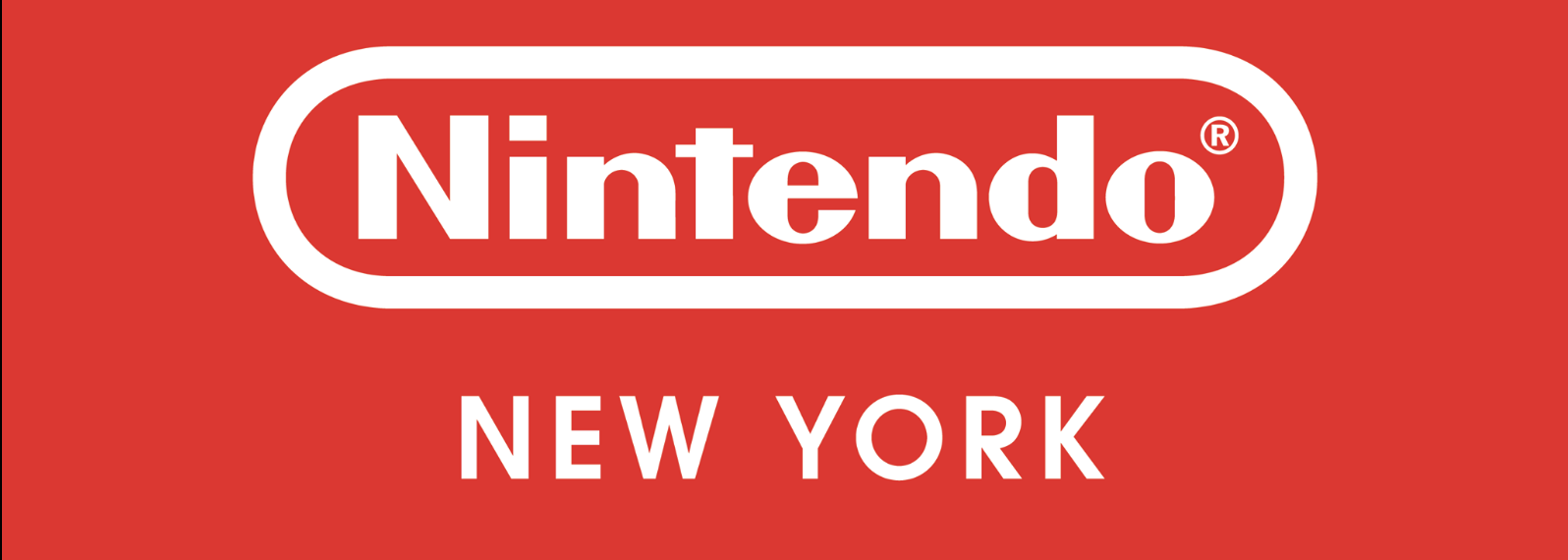

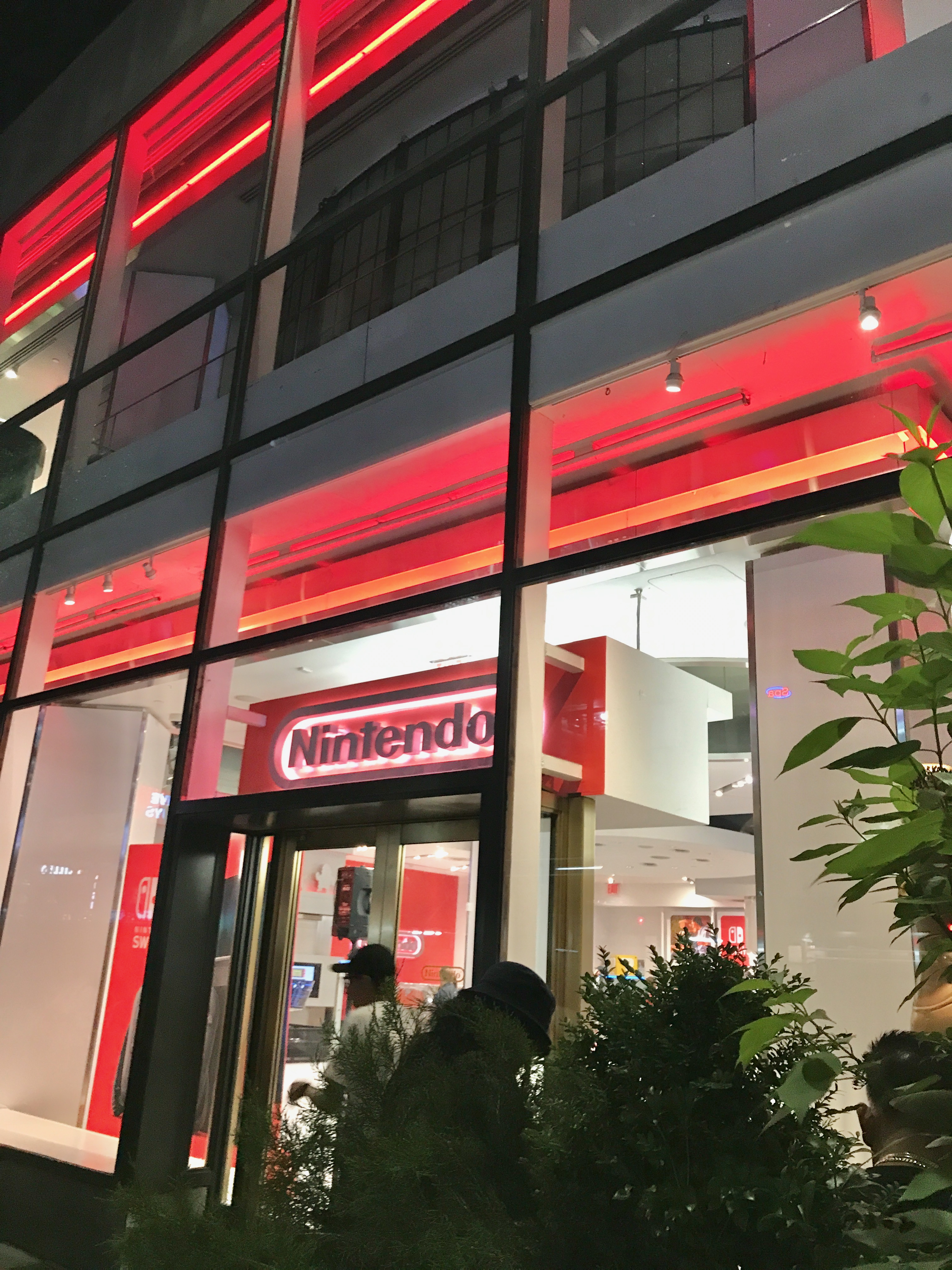
- The Nintendo New York store in 2025
- Type: Subsidiary
- Industry: Distribution, retail
- Founded: November 16, 2001; 25 years ago (as Pokémon Center New York); May 14, 2005; 21 years ago (as Nintendo World); February 19, 2016; 10 years ago (as Nintendo New York)
- Headquarters: New York City, New York, U.S.
- Products: Nintendo products, video games, and merchandise
- Owner: Nintendo
- Website: www.nintendonyc.com

Nintendo New York (previously known as Nintendo World and Pokémon Center New York) is the flagship specialty store of video game corporation Nintendo. Located in 10 Rockefeller Plaza, at Rockefeller Center in New York City, the two-story, 10,000-square-foot (930 m^{2}) store opened on May 14, 2005.

== About ==
The two-floor store sells a wide variety of Nintendo video games and merchandise, including apparel, hardware, and accessories that are exclusive to the store, such as special guides to a wide variety of Nintendo games. The first floor is normally used for general Nintendo merchandise, while Pokémon merchandise is situated in a dedicated section on the second floor.

The second floor features many kiosks with various Nintendo Switch and Nintendo Switch 2 games running, allowing anyone to play. The second floor also features a small museum featuring past Nintendo game systems and peripherals. Notable items include the Power Glove, an original Nintendo Entertainment System, and a Family Computer from Japan.

Nintendo New York regularly holds tournaments and shows for new games, giving early releases and prizes to winners. In addition, they have held screenings for multiple official Nintendo broadcasts including Nintendo Directs.

== History ==
=== Pokémon Center New York ===
On November 1, 2001, Pokémon USA, Inc. announced the opening of Pokémon Center New York on November 16. The two-story, 13,000-square-foot (1,200 m^{2}) would combine a functioning retail store with various interactive facilities, including an "Ultra Pokédex" and a Poké Ball prop that would engush fog and light effects. Game Boy Color systems on the second floor would allow attendees to try out various Pokémon games alongside receiving exclusive Pokémon for their games. Exclusive store items included the Pokémon Mini handheld console. The store was promoted as being the only physical space in the United States dedicated to the franchise.

In 2004, a message posted on the store's website announced that it would close on January 19, 2005, and reopen in the spring with a wider range of Pokémon items alongside products based on other Nintendo franchises.

=== Nintendo World ===
On April 6, 2005, it was announced that the newly-refurbished store would become Nintendo World, and would specialize in all Nintendo franchises aside from just Pokémon, although the franchise would still have a major presence in the store on its second floor. The store reopened with a launch party on May 14.

On September 25, 2005, developer Shigeru Miyamoto visited the Nintendo World store to commemorate the release of Nintendogs and the 20th anniversary of Super Mario Bros.

On July 10, 2010, Dragon Quest creator Yuji Horii visited the Nintendo World store to commemorate the release of Dragon Quest IX: Sentinels of the Starry Skies.

On November 1, 2010, the Nintendo World store re-opened after a three-week makeover that included various upgrades, including the addition of new Nintendo DSi systems, adjusted lighting, and an expanded museum area. Part of the makeover included getting ready for the 25th anniversary celebration of Super Mario Bros. on November 7, 2010. Guests to the celebration included Nintendo of America President Reggie Fils-Aimé and Shigeru Miyamoto.

On November 17, 2012, the Nintendo World store had a big launch event for the Wii U, with hundreds of people in attendance. Reggie Fils-Aimé (who grew up in the NY area) made an appearance at the event.

From November 21, 2014 until January 15, 2015, anyone with a copy of Pokémon Omega Ruby or Alpha Sapphire could receive an Eon ticket for their individual game to have an in-game encounter with Latias or Latios, depending on their version of the game. Once the Eon ticket had been obtained, it could be passed on to other players with a copy of the game for free via StreetPass.

=== Nintendo New York ===
On January 19, 2016, the Nintendo World store was closed for renovation, and reopened its doors one month later, February 19, 2016, with new features in the store. On its re-opening, the store was renamed "Nintendo New York."

On March 14, 2020, Nintendo NY shortened the hours open to the public. Two days later, on March 16, 2020, it announced on Twitter the store would officially shut down due to the COVID-19 pandemic in New York City. On August 5, 2020, Nintendo NY announced it would be reopening the store on August 8. However, visitors had to follow the correct guidelines during the pandemic, and if they wanted to enter the store, they had to book reservations online.

On June 1, 2020, the store's windows were vandalized during a riot in wake of the George Floyd protests.

=== Game Boy damaged in the Gulf War ===
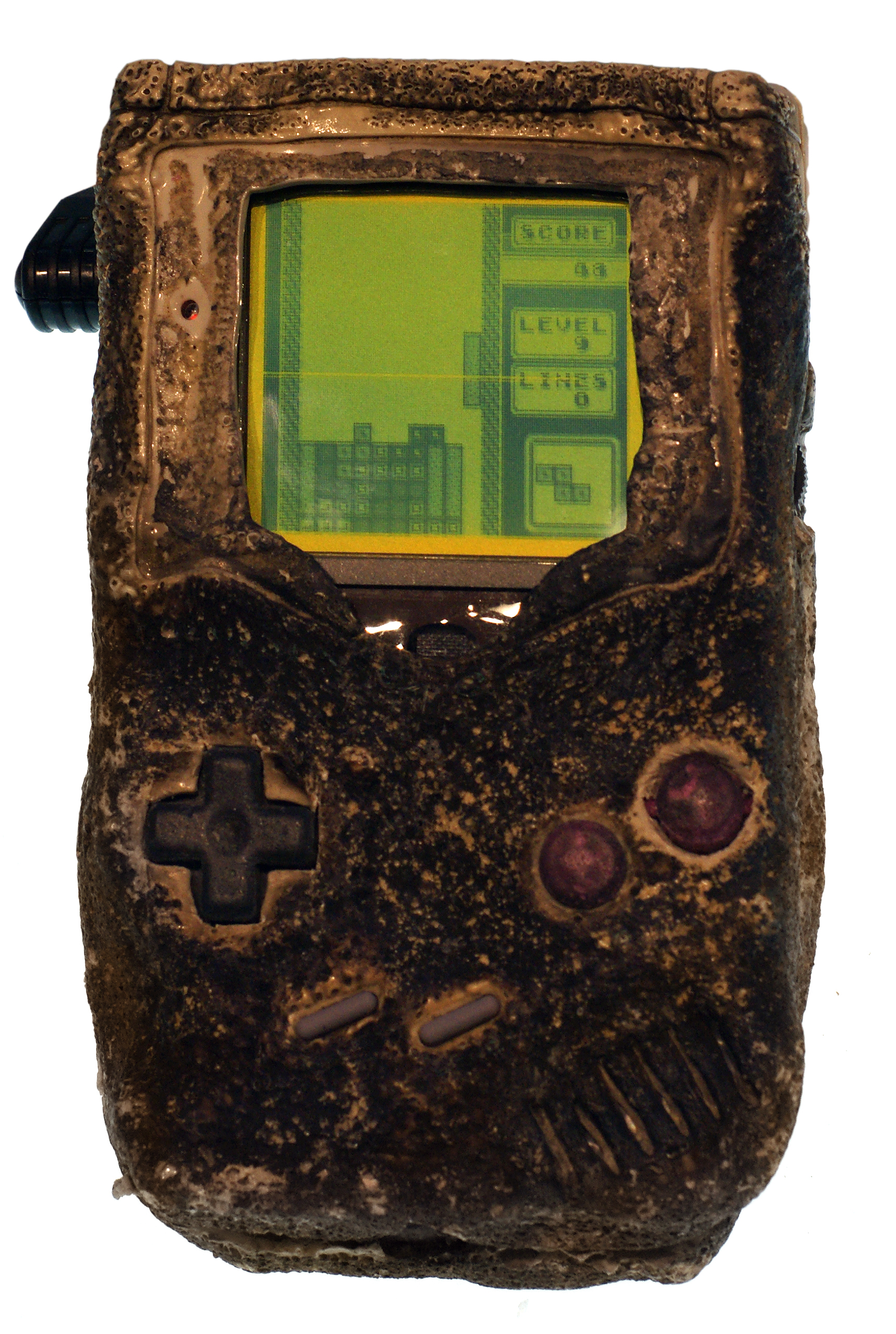
The bomb-damaged Game Boy unit in public display

The museum on the second story once displayed a Game Boy previously owned by Dr. Stephan Scoggins, a medic who was deployed during the Gulf War. The front of the console was severely burned and melted in his barracks during a bombing, and while still in service, Scoggins sent the console to Nintendo of America's magazine Nintendo Power hoping they could replace it. While the technicians that received the console determined it was a "lost cause", they discovered it could still be powered on and that the Start and Select buttons still worked, inserting a copy of Tetris to test it with. Nintendo Power sent Scoggins a replacement Game Boy "as a special 'Desert Storm' courtesy", and his letter asking for a replacement along with pictures of the console were featured in issue #26 of the magazine. The damaged Game Boy was later displayed at the store since its opening as a testament to the console's durability, remaining powered on and receiving timely maintenance until it was confirmed in 2023 that it was returned to Nintendo of America's headquarters in Redmond, Washington.
