= Warp (video games) =

Video game functionality

A warp, also known as a portal or teleporter, is an element in video game design that allows a player character to travel instantly between two locations or levels. A specific area that allows such travel is referred to as a warp zone. A warp zone might be a secret passage, accessible only to players capable of finding it, but they are also commonly used as a primary mean of travel in certain games. Warps might be deliberately installed within puzzles, be used to avoid danger in sections of a game that have been previously accomplished, be something a player can abuse for cheating, or be used as a punishment to a player straying from the "correct" path.

In some games, a player can only use warps to travel to locations they have visited before. Because of this, a player has to make the journey by normal route at least once, but are not required to travel the same paths again if they need to revisit earlier areas in the game. Finding warp zones might become a natural goal of a gaming session, being used as a checkpoint.

== History ==
Though it is unclear which video game first made use of teleportation areas or devices, the element has been traced back to MUDs, where it allowed connected rooms to not be "topologically correct" if necessary. A predecessor appears in the board game Cluedo (1949), where secret passages connect the rooms in the corner of the floorplan to each other. While developing his game Crystal Castles (1983), Franz Lanzinger watched people play Tempest and having to take long periods of time to get to the level of play they wanted to be at. This inspired Lanzinger to include warps in Crystal Castles, to let advanced players get to the more difficult stages early and to keep game time low for more income on a coin-op arcade game.

The element was later popularized by Super Mario Bros., in which secret areas referred to within the game as warp zones allowed players to skip forward through the game.

== Advantages and criticism ==
In Portal, when the player enters one portal, they exit the other.

Author Luke Cuddy states that warps are used to keep the players entertained by "allowing them to jump to the next gameplay goal, straight into the action." However, he has also criticized them for robbing the player of the sensation of "being in" a virtual world, stating that "[b]y emphasizing destination over the places in between, warping encourages a 'quick visit, move-on-to-the-next-place' mentality that frames space as disposable." Warps discourage exploration and may weaken the player's knowledge of spatial relationships.

Ernest Adams critiques possible unexpected behavior by warp zones: "Teleporters can further complicate matters by not always working the same way, teleporting the player to one place the first time they are used, but to somewhere else the second time, and so on. They can also be one-way or two-way, teleporting players somewhere with no way to get back, or allowing them to teleport again."

On the other hand, a 2009 paper by Alison Gazzard from the University of Hertfordshire provides some advantages of warps. Gazzard points that warps can be used to create puzzles and Easter eggs, saying that warps allow the player to "move through spaces in a way not possible in the real world, and discover ‘magical’ ways of traveling through the gamespace." Gazzard points out that warps make "travel from different parts of the game quicker" as well as act as a reward to allow the player to access certain areas.

Despite the linear simplicity of Super Mario Bros., the game has been described as having a "surprising amount of depth and spatial complexity" in part due to secret warp zones found through the game. Portal is a critically acclaimed game that uses warps as its core gameplay mechanic.

== See also ==
- Teleportation
- Teleportation in fiction
- Wraparound (video games)
- Portal fantasy
