= Narcissa Wright =

American speedrunner (born 1989)

- Born: July 21, 1989 (age 37); Stevens Point, Wisconsin, United States
- Education: Columbia College Chicago
- Occupations: Livestreamer, speedrunner
- Years active: 2006–present

Narcissa Wright (born Cosmo Wright on July 21, 1989) is an American speedrunner and co-founder of the website SpeedRunsLive, which allows speedrunners to race with one another in real time. She previously held the records for the fastest completion of The Legend of Zelda: The Wind Waker on the GameCube, The Legend of Zelda: Ocarina of Time on the iQue Player (and later on Nintendo 64 in 2020 after years of competitive speedrunning activity), Paper Mario on the Wii using Virtual Console, and Castlevania 64 on the Nintendo 64.

Wright has attended many notable charity speedrunning events, including Awesome Games Done Quick and DreamHack 2014.

== Early life ==
Wright was raised in Stevens Point, Wisconsin. She later moved to Chicago, Illinois, to attend Columbia College Chicago, where she studied graphic design. After graduating, she worked in freelance art and web design.

== Career ==
In 2006, Wright gained an interest in glitches and exploits used to complete games faster than their designers had intended. She started reading discussions about speedrunning games, at the Speed Demos Archive's forums. She soon began to speedrun games herself and spent hours practicing games, most notably The Legend of Zelda: Ocarina of Time and The Legend of Zelda: The Wind Waker. Wright practiced both of the games for hours while streaming on her Twitch account, building up a large audience. In July 2014, Wright achieved the world record for The Legend of Zelda: Ocarina of Time, completing the game in 18 minutes and 10 seconds on the iQue Player. This run is one of the most famous speedruns of Ocarina of Time, partly due to Wright's video providing commentary and explanation on the methods used in the run, which gained over a million views on YouTube. The record stood for half a year, until it was beaten by three seconds by Joel W. "Jodenstone" Ekman. As Wright's popularity started to grow, she began to stream more games such as Paper Mario and Castlevania 64.

In 2009, she and Daniel "Jiano" Hart together created the website SpeedRunsLive. The two aimed to create a "richly developed speedrunning racing platform" through an Internet Relay Chat community run by a Racebot. The website soon grew to host many speedrunners who live streamed through Twitch. Wright and many other members of SpeedRunsLive have attended various charitable events in the past hosted by Speed Demos Archive, most notably Awesome Games Done Quick. She has supported almost all of these events by running games during marathons.

Wright is also an accomplished Super Smash Bros. Melee player, having played Melee at EVO 2013 and 2014.

In 2015, Wright was invited by Nintendo to attend the Nintendo World Championships along with fifteen other players. She managed to reach the final round of the competition, where she competed with John Numbers to get as far as possible in a series of four Super Mario Maker levels. She placed second in the Championships after facing difficulty with a section of the final level, and received a New Nintendo 3DS XL signed by Shigeru Miyamoto for her efforts.

Wright came out as a transgender woman in November 2015 and began to transition, changing her name to Narcissa. Her public transition subjected her to sustained harassment.

She developed a hand injury, which was exacerbated by speedrunning sessions. Her stream format shifted its focus from speedrunning to less repetitive, social games like Super Smash Bros., losing a significant part of her viewership. Her hand injuries led her to retire from speedrunning, though she returned in 2017 with the release of The Legend of Zelda: Breath of the Wild. The 2023 film Break the Game follows Wright's attempt to regain her previous viewership with her Breath of the Wild streams, as well as her online and real world relationships during this time. In February 2020, she returned briefly after more than four years of personal struggles and taking a step back from competitive speedrunning, achieving a new any% record on The Legend of Zelda: Ocarina of Time, this time achieved on the original Nintendo 64 hardware. Her career, including her personal hardships and successes, was featured in the 2023 documentary Running with Speed, narrated and co-written by Summoning Salt.

Her Twitch livestreaming account has been suspended multiple times. She briefly closed her own account in April 2016 due to harassment. Her Twitch account was suspended indefinitely in 2018 due to violations of the site's policies regarding nudity and sexual content. Wright returned to Twitch and in March 2022 was temporarily suspended after opening graphic content from a viewer on-stream. According to Dot Esports, Wright then made a tweet stating, "I want to kill myself and shoot people at the twitch HQ!!! hahahaah!" After Wright expressed remorse for the posts, Twitch initially reduced her suspension, before later permanently banning her. Wright later deleted the posts and, speaking to Dexerto, said that the threats had never been legitimate and that she did not own weapons. She continued to stream on YouTube.
