= The Mexican Runner =

Video game speedrunner

- Born: Piotr Delgado Kusielczuk; Xalapa, Veracruz, Mexico
- Occupation: Speedrunner
- Years active: 2013–present

Piotr Delgado Kusielczuk, better known as The Mexican Runner (TMR), is a speedrunner who specialises in Nintendo Entertainment System (NES) games. After three years, on February 26, 2017, Kusielczuk was the first player to play through the entire NTSC and PAL NES catalogue, completing 714 officially-licensed titles in a project he called NESMania, which earned him a Guinness World Record. Kusielczuk is also known for his speedrunning accomplishments in Contra, Battletoads, and Cuphead.

== Early life ==
Kusielczuk was born to a Mexican father and Polish mother. He grew up in Xalapa, Veracruz, Mexico.

== Career beginnings ==
Kusielczuk began performing NES speedruns on the Twitch streaming platform on January 3, 2013. Occasionally, his brother Marek (dubbed The Mexican Brother) would also participate in the streams. Together they recorded a two-player Battletoads completion clocking at 38:44.

== NESMania ==
In 2014, Kusielczuk's mother's health started to suffer as she developed kidney cysts. Kusielczuk moved from London to Mexico to take care of her. While speaking online with fellow speedrunners from Chile about the stressful situation regarding his mother's health, they sarcastically suggested that he should play the entire NES library. He decided it was a good idea, and on May 28, 2014, he started streaming a complete playthrough of the entire licensed NES library, beginning with Whomp 'Em. The playthrough was coordinated with a Google spreadsheet and archived as YouTube videos. ТMR named the project NESMania, in honour of Nintendomanía, a 1990s Mexican TV show centred on video games.

The original self-imposed rules were that he would play each game without consulting online strategy guides nor accept help from others for completing the game. The only allowed outside information was the original game manuals. The criterion for when a game was completed depended on the nature of the game, as many of the original NES games had no clear winning conditions and can be played indefinitely for higher scores. If the game had a clear ending sequence or ending credits, that was the winning condition. Otherwise, Kusielczuk would play a game until the game repeated itself or no further progress could be made. In one instance, when playing the Elite port to the NES, a member of the online audience contacted Ian Bell who suggested a winning condition. Kusielczuk wrote,

At first glance this game looks like doesn't have an ending screen and surely doesn't so we had to pick a winning condition and luckily the designer of the game 'Ian Bell' who was contacted by [audience member] 'Alchman' give us an answer. He proposed as winning condition beating the two main missions and having that as goal the rest was figuring out how to do it. [sic]

In this manner Kusielczuk made steady progress through the NES library, streaming it all live on Twitch. Around April 15, 2016 near game #395 (Might and Magic Book One: The Secret of the Inner Sanctum) a modification to the self-imposed rules became necessary when he learned that another runner was also attempting a full completion of the NES library, but using extra outside help with hints and spoilers, which greatly reduced play time. At this point, Kusielczuk decided that he was willing to accept outside help in order to be able to compete on gaming speed and be the first to finish the complete NES library.

The NESMania project attracted attention from the video game press, both when nearing and after completion. When the project was nearing completion, Kotaku reported how Kusielczuk had to spend 91 hours playing Miracle Piano Teaching System, where the winning condition was learning how to play the piano. In an interview with the Mexican publication LevelUp, Kusielczuk explained that despite being a musician, learning how to play the piano was challenging as the game's difficulty continuously increased the required coordination between the two hands, demanding ever more skill. This was the game that took the longest completion time. On February 21, 2017, a few days before the finale, Nintendo Life noted that the project took over 3000 hours of game play time and the final game would be Super Mario Bros. 3. Also just two days before the finale, Waypoint of Vice Media noted how Kusielczuk found Ikari Warriors to be one of the most punishing games and required using save states on an emulator in order to practice, discovering glitches and other speedrunning techniques along the way. After the final streaming on February 26, 2017, of Super Mario Bros. 3, a game chosen for its popularity in order to end NESMania on a high note, Kotaku again reported on the finale, noting Kusielczuk's celebratory song accompanied by guitar performed by himself.

=== Guinness World Record ===
On September 7, 2017, Kusielczuk was awarded a Guinness World Record for the completion of NESMania. The official record reads,

On 26 February 2017, Twitcher "The Mexican Runner", aka Piotr Delgado Kusielczuk (Mexico) finally completed a near-three-year quest to finish every licensed NES game ever released: a total of 714 titles. In total, Piotr spent 3,435 hours 12 minutes 24 seconds in play-time. His website http://themexicanrunner.com/ lists how long he spent on each game. Because not all NES games have clear endings, Piotr played some titles for sustained periods until he could progress no further. For example, he spent just over 91 hours on Miracle Piano Teaching System, alone – a 1990 "game" that teaches players the piano.

— Guinness World Records 2018: Gamer's Edition

== Battletoads speedruns ==
Kusielczuk has stated that his favourite NES game is Battletoads, a game that he considers enjoyable for its varied and famously difficult gameplay. He has also elaborated that he started playing it at age nine and finished the game as a child, but he could not find anyone at the time to share his accomplishments with. A desire to share is what made him start streaming his runs.

Kusielczuk holds the world record in several speedrunning categories in Battletoads, some with fellow speedrunner and rival jay_cee, including:

- Hitless (never taking hit from the enemies or obstacles): 30m 56s
- Warpless (no level-skipping warps allowed): 23m 42s
- Any% Co-op (cooperative two-player mode, with jay_cee, warps allowed): 16m 15s
- Warpless Co-op (cooperative two-player mode, with jay_cee, no warps allowed): 30m 27s

In addition, Kusielczuk is also the former record holder in a couple more categories, such as Any% no wrong warps (no level-skipping not intended by the game designers, but early level termination is allowed).

Kusielczuk has also performed Battletoads speedruns in front of a live audience at the speedrunning events Games Done Quick and the European Speedrunner Assembly.

=== Blindfolded Turbo Tunnel ===
An unofficial speedrunning category he participates in is blindfolded Turbo Tunnel. Many casual Battletoads players consider the Turbo Tunnel to be the hardest level in the game, but experienced speedrunners are able to memorise the level and rely on audio cues to play it. In this manner, Kusielczuk has performed several blindfolded Turbo Tunnel runs live, including a deathless run (no lives lost) at ESA 2018 that garnered a standing ovation from the crowd and was often mentioned during the following days.

The two-player run is of particular note because neither player can be certain by audio cues alone of who made a mistake and lost a life, and both have to start over from the last checkpoint if either loses. Kusielczuk also remarked that in the blindfolded category the exact height that the player character is on-screen is difficult to know, as it depends on the amount of time the up and down arrows on the gamepad are pressed.

== Cuphead speedruns ==
Kusielczuk does not usually run more modern games, but following his audience's suggestions, he started running the notoriously difficult run and gun indie video game Cuphead shortly after its release, quickly rising in the ranks and dominating it. The suggestion came about due to the game's similarity to Contra, another game that Kusielczuk enjoys speedrunning. Soon after the game's release, Kusielczuk started accumulating world records, many of which have since been bested by other speedrunners. He maintains, however, several records, particularly in the cooperative categories with fellow speedrunners luigi100 and SBDWolf.

Kusielczuk's performance attracted the attention of StudioMDHR, the creators of Cuphead, and they endorsed his participation in SGDQ 2018 with promotional artwork for Kusielczuk's mascot in the 1930s Max Fleischer style of Cuphead. Kusielczuk's performance at that event won much acclaim from the audience, with particular praise given to his concurrent gameplay commentary.
