= European Speedrunner Assembly =

Series of charity video gaming events

- Status: Active
- Genre: Video game speedruns Entertainment; Charity
- Venue: Quality Hotel View
- Location: Malmö
- Country: Sweden
- Inaugurated: August 16, 2012; 14 years ago
- Founder: Ludendi Spelförening
- Most recent: February 7, 2026; 8 months ago
- Next event: August 1, 2026; 3 months ago
- Major events: ESA Summer; ESA Winter; Break the Record: Live
- Organizer: European Speedrunner Assembly AB
- Website: esamarathon.com

European Speedrunner Assembly (ESA), formerly European Speedster Assembly, is a semi-annual video game speedrunning charity marathon held in Sweden. Held since 2012, the events have raised hundreds of thousands of dollars for several charities.

The two flagship events of the European Speedrunner Assembly are ESA Winter, held in February every year, and ESA Summer, held between June and August every year. Both events last seven days. In addition to these events, ESA also hosts smaller European-based speedrunning events such as the Benelux Speedrunner Gathering (BSG), as well as Break the Record: Live, a three-day competition to break the world record of a specified game and category. They also host special charity marathons. By 2016, ESA was the second-largest speedrunning event globally. It has been described as "a kind of European federation for these virtual 'athletes'."

Events are broadcast live on Twitch. Viewers are encouraged to donate with incentives and bids, such as choosing character names, having runners perform additional tasks, or extra bonus runs.

== Format ==
ESA runs two main marathons, ESA Winter and ESA Summer, which raise money for charities such as Alzheimerfonden. Speedrunners present runs where they try to beat their chosen games and categories within an estimated time, which is broadcast live on Twitch and in front of a studio audience. Many of the runs feature bonus incentives and additional challenges, such as difficulty upgrades or being performed blindfolded. There are also non-standard speedrun formats, such as relay races.

When donating, donors can choose to put their money towards a particular incentive, such as naming characters.

European Speedrunner Assembly is affiliated with several smaller marathons that use the ESAMarathon Twitch channel, such as Benelux Speedrunner Gathering (BSG) and United Kingdom Speedrunner Gathering (UKSG).

=== Break the Record: Live ===
Break the Record: Live is a sponsored event run by ESA, where the top qualifying players of a particular game and category compete to break the world record live in said category. A prize pool is split amongst the runners depending on their placings during the event, with additional prize money being awarded for breaking the record.

The first event was announced on December 26, 2019, for the Super Mario 64 120 Star category. The seven highest ranked Super Mario 64 speedrunners were flown to Sweden to participate in the live event. The event was sponsored by Elgato Gaming with a $5,000 prize pool, with the first prize being $3,000. An additional $5,000 grand prize was allocated for breaking the record.

In July 2020, the second event, for Doom Eternal, was held during ESA Summer Online 2020, sponsored by the internet security developer Kaspersky Lab.

During a total of eleven Break the Record events held in 2020–2022, the world record has been broken six times.

== History ==
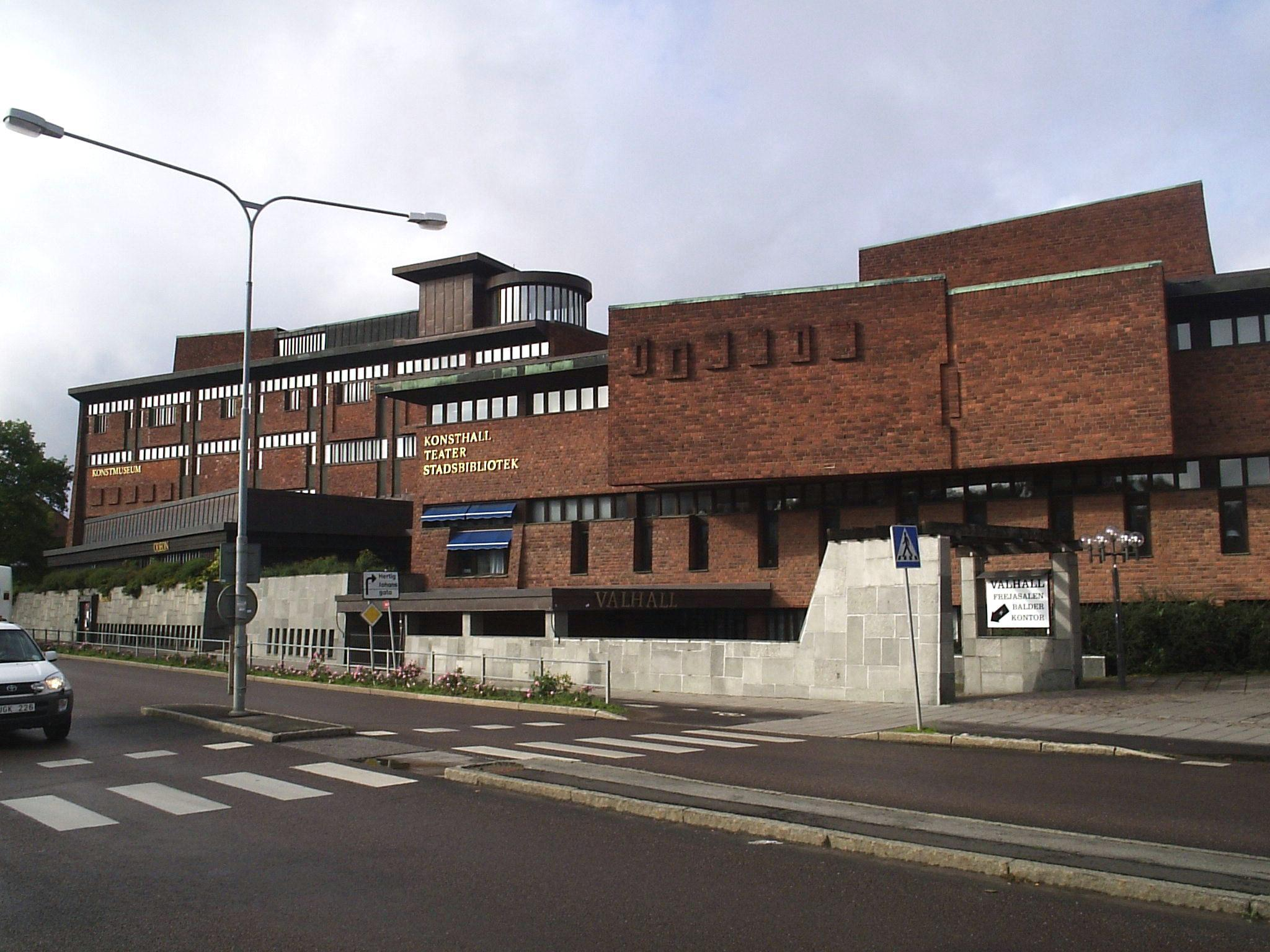
Skövde Kulturhus, the venue for ESA 2012 and ESA 2015

In August 2012, Swedish gaming organisation Ludendi hosted a streaming marathon called European Speedster Assembly in Skövde, raising money for the charity Hand in Hand. It was inspired by Games Done Quick, a similar charity speedrunning marathon based in America.

Ludendi also hosted the events in 2013 and 2014. From 2015, ESA has used the Twitch channel europeanspeedsterassembly.

In 2016, ESA changed its name to European Speedrunner Assembly.

In 2018 the organisation officially registered as a company under the name European Speedrunner Assembly AB. The ESA planned to open an amusement arcade in a former industrial site in Växjö in November 2018. This later turned into Smålands Spelhall which officially opened in 2019.

In 2023, ESA reaffirmed its commitment to supporting any and all gender identities.

ESA Winter 2024, which was held during February 2024, was the first ESA event that was not a continuous 24-hour stream throughout the event, but instead the broadcast was interrupted by scheduled overnight breaks. This type of scheduling was also used for the following ESA Summer 2024 event.

Following a pause for the Winter 2025 event, ESA Summer 2025 was announced to move from its usual July spot and would instead take place in from 27 June – 6 July 2025, with both streams and a 24/7 'fully live' schedule, for the first time since 2023.

== List of events and marathons ==
=== ESA Summer ===
Dates	Location and venue	Charity	Donations raised (Note: The page "History of ESA Events" at ESAmarathon.com has no tracker citations or sources to confirm the amounts between 2012 and 2016. It does state values consistent with the trackers for events starting 2017 and onward, written as full dollars always rounded downwards.)	Information / Notes
August 16–19, 2012	Skövde Kulturhus, Skövde	Hand in Hand	$2,607.99–$3,100 (Note: The original document tracking donations from ESA 2012 shows a final total that is $402 lower than what the official sources claim on its website.)	
July 15–21, 2013	Nyeport, Skövde	Doctors Without Borders	$19,221–$20,155.63 (Note: The total amount presented on the page "History of ESA Events" is $934 below what secondary sources claimed around the time of the event.)	
July 27–August 3, 2014	Nyeport, Skövde	Doctors Without Borders	$35,349	ESA began using two separate streaming channels with individual schedules and game lists.
June 28–July 5, 2015	Skövde Kulturhus, Skövde	Doctors Without Borders	$25,171	
July 23–30, 2016	Fortnox Arena, Växjö	Save the Children	$31,584	European Speedster Assembly changed name to European Speedrunner Assembly. The marathon only had one stream and schedule this year.
July 22–29, 2017	Fortnox Arena, Växjö	Save the Children	$58,626	
July 21–28, 2018	Quality Hotel View, Malmö	Save the Children	$71,598.34	Due to ESA Winter launching in February 2018, marathons in July are officially labelled as ESA Summer. The company European Speedrunner Assembly AB had been founded.
July 20–27, 2019	Quality Hotel View, Malmö	Alzheimerfonden	$85,945.87	
July 24–August 2, 2020	N/A	Alzheimerfonden	$51,985.15	Due to the ongoing COVID-19 pandemic ESA Summer 2020 was replaced with ESA Summer Online, with runners sharing their game feed from their homes. The in person event was pushed back to October 2020 but was later cancelled. Only one stream channel and schedule was used.
July 23–31, 2021	N/A	Save the Children	$67,325.25	Due to the ongoing COVID-19 pandemic ESA Summer 2021 was held online. Only one stream channel and schedule was used.
July 23–30, 2022	Quality Hotel View, Malmö	Save the Children	$120,185.93	Current donation record set at an ESA event. The event raised money specifically towards Save the Children's work in Ukraine during the Russo-Ukrainian war.
July 22–29, 2023	Quality Hotel View, Malmö	Alzheimerfonden	$100,377 (Note: Total amount as shown on official ESA Twitch stream, figures given on ESA website are $83,173.80 for stream 1 and $16,697.92 on stream 2 respectively, for a lower total of $99,871.72.)	The marathon had two streams: the main stream aired non-stop for the whole duration of the event; the second stream aired during February 23–29, 2023 and featured scheduled overnight breaks.
July 20–27, 2024	Quality Hotel View, Malmö	Alzheimerfonden	$57,724	Single stream. This was the first ESA Summer event that had a scheduled overnight break.
June 27–July 5, 2025	Quality Hotel View, Malmö	Alzheimerfonden	$56,666	Two streams: the main stream aired non-stop for the whole duration of the event; the second stream aired during June 29–July 5, 2025.
August 1–8, 2026	Quality Hotel View, Malmö	Make-A-Wish Foundation	$58,640.58	Two streams: the main stream airs non-stop for the whole duration of the event; the second stream airs during August 2–7, 2026.

=== ESA Winter ===
Dates	Location and venue	Charity	Donations raised	Information / Notes
February 20–24, 2018	Quality Hotel Royal Corner, Växjö	Save the Children	$22,611.53	First time ESA Winter was held. The marathon only had one stream. Over 50 games were played.
February 18–24, 2019	Quality Hotel Royal Corner, Växjö	Save the Children	$30,075.68	ESA Winter began using both streaming channels as well, with individual schedules and game lists.
February 16–22, 2020	Quality Hotel View, Malmö	Save the Children	$60,570.37	
February 12–21, 2021	N/A	Alzheimerfonden	$47,531.04	Due to the ongoing COVID-19 pandemic ESA Winter 2021 was held online, with runners sharing their game feed from their homes. Only one stream channel and schedule was used.
February 12–20, 2022	Quality Hotel View, Malmö	Alzheimerfonden	$106,405.59	First event held on a physical venue after the COVID-19 pandemic. First single ESA event to reach over $100,000 in collected charity. The event consisted of a "pre-show" online, with the runners sharing their game feeds from their homes.
February 18–25, 2023	Quality Hotel View, Malmö	Alzheimerfonden	$104,205.11	The marathon had two streams: the main stream (106 games played) aired non-stop for the whole duration of the event; the second stream (48 games played) aired daily from 10 a.m. to 1 a.m. (UTC+1) during February 20–25, 2023.
February 17–24, 2024	Quality Hotel View, Malmö	Make-A-Wish Foundation	$85,146 (Note: Total amount as shown on official ESA Twitch stream, figure given on fundraising site Tiltify is $83,476.74.)	Two streams. This was the first ESA event that had a scheduled overnight break to allow volunteers to rest.
February 7–14, 2026	Quality Hotel View, Malmö	Make-A-Wish Foundation	$42,848	Two streams: the main stream aired non-stop for the whole duration of the event; the second stream aired during February 9–13, 2026.

=== Break the Record: Live ===
Dates	Game	Category	Record broken	Winner	Prize pool	Information / Notes
January 31–February 2, 2020	Super Mario 64	120 Star	Yes	Cheese	$10,000	The world record was publicly considered broken even though it didn't beat the fastest time ever published, also by Cheese, as that record was unverified due to parts of the gameplay footage missing.
July 26–27, 2020	Doom Eternal	No Major Glitches	Yes	xiae	$5,000	Held within ESA Summer 2020, during a single day. Held online due to the ongoing COVID-19 pandemic.
October 30–November 2, 2020	Sonic Adventure DX	All Stories	Yes	Niczur	$3,000	Held online due to the ongoing COVID-19 pandemic.
December 4–7, 2020	Dark Souls: Remastered	All Bosses	Yes	catalyst	$5,000	Held online due to the ongoing COVID-19 pandemic.
January 15–18, 2021	Spelunky 2	All Shortcuts + Tiamat Cosmic Ocean	Yes No	d_tea	$3,000 $5,000	Featured two categories with the competition for one being held on the first day and the other held the final two days. Held online due to the ongoing COVID-19 pandemic. The runner d_tea won both events.
April 30–May 3, 2021	Minecraft	1.16 Random Seed Glitchless	No	Reignex	$10,000	A second prize pool of $20,000 was provided by Dream, offering $4,000 for the first five runs under 15 minutes. Held online due to the ongoing COVID-19 pandemic.
May 28–31, 2021	Super Mario Sunshine	Any%	No	JJsrll	$5,000	Held online due to the ongoing COVID-19 pandemic.
October 29–31, 2021	Super Mario 64	70 Star	No	dwhatever	$5,000	Held online due to the ongoing COVID-19 pandemic.
July 15–16, 2022	Super Mario 64	70 Star	No	Benji64	$5,000	Held at TwitchCon Europe 2022 in Amsterdam.
October 29–31, 2022	Sonic Mania	Sonic & Tails (Good Ending)	Yes	Raflmir	$5,000	Online event.
November 26–28, 2022	Super Mario 64	120 Star	No	Cheese	$5,000	Online event.

=== Other events ===
Event Name	Dates	Location and venue	Charity	Donations raised	Information / Description
ESA at Dreamhack Winter 2015	November 26–29, 2015	Elmia Congress & Concert Hall, Jönköping	N/A	N/A	ESA's first official appearance at DreamHack.
ESA at Dreamhack Summer 2016	June 18–21, 2016	Elmia Congress & Concert Hall, Jönköping	N/A	N/A	ESA at Dreamhack Summer 2016 was held partially online and partially with runners attending on site.
ESA: Winter Highlights 2016	November 24–27, 2016	Elmia Congress & Concert Hall, Jönköping	N/A	$1,089	ESA: Winter Highlights 2016 donations went towards supporting ESA as an organisation. The event was held at DreamHack Winter 2016.
ESA at Dreamhack Summer 2017	June 17–19, 2017	Elmia Congress & Concert Hall, Jönköping	Save the Children	$280	
ESA Movember	November 23–26, 2018	Smålands Spelhall, Växjö	Movember Foundation	$7,199.62	ESA Movember was held partially online and partially with runners attending on site.
ESA TwitchCon Europe 2019	April 13–14, 2019	CityCube Berlin, Berlin	Movember Foundation	$6,175.67	The schedule for ESA TwitchCon Europe 2019 was created by inviting former, established runners to attend the event. The event was held at TwitchCon Europe 2019 in Berlin.
ESA @ Dreamhack Winter 2019	November 29–December 1, 2019	Elmia Congress & Concert Hall, Jönköping	Movember Foundation	$3,809.63	The schedule for ESA @ Dreamhack Winter 2019 was created by inviting former, established runners to attend the event.
ESA Vinterspelen / Metakothon	December 29–30, 2019	Stortorget, Malmö	Save the Children	$2,469.56	A small event held within the central square of Malmö, Sweden. The event was held completely in a part-glass container and only featured speedruns from a runner named Metako.
ESA Together	April 6–14, 2020	N/A	N/A	$12,344.85	This event was held to support ESA and affiliated marathons during the ongoing COVID-19 pandemic.
ESA Corona Relief	May 28–June 1, 2020	N/A	Save the Children	$25,238.05	An event that raised money towards Save the Children's coronavirus emergency appeal during the ongoing COVID-19 pandemic.
ESA Legends	December 6–10, 2023	N/A	Make-A-Wish Foundation	$12,575.17	An event catered to showcasing longer RPG runs.
