= Bubzia =

German speedrunner and livestreamer

- Born: Germany
- Occupations: Speedrunner, video game livestreamer
- Known for: Blindfolded speedruns of Super Mario 64

Twitch information
- Channel: Bubzia
- Game: Super Mario 64
- Followers: 31.7K

YouTube information
- Channel: Bubzia
- Years active: 2017–present
- Subscribers: 32.7K
- Views: 13 million
- Last updated: November 17, 2026

Bubzia is a German speedrunner and video game livestreamer known for completing blindfolded speedruns of several video games, most notably the 1996 platform game Super Mario 64, for which he has set multiple world records.

== Career ==
According to Bubzia, he began speedrunning video games while blindfolded in 2017.

=== Super Smash Bros. ===
In August 2020, Bubzia was interviewed by Shacknews prior to participating in that year's Games Done Quick charity marathon, attempting the "Break the Targets" game mode from the 1999 crossover fighting game Super Smash Bros. while blindfolded.

=== Super Mario 64 ===
In January 2021, as part of Games Done Quick 2021, Bubzia completed the 1996 platform game Super Mario 64 while blindfolded, relying on musical cues and sound effects for timing. He used a GameCube controller for most of the run, though switched to a Wii Remote near the end of the game.

In December 2021, Bubzia broke his own world record for completing Super Mario 64 with 70 Power Stars while blindfolded, finishing in 1 hour, 44 minutes, and 28 seconds. Just a few days later, he beat the game with only one Power Star while blindfolded, finishing in 24 minutes and 16 seconds.

On May 8, 2022, Bubzia became the first person to collect all 120 Power Stars in Super Mario 64 and beat the game while blindfolded, using only audio cues and muscle memory to do so. He had practiced the run every day for more than a year and unsuccessfully attempted it twice earlier in 2022. Bubzia finished the run in 11 hours, 22 minutes, and 43 seconds, having estimated that it would take around 15 hours to complete. According to Guinness World Records, Bubzia had begun training in March 2021 and put in around 700 hours of practice and failed attempts.

In October 2024, Bubzia set the world record for Super Mario 64's blindfolded 16-Star category, finishing in 19 minutes and 43 seconds. He had practiced for 118 days to complete the challenge in less than 20 minutes, having previously set the world record of 22 minutes and 23 seconds. The following month, Bubzia attempted to complete the same challenge with a dance pad, using a standard game controller only to move the camera and pause the game. He called off the challenge after beating the first boss battle against the antagonist Bowser, which took more than 3 hours and 33 minutes.

On February 10, 2021, Bubzia's webcam abruptly turned off during an attempt to beat his own Super Mario 64 70-Star world record, making his run invalid. Due to being blindfolded, Bubzia did not realize that his webcam had broken until he finished the run, which ended up taking almost a full minute longer than his record time. That same month, Bubzia broke three blindfolded Super Mario 64 speedrun world records within four days, beating the 1-Star, 31-Star, and 70-Star categories.

On March 19, 2025, Bubzia completed Super Mario 64's blindfolded 70-Star challenge with a time of 1 hour, 16 minutes, and 41 seconds, breaking his previous world record for the category by more than 3 1/2 minutes.

In July 2025, Bubzia achieved the fastest blindfolded Super Mario 64 run of all time, setting a 1-Star world record of 10 minutes and 32 seconds.

=== The Legend of Zelda ===
In October 2022, Bubzia broke the world record for blindfolded speedrunning the 1998 action-adventure game The Legend of Zelda: Ocarina of Time with a time of 12 minutes and 57 seconds, utilizing a glitch that replaces the player character Link's ocarina with an ignited stick.

In January 2026, Bubzia participated in Games Done Quick 2026, attempting a blindfolded run of a Legend of Zelda game for the Nintendo 64, as voted upon by viewers.

== Reception ==
Reporting on his blindfolded Super Mario 64 120-Star run, Hideaki Fujiwara of Automaton wrote that Bubzia "is considered a stalwart veteran in the field of blindfolded speedruns", praising "the precise adjustment of his location to the ability to stay composed and recover from his mistakes".

== See also ==
- Cheese (speedrunner), another speedrunner and video game livestreamer known for setting world records in Super Mario 64
- List of YouTubers
