= Brazilians Against Time =

Charity video game speedrunning event

- Status: Active
- Genre: Video game speedruns Video games and charity
- Venue: Various
- Location: Brazil
- Country: Brazil
- Founder: Hugo Carvalho
- Website: www.brat.com.br

Brazilians Against Time (BrAT) is a charity video game speedrunning event. Founded in 2016 by the Brazilian speedrunner Hugo "Hugo4fun" Carvalho, the event raises money for charities including Médecins Sans Frontières, APAE-SP (or Instituto João Clemente) and AACD. It was inspired by the American event Awesome Games Done Quick (AGDQ) and was the first video game marathon of its kind in Brazil.

By the 2022 event, Brazilians Against Time had raised a total of 139,000 reais for charitable institutions.

== History ==
The first edition of BrAT was organized by Hugo Carvalho, who had participated in the American Awesome Games Done Quick event since 2013. The first edition took place in São Paulo. According to Carvalho, the event initially had difficulties working with charitable organizations, but managed to garner more support after reaching the donation limit in a campaign for AACD.

In 2018, the marathon held its fourth edition on the Brasil Game Show and received support from the professional CS:GO player FalleN. That year, the event raised 26,000 reais (the sum of the previous two years' revenue combined). They also introduced the "save or kill the animals" incentive from Awesome Games Done Quick, whereby if a donation threshold was reached Super Metroid players would take a longer route to the game's ending by not killing animals.
