= Cheese (speedrunner) =

Trinidadian speedrunner (born 1995)

Allan Alvarez
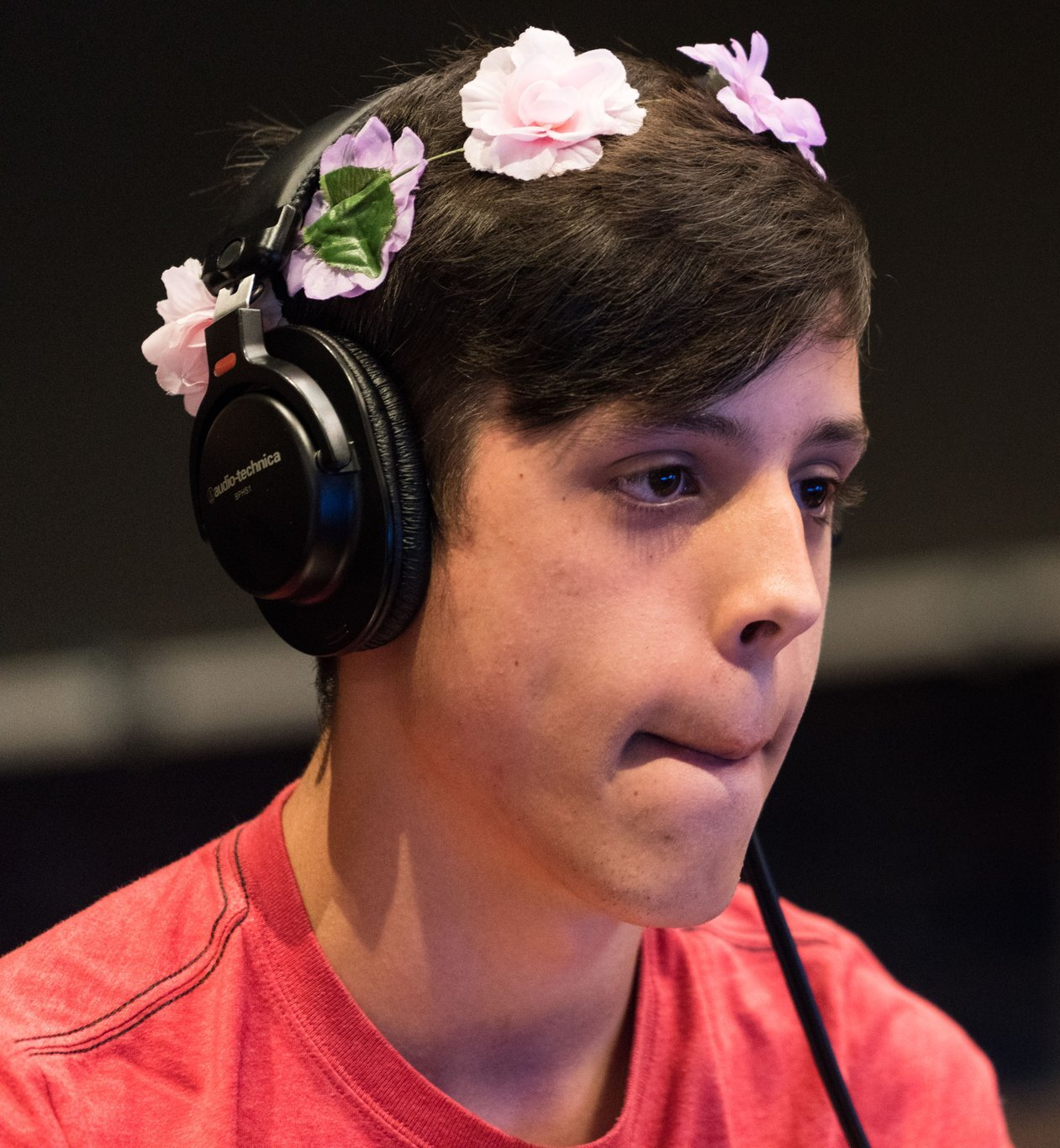
- Alvarez performing a speedrun at Summer Games Done Quick, 2016
- Born: February 26, 1995 (age 31); Venezuela
- Occupations: Livestreamer, speedrunner
- Years active: 2013–present

Allan Alvarez (born February 26, 1995), better known as cheese (originally cheese05 until 2018), is a Venezuelan-born Trinidadian-Spanish speedrunner and podcaster known for his Super Mario 64 (1996) records.

== Personal life ==
Allan Alvarez was born on February 26, 1995, in Venezuela. Alvarez moved to Trinidad when he was two years old. His parents divorced early in his life, which proved to be difficult for Alvarez in his speedrunning endeavors, as his step-father was not supportive at first. This has since changed. Alvarez now describes his step-father as someone he can recognize as his real father and someone who has taught him in life how to be persistent and disciplined at whichever craft he wants to pursue. He always was a very strict and tough figure towards Alvarez, but Alvarez said it helped him to be the strong person he is today.

Alvarez is openly gay, and he grew aware of the anti-gay culture in Trinidad and Tobago and felt he could not live his true life in the country. He felt more inclined to live a city life and decided to move closer to his father's side of the family in Madrid, Spain. Alvarez made the move in February 2016, just before his 21st birthday, and he currently lives with his grandmother, mother, and brother.

== Career ==
Alvarez began streaming his Call of Duty gameplay on Twitch in 2013. In 2014, he started speedrunning and publishing videos to his first YouTube channel. He started uploading to his main channel in 2016. He typically streams around midnight in Spain, which is peak viewing hours for the United States.

In May 2017, Alvarez achieved the world record time (one hour, 39 minutes, 57 seconds) in Super Mario 64 120-star category (essentially 100% completion of the game), and the first time in the category to reach under 100 minutes. In June, fellow streamer Puncayshun set the world record time, beating Cheese's world record time by eight seconds, but lost the world record the following day, after Alvarez obtained a time that was 20 seconds faster than Puncayshun's time. Alvarez was recognized by Red Bull that month for his Super Mario 64 gameplay.

In Super Mario 64, Alvarez achieved the world record time in the 70-star category in January 2018. He focuses mostly, however, on the 120-star category, where he has held the world record on many occasions throughout his career.

In February 2018, Alvarez uploaded the first episode of his podcast with speedrunner Ryan Reeves, better known as "Simply", titled Two Dads One Show, a podcast centered on speedrunning and the mentality and work ethic associated with speedrunning. The name was later changed to The Two Dads Podcast. The following day, Alvarez broke the 120-star world record time for Super Mario 64. It was later taken by speedrunner Liam in March. Later that year, he officially changed his username from cheese05 to his current username.

Alvarez held the world record time in Super Mario 64 120-star category from February 28, 2022, to November 18, 2022, when it was beaten by speedrunner Weegee. As of November 27, 2024, Alvarez is ranked 5th in the 120-star category.

In addition to Super Mario 64, Alvarez has also completed speedruns for The Legend of Zelda: Ocarina of Time (1998), Super Mario Odyssey (2017), and Celeste (2018).

Alvarez is featured in the 2023 documentary film Running with Speed, narrated by Summoning Salt.

== See also ==
- Bubzia, another speedrunner and video game livestreamer known for setting world records in Super Mario 64
