= Running with Speed =

- Theatrical release poster
- Directed by: Patrick Lope; Nicholas Mross
- Written by: Patrick Lope, Nicholas Mross, Summoning Salt
- Produced by: Patrick Lope; Nicholas Mross
- Starring: (Alphabetical order, as credited on iMDB): Allan Alvarez; Torje Amundsen; Devin Blair; Mason Cramer; Mitch Fowler; Andrew Gardikis; GrandPooBear; Brandon Jacobson; Jayson; Eric Koziel; Kristensen; Marshall; Satoru S.; Sinister1; Summoning Salt; Christine T.; Mike Uyama; Collin Wojcik; Narcissa Wright; Kasumi Yogi
- Narrated by: Summoning Salt
- Edited by: Patrick Lope
- Music by: Ray Sneed (sound design and audio engineer) Marc Pattini (additional sound design
- Production company: Wild Arrow Media
- Distributed by: Good Deed Entertainment
- Release date: January 6, 2023
- Running time: 148 minutes
- Country: United States
- Language: English

Running with Speed is a 2023 documentary film about speedrunning directed by Patrick Lope and Nicholas Mross. It was written by Lope, Mross, and Summoning Salt, the latter of which also narrated the documentary.

== Summary ==
The documentary is split up into three main parts, first introducing Summoning Salt and then focusing on classic Mario games such as Super Mario Bros. and Super Mario Bros 3. It then covers the legacy and history of Games Done Quick and its charitable impact on the world and how it fosters the growth of professional careers for featured speedrunners, many of whom earn a living from streaming on Twitch. It also covers the Nintendo World Championships and other speedrunning competitions, including Kaizo competitions.

The documentary mostly focuses on Nintendo classics from the 1980s and 1990s, including Super Mario 64, The Legend of Zelda: Ocarina of Time, Punch-Out!!, and Super Metroid, amongst others. Notable speedrunners featured in the documentary include Allan "Cheese" Alvarez, David "GrandPooBear" Hunt, and Narcissa Wright.

== Reception ==
=== Critical reviews ===
Writing for techraptor.net, Andrew Stretch wrote, "[Running with Speed takes] the time to set up what Speedrunning is at the start, giving viewers a working foundation of knowledge before diving deep enough into Speedrunning to explain how pixel-perfect jumps and sequence breaking are so important to get the best possible times while speedrunning games like Super Mario Bros. 3 or Super Metroid. Whether you're brand new to Speedrunning or have been tuning in to AGDQ for years[,] chances are this documentary will have something new for you to learn."
