= Mitten Squad =

American YouTuber (1996-2023)

- Joseph Robert Wilson obituary photo
- Born: Joseph Robert Wilson; May 15, 1996
- Died: December 14, 2023 (aged 27)
- Occupation: YouTuber
- Years active: 2013–2022
- Known for: Challenge run

YouTube information
- Channel: Mitten Squad
- Genres: gaming; comedy; Challenge run
- Subscribers: 1.46 million

Joseph Robert Wilson (May 15, 1996 – December 14, 2023), known online as Mitten Squad, was an American YouTuber known for challenge run gaming videos.

== Career ==
Wilson began posting to YouTube in 2013, with his first video being a Minecraft let's play. Wilson's later content focused on gaming challenges, such as completing a game while using only a specific item or without performing certain actions.

Wilson's channel reached one million subscribers in October 2020.

== Personal life and death ==
On March 4, 2021, Wilson announced that his YouTube channel was on an indefinite hiatus. He stated that he was an alcoholic, that he had "done damage to my body and damage to my apartment" and that he wasn't sure when he would come back. On May 2, 2023, Wilson posted on X that he had been hospitalized due to his drinking.

Wilson died on December 14, 2023, aged 27. No official cause of death was publicly disclosed.

== Legacy and Tributes ==
Members of the Fallout and The Elder Scrolls communities paid tribute to Wilson after his death.

Following Wilson's death, Fallout fans began asking video game developer Bethesda to include him in Fallout 5.
