= Video games and charity =

Video game-related fundraising events

Due to the perceived negative connotations of video games, both industry members and consumers of video games have frequently collaborated to counter this perception by engaging in video gaming for charitable purposes. Some of these have been charitable groups, or regular and annual events, and the scope of these efforts have continued to grow, with more than US$22 million having been raised by video game-related charity efforts in the first half of 2018 alone.

== Organizations and events ==
=== Child's Play ===
The creators of the Penny Arcade webcomic, Jerry Holkins and Mike Krahulik, established the Child's Play charity in 2003 following a string of mass media stories that attempted to portray video games in a negative light. The charity was designed to provide toys and video game systems and games to various children's hospitals in the United States, though both monetary and physical donations. By 2017, Child's Play had raised over US$40 million through both cash donations and donated items.

=== Extra Life ===
Extra Life is an annual charity fund-raising event to support the Children's Miracle Network Hospitals. The event was started in 2008 to honor Victoria Enmon, a teenager who died of acute lymphoblastic leukemia. While gamers accept funds for Extra Life throughout the year, the event encourages streamers to play video games for twenty-four hours straight via Twitch or other streaming services over a specific weekend in November, and collect additional donations from their viewers. In 2017, over 50,000 streamers helped to raise over US$11 million for the hospitals.

=== Desert Bus For Hope ===
The comedy group LoadingReadyRun ran a Child's Play event in 2007 by marathon-playing the game Desert Bus, a game created by Penn & Teller, in which the player must drive a bus on a desolate stretch of highway from Tucson to Las Vegas, roughly eight hours of continuous gameplay, with little challenge outside of player fatigue. The event was successful, in part due to recognition from Penn & Teller, and eventually spun out into its own annual "Desert Bus for Hope" event. During the stream, broadcast over Twitch and other streaming sites, viewers can donate to get virtual time behind the bus's wheel, as well as participate in various auctions. The 2018 event raised over US$700,000 for Child's Play, with total accumulated donations exceeding US$5 million.

=== Games Done Quick ===
Games Done Quick was launched in 2010, inspired by the Desert Bus for Hope, with the idea that invited participants speedrun numerous games over the course of the event, typically five to six days, usually with commentary over the course of the games. During semi-annual event, the speedruns are performed live in front of an audience and broadcast to Twitch and other services, with viewers able to donate during the length of the event. There has also been shorter one-off special Games Done Quick events for specific occasions, such as one to support the victims of the 2011 Tōhoku earthquake and tsunami. As of January 21, 2019, Games Done Quick has raised over US$19 million to various charities, including Prevent Cancer Foundation in its winter events and Doctors Without Borders in its summer events.

=== Humble Bundle ===
Humble Bundle was initially launched by Wolfire Games in 2010 as a series of game bundles, most frequently indie games, offered at a pay-what-you-want price, with all but a few dollars of each sale going to a designated charity. As the bundles became more successful, Humble Bundle's approach expanded to include other bundles, such as mobile games, console games, and digital books, as well as establishing its own company, created publishing support for indie games and establishing a dedicated storefront, where a portion of each purchase goes to a selected charity. By 2017, the various activities of Humble Bundle have raised over US$100 million across 50 different charities, including Action Against Hunger, Child's Play, the Electronic Frontier Foundation, charity: water, the American Red Cross, WaterAid and the Wikimedia Foundation.

=== Jingle Jam ===
Since 2011, The Yogscast have organised a series of live streams every year in December to benefit charity. The idea began when fans would send presents to founders Lewis Brindley and Simon Lane during the Christmas season, but they would instead insist that the money be donated to charity.

By end December 2023, Jingle Jams had raised over £25m for over 40 different charities.

In August 2022, Jingle Jam was registered as a charity in England and Wales, with the Charity Commission, independent of The Yogscast. More info:

== Notable one-off efforts ==
=== Pink Overwatch Mercy skin ===
During May 2018, to support the Breast Cancer Research Foundation, Blizzard Entertainment offered a limited time character customization skin for the Overwatch character Mercy that reflected the pink colors of breast cancer awareness, with all revenue from the sale of the skin going to the Foundation. By the end of the sale, Blizzard had raised over US$12.7 million, which at the time, was the largest single donation that the Foundation had seen.

=== 2018 E3 Fortnite Pro-Am ===
Epic Games ran a celebrity Fortnite Battle Royale pro-am during the Electronic Entertainment Expo 2018 in June 2018, which paired 50 popular streams with 50 celebrities, with an overall US$3 million prize pool to be given to the winners in the names of their desired charities.

=== H.Bomberguy's stream for Mermaids ===
In January 2019, streamer Harry Brewis a.k.a. "hbomberguy" ran a marathon stream to beat Donkey Kong 64 and raise money for Mermaids, a British charity for transgender youth. The stream began following comments made by Graham Linehan which Brewis considered transphobic, and whilst potential funding of Mermaids by the British National Lottery was under review. Word of mouth about the stream quickly spread and several notable pro-trans supporters briefly joined his stream, including John Romero, Chelsea Manning, and U.S. congresswoman Alexandria Ocasio-Cortez. Brewis finished the marathon after 57 hours, having raised over US$340,000 (£265,000) for Mermaids, with 659,000 viewers having watched the stream.
