= Percy Barnevik =

Swedish businessman (1941–2025)

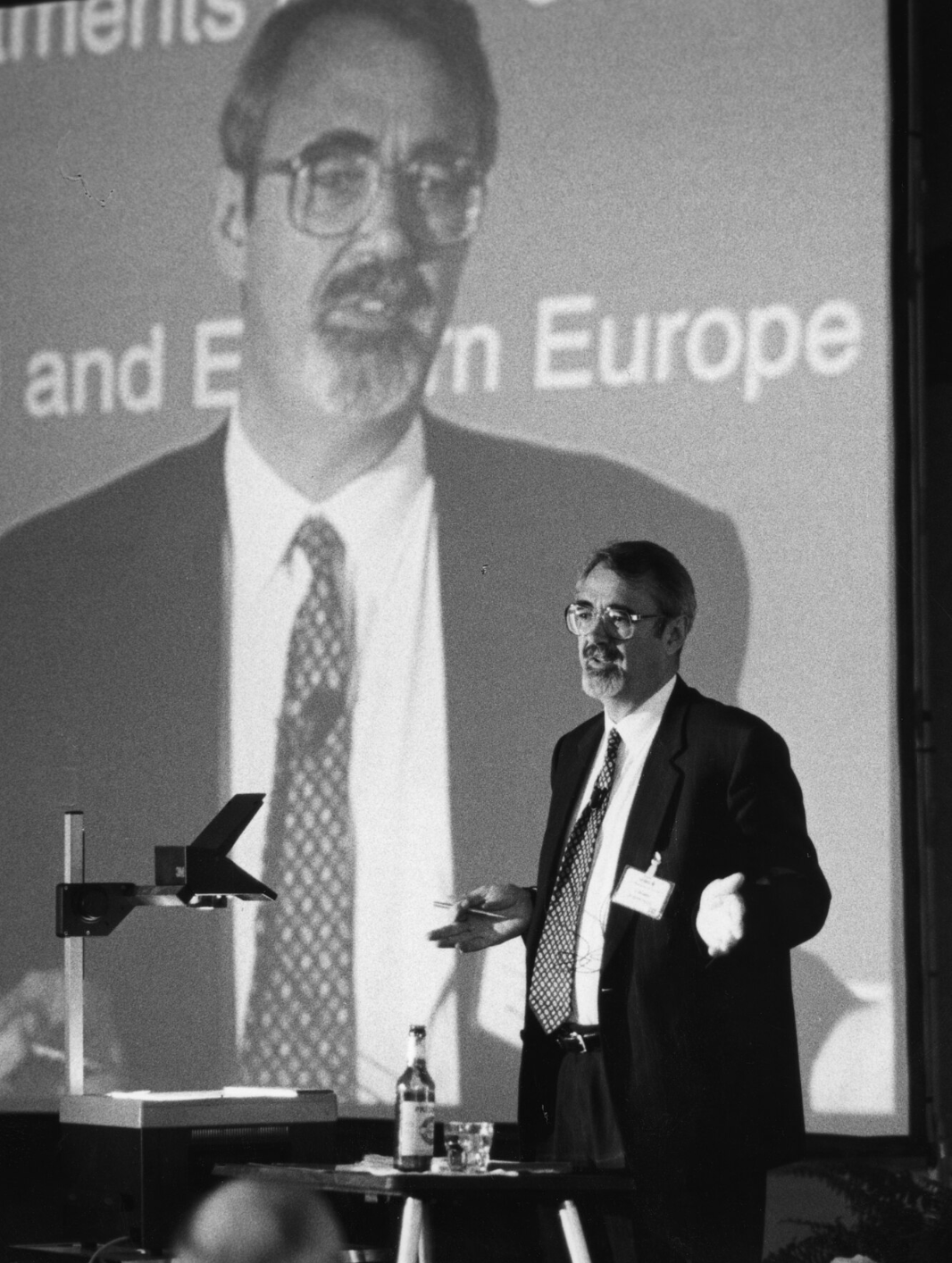
- Barnevik in 1996
- Born: 13 February 1941; Simrishamn, Sweden
- Died: 18 July 2025 (aged 84)
- Education: Gothenburg School of Business, Economics and Law
- Occupation: Business executive

Percy Nils Barnevik HonFREng (13 February 1941 – 18 July 2025) was a Swedish business executive, best known as CEO and later chairman of ABB, and for being the centre of a giant pension dispute that shook Sweden in 2002. He was the co-founder of the non-profit organization Hand in Hand.

== Background ==
Born in Simrishamn in southern Sweden, the youngest of three children, he grew up in Uddevalla, north of Gothenburg, where his parents operated a small printing company. Barnevik was educated at the University of Gothenburg's School of Business, Economics and Law and at Stanford Graduate School of Business. He received seven honorary doctorates in Sweden, Finland and the U.S., including from Linköping University (1989) and the University of Gothenburg (1991). In 1993, Barnevik received the IEEE Engineering Leadership Recognition Award.

== Career ==
Barnevik started his professional career in the Swedish company Datema, but soon moved to Sandvik. In Sandviken, where between the years 1969 and 1970 he hired over 150 people, his employees said "he has some kind of magic in him—you just can't refuse his offer." He developed unique relationships with many of his colleagues which helped him to improve the communication. In 1975, he was promoted to CEO of Sandvik's American operations, Sandvik Steel. Within the next four years he tripled the revenues, grossing $250 million, and turned the company profitable. During his work in the United States, Sandvik started competing against the industry leaders, such as General Electric and U.S. Steel.

In 1979 he joined ASEA, a leading Swedish heavy industrial company based in Västerås. In 1987 he decided to merge with its Swiss competitor – Brown, Boveri & Cie. It was the largest merger at that time. He held the position of CEO of ASEA 1980–87, was CEO of ABB from 1988 to 1996. He was Chairman of Sandvik 1983–2002, Chairman of Skanska 1992–1997, Chairman of Investor AB 1997–2002, Chairman of AstraZeneca 1999–2004, Chairman of ABB 1996–2002, Member of the Board of DuPont, USA 1991–1998 and Member of the Board of General Motors, USA 1996–2009. He was also a regular Bilderberg Group attendee 1992–2001 and belonged to the group's Steering Committee.

During his eight years as CEO of ASEA followed by the nine years as CEO of ABB, the company achieved an increase of stock value of 87 times or 30% average per year over the 17 years. Net profit increased 60 times and sales 30 times. Based upon these extraordinary results Barnevik received a one-off payment of 148 million Swiss francs when he retired as CEO in 1996. 2002, six years later under a second succeeding CEO, ABB stock market value plummeted from 54.50 francs in 2000 to just under 15 francs. When ABB's board made the pension payment public, a huge scandal ensued and Barnevik was forced to resign as chairman of Investor, the Swedish investment company controlled by the powerful Wallenberg family, and to hand back a large chunk of his pension to ABB.

== Philanthropy ==
In 2003, Barnevik co-founded charity Hand in Hand with Dr Kalpana Sankar in Tamil Nadu, India. The charity, which fights poverty through job and business creation, has since grown to include programs in 10 countries: Kenya, Rwanda, South Africa, Eswatini, Lesotho, Zimbabwe, India, Afghanistan and, more recently, Cambodia and Myanmar. Hand in Hand's mission is to work for economic and social empowerment of the poorest and most marginalized people by supporting the development of businesses and jobs. Since 2003, the Hand in Hand network has helped start and sustain 1.3 million businesses and has generated 1.9 million jobs.

== Personal life and death ==
Barnevik lived in London. In an interview he once stated that he took a test which stated he was unsuitable for a managerial position.

Barnevik died on 18 July 2025, at the age of 84 from complications of a stroke.

== Affiliations ==
- Member of the Business Council and the International Investment Council advising the South African government
- Member of the Advisory Council of Centre for European Reform, UK
- Member of the Advisory Council at the Wharton School of Business Administration
- Member of the Advisory Council at the Humboldt University in Berlin
- Member of the Royal Swedish Academy of Sciences since 1982
- Member of the Governing Board and Advisors at the Grassroots Business Fund
- Member of the Advisory Council at the Academy of Engineering Sciences in Finland
- Foreign Honorary Member of the American Academy of Arts and Sciences (1999)
- Honorary Fellow, the Royal Academy of Engineering
- Honorary chairman, Hand in Hand International

Business positions
| Preceded by Torsten L. Lindström | CEO of ASEA; 1980–1987 | Succeeded by n/a |
| Preceded by n/a | CEO of ABB; 1988–1996 | Succeeded by Göran Lindahl |
| Preceded by Peter Wallenberg, David de Pury | Chairman of ABB; 1996–2002 | Succeeded by Jürgen Dormann |
| Preceded by Arne Westerberg | Chairman of Sandvik; 1983–2002 | Succeeded by Clas Åke Hedström |
| Preceded by Bengt Haak | Chairman of Skanska; 1992– 1997 | Succeeded by Melker Schörling |
| Preceded by n/a | Member of the board DuPont; 1991– 1998 | Succeeded by n/a |
| Preceded by Peter Wallenberg | Chairman of Investor AB; 1997–2002 | Succeeded by Claes Dahlbäck |
| Preceded by n/a | Chairman of AstraZeneca; 1999–2004 | Succeeded by Louis Schweitzer |
