= Speed Demos Archive =

Website for video game speedruns

- Website type: Gaming website
- Available in: English
- Website: speeddemosarchive.com
- Registration: Optional
- Launched: April 1998; 28 years ago
- Current status: Active

Speed Demos Archive (SDA) is a website dedicated to video game speedruns. SDA's primary focus is hosting downloadable, high-quality speedrun videos, and currently has runs of over eleven hundred games, with more being added on a regular basis. SDA additionally used to host two annual speedrunning charity marathons, Awesome Games Done Quick (AGDQ) and Summer Games Done Quick (SGDQ), before Games Done Quick LLC started holding the event independently in 2015. It hosted nine marathons in total, and raised over $2.7 million for various charities, with the most successful one being AGDQ 2014 which raised just over $1 million for the Prevent Cancer Foundation.

== History ==
SDA originally began as a demo archive of Quake playthroughs. SDA was formed initially by Nolan "Radix" Pflug of Pittsburgh, Pennsylvania by merging with a site created by Gunnar and Jesse in April 1998. In 2004, after the success of his own 100% Metroid Prime run, Radix expanded SDA to include demos of other games. Mike Uyama took over in 2006 as the site's administrator. In January 2010, SDA ran its first charity marathon, Classic Games Done Quick, raising over $10,000 for CARE.

== Content ==
As of March 2018, SDA hosts speedrun videos of over 1,200 games. These videos are all available for download, and almost all are available in multiple video qualities. The site includes videos of popular games as Mega Man, Metroid, The Legend of Zelda, Super Mario Bros., and Sonic the Hedgehog. The site has been featured numerous times in publications such as Electronic Gaming Monthly and G4tv's Attack of the Show!. Some of the runs also appeared in an episode of Pure Pwnage.

=== Submissions ===
Speedruns submitted to SDA undergo a comprehensive verification process performed by SDA community members familiar with the game in question. Participants scrutinize the recording in evaluation of both its gameplay and video quality. The review process also attempts to certify that the submitted speedrun contains no foul play such as cheating (Note: Distinct categories may be created that allow the use of in-game cheats, such as those that enable higher levels of difficulty. Alternatively, categories have been established that allow the use of some cheats (e.g. Banjo-Tooie).), hacking, or improper segmenting. Additionally, participants ensure that the submission adheres to the site's rules, as well as any game-specific and category-specific requirements. SDA staff evaluates the community responses and makes a final determination regarding whether or not the run is to be accepted. This verdict is posted publicly in the SDA forum alongside the verifying users' responses.

If a submission is accepted, the video of the run is encoded in multiple qualities and posted on the site alongside the runner's comments, which can detail specifics regarding the run. Some runs also contain a second audio track with additional commentary from the runner.

=== Rules ===
Generally, Runs with no sound, horribly loud or overpeaked sound, or mixed-in music are unacceptable.

==== Fundamentals ====
Submitted speedruns are typically performed on their native consoles. When performing a run of a PC game, the rules may mandate that certain computer configurations be adhered to. In general, SDA will not accept runs that are performed on emulators, as emulation can be influenced by the configuration of the computer being used. Furthermore, it is particularly difficult to verify whether or not a run performed on an emulator is tool-assisted. Nevertheless, SDA does permit the use of emulators in certain cases; submissions performed on the Game Boy Player, GameTap, and Virtual Console are allowed. Virtual machines and DOSBox are allowed in cases where an older PC game does not run properly on modern computers. Use of this software is reserved for specific circumstances and these submissions must adhere to several additional rules. Due to potential emulation inaccuracies, runs that utilize an emulator may be categorized separately from those of the original release. (Note: "Due to problems with many official emulators, we will place [runs performed on] them in separate categories if the known differences make comparison with runs made on other platforms difficult.")

Non-cosmetic modifications to a game, console, or controller are not allowed. Glitches that are triggered by interfering with the normal operation of the hardware or game media while the game is running, such as the crooked cartridge trick are not permitted. In-game glitches or exploits may be permissible, contingent on the category being run.

It is required that runs be recorded using direct-feed capture. This is typically done using a capture card or DVD recorder. A run may be rejected if the quality of the recording is insufficient.

==== Segmentation ====
- Segmented
  - Utilizing the in-game save system, the run is performed in multiple parts. Segmented runs allow the player to retry each individual section of the game as many times as they desire. As a result, fully segmented submissions are heavily scrutinized and held to a higher standard of gameplay than single-segment runs.
- Single-segment
  - The entire game is beaten from start to finish in a single sitting. Excluding situations in which doing so is necessary to continue the game, the player may not utilize either soft or hard resets.
- Single-segment with resets (also known as real-time attack)
  - A single-segment run that permits resetting the game. Not every game is eligible for this form of segmentation; it is typically only utilized when the use of resets saves a substantial amount of time.

==== Completion ====
SDA accepts runs that adhere to one of three different completion requirements:

- any%
  - The game is beaten as quickly as possible without any regard to completion.
- 100% (Note: The speedrun communities in some games utilize game-specific categories that are functionally synonymous with 100% completion (e.g. the "120 Star" category in Super Mario 64).)
  - The player must complete all content (Note: The definition of 100% varies from game to game. Some games have dedicated percentage trackers that indicate the level of completion, whereas in other cases, the community determines the specifics that constitute total completion of the game.) prior to beating the game.
- low%
  - The game is beaten with the lowest completion percentage possible.

==== Additional categorization ====
Discrete runs of the same game can vary substantially based on self-imposed restrictions such as using a specific character, playing the game on a specific difficulty level, avoiding the use of glitches and exploits, or requiring completion of optional objectives. These restrictions can result in a single game having multiple (often contradictory) definitions of completion, called categories. Consequently, a single game may possess separate leaderboards for each category.

== Charity work ==
Following an initial meetup at MAGFest, the SDA community, inspired by TheSpeedGamers, began their first charity marathon in January 2010, titled Classic Games Done Quick. Both direct-feed gameplay footage and webcam footage of the runners were live-streamed on SDA's homepage. The marathon was a success, raising over $10,000 for CARE. Starting in 2011, SDA began two annual marathons: Awesome Games Done Quick during the winter, and Summer Games Done Quick during the summer. Each subsequent marathon has become substantially more successful than its last iteration, with AGDQ 2011 and AGDQ 2012 raising $53,000 and $149,000 respectively for the Prevent Cancer Foundation.

In April 2011, following the Great East Japan earthquake, SDA put together a marathon titled Japan Relief Done Quick. The marathon was executed by having each runner live-stream their run from their home, rather than having everyone travel to a central location. JRDQ raised $25,000 for Doctors Without Borders.

During the marathons, a chip-in widget is placed beneath the streaming video, which visually displays how much has been donated so far, and which allows people watching the runs to donate money directly to the charity through a PayPal account. Viewers who donate are given the option to have a message sent to the marathon attendees to be read during the stream, allowing them to vote with their donation money for, among other things, which games they want played, what they want in-game characters to be named, or to request runners to perform specific feats such as difficult tricks or glitches. Prizes are available throughout the marathon; all donors are entered into a raffle to win them provided they meet the varying minimum donation sum within the time window for each prize. All donations always count towards the grand prizes, but most other prizes require donating during certain game runs or themed game blocks.

On 27 January 2013, SDA announced that AGDQ 2013 had raised $448,423.27, surpassing Desert Bus for Hope 6's donation total of $443,165.29 to become the most successful single gaming charity marathon at the time. On 1 August 2013, SDA announced a donation total of $255,160.62 from the SGDQ 2013 marathon. On 16 January 2014, SDA announced over $1,025,000 in donations raised from their AGDQ 2014 event. Summer Games Done Quick 2014, was held from 22 to 28 June, and raised over $718,000 for Doctors Without Borders.

== See also ==
- Speedrun
- Games Done Quick
- Twin Galaxies
