= Summoning Salt =

American speedrunner and YouTuber

- Born: United States
- Occupations: Speedrunner; YouTuber

YouTube information
- Channel: Summoning Salt
- Years active: 2017–present
- Genre: Speedrunning documentaries
- Subscribers: 2.16 million
- Views: 295.4 million
- Last updated: 21 November 2026
- Website: https://summoningsalt.com/

Summoning Salt is a pseudonymous American speedrunner and YouTuber known for his video documentaries about the history of speedrunning records. As of October 2026, his channel has over 2 million subscribers and around 290 million video views.

== Speedrunning career ==
Summoning Salt is one of the leading speedrunners of the NES video game Mike Tyson's Punch-Out!! (MTPO). As of December 2025, he holds the records for a variety of MTPO categories, including single-segment (playing through the entire game in one sitting), where his 14:46 time is over 13 seconds faster than the No. 2 speedrunner.

In addition, Salt has held the record for the fastest Mike Tyson boss fight since 2017. The fight is highly optimized and requires a significant amount of random number luck (referred to in speedrunning as "RNG"), plus excellent execution, to lower any further. He is the first person to finish the fight in fewer than two in-game minutes (i.e., the "1:59 barrier"). He broke the 2:01 barrier in 2020, but it took him 40,000 attempts to lower his time to 2:00 (in June 2024) and around 35,000 more attempts to lower his time to 1:59. Of those 75,000-odd attempts, sixteen cracked the 2:01 barrier. He said that he would stop focusing on the Tyson fight after reaching the 1:59 milestone, but predicted that someone else would break his record eventually.

Salt also plays the game blindfolded, and set a single-segment world record in 2022. As of December 2025, he is the only player to have completed the game blindfolded in under 20 minutes.

Like a significant minority of creators online, Salt guards his personal identity and used to stream his world record attempts on Twitch without showing his face, but revealed his face for the first time in a video in June 2025. The name "Summoning Salt" was coined from a mispronunciation of "seasoning salt", originally derived from a video by British YouTuber Stuart Ashen.

== Video documentaries ==
Salt began making speedrunning documentaries after watching a livestream by fellow speedrunner Sinister1 about the history of speedrunning records for one specific MTPO fight. In January 2017, Salt released "World Record Progression: Mike Tyson". Because of its positive reception, Salt started producing videos about other video games. His style was inspired by sports video documentarian Jon Bois. By March 2022, Salt's channel was popular enough that he was able to quit his job and begin producing videos on a full-time basis.

By March 2022, Salt had over 30 speedrun histories documented and 1.25 million subscribers; less than two years later, his documentary count had doubled. His videos have also crept up in length and complexity, frequently hitting the 45-minute mark. Some of his more recent videos are as long as feature films; his MTPO video was over 2 hours long.

According to Salt, the research is the longest step of producing a video: "I have to contact various community members, form a small Discord server, ask questions, watch tutorials, [and] play the game itself." Finding the narrative is another factor: "I have to figure out which storylines are important, what to emphasize, and how to emphasize it. This process also takes several weeks."

In January 2021, Salt was featured in a podcast by the Video Game History Foundation.

In September 2022, his video about the history of Mega Man 2 speedruns was repeatedly age-restricted, first for "excessive swearing," and following a successful appeal, breaking a "sex and nudity policy" despite having no sexual or nude content. News outlets reported that Salt's saga exemplified the confusing moderating system of YouTube.

Salt narrated Running with Speed, a documentary about the speedrunning community, which was released on streaming platforms on January 6, 2023.

== Reception ==
Salt's videos have been featured on Kotaku, Mashable, Vice, and Polygon. Jay Castello of Eurogamer called Summoning Salt "the most famous creator in the speedrun history space". Adam Downer of Know Your Meme said: "Any video game fan and YouTube enjoyer has likely stumbled across Summoning Salt, arguably the internet's premier speedrunning historian who has carved a significant niche on the platform with his lengthy, detailed and surprisingly gripping documentaries about the history of various video games' world record speedruns." About his video regarding the history of level 4-2 in Super Mario Bros., Polygon's Charlie Hall said: "Using archival footage and in-depth knowledge of the speedrunning community, Summoning Salt has created a legitimate documentary of the level. Not only does he explain the tricks and techniques needed to get through it as quickly as possible, he focuses on the evolution of those strategies over time and the people who discovered them. It's a master class in speedrunning a classic Nintendo game, and an excellent entrée into the genre as a whole."

== Videography ==
The following are Summoning Salt videos that also released on home media.

Year	Title	Medium	Runtime
2025	The History of Halo 2 World Records	VHS	59 minutes
2025	The History of Mega Man 2 World Records	VHS	78 minutes
2026	The History of Cuphead World Records	VHS/DVD	76 minutes
