= Hand in Hand International =

Non-governmental organization

- Formation: 1980
- Type: Non-governmental organization
- Purpose: Job and business creation, reducing poverty, economic and social empowerment, women
- Headquarters: London, United Kingdom
- Region served: India, Afghanistan, Kenya, Tanzania, Zimbabwe
- Key people: Co-founders: Percy Barnevik and Dr Kalpana Sankar
- Website: www.handinhandinternational.org

Hand in Hand International is a registered non-profit organisation based in London, UK. It is part of the Hand in Hand network, whose shared vision is to fight poverty through job and business creation. Hand in Hand was founded by Percy Barnevik and Dr Kalpana Sankar.

Hand in Hand’s mission is to work for the economic and social empowerment of the poorest and most marginalized people by helping women beat the odds and succeed as entrepreneurs. Since 2003, the Hand in Hand network has helped start and sustain 5.6 million businesses and generated 10 million jobs. Hand in Hand works in the same field as BRAC, Opportunity International, CARE, Bill & Melinda Gates Foundation and Aga Khan Foundation.

== History ==
The story of Hand in Hand begin in the late 1980s with two Swedish teachers – Olle and Gunnel Blomqvist – visiting the district of Kancheepuram. Children traditionally constituted a cheap source of labour for the weaving industry in Kancheepuram, and parents who did not have permanent jobs would send their children to master weavers. Bringing such children out of labour was Hand in Hand's initial focus.

At the end of 1990 the Blomqvists came in contact with Percy Barnevik, who became a sponsor to the organization. Barnevik was interested in the teachers' work in India.

Hand in Hand India was founded in 2003 by Barnevik and Dr Kalpana Sankar in the Indian state of Tamil Nadu. The Hand in Hand network has operated programs in 10 countries across Asia (Afghanistan, India, Cambodia and Myanmar) and East Africa (Kenya and Rwanda).

Hand in Hand receives funding from a number of different sources including individuals, corporations, bi-lateral and multi-lateral institutions and trusts and foundations. Recent supporters include the FMO, Sida, Johnson & Johnson Corporate Citizenship Trust, Nationale Postcode Loterij and Voxtra (philanthropic foundation based in Oslo, Norway). Hand in Hand Afghanistan also received a US $1.16 million (€840 K) grant from the European Union.

In 2007, Hand in Hand Afghanistan was set up with Seema Ghani as chair. On 19 February 2014, Ghani gave an interview with the BBC about the economic challenges facing Afghanistan and how job creation will help solve many of the challenges. She also gave an interview to Forbes magazine regarding the positive effect of micro-businesses on Afghanistan.

In 2013, Hand in Hand launched the Enterprise Incubation Fund (EIF), through which philanthropists can provide loans to micro-entrepreneurs in Kenya.

As of 2021, Hand in Hand International's board of trustees included Bruce Grant (Chair), Dr John Barrett, Dr Madhvi Chanrai, Carsten Jorgensen, Lars G Josefsson, Paola Uggla and Stephanie Whittier.

== Hand in Hand network ==
The organizations within the Hand in Hand group actively support each other, although they are independent and each organization has its own governance and management structure as well as strategic plan. Each organization is represented by its CEO on the Hand in Hand Global Council. The Global Council coordinates policy and activities across the Hand in Hand network.

Today, the Hand in Hand network extends to:

- Hand in Hand India
- Hand in Hand Eastern Africa
- Hand in Hand Afghanistan
- Hand in Hand International
- Hand in Hand Sweden
- Hand in Hand Zimbabwe

The network has support and fundraising offices in London, Stockholm and New York.

== Job creation model ==
The Hand in Hand network uses a comprehensive business creation model, initially developed by Hand in Hand India, to fight poverty. There are five interlinked elements that deliver the Hand in Hand approach:

- Community engagement: Hand in Hand works with men, women and communities to challenge the deep-rooted attitudes that prevent women from working.
- Social mobilization: Hand in Hand helps organize people, mostly women, into Self-Help Groups (SHGs), who meet weekly with their trainers to discuss social issues and activities. Together, they begin to save money, learn financial discipline and build up group savings funds for which they are jointly responsible.
- Business training: Once a group has demonstrated stability and financial responsibility, Hand in Hand provides business training in how to start, grow and sustain a small enterprise and become an entrepreneur.
- Credit access: Most groups hold joint savings in local savings accounts and learn how to manage these. Should financial resources be required beyond group members’ own savings, we support participants to access formal finance.
- Market linkage support: Hand in Hand provides support in improving productivity and competitiveness, including advice on better packaging, pricing and branding; cheaper sourcing of supplies; quality control; reliable delivery; and more effective identification of and negotiation with buyers.

== Awards ==
Hand in Hand International's work has won numerous awards, including:

- National Fundraising Award
- Bond Outstanding Individual Award, Seema Ghani
- Charity Awards, International Aid and Development Category, honorable mention

Hand in Hand International has also been recognized for its range of employee benefits, including work-from-home Fridays, extended parental leave and more and in 2024 was shortlisted for the Working Families Award.

== Results ==
Globally, Hand in Hand has generated 5.6 million businesses and 10 million jobs. An independent report published in 2012 confirmed that 97.4% of the jobs are sustainable. Another report published in 2019 found that 80% of businesses were still operational a year after Hand in Hand programs concluded.
