= Fortnox Arena =

Arena in Växjö, Sweden

Coordinates: 56°52′58″N 14°46′33″E

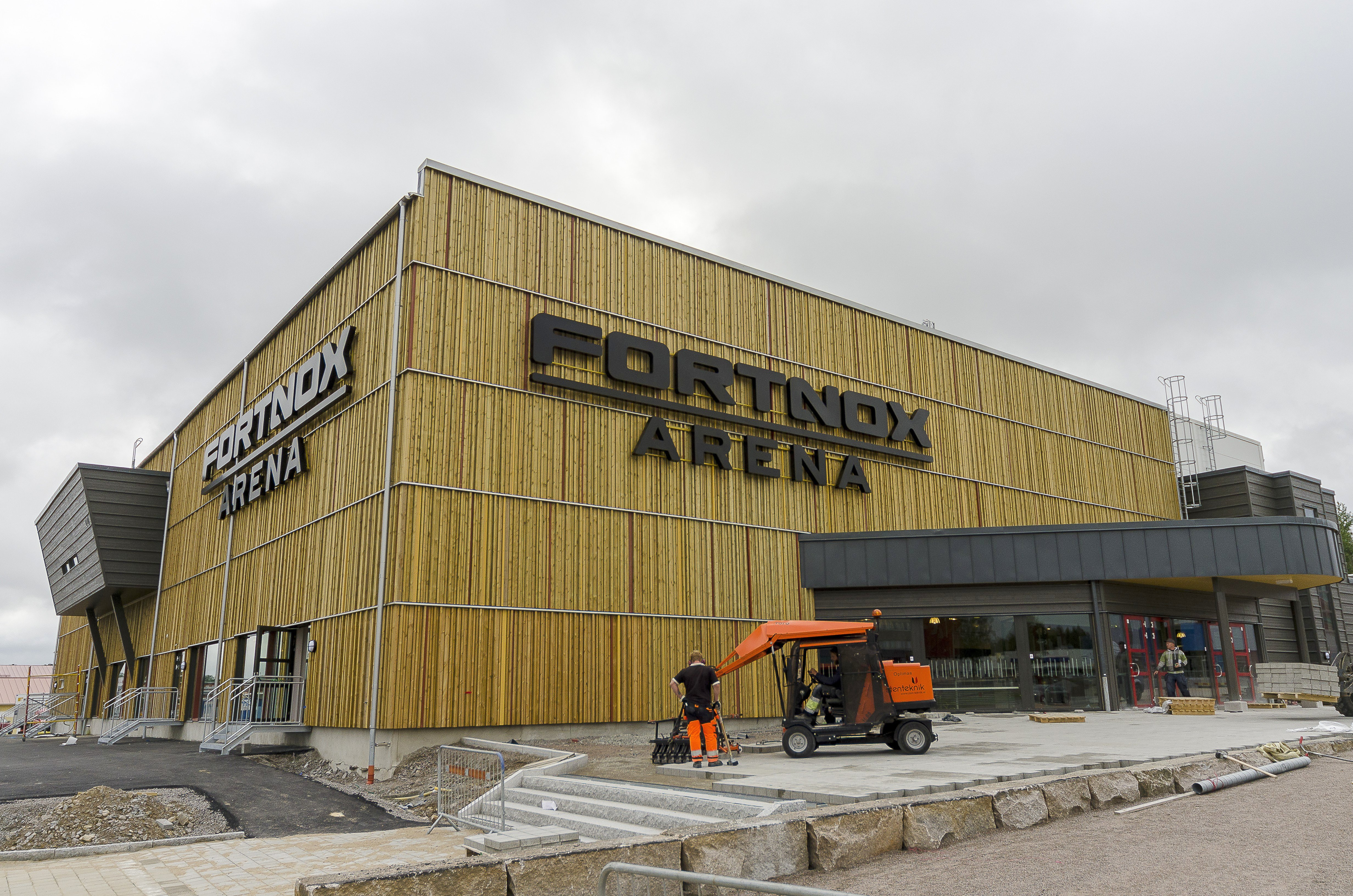
- Fortnox Arena in 2012
- Interactive map of Fortnox Arena
- Location: Växjö, Sweden
- Owner: Växjö IBK

Construction
- Opened: September 2012

Tenant
- Växjö IBK

Fortnox Arena is an arena in Växjö for floorball. Fortnox Arena was officially opened in September 2012.
