= Sequence breaking =

Act of performing actions in a video game out of order

In computer and video games, sequence breaking is the act of performing actions or obtaining items out of the intended linear order or of skipping "required" actions or items entirely. Sequence breaking is often used to beat a game unusually quickly (such as speedrunning), to beat it while only completing a few objectives or obtaining a few items, to obtain useful items early in the game, to make the game more difficult, or to help push a game as far as possible in some other way.

== History of the term ==
Though sequence breaking as a concept has existed almost since the inception of computer games complex enough to have sequential storylines, the first documented action in a video game to be called a sequence break occurred in the Nintendo GameCube game Metroid Prime, in a thread called "Gravity Suit and Ice Beam before Thardus". In the game, the rock monster Thardus was designed to be a required boss before the Gravity Suit and the Ice Beam could be obtained, hence the novelty of bypassing the boss while still obtaining the items and thus saving time if the goal is to complete the game as quickly as possible. When Steven Banks achieved this feat on January 18, 2003, he posted his discovery on the Metroid Prime message board on GameFAQs. The thread attracted a number of interested gamers, and the term sequence breaking was incidentally coined. The term has since grown in popularity and is now sometimes applied to unintended shortcuts in any game.

The term has become so pervasive that it has begun appearing in video games itself, and, inspired by games such as Super Metroid, game designers may create their games with sequence breaking in mind.

== See also ==
- Emergent gameplay
- Speedrunning
