= Challenge run =

Playthrough of a video game with additional self-imposed rules

A challenge run is a playthrough of video games with additional self-imposed rules or constraints that make the game more difficult. They are generally attempted by experienced players seeking a unique or more difficult game experience. Challenge runs are popular among the gaming community, with runs often being livestreamed and particular challenges amassing their own speedrunning scene.

== Overview ==
Challenge runs are often attempted by players familiar with the game to diversify the game experience or make it more difficult. Such playthroughs often feature strategies too obtuse or irrelevant for intended play. Certain tasks may become impossible to do normally, requiring glitch abuse or sequence breaking to progress. Other tasks may be luck-based, potentially requiring a restart in case of bad luck. Multiple rulesets may be combined for added difficulty. Challenge runs are sometimes officially supported in the game, rewarding the player with items or achievements upon challenge completion. Certain challenge runs, such as randomizers, require mods or ROM hacking to change game logic. Videos of challenge runs are often uploaded to online video platforms, with some being livestreamed.

== Common types ==
=== Inclusionist and exclusionist ===
All-coins challenge run of the first level in SuperTux

Inclusionist challenge runs require doing a specific task before finishing the game, such as collecting every coin, while exclusionist runs prohibit doing these tasks. Inclusionist runs are usually made more difficult by objects erroneously placed out of bounds by developers that may still be required, while exclusionist runs typically suffer from seemingly unavoidable objects that require the use of glitches.

==== Completionist ====
A completionist run, known in speedrunning as 100%, is an extension of the inclusionist run that requires doing every task that the game may offer, such as completing every level or unlocking every character. This playstyle is often supported and encouraged in games via completion percentages and achievements.

==== Low% ====
An inversion of the completionist challenge, Low% tasks the player with completing the game while only collecting items and doing tasks that are required for progression, skipping any content that can be considered extra. Some video games such as Metroid: Zero Mission encourage players to try a Low% run, with unlockable content as rewards.

==== Any% ====
Generally not used outside of speedrunning, this term is used as a contrast to the 100% and Low% categories, to indicate that completion is not considered as part of the run. This is often the default speed running category.

==== Pacifist ====
Pacifist run of the first level in SuperTux

Pacifist challenge runs disallow killing or hurting enemies. Boss characters are sometimes excluded from the ruleset due to them often being required to progress through the game. Certain games are built with this playstyle in mind, most notably Undertale.

=== Permadeath ===
Permadeath runs require restarting the whole game after the character's death, as if the character only had one life. Certain games feature built-in difficulty modes that remove the save file after death, most often present in survival games. Damageless runs are an extension of the permadeath ruleset with players not being allowed to take a single hit of damage.

=== Blindfolded ===
Blindfolded runs task the user with beating the game without any visual information. This is often done with a blindfold or by turning off the display. Such runs require extensive game knowledge and high reliance on audio cues or haptic feedback.

=== Randomizer ===
Randomizer challenge runs use external tools or mods to randomly shuffle levels, items or other in-game content. This is typically done with retro games running on emulators with custom scripts for memory manipulation, though more modern games can also be randomized using conventional mods. Due to the chaotic nature of randomizers, certain levels or items required for progression may become inaccessible, resulting in a softlock and rendering the run impossible.

=== Unusual input device ===
Players may attempt to beat video games by using a controller or other input methods not originally designed for it. This is usually done with controllers that have less buttons than a usual controller, such as the Wii Remote, or controllers designed for a specific game or playstyle in mind, such as trackballs, sim racing wheels and guitar controllers.

== Notable challenge runs ==
=== Nuzlocke ===
Nuzlocke is a challenge run in Pokémon games where knocked out Pokémon cannot be used again for the rest of the run. The formula was created by Nick Franco in 2010 and has since become a popular way to experience Pokémon games by people who find the original playstyle too easy or too stale.

==== IronMon ====
The IronMon challenge combines Nuzlocke and randomizer rules while adding a catch limit of one Pokémon per route. The challenge is considered to be considerably more difficult than Nuzlocke. A variation of the challenge, Kaizo IronMon, adds an additional limit of one Pokémon that can be used in a battle.

=== LASO ===
Legendary All Skulls On, often abbreviated as LASO, is a challenge category in Halo games that requires completing the game on the highest difficulty with all optional difficulty modifiers, such as disabling the HUD or making the enemies permanently cloaked. The LASO run for Halo 2 has been widely considered among Halo fans to be the most difficult run in the entire series. The playstyle is officially supported by Halo Studios, with Halo: The Master Chief Collection featuring achievements for completing the LASO challenge in specific games in the collection.

=== Elden Ring Fisher-Price controller ===
In 2022, streamer Rudeism modified a Fisher-Price Game & Learn controller, originally designed as a simple toy that makes sounds, to connect to personal computers and transmit inputs. Rudeism then used the controller to beat Elden Ring, a game known for its difficulty.
