= Prevent Cancer Foundation =

American nonprofit organization

- Founded: 1985; 41 years ago (as Cancer Research Foundation of America)
- Founder: Carolyn R. Aldige
- Location: Alexandria, Virginia, U.S.
- Region served: United States
- Method: Funding cancer research, education and community outreach programs.
- Key people: Gary Lytle, Board Chair
- Employees: 26
- Website: www.preventcancer.org

The Prevent Cancer Foundation (PCF), formerly the Cancer Research Foundation of America or the Cancer Research and Prevention Foundation, is a United States-based charity US health organizations devoted to the early detection and prevention of cancer.

== Description ==
Through research, education, outreach, and advocacy, the Prevent Cancer Foundation aims to help people avoid a cancer diagnosis or detect their cancer early enough to be successfully treated. PCF meets the 20 Standards for Charity Accountability outlined by the Better Business Bureau, is rated 4 out of 4 stars (100/100) by Charity Navigator, and is a Guidestar 2022 Platinum Transparency participant.

The Foundation aims to reduce cancer deaths by 40% by 2035. To achieve this, the Foundation plans to invest $20 million in technology to detect cancer early and advance multi-cancer screening, $10 million to expand cancer screening and vaccination access to medically underserved communities, and $10 million to educate the public about screening and vaccination options.

== Works ==
PCF holds professional conferences around the U.S. for those involved in the field of cancer. They have funded over 300 scientists and over 430 peer-reviewed research projects across the world in more than 150 leading research institutions nationwide, as well as raised awareness of cancer and educated the public about it through exhibits, the distribution of material, and working with the media. Such public education seeks to teach people how they can lower their chances of getting cancer, as well as how to detect early signs of cancer. Their work on colorectal cancer prevention established a framework for health care professionals to collaborate on colorectal cancer screening and prevention, which was lacking beforehand, and they have had extensive influence on Capitol Hill, including their Congressional Families Cancer Prevention Program.
