= Games Done Quick =

Semiannual video game speedrun charity marathon

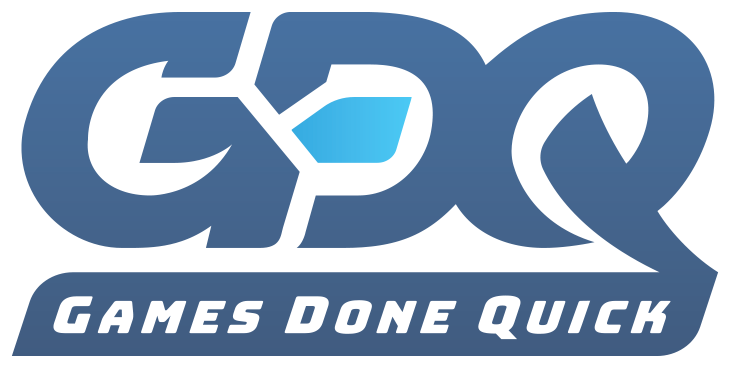
- Status: Active
- Genre: Video game speedruns Video games and charity
- Venue: Various
- Location: Various
- Country: United States
- Inaugurated: January 1, 2010; 16 years ago
- Founder: Mike Uyama
- Most recent: July 11, 2026; 4 months ago
- Next event: January 3, 2027; 46 days' time
- Organizer: Games Done Quick, LLC
- Website: gamesdonequick.com

Games Done Quick (GDQ) is a semiannual video game speedrun charity marathon held in the United States, originally organized by the Speed Demos Archive and SpeedRunsLive communities. Since 2015, it has been handled by Games Done Quick, LLC. Held since 2010, the events have raised money for several charities.

The two flagship events held by Games Done Quick are Awesome Games Done Quick (AGDQ), held in early January every year, which raises money for the Prevent Cancer Foundation, and Summer Games Done Quick (SGDQ), usually held in late June or early July every year, which raises money for Doctors Without Borders. Both events last for seven days. In addition to these events, GDQ hosts several other broadcasts throughout the year, including smaller marathons supporting different charities, one-off events for special occasions, and regular GDQ Hotfix programming throughout the year.

The events are broadcast live on Twitch and is simulacasted on YouTube since AGDQ 2026. Viewers are encouraged to donate for incentives during the stream such as selecting the name of the save-file or main characters, having the runners attempt more difficult challenges, and entering sweepstakes for a chance to win prizes. As of January 2026, over $59.8 million has been raised through over a million individual donations.

== Format ==
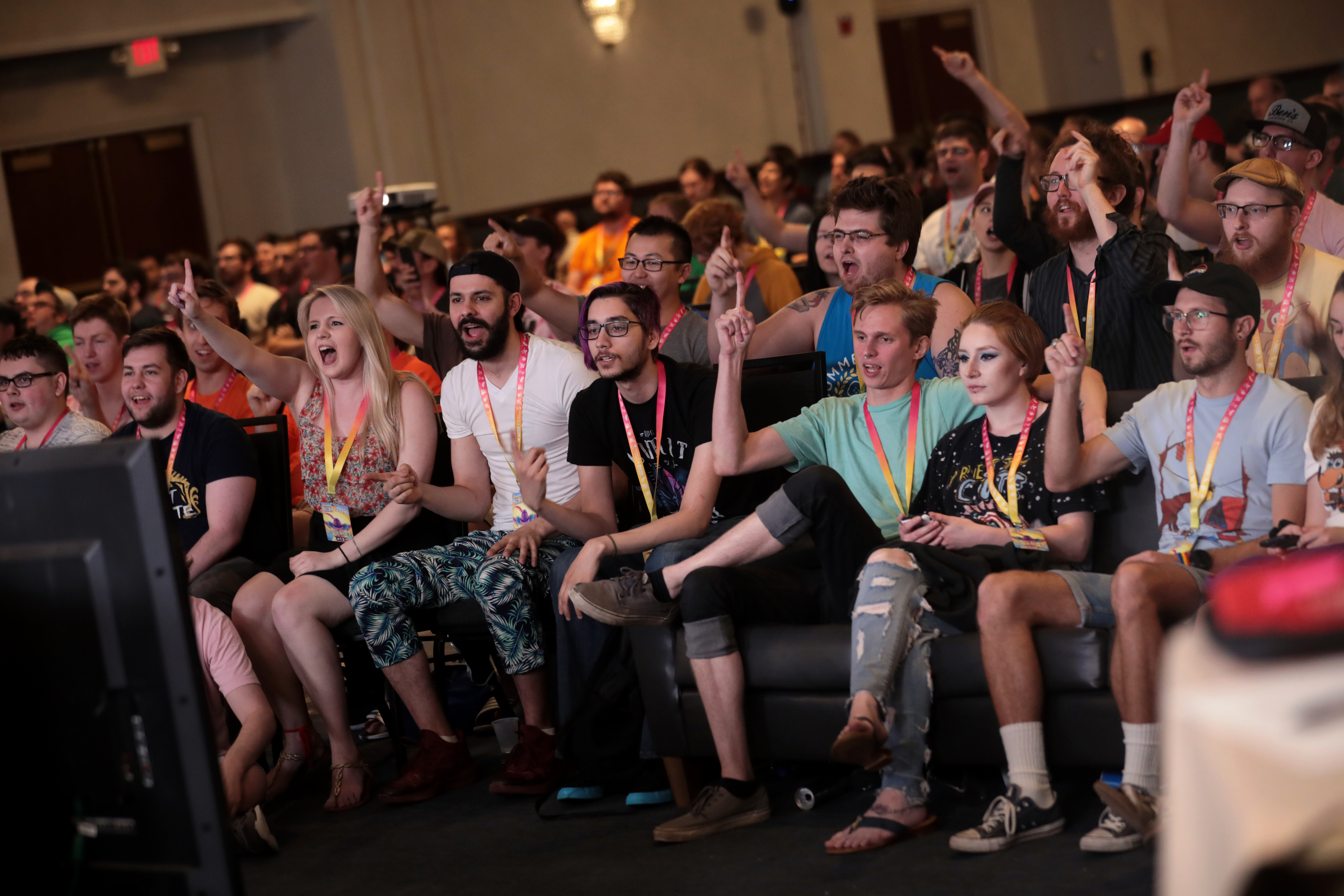
Attendees at Summer Games Done Quick 2019

Speedrunners take turns demonstrating their prowess at beating various video games in the quickest possible time, done in front of an audience as well as a livestream through Twitch. Sometimes these runs may be executed in an unusual or specific way, such as fully completing every level, completing a game blindfolded, or featuring multiple runners racing against one another to complete a game first. Video games run in Games Done Quick events include both retro and modern titles. The runs typically feature commentary from the runner(s) or experienced commentators, as well as donation messages read by an announcer.

Most of the popular runs feature video game glitches and discussion between the runner and the commentators, most frequently describing techniques or using observational humor and banter. Humor and banter is especially used for non-interactive or repetitive sequences that don't require the runner to use much or any skill. Donations from viewers may feature humorous comments that contain inside jokes among the speedrunning community, as well as more personal acknowledgments concerning donations. Because of the live broadcast and wider audience, runners and commentators are encouraged to refrain from using strong profanity and offensive behavior.

When donating, donors have the option to put their money towards a particular incentive. These incentives can be in the form of bonus speedruns, showcases of additional tricks or glitches, or an in-game decision such as naming the player character.

== History ==
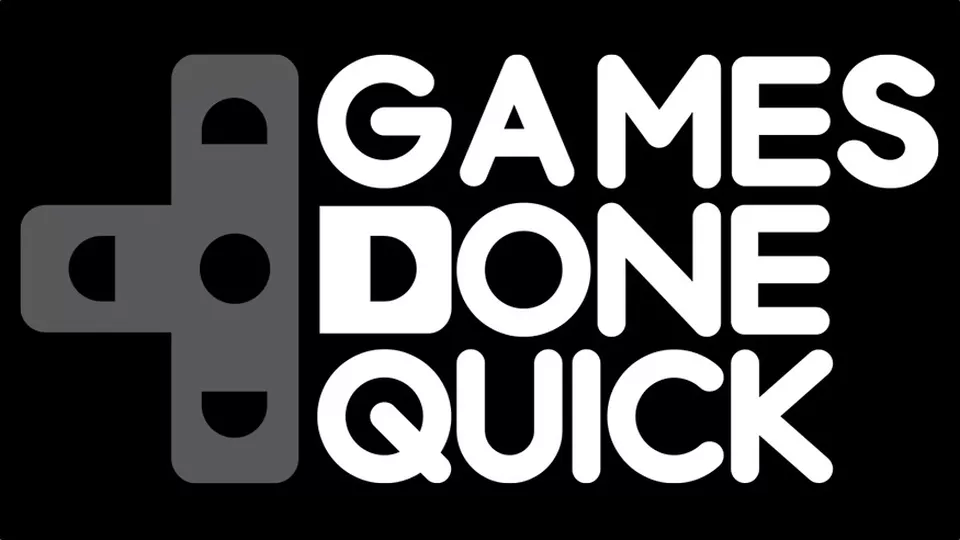
Games Done Quick's former logo, used until 2018

Writer and speedrunner Eric Koziel identifies two important precursors to Games Done Quick: the "Desert Bus for Hope" donation drive organized by LoadingReadyRun in November 2007, and a series of charity speedrun marathons held by TheSpeedGamers starting in March 2008.

Users of the site Speed Demos Archive decided to hold a charity marathon in January 2010, during MAGFest 8. It was themed around 8-bit and 16-bit video games and thus dubbed "Classic Games Done Quick" (after the 1990s speedrunning project Quake Done Quick). Internet connectivity problems at the MAGFest hotel forced SDA administrator Mike Uyama to relocate the event to his mother's residence, but it raised over $10,000 for CARE.

Following that initial success, the first Awesome Games Done Quick marathon was held in January 2011, expanding from two days to five days, incorporating newer games such as Halo and Portal, and raising more than $50,000 for the Prevent Cancer Foundation. The first Summer Games Done Quick was held in August 2011, raising $20,000 for the Organization for Autism Research. Since then, both Awesome Games Done Quick and Summer Games Done Quick have recurred annually, soon raising significantly larger amounts than these early marathons.

A one-off additional marathon was held in March 2011 to support victims of the earthquake and tsunami in Japan; Japan Relief Done Quick raised over $25,000. In addition, a one-off promotional event was held on March 20, 2015, to celebrate the 10th anniversary of the God of War franchise. Over the course of five hours, God of War Done Quick ended up raising $3,500 for The AbleGamers Foundation.

Due to the COVID-19 pandemic, the Summer 2020 marathon, both 2021 marathons, and the Winter 2022 marathon were held as virtual events. In-person attendance returned for SGDQ 2022 under strict social distancing, masking, and vaccine mandate protocol, with all attendees required to have a full series of COVID-19 vaccine and booster dose, while also continuing to intersperse remote runners alongside those present on-stage. The Winter AGDQ 2023 event was intended to be an in-person event held in Orlando, Florida, but was moved to a virtual event after controversies due to the Florida state government's stances on LGBT rights and COVID-19 (the state strictly prohibits vaccine mandates). Breaking the hotel contract carried significant financial consequences for the organization; GDQ Black In A Flash and events coordinator Vanessa "PleasantlyTwstd" B described it as "a make-or-break deal" that "set back any ambitious expansion because the budget was tight for the next couple of years," while Uyama noted that low attendance driven by Florida's legislation could have caused even greater financial losses had they proceeded, and GDQ director of operations Matt Merkle stated that the organization "was not going to risk attendee lives over money." Ahead of the event, Uyama announced that he would be stepping down from his role in GDQ after 13 years "to take care of my health and kind of focus on different activities". In February 2023, it was announced he had postponed his departure to cover for his successor's illness.

Over the course of its early years, GDQ faced criticism for permitting casual bigotry among runners and commentators, and its Twitch chat was largely unmoderated. Founder Mike Uyama later acknowledged his own limited awareness during this period, stating: "I didn't really have any knowledge of LGBTQ+ and queer spaces and proper representation... I remember it wasn't really until 2012 or 2013 that I even learned properly what a transgender person was." From 2016 through 2018, GDQ made a more concerted effort to address these issues. GDQ eventually adopted what director of operations Matt Merkle described as a zero-tolerance policy toward harassment, noting: "We decided quite a few years ago that we were going to have a zero-tolerance policy for various types of harassment... We had to ban a few people." GDQ also expanded its outreach to underrepresented groups through satellite organizations and dedicated programming such as Frame Fatales and its regular Hotfix streams.

Over time, a cultural tradition has emerged at GDQ events: donors, whose messages are read aloud during speedruns, began regularly signing off with the phrase "trans rights." This practice became so established that in-person audiences have come to respond by shouting "trans rights" back in unison, regardless of the time of day during the marathon.

Speedrunning records have been set at various GDQ marathons in games including Super Mario Galaxy 2, Superman 64 and Tony Hawk's Pro Skater 3.

== List of marathons ==
=== Awesome Games Done Quick (AGDQ) ===
Originally called Classic Games Done Quick (CGDQ), this annual marathon is held every year in early January. It raises money for the Prevent Cancer Foundation.

Dates	Venue (Note: No in-person venue refers to a virtual event where runners stream from their residences during the marathon.)	Amount raised	Notes
January 1–3, 2010	(planned) Hilton Alexandria Mark Center, Alexandria, Virginia, during MAGFest 8 (Note: One speedrun was completed at the Hilton in 2010 before the venue was changed, due to poor Internet upload issues.) (actual) private residence	$10,532	Charity fundraised for was CARE.
January 6–11, 2011	National 4-H Youth Conference Center, Chevy Chase, Maryland	$52,520	First event to be called Awesome Games Done Quick. Raised money for the Prevent Cancer Foundation.
January 4–9, 2012	National 4-H Youth Conference Center, Chevy Chase, Maryland	$149,045	
January 6–12, 2013	National 4-H Youth Conference Center, Chevy Chase, Maryland	$448,425	
January 5–11, 2014	Crowne Plaza Dulles, Herndon, Virginia	$1,031,666	First GDQ event to raise over $1 million
January 4–10, 2015	Hilton Washington Dulles, Herndon, Virginia	$1,576,085	
January 3–10, 2016	Hilton Washington Dulles, Herndon, Virginia	$1,216,309	
January 8–15, 2017	Hilton Washington Dulles, Herndon, Virginia	$2,222,791	First GDQ event to raise over $2 million, as well as the first GDQ event to raise over $1 million in a single day
January 7–14, 2018	Hilton Washington Dulles, Herndon, Virginia	$2,295,191	
January 6–13, 2019	Bethesda North Marriott Hotel & Conference Center, Rockville, Maryland	$2,425,791	
January 5–12, 2020	DoubleTree Hilton, Orlando, Florida	$3,164,002	Second GDQ event to raise over $3 million
January 3–10, 2021	No in-person venue	$2,739,612	Conducted as a virtual event with no central venue due to the COVID-19 pandemic
January 9–16, 2022	No in-person venue	$3,442,033	Conducted as a virtual event due to COVID-19. Current donation record set at a GDQ event.
January 8–15, 2023	No in-person venue	$2,672,553	Conducted as a virtual event due to COVID-19 and the cancellation of its venue contract.
January 14–21, 2024	Wyndham Grand Pittsburgh, Pittsburgh, Pennsylvania	$2,539,832	
January 5–12, 2025	Wyndham Grand Pittsburgh, Pittsburgh, Pennsylvania	$2,583,405	
January 4–11, 2026	Wyndham Grand Pittsburgh, Pittsburgh, Pennsylvania	$2,445,186	
January 3–10, 2027	Hilton Atlanta, Atlanta, Georgia		

=== Summer Games Done Quick (SGDQ) ===
Introduced in 2011 as a companion to AGDQ, this marathon is usually held in late June or early July and raises money for Doctors Without Borders. Since 2015, the event has typically been held in the Minneapolis–Saint Paul region.

Dates	Venue	Amount raised	Notes
August 4–6, 2011	A participant's residence in West Bountiful, Utah	$21,397	Charity fundraised for was the Organization for Autism Research.
May 24–28, 2012	A participant's residence in West Bountiful, Utah	$46,279	Charity fundraised for was the Organization for Autism Research.
July 25–30, 2013	Sheraton Denver Tech Center, Greenwood Village, Colorado	$257,181	Raised money for Doctors Without Borders (as have subsequent SGDQs).
June 22–28, 2014	Crowne Plaza Denver International Airport, Denver, Colorado	$718,235	$82,985 of the funds were raised through the SGDQ 2014 Bundle.
July 26 – August 2, 2015	Crowne Plaza St. Paul Riverfront, Saint Paul, Minnesota	$1,215,601	
July 3–9, 2016	Hilton Minneapolis Downtown, Minneapolis, Minnesota	$1,294,140	First SGDQ to raise more than the AGDQ of the same year
July 2–9, 2017	Minneapolis Marriott City Center, Minneapolis, Minnesota	$1,792,342	
June 24 – July 1, 2018	DoubleTree Hilton, Bloomington, Minnesota	$2,168,914	
June 23–30, 2019	DoubleTree Hilton, Bloomington, Minnesota	$3,039,596	First GDQ event to raise over $3 million, and first time an all-time GDQ donation record was set at SGDQ
August 16–23, 2020	No in-person venue	$2,345,786	Delayed from the original date, and conducted as a virtual event due to COVID-19
July 4–11, 2021	No in-person venue	$2,938,715	Conducted as a virtual event due to COVID-19
June 26 – July 3, 2022	DoubleTree Hilton, Bloomington, Minnesota	$3,053,827	First in-person GDQ event since the beginning of the COVID-19 pandemic
May 28 – June 4, 2023	Hilton Minneapolis Downtown, Minneapolis, Minnesota	$2,268,302	
June 30 – July 7, 2024	Hilton Minneapolis Downtown, Minneapolis, Minnesota	$2,576,741	
July 6–13, 2025	Hilton Minneapolis Downtown, Minneapolis, Minnesota	$2,464,026	
July 5–11, 2026	Hilton Minneapolis Downtown, Minneapolis, Minnesota	$2,409,821	
June 20–26, 2027	Hilton Minneapolis Downtown, Minneapolis, Minnesota		

=== Special marathons ===
Games Done Quick Express (GDQx) is an annual three-day marathon held at TwitchCon since 2018. There was no Games Done Quick Express event held in 2020 or 2021 due to the cancellation of TwitchCon those years, nor was there a Games Done Quick Express event held during the 2022 TwitchCon.

Frame Fatales is a week-long marathon featuring only women and non-binary runners. It started in 2019 as a four-day event and started fundraising for the Malala Fund in 2020. As of 2022, the event has been held twice a year in February–March and August–September as Frost Fatales and Flame Fatales, respectively.

Marathon	Dates	Venue	Charity	Amount raised	Notes
Japan Relief Done Quick	April 7–10, 2011	No in-person venue	Doctors Without Borders	$25,800	A marathon to support victims of the 2011 Tōhoku earthquake and tsunami
Speedrun Spooktacular	October 26–29, 2012	No in-person venue	Lindsey King	$9,733	A marathon to help medical bills for Lindsey King, an artist for Speed Demos Archive
God of War Done Quick	March 20, 2015	Santa Monica Studio	AbleGamers	$3,500+	A special event at Santa Monica Studio as part of the 10-year anniversary of the God of War franchise
Harvey Relief Done Quick	September 1–3, 2017	No in-person venue	Houston Food Bank	$229,455	A marathon to support victims of Hurricane Harvey in Texas
Games Done Quick Express 2018	October 26–28, 2018	San Jose Convention Center	10 charities (Note: Charities at Games Done Quick Express 2018 included: AbleGamers, American Foundation for Suicide Prevention, Call of Duty Endowment, Direct Relief, Doctors Without Borders, Extra Life, Make-A-Wish Foundation, Save the Children, St. Jude Children's Research Hospital, and To Write Love on Her Arms.)	$139,879	
Games Done Quick Express 2019	September 27–29, 2019	San Diego Convention Center	AbleGamers	$152,595	
Classic Games Done Quick 10th Anniversary	December 27–29, 2019	No in-person venue	N/A	N/A	A marathon replicating the schedule of the first event held in January 2010 to celebrate 10 years of Games Done Quick
Frost Fatales 2020	February 23–29, 2020	No in-person venue	Malala Fund	$54,287	A marathon dedicated to women in speedrunning, running 8 hours a day
Corona Relief Done Quick	April 17–19, 2020	No in-person venue	Direct Relief	$403,632	A marathon to help improve the health and lives of people affected by the COVID-19 pandemic
Tony Hawk's Pro Skater 1 + 2 Launch Celebration	September 4, 2020	No in-person venue	The Trevor Project	$4,434	A marathon celebrating the release of Tony Hawk's Pro Skater 1 + 2
Fleet Fatales 2020	November 15–21, 2020	No in-person venue	Malala Fund	$81,396	An all-women speedrunning event
Flame Fatales 2021	August 15–21, 2021	No in-person venue	Malala Fund	$127,266	An all-women speedrunning event
Frost Fatales 2022	February 27 – March 5, 2022	No in-person venue	Malala Fund	$132,982	An all-women speedrunning event
Flame Fatales 2022	August 21–27, 2022	No in-person venue	Malala Fund	$135,512	An all-women speedrunning event
Frost Fatales 2023	February 26 – March 5, 2023	No in-person venue	Malala Fund	$153,417	An all-women speedrunning event
Flame Fatales 2023	August 13–20, 2023	No in-person venue	Malala Fund	$110,983	An all-women speedrunning event
Games Done Quick Express 2023	October 20–22, 2023	Las Vegas Convention Center	AbleGamers	$36,060	
Frost Fatales 2024	March 3–10, 2024	No in-person venue	National Women's Law Center	$155,267	An all-women speedrunning event
Flame Fatales 2024	August 18–25, 2024	No in-person venue	Malala Fund	$118,792	An all-women speedrunning event
Speedrun Stage @ PAX West 24	August 30 – September 2, 2024	Seattle Convention Center	N/A	N/A	A marathon hosted by Games Done Quick at PAX West 2024
Games Done Quick Express 2024	September 20–22, 2024	San Diego Convention Center	AbleGamers	$36,412	
Games Done Hitless 2024	October 4–6, 2024	No in-person venue	American Heart Association	$16,181	A marathon showcasing hitless challenge speedruns
Disaster Relief Done Quick 2024	October 11–13, 2024	No in-person venue	Direct Relief	$45,466	A marathon to support recovery efforts after Hurricane Helene and Hurricane Milton
Back to Black 2025	February 6–10, 2025	No in-person venue	Race Forward	$44,025	An all-black speedrunning event
Frost Fatales 2025	March 9–16, 2025	No in-person venue	National Women's Law Center	$151,818	An all-women speedrunning event
Speedrun Stage @ PAX East 25	May 8–11, 2025	Boston Convention and Exhibition Center	N/A	N/A	A marathon hosted by Games Done Quick at PAX East 2025
Speedrun Stage @ PAX West 25	August 29 – September 1, 2025	Seattle Convention Center	N/A	N/A	A marathon hosted by Games Done Quick at PAX West 2025
Flame Fatales 2025	September 7–14, 2025	No in-person venue	Malala Fund	$154,388	An all-women speedrunning event
Games Done Quick Express 2025	October 17–19, 2025	San Diego Convention Center	World Central Kitchen	$31,176	
Games Done Queer	October 31 – November 2, 2025	No in-person venue	Lambda Legal Defense Fund	$53,841	An event celebrating LGBTQIA+ runners and communities
Back to Black 2026	February 5–8, 2026	No in-person venue	Race Forward	$53,496	An all-black speedrunning event
Frost Fatales 2026	March 8–14, 2026	No in-person venue	National Women's Law Center	$153,745	An all-women speedrunning event
Speedrun Stage @ PAX East 26	March 26–29, 2026	Boston Convention and Exhibition Center	N/A	N/A	A marathon hosted by Games Done Quick at PAX East 2026
gamescom GDQ	August 28–30, 2026	Konrad-Adenauer-Saal, Koelnmesse	Gaming4Democracy	€18,025	A marathon hosted by Games Done Quick at gamescom in Cologne, Germany. First GDQ event held outside the US.
Speedrun Stage @ PAX West 26	September 4–7, 2026	Seattle Convention Center	N/A	N/A	A marathon hosted by Games Done Quick at PAX West 2026
Flame Fatales 2026	September 13–20, 2026	No in-person venue	Malala Fund	$134,445	An all-women speedrunning event
Games Done Hitless 2026	October 23–25, 2026	No in-person venue	Doctors Without Borders	$13,080	A marathon showcasing hitless challenge speedruns
Games Done Quick Express 2026	November 13–15, 2026	San Diego Convention Center	World Central Kitchen	$15,096	

== Controversies ==
As GDQ events have become more popular, there have been several controversies, with players and commentators being banned, and with the stream chat having to be muted. GDQ has noted they advise attendees to avoid "topics of conversation that are polarizing or controversial in nature" as well as avoiding harassing other players. Some attendees have been banned for making inappropriate comments, although there are criticisms that some of the bans may be without merit.

In 2017, a commentator, PvtCinnamonBun, on a speedrun of the game Ape Escape 2 for AGDQ 2017, was banned from all future events for supposedly wearing a "Make America Great Again" (MAGA) hat on stream shortly after Donald Trump's election to the United States presidency. The incident occurred during GDQ's broader transition between 2016 and 2018 toward stricter conduct policies; the Aftermath outlet noted that prior to this shift, runners who had brought a MAGA hat to AGDQ or behaved in flagrantly sexist fashion, "among other standouts from years-long histories of edgelord behavior, were able to attend events and gain footholds in the scene." However, according to Kotaku, PvtCinnamonBun's ban was revoked since it was not actually a MAGA hat, but GDQ officials banned him again for supposedly unplugging a power strip cable. Another speedrunner, Cyberdemon531, was also banned from the event for owning the MAGA hat in the first place.

In 2018, speedrunner "BubblesDelFuego", who speedruns Dark Souls and Fallout 4, was banned from all future GDQ events after sharing edible medicinal cannabis with a friend, which resulted in that friend having a panic attack and being transported to the hospital by paramedics. Bubbles consumed edible cannabis for chronic pain resulting from complications with Hodgkin lymphoma. Bubbles told Kotaku that although he understood why he was banned, he believed that the GDQ "enforcement" staff abused their power and were misinformed about tetrahydrocannabinol (THC), the active chemical in cannabis.

At SGDQ 2019, speedrunner "QuinnAce" (formerly "ConnorAce") used a spliced run to illegitimately claim the world record on Clustertruck for the "NoAbility%" category, depriving the legitimate record holder from being invited. The run was treated with suspicion due to it not being submitted officially to speedrun.com, with the video being unlisted on YouTube prior to QuinnAce's acceptance into SGDQ. In October 2019, QuinnAce's run was exposed by the YouTuber documentarian Apollo Legend.

At AGDQ 2020, various runners, including "Luzbelheim" (or "Luz"), were scheduled to run a relay playthrough of Final Fantasy VIII. Hours before, however, Luz's Twitter bio went viral for his comment that he hates "feminazism", identifies as "deminonbinary", and he uses the pronouns "luz/luz". Other online news publications negatively reacted to GDQ organizers allowing Luz to play in the relay playthrough. Luz was given a ban without details about its length.

At SGDQ 2022, speedrunner "Mekarazium" admitted that he faked a run of Metal Gear Rising: Revengeance Blade Wolf DLC. The game was played remotely, unlike most of the other games at the event, and the DLC was a donation incentive. While the main game was played live by Mekarazium, the DLC was pre-recorded. Viewers quickly noted discrepancies with the run. Mekarazium admitted to faking the run and was banned from future GDQ events.

On July 12, 2026—the day following the conclusion of SGDQ 2026—a Hotfix show was held to mark the 30th anniversary of the Metal Slug franchise, with sponsorship from its publisher SNK. The stream faced criticism due to the current ownership of SNK by the Misk Foundation—an entity tied to Saudi Arabian Crown Prince Mohammed bin Salman—as community members considered it to be hypocritical for GDQ to be accepting sponsorships tied to a country known for its poor human rights record (including suppression of women's and LGBT rights). Amid the criticism, GDQ halted the stream and issued an apology, stating that the sponsorship conflicted with its values of inclusivity, and that it would "review and strengthen our process for evaluating future sponsors and partners, including closer examination of companies’ ownership, to make sure they're aligned with our values."
