= Speedrunning =

Act of playing a video game as quickly as possible

Speedrun of a SuperTux level

Speedrunning is the act of playing a video game, or section of a video game, with the goal of completing it as fast as possible. Speedrunning often involves following planned routes, which may incorporate sequence breaking and exploit glitches that allow sections to be skipped or completed more quickly than intended. Tool-assisted speedrunning (TAS) is a subcategory of speedrunning that uses emulation software or additional tools to create a precisely controlled sequence of inputs or to slow down the game to perfect movements.

Many online communities revolve around speedrunning specific games; community leaderboard rankings for individual games form the primary competitive metric for speedrunning. Racing between two or more speedrunners is also a popular form of competition. Videos and livestreams of speedruns are shared via the internet on sites such as YouTube and Twitch. Speedruns are sometimes showcased at marathon events, which are gaming conventions that feature multiple people performing speedruns in a variety of games.

== History ==
=== Early examples ===
Speedrunning has been a part of video games since the early days of the medium, similar to the chasing of high scores, though it did not achieve broad interest until 1993. Some groundwork for what would become modern speedrunning was established by id Software during the development for Wolfenstein 3D (1992), although prior games such as Metroid (1986) and Prince of Persia (1989) encouraged speedrunning by noting a player's time upon meeting certain metrics, including completion of the game. Wolfenstein 3D recorded a "par time" statistic which was based on John Romero's personal records for each level. Romero's best level times were also printed in the official hint book, which was available via the same mail-order system used to distribute the game at the time. His intention was that players would attempt to beat his times.

=== 1993–2003: Doom and Quake demos, early Internet communities ===
The development of a strong speedrunning community is considered to have originated with the 1993 computer game Doom. The game retained the "par time" mechanic from Wolfenstein and included a feature that allowed players to record and play back gameplay using files called demos (also known as game replays). Demos were lightweight files that could be shared more easily than video files on Internet bulletin board systems at the time. Internally, in January 1994, University of Waterloo student Christina Norman created a File Transfer Protocol server dedicated to compiling demos, named the LMP Hall of Fame (after the .lmp file extension used by Doom demos). The LMP Hall of Fame inspired the creation of the Doom Honorific Titles by Frank Stajano, a catalogue of titles that a player could obtain by beating certain challenges in the game. The Doom speedrunning community emerged in November 1994, when Simon Widlake created COMPET-N, a website hosting leaderboards dedicated to ranking completion times of Doom's single-player levels.

A "grenade jump" is used in Quake in order to jump over a large lava pit.

In 1996, id Software released Quake as a successor to the Doom series. Like its predecessor, Quake had a demo-recording feature and drew attention from speedrunners. In April 1997, Nolan "Radix" Pflug created Nightmare Speed Demos (NSD), a website for tracking Quake speedruns. In June 1997, Pflug released a full-game speedrun demo of Quake called Quake Done Quick, which introduced speedrunning to a broader audience. Quake speedruns were notable for their breadth of movement techniques, including "bunny hopping," a method of gaining speed also present in future shooting games like Counter-Strike and Team Fortress. In April 1998, NSD merged with another demo-hosting website to create Speed Demos Archive.

=== 2003–present: Speed Demos Archive and video sharing ===
For five years, Speed Demos Archive hosted exclusively Quake speedruns, but in 2003 it published a 100% speedrun of Metroid Prime done by Pflug. Six months later, SDA began accepting runs from all games. Unlike its predecessor websites, SDA did not compile leaderboards for their games; they displayed only the fastest speedrun of each game. Until SDA's expansion into games other than Quake in 2004, speedrun video submissions were primarily sent to early video game record-keeper Twin Galaxies. The videos were often never publicly released, creating verifiability concerns that SDA aimed to address. It was often impossible to determine what strategies had gone into setting these records, hindering the development of speedrunning techniques. Sites dedicated to speedrunning, including game-specific sites, began to establish the subculture around speedrunning. These sites were not only used for sharing runs but also to collaborate and share tips to improve times, leading to collaborative efforts to continuously improve speedrunning records on certain games.

In 2003, a video demonstrating a TAS of Super Mario Bros. 3 garnered widespread attention on the internet; many speedrunners cite this as their first introduction to the hobby. It was performed and published by a Japanese user named Morimoto. The video was lacking context to indicate that it was a TAS, so many people believed it to be an actual human performance. It drew criticism from viewers who felt "cheated" when Morimoto later explained the process by which he created the video and apologized for the confusion. In December 2003, after seeing Morimoto's TAS, a user named Bisqwit created TASVideos (initially named NESVideos), a site dedicated to displaying tool-assisted speedruns.

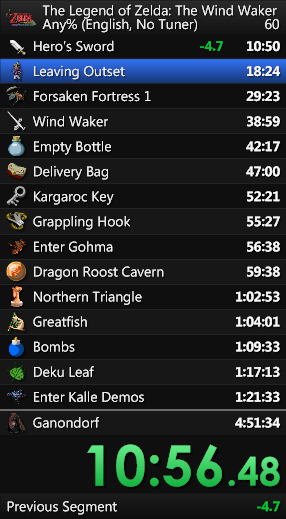
LiveSplit, an open-source speedrunning timer showing the current pace in a speedrun of The Legend of Zelda: The Wind Waker

The creation of video-sharing and streaming websites in the late 2000s and early 2010s contributed to an increase in the accessibility and popularity of speedrunning. In 2005, the creation of YouTube enabled speedrunners to upload and share videos of speedruns and discuss strategies on the SDA forums. Twitch, a livestreaming website centered around video gaming, was launched in 2011. The advent of livestreaming made for easier verification and preservation of speedruns, and some speedrunners believe it is responsible for a shift towards collaboration among members of the community. In 2014, Speedrun.com was created, which had less stringent submission guidelines than SDA and was intended to centralize speedrun leaderboards for many different games. Speedrunners' move towards using Speedrun.com and social media platforms like Skype and Discord contributed to SDA's relevance waning in the 2010s. Various programs were created to assist speedrunning, such as speedrunning timers that show the current and best time of the game's sections, comparing the two and highlighting the differences.

== Methodology ==
=== Gameplay strategies ===
Speedrunners often find unconventional routes that save time.

Routing is a fundamental process in speedrunning. Routing is the act of developing an optimal sequence of actions and stages in a video game. A route may involve skipping one or more important items or sections. Skipping a part of a video game that is normally required for progression is referred to as sequence breaking, a term first used in reference to the 2002 action-adventure game Metroid Prime. Video game glitches may be used to achieve sequence breaks, or may be used for other purposes such as skipping cutscenes and increasing the player's speed or damage output. Some people, called glitch-hunters, choose to focus on finding glitches that will be useful to speedrunners. In some games, arbitrary code execution exploits may be possible, allowing players to write their own code into the game's memory. Several speedruns use a "credits warp", a category of glitch that causes the game's credits sequence to play, which may require arbitrary code execution. The use of glitches and sequence breaks in speedruns was historically not allowed, per the rules of Twin Galaxies' early leaderboards. When speedrunning moved away from Twin Galaxies towards independent online leaderboards, their use became increasingly common.

=== Tool-assisted speedruns ===
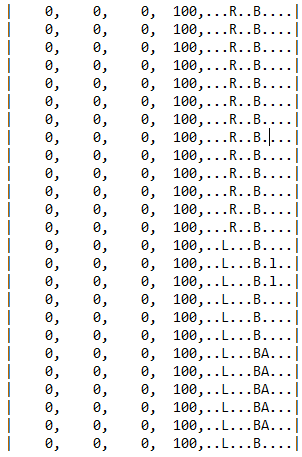
Example tool-assisted speedrun input file, showing which buttons will be pressed at which point in the sequence

A tool-assisted speedrun (TAS) is a speedrun that uses emulation software and tools to create a "theoretically perfect playthrough". According to TASVideos, common examples of tools include advancing the game frame by frame to play the game more precisely, retrying parts of the run using savestates, and hex editing. These tools are designed to remove restrictions imposed by human reflexes and allow for optimal gameplay. The run is recorded as a series of controller inputs intended to be fed back to the game in sequence. Although generally recorded on an emulator, TASes can be played back on original console hardware by sending inputs into the console's controller ports, a process known as console verification (as some exploits are possible on emulation but not console). TASes can also perform inputs that, while recognized by the console or emulator, are impossible to achieve with a standard controller, such as registering left and right inputs simultaneously on a Nintendo Entertainment System, which cannot be performed with standard unmodified NES controllers. To differentiate them from tool-assisted speedruns, unassisted speedruns are sometimes referred to as real-time attack (RTA) speedruns. Due to the lack of a human playing the game in real time, TASes are not considered to be in competition with RTA speedruns.

=== Categorization and ranking ===
Speedruns are divided into various categories that impose additional limitations on a runner. It is common for category restrictions to require a certain amount of content to be completed in the game. Each video game may have its own speedrun categories, but some categories are popular irrespective of game. The most common are:

- Any%, which involves getting to the end as fast as possible with no qualifier.
- 100%, which requires full completion of a game. This may entail obtaining all items or may use some other metric.
- Low%, the opposite of 100%, which requires the player to beat the game while completing the minimum amount possible.
- Glitchless, which restricts the player from performing any glitches during the speedrun.
- No Major Glitches, which involves beating the game as fast as possible while not using any "game breaking" glitches.

Speedrunners compete in these categories by ranking times on online leaderboards. According to Wired, the definitive website for speedrun leaderboards is Speedrun.com. As of July 2021, the site hosts leaderboards for over 20,000 video games. Runners usually record footage of their speedruns for accurate timing and verification, and may include a timer in their videos. They often use timers that keep track of splits—the time between the start of the run and the completion of some section or objective. Verification is usually done by leaderboard moderators who review submissions and determine the validity of individual speedruns.

== Community ==
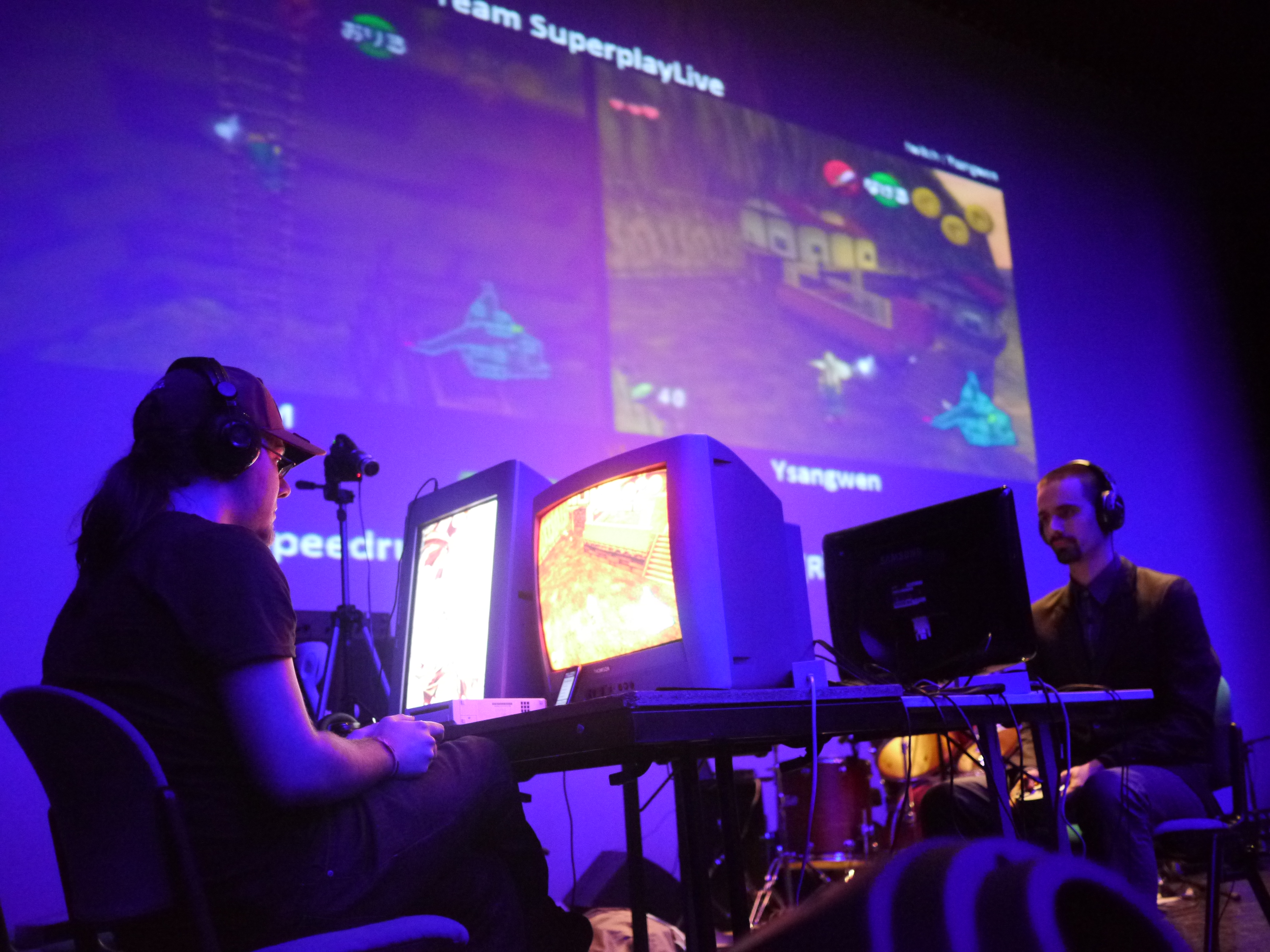
Two speedrunners playing The Legend of Zelda: Ocarina of Time at Mang'Azur 2013

According to many speedrunners, community is an important aspect of the hobby. Matt Merkle, director of operations at Games Done Quick, says that speedrunners "value the cooperation the community encourages," and many speedrunners have said that their mental health has improved because of their involvement in the community. Erica Lenti, writing for Wired, said a sense of community is vital to speedrunning because it motivates players and aids in the development of routes and tricks used in speedruns, and Milan Jacevic highlighted "years of research" and collective community efforts that contribute to world records.

Speedrunners use media-sharing sites like YouTube and Twitch to share videos and livestreams of speedruns. The speedrunning community is divided into many sub-communities focused on speedrunning specific games. These sub-communities can form their own independent leaderboards and communicate about their games using Discord. Many communities have used the centralized leaderboard hosting site Speedrun.com since its founding in 2014.

=== Marathons ===
Speedrunning marathons, a form of gaming convention, feature a series of speedruns by multiple speedrunners. While many marathons are held worldwide, the largest event is Games Done Quick, a semiannual marathon held in the United States. As of January 2022, it has raised over $37 million for charity organizations since its inception in 2010. The largest marathon in Europe is Speedons, held in France. Both events broadcast the speedruns on Twitch and raise money for various charity organizations. Speedruns at marathons are done in one attempt and often have accompanying commentary. Many people consider marathons to be important to runners and spectators in the speedrunning community. Peter Marsh, writing for the Australian Broadcasting Corporation, says that the Games Done Quick events provide an inclusive space for women and the LGBTQ community in contrast to the related cultures of gaming and Twitch streaming. Alex Miller of Wired says the events have played an important role in connecting people and supporting international humanitarian organization Médecins Sans Frontières during the COVID-19 pandemic.

=== Speedrun races ===
Races between two or more speedrunners are a common competition format. They require players to be skilled at recovering from setbacks during a speedrun because they cannot start over. Occasionally, races are featured at marathons; a 4-person Super Metroid race is a popular recurring event at Games Done Quick marathons. The Global Speedrun Association (GSA) have organized head-to-head tournaments for multiple games, including Celeste, Super Mario 64, and Super Mario Odyssey. In 2019, GSA organized an in-person speedrun race event called PACE. Their efforts have drawn criticism from some speedrunners who believe that they "undermine the community spirit", citing cash prizes as incentives to avoid collaboration with other speedrunners and ignore games without prize money. Video game randomizers—ROM hacks that randomly shuffle item locations and other in-game content—are popular for speedrun races as well. Tournaments and other events have been organized for randomizer races, and they have been featured at speedrun marathons.

== Cheating ==
=== Methods ===
==== Splicing ====
Splicing is by far the most popular cheating method in speedrunning. Here, a speedrun is not recorded continuously, as is usually the case, but instead composed of various video snippets recorded at different times, sometimes with gameplay stolen from TAS composers or legitimate players.

At SGDQ 2019, speedrunner "ConnorAce" used a spliced run to illegitimately claim the world record on Clustertruck for the "NoAbility%" category, depriving the legitimate record holder from being invited to the event. The run was treated with suspicion due to it not being submitted officially to Speedrun.com, with the video being unlisted on YouTube prior to ConnorAce's acceptance into SGDQ. In October 2019, ConnorAce's run was exposed by the YouTube documentarian Apollo Legend.

In a typical case, splicing allows difficult segments to be repeated to perfection and edited together afterwards into one seemingly continuous effort, which can sometimes dramatically reduce the amount of time needed to grind out a comparable score. However, a spliced run is not considered cheating if it is announced to be a multi-segment run upon submission; for example, this community-made multi-segment compilation for Super Mario Bros.

==== TASbotting ====
When 'TASbotting', the player records their controller inputs as a tool-assisted run in an external device in order to then have this device reproduce the inputs on a real console. As with splicing, the inputs of individual segments can be combined and, as is usual for tool-assisted runs, inputs can be made frame by frame. As long as these inputs are authentic and seem realistic for a human being, such manipulations are much more difficult to detect in the resulting video product than splicing. If, on the other hand, a TAS is not outputted on the original hardware but, as usual, on emulators, it can sometimes be alleged from the resulting video that such auxiliary programs were used; additionally, some emulators never perfectly imitate the desired hardware, which can cause synchronization issues when replayed on a console.

==== Modifying the timer or playback speed ====
Modifying game timers, especially on computer games, is another common method to improve one's recorded times. However, this is a very noticeable manipulation, especially in highly competitive areas, since the speedruns in the upper area of leaderboards are repeatedly analyzed by other players in order to check their legitimacy and playback reproducibility, including a temporal check known as "retiming". This often reveals discrepancies between one's recording time and a speedrun in the leaderboards.

Another method, a variation of splicing, includes speeding up cutscenes or compressing transitional black space. Again, such methods are likely to be detected by a speedrun moderator, although some games, especially where PC speed can have an effect, may actually vary depending on hardware.

Finally, another common cheating method is to play the game using frame-by-frame advancement or in slow motion, which is similar to normal tool-assisted speedrunning but without the ability to redo inputs. Playing in slow motion is often effective for games that require very precise movements.

==== Modifying in-game files ====
While it is often possible to use traditional cheats such as a GameShark to increase character speed, strength, health, etc., such cheats are generally quite easy for an experienced moderator to detect, even when applied subtly. However, the modification of internal files to improve RNG can often be much more difficult to detect.

One of the most infamous examples of file modification was several cheated runs by the speedrunner Dream in 2020, whose luck was considered so extreme in a series of Minecraft speedruns that they were considered exceedingly unlikely to have been done without cheating (with an approximately 1 in 20 sextillion chance of occurring, as estimated by Matt Parker from Numberphile) by both the moderators at Speedrun.com and various YouTubers, such as Karl Jobst and Matt Parker, whose videos on Dream gained a combined 5.7 million and 6.5 million views, respectively, as of January 2024. (Note: Atrributed to multiple sources:) Dream later admitted to the runs being cheated about five months after his runs were rejected, although he claimed he did not know he was using a modified version of the game. Nearly two years later, the player who helped uncover Dream's cheated runs, MinecrAvenger, was also found to be using similar luck manipulation in late 2022.

==== Lying about times ====
While all of the aforementioned methods are deceptive in nature, the simplest way of cheating is merely to lie about a time. One of the most infamous cases of this was done by Todd Rogers. Several of his records have come under scrutiny for being seemingly impossible or lacking sufficient proof. In 2002, Robert Mruczek, then chief referee at Twin Galaxies, officially rescinded Todd's record time in Barnstorming after other players pointed out that his time of 32.04 seconds did not appear to be possible, even when the game was hacked to remove all obstacles. Upon further investigation, Twin Galaxies referees were unable to find independent verification for this time, having instead been relying on erroneous information from Activision.

As listed on the Twin Galaxies leaderboard until January 2018, Rogers's record in the 1980 Activision game Dragster was a time of 5.51 seconds from 1982. At the time, Activision verified high scores by Polaroid. According to Rogers, after he submitted a photo of this time, he was called by Activision, who asked him to verify how he achieved such a score, because they had programmed a 'perfect run' of the game and were unable to achieve better than a 5.54. The game's programmer David Crane would later confirm that he had a vague recollection of programming test runs, but did not remember the results. In 2012, Todd received a Guinness World Record for the longest-standing video game score record, for his 1982 Dragster record. In 2017, a speedrunner named Eric "Omnigamer" Koziel disassembled the game's code and concluded that the fastest possible time was 5.57 seconds. With a tick rate of 0.03 seconds, the record claim is two ticks faster than Omnigamer's data and one tick faster than the reported Activision 'perfect run'.

=== Cheat detection ===
In order to prevent most of these methods, some games require a video of the hands on the controller or keyboard ("handcam"), in addition to the screen recording, so that game-specific moderators in charge of authenticating a submission can ensure that the inputs are really done in the specified combination and by a human. Other methods include forensic audio analysis, which is a common method for detecting telltale signs of video splicing; this is why runs without high-quality audio streams are often rejected on speedrun boards.

Additional detection methods are the use of mathematics (as in the aforementioned Dream case) or human moderation of suspicious inputs (in games which record them such as Doom and TrackMania). Cheat detection software created for TrackMania was used to analyze over 400,000 replays and isolate a handful of cheaters, leading to hundreds of world records being determined to have been cheated using slowdown tools. This included those of Burim "riolu" Fejza, who was signed to the eSports team Nordavind (now known as 00 Nation) before being dropped following the scandal.

== See also ==
- Challenge run
- Donkey Kong high score competition
- European Speedrunner Assembly
- Games Done Quick
- God's algorithm
- Nintendo World Championships
- Running with Speed
- Time attack
- Wikipedia speedrun
