= Comparison of hex editors =

The following is a comparison of notable hex editors.

== General ==
	GUI	Console	Software license	Latest stable version	Latest release date	Windows	Macintosh	Linux
HxD	Yes	No	Proprietary freeware	2.5.0.0	February 11, 2021	Win95, WinNT4 and up	No	No
010 Editor	Yes	No	Proprietary	17.0.1	November 4, 2026	Yes	Yes	Yes
beye	No	Yes	GPL-2.0-only or GPL-3.0-only	6.1.0	December 12, 2009	Yes	Yes	Yes
Cheat Engine	Yes	No	Proprietary freeware	7.2	August 14, 2021	Yes	Yes, ver. 6.2	No
GNU Emacs	Yes	Yes	GPL-3.0-or-later	29.1	July 30, 2023	Yes	Yes	Yes
FlexHex	Yes	No	Proprietary freeware for personal use	2.7	October 12, 2018	Windows XP and up	No	No
Hiew	No	Yes	Proprietary	8.81	March 24, 2024	Yes	No	No
ImHex	Yes	Yes	GPL-2.0-only	1.37.4	February 26, 2025	Yes	Yes	Yes
VEDIT	Yes	Yes	Proprietary	6.24.2	Jan 1, 2015	Yes	No	No
UltraEdit	Yes	No	Proprietary	26.10 (Windows); 18.0 (Linux / Mac OS X)	May 7, 2019; January 2, 2018	Yes	Yes	Yes
WinHex	Yes	No	Proprietary	21.0	December 13, 2023	Win95 and up	No	No
Vim	Yes	Yes	Vim	9.1.0	January 2, 2024	Yes	Yes	Yes

== Features ==
	Maximum file size	Partial file loading	Disk sector editing	Process memory editing	Data inspector	Bit editing	Insert/ delete bytes	Character encodings^{(ao)}	Search Unicode	File formats	Disassembler	File compare	Find in files	Bookmarks	Macro	Text editor
HxD	8 EiB	Yes	Windows 9x/NT and up	Yes	Yes	Yes	Yes	ANSI, ASCII, OEM, EBCDIC, Macintosh	Yes	No	Individual instructions only	Yes	No	Yes	No	No
010 Editor	8 EiB	Yes	Yes	WinNT only	Yes	Yes	Yes	ANSI, OEM, Unicode, UTF-8, EBCDIC, Custom	Yes	330	Yes	Yes	Yes	Yes	Yes	Yes
beye	8 PiB	Yes	No			Yes	Yes	ANSI, EBCDIC, ASCII, Macintosh	Yes	29	AVR, Java, x86, i386, x86-64, ARM/XScale, PowerPC, PPC64			Yes	No	
Emacs	2.3 EB	No	Unknown	No	No	No	No	Yes	Yes	Unknown	No	No	Unknown	Unknown	Yes	Yes
FlexHex	unlimited	Yes	Yes		Yes	Yes	Yes	ANSI, OEM, UTF-16	Yes	2	No	Yes	No	Yes		No
Hiew	unlimited	Yes	WinNT only		Yes	Yes	Yes	ASCII, OEM, Unicode, custom	Yes	No	x86, x86-64, MMX, SSE 4.2, 3DNow! - all assembler, ARM		Yes	Yes	Yes	
VEDIT	Standard, 2 GiB, Pro 64, unlimited	Yes	DOS version only		No	Yes	Yes	ANSI, OEM, EBCDIC, ASCII, custom	No	No	No	Yes	Yes	Yes	Yes	Yes
UltraEdit	>4 GiB	Yes	No	No	No	No	Yes	ANSI, OEM, EBCDIC, ASCII, Mac, Unix, UTF-8	Yes	No	No	Yes	Yes	Yes		
WinHex	unlimited	Yes	Yes		Yes	Yes	Yes	Partial support of these formats: ANSI, UNICODE, OEM, UTF-8/UTF-16, EBCDIC, ASCII	Yes	44	Only x86 Intel opcodes	Yes	Yes and replace		Yes	No
vim	Limited by RAM	No	No	No	No	Yes	Yes	ASCII, ISO-8859, DOS (OEM), UTF-8, UTF-16, partial EBCDIC (compilation required), unicode	Yes	No	No	Yes	No	Plug-in	Yes	Yes
ImHex	Unlimited	Yes	Yes	Yes	Yes	Yes	Yes	ANSI, OEM, Unicode, UTF-8, EBCDIC, Shift-JIS, Custom	Yes	143	Yes	Yes	Yes	Yes	Yes	No
	Maximum file size	Partial file loading	Disk sector editing	Process memory editing	Data inspector	Bit editing	Insert/ delete bytes	Character encodings^{(ao)}	Search Unicode	File formats	Disassembler	File compare	Find in files	Bookmarks	Macro	Text editor

== See also ==
- Comparison of HTML editors
- Comparison of integrated development environments
- Comparison of text editors
- Comparison of word processors

== Notes ==
ao: ANSI is the Windows character set, OEM is the DOS character set. Both are based on ASCII.
