= Pannekoek (disambiguation) =

Anton Pannekoek (1873-1960) was a Dutch astronomer and political theorist.

Pannekoek may also refer to:

- Pannenkoek, a Dutch style of pancake
- Pannekoek (crater), a lunar impact crater
- pannenkoek2012, a YouTuber and Super Mario 64 player

== See also ==
- Panne (disambiguation)
