= List of unofficial Mario media =

Unofficial media based on the Mario franchise

Unlicensed developers and fans have created unofficial media relating to the Mario franchise. Such media include video games, ROM hacks, level editors, live action adaptations, and animations.

Due in-part to the franchise's popularity, some of these unlicensed works have received critical attention. In September 2016, Nintendo issued over 500 DMCA takedown requests for various fan games hosted at Game Jolt based on their intellectual properties. All of these games have been taken down. While some of these pieces of media have been deemed to fall under fair use, many have not, with the specifics of rulings often depending on the country in which the notice for copyright infringement was given.

== Video games ==
=== Console games ===
Several unofficial, and unlicensed, Mario games and game mods have been released for various video game consoles.

- Kaizo Mario World, also known as Asshole Mario, is a series of three ROM hacks of the 1990 Super Nintendo Entertainment System video game Super Mario World, notable for deliberately breaking normal rules of "accepted" level design and featuring extreme difficulty. It became the namesake for Kaizo, a genre of Mario games modified for intense difficulty.
- Super Dram World is series of three Super Mario World ROM hacks created by American ROM hacker PangaeaPanga and named after speedrunner Dram55, designed for high difficulty.
- Super Panga World is a ROM hack of Super Mario World created by Linkdeadx2 and dedicated to PangaeaPanga.
- Dian Shi Ma Li (Chinese: 電視瑪琍; pinyin: Diànshì Mǎlì; trans. "TV Mari[o]"), translated to English as Big TV Mary Bar and also known as Mario Lottery, TV Mario, Li Ma Shin Dian on newer releases is an unlicensed video game for the Family Computer made by Bit Corporation and released by Fiver Firm (五合企業有限公司) and Fortran, under their first name "Namco Corporation". It is based on the Taiwanese slot machine game Xiǎo Mǎ Lì (小瑪琍; "Small Mari[o]"), where features a character resembling Mario with an F on his cap, who has become known as "Fortran" based on hidden text discovered in the ROM. The game is a roulette wheel/slot machine – different buttons control the betting, and each button produces a musical note. Landing on the coin produces a message in Chinglish: "PUSH START TO RICH". It became an internet meme when users created fad videos on YouTube.
- 7 Grand Dad, also known as Primitive Mario VII, is a bootleg ROM hack of The Flintstones: The Rescue of Dino & Hoppy in which Fred Flintstone's head is replaced with that of Mario. The bootleg is notorious for its nonsensical title, as well as its lack of effort in removing Flintstones elements such as the characters and theme song. The game has become an internet meme due to Twitch streamer "Vargskelethor" Joel's shocked reaction to the ROM hack, and parody video game music collective SiIvaGunner's bait-and-switch remixes of the game's soundtrack.
- New Super Mario Land is a port of Super Mario Land to the Super NES, made by an unknown developer. It features graphics and music reminiscent of New Super Mario Bros. According to its developer, it was made from the ground up, using an assembler and tools for graphics and music. It was originally created as a gift for the developer's "Nintendo-loving friends." The game was very well received due to featuring DS-quality graphics on a 16-bit system.
- Kart Fighter is a 2D fighting game produced for the Nintendo Entertainment System. The game features unauthorized appearances by Nintendo's mascot Mario and the rest of the cast of Super Mario Kart in a port of Street Fighter II.
- Somari is a port of Sega's flagship video game Sonic the Hedgehog, produced for the Nintendo Entertainment System and sold primarily in Asia, Russia, and other regions where pirate Famicom cartridges were distributed, in 1994. The game features a character named "Somari" – Mario wearing Tails's shoes.
- Mario 3: Around the World and Mario 4: A Space Odyssey are bootleg Mario games developed for the Sega Genesis. They were produced in Russia by a developer named "VMV" around 2011 and distributed by a publisher named Kudos. Games produced by VMV are known for having graphic imagery featured on their game over screens, and often their continue screens as well.
- Project M is a modification of the 2008 fighting game Super Smash Bros. Brawl for the Wii, created by the community to retool Brawl to play more like its two predecessors, Super Smash Bros. and Super Smash Bros. Melee.
- Newer Super Mario Bros. is a series of modifications developed by the Newer Team.
  - Newer Super Mario Bros. Wii, a modification of New Super Mario Bros. Wii, overhauls most of the original game, featuring a custom 2D map system as well as new levels and themes. An updated version titled Newer Super Mario Bros. Wii Deluxe is in progress.
  - Newer Super Mario Bros. DS, a modification of New Super Mario Bros., was released in 2018.
  - Newer Super Mario Bros. U was a cancelled modification of New Super Mario Bros. U.
- Kaze Emanuar is a particularly prolific modder of Super Mario 64, having made many significant ROM hacks including:
  - Super Mario Run 64, converting the game into a 2.5D running game in the spirit of Super Mario Run;
  - Super Mario 64 Online, enabling online multiplayer;
  - Super Mario 64 Maker, a Super Mario Maker-like level editor;
  - Super Mario 64 Odyssey, featuring levels based on Super Mario Odyssey while also adding its mechanic of possessing enemies by throwing Mario's hat;
  - Super Mario 64: Last Impact, an original game with new levels made using Super Mario 64's engine;
  - and Super Mario 64: Ocarina of Time, in which The Legend of Zelda: Ocarina of Time world is recreated in Super Mario 64's engine, with new gameplay elements, puzzles and story.
- Smash Remix is a ROM hack of the 1999 Nintendo 64 fighting game Super Smash Bros. It retains the gameplay style of the original release while adding new gameplay modes, stages, and characters; these include characters from later Super Smash Bros. games such as Ganondorf, Bowser, and Sonic the Hedgehog, and new characters such as Conker the Squirrel and the Mad Piano from Super Mario 64.
- CTGP Revolution is a modification for Mario Kart Wii by Chadsoft, incorporating the addition of fan-made custom race tracks, many of which serve as remakes of "retro" tracks that originate from older generations of Mario Kart. To replicate game's online functionality before the 2014 termination of Nintendo Wi-Fi connection, CTGP hosts the fan-made Wiimmfi service, which enables players to join online lobbies to race against others. Similar modifications for Mario Kart DS and Mario Kart 7 have also been made, titled CTGP Nitro and CTGP-7, respectively. The "Revolution" and "Nitro" titles references the respective development codenames of the Wii and Nintendo DS.
- Super Mario Eclipse is a modification of Super Mario Sunshine made with the goal of polishing and restoring cut content from the original game. An additional 120 Shine Sprites are added on to the original game (making a total of 240 Shines), which are placed in brand new locations. Two new playable characters are unlocked throughout the game.
- Mario in the Multiverse is a collaboratively developed crossover ROM hack of Super Mario 64. Each of the game's stages was designed by a different modder and based on a different franchise, such as SpongeBob SquarePants, Doom, and Katana Zero, with Mario able to acquire new abilities based on each franchise to progress.
- Super Mariomon is a full conversion ROM hack of Pokémon Emerald directed by YouTuber Alpharad, in which Mario captures various enemies from the series.

=== Level editors ===
There exist several unofficial level editors created to allow users with no programming skills to easily make their own levels or ROM hacks.

- Super Mario Bros. X is a fangame blending elements from Super Mario Bros., Bros. 2, Bros. 3 and World, and other video game franchises such as The Legend of Zelda series and includes both a level editor, as well simultaneous split-screen multiplayer. Super Mario Bros. X had received its fan-made sequel titled Super Mario Bros. X2 which had its first open beta distributed on December 2, 2015; Super Mario Bros. X2 still receives updates to this day.
- NSMB Editor is a level editor for New Super Mario Bros.
- CoinKiller is a level editor for New Super Mario Bros. 2.
- Super Mario ReMaker is a Windows-based level editor designed to replicate the Wii U title Super Mario Maker on computers.
- Toad's Tool 64 is a level editor for Super Mario 64 developed by Qubed Studios.
- Mario Builder 64 is a Super Mario 64 level editor developed by Arthurtilly and Rovertronic, which allows users to share their created levels and is capable of running on actual Nintendo 64 hardware.

=== Computer games ===
Unofficial Mario games playable on computers have consisted mostly of browser-based games. Such games either can be parodies or fangames that feature the franchise's characters or settings reimagined within the style of other media, or vice-versa.

- Syobon Action, a Mario parody known for its difficulty and troll levels.
- Ennuigi is a browser game designed by Josh Millard that centers on Luigi's inability to come to terms with the lack of narrative in Super Mario Bros.
- Super Obama World is a Flash game based on Super Mario World, featuring former United States president Barack Obama as the protagonist against enemies such as lobbyists, Sarah Palin, and pigs wearing lipstick.
- Tuper Tario Tros. is a sidescrolling platformer mashup of Super Mario Bros. and Tetris. As the visible screen automatically scrolls to the right, the player moves to the right while avoiding obstacles. The player can switch between moving the player-character Mario and dropping tetrominos that Mario can use as platforms. The game has traditional Mario enemies. The Flash game is freely available via Newgrounds. Chris Donlan of Edge wrote that the game showed signs of hasty development. Its gameplay was occasionally inelegant as a result. Jenni Lada of TechnologyTell particularly appreciated how she could build a staircase to the flagpole at the end of the level.
- Super Mario War is fan-made battle-based Mario platformer. The game has been ported to a number of platforms, including an unofficial port to the Nintendo Wii.
- Mario Royale, a 2019 browser game in which dozens of players simultaneously attempt to outrun each other in battle royale-style gameplay. After receiving a takedown notice, its creator InfernoPlus edited the game to use non-Nintendo assets as DMCA Royale. Later on, after a second takedown, there have been several instances of the game being rehosted by different people, as there currently are two available versions of the game: MRoyale and Mario Royale Legacy (formerly known as Mario Royale Deluxe), which are independent of each other.
- Mari0 is a fan game that combines elements of Portal and Super Mario Bros.
- Super Mario Bros. Crossover is a flash game that puts various video game characters into Super Mario Bros. levels.
- Super Smash Bros. Crusade is a Super Smash Bros. fan game featuring over 60 characters and 24 stages.
- Super Smash Flash is a series of non-profit, fighting, crossover, fan-made Flash games based on the Super Smash Bros. series.
- Secret Maryo Chronicles is a free, open source two-dimensional platform game.
- Super Smash Land is a demake of Super Smash Bros. featuring six playable characters and eleven stages. The game visual design resembles the graphics from the Nintendo Game Boy.
- No Mario's Sky is an indie game that crosses over between the gameplay of No Man's Sky and Super Mario Bros. Due to a Digital Millennium Copyright Act notice filed by Nintendo, the game was re-released as DMCA's Sky with all in-game references to Super Mario Bros. removed.
- Mario Kart: Source was a planned total conversion mod in development using the Source game engine developed by Valve. It was first announced in 2006 with development suspending in November 2012 due to difficulties in making a fun racing game with the engine. It is based on the Mario Kart series.
- Kill the Plumber is a platform game parody of Super Mario Bros. Players control the inhabitants of a kingdom invaded by a plumber and must stop him before he can reach a princess.
- Trumptendo is a website created by artist Jeff Hong, featuring hacked versions of various Nintendo Entertainment System games (including Super Mario Bros.) that replace characters with Donald Trump and other United States political figures.
- Super Mario 64 HD is an unofficial remake of the first level of Super Mario 64 using the Unity game engine.
- Super Mario 63 is a 2D Flash game, mostly inspired by Super Mario 64 and Super Mario 64 DS but also taking inspiration from other Mario games like Super Mario Sunshine and Super Mario Galaxy.
- Super Mario Flash is an unofficial 2-dimensional Adobe Flash-based game based on Super Mario Bros. of Super Mario All-Stars that was developed by Pouetpu and was originally released in 2007. In this single-player platform game, one can play as either Mario or Luigi, and in the game one must embark on a journey to save Princess Peach from Bowser. The game also has a built-in level editor. Gameranx praised Super Mario Flash as #4 in its "Top Five Retro Arcade Games Freely Available" article, stating that "the creator of this game has put a lot of effort into making this game as close to the original as possible." MegaLab, an Italian review website, however, gave a more negative response to Super Mario Flash, criticizing the game's controls and visual quality. In 2011, Pouetpu released a sequel called Super Mario Flash 2, which is based on Super Mario World.
- Super Mario Bros. S is a collaborative game designed to look like classic Mario games, but with the design of a modern Mario game. It is developed by superpi2. It contains multiple playable characters, new power-ups, and themes inspired by other Mario games.
- Full Screen Mario is a browser game containing all 32 Super Mario Bros. levels, a level editor, and a level generator.
- Super Chick Sisters is a 2007 PETA satirical browser game that spoofs New Super Mario Bros. and Super Mario Galaxy.
- New Super Chick Sisters is a 2009 PETA satirical browser game that spoofs New Super Mario Bros. Wii.
- Super Tanooki Skin 2D, often known as Mario Kills Tanooki, is a 2011 PETA satirical browser game that spoofs Super Mario 3D Land.
- The Super 1–1 Challenge is a 2020 fan-made remake of the first level of Super Mario Bros. recreated as a first person shooter.
- Super Mario and the Rainbow Stars is a fan game developed by Starshi, an adventure platformer based on Mario & Luigi and Paper Mario series. The game features a 3D overworld and 2D pixel art levels, with original gimmicks, bosses, and cutscenes. A demo was first released in 2024, and the March 2025 update added new features like a multiplayer mode and the badges that customize new moves, abilities, and colour palettes.
- Modern Modern Chef is a 2024 fan-made remake of the Game & Watch game Chef, based on its "Modern" incarnation from Game & Watch Gallery 2. The remake features high definition hand-drawn graphics, a more difficult alternate gameplay mode, and unlockable content.
- SpaghettiKart is an unofficial PC port of Mario Kart 64 developed by the team behind Ship of Harkinian, which adds multiple quality of life features and mod support.

== Videos and series ==
- Super Hornio Brothers and Super Hornio Brothers II are two 1993 pornographic parodies of the Super Mario franchise, released at the same time as the official Super Mario Bros. film. Both films star Buck Adams, T. T. Boy, Ron Jeremy and Chelsea Lynx as the main characters. Nintendo bought the rights to the films to halt their distribution.
- Super Mario Clouds (2002), Totally Fucked (2003), and Super Mario Movie (2005), are videos created by post-conceptual artist Cory Arcangel by modifying Super Mario Bros. NES cartridges. These works have been presented in multiple museums.
- Super Mario Bros. Z (2006–2012; 2016–present) – A sprite animated web series created by Mark Haynes that originally used Adobe Flash. It is a crossover between the Mario and Sonic the Hedgehog franchises known for dynamic, fast-paced movement and story elements inspired by Japanese animated television series Dragon Ball Z. Eight episodes would be completed and released on Newgrounds between 2006 and 2012, before its cancellation was announced. A reboot of the series was launched in 2016 on Haynes' YouTube channel. The first episode of the rebooted series would be removed after Nintendo filed a DMCA notice and took down the series' Patreon account; the episode would be re-uploaded in 2020.
- Mario: Game Over (2007) – A short-film created by comedy troupe POYKPAC. The video depicts Mario's life after breaking up with Princess Peach. The video was nominated for "Best Comedy Video" in the 2008 YouTube Awards, but lost to Potter Puppet Pals.
- Mario Kart (2008) – French viral video by prankster Rémi Gaillard, which depicts him driving a go-cart through public streets in France while dressed as Mario. He later did a similar prank in 2011.
- Mario Kart: The Movie (2009) – A fan-made trailer created by DrCoolSex that was loosely based on the Mario Kart series.
- Real Life Mario Kart (2011) – A viral video by filmmaker Freddie Wong.
- SMG4 (2011–2025) – A sketch comedy machinima web series created by Australian YouTuber and Glitch Productions co-founder, Luke Lerdwichagul. Named after the initials for Lerdwichagul's YouTube channel and username, SuperMarioGlitchy4, the series consists mainly of pop-culture parodies. Lerdwichagul's channel was created in 2009, while he was 9 years old. He would begin uploading content in 2011, primarily creating comedic videos using recorded game footage from Super Mario 64 edited in Windows Movie Maker. The series originally focused on characters from the Mario franchise, as well as other Nintendo-owned IPs, before gradually introducing original characters. The series was announced to conclude its run on October 29, 2025, and ended with its final episode on December 27 of the same year.
- Mario Warfare (2012–2015) – Created by Micah Moore, the project parodies both Super Mario and Call of Duty 4: Modern Warfare as Mario must rescue Princess Peach from the dictator Bowser in the midst of a hostile revolution.
- Racist Mario (2014) – A flash-animated short on YouTube that was created by Flashgitz. The video depicts Mario violently eliminating his opponents in Mario Kart. There are also characters from non-Nintendo video games such as God of War's Kratos, LittleBigPlanet's Sackboy, and characters from the Sonic the Hedgehog franchise.
- The Mama Luigi Project (2017) – A project where over 227 animators reanimated the internet-infamous Super Mario World episode "Mama Luigi", where over 255 split scenes were recreated in unique animation styles. The video was dedicated to the memories of both Canadian actor Tony Rosato, who voiced Luigi, and Canadian actor Harvey Atkin, who voiced King Koopa, both having died before the project's completion.
- Wario (2021) – Created by SNL, "Wario", detailing the premise of Wario (played by Elon Musk) being held in trial for the death of Mario in a racing accident, had been ridiculed and received backlash for its poor quality alongside the fact that Elon Musk had made an appearance in the show.
- HBO Mario Kart Trailer (2023) - A satirical trailer created by Saturday Night Live, it features a made-up TV adaptation of the Mario Kart racing game series. The spoof is billed as coming from the producers of HBO's The Last of Us television series. The trailer stars Pedro Pascal as Mario, Chloe Fineman as Princess Peach, Mikey Day as Luigi, Bowen Yang as Yoshi, Kenan Thompson as Bowser, and Marcello Hernández as Toad.

== Fandom ==
In the late 2000s, YouTube poop meme videos arose using footage from various Mario-related sources, including the Philips CD-i game Hotel Mario, The Super Mario Bros. Super Show!, and Super Mario World.

After the release of Mario Kart 8 in 2014, a short clip featuring "Luigi's Death Stare" went viral; the original clip featured Luigi passing other drivers with an uncharacteristically angry facial pose set to the music of Chamillionaire's 2006 hit song Ridin'. The meme was referenced by Nintendo itself during their E3 2014 presentation. It was also referenced by Huey in Paper Mario: Color Splash.

Several Mario characters have become prominent memes, such as Waluigi, who has garnered an online fanbase as a meme to the point of outcry to be added to the fighting game series Super Smash Bros. as well as backlash for his lack of inclusion in the series.

In September 2018, a fanmade character called Bowsette became popular and had hundreds of artists producing fanart. Bowsette is a depiction of Bowser using Toadette's Super Crown power-up from New Super Mario Bros. U Deluxe to transform himself into a Princess Peach lookalike.

=== "Mario dies" internet meme ===
On September 3, 2020, Nintendo announced via Nintendo Direct the Super Mario Bros. 35th Anniversary, an event celebrating the release of Super Mario Bros. in 1985. Various games were released and merchandise collaborations were held. Among the games released were Super Mario Bros. 35, a derivative of the original Super Mario Bros. with battle royale elements; Game & Watch: Super Mario Bros., an LCD handheld replica of Super Mario Bros. in the Game & Watch line; and Super Mario 3D All-Stars, a compilation game of a selection of 3D games from the Super Mario series, consisting of Super Mario 64, Super Mario Sunshine, and Super Mario Galaxy. Over the course of the celebration Nintendo announced the discontinuation of several products associated with the event on March 31, 2021, which included the aforementioned games. Other products related to the franchise were also being discontinued that same day, including merchandise sold at Nintendo's story in Tokyo, Japan, the shutdown of online services for the first Super Mario Maker game, and the removal of The Adventures of Super Mario Bros. 3 from Netflix.

The discontinuation of many of those products was never officially explained by Nintendo, although Nintendo of America president Doug Bowser explained that the decision was made to keep them unique to the anniversary celebration itself. In the lack of an official explanation, many fans ironically interpreted that it was because the character Mario was to die on that day, or the day after. Instances of the meme began months before the date. It evolved over time, originally warning fans that Mario's "death" was near and counting down the remaining days until March 31. On the day of the discontinuation itself, the character's "death" was mourned by many fans and gamers, who declared the date as "Mario Death Day".

Additionally, "Mario" was trending on Twitter, receiving 150,000 tweets related to the meme within 24 hours. Select video game news websites satirically presented Mario's "death" as fact, including VentureBeat and iMore. Notable participation included American TV network G4 and YouTube personality Nathaniel Bandy, which led to a wave of memorials from various users who grew up with the franchise.
