= HXD =

HXD may refer to:

- HxD, a computer program
- Delingha Airport, in Qinghai, China
- Douglas HXD, a flying boat
- Hilton Head Airport, in South Carolina, United States
