= Kaze Emanuar =

German ROM hacker and YouTuber

- Born: 1995 or 1996 (age 30–31); Bremen, Germany
- Occupations: YouTuber, online streamer
- Known for: ROM hacking

Twitch information
- Channel: KazeSM64
- Followers: 30,200

YouTube information
- Channel: Kaze Emanuar
- Years active: 2010–present
- Subscribers: 325,000
- Views: 58 million

Kaze Emanuar is a German YouTuber, video game programmer and ROM hacker. He is best known for his technical knowledge of Nintendo 64 and its games—particularly Super Mario 64 (1996), for which he created various ROM hacks—as well as videos discussing technical details of the console.

== Early life ==
Emanuar was born in Bremen, Germany, in 1995 or 1996. He discovered video game console emulators when he was 17, in high school. After playing a Super Mario 64 ROM hack called Star Road, he became inspired to join the N64 modding community. His first ROM hack, Super Mario 64 Madness, received poor reviews from the community, with Emanuar later calling it "awful" and admitting he was a "total noob". He continued releasing ROM hacks in 2013, becoming more accustomed to the game's engine and modding tools with each mod. He also started learning assembly language that was required to add custom features to the game. Emanuar graduated from high school in late 2014 and entered university.

== Career ==
Starting from 2013, Emanuar became highly invested in the Super Mario 64 modding scene. He would upload videos of the game and stream it on Twitch and YouTube respectively, though he stated that the amount of money made through the videos is "awful" and that he primarily makes ROM hacks due to his love of the game.

In 2014, Emanuar released Super Mario 64: Chaos Edition, a ROM hack that applied random effects designed to hinder the player every minute. This hack became popular with various online streamers, most prominently PeanutButterGamer and Vinesauce. Emanuar would update the hack multiple times, stating that he "made a bunch more versions because people really liked the game". On 30 September 2016, he released Super Mario 64: Last Impact, a ROM hack notable for its breadth of content, featuring 15 levels and 130 collectable stars. Emanuar stated that his intention behind the hack was to eclipse Star Road in scale. He had spent over 4,000 hours on creating the hack. The same month, he would also release Super Mario Run 64, a 2.5D adaptation of Super Mario Run (2016). The project reportedly took only three hours to make.

In September 2017, Emanuar released Super Mario 64 Online, a program that adds multiplayer functionality to Super Mario 64 along with new playable characters. The mod quickly gained popularity, hitting over 600,000 downloads by 13 September. The same month, Nintendo, creator and owner of the Mario franchise, filed multiple YouTube copyright strikes against videos showcasing the mod and took down Emanuar's Patreon account, though the file uploads of the program were unaffected, most likely due to the program being a separate file that interacts with but does not contain emulated Super Mario 64. A Nintendo spokesperson later stated that although the company "[appreciates] the passion of [their] fans", they have to "protect [their] own characters, trademarks and other content". Emanuar's Patreon account was later reinstated.

In late 2017, Emanuar took a break from Super Mario 64 modding, instead briefly focusing on a Sonic the Hedgehog fan game made with Unity. On 26 March 2018, Emanuar released Super Mario 64: Ocarina of Time, a ROM hack that combined the gameplay of Super Mario 64 with levels from The Legend of Zelda: Ocarina of Time (1998). The mod was positively received and was covered by various YouTubers, streamers and press outlets. In 2020, Emanuar released two notable Super Mario 64 ROM hacks: Super Mario 64 Maker, a hack that adds a level editor akin to Super Mario Maker (2015), as well as a demake of Super Mario Odyssey (2017).

Starting from 2022, Emanuar would begin uploading videos discussing Nintendo 64 technical details and optimization techniques, along with outlining Super Mario 64's bugs, technical shortcomings and poorly optimized features, fixing them in the process. He would heavily rework the game's source code in 2024 and use it as a base for his collaborative ROM hack Return to Yoshi's Island, which resulted in increased frame rate and improved graphical fidelity compared to the original game, even when running on the original Nintendo 64. The hack's technical capabilities were praised, with multiple outlets comparing the graphics to that of a GameCube game. Emanuar would also release a demake of Super Mario Sunshine (2002) the same year.

== See also ==
- List of unofficial Mario media
- Pannenkoek2012, another YouTuber known for Super Mario 64 content
- James Lambert (programmer)
- Super Mario 64 Coop Deluxe
