= WinHex =

Disk editor and universal hexadecimal editor

- Developer: X-Ways
- Stable release: 21.8 / May 25, 2026; 14 days ago
- Operating system: Windows
- Type: Hex editor
- License: Proprietary commercial software
- Website: www.x-ways.net/winhex/index-m.html

WinHex is a commercial disk editor and universal hexadecimal editor (hex editor) used for data recovery and digital forensics. WinHex includes academic and forensic practitioners, the Oak Ridge National Laboratory, Hewlett-Packard, National Semiconductor, law enforcement agencies, and other companies with data recovery and protection needs.

WinHex is compatible with Microsoft Windows operating systems.

== Features ==
WinHex's features are as follows:

1. Read and directly edit hard drives (FAT and NTFS), floppy disks, CD-ROMs, DVDs, CompactFlash cards and other media
2. Read and directly edit random-access memory (RAM)
3. Interpret 20 data types
4. Edit partition tables, boot sectors, and other data structures using templates
5. Join and split files
6. Analyze and compare files
7. Search and replace
8. Clone and image drives
9. Recover data
10. Encrypt files (AES-128)
11. Create hashes and checksums
12. Wipe drives

Forensics features with a Specialist license include:

1. Gather free and slack space
2. Search for text based on keywords
3. Create tab-delimited tables of drive contents

== See also ==
- Comparison of hex editors
