= James Lambert (programmer) =

Programmer and ROM hacker

- Occupation: Programmer

YouTube information
- Channel: James Lambert
- Years active: 2022–present
- Genre: Nintendo 64 homebrew
- Subscribers: 85.4 thousand
- Views: 7.76 million
- Last updated: September 10, 2026

James Lambert is a programmer known for his involvement in the Nintendo 64 homebrew scene. He has created multiple projects and technology demonstrations that push the limits of Nintendo 64, demonstrating effects and concepts not normally possible on the console, such as high resolution textures, open world gameplay and virtual reality support. Some of his demonstrations eventually evolved into full games.

== Projects ==
=== Portal 64 ===
One of Lambert earliest projects to gather attention was a demake of the 2007 video game Portal to Nintendo 64 hardware. Entitled Portal 64, he got a fully playable version that resembled the original game by May 2022. Lambert kept adding to the game, adding voice lines, better lighting, and fixed some physics issues. By January 2024, Lambert had remade the game until the thirteenth level, which was the same amount as the demo version of Portal, Portal: The First Slice. On January 12, 2024, Valve Corporation, the publisher of Portal, sent a DMCA takedown request to Lambert to take down the project, which was seen as unusual due to Valve usually endorsing fan works. Valve cited the project dependents of Nintendo’s proprietary libraries as the reason, with Ars Technica also noting Nintendo's aggressive intellectual property protection.

=== Megatextures ===
Megatextures tech demo running on the Nintendo 64

In September 2023, Lambert released a Nintendo 64 tech demo showcasing clipmap technology similar to id Software's MegaTextures. Standard N64 textures were limited to a file size of 4 KB, allowing a maximum resolution of 32x32 with general RGBA 32-bit color textures and a theoretical maximum at 128x64 with 4-bit grayscale textures. Lambert's clipmapping method allows textures with a maximum resolution of 1024x1024, with the tech demo using mipmapping to swap far away textures with lower resolution counterparts; loading the textures the normal way would cause the console to crash, as it would attempt to load 40 MB of texture data into 4 MB of RAM. Lambert noted that making a full game with the technology would be problematic, as the demo, set in a small isolated room, used up more than half of the maximum N64 cartridge size of 64 MB. Time Extension praised the demo, comparing its graphical fidelity to that of a GameCube title.

=== Virtual reality support ===
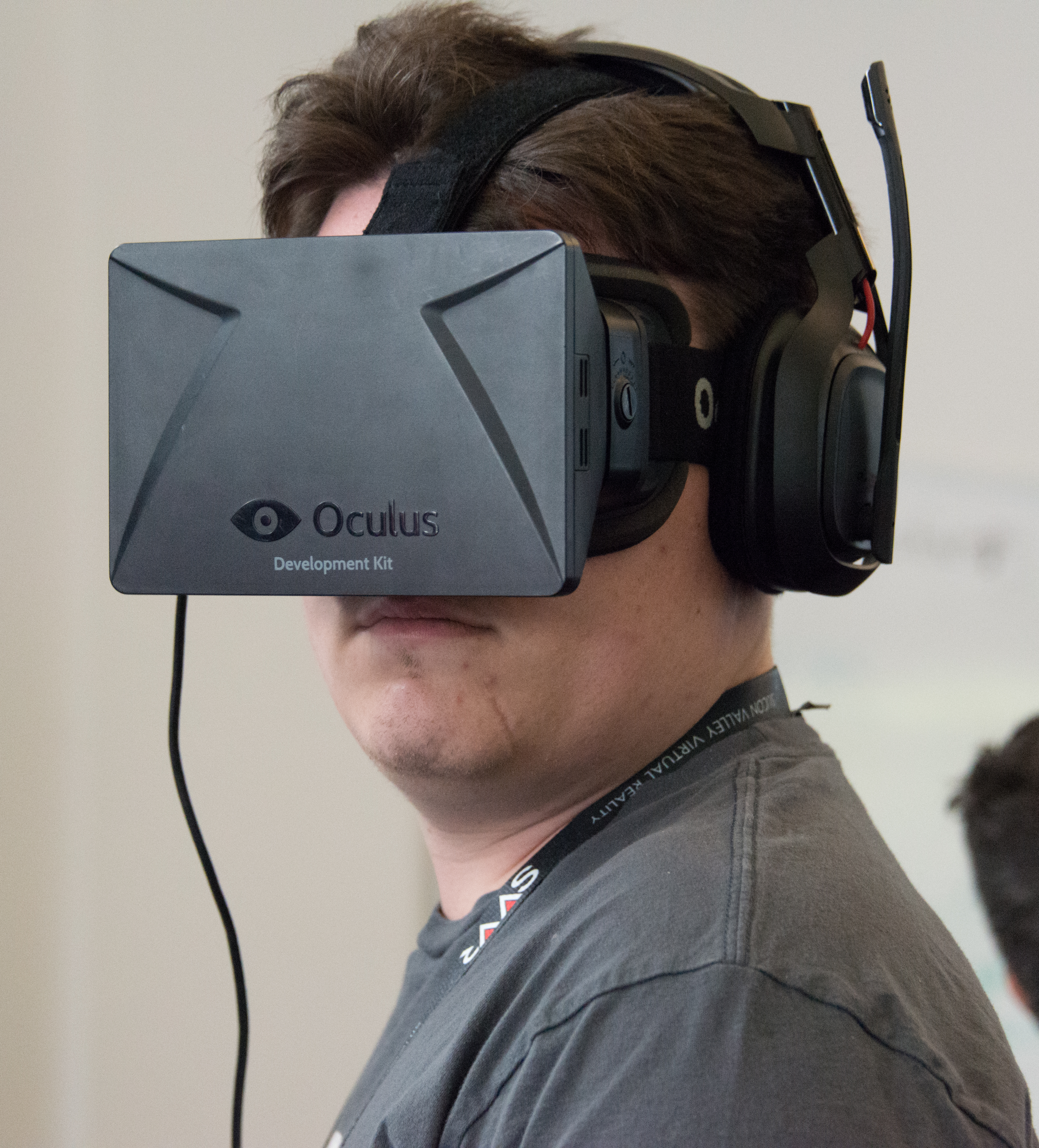
Palmer Luckey wearing Oculus Rift DK1, the same model as used by Lambert

In March 2024, Lambert implemented full virtual reality support for Nintendo 64. While other implementations of VR support for N64 games were done through console emulators, Lambert's solution worked purely on the original console's hardware. The console was running a ROM hack of Super Mario 64, which rendered the virtual camera twice from two different angles, one for each eye. He used an Oculus Rift DK1 development kit and connected it to N64 via HDMI and USB. Lambert noted that the low screen resolution of 320x480 per eye, low frame rate and high input lag makes the experience "pretty motion-sickness inducing". He was also disappointed with not being able to make the Power Glove function within the setup, while also noting glitches such as billboarding sprites being distorted at extreme angles. GamesRadar+ described the implementation as "pushing aging video game hardware to its absolute limits."

=== Spellcraft ===
After the removal of Portal 64, Lambert began working on a role-playing video game for the Nintendo 64 titled Spellcraft, featuring an ability to combine different runes for customizable spells. Lambert stated that he was disappointed with the lack of spell creation in most RPGs. He also stated that a physical release on a Nintendo 64 Game Pak is planned. Various sources compared Spellcraft's mechanics to Dungeon Master and Magicka.

=== Junk Runner 64 ===
Longplay of Junk Runner 64

In March 2026, Lambert released Junk Runner 64, a Nintendo 64 game with an open world that is comparable in size to the map in The Elder Scrolls V: Skyrim. Due to the 8-bit z-buffer that introduces z-fighting on far away objects due to its low bit depth, Lambert made two separate cameras for the close and far view. To mitigate performance drawbacks of rendering two viewports at once, he disabled the z-buffer on the far camera entirely, manually rendering polygons from back to front.

== See also ==
- Kaze Emanuar
- PangaeaPanga
