= Undubbing =

Removal of dubbed audio in a video game mod

Undubbing is a type of video game hacking that restores the original language audio content of a game that has been localized for export while retaining the translated text of the language into which it has been localized.

A typical candidate for an undub is a Japanese game which has been published in the United States, with voice acting dubbed in English and text content translated into English, but lacking an in-game option to use the original Japanese audio. The process of undubbing consists of identifying the location and format of the relevant audio content in both the localized and the original versions of the game, then grafting the audio data extracted from the original language version into the localised game.

Oftentimes, dialogue will be completely rewritten in translation, which prompts some to do a total or partial retranslation of the game in order for the displayed text to fit the actual context of the audio content. Content present in the original game, but cut in the process of localization (due to reasons such as censorship, or, in some cases, a lack of time) may also be restored in an undub.

== Reasons for undubbing ==
Voice acting is a considerably bigger business in Japan than it currently is in English-speaking countries. It is not uncommon for acclaimed TV animation voice actors to be signed by a video game publisher to provide voice acting for a high-profile game. In the west, on the other hand, voice localization projects usually have smaller budgets, and as such, do not have as professional a market as the Japanese one. Due to this, there is a perceived notion that Japanese voice acting is of higher quality, and as such many fans prefer to listen to the Japanese audio track while playing the game, even if they do not speak or understand the Japanese language. Undubbing thus caters either to an audience who does not speak the original language or has not mastered it well enough to enjoy the untranslated text in an imported version of the original game, but still prefers the original audio for the reasons mentioned above, or to an audience that speaks the original language, but prefers to read in the Latin alphabet (or simply hear the original voice-actors chosen by the original studio, as it's not uncommon in Japan to create a character with a specific voice-actor in mind). Because the localized text is left in place where present, an undubbed game can usually still be fully played by those who could not play the import.

== See also ==
- Fan translation of video games
- ROM hacking
