= ImHex =

Free cross-platform hex editor

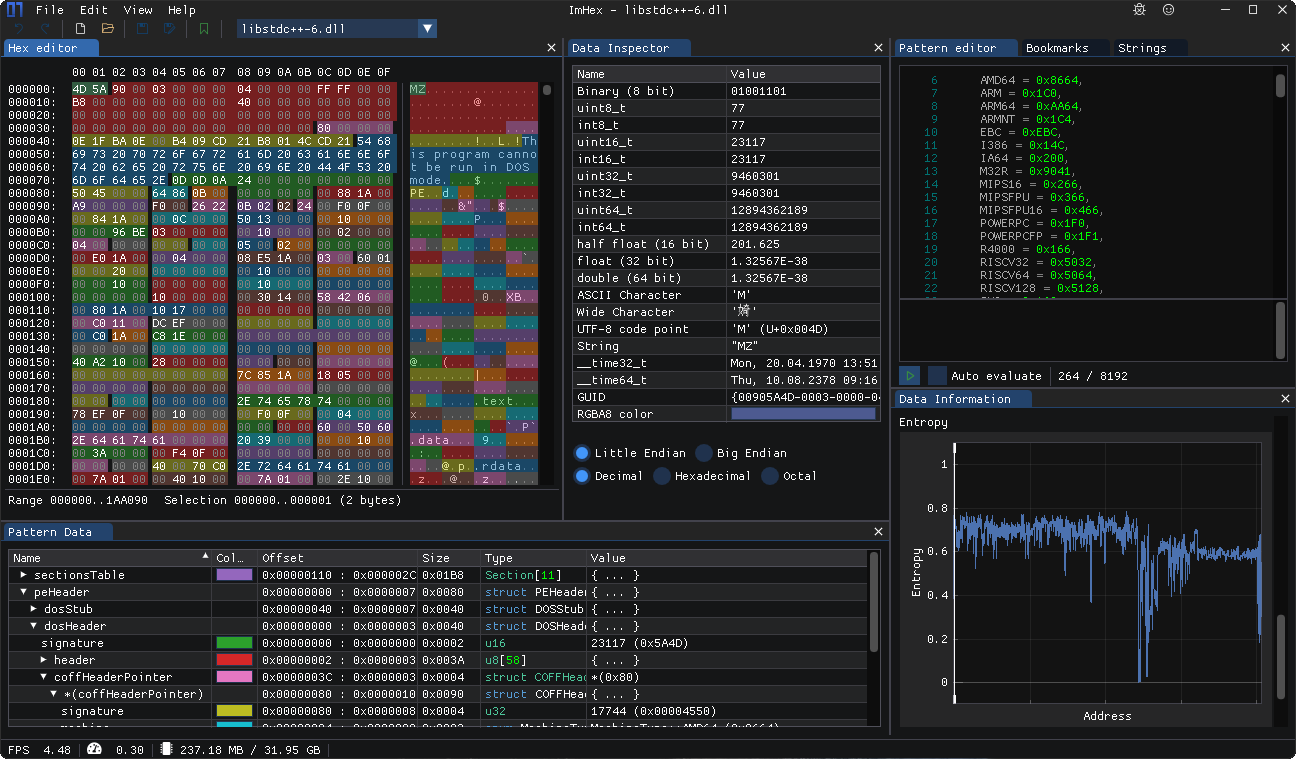
- Developer: WerWolv
- Release: November 12, 2020; 5 years ago
- Stable release: 1.38.1 / December 21, 2025; 9 months ago
- Written in: C++
- Operating system: Windows, macOS, Linux
- Available in: English
- Type: Hex editor
- License: GNU General Public License v2.0
- Website: imhex.werwolv.net
- Repository: github.com/WerWolv/ImHex

ImHex is a free cross-platform hex editor available on Windows, macOS, and Linux.

ImHex is used by programmers and reverse engineers to view and analyze binary data.

== History ==
The initial release of the project in November 2020, saw significant interest on GitHub.

== Features ==
Features include:

- Hex editor
- Custom pattern matching and analysis scripting language
- Visual, node based data pre-processor
- Disassembler
- Running and visualizing of YARA rules
- Bookmarks
- Binary data diffing
- Additional Tools
  - MSVC, Itanium, D and Rust name demangler
  - ASCII table
  - Calculator
  - Base converter
  - File utilities
  - IEEE 754 floating point decoder
  - Division by invariant multiplication calculator
  - TCP/IP client and server

Support for:

- Data importing and exporting
- ASCII string, Unicode string, numeric, hexadecimal and regular expressions search
- Byte manipulation
- File hashing
- Plug-ins

== See also ==
- Comparison of hex editors
- Reverse engineering
