= HxD =

Free hex and disk editor

- Developer: Maël Hörz
- Initial release: 2003
- Stable release: 2.5.0.0 / February 11, 2021; 4 years ago
- Written in: Delphi
- Operating system: Windows
- Available in: Multilingual
- Type: Hex editor
- License: Proprietary (Freeware)
- Website: mh-nexus.de/hxd

HxD is a freeware hex editor, disk editor, and memory editor developed by Maël Hörz for Windows. It can open files larger than 4 GiB and open and edit the raw contents of disk drives, as well as display and edit the memory used by running processes. Among other features, it can calculate various checksums, compare files, or shred files.

HxD is distributed as freeware and is available in multiple languages of which the English version is the first in the category of coding utilities on Download.com. The c't magazine has featured HxD in several issues and online-specials.

== Features ==
- Disk editor (both Windows 9x/NT and up)
- Memory editor
  - Data-folding to show/hide memory sections.
- Data inspector
  - Converts current data into many types, for editing and viewing
  - Open source plugin-framework to extend with new, custom type converters
- Multiple files are presented using a mixture of tabbed document interface and multiple document interface.
- Large files up to 8 EiB can be loaded and edited.
- Partial file loading for performance.
- Search and replace for several data types (including Unicode-strings, floats and integers).
- Calculation and checking of checksums and hashes.
- File utility operations
  - File shredder for safe file deletion.
  - Splitting or concatenating of files.
- File compare (only byte by byte)
- Importing and exporting of hex files (Intel HEX, Motorola S-record)
- Exporting of data to several formats
  - Source code (C, Pascal, Java, C#, VB.NET, PureBasic)
  - Formatted output (plain text, HTML, RTF, TeX)
- Statistical view: Graphical representation of the character distribution.
- Available in 32 and 64-bit (including memory editor)

== See also ==
- Hex editor
- Comparison of hex editors
