= Tuper Tario Tros. =

2009 video game

- Developer: Swing Swing Submarine
- Publisher: Newgrounds
- Series: Mario (unofficial)
- Platform: Browser
- Release: December 24, 2009
- Genres: Platform, puzzle
- Mode: Single-player

Tuper Tario Tros. is a Flash platform video game first released on Newgrounds on December 24, 2009 by the French developer Swing Swing Submarine. It is a combination of Super Mario Bros. and Tetris, using mechanics from both games. The title of this game is a play on Super Mario Bros., replacing the first letter of each word with the "T" from Tetris. The game features World 1-1. The developers of the game later made a similar game inspired by Tuper Tario Tros., titled Blocks That Matter.

== Gameplay ==
The game starts out with normal Super Mario Bros. 2D platformer gameplay. After a short while, however, the player is granted the ability to control tetrimino blocks across the field of play. The blocks fall from a Lakitu, and can be stacked and become platforms which the player can use to make Mario cross large gaps or reach higher terrain. Pressing the spacebar will change between modes, either controlling Mario or controlling the falling blocks. The screen moves automatically forward to the right, and the player is bound only within the screen.

== Reception ==
Chris Donlan of Edge wrote that the game appeared to have been put together quickly and as a result, its gameplay was occasionally inelegant. Jenni Lada of TechnologyTell appreciated how she could build a staircase to the flagpole at the end of the level. A reviewer for VentureBeat called the game "extremely well done", though taking issue with the high difficulty and the game's title.

== See also ==
- List of unofficial Mario media
