= Super Mario Clouds =

2002 installation artwork by Cory Arcangel

- Artist: Cory Arcangel
- Year: 2002
- Website: coryarcangel.com/things-i-made/2002-001-super-mario-clouds

Super Mario Clouds is a 2002 multi-channel video installation artwork by Cory Arcangel that displays a modified version of the video game Super Mario Bros. in which all game assets besides the sky and clouds are removed. Its first major exhibition was the 2004 Whitney Biennial. Super Mario Clouds is among the artist's best known works.

== Description ==
Super Mario Clouds is an installation artwork based on a hardware modification to a Super Mario Bros. game cartridge. The mod removes visual assets from the Nintendo Entertainment System game, removing the mushrooms, grasses, and protagonist (Mario), and leaving just the blue sky and its white clouds. In what's left onscreen, pixelated clouds slowly scroll over a blue background.

== Production and exhibition ==
Soon out of college, Arcangel shared the original Super Mario Clouds video and code on his website in 2002. As originally designed, the work was meant for sharing rather than exhibition. Cognizant that he could not display in galleries, it was Arcangel's first work for the Internet and was intended for Internet virality. The artist was more interested in sharing how the modification was done than in the final product's aesthetics. Its Internet presence led to offers to show the work in real life.

The next year, Arcangel displayed the work as a multi-channel video installation at Team Gallery in New York, with the modified Nintendo Entertainment System console in view. He exhibited the same set up the following year at the 2004 Whitney Biennial. One of the work's five editions is in the Whitney Museum collection.

In 2005, Arcangel created The Making of Super Mario Clouds as an instruction manual and video. He published the code in zine-style publications with a Creative Capital grant.

== Reception and legacy ==
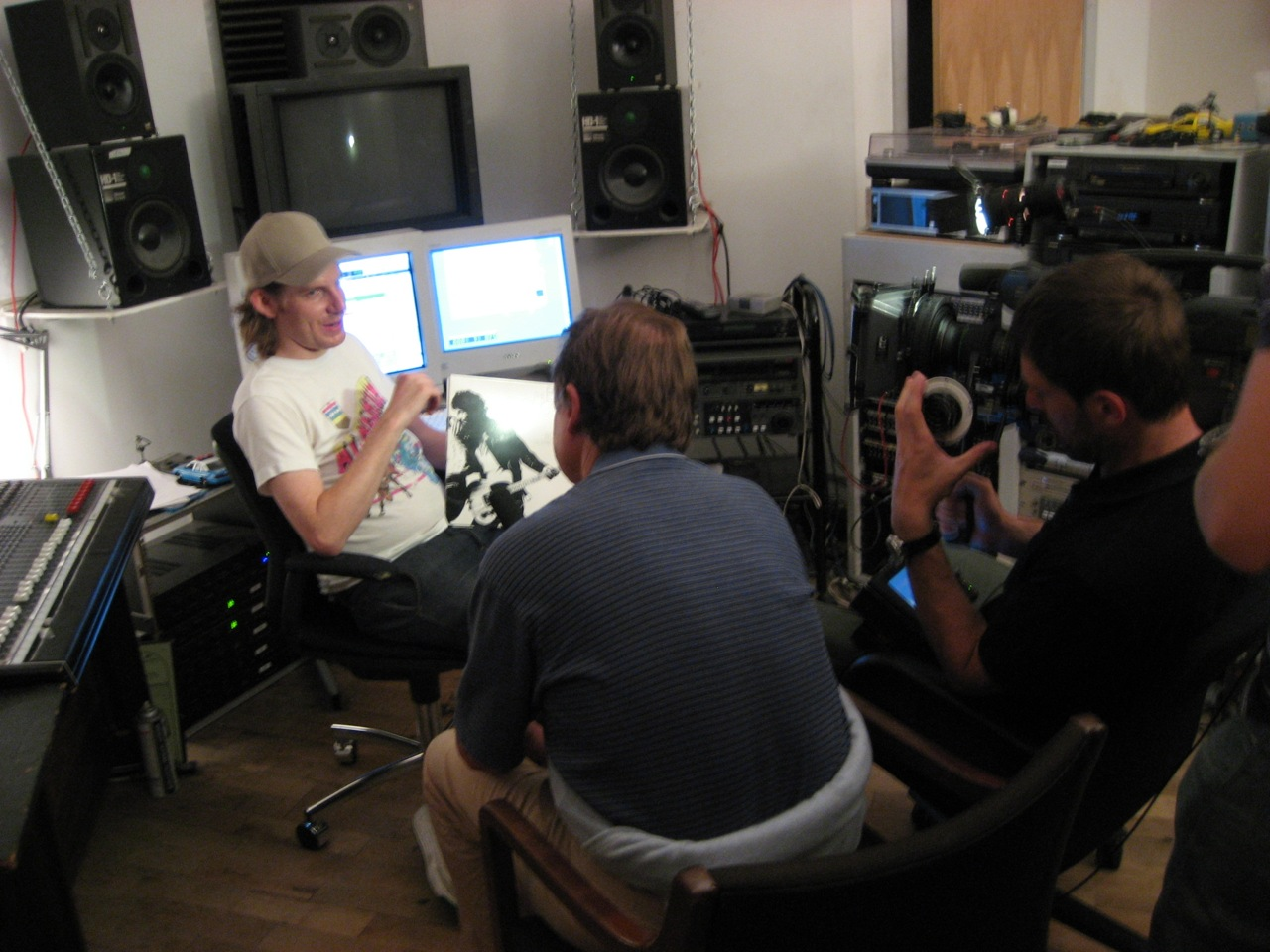
The artist in his studio, 2006

Super Mario Clouds is among Cory Arcangel's best known works. Its presence at the 2004 Whitney Biennial heralded the arrival of new media artists with digital native backgrounds in the professional art world. It was not the first work to attempt this concept, as Myfanwy Ashmore had modified and displayed Super Mario works several years prior. Despite the broad public interest his work received at this time, critics continued to be divided in opinion on Arcangel's work for many years.

The installation is intentionally underwhelming. In invoking and stripping a popular cultural touchstone, the work invokes melancholy for those familiar with the Super Mario Bros. original.

== See also ==
- List of unofficial Mario media

== Bibliography ==
- Cornell, Lauren; Halter, Ed, eds. (2015). Mass Effect: Art and the Internet in the Twenty-First Century. Critical Anthologies in Art and Culture. MIT Press. ISBN 978-0-262-02926-1.
- Sharp, John (2015). Works of Game: On the Aesthetics of Games and Art. MIT Press. ISBN 978-0-262-32822-7.
