= Myfanwy Ashmore =

Canadian artist

- Born: North York, Ontario, Canada
- Education: Emily Carr University of Art and Design Ontario College of Art & Design York University
- Notable work: Soma/Somo Project, Mario Battle No.1

Myfanwy Ashmore is a Canadian artist known for her game-related art. She works across digital and new media formats.

== Education ==
Ashmore studied at the Emily Carr College of Art and Design in 1990, moving to the Ontario College of Art & Design's Sculpture/Installation where she graduated in 1996. She received her MFA from York University in 1998.

== Career ==
Ashmore is primarily known for her software-related art. She has exhibited alongside Yoko Ono, Sol LeWitt, Liam Gillick, Robert Gober, George Brecht, lo-bat, COVOX, Mark Hosler of negativland, Norman White and others.

Her 2000 soma/somo project, a series of networked decaying grapefruits, was publicly criticized in the Canadian Parliament by Inky Mark, heritage critic of the Reform Party. Mark argued that the public money spent by the Canada Council for the Arts on this and other artistic projects was misspent.

Her 2000 software art work entitled Mario Battle no.1 has been one of her most recognized and widely exhibited works. This program and two subsequent works Mario Doing Time and Mario is Drowning (both 2004), are based on Super Mario Bros.. The series plays on typical "rescue the princess" themes, Mario Battle no.1 was distributed by Year01.com and runme.org, initially by ROM and emulator on floppies across North America, and later online. It has been compared with Cory Arcangel's Super Mario Clouds as an example of games as art object, and "reduction and abstraction of the source material". The series, appeared in a 2006 exhibition at InterAccess Electronic Media Arts Centre, as well as in public screenings of a one-minute video of Mario Battle no.1 in Sankofa Square (then Yonge-Dundas Square) as part of Year Zero One's TRANSMEDIA :29:59 festival. It was later exhibited in 2012 at the Platform Centre for Photographic and Digital Arts in Winnipeg.

In 2004, Ashmore was part of the exhibition 0.001 Percent Volume, curated by Dave Dyment at Mercer Union in Toronto.

Her work was included in Episode 4 of Lorna Mills' Ways of Something (2014-2015).

=== Teaching ===
Ashmore has taught New Media in the Image Arts Program at Ryerson University (now Toronto Metropolitan University) in Toronto.

=== Awards ===
Ashmore has received numerous grants as well as awards from various councils and artist-run centres. She was nominated and short listed for the prestigious 2003 K.M. Hunter award through the Ontario Arts Council.
