= Blocks That Matter =

2011 video game

- Developer: Swing Swing Submarine
- Publisher: Swing Swing Submarine
- Designer: William David
- Platforms: Windows, Mac OS X, Linux, Xbox 360
- Release: 19 August 2011
- Genre: Puzzle-platform
- Mode: Single-player

Blocks That Matter is a 2D puzzle-platform game developed by French independent studio Swing Swing Submarine. It was released on August 19, 2011 for Windows, Mac, Linux and Xbox 360. The game was inspired by one of the developer's earlier works, Tuper Tario Tros.

== Gameplay ==
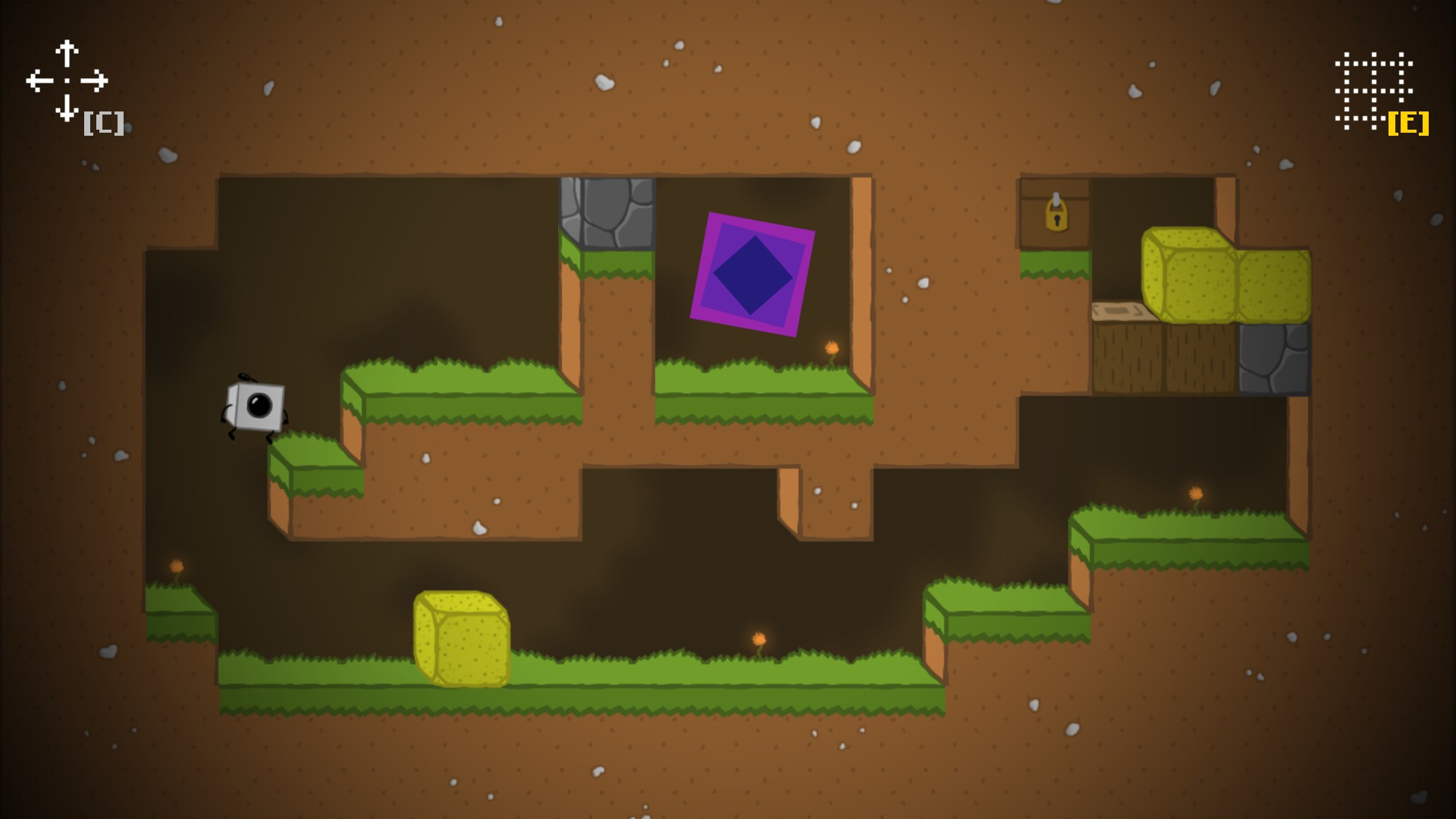
Gameplay screenshot

The player takes the role of "Tetrobot", a robot which is able to collect blocks by hitting them from under (Mario reference) or drilling them, and can then construct shapes in a "puzzle mode" using four blocks at a time. Blocks That Matter heavily references the games Minecraft and Tetris through the main characters, in-game mechanics and concepts such as "Pajitnovian physics".

The game's name comes from special blocks hidden in the story mode levels. They are unusable blocks that initially appear in levels as treasure chests, which serve no purpose other than to unlock bonus levels. The blocks are direct references to famous blocks in games that inspired the developers, such as a ?-block from Super Mario Bros., an Aperture Science Weighted Companion Cube from Portal, Rubik's Cube, and a die, hence the "blocks that matter".

== Release ==
Blocks That Matter was made available as a bonus during the Voxatron Humble Indie Bundle along with The Binding of Isaac. In June 2018 the game was ported to the OpenPandora, an ARM processor-based Linux handheld.

== Reception ==
Reception

Aggregate score
Aggregator	Score
Metacritic	76/100

Review scores
Publication	Score
Destructoid	9/10
IGN	8.5/10

Blocks That Matter received generally favourable reviews, with an aggregated score of 76 on Metacritic. Blocks That Matter was the Dream Build Play 2011 Challenge "Grand Prize" Winner, earning $40,000 and the opportunity for an XBLA publishing contract.

== Legacy ==
The Tetrobot appears as a playable character in UFHO2, Cook, Serve, Delicious!, and Bounty Battle.
