= Super Hornio Brothers =

1993 pornographic parody films by Buck Adams

Super Hornio Brothers Super Hornio Brothers II
- VHS covers to both films
- Directed by: Buck Adams
- Written by: Cash Markman (Marc Cushman)
- Starring: Buck Adams; T. T. Boy; Don Fernando; Ron Jeremy; Krysti Lynn; Chelsea Lynx; Kitty Yung
- Production company: Midnight Video
- Release date: 1993
- Running time: 78 minutes (Super Hornio Brothers); 73 minutes (Super Hornio Brothers II)
- Country: United States
- Language: English

Super Hornio Brothers and Super Hornio Brothers II are two 1993 pornographic parodies of the Super Mario video game series released at the same time as the film, Super Mario Bros. Both films star director Buck Adams, along with T. T. Boy, Ron Jeremy and Chelsea Lynx together as the main characters. Nintendo bought the rights to the films to halt their distribution.

The films gained new interest after a write-up by a Something Awful reviewer. The second film was rediscovered in 2009, whereas a rip of the first film was eventually rediscovered in 2014 by another Something Awful user.

== Plot ==
=== Super Hornio Brothers ===
Programmer brothers Squeegie (Ron Jeremy) and Ornio Hornio (T.T. Boy), are teleported into Squeegie's in-development PC game after a freak power overload. After regaining their bearings, Squeegie figures out and explains to Ornio that they are stuck in the black void of a computer monitor when it is turned off. A computer virus informs the brothers that King Pooper (Buck Adams), has kidnapped Princess Perlina (Chelsea Lynx). Pooper intends on forcefully having Perlina help him travel to Earth with a tub full of semen energized by a special generator.

Squeegie and Ornio travel through the computer world, encountering other villains who attempt to delay them and hamper their efforts. Squeegie is temporarily separated from his brother in the process. Finding Pooper's lair first, Squeegie attempts to free Princess Perlina, only to be found by Pooper. Attempting to fight Pooper alone, Squeegie is about to lose when Ornio reappears and shoves Pooper into the tub, where he melts and dies. The brothers ask Perlina to teleport them back to Earth, but Perlina only transports herself and Ornio back, leaving Squeegie behind in the cyberworld. Attempting to manipulate the generator to get back to the real world, Squeegie is confronted and appears to be captured by a revived Pooper.

=== Super Hornio Brothers II ===
After a lengthy recap of the first installment, Perlina and Ornio teleport back to Squeegie's office. Wondering where Squeegie is, Ornio is distracted by Perlina offering sex as a reward for saving her from King Pooper. Afterwards, Ornio asks Perlina to bring Squeegie back to the real world. The teleportation goes horribly wrong; Perlina teleports both Squeegie and Pooper just as Pooper confronts Squeegie at the generator seen at the end of Super Hornio Brothers. King Pooper escapes, and he begins to enact his ultimate goal, bluntly explained by Perlina to the Hornio Brothers as to "procreate and create more Pooper offspring" While Pooper hires a prostitute to start his plan, Squeegie theorizes that the generator is the key to Pooper's scheme and draws up plans to destroy it.

Mimicking what they did the first time around, Squeegie and Ornio teleport back into the computer. Guided by the computer virus, Ornio distracts a hooker, which allows Squeegie and the computer virus to go back to Pooper's lair. Squeegie comes up with a plan to thwart Pooper by having the computer virus overload the generator and knock it out. The computer virus rubs his body against the machine, causing it to overload. Squeegie explains to Ornio and Perlina back in the real world that by overloading the generator, King Pooper is now in "a state of limbo" and won't cause any more trouble. Ecstatic, Perlina embraces and hugs Ornio while ignoring Squeegie. A spurned Squeegie turns to the camera and says that he expected the film to end this way.

== Cast ==
=== Super Hornio Brothers ===
- Buck Adams as King Pooper
- T. T. Boy as Ornio Hornio
- Natasia as Bon Dori, Queen of Bondage
- Don Fernando as Bob
- Ron Jeremy as Squeegie Hornio
- Krysti Lynn as Spider Woman
- Chelsea Lynx as Princess Perlina
- Kitty Yung as Ileeza, Mistress of Evil

=== Super Hornio Brothers II ===
- Buck Adams as King Pooper
- T.T. Boy as Ornio Hornio
- Don Fernando as Bob
- Ron Jeremy as Squeegie Hornio
- Krysti Lynn as Spider Woman
- Chelsea Lynx as Princess Perlina

== Production ==
Initially, porn studio Sin City Entertainment funded the project, but they dropped out, leaving Buck Adams to seek the help of Midnight Video to finish the film. In return for funding, Adams was asked by Midnight Video to trim the 37-page script, split the film into two and cut the filming schedule from three days to two. Jeremy notes that the total production cost reportedly around $20,000, and that Buck Adams "...tried very hard to simulate the basic show. Buck knew Mario Brothers inside and out."

== Preservation status ==
Initially thought of as a rumor, Ron Jeremy's official site notes that while they would love to make both films available alongside the massive library they have, Nintendo bought up the rights to both films to halt distribution indefinitely. Jeremy notes in an interview that such buying of porn parodies to halt distribution are "unheard of" in the porn industry and that he only found out about it when a company called Hot Movies tried to buy his back catalog for distribution and found out about the purchase.

=== Something Awful ===
In July 2008, Zack Parsons of Something Awful was tipped off by a forum post claiming that there was a pornographic parody of Super Mario Bros. Initially dismissed as fake, upon being confirmed as real, the site attempted to buy the film through retailers with no luck. The next month, Parsons issued a challenge for the site's "Horrors of Pornography" section to obtain a copy. After numerous false leads, ranging from SA users giving a sex only CD-ROM with none of the dialogue scenes to people remembering they once had it but ultimately having another porno they mistook, an anonymous benefactor gave Awful a DVD-rip of II in June 2009. The sequel contained a recap of I, which was sufficient for the site's reviewer of it to play catch-up.

The Something Awful article is often the basis of other sites "finding out" about and making articles about the porn parody. In addition, the films are claimed to have both existed and not existed by many people.

In 2014, a Something Awful forum user claimed to have purchased a copy of Super Hornio Brothers, and had planned to digitise it so there would be a cleaner rip of the film. However, this was a mislabeled tape of Super Hornio Brothers II in the packaging of the first film.

== See also ==
- List of unofficial Mario media
