= HIEW =

Console hex editor

Hiew
- Developer: Eugene Suslikov
- Stable release: 8.81 / March 24, 2024; 2 years ago
- Operating system: Microsoft Windows
- Type: Utility
- Licence: Proprietary
- Website: www.hiew.ru

HIEW, sometimes given as Hiew, (short for Hacker's view) is a console hex editor for Windows written by Eugene Suslikov (sen). Amongst its feature set is its ability to view files in text, hex and disassembly mode. The program is particularly useful for editing executable files such as COFF, PE, or ELF executable files.

== Features ==
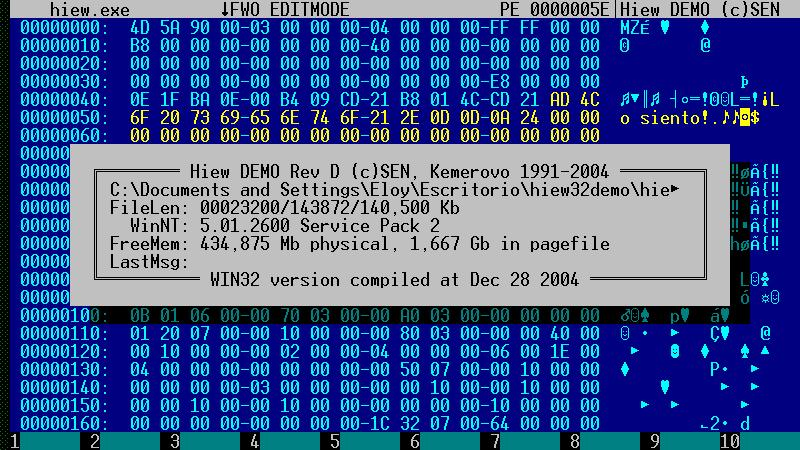
Demo screenshot

Hiew's features include:

- Built-in x86, x86-64 and ARMv6 assembler and disassembler.
- Pattern searching in hex/text/disassembler mode.
- Support for NE, LE, LX, PE and little-endian ELF executable formats.
- Built-in 64-bit calculator.
- Supports files of arbitrary length.
- Support for working with files and physical disks
- Functionality can be extended via exposed API with Hiew External Modules support.

== Sources ==
- Peter Szor (2005). The Art of Computer Virus Research and Defense. Pearson Education. ISBN 9780672333903.
- Kris Kaspersky (2007). Hacker Disassembling Uncovered, 2nd Ed. A-LIST, LLC.
- Reginald Wong (2018). "Tools of the Trade". Mastering Reverse Engineering: Re-engineer Your Ethical Hacking Skills. Packt Publishing. p. 139. ISBN 9781788835299.
