= Pannenkoek2012 =

Super Mario 64 YouTuber

pannenkoek2012
- A screenshot from the video "The 255 Coin Limit", used as Pannenkoek2012's profile picture
- Born: Scott Buchanan; 1993 or 1994 (age 32–33)

YouTube information
- Channels: pannenkoek2012; UncommentatedPannen
- Genres: Gaming, Super Mario 64 analyses
- Subscribers: 359 thousand+ (pannenkoek2012); 135 thousand+ (UncommentatedPannen)
- Views: 105.8 million+ (pannenkoek2012); 38.5 million+ (UncommentatedPannen)
- Last updated: September 18, 2026

Scott Buchanan, known online as pannenkoek2012 (Note: A pannenkoek is a Dutch pancake, and is pronounced [ˈpɑnə(ŋ)ˌkuk]. Thus, a Dutch pronunciation of the full username would be [ˈpɑnə(ŋ)ˌkuk tʋeːˈdœyzənˈtʋaːl(ə)f]. However, pannenkoek2012 uses an Anglicized spelling pronunciation, /ˈpænənˌkoʊək ˈtuː θaʊzənd ˈtwɛlv/ PAN-ən-KOH-ək TOO thow-zənd TWELV, to refer to himself.) (/ˈpænənˌkoʊək/ PAN-ən-KOH-ək; born 1993 or 1994, is a YouTuber who specializes in highly in-depth and technical videos about the 1996 3D platformer video game Super Mario 64. He is best known for his "A-button challenge" videos, in which he creates tool-assisted runs of sections of the game pressing the A-button as few times as possible. The A-button is the "jump" button, and completing Super Mario 64 usually takes thousands of A-presses.

In 2014, he received media attention for collecting a particular coin which, due to a bug, had been thought to be uncollectable. In 2015, he offered a US$1,000 bounty to anyone who could recreate in Mupen64 a rare but useful Super Mario 64 glitch called an "upwarp" that was accidentally performed by DOTA_TeaBag.

== Early life ==
Scott Buchanan was born in 1993 or 1994. He is a computer science major. Super Mario 64 was the first video game Buchanan ever played as a child.

== Career ==
In 2013, while still in college, he started uploading Super Mario 64 videos to YouTube. These videos showcased his attempts to complete all of Super Mario 64 without pressing the A-button (the jump button, Mario's primary ability), making use of environmental hazards and various glitches instead. These alternative strategies are often only possible with tool assistance.

Buchanan has produced many in-depth YouTube videos deconstructing the mechanics of Super Mario 64, which have been described as esoteric "programming lessons". In one video, he explains how a player can manipulate the pseudorandom number generator of Super Mario 64 by kicking up dust particles that call this function. Despite their highly arcane nature, videos on the pannenkoek2012 channel regularly get hundreds of thousands of views. Buchanan also runs a second channel, UncommentatedPannen, where he uploads raw footage without commentary. He does not upload videos to his main channel if they fail to meet his standards of quality.

=== A-button challenge ===
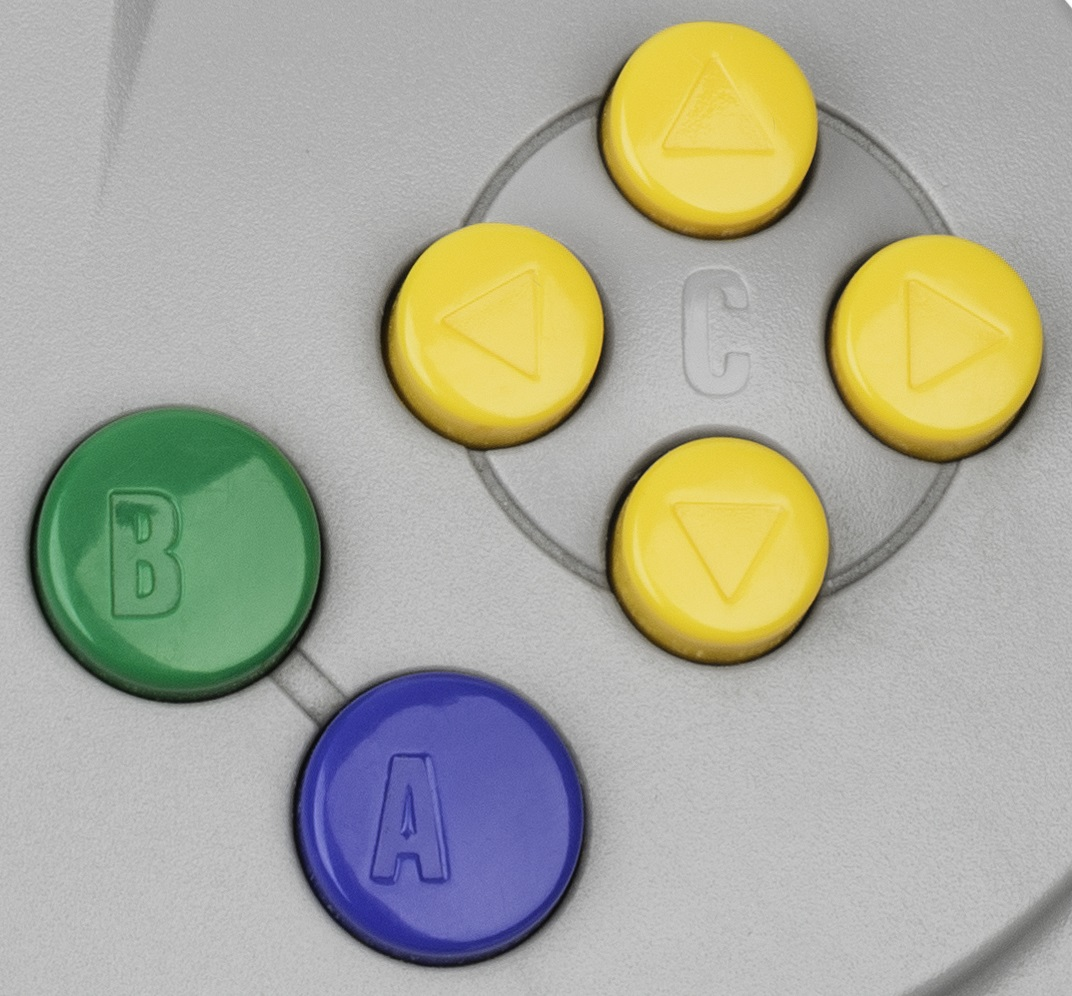
A closeup of a Nintendo 64 controller showing the A-button (bottom, blue), which pannenkoek2012 has challenged himself to avoid pressing

The bulk of pannenkoek2012 videos are about the "A-button challenge" (ABC), a self-imposed challenge whose ultimate goal is to complete Super Mario 64 while pressing the A-button as little as possible, or not at all. In regular gameplay, the A-button makes Mario jump; this is one of the fundamental game mechanics of Super Mario 64, a platformer whose gameplay has been described as "all about jumping". It is possible to jump without the A-button in very rare, but often useless circumstances. In one video, it is shown that collecting the star "Mario Wings to the Sky" in the level "Bob-omb Battlefield" is possible without pressing the A-button at all. To do this, Buchanan exploits a use-after-free bug to "clone" a large number of Goombas to form a ladder. This strategy took two years of planning, and the video took 55 hours to make.

==== Watch for Rolling Rocks ====
External videos
- SM64 - Watch for Rolling Rocks - 0.5x A Presses (Commentated) [OUTDATED] on YouTube

On January 12, 2016, Buchanan uploaded a commentated video in which he explains in depth how to complete the mission "Watch for Rolling Rocks" in "half an A-press". His strategy originally took 14.8 hours from start to finish, most of which were spent using a glitch to accelerate Mario to the high speeds necessary for "parallel universe" movement. This was reduced to 5.4 hours in 2017. The video became popular and was widely spoofed online for its incredibly abstruse and technical content, especially Buchanan's "half A-press" notation (meaning that he began the level with the A-button already held down, which can share a press from a previous level but needs an extra press in an individual-level run) and his use of parallel universes (a collision glitch caused by integer overflow).

On October 1, 2023, Buchanan uploaded an updated video called "Watch for Rolling Rocks in 0 A presses" using a glitch named "Mario's Platform Adventure" documented by Thadortin only a week prior. This strategy also saved time over the previous Watch for Rolling Rocks ABC run in 1:49:16.77 by a runner named Marbler from 10 days earlier. In August 2013, when Buchanan began working on the A-button challenge, over 200 A-presses were required to complete Super Mario 64. As of October 2023, a 120-star playthrough of Super Mario 64 can be completed in as few as 13 A-presses. A 70-star ABC (70ABC) or 98-star max% run can be completed in 0 A-presses, but only on the Wii Virtual Console versions of the game, due to a version-exclusive floating-point rounding error in which certain moving platforms in Bowser in the Fire Sea rise slowly over time, which can be used to save an A-press. A 70-star ABC run has also been completed without tool assistance by Marbler.

=== Impossible coins ===
External videos
- SM64 - Collecting the Impossible Coin on YouTube

In June 2014, Buchanan collected what was known as "the impossible coin", an item hidden in the level "Tiny-Huge Island", which was originally considered impossible to reach. The coin was discovered in 2002 by a GameFAQs message board user named Josiah. Likely due to an oversight by the game's developers, the coin was placed underneath the ground. Buchanan managed to collect it using tool assistance by jumping and kicking on a single frame while moving out of water. He noted that it should be possible to collect the coin without tool assistance, but he added that doing so would be very difficult and require a lot of practice.

In the Super Mario 64 level "Bowser in the Sky", Buchanan discovered a misplaced Goomba located at the bottom of the level, which he dubbed the "mystery Goomba". Since Goombas drop a coin once killed, and the enemy currently seems to be impossible to kill, he called the mystery Goomba's coin the "new" impossible coin. In October 2016, he discovered another impossible coin in "Tiny-Huge Island".

=== Other videos ===
In September 2013, Twitch streamer DOTA_TeaBag encountered a glitch in the Super Mario 64 level "Tick Tock Clock" in which Mario suddenly teleports upwards. In 2015, this "upwarp" caught wider attention, as replicating the glitch could allow players to skip large sections of the game or reduce the required number of A-presses. Buchanan offered a US$1,000 prize to anyone who could recreate the upwarp glitch without modifying the game.

The bounty has yet to be claimed. However, the glitch's effect can be replicated by modifying the game and flipping a single bit of memory. Since no legitimate method for flipping this bit has been found, it has been speculated that in DOTA_TeaBag's case, a single-event upset caused the bit to change. This would mean that it is very unlikely for the glitch to occur again naturally. It has been suggested that a hardware malfunction or electrical interference caused the upwarp, but a definitive cause has not yet been established.

Buchanan started working on a video detailing the workings of Super Mario 64's geometry in summer 2016. He eventually finished this video in May 2017, releasing it under the title "Walls, Floors, & Ceilings". The video details how Mario's movement is measured in the game―it varies depending on whether Mario is located on the ground, in the air, or in water―and how the character interacts with the hitboxes of objects along the way. Buchanan noted that he considers the information in this video "extremely important", as he has been using this information to help him execute or dismiss strategies for years. Gamasutra described this video as a "passionate delve into the most granular details of level design". Since then, two more "Walls, Floors, & Ceilings" videos have been released. In March 2019, Buchanan uploaded a number of "no joystick allowed" videos in which he completes levels in Super Mario 64 without using the controller's analog stick, which is ordinarily how the player moves Mario.

External videos
- SM64’s Invisible Walls Explained Once and for All on YouTube

On April 13, 2024, Buchanan uploaded a video titled "SM64's Invisible Walls Explained Once and for All" in which he explains the many causes and locations of invisible wall-like phenomena in Super Mario 64's stages. With a runtime of just over three hours and forty-five minutes, it is the longest video on the pannenkoek2012 YouTube channel, and, as of July 2025, it has received 7.6 million views, making it the most-viewed video on the channel.

== See also ==
- Kaze Emanuar, another YouTuber known for Super Mario 64 content
- List of YouTubers
