= Kill the Plumber =

2016 video game

- Developer: Keybol
- Series: Mario (unofficial)
- Platforms: Microsoft Windows, iOS, Android, Adobe Flash
- Release: WW: January 1, 2016
- Genre: Platform game
- Mode: Single-player

Kill the Plumber is a platform game developed by Keybol, a video game developer from the Philippines. The game is a parody of Super Mario Bros. Players control the inhabitants of a kingdom invaded by a plumber and must stop him before he can reach a princess. It was released in 2016 for Windows and Android, but Apple rejected it for violating Nintendo's copyright. After the graphics were changed, Apple accepted it.

== Gameplay ==
The game is a parody of Super Mario Bros. in which players, as Mario enemy parodies, attempt to stop a hostile plumber (a parody of Mario). He has invaded their kingdom to stalk a princess (a parody of Princess Peach).

== Development ==
The initial design pitch was to control various enemies from platform games, becoming stronger as the game progressed. The game was initially developed as a browser game. After it proved popular on YouTube, Keybol ported it to mobile platforms. Development for both platforms took a month. However, Apple rejected it from their App Store for potentially violating Nintendo's copyright. While negotiating with Apple, Keybol ported the game to Windows, which took another six weeks of development time.

== Release ==
Kill the Plumber was released on Steam on January 1, 2016. As Kill the Plumber World, it was released on iOS and Android on February 2, 2016. This version of the game features different artwork and is less reminiscent of Nintendo's games.

== Reception ==
Though he criticized the controls and music, Victor Barreiro Jr. of Rappler wrote that the Windows version of Kill the Plumber has a variety of challenging puzzles. Reviewing the iPad version, Harry Slater of Pocket Gamer rated it 6/10 and wrote that it does not live up to the game's intriguing promise of a deconstruction of platform games. At 148apps.com, Campbell Bird rated the iOS version 2.5/5 stars and wrote, "Even though Kill the Plumber has a clever premise, I'm afraid it has little going for it beyond that."
