= Panne =

Panne may refer to:

- Salt pannes and pools
- Panne velvet
- De Panne, a town in Belgium
