= Destiny (streamer) =

American streamer and political commentator (born 1988)

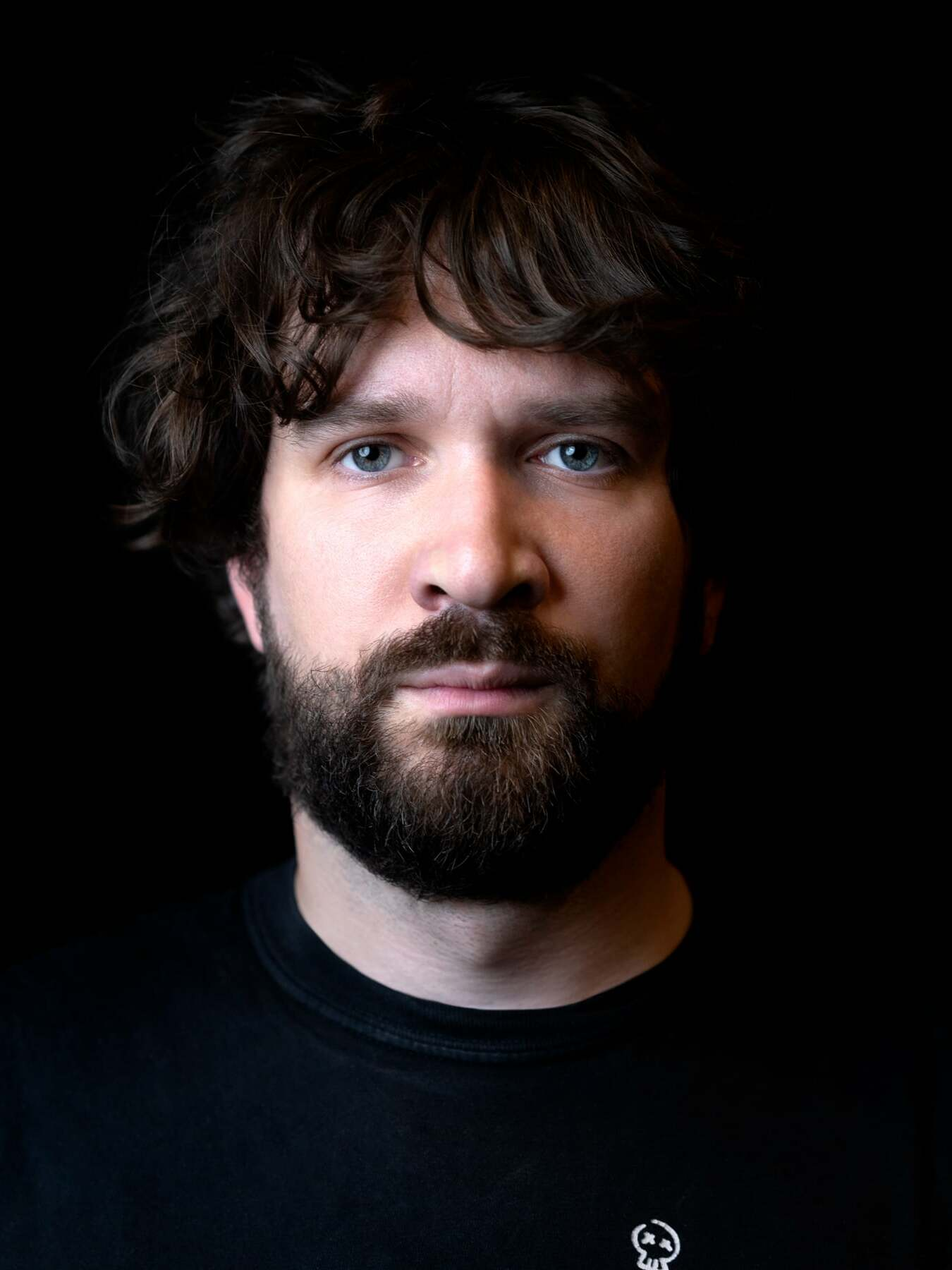
- Bonnell in 2022
- Born: Steven Kenneth Bonnell II; December 12, 1988 (age 37); Omaha, Nebraska, U.S.
- Occupations: Political and social commentator; streamer
- Spouse: Melina Göransson (m. 2021; div. 2023)
- Children: 1

Instagram information
- Page: Steven Bonnell
- Followers: 354 thousand

Kick information
- Channel: Destiny
- Followers: 138.5 thousand

TikTok information
- Page: Destiny
- Followers: 313.7 thousand

Twitch information
- Channel: Destiny
- Years active: 2011–2022
- Genres: Politics; Gaming
- Followers: 699,000 (before his indefinite suspension)

X information
- Handle: @TheOmniLiberal
- Display name: Destiny | Steven Bonnell II
- Years active: 2021–present
- Followers: 307 thousand

YouTube information
- Channel: Destiny
- Years active: 2013–present
- Genres: Political commentary; video gaming
- Subscribers: 874 thousand
- Views: 778 million
- Bonnell's voice Bonnell discusses gender identity during a debate panel. Published March 24, 2021
- Last updated: June 27, 2026
- Website: www.destiny.gg

Signature
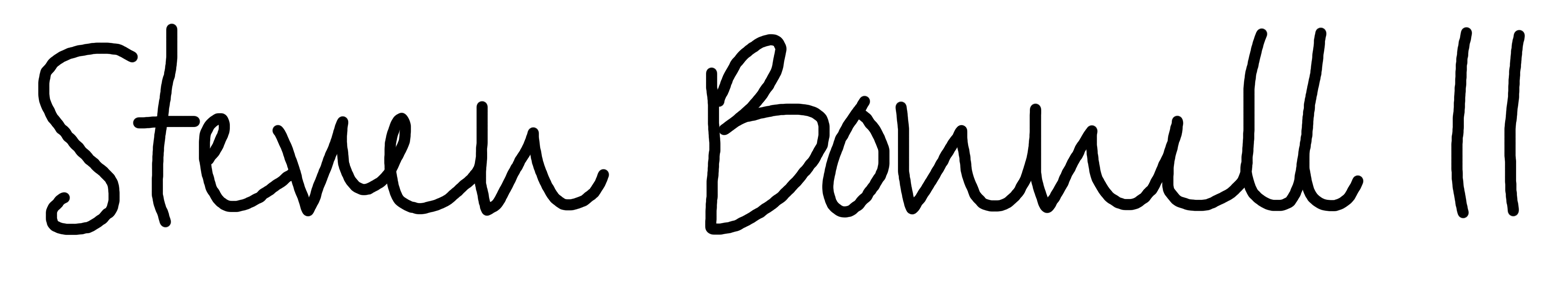

Steven Kenneth Bonnell II (born December 12, 1988), known online as Destiny, is an American live streamer and political commentator. He was among the first people to stream video games online full-time. Since 2016, he has streamed political conversations with other online personalities, in which he advocates for liberal and capitalist policies.

== Early life and education ==
Steven Kenneth Bonnell II was born in Omaha, Nebraska. He was raised in a conservative Catholic home, and he attended Creighton Preparatory School, a private Jesuit high school for boys. He is of Cuban descent from his mother's side of the family. When he was a pre-teen, his mother's home daycare business collapsed, and his family's home was foreclosed. A few years later his parents moved to take care of an aging relative, after which he lived with his grandmother until he was 18.

In 2007, Bonnell enrolled at the University of Nebraska Omaha, where he studied music while working as a restaurant manager at a casino, mostly at night. Struggling to juggle both his education and full-time work, Bonnell dropped out of college in 2010. Within a year, he was fired from his job, which he attributes to his difficulty navigating workplace politics and understanding others' emotional experiences.

Bonnell later found work as a carpet cleaner, working 12-hour days for commission. According to Bonnell, his average pay was $3–4 an hour (equivalent to $4.4–5.9 an hour in 2025).

== Career ==
=== Gaming streaming (2011–2016) ===
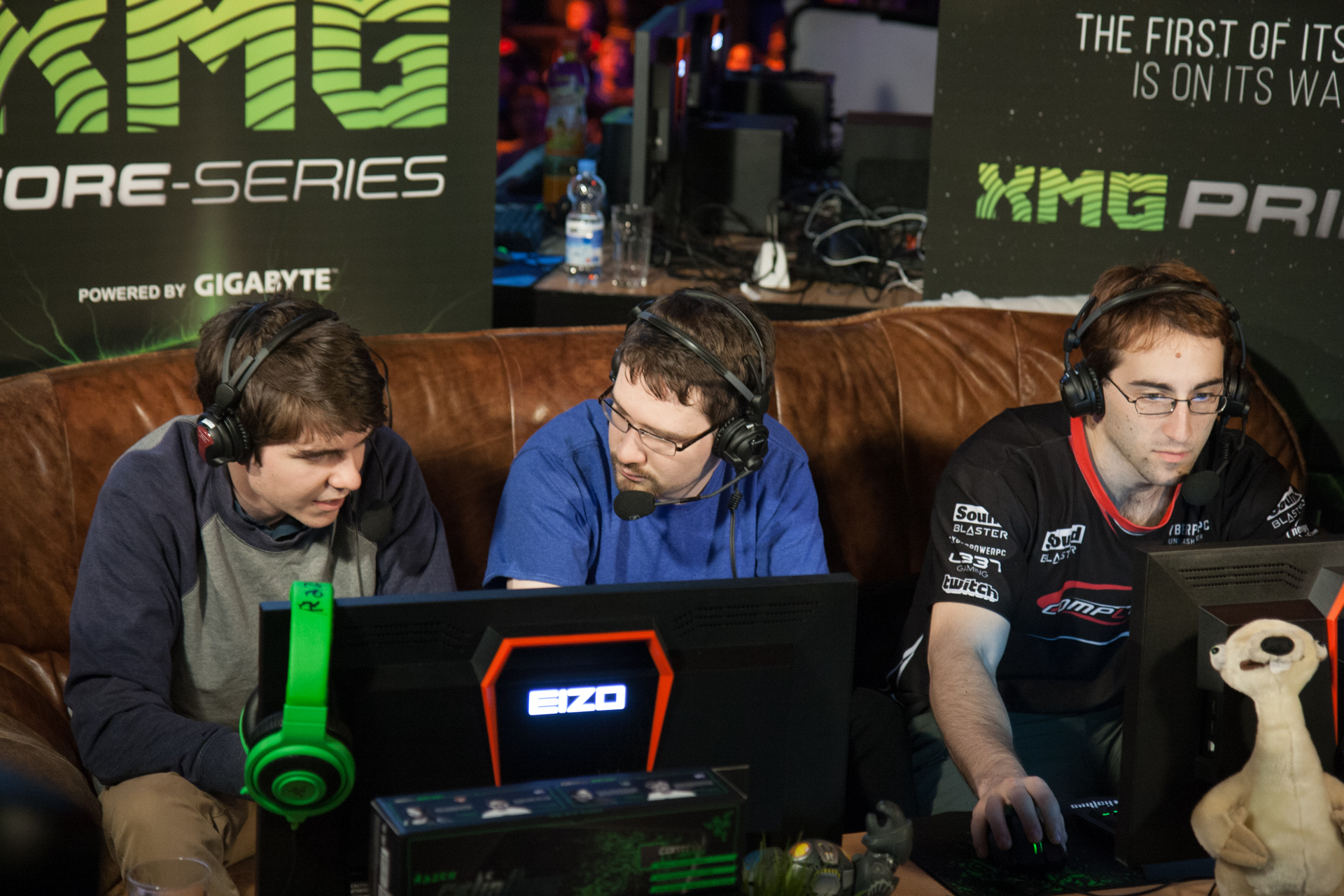
Bonnell (center) at the HomeStory Cup, a tournament for the video game franchise StarCraft, in November 2014

In 2011, Bonnell quit his job as a carpet cleaner to stream video games full-time. Streaming his Starcraft II matches on livestream.com and ustream.tv, then Justin.tv (now Twitch), he was immediately financially successful. In October of that year, Bonnell joined professional team Quantic Gaming and placed 4th in the 2011 MLG Global North American invitational. During his years as a Starcraft II streamer, Bonnell was known for his abrasive and confrontational style, including use of "acerbic and often offensive" comments against other players for shock humor.

=== Twitch debates (2016–2022) ===
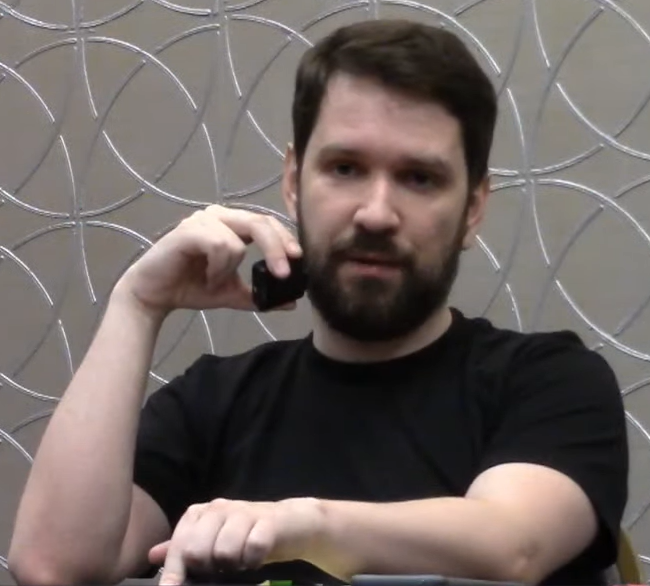
Bonnell at DebateCon in 2022

Starting in 2016, Bonnell live-streamed political debates with other internet personalities. Bonnell debated YouTuber Jon Jafari, better known as JonTron, on immigration and assimilation in March 2017, after Jafari tweeted in support of anti-immigration statements by Republican congressman Steve King. In his debate with Bonnell, Jafari's statements concerning race, crime, and immigration were seen as controversial by viewers, and the subsequent backlash garnered media attention.

Bonnell received a 30-day suspension from Twitch in summer 2018 for using the word faggot. In November 2018, Bonnell and fellow streamer Trihex (Mychal Ramon Jefferson) premiered a political commentary collaboration, The DT Podcast. The podcast streamed its final episode in October 2019, during which Jefferson confronted Bonnell regarding statements the latter had made defending his use of offensive humor—including racial slurs—in private. Fellow Twitch streamer Hasan Piker, who had previously reached out to "form an allegiance", distanced himself from Bonnell in part because of the controversy.

Bonnell was indefinitely banned from Twitch due to "hateful conduct" in March 2022. Bonnell speculated it was due to him expressing the view that "trans women shouldn't compete with cis women in women's athletics".

=== Post-Twitch career (2022–present) ===
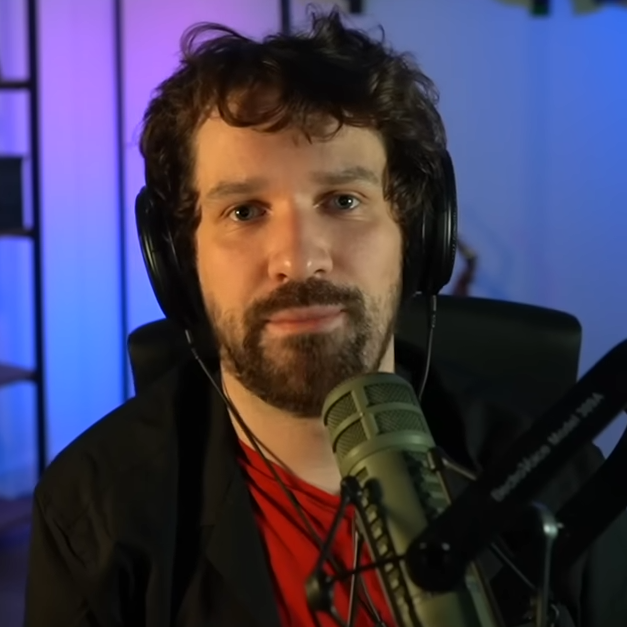
Bonnell on Decoding the Gurus in 2024

In June 2023, Bonnell announced a non-exclusive, twelve-month partnership with the livestreaming platform Kick, reported to be worth seven figures, though the amount was not disclosed. Bonnell interviewed U.S. Representative Ro Khanna, alongside other political streamers such as Vaush, Emma Vigeland (co-host of The Majority Report), and Keffals, about various topics in September 2023, including the importance of youth political participation and ways to push progressive political sentiment, as well as asking questions about Khanna. Beginning in early 2024, Bonnell began co-hosting the Bridges and Anything Else? podcasts.

In late 2024, members of Bonnell's Reddit and Discord communities began participating in an online campaign against Twitch, pressuring Twitch advertisers under the allegation that the website was promoting antisemitic content. Some activists of the campaign were led by Dan Saltman, an online commentator and Bonnell's podcast co-host, who has launched multiple gripe sites that targeted Twitch's CEO Dan Clancy and Amazon vice-president Steve Boom. Saltman stated that "The goal of our campaign is simple: The CEO, Dan Clancy stepping down."

Bonnell has stated that his personal involvement in the campaign has been minimal. According to Bloomberg writer Cecilia D'Anastasio, both Bonnell and Saltman's fans harassed multiple Twitch employees, including members of the company's trust and safety department. Critics of the campaign also accused Bonnell and Saltman of harassing female journalists. Saltman was ultimately banned from Twitch in November due to the stated reason of "extreme harassment". In response, Saltman stated that "allegations of harassment are often made by people who have been exposed for their bigotry, sexism and hatred."

Bonnell held live conversations with several candidates during the 2025 Democratic National Committee chairmanship election. Those interviewed included Wisconsin Democratic Party Chair Ben Wikler, former Maryland governor Martin O'Malley, New York State Senator James Skoufis and 2020 presidential candidate Marianne Williamson. Later that March, Bonnell interviewed Virginian politician Jessica Anderson. Anderson was running for the 71st district in Virginia's House of Delegates election, a seat she eventually won that November. Bonnell has additionally interviewed Miguel Cardona and Gina Raimondo, former United States Education and Commerce secretaries respectively. (Note: Bonnell, Steven (January 16, 2026). "Talking With The 12th Secretary of Education Miguel Cardona" – via YouTube.) (Note: Bonnell, Steven (November 13, 2026). "Are The Democrats LOST?" – via YouTube.)

In 2025, Bonnell joined the Unfuck America Tour, a progressive political campus event series hosted by National Ground Game, an organization founded by political consultant Zee Cohen-Sanchez. The tour aims at countering Turning Point USA and rallying youth votes for the Democratic Party. In 2026, he interviewed multiple prominent political personalities, including Bill Kristol, Francis Fukuyama and Garry Kasparov.

== Political positions ==
Bonnell identified as a libertarian, anti-social justice warrior "with right-of-center social beliefs" until 2012, when his political outlook began shifting toward liberalism after an incident in which he heard another streamer use a homophobic slur. Bonnell has argued against certain aspects of both far-right and far-left politics. Furthermore, he has promoted the idea that college campuses should have students who have diverse opinions in order to reduce polarization.

Bonnell has stated that his intention is not to persuade his opponents but to persuade the audience; although he has expressed that airing his opinions often feels "like screaming into the void", he estimates he has received hundreds of emails from former members of the alt-right crediting him for their conversion to left-wing politics. Subsequent journalistic and academic coverage of right-wing YouTube commentary has credited Bonnell as an early and effective opposition to it, particularly owing to his provocative, combative debate style which appeals to right-wing gaming audiences. Bonnell has cited his poverty during his teenage and college-aged years as an influence on his views and says that he prefers to argue based on empirical data rather than moral suasion.

=== Political violence ===
Bonnell was notified in September 2020 that his Twitch partnership agreement would be terminated the following month for "encouragement of violence". The termination came as a result of comments made on-stream after the Kenosha unrest shooting, when Bonnell said:

"The rioting needs to fucking stop, and if that means like white redneck fucking militia dudes out there mowing down dipshit protesters that think that they can torch buildings at ten p.m., then at this point they have my fucking blessing, because holy shit, this fucking shit needs to stop, it needed to stop a long time ago."

After the first 2024 assassination attempt of Donald Trump, which killed one Trump rally attendee and injured two others, Bonnell stated that Trump and his supporters "reap what they sow, and I'm here to watch the harvest". The Economist cited Bonnell as an example of an "angry progressive" who "lamented" that the attempt had failed.

=== Israeli–Palestinian conflict ===
Following the 2023 Hamas attack on Israel, Bonnell expressed support for Israel. He said, "The Palestinians are oppressed by all the Arab countries, and no country from them, which is supposed to be on 'their' side, has bothered to offer them a real solution—and yet, their anger is directed fully at Israel, and unjustifiably in my opinion." He added that the support for Hamas within Gaza was understandable, but it was "not an informed decision but one of distress". In a debate with Nathan J. Robinson, Bonnell argued against the Palestinian right of return, believing it would make peace and a two-state solution impossible.

In March 2024, Bonnell debated the Israeli–Palestinian conflict and the Gaza war on the Lex Fridman Podcast with political scientist Norman Finkelstein, political analyst Mouin Rabbani, and historian Benny Morris, with Bonnell representing the pro-Israel side alongside Morris. Bonnell and Finkelstein had heated exchanges during the debate. He has criticized streamer Hasan Piker, including Piker's criticism of Israel.

=== Economics ===
In 2019, Bonnell began publicly debating in favor of capitalism against socialists and communists. In 2021, he debated Marxian economist Richard D. Wolff, with Bonnell defending capitalism. Bonnell described the label of "socialism" as poorly defined and noted a history of famine and abuses in countries like the Soviet Union and China, while Wolff responded by disputing Bonnell's characterization of his views on socialism throughout the debate. Matthew Gault, in an article for Vice, wrote that Bonnell and Wolff spent the majority of the debate "arguing over the basic definitions of capitalism and socialism".

== Canvassing ==
In 2020, Bonnell supported the general election campaign of Joe Biden. Following Biden's victory, Bonnell led a canvassing campaign in support of Democratic candidates Jon Ossoff and Raphael Warnock in the 2020–21 Georgia Senate runoffs. With the help of approximately 140 volunteers mobilized from Bonnell's online audience, the campaign knocked on an estimated 17,500–20,000 doors in Columbus, Georgia, making it one of the larger campaigns of the election. Bonnell led another canvassing operation in support of Mark Gudgel for the 2021 Omaha mayoral election. On March 3, 2021, Gudgel officially cut ties with Bonnell over the latter's statements regarding riots at the George Floyd protests.

In 2024, Bonnell, who endorsed Kamala Harris during the 2024 United States presidential election, debated right-wing YouTuber John Doyle, who endorsed Donald Trump. In February 2024, Bonnell spearheaded canvassing efforts by political activist group Progressive Victory in Cincinnati, Ohio, to support Sherrod Brown in the 2024 Ohio Senate race.

== Personal life ==
Bonnell lived in Nebraska before relocating to the Los Angeles area in December 2018. In late 2021, he moved to Miami, Florida.

Bonnell has been married twice and has a son. He is openly bisexual, and his second marriage was an open marriage with Swedish streamer Melina Göransson. Bonnell and Göransson married in December 2021. They separated and filed for divorce in December 2023.

=== Legal troubles ===
In February 2025, a federal lawsuit was filed in the Southern District of Florida alleging that Bonnell shared a sexual video of fellow political streamer "Pxie" without her consent or knowledge, violating a federal revenge porn law and Florida's law against cyber sexual harassment. Prior to the filing of the suit, Bonnell publicly commented that the intimate video had been shared with third parties due to a leak that "happened without my knowledge, consent, or authorization". After the suit was filed, Bonnell released a longer public statement addressing the allegations. Pxie's lawsuit additionally names two other women who "have recently come forward and publicly alleged that Bonnell has released sexually explicit videos of them without their consent".
