= Video game collecting =

Hobby

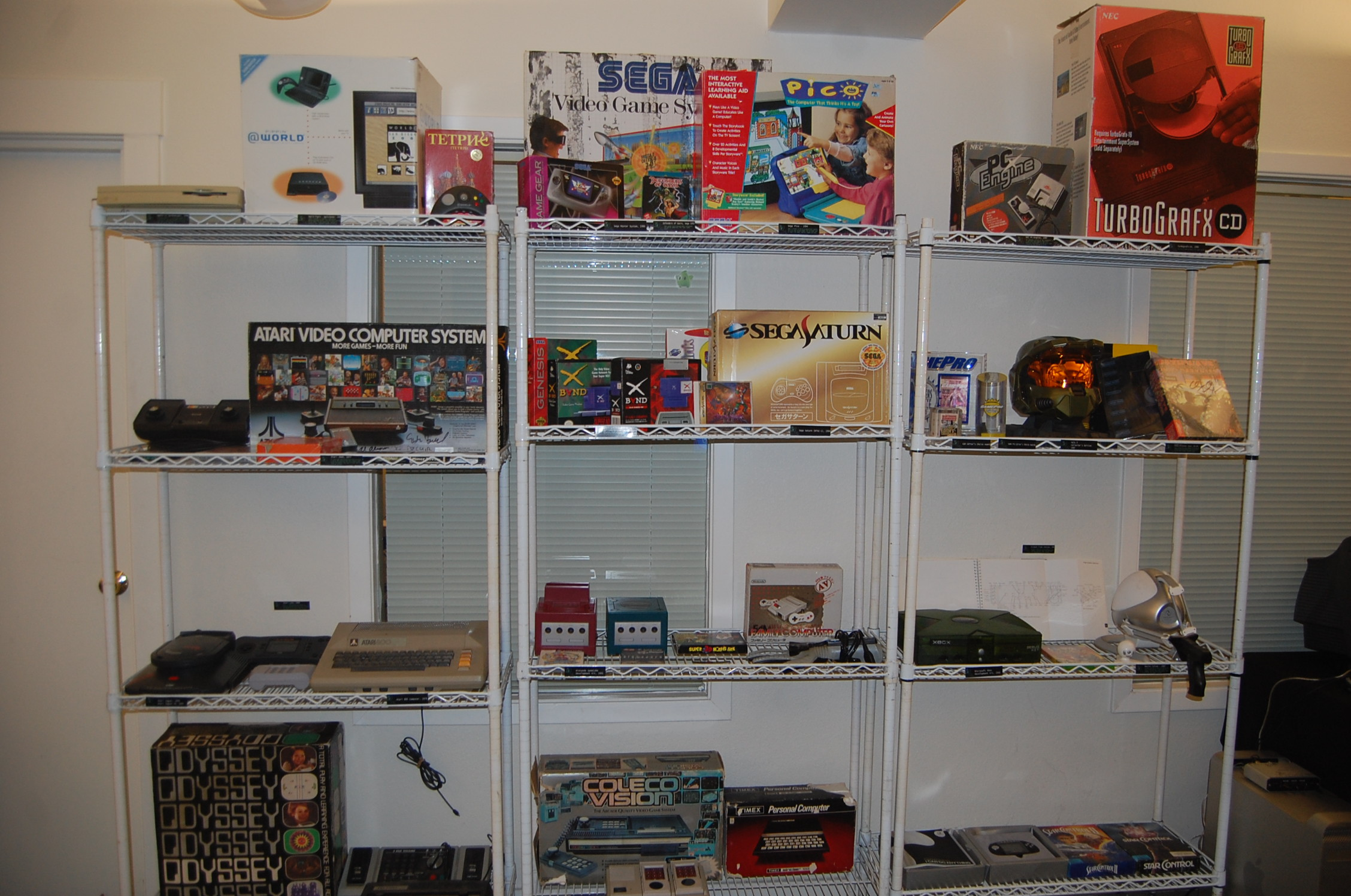
A collection of video game consoles, accessories, and memorabilia

Video game collecting is the hobby of collecting and preserving video games, video game consoles, and related memorabilia. Most video game consoles, and their games, are considered to be collector's items years after their discontinuation due to their functional longevity and cultural significance. Collectors usually narrow their search to games holding characteristics they enjoy, such as being published for a specific video game console, being of certain genre, or featuring a specific character.

Since around 2019, there has been more interest in collection of video games from outside video game players related to sealed copies of games often from early publications, leading to development of rating systems for game condition and auctioning systems. Sealed games in near perfect condition have sold from $100,000 to over $1 million since then, though the legitimacy of this new market has been questioned by hobbyists, game journalists and developers of said games alike.

== History ==
=== Early years (up to 2017) ===
Efforts by video game historians have worked to assure that older video games are preserved in playable forms, often through emulation on modern hardware, to allow researchers, developers, and players to explore the history of the genre. Separately, there had generally been some interest in collecting older game media such as video game cartridges among video game enthusiasts, with selling and trading using Internet auction sites like eBay growing in the early 2000s. As players got older, games from the consoles of their childhood often gained "retro" status, typically around 15 to 20 years after release, making not only playable versions of those games valuable, but also raising the perceived value of games still within their original packaging.

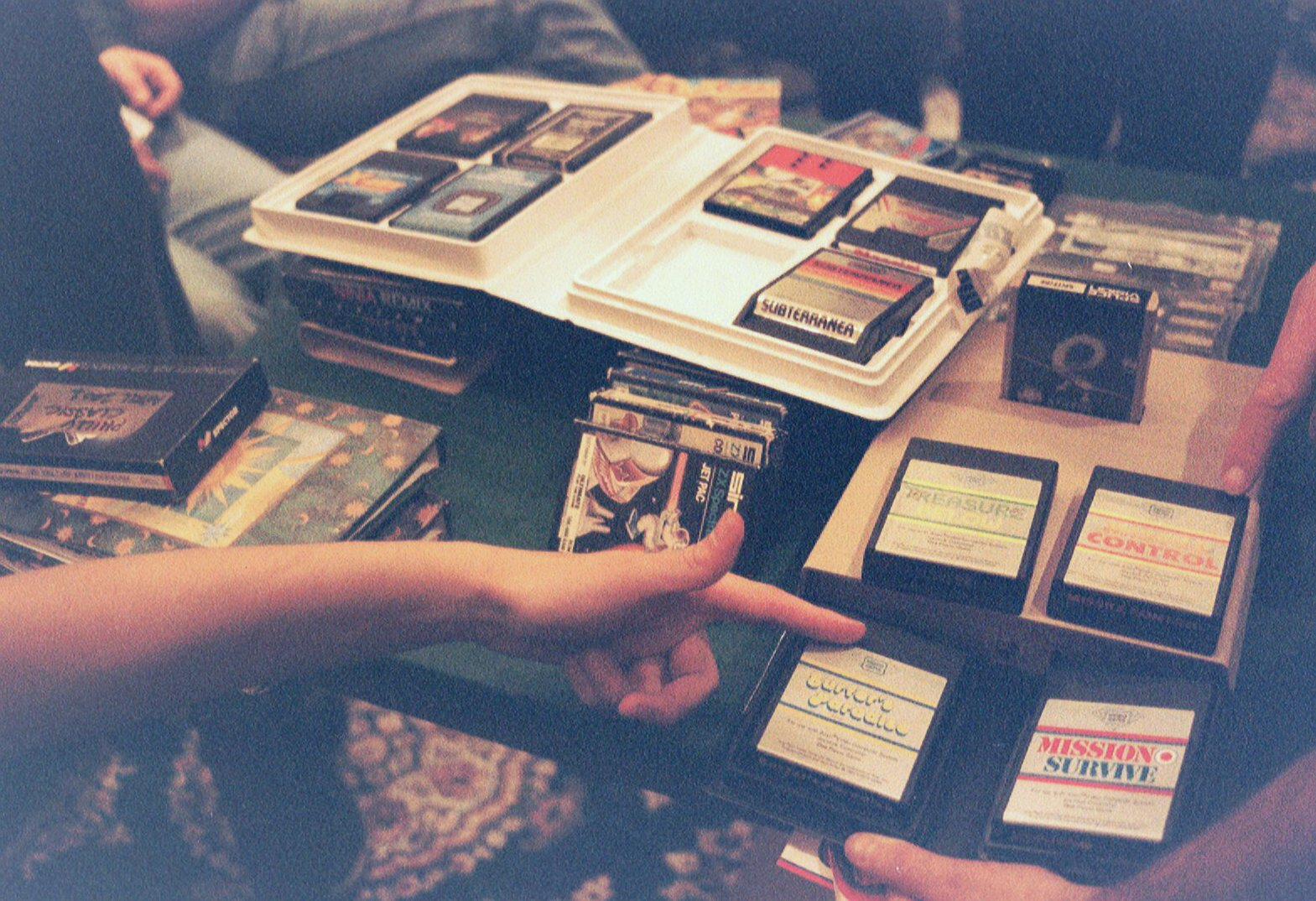
Rare video games on display at a retro gaming convention in 2001

Collectors started recognizing that numerous games from the past were rare and considered collector's items and many were vying with others to complete a full set of titles for a specific platform, commonly the Nintendo Entertainment System (NES). At this time, prices for games were generally low as collectors did not care greatly about packaging or conditions of a game as long as it worked, and primarily the rarity of a title was the largest factor into the perceived value for a game. Various third-party assessors entered the market around this time to support the collectors in rating the condition of the game and packaging so that buyers and sellers could negotiate fair deals. For example, the Video Game Authority was a division spun off from the Collectible Grading Authority in 2008 specifically to aid in the assessment of video games.

Larger interest in this hobby grew during the 2010s, driven by collectors from other forms of media like comics and coin collecting that saw video games as a potential new venue for long-term investments, rather than as nostalgia. This created both benefits and drawbacks for long-time collectors. The larger interest led to the discovery of troves of older games in near mint condition, often still in the sealed packaging, which became desirable collector's items, but at the same time, the demand for these games elevated the prices that games went for at auction sales, raising the cost of collecting. Further, these collectors from outside of the video game area did not recognize the value of certain titles as key moments in video game history and instead considered all titles equally valuable, further affecting the costs of the hobby.

=== Wata Games, Heritage Auctions, and booming sales (2018–present) ===
With the newfound interest with particular attention to the quality of the game's packaging, the company Wata Games developed a set of guidelines in 2018 for grading a game's packaging, game media, and manuals that aligned with the 10 point scale used by Comics Guaranty for comic books and other similar industry standards. A 10.0 grade on Wata's scale is considered a perfect mint condition game. Wata also provides clear plexiglass packaging for displaying and shipping the game as well as labeling related to its rating, to help preserve the condition of the game and packaging. With Wata's ratings and "slabbed" packaging, Heritage Auctions began accepting video games as part of their auctioned items in January 2019. With the volume of games Wata Games were receiving to review from interested sellers who did not have deep knowledge of the industry, the Video Game History Foundation contracted Wata Games to provide them with information on any game prototypes and rare games that they may evaluate to help expand the Foundation's databases.

The introduction of Wata's professional service in 2018 to qualify the state of a video game and its packaging led to more interest from other collectors who saw video games as a non-traditional asset and/or pop culture art such as comics and trading cards. Over the next several years, several prior records related to auction prices for video games were rapidly broken. In February 2019, Heritage Auctions sold a near-mint copy of Super Mario Bros. with a 9.4 Wata rating that went for just over US$100,000 (equivalent to $125,927 in 2025), at the time the highest sale of a video game at its time. The copy of the game had been sealed with a sticker, representing one of the earlier runs of the title before Nintendo had switched over to shrink wrap packaging, thus contributing to its collector's value. This sale was reported on by the news and drew further interest into the video game collecting field. Heritage's sales in the video game area grew greatly in 2019, holding hundreds of video game auctions with 13 games going for at least US$10,000. A sale of 40 different NES games in various sealed quality went for a total of over US$1 million in October 2019, the largest single-sale of any video game-related auction to date.

In July 2020, a sealed copy of Super Mario Bros. sold for US$114,000 (equivalent to $141,822 in 2025), becoming the highest sale of a single video game at the time. The game also had a 9.4 near-mint condition on the Wata scale, but had come from a limited production run when Nintendo was transitioning from the sticker seal to shrink-wrap, as evidenced by the presence of a cardboard hang tab on the back.

A 9.8 rated copy of Super Mario Bros., also with the hang tag packaging, was purchased by Rally Rd. for US$140,000 (equivalent to $174,167 in 2025) in a private sale in August 2020, which they plan to offer "shares" of US$50 increments to investors towards a potential future sale while keeping the sealed game itself secured in an environment-controlled vault. A 9.2 rated copy of Super Mario Bros. 3, featuring an early print of the game's cover, sold for over US$156,000 (equivalent to $194,072 in 2025) in November 2020. A shrink-wrapped, 9.6-rated version of Super Mario Bros., dating from the game's release during the 1986 launch of the NES in the United States, was auctioned for $660,000 (equivalent to $784,170 in 2025) in April 2021.

Two auctions of sealed games by Heritage in July 2021 broke prior records by significant amounts. A sealed copy of The Legend of Zelda, believed to be one of the first printings of the game according to Heritage Auctions and thus making it one of the rarest copies of the game, was auctioned for $890,000 (equivalent to $1,057,442 in 2025). A few days later, a sealed copy of one of the first printings of Super Mario 64, rated 9.8 on Wata's scale, one of only five game copies rated this high, sold at auction for $1,560,000 (equivalent to $1,853,494 in 2025). These sales led to some concern that the market for near-mint vintage games may be grossly inflated, since sealed copies of the first printing Super Mario 64 were not considered as rare as previous record-breaking titles. By comparison, a Super Mario 64 package rated at 9.4 on Wata's scale had sold at auction for only $28,800 during the same auction period. While there is an expected exponential increase in perceived value with a higher rated game, the jump between these two examples was considered unusual. Video game historian Frank Cifaldi said "I 100% agree it being a 9.8 puts it at a completely different level but a sudden jump from $30k to $1.5M feels wrong." It is believed that those purchasing these sealed games at high prices are speculative collectors of other types of memorabilia, working on the principles of perceived value established there, rather than from gamers that would place more emphasis on a game title's rarity or other similar factors. The involvement of third parties, such as Wata Games and Heritage Auctions, may have contributed to the inflated value of these games, compared to when this was done between hobbyist collectors. A class action lawsuit was filed against Wata claiming the company has manipulated the collecting market.

The Rally Rd. copy of Super Mario Bros. later was auctioned again in August 2021 for $2 million. A copy of Super Mario Bros., confirmed by Heritage Auctions to be a rare sealed item from the game's second publication run, rated 9.6 by Wata, sold for $3 million in June 2026.

Wata Games was acquired by Collectors Universe, a company that specializes in grading coins, collectible cards, and other memorabilia, in July 2021. In September 2025, it was announced that the Wata Games brand would be absorbed by Professional Sports Authenticator (PSA), another grading company owned by Collectors Universe.

=== Game forgeries and bootlegs ===
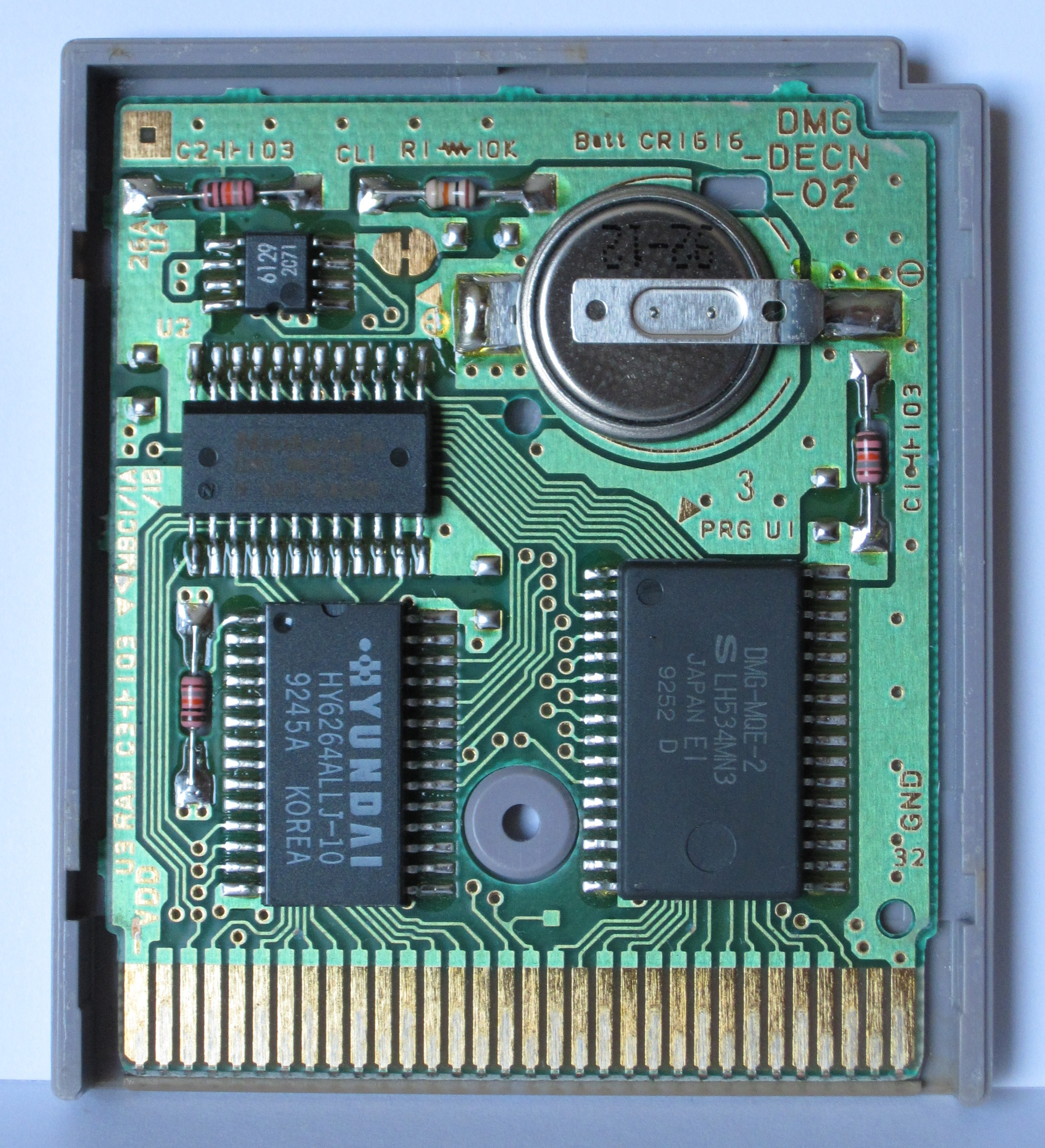
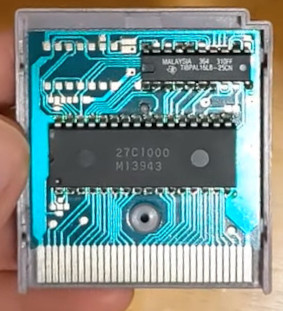
Example interiors of genuine (left) and counterfeit (right) Game Boy cartridges

While most video game collection is focused on console games, there is still a smaller market around older personal computer games predating 2000 which were boxed and sold with additional materials. These games, such as the earlier games in the Ultima series, originally sold around $10, could sell for hundreds of dollars depending on rarity. According to Joe McCoy, the founder of the Big Box PC Game Collectors group, the speculative market interests around console gaming collection had begun to spread into PC game boxes since some titles were known to be rare. This led to the discovery of at least one vector introduced forgeries into PC game collecting market of comparatively rare games. The forger, identified as Enrico Ricciardi, would use cracked versions of the games without copy protection or other similar features, then otherwise assemble the game package with duplicates of the manuals and other contents to make it appear legitimate. These forged copies had entered the market around 2015 and the forgeries discovered around 2022, which caused a major dent in the value of the collection of some of the consumers involved in this area, with an estimated $100,000 drop in value overall due to the forgeries.

A separate issue for console games is the existence of bootleg games, where the packaging has been replicated as closely as possible to the legitimate game, but contain an illegitimate or clone copy of the software. Such a practice had been seen emerging from the Game Boy Pokémon games, with bootleggers capturing on the popularity of the series at that time. Bootleg copies, from a collecting standpoint, have no significant value, but the effort to make the game appear as legitimate in online auctions have fooled several collectors. A Reddit subforum, r/gameverifying, has voluntarily issued guides for collections as to what to watch for when purchasing games and looking for possible bootleg versions.

== Rare games ==
While all video games can be seen as collectible, some are noteworthy for being particularly rare or desirable, which in turn contributes to high values. Prices may vary depending on the condition of the packaging, paperwork, whether the item is sealed, how many inserts are retained, and whether the spine card is still present. Sealed games can be worth twice as much as opened ones, for example, even if the open one is in good shape and includes all the manuals and other contents.

The most expensive video games sold at auction have belonged to series with the greatest recognized value, such as Mario Bros or The Legend of Zelda. This is often due to collectors who do not play video games themselves but recognize the popularity and potential value of rare, unsealed copies purchasing the games, despite millions of copies having been published.

For video game collectors that are also players, there is recognition of games that are far less notable due either their obscurity or having limited production runs, making the rarity of the game itself valuable, rather than the condition of the game. Notable rare games include:

- Air Raid (1982), Atari 2600, NTSC-U. The game cartridge has a distinctive t-shaped handle. Only 12 copies are known to exist. The only copy with package known to exist sold for $31,600 in 2010.
- Pepsi Invaders (1983), Atari 2600, NTSC-U. 125 copies produced.
- Red Sea Crossing (1983), Atari 2600, NTSC-U. 2 known copies. Produced by Steve Sack, Inc of Inspirational Video Concepts. The yard sale copy found in 2007 was sold on GameGavel for $10,400.00 in a 2012 auction. Another copy was found in Philadelphia and was eventually auctioned off on eBay for $13,800 in 2013
- Stadium Events (1987), NES, NTSC-U. Considered the rarest licensed NES game available for purchase in North America. The game's packaging alone has been known to sell for $10,000. One of two known sealed copies was sold for $22,800 on eBay.
- Tetris (1989), Sega Mega Drive, NTSC-J. Three to eight copies produced, supposedly due to copyright issues.
- Nintendo World Championships (1990), NES, NTSC-U. 26 copies of the gold cartridge and 90 copies for the standard gray cartridge. The gray carts were the actual carts used in the Nintendo World Championships tournament while the gold carts were prizes for winning a Nintendo Power sweepstakes. Gold cartridges have sold for over $10,000. The game has been called the rarest and most valuable NES cartridge released aside from promotional cartridges.
- Nintendo Campus Challenge (1991, 1992), NES, NTSC-U. Most copies were destroyed after competitions, except one copy which was sold to Rob Walters in 2006. The copy is believed to be the only one in existence, eventually selling for $20,100 on eBay.
- Nintendo PowerFest '94 (1994), SNES, NTSC-U. 33 cartridges made, only two known to still exist.
- Virtual Bowling/SD Gundam Dimension War (1995), Virtual Boy, NTSC-J. The two rare games make completing the Japanese Virtual Boy collection difficult.
- Kizuna Encounter (1996), Neo Geo, PAL. Fewer than 12 copies exist. However, the Japanese and US AES version is not as rare and is identical except for the packaging and inserts.
- The Ultimate 11 (1996), Neo Geo. 10 known copies. Also known as Tokuten Oh: Honoo no Libero. One buyer reportedly paid $55,000 for both Kizuna Encounter and Ultimate 11.
- Bangai-O: Prize Edition (1999), Sega Dreamcast, NTSC-J. Five copies produced.
- JoJo's Bizarre Adventure: All Star Battle Exquisite Edition (2013), PlayStation 3. One available, includes the game, special packaging and a Swarovski figurine made out of 6000 Swarovski crystals. The game was auctioned at eBay for £687.
- Panzer Dragoon Saga (Sega Saturn, 1998) was released in limited quantities in the west; as of 2017, used copies sold for hundreds of US dollars and factory-sealed copies for over $1,000. Japanese copies are far cheaper, but have no English translation and cannot be played on western Saturn consoles.
- Lucienne's Quest (3DO, 1995) is the sole Japanese role-playing game released for the 3DO, and has gained recognition as one of the best games for the system. Its limited western release has led to high demand and prices.
- Ginga Fukei Densetsu Sapphire (PC Engine, 1995) is considered one of the best shoot 'em ups for the PC Engine, and was released in limited quantities exclusively in Japan.
- Shinrei Jusatsushi Tarōmaru (Sega Saturn, 1997) was the last game released by Time Warner Interactive. Only 7,500 copies were produced.
- Physical copies of Fortnite (2017) for PlayStation 4 and Xbox One have become desirable after its developer Epic Games introduced and focused more attention on the free Fortnite: Battle Royale mode. The original game mode of Fortnite, now named Fortnite: Save the World, was made into a secondary mode for Fortnite available digitally, making the console copies rare.

== See also ==
- Limited Run Games
