= Michael Jefferson =

Michael or Mike Jefferson may refer to:

- Michael Jefferson, a contestant from Survivor: One World
- Michael Jefferson (American football) (born 1999), football wide receiver
- Mike Jefferson (American football) (born 1982), football wide receiver
- Mike Danton (né Jefferson, born 1980), former ice hockey player
- Trihex (Michael Ramon Jefferson), American esports player and streamer
- Michael Jefferson Michael Jefferson, American Esports Instructor
- The fake name of a character in the South Park episode "The Jeffersons".
