= Nintendo Campus Challenge =

Video game competition by Nintendo

Nintendo Campus Challenge was a video game competition sponsored by Nintendo and held at nearly 60 college campuses and other events throughout the United States. There was also a Canadian Tour. There were two Campus Challenge events, one in 1991 and another in 1992.

== 1991 games ==
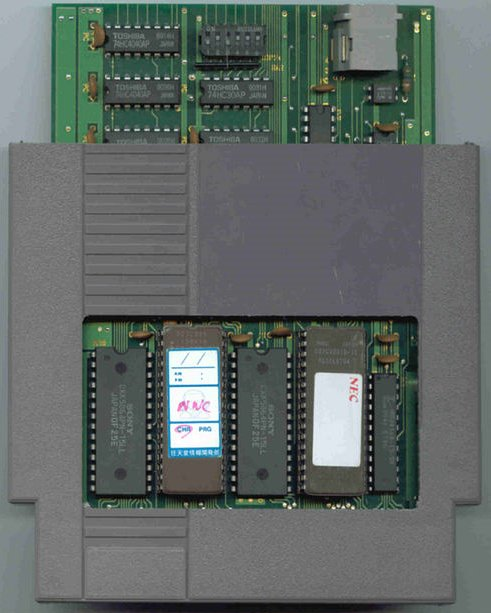
Nintendo Campus Challenge 1991 cartridge

Like Nintendo World Championships, the official event gave each player 6 minutes and 21 seconds to play in the contest, but there are three different minigames. The first minigame of the competition is Super Mario Bros. 3, where players must collect 25 coins. The next minigame is a version of Pin Bot, where players must get 100,000 points. The final minigame is Dr. Mario, which lasts until the time expires. Once time expires, a player's score is totaled using the following formula:

- Super Mario Bros. 3 score times 10
- + PinBot score
- + Dr. Mario score times 100

The following advertisement was printed in Game Players Strategy Guide to Nintendo Games Vol. 4, issue #5:

"Ok, you should really be studying for that calculus test next week. And there's a paper due in English Lit. But who cares? The Nintendo Campus Challenge is coming! Nintendo of America is following up its hugely successful Nintendo World Champions with its first Nintendo Campus Challenge. During the next year, competitions will be held at 50 universities and popular spring break gatherings throughout the U.S. One lucky student will become the 'college valedictorian of videogames.' Contestants will play a special combination of three Nintendo games - Dr. Mario, Rad Racer, and Super Mario Bros. 3. There are categories for both men and women, and all finalists receive round-trip airfare to the January 1992 championship. Prizes include new cars and cash scholarships. Meanwhile, don't let those grades slide too badly."

Rad Racer was not used in the final version of the competition cartridge, as it had previously appeared on the Nintendo World Championships cartridge and that both games used a different mapper chip from what the 1991 Nintendo Campus Challenge uses.

=== Cartridge ===
There is only one original copy of the 1991 Campus Challenge cartridge known to exist. The game was found by a video game collector, Rob Walters, at a garage sale in New York in 2006. The game sold for $14,000 in July 2009 to collector JJ Hendricks. After 3 months, Hendricks resold the game on eBay for $20,100.

The cartridge is known to have been utilized in the 1991 Campus Challenge. However, it was also used in the French 'Nintendo Super Tour 1992', and a competition in Scandinavia in the same year.

=== Event structure ===
The Nintendo Campus Challenge 1991 was held at 58 college campuses and spring break locations over a year's time starting in November 1990. The event consisted of three stages. The main stage had the competition on 12 different game stations. The second stage was Nintendo Entertainment System systems with various games while the third stage had Game Boy systems. Attendees at the events could play as many times as they wanted and the highest score at the end of the day was announced the winner.

The winner from each location was flown to Walt Disney World in Orlando, Florida over New Year's weekend in January 1992. All the competitors played in the first round followed by a second round with the six highest scoring players only. The final round was a head-to-head match between Steve Lucas and Matt Sekelsky. Steve Lucas won with a score of 2,394,130.

Date	School	City
11/29/1990	Louisiana State University	Baton Rouge
12/3/1990	Texas A&M University	College Station
12/6/1990	University of Oklahoma	Norman
1/10/1991	Consumer Electronics Show	Las Vegas
1/15/1991	California Polytechnic State University (Cal Poly)	San Luis Obispo
1/17/1991	University of California, Santa Barbara	Santa Barbara
1/21/1991	University of California, Los Angeles	Los Angeles
1/24/1991	University of Southern California	Los Angeles
1/28/1991	California State University, Long Beach	Long Beach
1/31/1991	University of California, Irvine	Irvine
2/4/1991	California State University, Fullerton	Fullerton
2/7/1991	San Diego State University	San Diego
2/11/1991	University of Nevada, Las Vegas	Las Vegas
2/14/1991	Arizona State University	Tempe
2/18/1991	University of Arizona	Tucson
2/21/1991	University of New Mexico	Albuquerque
2/25/1991	Texas Tech University	Lubbock
2/28/1991	University of Texas at Arlington	Arlington
3/4/1991	University of Texas at Austin	Austin
3/7/1991	University of Houston	Houston
3/11/1991	Spring Break event	South Padre Island
3/19/1991	Spring Break event	Kenny Dedic - Daytona Beach
3/25/1991	Spring Break event	Daytona Beach
4/4/1991	University of Georgia	Athens
4/8/1991	Georgia Institute of Technology	Atlanta
4/11/1991	Auburn University	Auburn
4/15/1991	University of Alabama	Tuscaloosa
4/18/1991	University of Tennessee at Knoxville	Knoxville
4/22/1991	Ohio State University	Columbus
4/24/1991	Chevy Open House	General Motors Technical Center; Warren, Michigan
4/25/1991	University of Michigan	Ann Arbor
4/29/1991	Indiana University	Bloomington
5/2/1991	University of Wisconsin–Madison	Madison
5/6/1991	University of Minnesota	Minneapolis
5/9/1991	Northwestern University	Evanston
8/2/1991	Ohio State Fair	Columbus
8/15/1991	Illinois State Fair	Springfield
8/22/1991-9/20/1991	Canada Tour	Canada
9/23/1991	University at Albany	Albany
9/26/1991	University of Massachusetts Amherst	Amherst
9/30/1991	Boston University	Boston
10/3/1991	University of Rhode Island	Kingston
10/7/1991	New York University	New York City
10/10/1991	Rutgers University–New Brunswick	New Brunswick
10/14/1991	University of Pennsylvania	Philadelphia
10/17/1991	University of Maryland	College Park
10/20/1991	West Virginia University	Morgantown
10/24/1991	University of North Carolina at Chapel Hill	Chapel Hill
10/28/1991	Clemson University	Clemson
11/11/1991	University of Washington	Seattle
11/13/1991	Nintendo Open House	Seattle
11/18/1991	University of Oregon	Eugene
11/27/1991	California State University, Sacramento	Sacramento
12/2/1991	University of California, Berkeley	Berkeley
12/5/1991	Stanford University	Stanford
12/9/1991	San Jose State University	San Jose
1/4/1992	Walt Disney World	Orlando

== 1992 games ==
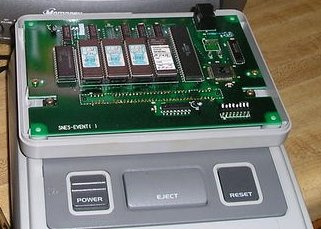
Nintendo Campus Challenge 1992 Cartridge

The SNES Campus Challenge cart has an unusual shape, with the PCB parallel to the SNES. The cart has four ROM chips, presumably three for each game plus the additional one to link them all together. It also has the DSP-1 chip, which is used in Pilotwings. There is a set of eight switches, which were likely used to adjust the settings in the game, although they seemed to have no effect when changed. A phone jack is present, likely to relay the scores to a Nintendo server to determine the grand prize winner.

The rules are the same as the 1991 version, except with three SNES minigames. The first minigame of the competition is Super Mario World, where players must collect 50 coins (very similar to Nintendo World Championships' first minigame, Super Mario Bros.). The second game is a version of F-Zero, where players must complete two laps. The final minigame is Pilotwings, where players must land on two targets successfully. Once time expires, a player's score is totaled using the following formula:

- Super Mario World score
- + F-Zero score times 100
- + Pilotwings score times 10,000

=== Cartridge ===
There are reportedly three cartridges in existence, but only two are known. One was found at the same New York garage sale by Rob Walters as the 1991 cartridge. The cartridge is owned by a video game collector named Rick Bruns. The second one was found in the attic of a former employee of a company that did projects for Nintendo. Nintendo sent the cartridge to the company along with some systems and other games.

The cartridge is also known to have been used in the French 'Nintendo Super Tour 1992', and a Scandinavian-based competition the same year.

=== Event structure ===
The 1992 "Nintendo Campus Challenge" competition was held at 35 college campuses throughout the US, including Central Michigan University, Arizona State University, and Texas A&M University. The winner at each location won a Super NES console bundle with Super Mario World, F-Zero, and Pilotwings. Consolation prizes of $100, $75, and $50 were awarded to second, third, and fourth-place contestants. The winner of the whole US competition won $10,000. In addition, all the winners were put into a draw to win prizes of $5,000. Along with the competition cartridge, Nintendo sent previews for new games, including Contra III: The Alien Wars, Rival Turf, The Legend of Zelda: A Link to the Past, The Addams Family, and Super Scope 6.

Similar competitions were held in Europe and Japan in 1992. The winner of the US competition, Jeff Hanson, won against the winner of the Japanese competition, Yuichi Suyama, and became the World Champion at the 1993 Consumer Electronics Show.

== See also ==
- Nintendo World Championships
- Nintendo PowerFest '94
