= Air Raid (1982 video game) =

- Developer: Men-A-Vision
- Publisher: Men-A-Vision
- Platform: Atari 2600
- Release: 1982
- Genre: Shoot 'em up
- Mode: Single-player

Air Raid is a 1982 shoot 'em up published for the Atari 2600 by Men-A-Vision, the only game released by the company. The cartridge is a blue T-handle design with a picture of flying saucers attacking a futuristic city. It had extremely limited distribution, making it highly sought after by video game collectors.

== Gameplay ==
Gameplay screenshot

The player controls a ship which scrolls side-to side directly above two buildings, with the objective of protecting the buildings from being destroyed by the bombs of enemy ships above.

== Rarity ==
On April 10, 2010, the only copy at the time known to be complete (cartridge and box) sold for $31,600. The next known copy to surface on the internet was on October 22, 2011. The eBay auction offered an incomplete version of the game (cart only). Air Raid still sold for an impressive amount of $3,575 US. The transaction was completed, having both parties exchange positive feedback making this the second highest confirmed price paid for the game. On October 24, 2012, the first truly complete game (cartridge, instruction manual and box) was listed for auction and eventually sold for $33,433.30. Due to the media attention that this complete copy brought, on October 26, 2012, a third boxed copy (although without the instruction manual) surfaced on eBay. On June 28, 2021, a Goodwill employee in Fort Worth, Texas found and auctioned off a playable copy of the game at eBay for $10,590.79, which was a success for the company to raise more than $10,000.
