= Nintendo World Championships =

Esports event

- Genre: Esports
- Location: Nationwide
- Country: United States
- Inaugurated: March 8, 1990; 36 years ago
- Most recent: October 7, 2017; 9 years ago
- Organizer: Nintendo of America
- Website: nwc.nintendo.com

The Nintendo World Championships (NWC) are a nationwide video game competition series, organized by Nintendo of America at no particular interval.

The first Nintendo World Championships were held in 1990, touring 29 American cities, being hosted in Los Angeles, CA twice. The NWC was conceived by Steve Grossman and Jay Coleman, principals at EMCI, Nintendo's marketing agency. Greggory Vasquez-Vasquez was the inaugural champion defeating 48 others and dominating the NES championship event. The event won numerous marketing awards and was sponsored by Pepsi, Reebok, and Nabisco. It was based on a custom Nintendo Entertainment System Game Pak, which would historically become one of the most rare and valuable NES cartridges. The NWC is considered one of the first ever esports events. In 2014, Nintendo released NES Remix 2, featuring the reminiscent Nintendo World Championships Remix, which uses emulation and online leaderboards for amateur global competition. On June 15, 2015, the second Nintendo World Championships took place for the event's 25th anniversary as part of Nintendo's E3 2015 coverage. The third Nintendo World Championships were held on October 7, 2017.

A video game themed around the event, titled Nintendo World Championships: NES Edition, was released for the Nintendo Switch on July 18, 2024.

== 1990 ==
Preceding the Nintendo World Championships, the Nintendo Challenge Championship (NCC) was held in Canada in 1989 and 1990, coinciding with Nintendo's 100th anniversary. This was Nintendo's first annual nationwide video game competition series. Nintendo assumed full distribution and marketing from its partners and rebranded its competitions as the Nintendo World Championships.

The Nintendo World Championships began March 8–11, 1990, in the Fair Park's Automobile Building in Dallas, Texas, and toured 29 cities across the United States. Players from three separate age groups (11 and below, 12–17, and 18 and above) competed across three days. The top two scorers then competed for the title of City Champion. The finalists won a trophy, US$250, and a trip for two to the World Finals at Universal Studios Hollywood in Los Angeles, California. The runners-up won a Power Pad and a Game Boy.

The World Finals were held December 7–9, 1990, conducted similarly to the City Championships and were located at Universal Studios Hollywood in Los Angeles, California within the Star Trek Theater (now the DreamWorks Theatre). There, contestants played a special Nintendo World Championships 1990 cartridge for the Nintendo Entertainment System.

The cartridge contains three customized minigames based upon the popular games Super Mario Bros. (1985), Rad Racer (1987), and Tetris (1989). The objective is to achieve a high score according to a custom cumulative scoring formula across all games, within a total time limit of 6 minutes and 21 seconds.

Three 1990 World Champion titles were given. Jeff Hansen won in the under-11 category, Thor Aackerlund won in the 12–17 category, and Robert Whiteman won in the 18+ category. There was no official competition round to crown a single winner. However, after the competition ended, there was an informal face-off between the three winners, with Aackerlund taking first place, Hansen taking second, and Whiteman finishing third. The top winner in each age category was awarded a $10,000 U.S. savings bond, a 1990 Geo Metro Convertible, a 40" rear-projection television, and a golden Mario trophy. Runners-up in each age category received a $1,000 U.S. savings bond and a silver Mario trophy.

Immediately after winning the NWC, Aackerlund became the official video game spokesperson for Camerica Corporation, a direct competitor to Nintendo. Hansen later became the United States representative to Japan to win the World Championships title in Tokyo, Japan, and again in Las Vegas at a rematch with the Japanese champion, Yuichi Suyama.

Nintendo sponsored similar competitions, including the Nintendo Campus Challenge in 1991 and 1992, Nintendo PowerFest '94, and revived the Nintendo World Championships in 2015.

=== Cartridge ===
The competition was based on the NES cartridge titled Nintendo World Championships 1990. It is unknown how many gray cartridges were made, and the highest numbered as of September 2020 is #353. Copies of the gray cartridge were given to the ninety finalists after the championships concluded. Another twenty-six gold copies are known to exist, similar to the gold cartridge design of The Legend of Zelda, which were given as prizes in a separate contest by Nintendo Power magazine. Both versions have an exposed bank of DIP switches to set the amount of time the player has to complete the three games, shorter and longer than the 6 minutes 21 seconds used in the actual competition.

The Nintendo World Championships 1990 Game Pak is considered to be the most valuable NES cartridge ever released, and one of the rarest. Collectors have paid six-digit prices for a single copy.

== 2015 ==
Narcissa Wright played Super Mario Maker during the final of Nintendo World Championships 2015.

On May 13, 2015, Nintendo announced the return of Nintendo World Championships for the 25th anniversary of the original event, as part of the company's E3 2015 coverage. Qualifying competitions began on May 30, 2015, in eight Best Buy locations across the United States. At each location, contestants competed for the high score in a custom mode of Ultimate NES Remix. The winners from each of these eight locations, as well as eight players invited by Nintendo (six speedrunners and two celebrity contestants), became the contestants for the live event.

The competition used an elimination tournament format with a repechage bracket named the Underground, with a wide history of Nintendo's game library. The live video of the final event was streamed online from Los Angeles on June 14, 2015; commentators included Audrey Drake of Nintendo Treehouse and competitive Pokémon VGC commentator Justin Flynn. An edited, exclusive one-hour television special aired on Disney XD later that year, featuring retrospective interviews with many contestants and a shortened overview of the competition. Notable competitors who failed to make it to the finale included Trihex, Arin Hanson, and The Mexican Runner.

The last contest consisted of custom levels within the then-unreleased Super Mario Maker for Wii U, played by the two finalists: professional Super Smash Bros. player John Numbers, the qualifying player from New York City; and professional speedrunner Narcissa Wright. In the first two levels, the players were alternately blindfolded while the other played. The player who completed the levels the fastest would receive a 5-second advantage in the final level. In the final level, they raced simultaneously to the end, where Numbers won the championship title. Gamesradar said that Numbers demonstrated "impulsive mastery" of the Super Mario Maker levels, which were "hellish", "sadistic", "evil", and "truly weird". Nintendo's Shigeru Miyamoto made a surprise appearance to present a trophy to the winner, and an autographed New Nintendo 3DS XL system to each of the two finalists.

== 2017 ==
On August 8, 2017, Nintendo of America announced the return of the Nintendo World Championships. Qualifying rounds took place from August 19 to September 10, 2017, at selected Best Buy locations across eight cities in the United States. John Numbers, the returning champion of 2015, was one of the 13-and-older qualifiers. Eight invited competitors were slated in advance to compete against the sixteen qualifiers, including Bayley and Asa Butterfield.

The main event was held at the Manhattan Center's Grand Ballroom on October 7, 2017, and was streamed via YouTube and Twitch and simulcast on Disney XD's "D|XP" block. As in 2015, it used an elimination tournament format including the returning Underground repechage bracket, showcasing select gameplay modes and levels from recent and retro games.

The overall winner was Thomas Gonda (Thomas G.), who defeated the 2015 champion John Numbers in the then-unreleased Super Mario Odyssey.

== Reception ==
In 2015, Gamesradar said the Super Mario Maker levels were "hellish", "sadistic", "evil", and "truly weird", summarizing: "The Super Mario Maker climax ended Nintendo's championships on a pitch-perfect retro note." Contestant Joshua Ovenshire of Smosh Games said that the Nintendo World Championships should be "a staple at every E3 ... I was a part of Nintendo history. That's where the magic is at."

In 2017, the Underground was noted to be generally more forgiving than it was in 2015, as multiple contestants had the opportunity to advance.

== See also ==
- Nintendo PowerFest '94
- Nintendo Campus Challenge
- Classic Tetris World Championship
