= Zee Cohen-Sanchez =

American activist and political organizer (born 1991)

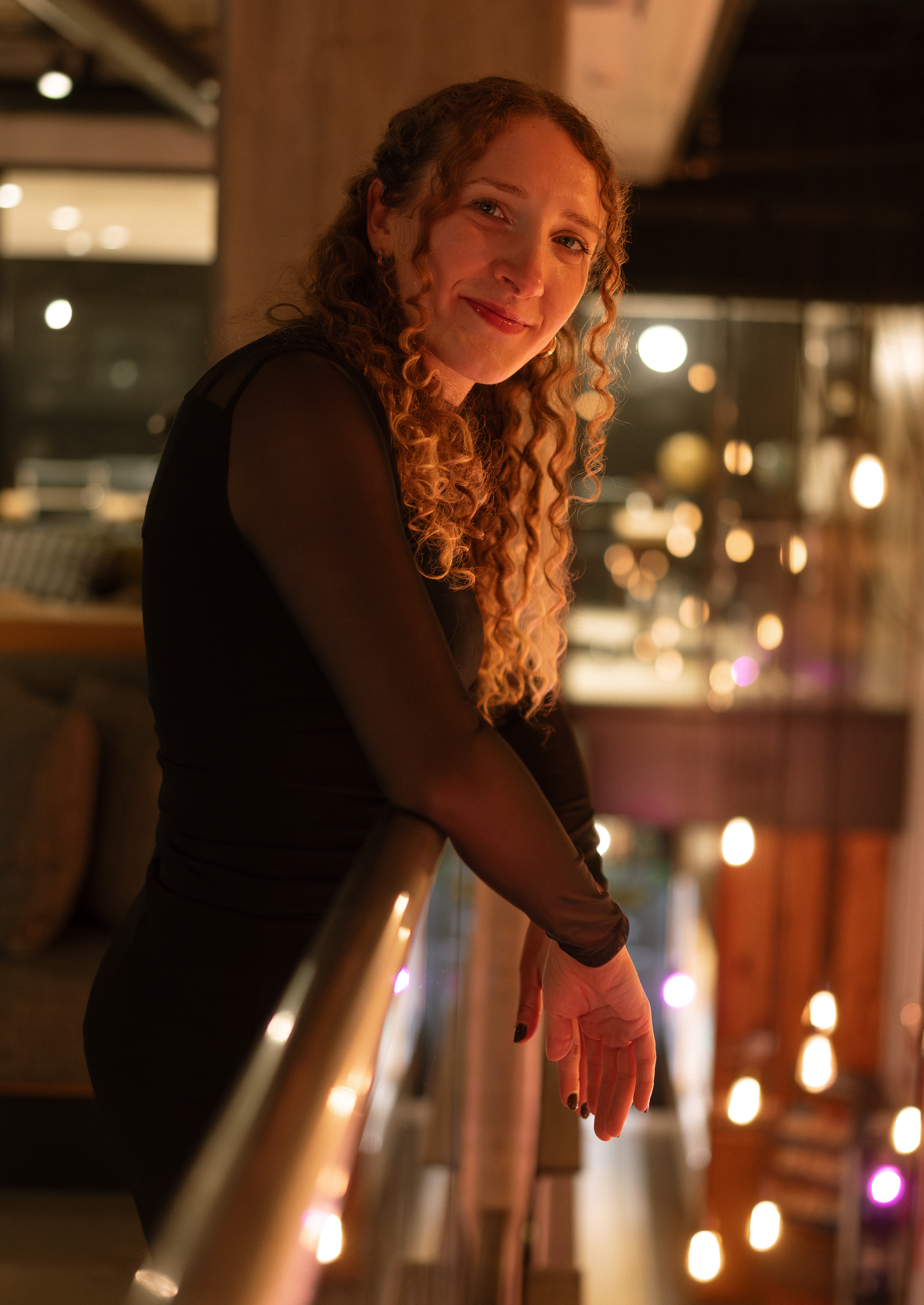
- Cohen-Sanchez at a rally in Washington D.C. in 2025
- Born: Elizabeth Cohen; 1991 (age 34–35); Los Angeles, California, U.S.
- Education: Wagner College
- Occupations: Political strategist; campaigner; activist
- Years active: c. 2016–present
- Organizations: Sole Strategies; Unfuck America Tour; National Ground Game
- Known for: Founder and CEO of Sole Strategies
- Political party: Democratic

Elizabeth "Zee" Cohen-Sanchez (née Cohen; born 1991) is an American activist and political campaigner and founder of Sole Strategies, an organization focused on leading field campaigns for “underdog candidates”.

== Early life ==
Cohen-Sanchez was born in 1991 in Los Angeles to Jewish atheist parents. She and her family moved to Australia in the aftermath of the 1992 Los Angeles riots, where she would spend the "early years" of her life.

== Career ==
Cohen-Sanchez's interest in politics began when she was an undergraduate at Wagner College after witnessing the impact of Occupy Wall Street movement which exposed pressing issues facing America. Convinced that grassroots mobilization has the potential to influence good policies that create a better America, Sanchez decided to join "forward-thinking" candidates’ political campaigns.

Cohen-Sanchez left her graduate school to join Bernie Sanders’ 2016 presidential campaign. In 2018, she joined Democrat Alexandria Ocasio-Cortez (AOC) where she played a role heading a segment of AOC’s campaign for New York's 14th congressional district.

In 2020, Cohen-Sanchez established Sole Strategies, focused on grassroots engagement and mobilization for Democratic candidates.

Cohen-Sanchez founded the Unfuck America Tour and National Ground Game in November 2024.

The Unfuck America Tour was originally conceived to follow Turning Point USA's college tour and offer progressive alternatives, specifically regarding the youth vote. After Charlie Kirk’s assassination, Cohen-Sanchez considered canceling the events but chose to proceed, stating that the tour would “provide a forum to defend free speech and condemn political violence”.
