= Unfuck America Tour =

American political campus tour

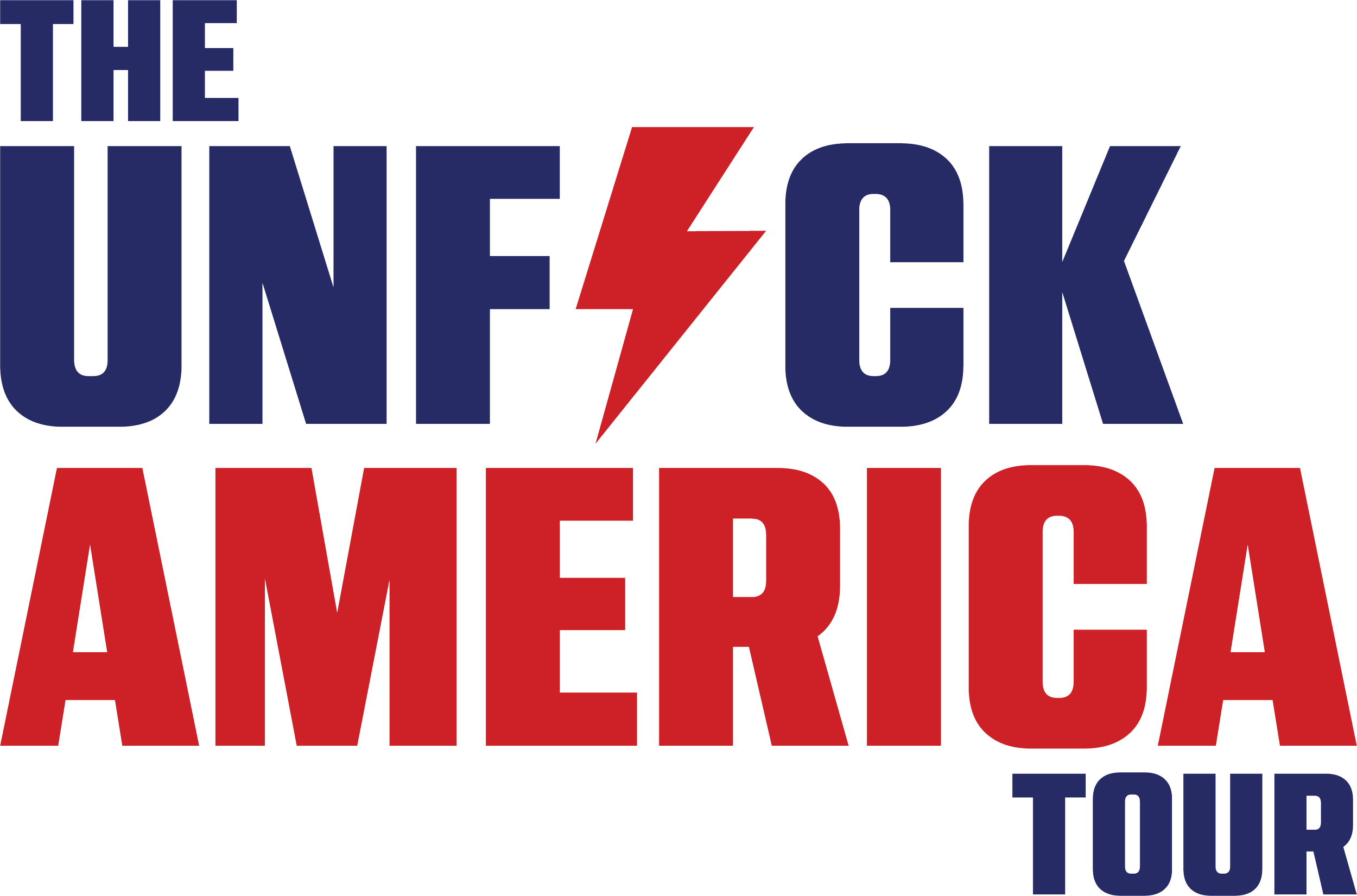
- Abbreviation: UFA
- Formation: November 19, 2024; 22 months ago
- Founder: Zee Cohen-Sanchez
- Type: Nonprofit
- Legal status: Active
- Headquarters: La Mesa, California, U.S.
- Location: United States
- Parent organization: National Ground Game PAC
- Website: unfuckamericatour.com

The Unfuck America Tour is an American progressive political campus event series associated with and headed by the National Ground Game PAC. It has received media coverage for organizing debate-style events and counter-programming appearances using social media influencers and content creators in response to Turning Point USA activities on college campuses.

== History ==
Zee Cohen-Sanchez launched the National Ground Game, the parent organization of Unfuck America, on November 19, 2024 while the tour itself began in April 2025.

According to its organizers, the tour was launched in response to the growth of conservative youth organizing, especially by Turning Point USA, after the 2024 United States elections. National Ground Game has described the project as part of an effort to build Democratic youth turnout infrastructure through campus appearances, online political content, and voter registration drives.

The group is based out of La Mesa, California.

The group has recently faced controversy for hosting a debate with January 6th insurrectionist and right-wing agitator Jake Lang. The group faced additional backlash after Zee Cohen-Sanchez posted a promotional video for the debate where she stated in the first line of the video that Senate candidate Abdul El-Sayed "platformed" Lang after he interrupted one of El-Sayed's events. Later in the video, Cohen-Sanchez praised El-Sayed's handling of the situation, but was widely criticized by leftist influencers for comparing El-Sayed's handling of Lang to the Unfuck America Tour hosting a debate with him.

== Activities ==
The tour has held events on college campuses, often timed to coincide with appearances by conservative speakers or organizations. Its events have typically featured open-microphone debates, livestreamed content, and appearances by online political creators.

In April 2025, the tour began at Texas A&M University in an event led by Dean Withers and Parker Sedgwick and included more than 20 content creators. The Battalion described the event as a liberal response to a campus appearance by Charlie Kirk.

The tour was scheduled alongside a Charlie Kirk event at Colorado State University for September 2025. Following the assassination of Kirk earlier that month, the Unfuck America Tour proceeded with debate events before and after a campus vigil rather than rescheduling its visit.

In December 2025, the Unfuck America Tour held an event in downtown Phoenix as counter-programming to Turning Point USA's AmericaFest, which featured left-wing influencers in live programming and debates. The Phoenix stop was part of the group's broader effort to build “the Turning Point of the left.”

By 2026, the organization's website listed planned or announced appearances at universities including the University of South Carolina, the University of Wisconsin–Madison, the University of Iowa, Michigan State University, Ohio State University, the University of Nebraska–Lincoln, North Carolina State University, Utah State University, and the University of Kentucky.

== See also ==
- Youth vote in the United States
