= Nintendo PowerFest '94 =

Video game competition by Nintendo

Nintendo World Championships '94 was a 1994 Nintendo-promoted video game competition held during the Nintendo Powerfest '94 tour. Most of the town competitions were held in customized trailers outside of department stores. It was based on scoring points in a special Game Pak. The three Super Nintendo Entertainment System games (Super Mario Bros.: The Lost Levels, Super Mario Kart, and Ken Griffey, Jr. Presents Major League Baseball) were played within a time limit of six minutes.

== Games ==
The tasks on the games are as follows:

1. Super Mario Bros.: The Lost Levels: Players must complete the first level as quickly as possible.
2. Super Mario Kart: Players must finish five laps of Mario Circuit 1.
3. Ken Griffey, Jr. Presents Major League Baseball: Players must play a home run derby and hit as many home runs as possible.

After the time expires, the final score is calculated like this:

Score from Super Mario Bros.: The Lost Levels + ((Coins collected in Super Mario Kart x 1,000) + (Finishing position score)+ ((Total distance in Major League Baseball x 100) + (Number of home runs x 10,000 in the regional events or 1,000,000 in the Finals)) = Grand Total

== City competitions ==
Local competitions took place over three days with the finals happening late Sunday afternoon. Eight finalists were chosen from the top eight scores achieved during the weekend.

Top Eight First round occurred in two parts because four people could play at a time. The players who had the top four scores played first followed by lower four scorers.

Top Four and Top Two The top four scores from the Top Eight round played and from that the Top Two played head-to-head for the Town Title. The winner was crowned Town Champion.

== World finals ==
The Nintendo World Championships II held their finals in San Diego, California. Town Champions were grouped into four teams:

1. Cyclones
2. Hurricanes
3. Tornados
4. Typhoons

The Tornados scored the highest in San Diego .

== Results ==
The final two players were Mike Iarossi and Brandon Veach on the Tornados team and played head to head on a specialized cartridge of Donkey Kong Country. Mike Iarossi had the higher score and was crowned the 1994 Nintendo World Champion.

First Qualifying Round Results

POS.	SCORE	I.D. #	LAST NAME	FIRST NAME	TEAM	RD #	UNIT
1	24127300	104	Veach	Brandon	Tornados	7	k
2	23093350	10	Frank	James	Tornados	1	j
3	23043450	123	Gebhardt	Timothy	Hurricanes	9	d
4	22072200	47	Bodiwala	Eric	Cyclones	3	k
5	22036100	59	El-Gazzar	Majid	Tornados	4	o
6	22025800	6	Rockwell	Chris	Typhoons	1	n
7	22024700	92	Provost	Jason	Tornados	6	h
8	21043950	17	Wyrick	Patrick	Hurricanes	2	a
9	21007350	42	Smith	Brian	Tornados	3	b
10	20991800	102	Poillion	William	Typhoons	7	g
11	20956950	26	Iarossi	Michael	Tornados	2	f
12	20947900	83	Sharp-Cole	Adam	Hurricanes	6	c
13	20940350	1	O'Dell	Ryan	Hurricanes	1	e
14	20031900	119	Chappell	William	Cyclones	8	n
15	19984550	55	Moody	Stanley	Typhoons	4	c
16	19979200	3	Tveton	Mike	Hurricanes	1	g
17	19978000	31	Murphy	Jason	Cyclones	2	o
18	19957300	58	Wietlisbach	Charles	Tornados	4	n
19	19954250	21	Gordon	Taylor	Typhoons	2	I
20	19953050	86	McClure	Brian	Typhoons	6	j
21	19951000	18	Ross	Scott	Hurricanes	2	b
22	19949200	78	Norris	Mark	Cyclones	5	b
23	19889300	22	Quon	Matthew	Typhoons	2	j
24	18958150	40	Theriault	Normand	Typhoons	3	h
25	18933400	113	Sullivan	Ryan	Typhoons	8	f
26	18923950	70	Johnson	Adrianne	Typhoons	5	n
27	18912050	108	Clark	Michael	Cyclones	7	o
28	18906750	39	Gerhardt	Andrew	Typhoons	3	g
29	18903250	53	Shearer	John	Typhoons	4	a
30	18898250	76	Waite	Michael	Tornados	5	l
31	18897450	118	Powell	Aaron	Cyclones	8	m
32	18894850	117	Towle	Steven	Tornados	8	l
33	18887050	109	Salamanca	John	Hurricanes	8	b
34	18882800	9	Whitlock	Dorion	Tornados	1	i
35	18881650	107	Brister	Marc	Cyclones	7	n
36	18866250	14	Burgess	Taylor	Cyclones	1	b
37	17925800	50	Lauderdale	Jason	Hurricanes	4	j
38	17902650	79	Heustess	Shannon	Cyclones	5	c
39	17895900	71	Petersma	Tanisha	Typhoons	5	o
40	17889850	63	Veach	Shannon	Cyclones	4	g
41	17870950	85	Ballesteros	Charles	Typhoons	6	i
42	17866800	37	Edgerton	Paul	Typhoons	3	e
43	17863250	35	Montes	Julio	Hurricanes	3	o
44	17860000	127	Bassin	John	Tornados	9	j
45	17851300	46	Veach	Justin	Cyclones	3	j
46	17850500	34	Heerhold	Jeff	Hurricanes	3	n
47	17849100	60	Kirby	Rich	Tornados	4	p
48	17847400	93	Guiterrez	Francisco	Cyclones	6	m
49	17845800	126	Greeson	Chris	Typhoons	9	g
50	17845400	84	Hochendel	David	Hurricanes	6	d
51	17829350	2	Tumpalan	Buenaventura	Hurricanes	1	f
52	17828600	128	Egan	William	Tornados	9	k
53	17813000	67	Fink	Jeffrey	Hurricanes	5	g
54	16865550	13	Pacifico	Andrew	Cyclones	1	a
55	16855150	11	Sorge	James	Tornados	1	k
56	16852150	23	Marken	Michael	Typhoons	2	k
57	16840350	45	Arensmeyer	Jeff	Cyclones	3	i
58	16838150	41	Heller	Thomas	Tornados	3	a
59	16836100	96	Torres	Adiel	Cyclones	6	p
60	16824200	61	Babbs	Justin	Cyclones	4	e
61	16823100	20	Jorgenson	Mike	Hurricanes	2	d
62	16814700	68	Hermogino	Ken	Hurricanes	5	h
63	16813000	99	Pleasant	Josh	Hurricanes	7	d
64	16812750	27	Ashley	Georgia	Tornados	2	g
65	16809500	131	Harris	Jessie	Cyclones	9	n
66	16808650	51	Jones	Nicholas	Hurricanes	4	k
67	16802650	69	Runky	Mackenzie	Typhoons	5	m
68	16799400	115	Cieslik	Amy	Tornados	8	j
69	16793500	52	Eisenschmidt	Oscar	Hurricanes	4	l
70	16789950	56	Sanchez	Ernie	Typhoons	4	d
71	16788000	105	Conway	Casey	Tornados	7	l
72	15826950	74	Lavender	Charles	Tornados	5	j
73	15819150	36	Kaczor	Adam	Hurricanes	3	p
74	15807100	73	Whitney	Michael	Tornados	5	i
75	15798300	44	Cieslik	Chris	Tornados	3	d
76	15785700	19	Gooche	Jacob	Hurricanes	2	c
77	15777050	16	Powell	Simon	Cyclones	1	d
78	15774000	5	Harris	David	Typhoons	1	m
79	15773000	28	Bruns	Richard	Tornados	2	h
80	15772850	95	Hughes	Jehoshua	Cyclones	6	o
81	15771950	111	Lanman	Joshua	Hurricanes	8	d
82	15769450	82	Hamilton	Tucker	Hurricanes	6	b
83	15767000	32	Forrester	John	Cyclones	2	p
84	15766050	110	Albin	Scott	Hurricanes	8	c
85	15765650	97	Nguyen	Anh	Hurricanes	7	b
86	15762250	65	Sciascia	Anthony	Hurricanes	5	e
87	15759650	121	Hernandez	Rene	Hurricanes	9	b
88	15743000	15	Whitehead	Mitchell	Cyclones	1	c
89	15742900	81	Powell	Leslie	Hurricanes	6	a
90	15636100	80	Barber	Justin	Cyclones	5	d
91	14811050	132	Torres	Magdiel	Cyclones	9	o
92	14780450	62	Tatum	John	Cyclones	4	f
93	14772800	43	Lopez	David	Tornados	3	c
94	14770550	4	Digiorgio	Giovanni	Hurricanes	1	h
95	14769450	72	Levin	Jeremy	Typhoons	5	p
96	14767450	116	Guinane	Mark	Tornados	8	k
97	14761600	25	Speerbrecker	Josh	Tornados	2	e
98	14760100	57	Coughi	Rick	Tornados	4	m
99	14746100	12	Cieslik	Mike	Tornados	1	l
100	14742850	129	Heatley	Bryan	Tornados	9	l
101	14736250	64	Walsh	Henry	Cyclones	4	h
102	14736200	30	Harke	John	Cyclones	2	n
103	14734300	88	Castellon	Jose	Typhoons	6	l
104	14730150	124	Dennis	Jason	Typhoons	9	e
105	14727150	91	Evans	Michael	Tornados	6	g
106	14726450	100	Pirring	Michael	Typhoons	7	e
107	14725700	54	Harrison	Sam	Typhoons	4	b
108	14723900	8	Sheets	Diane	Typhoons	1	p
109	14723600	89	Chaves	Cheston	Tornados	6	e
110	14692200	98	Remesal	Andre	Hurricanes	7	c
111	14683500	106	Bacon	Sean	Cyclones	7	m
112	13742900	77	Coker	James	Cyclones	5	a
113	13715900	33	La Forga	Juanito	Hurricanes	3	m
114	13714200	120	Levy	Jon	Cyclones	8	o
115	13713900	103	Wojdowski	Neal	Tornados	7	j
116	13701300	29	Orozco	Mauricio	Cyclones	2	m
117	13684050	90	Clark	Eddierick	Tornados	6	f
118	13683900	122	Vera	Matthew	Hurricanes	9	c
119	13660350	38	Connally	Dan	Typhoons	3	f
120	13592200	125	Cid	Vidal	Typhoons	9	f
121	12664500	114	Massey	Zachery	Typhoons	8	g
122	12661150	75	Lim	Daniel	Tornados	5	k
123	12656800	94	Padilla	John	Cyclones	6	n
124	12654950	101	Spicer	Roger	Typhoons	7	f
125	12635300	130	Eckles	Charles	Cyclones	9	m
126	11625050	87	Rowe	Scott	Typhoons	6	k
127	11572300	49	Perry	Brandon	Hurricanes	4	i
128	11510550	66	Wetzbarger	Taylor	Hurricanes	5	f
129	10550700	112	King	Michael	Typhoons	8	e
130	10539150	24	Tarango	Hercules	Typhoons	2	l
131	10537500	48	Jones	James	Cyclones	3	l
132	9525950	7	Petersma	Trevor	Typhoons	1	o

== Cartridge ==
Nintendo PowerFest '94 cartridge connected to SNES

Nintendo produced around 33 cartridges for the PowerFest '94. These were used in stores across the country in 1994 for around 130 different events. The winners of each event won a trip to San Diego, CA to play in the World Championships. The second-place winner at each event got a Star Fox Jacket, which had been left over from the Star Fox Competition the year before.

Out of the 33 cartridges, only two exist today. The rest were returned to Nintendo where they were reused for parts. The remaining cartridge was supposedly put up for auction on myebid with a buy it now price of $300,000; there were no bidders.

A second cartridge was uncovered and a collector, J. J. Hendricks, purchased it for $12,000.

== See also ==
- Nintendo World Championships
- Nintendo Campus Challenge
