= Trihex =

American professional esports player

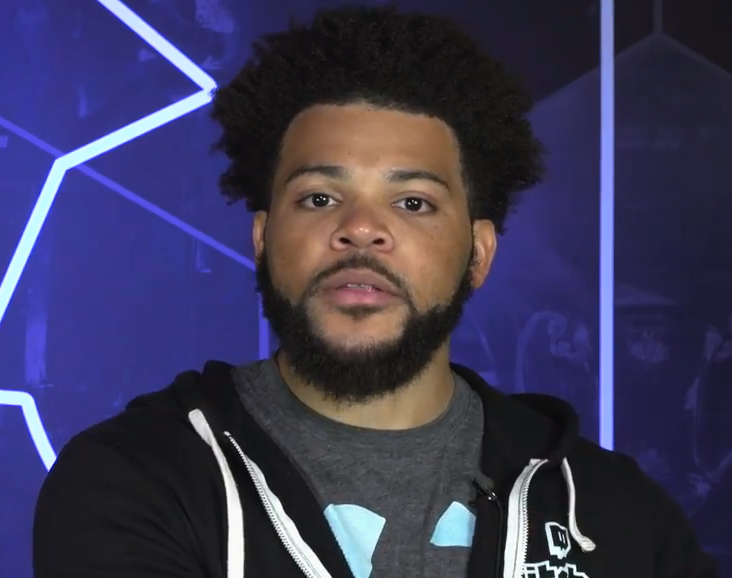
- Trihex in 2018
- Born: Mychal Ramon Jefferson
- Occupations: Twitch streamer; YouTuber
- Organization: Tempo Storm

Twitch information
- Channel: trihex
- Years active: 2011–present
- Genre: Gaming
- Games: Yoshi's Island; Super Mario Maker; Super Mario Maker 2; Jet Set Radio; Yoshi's Crafted World
- Followers: 432 thousand

YouTube information
- Channel: Trihex
- Years active: 2006–present
- Subscribers: 106 thousand
- Views: 19.6 million
- Last updated: May 2, 2023

Mychal Ramon Jefferson, better known as Trihex, is an American professional gamer, speedrunner, and Twitch streamer. He is best known for his runs of Super Mario and Yoshi games—including several notable appearances at Games Done Quick events—and as the face of TriHard, one of Twitch's most popular emotes.

== Career ==
=== Speedrunning and esports ===
Mychal Jefferson began speedrunning Super Mario World 2: Yoshi's Island (1995) in 2004, after being introduced to the concept by a Speed Demos Archive DVD that was bundled with an issue of Electronic Gaming Monthly.

His breakout run came at the Awesome Games Done Quick 2014 speedrunning charity event, where Jefferson performed a 100% run of Yoshi's Island, a game considered especially demanding. After an hour and twelve minutes, the audience of 90,000 Twitch viewers had to watch the building be evacuated when the run was interrupted by a fire alarm. The following year, Jefferson was one of eight people invited to compete in a tournament of different games at the Nintendo World Championships, where he placed third. Later that summer, Jefferson kicked off the 2015 Summer Games Done Quick with a self-narrated run of Yoshi's Island, which Polygon writer Charlie Hall praised as a "great introduction to the showmanship and the rich community that supports the biannual Games Done Quick marathons."

American esports team Tempo Storm welcomed Trihex as their newest member on November 23, 2016.

=== Twitch ===
Jefferson was among the first wave of speedrunners to live-stream their attempts in addition to publishing videos of successful runs. He learned about live-streaming from speedrunner Narcissa Wright. His first stream was aired in February 2011. He moved to Twitch when it launched later that year and continued streaming gameplay of the Super Mario series, including Super Mario Odyssey when it was released in 2017. His 2019 streams of Super Mario Maker 2 (2019) were especially popular; Jefferson accepted requests from his fans to play their levels, and often played levels designed specifically for him to play on-stream.

After comedian Jon Stewart left Comedy Central's political satire program, The Daily Show, in 2015, Jefferson lamented the state of United States political discourse, and soon began using his platform to discuss politics. At the time, discussing politics on Twitch was seen as difficult for streamers because of audience backlash, but Jefferson called airing his opinions "a moral obligation that made me feel good about doing the right thing." As Twitch became friendlier to political content, Jefferson supported the platform's evolution "from gameplay to more of a reactionary manner of content", attributing the change to the idea that "hearing someone who is relatable (streamers) provide insight into all this is a welcoming lure that is dominating the meta." Jefferson supported the presidential campaigns of Bernie Sanders in the 2016 and 2020 Democratic primaries.

Jefferson was temporarily banned from Twitch in October 2018 when he called a friend in the room a "faggot" during a Super Mario Party (2018) stream. He quickly apologized on Twitter and committed to ending usage of the word himself and in his community. He further responded to a comment request from Kotaku, adding "I regret it and definitely don't think it was justified to say." Jefferson was later banned from Awesome Games Done Quick 2020 for the comment.

Jefferson was one of a slew of political streamers who were temporarily banned for streaming the Democratic Party presidential debate on February 25, 2020. Jefferson contested that he wasn't using any audio or video from the event, showing only subtitles, and made a statement to The Verge that "I refuse to be silenced." When it was discovered that the claims were made by a fake organization allegedly on behalf of CBS, Twitch reinstated the accounts with no penalty and apologized for the incident.

In November 2018, Jefferson premiered the DT Podcast, a political collaboration with fellow streamer Destiny (Steven Bonnell). The podcast streamed its final episode in October 2019, in which Jefferson confronted Bonnell regarding public statements the latter had made defending his use of racial slurs in private.

== TriHard controversy ==
Jefferson's face is one of the most widely recognized on Twitch; it appears as TriHard, a popular emote usable by anyone who uses the site. The emote's origins lie in a photograph of Jefferson posing with a woman at a Dallas anime convention in the summer of 2012. Jefferson was later amused by his expression, and posted the image to his Twitter. As he recalls, "it went viral in my own chat, and I was happy with it. I agree, that was a very cringe smile I made. That girl was cute and I was freaking out and lost all of my spaghetti, and it's forever documented in that face being super-awkward."

When Twitch surveyed its users for global emote suggestions, fans begged for Jefferson's nervous smile to be made site-wide. When a Twitch employee joined his chat, Jefferson quickly attempted to show off some difficult gameplay to get their attention, and the employee dubbed the emote "TriHard".

Beginning in 2016, the emote has been used as a racist symbol, with users spamming the image in the presence of apes or African-American people on-stream, or alongside racist messages directed at black streamers. Since Jefferson's face had emerged as a "de facto slur" on Twitch, some streamers have banned TriHard from their chat. Jefferson has spoken out against calls for a site-wide ban on the emote, arguing that "it's not the emote's fault that it's being used for racist things," and pointing to its positive use in different contexts. He also places the responsibility for ending its misuse on streamers and their chat moderators, rather than on chatters. Jefferson later mocked Twitch's handling of a similar controversy surrounding a KFC promotional emote.

TriHard is currently one of the most used emotes on Twitch.
