= IndieLand =

Video game charity livestream

- Genre: Video games and charity
- Locations: Los Angeles, CA (live event)
- Country: United States
- Inaugurated: 2018; 8 years ago
- Founders: Jirard Khalil, Michael Barryte, Alex Faciane, Fraizer Perez-Yadon
- Most recent: October 27, 2023; 3 years ago
- Organizer: Open Hand Foundation
- Website: indieland.org

IndieLand is a live streaming charity event centered around showcasing indie games. Co-founded by YouTube personality Jirard Khalil – known as The Completionist – in 2018, the event is a fundraiser under the Open Hand Foundation charity, aimed at raising funds for dementia research. The event features game developers alongside gaming personalities and celebrities.

Following the 2023 iteration, the event was discovered to have not donated any of the money raised since its inception, despite claims from Khalil that the event's funds would go towards various dementia research charities. Khalil responded to the situation by admitting that the funds were not donated towards the charities, and claimed that IndieLand would remove the charity aspect.

== History ==
=== Origins, events and format (2018–2022) ===
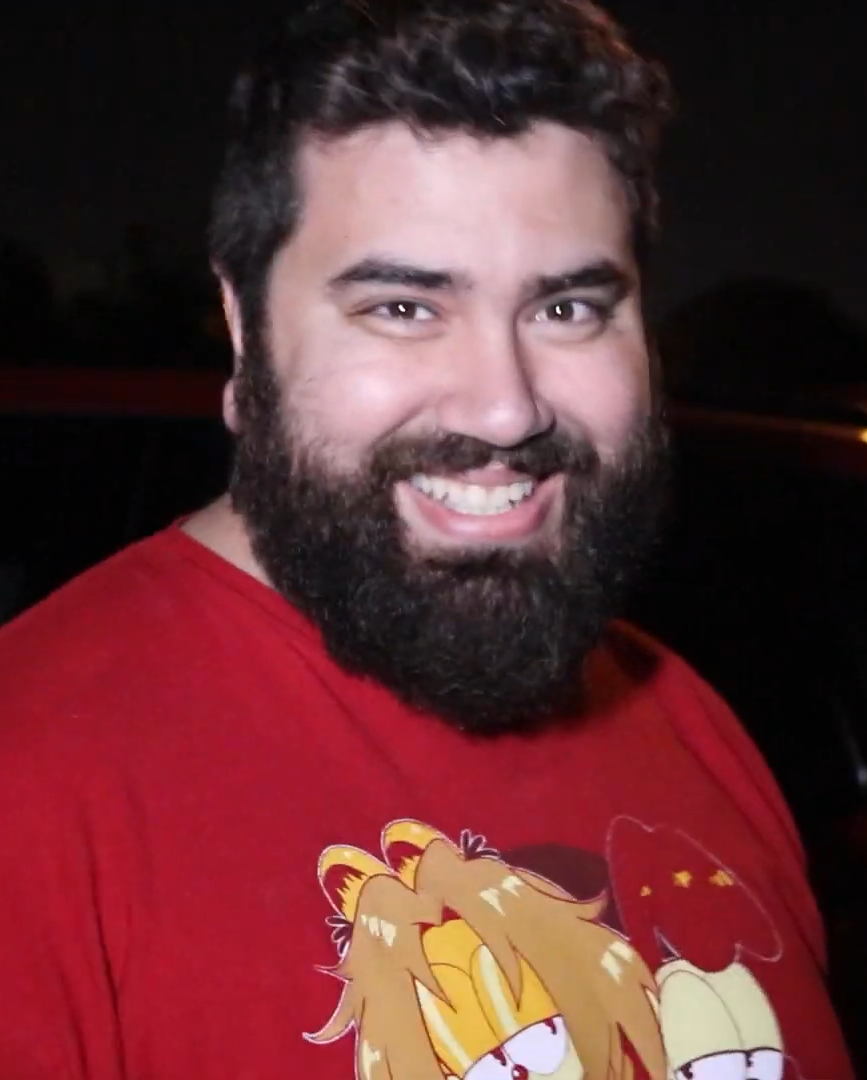
Khalil in 2019

YouTuber Jirard Khalil, known as The Completionist, co-founded IndieLand in 2018 as a fundraiser for the Open Hand Foundation, a dementia research charity founded in 2003 by Khalil's family in honor of Khalil's mother. According to a Dexerto interview, Khalil credited members of his company "ThatOneVideoGamer" with the idea. Creative directors Michael Barryte and Alex Faciane, and general manager Frazier Perez-Yadon took inspiration from the Scare to Care charity event, hosted by Polaris (Maker Studios). Learning of the Open Hand Foundation, Barryte proposed the idea to Khalil, who had also desired to participate more in charity work and was passionate about indie games. The name originated from their goal of having separate blocks for specific game genres, based on hub areas in theme parks; the "micro lands" idea was soon discarded due to issues with scheduling developers in similar time frames. The events were live streamed on Khalil's Twitch channel.

IndieLand showcases various indie games with various developers, alongside guest appearances from gaming personalities and celebrities. According to Khalil, guests and talent became easier for the group to secure as IndieLand became more focused. However, several developers were often denied due to scheduling shifts. The team also found difficulty in garnering partners and sponsors, claiming that the process for each event involved repeatedly explaining the IndieLand event. The first event was hosted in 2018 and featured Yacht Club Games and WayForward. The 2019 event provided a donation incentive for IndieLand to be hosted live, and contained the first trailer for GalaxyTrail's Freedom Planet 2. The 2021 iteration featured a revamped trailer of Freedom Planet 2 with additional gameplay from Khalil. 2021 also saw publisher Freedom Games show several games including Dark Deity. Other games shown at the event include Aeterna Noctis, Cursed to Golf, Demon Turf and Revita in 2021, and River City Girls 2 and Sea of Stars in the 2022 iteration. Celebrities and personalities who appeared in IndieLand include Jamie Lee Curtis, Arin Hanson, Grant Kirkhope, and Brennan Lee Mulligan.

IndieLand was described among publications as a fundraiser for dementia research. The 2020 iteration, which saw the live stream become a weekend event, raised $80,000-$100,000. Taking place on September 24-26, IndieLand 2021 raised over $100,000, with Freedom Games helping to raise over $75,000. 2022 marked the fundraiser's first live event, held at The Bourbon Room in Los Angeles on November 11-13; the event raised over $81,021 with G Fuel donating over $5,000. Throughout the streams, Khalil had stated that the donations would go to various organizations, and claimed the event was in partnership with the Alzheimer's Association and University of California, San Francisco. A mini IndieLand was also hosted in April 2020 for Direct Relief.

=== Donation controversy (2023–2025) ===
IndieLand 2023 took place on October 27-29 as an all-digital event; as of 2026, this is the most recent iteration. Following the event, YouTubers Karl Jobst and Mutahar "SomeOrdinaryGamers" Anas uploaded videos on November 13, which revealed that the Open Hand Foundation had not donated any of the money accumulated since its inception, which totaled $655,520. This included money accumulated from the IndieLand streams. When inquired about the situation in an interview with Anas and Jobst, Khalil claimed that he did not discover the funds were not donated until 2022, and that he was unhappy with the progress of the situation. However, the videos contained multiple statements where Khalil had repeatedly stated in IndieLand streams that donations would go to various charitable organizations. A clip of the 2021 event showed Khalil stating that money raised by "bits, subs, donations" would go to charities, and he stated in 2022 that they "are soon going to be partnered up with the Alzheimer's Association." Khalil made a similar statement about the Open Hand Foundation contributing to various charities in IndieLand 2023, one year after he claimed he found out. He also stated in the interview that the 2023 stream would be the last IndieLand event he would host.

The discovery led to controversy online, with many internet users blaming or defending Khalil for his role in the issue. Khalil uploaded his initial response to the situation on December 9, 2023. He acknowledged the statements he made throughout the IndieLand streams, and admitted that they had only either communicated with or considered the charities. Asserting that no criminal or financial fraud had occurred, Khalil expressed his disappointment for making "statements potentially implying donations were made when they had not yet been." He also claimed IndieLand would remove the charity component from the event should it continue, and announced his resignation as a board member of the Open Hand Foundation. Following the allegations, Khalil was removed as a non-player character from the 2023 indie game Sea of Stars, developed by Sabotage Studio. The game was previously featured on several IndieLand events from 2020 to 2023, along with Sabotage Studio's game The Messenger. Khalil had also interviewed the CEO of Sabotage Studio, Thierry Boulanger, throughout the streams, and had supported Sea of Stars on Kickstarter.

Khalil uploaded a second response on September 25, 2025. He claimed the California Department of Justice opened an investigation into the Open Hand Foundation following Anas and Jobst's videos, and stated he would share the investigation's final results when they are released. He also divulged his disagreements with his family regarding Open Hand's finances, and apologized for making misleading statements and not partnering directly with charities.

== See also ==
- Charity fraud
