= Sea of Stars =

2023 role-playing video game

- Cover art featuring the two protagonists Valere and Zale
- Developer: Sabotage Studio
- Publisher: Sabotage Studio
- Director: Thierry Boulanger
- Designers: Thierry Boulanger; Phillipe Dionne
- Programmer: Sylvain Cloutier
- Artists: Michael Lavoie; Bryce Kho
- Writer: Thierry Boulanger
- Composers: Eric W. Brown; Yasunori Mitsuda
- Platforms: Nintendo Switch; PlayStation 4; PlayStation 5; Windows; Xbox One; Xbox Series X/S; Android; iOS; Nintendo Switch 2
- Release: Nintendo Switch, PlayStation 4, PlayStation 5, Windows, Xbox One, Xbox Series X/S; August 29, 2023; Android, iOS; April 7, 2026; Nintendo Switch 2; June 8, 2026
- Genre: Role-playing
- Modes: Single-player, multiplayer

Sea of Stars is a 2023 role-playing video game developed and published by Sabotage Studio. It is set primarily on an archipelago of islands in a fantasy world, where the player controls either Valere or Zale, Solstice Warriors who use the power of the sun and moon. They journey throughout the world on a quest to destroy powerful monsters called Dwellers, and to stop the immortal alchemist who created them. The game is presented in a fixed isometric view using two-dimensional pixel art, similar to Super Nintendo Entertainment System-era RPGs such as Chrono Trigger (1995).

Sabotage Studio began work on the game in 2018 after the release of their first game, The Messenger. Creative director Thierry Boulanger's vision for Sea of Stars was to combine what he saw as the best parts of several older role-playing games, with an emphasis on modernizing and translating the feeling of playing them rather than directly copying them. This included the integration of the game's art and map design via seamless traversal of the terrain, strategic and real-time elements in combat, and variety and depth of the art and music. The studio wanted to self-publish, and launched a Kickstarter campaign in March 2020 alongside a press reveal to prove the viability of the project to themselves and investors.

Sea of Stars was released for Nintendo Switch, PlayStation 4, PlayStation 5, Windows, Xbox One, and Xbox Series X/S in August 2023. It received positive reviews, with acclaim for its graphics and music. Critics had mixed opinions towards the story and characterization, and some said that the combat lacked depth. Sea of Stars sold over 250,000 copies in its first week, and was played by more than six million people by November 2024. The game received several accolades, including winning Best Independent Game at the Golden Joystick Awards and The Game Awards 2023, and nominations for Game of the Year at the Golden Joystick Awards and the Game Developers Choice Awards. A downloadable content expansion called "Throes of the Watchmaker" was released in May 2025.

== Gameplay ==
A battle between Valere, Zale, and Garl and an enemy. Garl is attacking, while Valere has yet to take her turn. The enemy is charging an attack with one turn remaining. It has four locks on the attack; three are hidden, while a sword hit lock has been broken, reducing the damage to 88%.

Sea of Stars is a role-playing video game (RPG) set primarily on a set of islands in a fantasy world, in which the player-character and their allies navigate the terrain and fight off hostile creatures. The game world is divided between an overworld map, depicting the landscape from a scaled-down view, and navigable areas such as forests and towns that are depicted as more realistically-scaled. Both of these are presented in a fixed isometric view using two-dimensional pixel art, similar to Super Nintendo Entertainment System-era RPGs such as Chrono Trigger (1995). In the navigable areas, the player can converse with locals to procure items and services, solve puzzles and challenges, or encounter enemies.

The player navigates the game world by controlling either Valere and Zale, the Solstice Warriors, which they select at the outset of the game. The other members of the active party, up to two characters, follow them. In co-op mode, each player controls one of the three characters. The characters can freely run, swim, and climb the terrain as if it were a fully three-dimensional world. Enemies, typically monsters, are located in specific locations throughout the game world, and will attack upon being approached, with battles taking place in fixed positions at those locations.

Battles are turn-based, with no time limit on turns. On each of the player's turns, they can have one of the active party members take an action: attacking, using a unique ability, using an item, or using a special charged ability. Once a character has taken an action, they cannot take another one until all active party members have done so. Enemies have countdown timers for the number of player turns until they can take an action; multiple enemies can take an action on the same turn if their timers run out simultaneously.

Characters also have mana points, which are used for their unique abilities; these abilities might damage enemies with elemental effects, heal characters, or revive unconscious characters. Often, enemies will charge up an attack for multiple rounds, which can be stopped or mitigated by attacking with the element types that break their "locks"; these lock types may be hidden or require multiple characters to break. Different characters have different elemental affinities, such as Moon for Valere or Sun for Zale. Attacking enemies can release "live mana", which can be absorbed by characters to grant elemental damage to otherwise physical attacks.

The player can have up to six party members; if they have more than three they can swap out reserve characters and active characters who are available to take action at any time without penalty. Special charged abilities charge up over the course of a battle as enemies take damage, and often involve multiple characters working in concert. If the player correctly times button presses just as a character attacks an enemy or vice versa, they can cause the character to do more damage or reduce the amount of damage taken. Defeating enemies earns experience points, which at set amounts increases the level of all characters, increasing their damage, defense, and health.

Outside of battles, the player can interact with non-playable characters, who can have short conversations, sell armor, weapons, and items, and give quests. The player can also fish at specific locations, pick ingredients, rest and cook those ingredients at campfires to create food items, and save their game at books throughout the world. Puzzles are required to be solved throughout the game, usually by moving blocks, flipping switches, and using Zane and Valere's Eclipse magic to adjust the time of day. Multiple modes of transportation become available on the world map throughout the game, such as boats or being hurled between islands.

== Plot ==
Valere and Zale are Solstice Warriors, individuals who have control over Eclipse Magic. Their power is the only magic able to harm the Dwellers, otherworldly monsters created by a god-like alchemist called the Fleshmancer. On their journey to defeat the last known Dweller, the Dweller of Woe, they are assisted by their childhood friend, a warrior-cook named Garl, and then an assassin named Seraï. The four track down and defeat the Dweller alongside the other Solstice Warriors—Erlina, Brugaves, and Headmaster Moraine—after which the former two betray the group and summon a cult serving the Fleshmancer. The acolytes use the monster's remains to revive the powerful Dweller of Strife.

Determined to defeat the Dweller, the party travels to Mesa Island. (Note: Mesa Island is the setting of the video game The Messenger.) They discover the home of an alchemist named Resh'an, who is later revealed to be the Fleshmancer's rival and former associate. Together, they created the elixir of life, which granted them immortality. Over time, the Fleshmancer became cynical and misanthropic, leading him to create the Dwellers to spread chaos. In response, Resh'an began training the first Solstice Warriors, sparking a conflict between the alchemists spanning countless parallel universes. The conflict continues in each universe until the Dwellers grow into apocalyptic beings called World Eaters, or the Solstice Warriors gain enough power to become guardian gods.

Resh'an agrees to fight by their side, but warns that he cannot engage the Fleshmancer's creations directly, leaving Valere, Zale, Garl, and Seraï to confront the Dweller without him. On the verge of losing, Seraï attacks the Dweller with Resh'an's hourglass in desperation, and its power attracts the attention of the Fleshmancer. The alchemist dismisses the Dweller, acolytes, and Brugaves to his lair, appoints Erlina as his lieutenant, and mortally wounds Garl before leaving. Resh'an uses his power to temporarily extend Garl's lifespan, and the warrior-cook spends his remaining time helping the party secure passage through the Sea of Stars before dying. The party travels through the Sea of Stars to cross between worlds in pursuit of the Fleshmancer.

They arrive at a technologically advanced planet, which Seraï reveals is her home; she had traveled between worlds to recruit Solstice Warriors who could liberate her people from the Fleshmancer. The party fights through the planet alongside B'st, an ancient spirit given a new body by Resh'an, and they confront the Fleshmancer at his lair. The Fleshmancer summons Erlina, now transformed into a demonic being named Elysan'darëlle, and orders her to attack. The party defeats her, and Resh'an convinces the Fleshmancer into accepting defeat. Learning that a World Eater is approaching, Valere and Zale gain enough power to become guardian gods, and they leave their friends to protect the universe.

If the player completes specific sidequests, an alternative ending is unlocked. The party locates a device built by Resh'an, which they use to prevent Garl's death by traveling to the past. They replace him with B'st, who assumes Garl's form throughout his final moments to prevent a time paradox. During the confrontation with the Fleshmancer, Garl provokes him into battling the party, and they force him to retreat. Elysan'darëlle appears in another world, reunited with a transformed Brugaves. (Note: The transformed Brugaves is also the demon Barma'thazël, an antagonist in the video game The Messenger.) Valere and Zale ascend into guardian gods, and return once a year to meet Garl on his birthday.

== Development ==
Sea of Stars was created by the Quebec City-based indie developer Sabotage Studio. The company was founded in April 2016 to create The Messenger, a side-scrolling platformer. Creative director Thierry Boulanger was interested in creating an RPG, but felt that it would be too complex for a studio's first game. Instead, the team used the idea as motivation, and decided that if The Messenger was successful enough, they would make an RPG as their second game. After the game won several awards and sold well, the team began development on Sea of Stars immediately following The Messenger's release in 2018. During the course of production, the studio grew from seven developers to twenty-five.

Boulanger's concept for the game was to combine what he saw as the best parts of several older RPGs, such as the way Chrono Trigger integrated battles into the game world and gave narrative purpose to the differences between regions, how Super Mario RPG (1996) used timed inputs to make combat interactive, and how Illusion of Gaia (1993) gave a sense of the game world having a history. The team wanted the game to evoke the memory of those older games via its aesthetic, such as a 2D pixel art style, but to modernize the gameplay and design rather than directly copy elements. One of Boulanger's goals was to integrate the game's art and map design by having seamless traversal of the terrain, with characters able to freely move around the terrain and climb vertical elements rather than having grid-based movement or a division between the game area and artistic elements. Similarly, composer Eric W. Brown created different ambient sounds for all of the areas to evoke a sense of place and connect the audio experience with the gameplay.

Each area of the game was intended to be distinct so that the player would be constantly discovering something new and not get tired of an area or not want to replay it. Similarly, the team tried not to overly reuse enemy and art designs to avoid a sense of repetition. The difficulty was balanced so that the player would not be discouraged from skipping battles or moving to the next area, and would not be incentivized to spend time grinding in one place. Additionally, the overall world was designed to give them the sense that it had a history that went beyond the game's immediate story. Elements were also added to hint that the game was a distant prequel to The Messenger; the combined game universe was one that Boulanger had been developing since childhood. As sun and moon-based magic was a large part of the story, Sabotage felt that it was important to have lighting effects integrated into the game, and so spent the first six months of development creating dynamic lighting capabilities that appeared visually consistent with the pixel art.

The game's combat was designed to emphasize tactics while removing the restrictions of the game's inspirations. The active elements were to allow player skill to play a part in battles, while leaving the overall battle turn-based without a timer meant that the player was encouraged to think about their tactics rather than react quickly. The tactical options were expanded by allowing them to change the order of character actions, as well as swap out characters at will without penalty.

While The Messenger was published by Devolver Digital, for Sea of Stars Sabotage wanted to handle the majority of the publishing and marketing itself. It started discussing the project outside of the development team in September 2019, and in order to prove the viability of the project to themselves and investors, the team planned to launch a Kickstarter campaign in March 2020 alongside a reveal to the press at the 2020 Game Developers Conference. The conference was changed to a virtual event less than two weeks beforehand due to the COVID-19 pandemic, but Sabotage decided not to postpone the reveal. In the middle of the campaign, Yasunori Mitsuda, composer for Chrono Trigger, agreed to compose several tracks for the game, which producer Phillip Barclay said gave a boost to the campaign. It concluded with over 25,000 backers and CA$1,600,000 in pledges. The following February, Sabotage received funding from video gaming investment fund Kowloon Nights, which it said was required to avoid cutting any content from the design while still self-publishing.

The majority of the game's music was composed by Eric W. Brown, who had previously composed the music for The Messenger and who composes and performs chiptune music. Brown was primarily inspired by Chrono Trigger, which was the first game he played where he felt the music was connected to the game design. He based the sounds in Sea of Stars's music on the specific sounds used in Chrono Trigger before allowing them to expand beyond the physical limitations of the Super Nintendo Entertainment System, and describes the end result as from an "SNES plus plus". He gave each island in the game a signature instrument to create a distinct atmosphere, such as pan flutes or chimes. In addition to Brown, Mitsuda contributed twelve tracks, the top of the range Sabotage had asked for, including battle, boss, and town tracks, as well as Seraï's theme. The music was released as a three-disc digital album, Sea of Stars Original Game Soundtrack, as well as a 2-disc vinyl LP record.

Sea of Stars was released for Nintendo Switch, PlayStation 4, PlayStation 5, Windows, Xbox One, and Xbox Series X/S on August 29, 2023. It was the first game to release simultaneously on Xbox Game Pass and PlayStation Plus. A physical edition was released on May 10, 2024, for Nintendo Switch, PlayStation 4, PlayStation 5, and Xbox Series X/S. An artbook, Sea of Stars: The Concept Art of Bryce Kho, was released in May 2024 by 3dtotal. A free update to the game, "Dawn of Equinox", was released on November 12, 2024, adding co-op for up to three players, changes to combat mechanics, and a revised prologue. A downloadable expansion, "Throes of the Watchmaker", was released on May 20, 2025, adding a new area and unique game mechanics. A version for Nintendo Switch 2 was released on June 8, 2026, alongside a final update titled "Sunset Edition".

=== IndieLand and NPC removal ===
Internet personality Jirard Khalil, known as The Completionist, promoted Sea of Stars from 2020 through 2023 through IndieLand, an annual live stream event showcasing indie games that was focused on fundraising for the Open Hand Foundation charity for dementia research. Khalil also interviewed Boulanger in the streams, and supported the game through Kickstarter. Sabotage created IndieLand-specific content, and included Khalil as a non-playable character in the game under the name "Jirard the Constructionist". In December 2023, Khalil's character was removed from the game following allegations of charity fraud against the Open Hand Foundation for withholding money accumulated since 2014.

== Reception ==
Reception

Aggregate scores
Aggregator	Score
Metacritic	(PC) 87/100 (NS) 90/100 (PS5) 87/100 (XSXS) 89/100
OpenCritic	97%

Review scores
Publication	Score
Eurogamer	4/5
Famitsu	33/40
Game Informer	9/10
GameSpot	9/10
GamesRadar+	4.5/5
IGN	8/10
Jeuxvideo.com	17/20
PC Gamer (US)	79/100

Sea of Stars received "generally favorable" reviews for the PC, Xbox Series X/S and PlayStation 5 versions and "universal acclaim" for the Nintendo Switch version, according to the review aggregator Metacritic. It was ranked as one of the top 20 games of 2023 by aggregated score for Windows and PlayStation 5, and the sixth-highest scored Switch game and ninth-highest scored Xbox Series X/S game. In Japan, four critics from Famitsu gave the game a total score of 33 out of 40. Sea of Stars sold 100,000 copies in 24 hours and over 250,000 in its first week. The game had been played by more than five million people by March 2024, and six million by November 2024.

Critics praised the gameplay, though the depth of the mechanics had a mixed reception. Several reviewers described the combat as challenging but satisfying; Kaan Serin of Eurogamer said it was one of the "most engaging turn-based battle systems" they had played in a while, Josh Broadwell of Polygon said it was "one of the smarter combat systems in the genre", and Kyle Hilliard of Game Informer said it was fantastic. Jon Bailes of GamesRadar+, however, said that the lack of status effects made battles a bit straightforward and Gabriel Moss of IGN criticized the lack of depth in the combat system, while Charles-Antoine of JV found battles to be repetitive. GamesRadar+ also criticized a lack of depth across all of "the mechanical parts" of the game, including the puzzles and side activities, though IGN said they were simple but required "a decent amount of thought". IGN and JV both also praised the level design of the traverseable areas.

Sea of Stars's plot received mixed opinions from reviewers. IGN called it "an approachable and endearing story", JV praised the pacing and the writing of the characters, and Game Informer said it did a good job showing multiple aspects of the story. The GamesRadar+ review found the plot to be shallow in the first half, but more interesting in the second, while the GameSpot review said the story was enjoyable but predictable and Kerry Brunskill of PC Gamer said it was shallow and predictable but held together by the game's sincerity and charm. Eurogamer, however, said that the characters were shallow and that Zale and Valere's emotions unexplored, and Polygon said that the characters had "one-note personalities" that did not change or grow, that Zale and Valere were "interchangeable", that conflicts were simply dropped rather than resolving, and that the plot as a whole was "telegraphed so clearly" that nothing was ever surprising.

The graphics, aesthetics, and music were universally praised. Game Informer, GameSpot, and GamesRadar+ all praised the pixel art, with the GameSpot reviewer terming it "some of the most gorgeous pixel art I've ever seen". JV praised the artistic direction as well as the use of light. Polygon and Eurogamer said it was beautiful, with Polygon adding that it was "brimming with magic", while Eurogamer said it was like a "dream SNES game". The GamesRadar+ and IGN reviews praised the "catchy" music, both Brown's and Mitsuda's, and IGN and Game Informer liked the way each area or theme had its own unique music. JV said that the game was as much an auditory experience as it was a visual one. Eurogamer concluded that the game was devoted to taking care and effort even on small details, and that "when something is made with love, that love surfaces in the smallest flourishes."

=== Accolades ===
Sea of Stars won Best Indie Game and was nominated for Game of the Year at the 2023 Golden Joystick Awards, and won Best Independent Game and was nominated for Best Role Playing Game at The Game Awards 2023. It was an honorable mention for Game of the Year, Best Design, and Best Visual Art at the 2024 Game Developers Choice Awards, and won the award for "Game, Original Role Playing" and was nominated for "Gameplay Design, New IP" at the 2023 NAVGTR Awards.

Awards and nominations
Award	Category	Result	Ref.
Golden Joystick Awards	Ultimate Game of the Year	Nominated	
Golden Joystick Awards	Best Indie Game	Won	
The Game Awards 2023	Best Independent Game	Won	
The Game Awards 2023	Best Role Playing Game	Nominated	
2023 NAVGTR Awards	Game, Original Role Playing	Won	
2023 NAVGTR Awards	Gameplay Design, New IP	Nominated	
2024 Game Developers Choice Awards	Game of the Year	Honorable mention	
2024 Game Developers Choice Awards	Best Design	Honorable mention	
2024 Game Developers Choice Awards	Best Visual Art	Honorable mention	
13th New York Game Awards	Off Broadway Award for Best Indie Game	Nominated	
