= Aeterna =

Aeterna may refer to:

- Aeterna (TV series), a 2022 Russian TV series
- Aeterna (video game series), a video game series whose first game released in 2021
- Aeterna, a designer typeface created in 1927 by Ludwig & Mayer
- "Aeterna", a song by Coldplay from their tenth studio album Moon Music (2024)
