= The Completionist =

American YouTuber (born 1988)

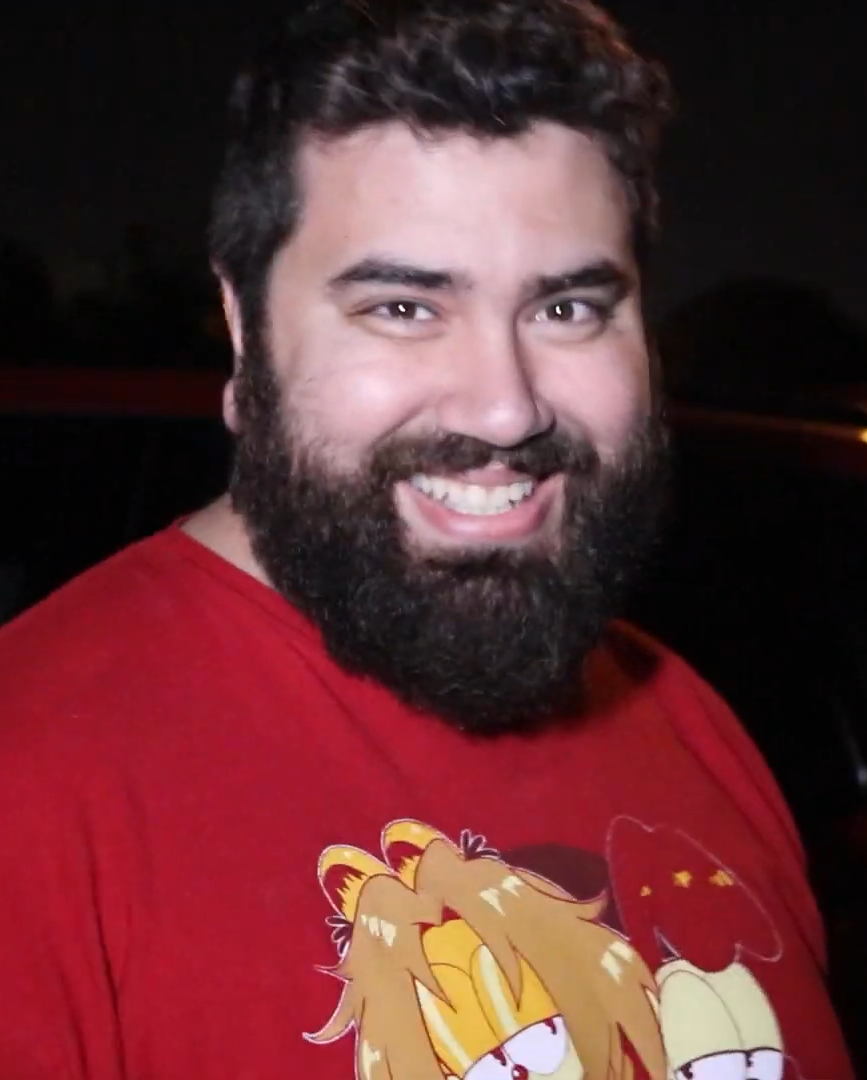
- The Completionist logo Khalil in 2019
- Born: Jirard Khalil; January 3, 1988 (age 38); Los Angeles, California, U.S.
- Education: California State University, Fullerton
- Occupations: YouTuber; critic; television presenter

YouTube information
- Channels: The Completionist; Super Beard Bros
- Years active: 2012–2024, 2025–present
- Genres: Gaming; review
- Subscribers: 1.42 million
- Views: 346 million
- Jirard Khalil's voice Recorded August 2018
- Last updated: October 22, 2025

Jirard Khalil (born January 3, 1988) is an American YouTuber, internet personality and reviewer known online as The Completionist, the titular character of a web series Khalil created in 2012, in which he previously referred to by his nickname, "Dragonrider". Khalil's content focuses on him reviewing and playing video games to 100% completion, uncovering every aspect found in the game. Throughout his career on YouTube, Khalil has uploaded reviews of over 340 games. He was also affiliated with the YouTube network and gaming collective Normal Boots.

Khalil joined the TV network G4 during their 2021–2022 revival as a host of Xplay and Attack of the Show!, and debuted his series God of Work on the network. A member of the Open Hand Foundation charity, he co-organized IndieLand, an annual livestream event showcasing indie games to raise money for dementia research. Following charity fraud allegations involving Open Hand, Khalil resigned from the charity in 2023 and was removed from the podcasts Friends Per Second Podcast and Super Beard Bros, which he had co-hosted since their creation. He posted an apology video in 2025 claiming the California Department of Justice has an ongoing inquiry into Open Hand, and announcing a return to video production after a year-long hiatus.

== Early life ==
Khalil was born on January 3, 1988, and is a native of Los Angeles, California. He is also the brother of Kellee Khalil, an entrepreneur who founded the wedding planner website Lover.ly. He is of Lebanese descent.

Khalil attended California State University, Fullerton. After Khalil got his college degree in theater and film, he worked at Best Buy. After his manager pushed him to pursue his YouTube dreams full time, Khalil started his YouTube channel, originally called ThatOneVideoGamer but later renamed The Completionist.

== Career ==
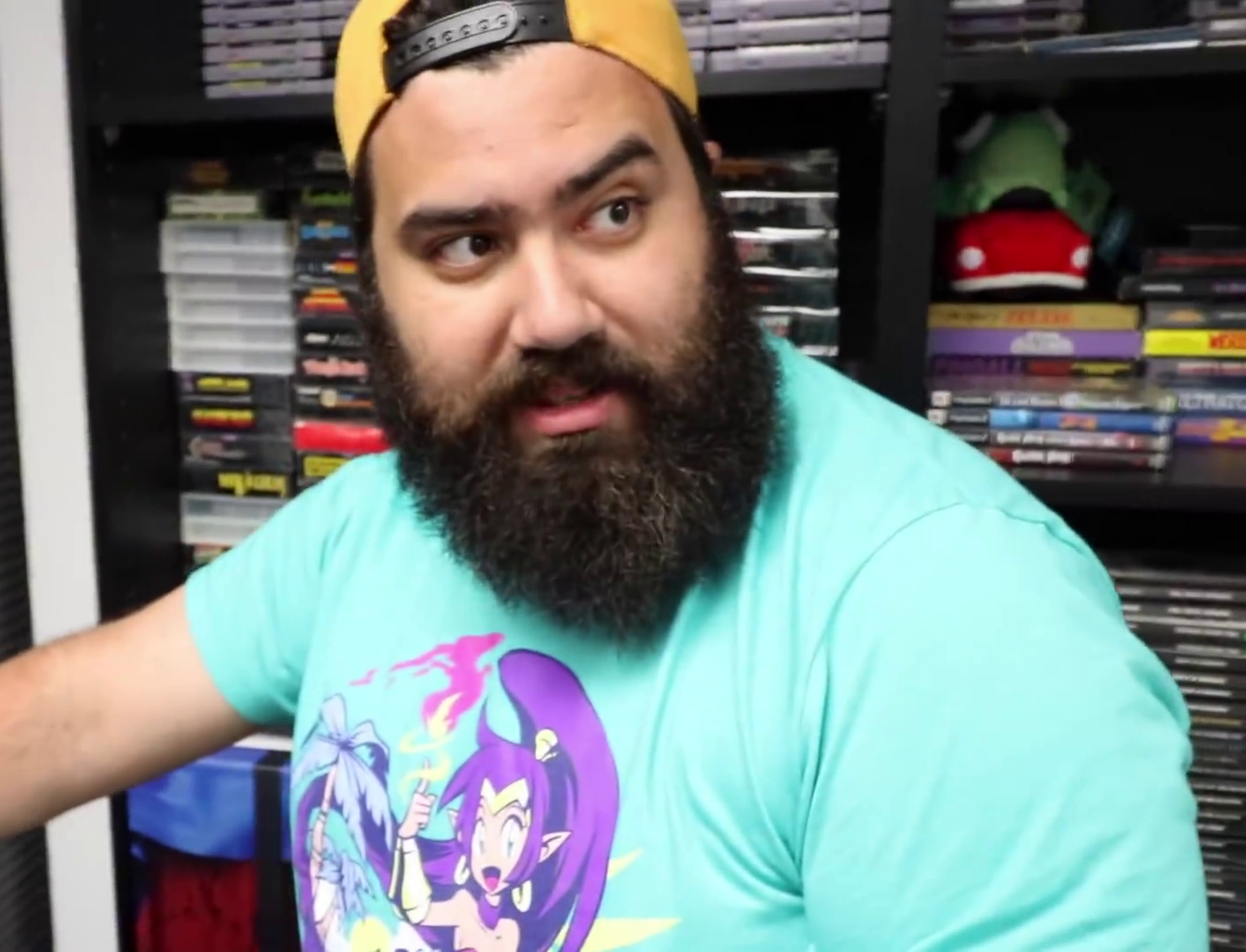
Khalil in a 2018 YouTube cameo

Khalil's YouTube career began in 2012. He had attempted to start his YouTube career multiple times, but had restarted due to a lack of success in gaining an audience. After meeting internet personality Arin Hanson, Khalil became inspired to launch his YouTube career again, with an emphasis towards playing video games to 100% completion. Khalil's content on The Completionist involves him reviewing and discovering every aspect of a video game, including completing the game on all difficulty options, finding every collectible and defeating every boss. At the end of his reviews, Khalil also shows the number of hours taken to complete the game along with the amount of collectibles he acquired. He stated that his style of completing games originated from his childhood, where he often played games repeatedly in order to convince his parents to buy him new games. Mike Andronico of CNN described Khalil's videos as "backed by his articulate, authoritative and entertaining narration, which make the channel's deep dives on retro games and modern blockbusters accessible for even non-gamers."

Khalil worked on The Completionist with collaborator Greg Wilmot. However, due to a falling out between the two members, the first 120 episodes of the series were removed, leading Khalil to recreate the episodes. In addition to The Completionist, he also created Let's Play videos on the channel Super Beard Bros. with collaborators Alex Faciane and Brett Bayonne.

Khalil was a member of Normal Boots, a YouTube gaming network featuring creators such as PeanutButterGamer, JonTron and ProJared. He signed with the Creative Artists Agency in 2020 alongside YouTuber Alpharad. In 2021, as a part of Sonic's 30th Anniversary, the official Sonic the Hedgehog YouTube channel featured a new series called Sonic Rings. In the series, Khalil discusses his history with the franchise. That same year, Khalil joined the TV network G4 during their revival as a co-host of Xplay and Attack of the Show. He debuted his series, God of Work, in August 2022, which aired on both G4 and his channel. Co-created by Khalil with Emily Rose Jacobson, the premise involves Khalil portraying Kratos from God of War in an office setting. Several months later, G4 was shut down in November 2022 after averaging 1,000 viewers, the lowest of any American cable network at the time.

On March 18, 2023, Khalil uploaded a video about buying every single Nintendo Wii U and 3DS game from the Nintendo eShop before the online store closed in 2023. The project took 328 days and cost $22,791, split between $9,673 in 866 purchased Wii U games and $13,118 in 1547 purchased 3DS games. Involving the use of 464 redeemed eShop cards, the video was funded by multiple sponsorships throughout 2022. Khalil planned to donate the consoles to the VGHF. In the midst of discussion regarding video game preservation following the eShop's closure, Khalil's video was regarded by game historians as an example of legal preservation. Dustin Bailey of GamesRadar+ explained that though the games have already been preserved illegally, Khalil's undertaking ensured that the VGHF would possess a legal collection of games for creating a digital lending library.

== Other ventures ==
=== Open Hand Foundation and donation controversy ===
External videos (in chronological order)
- Jobst's analysis of the Open Hand Foundation (2023-11-13)
- Anas' analysis of the Open Hand Foundation (2023-11-13)
- Khalil's first response (2023-12-09)
- Khalil's second response (2025-09-25)
- Jobst's response to Khalil's second response (2025-10-27)
- Anas' response to Khalil's second response (2025-10-31)

Following the death of his mother in 2013 from frontotemporal dementia, Khalil organized the annual livestream charity event IndieLand under the Open Hand Foundation, a charity founded by his father Charles Khalil. The event centers around showcasing various indie games along with interviews with developers and guest appearances from gaming personalities, with the intent to raise funds for dementia research.

In November 2023, YouTubers Karl Jobst and Mutahar "SomeOrdinaryGamers" Anas uploaded videos revealing Form 990-PF records which showed that the Open Hand Foundation had not made any charity contributions since its inception in 2014, accumulating $655,520 in unspent assets by the end of 2022 despite recording tens of thousands in administrative expenses. In a call with the two YouTubers, Khalil said he did not discover that the funds had not been donated until 2022, and was currently seeking an appropriate charity, still not having yet donated any funds. However, Jobst highlighted that the foundation's website lists the University of California, San Francisco (UCSF) as a recipient of research funding. During IndieLand events, Khalil had said the Open Hand Foundation was donating to UCSF, the Alzheimer's Association, and the Association for Frontotemporal Degeneration, and also asserted that the Open Hand Foundation was one of the "main funding support partners" of UCSF.

Khalil uploaded a response video about the situation on December 9, 2023, in which he acknowledged that the funds had not been donated, apologized for making "statements potentially implying donations were made when they had not yet been", and announced his resignation as a board member of the Open Hand Foundation. Five days earlier, on December 4, 2023, the Association for Frontotemporal Degeneration announced it had received a donation of $600,000 on November 29.

In December 2023, Friends Per Second Podcast co-hosts Jake Baldino, Lucy James and Ralph Panebianco announced that they would be separating from Khalil, following the mishandling of funds associated with the Open Hand Foundation. Khalil was a founder and co-host since its inception in June 2022. In January 2024, Super Beard Bros. co-hosts Faciane and Bayonne announced that the channel would be separating from Khalil, and that they would be shifting to independent funding going forward.

On September 25, 2025, Khalil uploaded another video after a year-long hiatus. He admitted that he did lie, intentionally so after IndieLand 2022, and apologized for misleading statements, not directly partnering with charities, and failing to keep track of the money. At the same time, he expressed confidence that claims of fraud and embezzlement would be disproven. Khalil claimed that an investigation from the California Department of Justice is ongoing and that he was legally unable to speak further on the matter. Khalil also announced that his channel will resume video production, albeit to a smaller scale as his videos will now be solo-produced.

=== Appearances and game development ===
Khalil appeared as a character in the video game Asagao Academy, a dating sim and visual novel created by and featuring members of Normal Boots in 2014. He also appeared as a non-playable character in the 2023 indie role-playing game Sea of Stars; following the debacle surrounding the Open Hand Foundation, the game's developer, Sabotage Studio, announced their decision to remove Khalil's appearance in the game.

In August 2022, Khalil appeared in a GameSpot video with other gaming personalities to discuss the impact of Final Fantasy VII. He contributed to the video game Elsie, which was developed by Knight Shift Games and published by Playtonic Games in 2024.

== Filmography ==
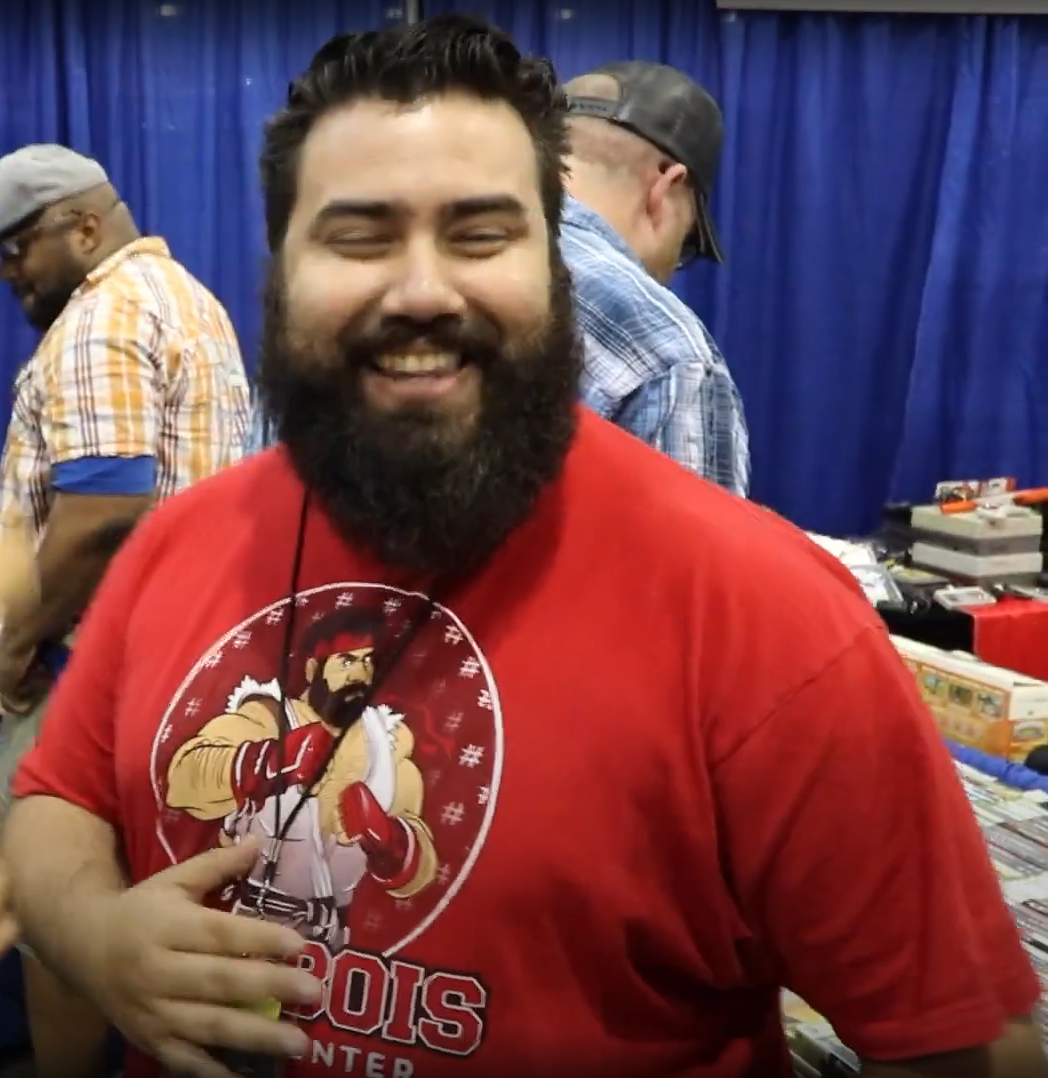
Khalil at the Game On Expo in 2018

=== Web series ===
Year	Title	Role
2012–present	The Completionist	Himself
2012–2023	Super Beard Bros.	Himself

=== Television ===
Year	Title	Role
2021–2022	Xplay	Host
2021–2022	Attack of the Show!	Host

=== Video games ===
Year	Title	Role	Notes
2016	Asagao Academy: Normal Boots Club	Jirard	
2021	Terrain of Magical Expertise	Completeboy	
2023	Sea of Stars	NPC	Appearance later removed
2024	Elsie		

== Awards and nominations ==
Year	Ceremony	Category	Result	Ref.
2019	Streamy Awards	Gaming	Nominated	

== See also ==
- List of YouTube personalities
