= Lover.ly =

Social planning website for weddings

- Industry: Wedding planning
- Founded: 2012, New York City
- Founder: Kellee Khalil
- Headquarters: United States
- Key people: Kellee Khalil (Founder & CEO); Peggy Fry (COO and President); Meredith Howard (Chief Brand Officer)
- Products: Bridal content and virtual wedding planner
- Website: lover.ly

Lover.ly is an all-in-one digital wedding planning platform and search engine. Launched in 2012, its database of editorial content uses a proprietary tagging program to aggregate content from wedding blogs, wedding magazines, as well as retailers, brands and vendors. Lover.ly is free for all users and uses AI and chat technology to service their customers.

== History ==
Kellee Khalil was inspired to design the wedding discovery engine after helping to plan her sister's wedding. Khalil officially launched Lover.ly on Valentine's Day of 2012.

In February 2012, Lover.ly raised $500,000 from Joanne Wilson and others.

In 2013, Lover.ly released an updated iOS7 application in an effort to further optimize the platform given that 30 percent of the company's overall traffic, and 60 percent of its total engagement, happens in its mobile app. It also launched a new "Popular" tab, which lets users see exactly what's trending on the site in real time, in August.

In 2016, Loverly launched the first ever virtual wedding planning iOS application, offering couples a wedding concierge service. Through the Loverly Weddings app, wedding planning packages start at a flat fee of $49.

== Operations ==
Lover.ly offers a searchable database of aggregated content from blogs, magazines, retailers, and brands, and provides wedding planning tips from its own wedding editorial experts. Once on Lover.ly, users can search by keyword, category, or color, and as of 2013, hundreds of thousands images were available to browse on the site. As part of Lover.ly's commerce functionality, users can also purchase items that they discover.

During a 2013 interview in USA Today's Change Agent column, Khalil said that "the idea [of Lover.ly] is simply that your wedding binder lives in the cloud... I'm building this for my generation of brides. For us, it's all about the visual web, whether you're on a computer, tablet, or your phone."

Lover.ly has partnered with retail brands such as Nordstrom, Minted, Etsy, and Anthropologie. Through these partnerships, brands can raise awareness, syndication, and sales, while users can more easily access content and make purchases. As of August 2013, Lover.ly has 250,000 shoppable products from 2,000 brands on site that appear alongside a collection of wedding related images.

=== Editorial blog network, native advertising, email, and events ===
Lover.ly works with its blog partners to implement monetized display sponsored content campaigns, allowing brands to reach a larger audience than traditionally possible. As of December 2013, the company is testing category sponsorships and CPA (cost per acquisition) ad models.

Lover.ly offers native advertising on its website, allowing brands to introduce their content to Lover.ly's audience in the context of Lover.ly's "inspiration made actionable" environment.

In addition to display advertising and web traffic, Lover.ly utilizes email marketing campaigns to drive its monetization efforts.

Lover.ly also partners with brands to reach brides, grooms and wedding attendees in offline environments. Lover.ly partnered with BaubleBar and executed a pop-up shop in SoHo and partnered with Donna Morgan to hold a secret soiree for industry insiders at the Ace Hotel.

== See also ==
- The Completionist, a webseries and YouTube channel run by Kellee Khalil's brother Jirard
