= Karl Jobst =

Australian YouTuber and speedrunner (born 1986)

- Born: 7 February 1986 (age 40); Queensland, Australia
- Occupations: YouTuber; speedrunner

YouTube information
- Channel: karljobst
- Years active: 2010–present
- Genre: Gaming
- Subscribers: 1.05 million
- Views: 269.4 million
- Last updated: 4 October 2026

Karl Jobst (born 7 February 1986) is an Australian YouTuber and speedrunner, whose work has primarily focused on exposing cheating and fraud in the gaming community, as well as his speedruns of GoldenEye 007 (1997) and Perfect Dark (2000). He also covers other speedrunning and challenge-related feats, including world record histories. Jobst is also known for his feud with the American gamer Billy Mitchell.

== Personal life ==
Jobst began playing video games at age two and a half; his first gaming experience was with the PC game Ultima V: Warriors of Destiny (1988), and his first console was a Nintendo 64 he received in 1997. He briefly studied IT and psychology at university and spent time working at a chicken factory, a mobile phone shop, and a call centre.

== Speedrunning career ==
Jobst began speedrunning in 1999 when competing for fast times in GoldenEye 007 (1997) with a friend before moving on to Perfect Dark (2000).

He is ranked fifth by number of GoldenEye 007 world records by the game's speedrunning authority. Jobst was recognised as the "Perfect Dark Champion" (meaning he was statistically deemed the number-one player in the world at the game, according to the community's rankings) from 10 November 2002 – 24 December 2003; 26 July 2016 – 30 July 2016; 31 July 2016 – 19 March 2020; and 21 March 2020 – 25 March 2020 (tied). As of 11 March 2022, Jobst had set 199 individual level world records throughout his career, of which 9 remain.

Jobst set the world record for the first level of GoldenEye 007 on 2 December 2017, completing the run in 52 seconds on the Agent difficulty, beating a 53-second record set by former Perfect Dark world champion Bryan Bosshardt on 27 September 2002. This feat was described by Owen S. Good of gaming magazine Polygon as "akin to the sub-four[-]minute mile, multiplied by breaking the sound barrier."

In late 2021, Jobst started a speedrunning podcast called The Legends Podcast. In September 2021, Legends co-host Tomatoanus announced the cancellation of future episodes and the taking down of previous episodes after Jobst was accused of racism. In a video, Jobst denied the allegations, stating that messages had been taken out of context.

== Investigative work ==
=== Badabun ===
In December 2017, Mexican media network Badabun uploaded a video purportedly showing network member Tavo Betancourt speedrunning Super Mario Bros. (1985); in January 2020, Jobst uploaded a video revealing that the Badabun video had been faked, showing various inconsistencies and irregularities found within the alleged speedrun footage and demonstrating that the footage was spliced from videos by several actual world record holders in the game, as well as from a tool-assisted speedrun.

=== Dream ===
In late 2020, Jobst covered an alleged incident of cheating by popular Minecraft speedrunner Dream.

=== Heritage Auctions and Wata Games ===
On 23 August 2021, Jobst released a YouTube documentary alleging fraud and conflict of interest between Heritage Auctions, a company selling retro video games for record-breaking prices (including a copy of Super Mario Bros. for over US$2 million); Wata Games, an agency that grades rare games; and video game collectors who intend to manufacture a bubble of retro games. Jobst alleged that Wata CEO Deniz Kahn and Heritage Auctions co-founder Jim Halperin manipulated the market through press releases and television appearances on Pawn Stars while limiting the availability of information by purchasing and shutting down retro gaming site NintendoAge. Wata Games denied the claims immediately after Jobst published the video. In a statement made to Video Games Chronicle, Heritage Auctions responded to Jobst's video by saying they had not engaged in any illegal activity.

=== Billy Mitchell ===
American gamer Billy Mitchell was accused by Jobst of cheating to obtain his records in the arcade games Donkey Kong (1981) and Pac-Man (1980), allegations that had already been made for years. Jobst's allegations against Mitchell also included claims that Mitchell's lawsuit against YouTuber Apollo Legend (real name Benjamin Smith) contributed to his poor mental health and suicide. For that claim, Mitchell sued Jobst for defamation, seeking damages of $450,000.

In January 2023, Jobst made a video that showcased evidence in the form of an old photograph that purportedly demonstrated that Mitchell did not play his claimed world record runs on original hardware despite claiming so for many years, including a photograph that he claimed showed that an arcade cabinet Mitchell played on had an eight-direction joystick (as opposed to the original four-direction joystick), which would have made the game much easier to play.

On 1 April 2025, Jobst was found liable for defaming Mitchell, in particular for the imputation that Mitchell had contributed to Smith's suicide, and was ordered to pay A$350,000, with the judge saying that Jobst had "caused substantial additional damage to Mitchell's reputation and caused him distress". Jobst could not cover the judgement debt, leading to him filing for voluntary bankruptcy on 9 May 2025.

Jobst filed a defamation suit against Mitchell in the United States in April 2026, rising from claims from Jobst that Mitchell had made knowingly false statements in regards to Jobst's bankruptcy and crowdfunding efforts in the wake of the April 2025 Queensland decision.

=== The Completionist ===
In November 2023, Jobst uploaded a video alongside YouTuber Mutahar "SomeOrdinaryGamers" Anas investigating the Open Hand Foundation, a charity which YouTuber Jirard "The Completionist" Khalil actively led alongside his family. Khalil hosted the IndieLand fundraiser under the organization, claiming that the proceeds went towards dementia research. However, Jobst and Anas discovered through public tax filings that the organization had not donated any of the money accumulated since its inception as a non-profit in 2014, which totalled $655,520.
