= The Messenger (2018 video game) =

Action-platform game

- Developer: Sabotage Studio
- Publisher: Devolver Digital
- Director: Thierry Boulanger
- Producer: Philip Barclay
- Designers: Thierry Boulanger; Phillippe Dionne
- Programmers: Sylvain Cloutier; Thierry Boulanger
- Artists: Michael Lavoie; Jean-Luc Savard; Savannah Perron
- Writer: Thierry Boulanger
- Composer: Rainbowdragoneyes (Note: Alias used by Eric W. Brown)
- Engine: Unity
- Platforms: Windows; Nintendo Switch; PlayStation 4; Xbox One
- Release: Windows, Switch; August 30, 2018; PlayStation 4; March 19, 2019; Xbox One; June 25, 2020
- Genres: Action, platform
- Mode: Single-player

The Messenger is a 2018 action platformer video game developed by Canadian developer Sabotage Studio and published by Devolver Digital. The player controls the eponymous ninja, who is appointed by a great hero to deliver a scroll. As the Messenger explores levels and defeats enemies, he gains a currency called Time Shards used to purchase useful upgrades and abilities. The game begins as a linear adventure featuring elements of time travel, with the audio and visuals changing from an 8-bit style to 16-bit to represent the ninja's journey from the past to the future. In the second half, The Messenger becomes a Metroidvania-style game where the player revisits previous levels to find key items.

Lead designer Thierry Boulanger created an early prototype of The Messenger in 2008. He hoped to create a game with a ninja as a protagonist, and pitched the concept to the Sabotage Studio co-founder Martin Brouard. Boulanger took inspiration from games such as Ninja Gaiden and Chrono Trigger, and fundamentally altered the game many times. The soundtrack was created by Eric "Rainbowdragoneyes" Brown, who created each song individually in the 8-bit and 16-bit styles. Sabotage Studio crunched to finish development to avoid competing with AAA games for press attention. The Messenger was first released for Windows and Nintendo Switch on August 30, 2018. Versions for PlayStation 4 and Xbox One were respectively released in 2019 and 2020.

The Messenger sold over 50,000 copies within a week and received generally positive reviews from critics. Reviewers praised the dialogue, controls, music, and art, while they were divided on the pacing. It won the "Best Debut Indie Game" award at The Game Awards 2018, and received several other award nominations and accolades. A downloadable content expansion called Picnic Panic was launched on July 11, 2019, and a prequel titled Sea of Stars was released in 2023.

== Gameplay ==
A GIF showing the Messenger moving through a warp, transporting him from the past (shown in an 8-bit style) to the future (shown in a 16-bit style)

The Messenger is an action platformer inspired by the Ninja Gaiden series. Players of the side-scrolling game control a ninja known as "The Messenger" as he goes on a quest to deliver a scroll on behalf of a great hero. The Messenger can run, jump, attack with his sword, and perform a technique called "Cloudstepping", which allows him to perform an extra jump in mid-air after attacking an enemy or object.

As the game progresses, the Messenger gains new abilities such as climbing walls, and a "rope dart" used to propel himself through obstacles and enemies. By collecting Time Shards earned by defeating enemies or exploring, the player can purchase additional upgrades such as being able to destroy projectiles. If the player dies, a demon named Quarble will appear and revive them at the last checkpoint that they reached. Afterwards, Quarble will follow the player around for a short amount of time, automatically taking any Time Shards the player collects as payment.

The game initially presents itself as a linear level-based adventure split across two eras; the past, which is presented with 8-bit graphics and audio, and the future, which uses a 16-bit presentation. Later on, The Messenger becomes a Metroidvania-style game, in which the player revisits both eras in any order and direction in order to find key items. In this section, the player can use special warps to move between the past and present, changing the layout of each level and allowing them to access new areas. In addition to the main story, green medallions are hidden inside the levels as optional objectives, and players gain a reward by collecting all 45.

== Plot ==
The Messenger begins in a village of ninjas, who foretell a prophecy of a "Western Hero" saving them from the evil demons. When the village is attacked by the Demon King, the Western Hero arrives and repels him. The hero gives a scroll to a ninja, appointing him as "The Messenger" and tells him to travel east and deliver it to the top of a mountain. During his journey, the Messenger is aided by a mysterious blue-robed shopkeeper who provides him with upgrades.

The Messenger arrives at the top of the mountain and encounters more blue-robed figures, who send him 500 years into the future to defeat the Demon King's general, Barma'thazël. The Messenger defeats Barma'thazël and circumnavigates the world, arriving at the ninja village from the west and saving it from another attack by the Demon King. Deducing that he has taken on the role of the Western Hero, he passes on the scroll to a soldier and appoints him as the new Messenger. He returns to the shopkeeper and is inducted into the blue-robes as a merchant providing the soldier with upgrades.

When the new Messenger ends up dying due to the shopkeeper's negligence, the blue-robes retrieve the scroll and task the Messenger with traveling between the past and future to collect the magical notes of a music box. After the Messenger collects all the notes, defeating the Demon King in the process, the shopkeeper explains the nature of the music box: it is the prison of a man named Phantom who had been cursed by the Demon King. The nature of the curse creates a link to the demon realm, allowing demons to invade the world every 500 years. In an effort to save humanity, Phantom created the scroll and attuned it with time magic, creating a continual cycle of Messengers who would travel through time and repel the demons, before passing on the scroll to a new hero; The blue-robes are previous Messengers who joined together to help find the notes and free Phantom from the curse. The Messenger uses the notes to enter the music box, freeing Phantom from imprisonment; The curse manifests as a giant mask and attacks, but the Messenger and the blue-robes team up to destroy it.

=== Picnic Panic ===
In the Picnic Panic DLC, the shopkeeper informs the Messenger that the demons are on the verge of defeating the blue-robes in an alternative timeline, and sends him to that timeline to stop them. Once the Messenger arrives, the demon general Barma'thazël lures him into a trap. Using voodoo magic, Barma'thazël creates an evil doppelgänger of the Messenger before fusing with it, but is defeated by the Messenger and the blue-robes. However, Barma'thazël reveals that the doppelgänger's defeat was necessary, absorbing its essence into a magic seed and escaping. As the heroes celebrate their victory, Barma'thazël plants the magic seed.

== Development and release ==
The Messenger was created by the Quebec City-based indie developer Sabotage Studio. The game began as a personal project of the lead designer and programmer Thierry Boulanger, who created an early prototype for the game while he was studying programming in 2008. Wanting to pursue the project, Boulanger first shared the concept with his employer, who rejected it. Boulanger later worked on a prototype over the course of six months, which he demonstrated to the game producer Martin Brouard. The prototype was made up of only grey blocks and a placeholder figure, which Boulanger attributed to his idea that the art would not be included until after the controls were fully designed. Impressed with the game's concept, Brouard quit his job, and both developers helped co-found Sabotage Studio.

Boulanger cited Ninja Gaiden as one of The Messenger's main inspirations, and was further influenced by Chrono Trigger. He wished to make a game with a ninja as a playable character, believing they could be an ideal protagonist due to their ambiguous personality allowing players to project onto them. Although the ideas of the ninja, scroll, and the change between the 8-bit and 16-bit styles remained part of the overall concept, Sabotage fundamentally altered the game many times. The Messenger was designed to be especially friendly towards speedrunners, and the developers emphasized mastery of movement techniques as necessary to clear the later levels. The developers added a theme of humor to the game through the dialogue, which was designed to demonstrate self-awareness and satirize tropes taken from the game's inspirations. Brouard specifically highlighted this humor through the shopkeeper character's stories, but noted that players could skip all the dialogue if they wished to focus exclusively on the platforming.

The score was composed by chiptune musician Eric W. Brown, who was credited under the alias Rainbowdragoneyes. Brown composed each song to fit the 8-bit and 16-bit styles of music, programming each individually rather than creating one song and then modifying it to fit the other musical style. The 8-bit music was developed using an altered version of the Famitracker sound program, while the Sega Genesis-inspired 16-bit music was made in the DefleMask software. Brown composed most of the 8-bit soundtrack first, and began programming the rest inside the two sound programs simultaneously.

Sabotage Studio first announced The Messenger in January 2018, and had earlier featured the game at the Montreal International Games Summit in late 2017. They signed a publishing contract with Devolver Digital after both companies met at PAX South. The Messenger was released on Windows and Nintendo Switch on August 30, 2018. After missing a planned release a month earlier, the team crunched to finish The Messenger to avoid having to compete with popular AAA games for press attention. The developers originally intended the shift between the 8-bit and 16-bit graphics to be a hidden surprise for players, but chose to advertise the mechanic to distinguish the game from other retro-style platformers. The Messenger was well received critically and sold 50,000 copies over the course of a week. A port for PlayStation 4 was added on March 19, 2019, and a downloadable content expansion called Picnic Panic was first released on July 11, 2019. The expansion features three new levels and boss fights, including a surfing level similar to Battletoads. A port for Xbox One was released on June 25, 2020.

== Reception ==
Reception

Aggregate scores
Aggregator	Score
Metacritic	NS: 86/100; PC: 83/100; PS4: 82/100
OpenCritic	88%

Review scores
Publication	Score
Destructoid	10/10
Game Informer	8/10
GameSpot	8/10
Hardcore Gamer	4.5/5
IGN	8/10
Jeuxvideo.com	18/20
Nintendo Life	9/10
Nintendo World Report	10/10
USgamer	5/5
VentureBeat	90/100

The Messenger received "generally favorable reviews" according to the review aggregate website Metacritic.

Critics enjoyed the game's dialogue. GameSpot liked the self-aware tone of the writing, praising how it poked fun at conventions of the action-platform genre. Kotaku similarly praised the humor, but noted the prevalence of comma splices in the writing. The shopkeeper's characterization and writing was especially praised. IGN called the shopkeeper's stories and jokes excellent, saying that every new line from the character felt like a reward. Other critics liked The Messenger's controls. Destructoid said that they were responsive, while Nintendo World Report called the controls well-designed and complimented the ninja's movement.

Reviewers praised the artstyle and music. USgamer enjoyed the art and chiptune score, writing that the music matched the quality of the critically well-received Shovel Knight, and the sprite design was simple but well-animated. VentureBeat singled out the backgrounds, and said that The Messenger had a "distinct feel that goes beyond typical video game cliches". The aesthetics and transition between the 8-bit and 16-bit styles were similarly praised. The bosses were received positively; Game Informer said that each challenged the player in a unique way, and USgamer praised how their high level of detail contrasted with the art.

The character of Quarble received a negative response. Nintendo Life thought Quarble was an interesting way of replacing the lives system and did not hinder the player's progress, but said that his dialogue was annoying. USgamer concurred, writing that the penalty for death was not significant but that Quarble was irritating instead of humorous. Critics were further divided on the game's pacing. USgamer and Nintendo Life said that the transition to the Metroidvania style was well executed, expressing that the platforming gameplay remained engaging. Kotaku said that this change in genre made the game an exceptional platformer rather than just a good one. IGN and VentureBeat criticized the transition, describing the later half of the game as slower and more repetitive. Polygon said that the game improved as it progressed, but felt that the best parts were hidden behind challenging mechanics. The reviewer called The Messenger a tough but fun platformer, and recommended it to players who enjoyed the history of gaming.

=== Accolades ===
The game won several awards prior to its release. It won the Start-Up Numix in 2016. It also won Best Music and Best Gameplay during the Montreal Indie Game Festival of 2017. At The Game Awards 2018, it was nominated for "Best Independent Game" and "Best Debut Indie Game", winning the latter. It was also nominated for "Best Debut" with Sabotage at the Game Developers Choice Awards, and for the G.A.N.G. / MAGFEST People's Choice Award at the 2019 G.A.N.G. Awards. The PlayStation 4 version won the award for "Control Design, 2D or Limited 3D" at the 2020 NAVGTR Awards, whereas its other nominations were for "Control Precision" and "Original Light Mix Score, New IP".

== Prequel ==
A prequel, Sea of Stars, was released for Windows, Nintendo Switch, PlayStation 4, PlayStation 5, Xbox One, and Xbox Series X/S in August 2023. Sabotage Studio announced the project in March 2020, and crowdfunded the game via Kickstarter. Unlike The Messenger which is a platform game, Sea of Stars is a turn-based role-playing video game.
