= Cursed to Golf =

2022 video game

- Developer: Chuhai Labs
- Publisher: Thunderful Publishing
- Director: Liam Edwards
- Programmer: Sean Fisher
- Artists: Jon Davies; Nathan Scott; Shiino Hiroco
- Composer: Mark Sparling
- Platforms: Windows; PlayStation 4; PlayStation 5; Xbox One; Xbox Series X/S; Nintendo Switch
- Release: August 18, 2022
- Genres: Roguelike, sports
- Mode: Single-player

Cursed to Golf is a 2022 roguelike video game developed by Chuhai Labs and published by Thunderful Publishing. Based on an itch.io demo created two years earlier, it was released for Windows, PlayStation 4, PlayStation 5, Xbox One, Xbox Series X/S, and Nintendo Switch. The player plays as a golfer in Golf Purgatory, which they have to escape by completing eighteen randomly-selected holes in a specific number of strokes, with the aid of statues that grant extra shots when broken and powerups known as Ace Cards. Cursed to Golf received praise for its mechanics and art, though reviews were mixed on the game's difficulty.

== Plot ==
The player, a professional golfer killed by lightning right before the end of a tournament, is sent to Golf Purgatory, where they are greeted by a giant ghost named The Scotsman. The Scotsman informs them that they must complete an eighteen-hole course in order to be resurrected, but will die if they use too many strokes on any hole, needing to return to the very beginning.

== Gameplay ==
The game has a pixel art aesthetic.

The holes, randomly selected from approximately 70 predesigned levels, are viewed from a two-dimensional side-scrolling perspective and form themed biomes, each with specific features and obstacles. In addition, "cursed" holes that are usually optional occasionally handicap the player; for example, they may temporarily restrict the player's aim to a specific direction. There are also boss battles at the end of each biome, which have players competing against an opponent; they feature special statues that stun the boss when broken. The bosses include The Scotsman, The Explorer, and The Forgotten.

The player has access to three clubs, a driver, an iron, and a wedge, and aims each shot by timing button presses to select power and direction. A moving arc, showing the ball's flight path, is displayed while aiming, and the player can redo a shot's power during this time, allowing them to precisely avoid obstacles. The player starts with five shots on each hole, but can gain more by smashing gold and silver statues that yield four or two more shots, respectively. The player can also spin the ball when it lands to slightly change its direction. In addition, single-use Ace Cards, which are received after defeating cursed levels or purchased from shops using cash earned for having excess shots, provide the player temporary upgrades or abilities. Examples of cards include a mulligan, which can be used to retry a shot, and a U-Turn card, allowing players to reaim the ball in midair. When the player dies, their cash and Ace Cards are lost (unless the cards are stored at a shop), but they receive permanent rewards from the bosses and do not have to fight them again. The game is considered to be part of the roguelike genre due to its permanent death mechanic, randomness arising from the variety of holes, and rewards from defeating bosses.

== Development and release ==
Cursed to Golf was developed by Kyoto-based indie studio Chuhai Labs and published by Thunderful Publishing. It was directed by Liam Edwards, with Sean Fisher as the lead programmer and Jon Davies as the art director. The soundtrack was composed by Mark Sparling, who also wrote the music for A Short Hike. Edwards, who previously worked at Rockstar Games, created the original version of the game on itch.io in 2020. He listed physics games and a podcast about roguelikes as inspiration for the game, stating that the golf aspect came from an initial prototype of a bouncing ball in a dungeon.

Cursed to Golf was first announced for Windows and Nintendo Switch on Thunderful's YouTube channel on August 30, 2021, with a then-undetermined release date in 2022. It was further showcased at the ID@Xbox Showcase and Future Games Show in March 2022, with a release scheduled for summer 2022 on Xbox Series X/S and Xbox One in addition to PC and Switch, and a limited-time Steam demo became available that month. On July 7, 2022, the exact release date of August 18 was announced, in addition to its availability on PlayStation 4 and 5. The game was released on that date, becoming available on Steam, GOG.com, and the Epic Games Store for PC in addition to the console systems.

== Reception ==
Reception

Aggregate scores
Aggregator	Score
Metacritic	PC: 80/100; PS5: 74/100; NS: 75/100; XSXS: 79/100
OpenCritic	67% recommend

Review scores
Publication	Score
GameSpot	9/10
Hardcore Gamer	4/5
Nintendo Life	8/10
Nintendo World Report	8/10
Push Square	8/10
TouchArcade	4/5
Video Games Chronicle	5/5
NME	4/5
Vandal	7.5/10

Cursed to Golf received "generally favorable" reviews for most platforms according to review aggregator Metacritic; the PlayStation 5 version received "mixed or average" reviews. Fellow review aggregator OpenCritic assessed that the game received strong approval, being recommended by 67% of critics.

Prior to its launch, Cursed to Golf had been described as "the Dark Souls of golf" due to its difficulty. Critics universally noted this difficulty, though viewed it differently: some, like Graham Banas of Push Square, found the difficulty curve to be "satisfying", while others, like Eurogamer Italy's Simone Cantini, thought the game to be unnecessarily frustrating. Polygon reviewer Russ Frushtick likened the game's intensity to other roguelikes such as Spelunky HD and Slay the Spire, though he specifically highlighted frustrations arising from limited vision and guesswork. In addition, Rachel Watts of Rock Paper Shotgun and Juan Rubio of the Spanish-language site Vandal criticized the game's replayability as a roguelike and its slow pace. However, several reviewers, including GameSpot's Steven Petite, praised the simplicity of the game's controls, and individual mechanics like Ace Cards and spinning the ball were commended by Watts and Alan Wen of NME, respectively.

Cursed to Golf's pixel art aesthetic was praised by reviewers such as Petite, Wen, and Chris Scullion of Video Games Chronicle. Petite and Scullion also lauded its chiptune soundtrack, though Banas found it to become repetitive. Meanwhile, the latter enjoyed the game's "witty and macabre" writing.
