= Clothing scam companies =

Gangs claiming to collect for charities

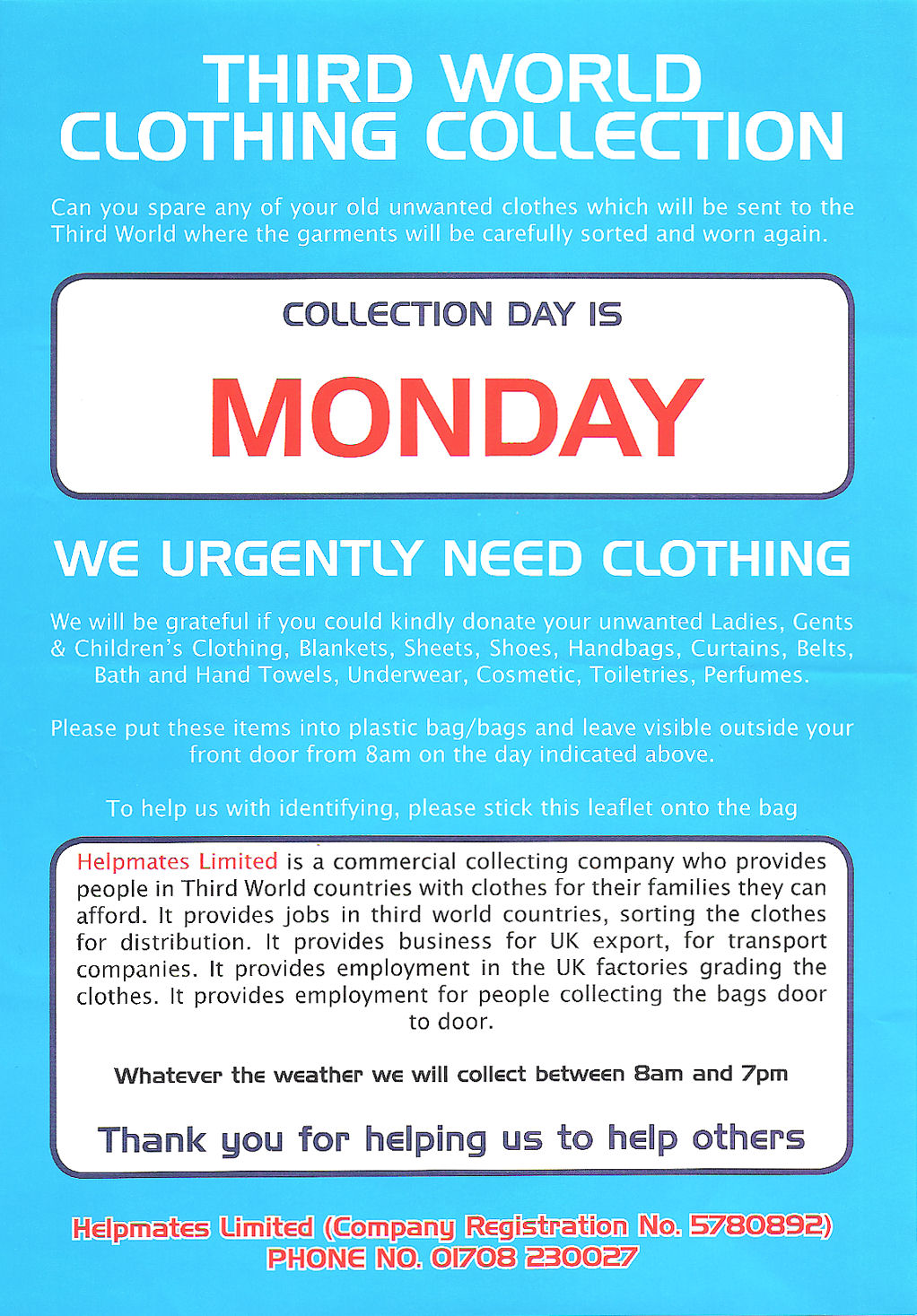
A leaflet from a commercial collecting company

Clothing scam companies are companies or gangs that purport to be collecting used good clothes for charities or to be working for charitable causes, when they are in fact working for themselves, selling the clothes overseas and giving little if anything to charitable causes. They are a particular problem in the United Kingdom, where they rely on people's awareness of proper charities' established practise of collecting used clothes for good causes. These companies cause major problems for established charities in terms of lost donations and making the public distrustful of all clothes collectors.

== Advertising ==
A popular tactic of clothing scam companies is to leaflet a particular area and then move on before people become aware that the company is a clothing scam company. These leaflets will often illegally claim that they are either charities or working for established charities. Often they will state in small print that they are a commercial company, but will prominently place wording that implies they are charities, often quoting very vague charitable aims such as 'third world collection'.

These companies are very difficult to prosecute as frequently they are not in fact companies at all, quoting fictitious company names or someone else's company name, when in fact they little more than gang of people getting together to resell used clothes. Many clothing scam companies use casual labour to deliver the leaflets and collect bags of clothing. They are not officially employed by the clothing scam company, which does not keep a record of the people they use that can be checked.

A 2016 investigation by the Sunday Post found that only a small amount, if any, of the value of the clothes donated was given to charity, and discovered evidence of links to organised crime networks.

=== United States ===
Clothing scams have operated in the United States as well. However, rather than hire people to collect clothes, they will place a bin by a gas station, shopping mall or high-traffic area. It is common for collection bins to change names quickly. This is difficult to detect for two reasons: there are legitimate charities such as the Salvation Army that have earned a reputation for honest collection of used clothes, as well as the fact that those who often donate used clothes generally do not consider it a great sacrifice in the first place, simply disposing of often threadbare attire that would have otherwise been outright discarded.

== See also ==
- Tvind - Used clothes collection
