= Charity fraud =

Act of defrauding people who believe they are donating to charity

Charity fraud, also known as a donation scam, is the act of using deception to obtain money from people who believe they are donating to a charity. Often, individuals or groups will present false information claiming to be a charity or associated with one, and then ask potential donors for contributions to this non-existent charity. Charity fraud encompasses not only fictitious charities but also deceptive business practices. These deceitful acts by businesses may involve accepting donations without using the funds for their intended purposes or soliciting funds under false pretenses of need.

== Examples ==
- On April 20, 1918, The New York Times published an article about a charity fraud committed by the Secretary of the Cripples' Welfare Society, George W. Ryder. Ryder pleaded guilty to using mail fraud to use the donations for his personal gain.
- On November 13, 1992, The New York Times released an article about fraudulent solicitations supporting a cause. Often, beside the cash register in stores, a collection is taken for a charity or for people in need. Although there have been many store owners that legitimately donate the spare change to the specified charity, there are a few who act fraudulently. In this specific case, the small-change donations were being kept by the vendors. The article states that the vendors paid a $2 per month fee to use the charity's name.
- In May 2015 the Federal Trade Commission (FTC) and law enforcement agencies from every state and the District of Columbia charged four cancer charities and their operators with deceptively raising more than $187 million from donors. The charities, which included Cancer Fund of America, were alleged to have spent most of the money on their operators, their families and professional fundraisers rather than on cancer patients.
- In July 2018 the Federal Trade Commission, together with charity regulators and law enforcement officials from 70 offices across the US and its territories, announced more than 100 actions against charities accused of falsely claiming that donations would help veterans and servicemembers. The effort, named "Operation Donate with Honor", also included a consumer education campaign.
- After Hurricane Ian in the U.S. in 2022, the FBI Tampa Bay office warned that charity fraud scammers were at work, going door to door and making phone calls.
- In the UK, data from the City of London Police published by the Charity Commission for England and Wales in December 2025 recorded 561 charity fraud reports between November 2024 and October 2025, with losses totalling £2,160,169. The Commission said fraudsters used methods such as fake appeal websites, emails falsely using the names of genuine charities and appeals from fake charities.

== Prevention in the United States ==
There are controls and laws governing charities and businesses that accept donations. The Internal Revenue Service (IRS) has regulations that can be found on its website.

The United States Federal Bureau of Investigation (FBI) provides online information about avoiding charity fraud, such as fraudulent schemes that emerge in the wake of natural disasters, claiming to be providing disaster relief. The Internet Crime Complaint Center maintains a list of guidelines to avoid charity fraud when making a donation.

== US-based nonprofit compliance and verification tools ==
To ensure transparency, legitimacy, and adherence to legal requirements, many organizations, including grantmakers, donors, and regulatory bodies, utilize compliance and verification tools to evaluate nonprofit organizations. These tools often rely on official data sources such as the IRS, the Office of Foreign Assets Control (OFAC), and other government registries to verify nonprofit status, tax-exempt eligibility, and potential sanction risks.

Some commonly used APIs and tools for U.S nonprofit verification and compliance include:

- GuideStar/Candid API
- IRS Business Master File
- IRS Publication 78
- Nonprofit Check Plus API
- CharityAPI.org
- Every.org

== See also ==
- Clothing scam companies
- Confidence trick
