= Louis Theroux's BBC Two specials =

Television series

In these first special programmes (2003), Louis Theroux returned to American themes, working at feature-length, this time with a more serious tone than in his earlier Weird Weekends work. For example, Louis and the Brothel takes a sympathetic look at the sex workers working at a legal brothel in Nevada whereas Under the Knife takes a more critical look at the world of plastic surgery. Other programmes cover a wide variety of topics including law and disorder and Nazis.

In March 2006, Theroux signed a deal with the BBC to produce ten films over the course of three years. In February 2009, a new contract came into force which guaranteed him another ten hour-long documentaries with the BBC.

== Episodes ==
=== 2000s ===
No.	Title	Directed by	Original release date
1	Louis and the Brothel	Geoffrey O'Connor	9 November 2003
Ex-prostitute Susan Austin and her ex-client and now husband, Lance Gilman, run America's newest legal brothel – The Wild Horse Ranch in Reno, Nevada. In a three-week sojourn Louis gets to know this remarkable couple and meets their customers. He also hears the stories of the working women.
2	Louis, Martin & Michael	Will Yapp	16 November 2003
After losing out to Martin Bashir for an opportunity to produce an official Michael Jackson documentary, Louis tries his best to obtain an interview with Michael, but cannot. In the process, Louis meets with Uri Geller and Michael's father Joe Jackson.
3	Louis and the Nazis	Stuart Cabb	21 December 2003
Louis travels to California to get to know some of the key personalities of the American neo-Nazi movement.
4	Louis Theroux: Gambling in Las Vegas	Stuart Cabb	4 February 2007
Louis heads for Vegas to reveal the world behind the myths of casino culture – the slot slaves, high rollers and casino men who keep this town in the middle of the desert green with money.
5	The Most Hated Family in America	Geoffrey O'Connor	1 April 2007
Louis gets to know the Westboro Baptist Church of Topeka, Kansas – whose members are nearly all from one family and are infamous for extreme homophobia and picketing the funerals of fallen soldiers.
6	Louis Theroux: Under the Knife	Emma Cooper	7 October 2007
In California, where you can be whatever and whoever you want at the flick of knife and a few thousand dollars, Louis attempts to get under the skin of extreme plastic surgery.
7	Louis Theroux: Behind Bars	Stuart Cabb	13 January 2008
Louis goes inside California's San Quentin – one of America's most notorious prisons – to meet serial murderers, gang members, at risk inmates and guards.
8	African Hunting Holiday	Paddy Wivell	6 April 2008
Louis journeys to Limpopo Province in South Africa to join the holidaymakers who flock there to hunt big game.
9	Law and Disorder in Philadelphia	Emma Cooper	30 November 2008
Louis joins Philadelphia's police department, patrolling an area that has over 400 homicides a year, drug dealers on every corner and where carrying a gun is part of everyday life. But during his time spent with the local cops, he sees a complex picture evolve.
10	Law and Disorder in Johannesburg	Paddy Wivell	7 December 2008
Louis Theroux travels to Johannesburg, where the residents find themselves increasingly besieged by crime as he looks at the issue of law and disorder.
11	A Place for Paedophiles	Emma Cooper	19 April 2009
Louis visits the Coalinga Mental Hospital in California, which houses more than 500 convicted child sex offenders. Spending time with those undergoing treatment, Louis wrestles with whether he can ever allow himself to believe men whose whole history is defined by deceit.
12	The City Addicted to Crystal Meth	Geoffrey O'Connor	9 August 2009
Louis examines how drug addiction has torn apart the city of Fresno in Central Valley, California.

=== 2010s ===
No.	Title	Directed by	Original release date
13	America's Medicated Kids	Danny Horan	18 April 2010
Louis meets parents who have turned to medication to keep their children under control.
14	Law and Disorder in Lagos	Jason Massot	10 October 2010
Louis Theroux travels to Lagos, where the residents find themselves increasingly besieged by crime as he looks at the issue of law and disorder.
15	The Ultra Zionists	Andy Wells	3 February 2011
Louis Theroux spends time with a small and very committed subculture of ultra-nationalist Jewish settlers in the West Bank.
16	America's Most Hated Family in Crisis	Emma Cooper	3 April 2011
Four years after his last visit, Louis returns to spend a week with the Westboro Baptist Church in the wake of several defections from the church.
17	Louis Theroux: Miami Mega Jail Part 1	Emma Cooper	22 May 2011
Louis Theroux spends time in one of the most notorious sections of Miami County Jail: the fifth and sixth floor of 'Main Jail', where many of the most volatile inmates are incarcerated.
18	Louis Theroux: Miami Mega Jail Part 2	Emma Cooper	29 May 2011
Louis Theroux goes deeper into the jail system and meets an inmate facing a possible death sentence. He also follows a group of younger inmates who have escaped prison by pleading guilty and agreeing to attend a four-month military style boot camp.
19	America's Most Dangerous Pets	Jamie Pickup	30 October 2011
Travelling to America's heartlands, Louis Theroux spends time with people who have private collections of tigers and chimpanzees.
20	Extreme Love: Autism	Jamie Pickup	19 April 2012
Louis travels to one of the most innovative autism schools of its kind – the DLC Warren in New Jersey – opened in 2007 at a cost of $54 million. There he finds out how specialised intervention can help both the pupils and the families that care for them.
21	Extreme Love: Dementia	Dan Child	26 April 2012
As one of the big retirement destinations for middle class Americans, Phoenix, Arizona has also become a capital of dementia care. Louis visits the city to spend time in state-of-the-art care home Beatitudes and with home-based carers, whose love is tested by a condition that steadily erodes the personality and character of their partners.
22	Twilight of the Porn Stars	Jason Massot	10 June 2012
Fifteen years after documenting the world of male porn performers in Los Angeles, Louis Theroux returns to find a business struggling with the deluge of free porn online. He also visits people he saw on his first documentary to see how their lives have progressed.
23	LA Stories: City of Dogs	Rob Farquhar	23 March 2014
Louis enters the bizarre world of LA’s dogs, meeting the characters whose lives revolve around the city’s huge canine population.
24	LA Stories: Edge of Life	Jamie Pickup	30 March 2014
Louis heads to West Hollywood’s Cedars-Sinai Medical Center to experience the American way of death.
25	LA Stories: Among the Sex Offenders	Rob Farquhar	6 April 2014
Louis looks at how California deals with sex offenders after release from prison.
26	By Reason of Insanity Part 1	Jamie Pickup	22 March 2015
Louis goes to Ohio and researches the facilities where those found not guilty by insanity are evaluated and treated.
27	By Reason of Insanity Part 2	Jamie Pickup	29 March 2015
Louis continues his investigation, exploring the boundaries between insanity and criminality.
28	Transgender Kids	Tom Barrow	5 April 2015
Louis travels to San Francisco where medical professionals are helping children with gender dysphoria transition from boy to girl or girl to boy.
29	Drinking to Oblivion	Tom Barrow	24 April 2016
Louis spends time with patients of alcoholism at King's College Hospital.
30	A Different Brain	Jamie Pickup	15 May 2016
Louis takes a look at the issues that some of the estimated one million people in the UK living with the long-term effects of a brain injury have to deal with.
31	Savile	Arthur Cary	2 October 2016
In light of the unmasking of Jimmy Savile as a predatory sex offender, and 16 years after his documentary When Louis Met... Jimmy, Louis Theroux sets out to understand how a man who was at the centre of British entertainment and charitable fundraising for decades was able to get away with a long litany of crimes.
32	Dark States: Heroin Town	Dan Child	8 October 2017
Louis investigates how the USA's crackdown on over-prescribing drugs has led to an epidemic of heroin abuse.
33	Dark States: Trafficking Sex	Jamie Pickup	15 October 2017
Louis travels to Houston, Texas which is considered the hub of sexual exploitation and trafficking in the US, where he spends time with the prostitutes, pimps and law enforcement within the city.
34	Dark States: Murder in Milwaukee	Jason Massot	22 October 2017
Louis follows the racial tensions sparked by two police shootings in the city of Milwaukee, one of the most impoverished in the United States.
35	Talking to Anorexia	Ellena Wood	29 October 2017
Louis spends time with people suffering from eating disorders and visits them at St Ann’s Hospital and Vincent Square Clinic.
36	Altered States: Love Without Limits	Arron Fellows	4 November 2018
Louis embeds himself with families living a polygamous lifestyle, discovering that for many, more partners means more love and more happiness, but for others, multiple relationships have led to jealousy, upset and broken hearts.
37	Altered States: Choosing Death	Arron Fellows	18 November 2018
Louis heads to California, one of the six states in the US that now offer the terminally ill the option of ending their lives. He is invited into the family homes of those who want to end their own lives but discovers that choosing the right time to die is not such a simple decision.
38	Altered States: Take My Baby	Wesley Pollitt	25 November 2018
Louis spends time with birth mothers preparing to choose adoption, uncovering stories of the poverty, addiction, and abuse that led to their situations.
39	The Night in Question	Lottie Gammon	4 March 2019
Louis heads to American college campuses and comes face-to-face with students whose universities are accusing them of sexual assault.
40	Mothers on the Edge	Mark Casebow	12 May 2019
Louis Theroux visits specialist psychiatric units which treat mothers experiencing serious postpartum depression whilst allowing them to live alongside their babies.
41	Surviving America's Most Hated Family	Geoffrey O'Connor	14 July 2019
Louis returns to visit the controversial Westboro Baptist Church, investigating what effect the death of its founder has had on its members and those who have since left.

=== 2020s ===
No.	Title	Directed by	Original release date
42	Selling Sex	Joshua Baker	12 January 2020
Louis meets the women legally providing sexual services to paying clients.
43	Life on the Edge Part 1: Beyond Belief	Tom Barrow	6 September 2020
In the first episode of his four-part career retrospective series "Life on the Edge", Louis looks back at his earliest documentaries and explores how some people’s most fervent beliefs can bring them into conflict with mainstream society. This revisited Bo Gritz from Survivalists episode of Weird Weekends.
44	Life on the Edge Part 2: The Dark Side of Pleasure	Tom Barrow	13 September 2020
In the second episode of "Life on the Edge", Louis explores how America has managed to take our darkest desires, commodify them and turn them into a saleable product. He revisits Marshall Sylver from Series 3 of Weird Weekends.
45	Life on the Edge Part 3: Law and Disorder	Tom Barrow	20 September 2020
In the third episode of "Life on the Edge", Louis reflects on the criminal justice system in the USA, which has more prisoners than any other country in the world.
46	Life on the Edge Part 4: Family Ties	Tom Barrow	27 September 2020
In the final episode of "Life on the Edge", Louis examines how the greatest source of love in our lives – our families – can often be the cause of our deepest pain. He revisits Prussian Blue (duo) from Louis and the Nazis.
47	Shooting Joe Exotic	Jack Rampling	5 April 2021
A decade after Louis first met Joe Exotic in his previous documentary America's Most Dangerous Pets he revisits unseen footage thereof and interviews Carole Baskin, as well as Joe's friends and family to uncover how he used his considerable charm and deception to assemble a vast menagerie of animals and humans.
48	Forbidden America: Extreme and Online	Daniel Dewsbury	13 February 2022
Louis meets the latest incarnation of the American far right: a political movement born out of the internet and increasingly making its presence felt on the political stage.
49	Forbidden America: Rap's New Frontline	Daniel Dewsbury	20 February 2022
Louis immerses himself in Florida’s multimillion-dollar rap scene – as notorious for its controversy as its creativity.
50	Forbidden America: Porn's MeToo	Rachel Lob-Levyt	27 February 2022
Louis heads to Los Angeles as the world of adult entertainment grapples with its own wave of #MeToo.
51	The Settlers	Joshua Baker	27 April 2025
14 years after his previous documentary in the region, The Ultra Zionists, Louis documents Zionist Israeli settlements in the West Bank, in light of the October 7 attacks in 2023. Too, steps towards settlements in the Gaza Strip from Daniella Weiss are shown.

== Home releases ==
- Louis Theroux: The Strange & The Dangerous - released 19 January 2009
  - Gambling in Las Vegas
  - The Most Hated Family in America
  - Under the Knife
  - Behind Bars
  - African Hunting Holiday
  - Special Feature: The Weird World of Louis Theroux
  - Features 'In-Vision' commentaries with contributions from Norman Pace – Gambling in Las Vegas, Peter Tatchell – The Most Hated Family in America, Cindy Jackson – Under the Knife, Paul Taylor – Behind Bars and Terry Nutkins – African Hunting Holiday.
- Louis Theroux: Law & Disorder - released 14 September 2009
  - Law and Disorder in Philadelphia
  - Law and Disorder in Johannesburg
  - A Place for Paedophiles
  - The City Addicted to Crystal Meth
- Louis Theroux: The Odd, the Bad and the Godly - released 15 August 2011
  - America's Medicated Kids
  - Law and Disorder in Lagos
  - The Ultra Zionists
  - Return to the Most Hated Family
  - Miami Mega Jail Part 1
  - Miami Mega Jail Part 2

== See also ==
- List of Louis Theroux documentaries
- Louis Theroux's Weird Weekends
- When Louis Met...
