= List of Louis Theroux documentaries =

British-American television presenter Louis Theroux has presented a number of documentaries since 1998. His work includes studies of unusual and taboo subcultures, crime and the justice system, and celebrities. He also acted as a correspondent for the TV Nation documentary series.

== Louis Theroux's Weird Weekends ==
=== Series 1 (1998) ===
#	Title	Broadcast	Synopsis
1.1	"Christianity"	15 January 1998	In Dallas, Louis meets TV evangelists Marcus and Joni Lamb, and joins a group of hardline Christians called "The Family" as they visit the Deep Ellum entertainment district.
1.2	"UFOs"	22 January 1998	Louis follows several people who believe in UFOs. One of these is a man called Thor Templar, the self-titled "Lord Commander of the Earth Protectorate" who claims to have killed more than twenty aliens.
1.3	"Porn"	29 January 1998	This episode offers a look at very different sides of the porn industry, as Theroux interviews both male and female porn stars. He reveals the problems a lot of porn actors face, be it not getting a job in straight porn and therefore having to do gay porn, or not getting an erection when it is needed.
1.4	"Survivalists"	5 February 1998	In Idaho, Theroux meets military enthusiasts and right-wing patriots who are preparing for a global catastrophe, including trips to survivalists' store Safetrek and a mountain refuge for conspiracy theorists called Almost Heaven. Theroux also visits the Aryan Nation Church and helps to build a straw-bale home. The episode focuses on the survivalism movement and communities formed around it. That several self-proclaimed survivalists were also hippies and environmentalists is a recurring theme.
1.5	Louis Theroux's Weird Christmas	23 December 1998	Theroux invites someone from each of the four episodes of series 1 to New York for Christmas.

=== Series 2 (1999) ===
#	Title	Broadcast	Synopsis
2.1	"Infomercials"	12 May 1999	Theroux attempts to become a presenter on Florida's Home Shopping Network TV channel and meets Anthony Sullivan. He also meets people who invent, sell and make a fortune from products such as the Win Gym.
2.2	"Swingers"	26 May 1999	Theroux meets a couple from Southern California who host swinging parties. He visits one of these to find out what drives couples to want to swap partners. This programme also offers a brief look into other kinds of swinging through an organisation that has a database of members that are rated on a scale of 1 to 10. Under this system, people rated highly are invited to exclusive parties intended to keep out unattractive, socially awkward, or otherwise undesirable people.
2.3	"Black Nationalism"	2 June 1999	Theroux goes to Harlem in New York to meet its proponents, and meets the Reverend Al Sharpton, the main point of contact in the black nationalist movement. Theroux also meets Khalid Abdul Muhammad, dubbed by the media 'the most dangerous man in America' and visits the Israelite School of Universal Practical Knowledge, who believe that blacks are the true Israelites and that all English monarchs until early modern times were black. Theroux also joins Al Sharpton on a march on Wall Street to protest at the shooting by New York police of Amadou Diallo, who was shot 19 times.
2.4	"Demolition Derby"	9 June 1999	Theroux has to overcome his nerves to enter a demolition derby in car-mad Michigan.
2.5	"Off-Off Broadway"	15 June 1999	Theroux meets the hordes of out-of-work actors in New York as they try to land a part – and even goes on an audition himself – for a job on a Norwegian cruise ship, in front of Craig Revel Horwood.
2.6	"Wrestling"	6 July 1999	Theroux takes a look at different types of wrestling from the high-profile WCW to low-profile amateurs organizing events in their spare time. He also visits the WCW Power Plant, a training facility where some of the WCW wrestlers started out. The training he receives there from DeWayne Bruce shows him that some wrestlers will not break kayfabe (the illusion of fiction being fact) and will take exception when their profession's authenticity is questioned.

=== Series 3 (2000) ===
#	Title	Broadcast	Synopsis
3.1	"Self-Fulfillment"	25 September 2000	Theroux meets a Las Vegas hypnotist who claims he can make dreams come true and meets a California man who teaches chat-up techniques.
3.2	"India: Enlightenment"	2 October 2000	Theroux travels to India to witness Westerners seeking enlightenment. In Goa he meets 57-year-old American astrologer (and former psychology professor) "Deepak" who studies meditation. He moves on to meet Mike, who is a follower of Swami Ganapathi Sachchidananda, and Amma who claims spiritual powers through hugging people. He joins Amma on a pilgrimage with 400 believers on their three-month tour of India.
3.3	"Whites"	9 October 2000	Theroux meets Afrikaner separatists who dream of building cultural enclaves in post-apartheid South Africa, including leader Eugène Terre'Blanche.
3.4	"Body Building"	16 October 2000	Theroux travels to California, home of the body beautiful, to see if he can join the world of extreme body building. After working out with Guy Grundy, a leading amateur, he soon realises he is not cut out to be a muscle man and goes off in search of another role in the bodybuilding world. Theroux travels to Charles Peeple's farm in Connecticut, where Peeple has transformed his farm into a playboy mansion for female body builders. While here, Theroux gets a part in a female muscle film being made at the farm.
3.5	"Looking for Love"	23 October 2000	Theroux visits a Bangkok marriage agency where Western men meet Thai brides.
3.6	"Rap"	30 October 2000	Theroux travels to America's South to have a look at the gangsta rap scene known as the "Dirty South". He starts his own Gangsta rap, having a CD cover designed for him as well as getting the rappers Reece and Bigelow to write a song for him to perform on a rap radio show. Other parts include him interviewing pimp turned rapper Mello T, as well as rap superstar Master P.

== When Louis Met... ==
=== Series 1 (2000–2001) ===
#	Title	Broadcast	Synopsis
1.1	When Louis Met Jimmy	13 April 2000	Theroux visits his former childhood hero—73-year-old Jimmy Savile, the miner who became a TV and radio star. Theroux also talks briefly about the allegations of paedophilia against Savile before the Jimmy Savile sexual abuse scandal broke.
1.2	When Louis Met Paul and Debbie	20 February 2001	Theroux joins Paul Daniels and Debbie McGee in their home beside the River Thames and on the road as the magician appears on Celebrity Ready, Steady, Cook and his wife launches a ballet company.
1.3	When Louis Met the Hamiltons	11 December 2001	Theroux follows the former Tory MP Neil Hamilton and his wife Christine Hamilton as they try to make a living as "objects of curiosity". The film features Theroux on the sofa with a tipsy Christine, and follows the pair when they are arrested over an alleged sexual scandal (both were later cleared).

=== Series 2 (2002) ===
#	Title	Broadcast	Synopsis
2.1	When Louis Met Ann Widdecombe	5 March 2002	A prickly encounter with the Conservative politician Ann Widdecombe, in which Theroux upsets her by asking about her possibly non-existent sex life and hears about her love of poetry and cats.
2.2	When Louis Met Chris Eubank	12 March 2002	Theroux joins the ex-boxer Chris Eubank at home, in the ring and on a trip to buy jodhpurs. Eubank attempts a tongue twister and pontificates on being a role model for children.
2.3	When Louis Met Keith Harris and Orville in Panto	19 March 2002	Theroux meets the ventriloquist Keith Harris who no longer enjoys the TV light entertainment limelight but is still earning a good living. He has a flashy car, an ex-model partner, a large home and a role in Crewe's pantomime.
2.4	When Louis Met Max Clifford	26 March 2002	Theroux meets publicist Max Clifford as he handles Pop Idol judge Simon Cowell and child star Declan Galbraith and organises a charity event involving Westlife.
2.5	Living with Louis	2002 on UK Horizons	Produced exclusively for pay TV channel UK Horizons. Jimmy, Paul and Debbie, The Hamiltons, Chris Eubank and Keith Harris talk about being interviewed by Theroux. Theroux also discusses how he felt those four shows went and what the subjects were like to spend time with. The show is interspersed with clips from the shows.

== BBC Two specials ==
=== One-off episodes ===
#	Title	Broadcast	Synopsis
1	Louis and the Brothel	9 November 2003	Ex-prostitute Susan Austin and her ex-client and now husband, Lance Gilman, run America's newest legal brothel – The Wild Horse Ranch in Reno, Nevada. In a three-week sojourn, Theroux gets to know the couple and meets their customers. He also hears the stories of the working women.
2	Louis, Martin & Michael	16 November 2003	
3	Louis and the Nazis	21 December 2003	Theroux travels to California to get to know some of the key personalities of the American neo-Nazi movement.
4	Louis Theroux: Gambling in Las Vegas	4 February 2007	
5	The Most Hated Family in America	1 April 2007	Theroux spends a week with the Westboro Baptist Church
6	Louis Theroux: Under the Knife	7 October 2007	In California, Theroux investigates extreme plastic surgery.
7	Louis Theroux: Behind Bars	13 January 2008	
8	African Hunting Holiday	6 April 2008	
9	Law and Disorder in Philadelphia	30 November 2008	
10	Law and Disorder in Johannesburg	7 December 2008	
11	A Place for Paedophiles	19 April 2009	
12	The City Addicted to Crystal Meth	9 August 2009	Theroux examines how drug addiction has torn apart the city of Fresno in Central Valley, California.
13	America's Medicated Kids	18 April 2010	Theroux visits several families to investigate and ascertain the use of psychiatric medication for children.
14	Law and Disorder in Lagos	10 October 2010	Theroux travels to Lagos and investigates crime in that city.
15	The Ultra Zionists	3 February 2011	Louis investigates illegal Israeli settler expansionism
16	America's Most Hated Family in Crisis	3 April 2011	Four years after his last visit, Theroux returns to spend a week with the Westboro Baptist Church in the wake of several defections from the church.
17	Miami Mega Jail Part 1	22 May 2011	Theroux spends time in one of the most notorious sections of Miami County Jail: the fifth and sixth floor of 'Main Jail', where many of the most volatile inmates are incarcerated.
18	Miami Mega Jail Part 2	29 May 2011	Theroux goes deeper into the jail system and meets an inmate facing a possible death sentence. He also follows a group of younger inmates who have escaped prison by pleading guilty and agreeing to attend a four-month military style boot camp.
19	America's Most Dangerous Pets	30 October 2011	
20	Extreme Love: Autism	19 April 2012	Theroux travels to one of the most innovative autism schools of its kind – the DLC Warren in New Jersey – opened in 2007 at a cost of $54 million. There he finds out how specialised intervention can help both the children and the families that care for them.
21	Extreme Love: Dementia	26 April 2012	
22	Twilight of the Porn Stars	10 June 2012	Fifteen years after documenting the world of male porn performers in Los Angeles, Theroux returns to find a business struggling with the deluge of free porn online.
23	By Reason of Insanity Part 1	22 March 2015	Theroux immerses himself in the world of Ohio's State Psychiatric Hospitals, meeting patients who have committed crimes - at times horrifically violent - while in the grip of severe mental illness.
24	By Reason of Insanity Part 2	29 March 2015	Theroux immerses himself in the world of Ohio's State Psychiatric Hospitals, meeting patients who have committed crimes - at times horrifically violent - while in the grip of severe mental illness.
25	Transgender Kids	5 April 2015	Theroux travels to a hospital in San Francisco to meet transgender children and their families, as they undergo life-changing treatment.
26	Drinking to Oblivion	24 April 2016	
27	A Different Brain	15 May 2016	
28	Savile	2 October 2016	Follow up of the crimes of Jimmy Savile, successor to When Louis Met Jimmy (2000). Based on the aftermath of Jimmy Savile sexual abuse scandal that came out after his death.
29	Talking to Anorexia	29 October 2017	
30	The Night in Question	4 March 2019	
31	Mothers on the Edge	12 May 2019	
32	Surviving America's Most Hated Family	14 July 2019	
33	Selling Sex	12 January 2020	
34	Shooting Joe Exotic	5 April 2021	
35	The Settlers	27 April 2025	14 years after his previous documentary in the region, The Ultra Zionists, Louis documents Zionist Israeli settlements in the West Bank, in light of the October 7 attacks in 2023. Steps towards settlements in the Gaza Strip from Daniella Weiss are also shown.

=== LA Stories ===
#	Title	Broadcast	Synopsis
1	LA Stories: City of Dogs	23 March 2014	
2	LA Stories: Edge of Life	30 March 2014	
3	LA Stories: Among the Sex Offenders	6 April 2014	

=== Dark States ===
#	Title	Broadcast	Synopsis
1	Heroin Town	8 October 2017	Louis embeds himself in an American community (Huntington, West Virginia) devastated by heroin abuse.
2	Sex Trafficking in Houston	15 October 2017	Investigating sex workers and their pimps, Theroux uncovers the dark underbelly of Houston, Texas.
3	Murder in Milwaukee	22 October 2017	Theroux spends time with the Milwaukee Police Department as they try to tackle the high rate of homicide and meets the residents affected by gun crime.

=== Altered States ===
#	Title	Broadcast	Synopsis
1	Love Without Limits	4 November 2018	Theroux travels to Portland, Oregon, to meet people engaging in polyamorous relationships.
2	Choosing Death	18 November 2018	An investigation into California and Oregon's right to die laws for terminally ill people and those who are in pain but are not terminally ill.
3	Take My Baby	25 November 2018	Theroux meets American women who cannot or will not keep their new-born baby and seek to find new parents from an adoption agency.

=== Life on the Edge ===
Life on the Edge is a series released during the social distancing restrictions due to the COVID-19 pandemic in the UK in 2020. It follows Theroux, in his home, discussing the content and making of many of his past documentaries, including Weird Weekends, interspersed with clips and interviews with participants.

#	Title	Broadcast	Synopsis
1	Beyond Belief	6 September 2020	
2	The Dark Side of Pleasure	13 September 2020	
3	Law and Disorder	20 September 2020	
4	Family Ties	27 September 2020	

=== Forbidden America ===
Forbidden America is a three-part series focusing on social media use in the United States among several groups, including the alt-right, rappers and pornographic film actors.

#	Title	Broadcast	Synopsis
1	Extreme and Online	13 February 2022	Theroux interviews Nick Fuentes and Baked Alaska.
2	Rap's New Frontline	20 February 2022	Louis interviews members of the trap rap community in Florida about the controversies and criminal records that the artists have accrued, including an interview with 9lokkNine, prior to his trial for attempted murder.
3	Porn's MeToo	27 February 2022	Louis interviews Los Angeles porn stars about changes in the industry following the rise of OnlyFans and the MeToo movement. Theroux talks with Bunny Colby, Mia Malkova, Pierre Woodman, Ginger Banks and Derek Hay.

=== Louis Theroux Interviews... ===
Louis Theroux interviews multiple of UK's most widely known celebrities in the way that he's most known for.

#	Title	Broadcast	Synopsis
1.1	Stormzy	25 October 2022	
1.2	Dame Judi Dench	1 November 2022	
1.3	Yungblud	8 November 2022	
1.4	Bear Grylls	15 November 2022	
1.5	Katherine Ryan	22 November 2022	
1.6	Rita Ora	29 November 2022	

#	Title	Broadcast	Synopsis
2.1	Anthony Joshua	7 November 2023	
2.2	Pete Doherty	14 November 2023	
2.3	Joan Collins	21 November 2023	
2.4	Raye	28 November 2023	
2.5	Chelsea Manning	5 December 2023	
2.6	Ashley Walters	12 December 2023	

== My Scientology Movie ==
A documentary film about Scientology in which Theroux teams up with former senior church official Mark Rathbun, the film takes an unconventional approach, after the Church of Scientology refused to cooperate in its making. It features actors "auditioning" for parts playing high-profile Scientologists in scenes recreating accounts from ex-members about incidents involving senior church management. Initially released on 7 October 2016 in the UK, and 3 March 2017 in the US.

== KSI: In Real Life ==
A documentary film about the life and career of musician, boxer and YouTuber KSI. The documentary was released on 26 January 2023.

== Can I Tell You a Secret? ==
In 2024, his production company Mindhouse produced a documentary on Netflix about a prolific cyberstalker titled Can I Tell You a Secret?

== Louis Theroux: Inside the Manosphere ==
Louis Theroux: Inside the Manosphere is a 2026 feature-length documentary film directed by Adrian Choa and presented by Louis Theroux. Released globally on Netflix on 11 March 2026, the project marks Theroux’s debut as a presenter for the streaming platform, following a decades-long career primarily associated with the BBC. The documentary explores the "manosphere," an online ecosystem of content creators advocating for hyper-masculinity, "red-pill" philosophy, and often controversial views on gender roles.

In the film, Theroux travels to Miami, New York, and Marbella to interview prominent and often polarised figures within the movement. Key subjects include:

- Harrison Sullivan (HSTikkyTokky): A British fitness influencer known for his "hustle" lifestyle and provocative social media presence.
- Myron Gaines: Host of the Fresh and Fit podcast, known for promoting "one-way monogamy" and traditionalist gender hierarchies.
- Nicolas Kenn De Balinthazy (Sneako): A streamer and content creator who transitioned from commentary to more radicalised political and "manosphere" content.
- Justin Waller and Ed Matthews: Other significant figures within the network who promote wealth acquisition and masculine dominance.
