= List of atheists (surnames T to Z) =

Atheists with surnames starting T, U, V, W, X, Y or Z, sortable by the field for which they are mainly known and nationality.

Name	Dates	Known as / for	Who	Reference
Eddie Tabash	–	Atheist activist	American lawyer, atheist activist and debater.	"It is long overdue for Atheistic arguments to be given a seat at the table of the marketplace of ideas in today's world. I have established this website in the hope of providing a platform for the dissemination of these arguments."
Matt Taibbi	1970–	Journalist	American journalist and political writer.	"Matt Taibbi, interviewed by 'Friendly Atheist' Hemant Mehta: "HM: What role should religion play in the political arena? MT: Well, I'm an atheist/agnostic, so I would say none. People should stick to solving the problems they have the tools to solve."
Raymond Tallis	1946–	Scientist	British gerontologist, philosopher, poet, novelist and cultural critic.	"He is a passionate atheist who hates materialistic interpretations of our minds."
Peter Tatchell	1952–	Activist	Australian born British human rights activist, who gained international notoriety for his attempted citizen's arrest of Zimbabwean President Robert Mugabe in 1999 and 2001, on charges of torture and other human rights abuses.	"They happily work with me, despite my atheism and gayness. This is the kind, gentle face of Islam that never seems to be newsworthy."
Savielly Tartakower	1887–1956	Sportsperson	Polish/French chess Grandmaster.	"Practically all chess-players are born optimists ... Those who believe in God count on divine help; the agnostics know that somehow or other it will turn out all right; whilst the atheists, who are of course the most superstitious, believe in luck. If this last statement seems a trifle high pitched then let me submit as evidence the case of Dr. Tartakower. An atheist if ever there was one, he fervently believed in luck, touched wood at appropriate moments and never, never walked under ladders."
Jeffrey Tayler	–	Journalist	American born author and journalist resident in Russia since 1993.	"But despite his own atheism and his distaste at his companion's relentless evangelising, he comes to understand the appeal of religion to desert dwellers. "Nowhere for me had words Qur'anic or biblical taken on as much life as they had here in the Sahara, where, apart from the Word, there was nothing but rock, sky and sun."
Laurie Taylor	1936–	Social scientist	British sociologist and radio presenter.	"He was educated at St Mary's College, Liverpool until the Christian Brothers who ran it cast him out like Lucifer, for what he judges to be his "general atheism". He started work in a mail-order warehouse. "Then I realised I needed a proper career."
Paul Taylor	1930–2018	Choreographer	American choreographer.	"Two works created during the last year complete the bill. In the Beginning is a joke that doesn't come off. The story, filtered through Taylor's profound atheism, is that of the book of Genesis."
Teller	1948–	Illusionist	American illusionist, comedian and writer best known as the silent half of the comedy magic duo known as Penn & Teller, along with Penn Jillette.	"Never shy about their [Penn and Teller] atheism (Penn's got the Nevada license plates ATHEIST and GODLESS), the two have been raising their voices – even the oft-silent Teller – to decry the muddying line between church and state. 'Atheists are saying, 'All right, we've had enough,'" Teller says."
Vladimir Tendryakov	1923–1984	Author	Russian short story writer and novelist.	Commenting on Tendryakov's obituary in the Times, Professor Geoffrey A. Hosking wrote: "Perhaps because of his concern for the human personality, Tendryakov was the first writer in the post-Stalin period to raise religious questions seriously in fiction. Though an atheist himself, he understood the intrinsic importance of religion, and did not treat it merely satirically or condescendingly."
Tiffany Thayer	1902–1959	Author and actor	American actor, author and founder of the Fortean Society.	"Characterizing himself as an atheist, an anarchist, and a skeptic, he enjoyed his image of impudent prurience, though he revealed little to the public of his personal life."
Theodorus	–	Philosopher	Greek philosopher of the Cyrenaic school who taught that the goal of life was to obtain joy and avoid grief.	"Theodorus, the atheistic philosopher of Cyrene, appears in Athens during the Phalerean regime."
Louis Theroux	1970-	British documentary filmmaker and broadcaster	He is best known for his documentary series, including Louis Theroux's Weird Weekends, When Louis Met..., and his BBC Two specials.	Whilst filming for his BBC show America's Most Hated Family in Crisis, he was asked, "Why...pose a difference between religion and ethics?" He responded, "Because I don't believe in God". In his documentary "The Ultra Zionists", he confirms that he is an atheist.
Mandisa Thomas	unknown; living	Activist	Founder and president of Black Nonbelievers Inc, which she founded in 2011	"I am atheist -- and I am black."
Mark Thomas	1963–	Comedian	British (English) comedian, presenter, political activist and reporter	"I've been an atheist since the age of eight. A visiting pastor at church performed a magic trick that ended with him tapping a chalice and it filling with coins. I asked him how he did it and he said, 'All you need is faith,' When I got home I rushed down to the cellar and found an old Half Corona tin and a stick from my dad's wood box (he was a self-employed builder). I sat there for an hour and left an atheist."
Richard Thomas	1964–	Musician	British musician, writer, and comedy actor, best known for composing and scoring the award-winning Jerry Springer - The Opera.	"Thomas flatly denies the work is being shocking for its own sake. The gay, atheist fan of Judge Judy and Wife Swap is pleasant, polite and 44..."
Bill Thompson	1960–	Journalist	British (English) technology writer, best known for his weekly column in the Technology section of BBC News Online and his appearances on Digital Planet, a radio show on the BBC World Service.	"Facebook knows I'm an atheist, and if Facebook knows it then the CIA probably knows it too, which could be a problem if I tried to stand for election in South Carolina, Mississippi or any of the other seven US States which require candidates to believe in a supreme being."
Emma Thompson	1959–	Actor	English Academy Award-, Emmy Award-, BAFTA Award- and Golden Globe-winning actress, comedian, and screenwriter.	"Thompson is equally vociferous on matters of faith...."I'm an atheist; I suppose you can call me a sort of libertarian anarchist. I regard religion with fear and suspicion. It's not enough to say that I don't believe in God. I actually regard the system as distressing: I am offended by some of the things said in the Bible and the Koran, and I refute them." She knows she's being controversial, but she believes passionately in what she says, and passionately believes it needs saying. "I think that the Bible as a system of moral guidance in the 21st century is insufficient, to put it mildly," she continues, frowning a little. "I feel quite strongly that we need a new moral lodestone if we can't rely on what is inside our own selves. Which I think, actually, is pretty reliable."
William Thompson	1775–1833	Philosopher	Irish political and philosophical writer and social reformer, developing from utilitarianism into an early critic of capitalist exploitation whose ideas influenced the Cooperative, Trade Union and Chartist movements as well as Karl Marx.	"Such actions established among the Catholic population of the area a long-lived reputation for kindness and fair dealing which persisted despite his professed atheism."
James Thomson	1834–1882	Author	British (Scottish) Victorian-era poet famous primarily for the long poem The City of Dreadful Night.	"His beliefs moved from pantheism to an atheism which causes less of a frisson now than it did in his own day, and his apocalyptic vision of the megalopolis in 'The City of Dreadful Night' continues to have resonance."
Tracey Thorn	1962–	Musician	British (English) pop singer and songwriter. She is best known as being one half of the duo Everything but the Girl.	"I've always been an atheist. We grew up in a village and I was like 'I'm not joining the Christian Youth Club'. Believing something that's unprovable is not how my mind works."
Xi Jinping	1953–	Politician	Chinese political leader, the 6th paramount leader of China	"Xi Jinping, an atheist and hard-line communist..."
Xuan Thuy	1912–1985	Politician	Vietnamese political figure, foreign minister for North Vietnam 1963–65, official leader of the delegation to the secret talks with Henry Kissinger, and the main negotiator at the earliest meetings with Kissinger.	"It has just been revealed that Thuy used to earn a living as a sorcerer [...] he travelled around the country selling magical charms, spells and cures, and spreading Communist propaganda at the same time. This information was volunteered by a Vietcong colonel who recently came over to the South Vietnam Government side. He said they Thuy, being an atheist, clearly did not believe in his own magical powers, but had used sorcery purely as a cover for his political work."
Pat Tillman	1976–2004	Athlete, U.S. Army Ranger	American football player, died in combat in Afghanistan in 2004, subject of the documentary The Tillman Story	Tillman's purported last words were uttered to a fellow soldier who was praying aloud, "Would you shut your (expletive) mouth?" yelled Tillman. "God's not going to help you. You need to do something for yourself, you sniveling..." Various news reports after his death attest to his atheism.
Frank J. Tipler	1947–	Scientist	American mathematical physicist and professor at Tulane University.	Although an atheist, Tipler believes 'God' will eventually exist in the last moments of the universe: "The theory is basically this: just as the Earth began with a Big Bang, so it will end, in a single point, which Tipler calls the Omega Point. And just as life on Earth began with a single cell which colonised the planet, so life at the end of time will, according to Tipler, "become omnipresent, omnipotent, and omniscient which are the three attributes of God". The Omega Point/God is the point of ultimate, infinite knowledge when the earth will be inhabited by beings who are, to all intents and purposes, computers. Tipler says they can be called beings because he defines life as information processing, as did the famous biologist Richard Dawkins, who called computers "biological objects". [...] Tipler says his own viewpoint is that of an atheist. Though brought up a Christian fundamentalist, he rejected religion when he was 16, because the Church claimed the Earth was 6,000 years old, when he knew that it went back 4.6 billion years. [...] Still, it seems excessively generous for the beings of the future to want to resurrect all of us. Tipler answers that they will be extremely intelligent beings, and therefore extremely curious, interested in all the variations that preceded them, from the very beginning, just as today's scientists are working to recreate the first single cell, in all its possible forms. "I think the evidence is very strong that this particular version of you and this particular version of me will actually be there in the future. It will be you and me emulated down to the atom." Why, he says, we might even end up repeating the whole interview." Megan Tressider, 'The Megan Tressider Interview: Meaning of life is, er, God and Omega; Physicist Frank J Tipler, an atheist, says he has found God',
Michael Tippett	1905–1998	Musician	British (English) composer.	"He then went as a boarder to Stamford grammar school, Lincolnshire, where he was much happier, though still a notorious character largely on account of his now fully developed atheism. [...] He was cremated on 15 January at Hanworth crematorium, at an explicitly non-religious service."
Gherman Titov	1935–2000	Astronaut	Russian/Soviet cosmonaut and the second human to orbit the Earth.	"Some say God is living there [in space]. I was looking around very attentively, but I did not see anyone there. I did not detect either angels or gods. ... I don't believe in God. I believe in man-his strength, his possibilities, his reason."
Palmiro Togliatti	1893–1964	Politician	Italian politician, the leader of Italian Communist Party from 1927 to his death in 1964.	"Churches along the route were closed. It was said at the Vatican that this could be seen as a silent protest against an atheist's funeral on such a scale in the heart of Christian Rome."
Nicholas Tomalin	1931–1973	Journalist	British journalist and writer.	"B.B.C. 2 (Ch. 33) [...] 10.20 Doubts and Certainties: a Dean talks to an atheist, with Harry Williams, Nicholas Tomalin."
Miguel Torga	1907–1995	Author	Portuguese author of poetry, short stories, theatre and a 16 volume diary, one of the greatest Portuguese writers of the 20th century.	"His education in Jesuit seminaries made of him a lifelong atheist, though he sometimes used the less sadistic imagery of Christianity."
Linus Torvalds	1969–	Software engineer	Finnish software engineer, creator of the Linux kernel.	"[I am] completely a-religious—atheist. I find that people seem to think religion brings morals and appreciation of nature. I actually think it detracts from both."
Sue Townsend	1946–2014	Author	British novelist, best known as the author of the Adrian Mole series of books.	"A republican, atheist and socialist, she is married, has four children and five grandchildren, and lives in Leicester."
Polly Toynbee	1946–	Atheist activist	British journalist, columnist for The Guardian.	Even an old atheist like me sees no good in this ignorance of basic Christian myths
William Trenwith	1846–1925	Politician	Australian trade union official and labour movement politician.	"In 1886–89 Trenwith prepared for parliament in a dozen lesser forums, assuming executive positions on the Workingman's Club, the Democratic Society, the Sunday Liberation Society and the Secularist Society. Despite his avowed atheism, he edged his way into respectable circles. In 1886, he was appointed a commissioner on the Adelaide Jubilee Exhibition in 1887 and took a similar post on Melbourne's International Exhibition of 1888. He also sat on the provisional committee of the Working Men's College."
Leon Trotsky	1879–1940	Politician	Russian Marxist theorist.	"I shall die a proletarian revolutionist, a Marxist, a dialectical materialist, and, consequently, an irreconcilable atheist."
Fernando Trueba	1955–	Film director	Spanish book editor, screenwriter and film director.	Trueba said in his acceptance speech for the 1993 Best Non-English Speaking Film Oscar "I'd like to thank God, but I don't believe in God, I just believe in Billy Wilder..."
Alan Turing	1912–1954	Scientist	British (English) mathematician, logician, and cryptographer; often considered to be the father of modern computer science. The Turing Award, often recognized as the "Nobel Prize of computing", is named after him.	"This loss shattered Turing's religious faith and led him into atheism..."
Matthew Turner	17??–1788?	Scientist	British (English) chemist, surgeon, teacher and radical theologian, author of the first published work of avowed atheism in Britain (1782).	"In religion he was raised as a theist, but in 1782, in an Answer to Dr. Priestley, on the Existence of God, a response to Priestley's Letters to a Philosophical Unbeliever, he described himself as a freethinker (p. 5). This work, first published under the pseudonym William Hammon, was subsequently republished by Richard Carlile in 1826. In the pamphlet Turner declared that he was an atheist, though he did admit that the 'vis naturae', gravity, and matter's elasticity and repulsive powers demonstrated that the universe was permeated by 'a principle of intelligence and design' (ibid., 17). Despite the 'perpetual industry' of nature, he denied that this intelligence entailed that philosophers needed to posit the existence of a deity extraneous to the material world."
Wendy Turner Webster	1967–	Television presenter	English TV presenter, animal rights campaigner and journalist.	"I've never believed in God, but I did enjoy the theatrical side so I was always keen to be in Mum's little plays."
Kenneth Tynan	1927–1980	Journalist	British theatre critic and writer who was very influential and often controversial.	"A lifelong atheist, he needed a belief, a philosophy, a cause," noted his first wife".
Jerzy Urban	1933–2022	Journalist	Polish journalist, commentator, writer and politician, editor-in-chief of the weekly Nie and owner of the company which owns it, Urma.	"As a godless atheist I never cared much for the church or the papacy. I disliked the fact that the papacy bore down so heavily on Poland."
Brendon Urie	1987–	Musician	American singer, songwriter, musician and multi-instrumentalist. He is best known as the lead vocalist of Panic! at the Disco.	"If God were real and he had created me, he would've said, 'Give him some big lips and a wide nose. But make him white. And atheist.'"
Freda Utley	1898–1978	Author	British (English) scholar, best-selling author and political activist.	"Her parents were radicals in their outlook and they educated their daughter in a rationalist and humanist mode. As an atheist she saw religion only as the shield of tyranny, intolerance, and cruelty."
Ram Gopal Varma	1962–	Film director	Indian film director, writer and film producer.	"If Jaya Bachchan is in the film, I will go to hell. But then I am an atheist, and do not believe in god."
Wynford Vaughan-Thomas	1908–1987	Journalist	British (Welsh) newspaper journalist and radio and television broadcaster with a lengthy career.	Mr Vaughan-Thomas says he is the only Welshman brought up as a trained atheist: "I am totally irreligious, but I can understand why religious people are concerned about the disintegration of Christian ethics. [...] I am a sympathetic atheist and I go to services from time to time and enjoy the great sense of history."
Jesse Ventura	1951–	Wrestler, politician and actor	Former wrestler, former Minnesota governor, and actor.	Ventura, who was previously a Lutheran but declared in a 1999 interview that religion "is a sham and a crutch for weak-minded people", never specifically claimed to be an atheist until 2011, when he declared that he does not believe in God. Ventura said, "I've now admitted I'm an atheist" and went on to say, "In the United States, there's some prevailing feeling out there that because you don't believe in the Tooth Fairy, Santa Claus, the Easter Bunny, or God, this being you can never see -- it exists only in your mind -- that somehow you don't have values."
Paul Verhoeven	1938–	Film director	Dutch BAFTA Award nominated film director, screenwriter, and film producer, filming in both the Netherlands and the United States, best known for the American feature films RoboCop, Total Recall, Basic Instinct and Starship Troopers and Dutch films Black Book and Soldier of Orange.	"But then, this auteur has no hauteur; nor, more importantly, is he Jewish. Rather, he is an atheist who had a bout of Pentacostalist [sic] fervour in his mid-20s that still inflects his work and thinking: he still reads widely about Christian history; he considers RoboCop to be a Christ-like story of resurrection."
Frances Vernon	1963–1991	Author	British novelist.	"She was educated partly at Cranborne Chase, a free-thinking school where there was no religious education, and was a committed atheist."
Pierre Vidal-Naquet	1930–2006	Historian	French classical historian.	"In 1950 Vidal-Naquet declared to his future wife Genevive Railhac that "as an atheist, history is for me the only possible substitute for religion"."
Paolo Villaggio	1932–2017	Actor	Italian actor, writer, director and comedian, especially famous for his grotesque irony and satire, who often worked with Federico Fellini.	"I am an atheist but I am sure a divine zone exists, where certain special machines like Fellini work."
Kurt Vonnegut	1922–2007	Author	American author, writer of Cat's Cradle, among other books.	"I am an atheist (or at best a Unitarian who winds up in churches quite a lot)."
Frederick Vosper	1869–1901	Politician	Australian newspaper journalist and proprietor, and politician, known for his ardent views and support of Australian republicanism, federalism and trade unionism.	"A professed atheist, he fought for causes such as republicanism, political separation for the goldfields and miners' safety; he also opposed Asian immigration."
Sarah Vowell	1969–	Author	American author, journalist, humorist, and commentator.	When asked if there is a God, Vowell answered "Absolutely not."
Ethel Lilian Voynich	1864–1960	Author	British novelist and musician, born in Ireland and a supporter of several revolutionary causes.	"She returned to England an atheist and radical, eager to view nihilism in Russia."
Nicolas Walter	1934–2000	Atheist activist	British anarchist and atheist writer, speaker and activist.	"Mr Walter is a third-generation atheist, very proud that his grandparents, on both sides, shrugged off various forms of Protestantism. His father was W Grey Walter, the eminent neurologist, who often appeared on The Brains Trust. "He was a left-wing humanist and believed that science could solve everything."
W. Grey Walter	1910–1977	Scientist	American neurophysiologist famous for his work on brain waves, and robotician.	"A firm atheist, he was interested in, though unconvinced by, the paranormal, and also did research on hypnosis."
Lalla Ward	1951–	Actress	British (English) actress and illustrator, best known for playing Romana in Doctor Who; she is the ex-wife of evolutionary biologist Richard Dawkins.	Having married Richard Dawkins in 1992, Ward contributed an 'in the same spirit' footnote to Dawkins's The God Delusion, and jointly read that book with Dawkins for the audiobook version.
Roger Waters	1943–	Musician	British (English) rock musician; singer, bassist, guitarist, songwriter and composer, best known for his career with Pink Floyd.	"Please, God – I'm an atheist so maybe I shouldn't be asking God – but let Barack Obama finally win the Democratic nomination and elect a person who seems to be not just enormously intelligent but also deeply humane and seems to have an imagination."
James D. Watson	1928–2025	Scientist	American 1962–Nobel-laureate co-discover of the structure of DNA.	When asked by a student if he believed in God, Watson replied "Oh, no. Absolutely not... The biggest advantage to believing in God is you don't have to understand anything, no physics, no biology. I wanted to understand."
Steven Weinberg	1933–2021	Scientist	American theoretical physicist. He won the Nobel Prize in Physics in 1979 for the unification of electromagnetism and the weak force into the electroweak force.	Azpurua: "Would it be accurate to say that you are an atheist?" Weinberg: "Yes. I don't believe in God, but I don't make a religion out of not believing in God. I don't organize my life around that."
Gene Weingarten	1951–	Journalist	American humor writer for The Washington Post.	"I am a devout atheist but can't explain why the moon is exactly the right size, and gets positioned so precisely between the Earth and the sun, that total solar eclipses are perfect. It bothers me."
Victor Frederick Weisskopf	1908–2002	Scientist	Austrian-American theoretical physicist, co-founder and board member of the Union of Concerned Scientists.	"...Victor Weisskopf, who describes himself as an atheist Viennese Jew...."
Pete Wernick	1946-	Musician	American bluegrass banjo player and songwriter.	
Bengt Westerberg	1943–	Politician	Swedish politician, leader of the Liberal People's Party from 1983 to 1995. Minister for Social Affairs and Deputy Prime Minister from 1991 to 1994. Currently holds office as the Deputy President of the International Federation of Red Cross and Red Crescent Societies in Geneva, Switzerland.	Translation: Interviewer: I would like to ask you about your relation to religion and atheistic humanism. When did you "come out" as [an] atheist and how did it happen? Westerberg: If you mean in public, then I revealed it in connection to my candidacy as party leader for the People's Party. I got the question if I believed in God from Thomas Hempel in Radioekot (radio program) and answered no. That's when it became known, though I've never made any secret about it.
Kurt Westergaard	1935–2021	Cartoonist	Danish cartoonist, creator of a controversial cartoon of the Muslim prophet Muhammad wearing a bomb as a turban which was part of the Jyllands-Posten Muhammad cartoons controversy.	Interviewed by the New York Times on 20 March 2008, Westergaard said: "I have always been an atheist, and I dare say these events have only intensified my atheism."
Jerry Wexler	1917–2008	Journalist	American music journalist and producer, regarded as one of the major record industry players behind music from the 1950s through the 1980s, coiner of the term "rhythm and blues."	"The music business held a curious appeal to a man who had hitherto dreamed only of becoming the Jewish John O'Hara – and whose fiction had been published in Story magazine. It was dominated by Jews, and therefore excluded from Wasp high culture. "I was determined to use all my wit and courage to confound the Christian tormenters," Wexler says, referring to the "immanent anti-Semitism that existed then and exists now. It's like Dr John says, 'I don't want no one hangin' no jacket on me'." He is, in fact, a confirmed atheist of many years' standing."
Joss Whedon	1964–	Screenwriter	American screenwriter and director, most famous for creating the Buffy the Vampire Slayer franchise.	Asked if there was a God, Whedon answered, "No."
Francis Wheen	1957–	Journalist	British journalist, writer and broadcaster.	"[...] I'm an admirer of what you might call 'Enlightenment values' (though they go way beyond the Enlightenment). Things like scientific empiricism, the separation of church and state, the waning of absolutism and tyranny, yes, I cling to those. [...] It [his childhood home] was quite a religious household. I wouldn't be surprised, frankly, if I'm the first Wheen to be an atheist. And so, of course, there was a lot of church-going and all the rest of it, and gradually, through my childhood, I found myself rejecting more and more of it, until finally all I was left with was the Litany and the hymns. I know the Book of Common Prayer and Hymns Ancient and Modern and the King James Bible practically backwards, and I'm very fond of them all."
Edmund White	1940–	Author	American novelist, short-story writer and critic.	"If I were a believer, perhaps I'd have some answers. As an atheist, I can't even imagine that I was spared so that I wouldn't die a fool or a sinner. Of course the values we're left with are all the residue of Christianity, though shorn of system and stripped of finality. An atheist lives in the present, since there will be no eternity ('They were shut up in days,' John McGahern says with strangely beautiful concision in Amongst Women.) Perhaps that's why I was given so much of the present to work with, since it's all I'll be getting."
Peter White	1947–	Broadcaster	British (English) broadcast journalist and DJ; blind since birth, he is closely associated with disability issues.	"In the 60s Tom Lehrer introduced me to the idea that you can be totally irreverent about anything. I realised nothing was sacred. I don't like authority. My atheism is very genuine. If God does exist, I don't think he's a very nice bloke."
Phillip Whitehead	1937–2005	Politician	British Labour politician, television producer and writer.	"It was entirely right that Phillip Whitehead, who loved the village and had lived there since he was three, should have left it in the way that Rowsley men and women have left it for 200 years and more. It was an English funeral in an English village according to the rites of the Church of England. But it is at least a paradox that a man who was an uncompromising atheist – and so described by one of his sons during the service – should be laid to rest with the promise of resurrection and eternal life."
Peter Wilby	1944–	Journalist	British journalist, former editor of The Independent on Sunday and New Statesman.	"These are powerful arguments. But as a practising atheist (as I like to call myself), I cannot accept them. I fear community pressures will force parents to use all-Muslim schools, when they would prefer not to do so; that Muslims who go to non-faith schools will be left more isolated; that the mosque's hold on Muslim areas will be strengthened; and that government support will legitimise what would amount to ethnic segregation."
Earl Wild	1915–2010	Musician	American classical pianist, considered a leading virtuoso of his generation.	"He is against pianists who express concentration by leaning their heads back with their eyes closed: "When you give a recital, God doesn't help you." (Wild claims to be an atheist largely for musical reasons, having at age ten asked his mother how there could be a God when the organist at their local church in Pittsburgh was so lousy.)"
Gene Wilder	1933–2016	Actor	American actor best known for his role as Willy Wonka.	"Well, I'm a Jewish-Buddhist-Atheist, I guess."
Bernard Williams	1929–2003	Philosopher	British philosopher, widely cited as the most important British moral philosopher of his time.	"While Shirley was (and is) a devout Catholic and so took the marriage as a commitment for eternity, Bernard, an atheist, had not done so when he made the wedding vows. Shirley says: "The Church and Bernard had a wonderful time debating all this. The theologians were so thrilled to be discussing it with a leading philosopher."
Robyn Williams	1944–	Journalist	Australian science journalist and broadcaster, interviewer and host of the Science Show on the Australian Broadcasting Corporation.	In his 2006 book Unintelligent Design: Why God isn't as smart as she thinks she is, Williams states: "Atheists like me don't think about God at all—unless provoked. We think about everything else that life's rich burden thrusts upon us. But God doesn't arise."
Sean Williams	1967–	Author	Australian science fiction author, a multiple recipient of both the Ditmar and Aurealis Awards.	"Creation myths tap into the same kind of issues as post-human SF, albeit sometimes turned upside-down: "Where are we going?" instead of "Where did we come from?" "What does it mean to be human or to play god?" I find these kind of questions perpetually interesting, so will probably keep coming back to them forever. The solo space opera books are certainly tapping into the same vein, perhaps more overtly than ever. This is what comes of being an atheist, perhaps: we think about these things more than most people. Obsess about them, probably."
Ted Willis	1914–1992	Television dramatist	British television dramatist, also politically active in support of the Labour Party.	"LORD WILLIS (Lab.) said that although an atheist or humanist, he was not opposed to the teaching of religion in schools. What he objected to was the way in which it was presented. Except in rare instances, children were not taught about religion but about one religion and in a one-sided untruthful, dogmatic and prejudiced way."
David Sloan Wilson	1949–	Scientist	American evolutionary biologist, son of Sloan Wilson, proponent of multilevel selection theory and author of several popular books on evolution.	I don't believe in God. I tell people I'm an atheist, but a nice atheist.
Simon Winchester	1944–	Author	British author and journalist.	"An interview with author Simon Winchester is presented. He states that the book "Science and Civilization," by Joseph Needham is focused on every issues linked to China's relationship with water. Winchester admits that he is an atheist in a nonpolemical way."
Sherwin Wine	1928–2007	Philosopher	American founder of the non-theistic Society for Humanistic Judaism, who has also called himself an "ignostic".	" To the consternation and dismay of his fellow Reform rabbis, Wine publicly declares, "I am an atheist," and has expunged the name of God from all services at his temple. Wine is a rather special sort of atheist. Technically, he calls himself an "ignostic", which Wine defines as someone who will only accept the truth of statements that can be empirically proved. "I find no adequate reason to accept the existence of a supreme person," he insists[,] although he is willing to change his mind if new evidence appears. "
Terry Wogan	1938–2016	Television and radio broadcaster	Irish radio and television broadcaster, working for the BBC for most of his career; a leading media personality in Ireland and the UK since the late 1960s, and is often referred to as a "national treasure" of both the United Kingdom and his native Ireland.	"Broadcaster Terry Wogan has spoken of the grief of losing his first daughter – and revealed that he has never believed in God. [...] He revealed how – despite a very Catholic upbringing in Ireland – he is actually an atheist. 'I'm afraid I don't believe in God,' he said. 'My mother was devout and so is my wife. But I have the intellectual arrogance that makes it very hard to believe in him. I don't have the gift of faith. I remember at school I used to make up sins at confession – what we were told were sins by priests were not sins at all.'"
Alan Wolfe	1942–	Political scientist	American political scientist and sociologist, director of the Boisi Center for Religion and American Public Life.	"Wolfe, a self-proclaimed atheist, said he recognizes the importance of being open to religious ideas."
Tom Wolfe	1930–2018	Author	American author and member of 'New Journalism' school.	
Lewis Wolpert	1929–2021	Scientist	British developmental biologist, author, and broadcaster.	"I grew up in a Jewish family but I gave it all up at 16 when I prayed to God for something I really wanted and it didn't happen. I have been an atheist ever since. I believe in proof and I know of no evidence for the existence of God, but I am in no way hostile to religion provided it does not interfere in the lives of others or come into conflict with science."
Keith Porteous Wood	1948–	Atheist activist	British (English) Executive Director, formerly General Secretary, of the National Secular Society in the United Kingdom.	"I have been an atheist all my life and I have been the executive director of the National Secular Society for six years."
Leonard Woolf	1880–1969	Author	British political theorist, author, publisher, and civil servant, husband of author Virginia Woolf.	"He was brought up in Reform Judaism, became an atheist in his teens, and remained sceptical about the religious temperament."
Bob Woolmer	1948–2007	Sportsperson	British (English international) cricketer, professional cricket coach and commentator, playing in 19 Test matches and 6 One Day Internationals for England and later coaching South Africa, Warwickshire and Pakistan.	"Woolmer's relationship with his team was under increasing strain from religious disputes. The coach was frequently questioned by his captain, Inzamam, over his atheism. They had many anguished discussions about belief."
Steve Wozniak	1950–	Computer engineer	American co-founder of Apple Computer and inventor of the Apple I and Apple II.	I am also atheist or agnostic (I don't even know the difference). I've never been to church and prefer to think for myself. I do believe that religions stand for good things, and that if you make irrational sacrifices for a religion, then everyone can tell that your religion is important to you and can trust that your most important inner faiths are strong.
Elizur Wright	1804–1885	Scientist	American mathematician and abolitionist, sometimes described as the "father of life insurance" in the United States.	In Abolitionist, Actuary, Atheist: Elizur Wright and the Reform Impulse, Wright's biographer Lawrence B. Goodheart describes him as "an evangelical atheist, an impassioned actuary, a liberal who advocated state regulation, an individualist who championed social cooperation, and a very private public crusader"
Will Wright	1960–	Technology	American computer game designer and co-founder of the game development company Maxis, known for the 2008 game Spore	"When Wright was nine his father died of leukaemia and he moved with his mother and younger sister to Baton Rouge, Louisiana. There he enrolled in the Episcopal High School and duly became an atheist."
Will Wyatt	1942–	Television producer	British media consultant and company director, formerly a journalist, television producer and senior executive at the BBC.	"Mr Wyatt, an atheist, said that he had no axe to grind, and was struck by how much more different – "and accurate" – the BBC's description of Christianity was, where the birth of Jesus was mentioned as being "believed by Christians" and that Jesus "claimed" that he spoke with the authority of God."
Eliezer Yudkowsky	1979–	Artificial Intelligence researcher	American artificial intelligence researcher concerned with the Singularity, and an advocate of Friendly Artificial Intelligence.	"When I heard on the phone that Yehuda had died, there was never a moment of disbelief. I knew what kind of universe I lived in. How is my religious family to comprehend it, working, as they must, from the assumption that Yehuda was murdered by a benevolent God? The same loving God, I presume, who arranges for millions of children to grow up illiterate and starving; the same kindly tribal father-figure who arranged the Holocaust and the Inquisition's torture of witches. I would not hesitate to call it evil, if any sentient mind had committed such an act, permitted such a thing. But I have weighed the evidence as best I can, and I do not believe the universe to be evil, a reply which in these days is called atheism."
Mao Zedong	1893–1976	Politician	Chinese military and political leader, who led the Chinese Communist Party to victory in the Chinese Civil War, and was the leader of the People's Republic of China from its establishment in 1949 until his death in 1976. Under his leadership, China officially became an atheist state.	"Mao is not only a historical figure, of course, but is part of the (tattered) web of legitimacy on which the People's Republic rests. He is part of the founding mythology of the Chinese government, the Romulus and Remus of "People's China," and that's why his portrait hangs in Tiananmen Square. Even among ordinary Chinese, Mao retains a hold on the popular imagination, and some peasants in different parts of China have started traditional religious shrines honoring him. That's the ultimate honor for an atheist - he has become a god."
Slavoj Žižek	1949–	Philosopher	Slovenian sociologist, postmodern philosopher, and cultural critic.	"I am a fighting atheist."
Emile Zuckerkandl	1922–2013	Biologist	Austrian-American biologist considered one of the founders of the field of molecular evolution. He is best known for introducing, with Linus Pauling, the concept of the molecular clock, which set the stage for the neutral theory of molecular evolution.	"God brought evil-doing into the world when he devised animals that feed on other animals. The horrific pain that living beings inflict upon other living beings is part of a world created by a "good" God? Good God! Observations made at the level of the informational macromolecules and their interactions do not suggest that living systems have been built up thanks to the insights and decisions of a master engineer. Why would God tinker? Doesn't He know in advance the biological pathways that work? Isn't a tinkering God one who loudly says "I am not"? And why would He say so if He existed? [...] A direct implication of intelligent design, is that it could only have been carried out by a God. A standard response ... when hard-pressed, they proclaim that it is all a mystery. Existence already was a mystery, before people of faith further deepened it, and solving a mystery with a mystery is no solution."
