= Law and Disorder =

Law and Disorder may refer to:

- Law and Disorder (1940 film), a British crime comedy starring Barry K. Barnes
- Law and Disorder (1958 film), a British comedy starring Michael Redgrave
- Law and Disorder (1974 film), an American comedy starring Carroll O'Connor
- Law and Disorder (TV series), a 1994 British sitcom
- Law and Disorder (radio program), an American legal-issues talk program
- "Law and Disorder" (Auf Wiedersehen, Pet), a 1986 television episode
- "Law & Disorder", a 1995 episode of Homicide: Life on the Street
- "Law and Disorder" (Johnny Bravo), a 1999 television episode

== See also ==
- A series of documentary films by Louis Theroux:
  - Law and Disorder in Johannesburg
  - Law and Disorder in Lagos
  - Law and Disorder in Philadelphia
