= When Louis Met... =

- Title card from "When Louis Met... Keith Harris and Orville in Panto"
- Starring: Louis Theroux
- Country of origin: United Kingdom
- No. of series: 2
- No. of episodes: 8

Production
- Executive producers: David Mortimer; Kevin Sutcliffe
- Running time: 60 minutes

Original release
- Network: BBC Two
- Release: 13 April 2000 – 26 March 2002

When Louis Met... is a series of documentary films by Louis Theroux. The series was originally broadcast on BBC Two from 2000 to 2002. In the series, Theroux accompanied a different British celebrity in each programme as they went about their day-to-day business, interviewing them about their lives and experiences as he did so.

Theroux's episode about Jimmy Savile (When Louis Met Jimmy) was voted one of the top 50 documentaries of all time in a survey by Channel 4. In another episode (When Louis Met the Hamiltons), the Conservative MP Neil Hamilton and his wife Christine, were arrested during the course of filming following allegations of indecent assault; these were subsequently found to be false. The show did not return for a third series, and Theroux said that he had difficulty in finding people to appear.

== Episodes ==
=== Series overview ===
Series	Episodes	Originally released	
Series	Episodes	First released	Last released
1	3	13 April 2000	11 December 2001
2	5	5 March 2002	26 March 2002

=== Series 1 (2000–01) ===
No. overall	No. in series	Title	Directed by	Original release date
1	1	"When Louis Met Jimmy"	Will Yapp	13 April 2000
Louis visits his childhood hero, 73-year-old Jimmy Savile, a TV and radio personality, at his homes in Leeds, Scarborough and Glencoe. Louis raises the rumours of paedophilia (which only became more widely known after Savile's death), which Savile denies.
2	2	"When Louis Met Paul and Debbie"	Will Yapp	20 February 2001
Louis joins Paul Daniels and Debbie McGee in their home beside the River Thames and on the road as the magician appears on Celebrity Ready Steady Cook and his wife launches a ballet company.
3	3	"When Louis Met the Hamiltons"	Will Yapp	11 December 2001
Louis follows the (by then) former Conservative MP Neil Hamilton, and his wife Christine Hamilton, as they try to make a living as "objects of curiosity". The film features Louis on the sofa with a tipsy Christine, and follows the pair when they are arrested over an alleged sexual scandal (both were later cleared).

=== Series 2 (2002) ===
No. overall	No. in series	Title	Directed by	Original release date
4	1	"When Louis Met Ann Widdecombe"	Kate Townsend	5 March 2002
A prickly encounter with the Conservative politician in which Louis upsets her by asking about her possibly non-existent sex life and hears about her love of poetry and cats.
5	2	"When Louis Met Chris Eubank"	Alicia Kerr	12 March 2002
Louis joins the ex-boxer at home, in the ring and on a trip to buy jodhpurs. Eubank attempts a tongue twister and pontificates on being a role model for children.
6	3	"When Louis Met Keith Harris and Orville in Panto"	Guy Gilbert	19 March 2002
Louis meets the ventriloquist who no longer enjoys the TV light entertainment limelight (and can't hide his bitterness about that) but is still earning a good living. He has a flashy car, an ex-model wife, a large home and a role in Crewe's pantomime.
7	4	"When Louis Met Max Clifford"	Alicia Kerr	26 March 2002
Louis meets the PR guru/media manipulator as he handles Pop Idol judge Simon Cowell and child star Declan Galbraith and organises a charity do involving Westlife.
8	5	"Living with Louis"	Will Yapp	26 March 2002
Produced exclusively for pay TV channel UK Horizons. The participants of the previous programmes (with the exception of Ann Widdecombe and Max Clifford) talk about being interviewed by Louis Theroux. Louis also provides insight into how he felt those five shows went and what those people were like to spend time with. The show is interspersed with clips from the shows.

== Awards ==
Winner - 2002 BAFTA TV Award - Richard Dimbleby Award for the Best Presenter (Factual, Features and News) - For the "When Louis Met..." series of films.

Nominated - 2002 Flaherty Documentary Award - For "When Louis Met...The Hamiltons"

"When Louis Met... Jimmy" was voted number 50 in Channel 4's 2005 poll of the 50 greatest documentaries.

== Home releases ==
All episodes of When Louis Met... are available on BBC iPlayer excluding the episode featuring Max Clifford.

When Louis Met... has been released on PAL DVD in a number of best-of sets. Originally, Vol.1/Vol.2 and Vol.3/Vol.4 were released as two disc sets, before being split. Later the 4 volumes were released as a limited edition box set.

- The Best of Louis Theroux's Weird Weekends
  - Louis Theroux's Weird Weekends: Porn
  - Louis Theroux's Weird Weekends: Survivalists
  - Louis Theroux's Weird Weekends: Gangsta Rap
  - Louis Theroux's Weird Weekends: UFOs
  - DVD Bonus: When Louis Met...Jimmy
  - DVD Bonus: In-Vision Commentary by Louis & Jimmy Savile
- The Best of Louis Theroux's Weird Weekends Volume II
  - Louis Theroux's Weird Weekends: Swingers
  - Louis Theroux's Weird Weekends: South Africa
  - Louis Theroux's Weird Weekends: Wrestling
  - Louis Theroux's Weird Weekends: Hypnosis
  - DVD Bonus: When Louis Met...The Hamiltons
  - DVD Bonus: In-Vision Commentary by Louis and the Hamiltons
- The Best of Louis Theroux's Weird Weekends Volume I
  - Louis Theroux's Weird Weekends: Porn
  - Louis Theroux's Weird Weekends: Survivalists
  - DVD Bonus: In-Vision Commentary by Louis and Jimmy Taped in Jimmy's Penthouse
- The Best of Louis Theroux's Weird Weekends Volume II
  - Louis Theroux's Weird Weekends: Wrestling
  - Louis Theroux's Weird Weekends: Hypnosis
  - DVD Bonus: When Louis Met...The Hamiltons
  - DVD Bonus: In-Vision Commentary by Louis and the Hamiltons
- The Best of Louis Theroux's Weird Weekends Volume III
  - Louis Theroux's Weird Weekends: Swingers
  - Louis Theroux's Weird Weekends: South Africa
  - DVD Bonus: In-Vision Commentary by Louis and the Hamiltons
- The Best of Louis Theroux's Weird Weekends Volume IV
  - Louis Theroux's Weird Weekends: Gangsta Rap
  - Louis Theroux's Weird Weekends: UFOs
  - DVD Bonus: When Louis Met...Jimmy
  - DVD Bonus: In-Vision Commentary by Louis and Jimmy Taped in Jimmy's Penthouse
- The Best of Louis Theroux's Weird Weekends Volume I, II, III & IV
  - Louis Theroux's Weird Weekends: Porn
  - Louis Theroux's Weird Weekends: Survivalists
  - DVD Bonus: In-Vision Commentary by Louis and Jimmy Taped in Jimmy's Penthouse
  - Louis Theroux's Weird Weekends: Wrestling
  - Louis Theroux's Weird Weekends: Hypnosis
  - DVD Bonus: When Louis Met...The Hamiltons
  - DVD Bonus: In-Vision Commentary by Louis and the Hamiltons
  - Louis Theroux's Weird Weekends: Swingers
  - Louis Theroux's Weird Weekends: South Africa
  - DVD Bonus: In-Vision Commentary by Louis and the Hamiltons
  - Louis Theroux's Weird Weekends: Gangsta Rap
  - Louis Theroux's Weird Weekends: UFOs
  - DVD Bonus: When Louis Met...Jimmy
  - DVD Bonus: In-Vision Commentary by Louis and Jimmy Taped in Jimmy's Penthouse
- Louis Theroux: The Collection
  - Louis Theroux's Weird Weekends: Porn
  - Louis Theroux's Weird Weekends: Head for the Hills aka Survivalists
  - Louis Theroux's Weird Weekends: Swingers
  - Louis Theroux's Weird Weekends: Black Nationalism
  - Louis Theroux's Weird Weekends: Wrestling
  - Louis Theroux's Weird Weekends: South Africa
  - Louis Theroux's Weird Weekends: Thai Brides
  - Louis Theroux's Weird Weekends: Gangsta Rap
  - When Louis Met...Jimmy
  - When Louis Met...Paul and Debbie
  - When Louis Met...The Hamiltons
  - When Louis Met...Ann Widdecombe
  - When Louis Met...Chris Eubank
  - Louis and the Brothel
  - Louis and the Nazis
  - TV Nation: New Klan
  - TV Nation: Millennium
  - TV Nation: Jerusalem Syndrome
  - TV Nation: Cops for Christ

== See also ==
- List of Louis Theroux documentaries
- Louis Theroux's BBC Two specials
- Louis Theroux's Weird Weekends
