= Twilight of the Porn Stars =

- Directed by: Jason Massot
- Starring: Louis Theroux
- Narrated by: Louis Theroux
- Country of origin: United Kingdom
- Original language: English

Production
- Running time: 60 minutes

Original release
- Release: 10 June 2012

Related
- Extreme Love: Dementia; By Reason of Insanity

Twilight of the Porn Stars is a British documentary created by Louis Theroux for the BBC, aired on 10 June 2012. The documentary is a 60-minute film covering amateur pornography and the rise of video uploads and their effect on the pornography industry. The film is intended as a follow-up to the Louis Theroux's Weird Weekends episode, "Porn".

== See also ==
- List of Louis Theroux documentaries
