= Nazi Pop Twins =

2007 British documentary film

- Directed by: James Quinn
- Starring: Lynx Gaede, Lamb Gaede, April Gaede, Dresden Gaede, Bill Gaede, Dianne Gaede, David Lane
- Original language: English

Production
- Production company: Tiger Aspect Productions

Original release
- Network: Channel 4
- Release: 19 July 2007

Nazi Pop Twins (also known as America's Hate Rock Twins) is a 2007 British documentary wherein filmmaker James Quinn travels to the United States to investigate Prussian Blue, a pop duo composed of twin sisters Lynx and Lamb Gaede. The film first aired on 19 July 2007 on Channel 4 in the United Kingdom. The documentary was filmed over the course of a year. Dresden Gaede, the twins' toddler half-sister and April Gaede's parents, Bill and Dianne, also appear in the documentary.

In a change from a previous documentary featuring the duo, Louis and the Nazis by Louis Theroux, Nazi Pop Twins was without humorous irony. Filmed mainly in low-light, indoors and/or in winter, it stresses tension between the twins and their mother, April — manager and driving force behind the band — and the stress the white nationalist ideology has put on grandparents Bill and Dianne's relationship to the point where Dianne threatens to leave Bill during the making of the program. It also touches on the fact that this ideology seems to have been a factor in the breakup of mother April's marriage, which also happens concurrently to the making of the program. The girls are also shown trying to distance themselves from the "white pride" movement, expressing doubt that it is what they really believe in. For example, Prussian Blue's non-political songs receive a warm reception at a bar in Fresno, until their background is revealed by their mother. David Lane, an incarcerated neo-Nazi domestic terrorist, is heard speaking by telephone with Prussian Blue and termed them "fantasy sweethearts" in a manner Quinn found disturbing and inappropriate.
