= Jiggle Jiggle =

Single by Duke & Jones and Louis Theroux
- Released: 13 May 2022
- Recorded: 2022
- Genre: Hip hop
- Length: 1:37
- Label: Robots + Humans
- Songwriters: Duke & Jones; Louis Theroux; Maurice Mosley; Myreon R. Howard; Neil Diamond

Music video
- "Jiggle Jiggle" on YouTube

"Jiggle Jiggle" is a 2022 single by British-American journalist and documentary maker Louis Theroux, produced by Manchester-based DJ duo Duke & Jones (Isaac McKelvey and Luke Conibear). The song was created based on a rap trend that Theroux had been involved in, featuring a snippet of him rapping on the "Gangsta Rap" episode of the show Weird Weekends.

== Background ==
In 2000, while filming the series 3 finale of Louis Theroux's Weird Weekends, Theroux tried his hand at rapping, being assisted by rappers on local New Orleans radio station WQUE-FM. The rap features an interpolation of the song "Red Red Wine", originally written and performed by Neil Diamond. In 2022, Theroux, on an interview with YouTuber Amelia Dimoldenberg on her web series Chicken Shop Date revisited some of his rapping from the show. The Single's cover art features a Ford Fiesta (third generation) Xr2i rather than the "Fiat" mentioned in the lyrics.

=== TikTok trend ===
Manchester-based duo Duke & Jones, who had created other autotune remixes to random audio clips, posted an autotuned version of the interview on 16 March 2022. The clip quickly went viral on TikTok and other social media platforms, garnering 50 million views on TikTok as of 14 May. More footage was eventually revealed of Theroux rapping, leading to the BBC calling him "a massive hip-hop head".

The trend has seen many TikTok users dance to the autotuned version of the lyric "My money don't jiggle jiggle, it folds..." The song as of 17 May 2022, has been used in 2.6 million TikTok videos.

== Release ==
On 12 April 2022, Duke & Jones released an extended version of the rap from Chicken Shop Date. As of 29 December 2025, the song has garnered over 23 million views on YouTube.

On 12 May 2022, Duke & Jones posted an Instagram video of Theroux recording "Jiggle Jiggle" in a studio, hinting at the release of a new single by Theroux. "Jiggle Jiggle" was released the next day on 13 May.

On 15 July 2022, a remix featuring American singer Jason Derulo and Amelia Dimoldenberg, credited as Amelia Dimz, was released.

== Covers ==
On 12 August 2022, Chris Martin of the British rock band Coldplay performed a piano ballad version of the song at the band's Music of the Spheres concert at Wembley Stadium in London.

== Charts ==
Chart (2022)	Peak position
New Zealand Hot Singles (RMNZ)	29

== Certifications ==
Certifications for "Jiggle Jiggle"
Region	Certification	Certified units/sales
United States (RIAA)	Gold	500,000^{‡}
^{‡} Sales+streaming figures based on certification alone.
