= Louis Theroux: Miami Mega Jail =

- Directed by: Emma Cooper
- Starring: Louis Theroux
- Narrated by: Louis Theroux
- Country of origin: United Kingdom
- Original language: English

Production
- Producer: Emma Cooper
- Running time: 60 minutes (Part 1 and Part 2)

Original release
- Release: 22 May 2011

Related
- America's Most Hated Family in Crisis; America's Most Dangerous Pets

Louis Theroux: Miami Mega Jail is a British television documentary film presented by and featuring Louis Theroux. It is in two parts, with part one initially shown on 22 May 2011 and part two shown on 29 May 2011.

The programme follows Theroux as he spends time in the Miami-Dade County jail system: the Pre-Trial Detention Center (PTDC) (formerly known as DCJ or "Main Jail"); Metro West Detention Center (Metro West); Turner Guilford Knight Correctional Center (TGK); and the Miami-Dade County Corrections and Rehabilitation Department Boot Camp Program.

== Content ==
Theroux spends time in "Main Jail" (PTDC), one of the most notorious sections of the Miami jail system, including time on the fifth and sixth floors of the PTDC, where many of the most volatile inmates are incarcerated. Being held for pre-trial, the inmates are to be considered innocent until proven guilty. In part two, he also spends time in the Miami-Dade Boot Camp.

=== Part 1 ===
Held in large cage-like dwellings, holding up to 24 men, the inmates have developed a strange and violent jail culture. The men remain in the cells almost all the time and may only leave for yard time twice a week, leading to their living under the sway of a gladiatorial code known as "GABOS" ("Game ain’t based on sympathy") where, "The most powerful inmate rules by sheer force of strength." They fight each other for food, for status and often just to pass the endless hours of confinement. Trips to the infirmary for the wounded are a frequent occurrence as inmates viciously attack and beat each other, but the guards say they are powerless to end the abuse. Theroux also follows a couple of men who are transferred out to the Metro West Detention Center.

=== Part 2 ===
Theroux goes deeper into the jail system when he meets an alleged triple murderer, in solitary confinement at TGK, who faces a possible death sentence if convicted.

The journalist also follows a group of forty or so younger inmates who have escaped imprisonment by pleading guilty and agreeing to attend a four-month military-style program at Boot Camp. Amongst them is a 14-year-old boy facing a possible ten-year sentence for armed robbery if he cannot survive the boot camp's brutal training and indoctrination programme. Many will drop out and receive prison sentences, but for a handful this will be their second chance at life.

== Production ==
Theroux travelled from the United Kingdom to Miami, Florida, to meet the inmates. He gained permission for filming in all areas of the jail buildings, including cells occupied by inmates. The Miami New Times also reported on the production of the programme, noting that Theroux often reported on the dark underside of United States culture for the BBC.

== Reception ==
Zoe Williams of the Guardian Media Group's website guardian.co.uk said, "Theroux comes in there without agenda, without influence, just to point and stare. If it were in the UK, you could argue that he was having a cultural effect, changing the mood of the nation with a mind to changing its policies in the longer term, but that doesn't wash in Miami. I say this not because I disapprove, but because it spoils the whole viewer experience. A parade of injustice without prospect of redemption leaves you with nothing but a caged, arid sadness." Liam Tucker of TV Pixie said, "it's must-watch, even if it's soul-destroying." On the Box gave it three stars and said, "Miami Mega Jail suffers from a lack of narrative or destination." Holy Moly said, "As with a lot of Theroux’s work, Miami Mega Jail leaves you feeling a large amount of sadness and disbelief." Christopher Hooton of the Metro labelled the programme 'brave' and 'fascinating, and said that the show exposed the fact that institutionalisation 'is at the heart of much of the recidivism' of the inmates.

== See also ==
- Miami Dade Rehabilitation Department
