= Miami-Dade Corrections and Rehabilitation Department =

Jail system

The Miami-Dade Corrections & Rehabilitation Department (MDCR) of Miami-Dade County, Florida, United States, services all of the county's 30 municipal police departments, the county police department (MDPD), as well as state agencies. The MDCR is the seventh-largest county jail system in the United States as of 2012, with approximately 2,906 employees.

Miami-Dade Corrections Officers are easily identified by their white shirts with green trousers with gray stripe. Miami-Dade Corrections vehicles are identified by their green and white livery. MDCR officers carry silver badges, while officers with the ranks of sergeant and above carry gold badges. The badge is exactly the same as the Miami-Dade County Police Department to reflect the fact that they were at one time one entity. The MDCR operates six detention facilities with a system-wide average of approximately 7,000 inmates, and books approximately 114,000 inmates annually (312 per day). Several facilities are nationally accredited by the American Correctional Association at the state level by the Florida Corrections Accreditation Commission

The department's headquarters is located at 2525 NW 62nd Street, Miami, Florida.

== History ==
=== 19th century ===
When the Dade County Sheriff's Office was created in 1836 to serve the newly created County of Dade, the jail function was a part of that office. There was one county, that later was sub-divided into four counties, Miami-Dade, Broward, Palm Beach, and Martin.

=== 20th century ===
In 1928, a high-rise jail was completed above the courthouse on West Flagler Street. In 1930, the Dade County Stockade was built at S.W. 87th Avenue and 61st Street. This building later served as the Fire Department Headquarters for many years, and remains in use by the County Fire Department.

By 1950, the Dade County area had been reduced to its present size of approximately 2,139 square miles.

In 1954, the City of Miami completed a jail lock-up called the Stockade at 7199 N.W. 41st Street. In 1956 the City of Miami occupied a new headquarters and jail, and they leased the Stockade to the Public Safety Department.

In 1957, a metropolitan form of government was established, and the Dade County Sheriffs' Office was subsequently renamed the Public Safety Department. The Public Safety Department's organizational structure, as determined by the Metropolitan Charter, included responsibility for police, including the main jail and stockade, fire protection, civil defense, animal control, and motor vehicle inspection. In 1960 a unified jail plan was proposed by Dade County, and the first Chief of Dade County Jail was appointed, Captain Noah Scott. Captain Noah Scott commanded four lieutenants, nine Sergeants, and 98 officers. On March 25, 1961, a 10-story criminal justice complex was opened between and attached to the Public Safety Department Headquarters and the Court House. The top four floors' interiors were an empty shell, awaiting future growth.

On January 1, 1968, the City of Miami Stockade was leased to the county for a period of 30 years.

On January 28, 1970, the Corrections & Rehabilitation Department was established by action of the Dade County Commission Section 8.01(D) and Section 4.02 of the Metropolitan Dade County Charter, and Administrative Order 9–22. All duties and functions of the Sheriff's Office which pertained to the booking, incarceration, transportation between County Jail facilities, custody, and release of prisoners who were brought to County jail facilities, were transferred from the Jail and Corrections Division of the Public Safety Department and were delegated to the Director of the Corrections and Rehabilitation Department. The department consisted of two facilities at that time: The Pretrial Detention Center, and the Stockade. Female prisoners were housed on the second floor of the PTDC at that time.

In 1972 the City of Miami opened a new police headquarters. The second-floor jail located at 1145 N.W. 11th Street was transferred ("leased") to the Corrections Department on May 22, 1972, and was used as a facility to house women. It is called the Women's Annex.

On January 1, 1973, the Justice of the Peace Courts, Criminal Court of Record, Circuit Court, Metropolitan Court all merged into the County Court or Circuit Court.

In 1974, the North Dade Detention Center was opened. The master plan was to begin the planning and construction of jails in local communities to service the local population. This facility was the only one built under this concept. In 1976 the North Dade Detention Center was closed and leased to the State of Florida.

In January 1977, all municipal courts were abolished, turning over responsibility to the Dade County Criminal Justice System.

In 1978, a new four-story Women's Detention Center was opened at 1401 N.W. 7th Avenue and all women were transferred from the Women's Anne. Pamala Jo Davis was the Facility Director. In 1978, the empty shell on floors 7–10, except for C-wing, were completed at the PTDC. In 1981 the old Women's Annex was renovated and leased again from the City of Miami for use as a misdemeanor booking facility. It was named the Interim Central Detention Center (ICDC).

In 1987, a temporary facility constructed entirely of modular trailers was opened with 400 beds. It was named the Metro West Detention Center. In 1988 two more temporary fiber cement structures were built on the parking lot of Metro West Detention Center. In 1989 a 9-story high rise was built with 1,000 cells, and was named the Turner, Guilford, Knight Correctional Center. The facility name was in honor of three outstanding local people.

In 1991, all original structures at Metro West Detention Center were torn down when a new 1,002-bed facility was opened on the Northern half of the property. Construction then continued and a 1,230-bed addition was completed over the old facility site in 1994. In 1995 the existing Ward-D with 6 beds was closed and a new location in the Rehabilitation Hospital building with 30 beds was constructed in the Jackson Memorial Hospital Complex.

In 1996, $14 million was expended on water and sewer pipelines and connections to a future site for new facilities. In 1997 $7 million was expended in the preparation of 115 acres (0.47 km^{2}) of swampland for 50 buildable acres (200,000 m^{2}), the working title of the site: Krome Detention Complex. The location of this site is one mile (1.6 km) West of Krome Avenue, with an entrance on Tamiami Trail. The first 500 feet (150 m) of the entrance road is shared with the State of Florida, Department of Corrections facility, the Everglades Correctional Institution.

== Organization ==
MDCR provides detention services in the following locations.

- Pre-Trial Detention Center (PTDC), formerly known as DCJ or Main Jail
- Training & Treatment Center (T&TC), formerly known as the Stockade
- Turner Guilford Knight Correctional Center (TGKCC)
- Metro West Detention Center (MWDC)
- Boot Camp
- Ward-D, located in the Rehabilitation building of Miami-Dade County's Jackson Memorial Hospital
- North Dade Community Correctional Center, formerly known as North Dade Detention Center (temporarily closed)

== Command structure ==
- Director
- Deputy Director Support Service, Deputy Director Custody Services
- Assistant Director Management Services
- Chief Administrative Services Division
- Chief Construction Management Division
- Chief County Services Division
- Chief Fiscal Resources Division
- Chief Professional Compliance Division
- Chief Program Services Division
- Special Services Division
- Transitional Housing Division

== Specialized units ==
- Public Affairs Unit
- Food Service Bureau & Administration
- Internal Affairs
- Training Bureau, located at Miami-Dade Police Departments Training facility.
- Pretrial Release Bureau
- Court Services Division
- K-9 Unit
- Policy and Planning Bureau (PPB)
- Policy Development Unit (PDU)
- Research, Evaluation, and Data Management (RED)
- Inmate Transportation Bureau
- Intake and Release Bureau
- Material Management Bureau
- Information Systems Bureau
- Chaplaincy Services Unit
- Reentry Unit
- Facilities Management Bureau
- Jail Commissary
- Monitored Release
- Medical Services
- Budget & Finance Bureau
- Personnel Bureau

== Operations ==
The current operating budget as of 2009 was $307,938,000.

Inmates that are not bonded out or released in one day are charged daily for their care. This is called a substance fee and it ranges from $2 – $5 per day, and also includes a one-time $10.00 charge for a uniform that is issued in the classification process. Inmates are also charged $3 for visits to jail medical clinics to see a nurse and $5 to see a doctor. Although fees are assessed for every inmate, those that have no money, classified as indigent, pay no fees. Family members may put cash in an inmate's account, from which the inmate pays the substance fees, but may also buy around 200 different items from the commissary, The average length of stay is 22 days. The department served an average of 8,165 meals per day at an average cost of $1.27 per meal. [FY-2008-09]
