= America's Medicated Kids =

2010 British television documentary

- Written by: Louis Theroux
- Starring: Louis Theroux
- Country of origin: United Kingdom
- Original language: English

Production
- Producer: Louis Theroux
- Running time: 59 minutes

Original release
- Release: 18 April 2010

Related
- The City Addicted to Crystal Meth; Law and Disorder in Lagos

America's Medicated Kids is a British documentary that was televised on 18 April 2010. The Louis Theroux documentary ran for 59 minutes. The documentary follows Theroux as he travels to one of America's leading children's psychiatric treatment centres, in Pittsburgh, Pennsylvania, and investigates the effects of putting children diagnosed with mental health disorders on prescription medication and the impact that medicating the child has on the family group.

== Ratings ==
America's Medicated Kids attracted an audience of 2.098 million viewers (8.1%) in the 9pm hour time slot.

== Reception ==
The documentary was met with mostly positive responses.
