= Coalinga State Hospital =

Coordinates: 36°7′51″N 120°14′25″W

- California Department of State Hospitals
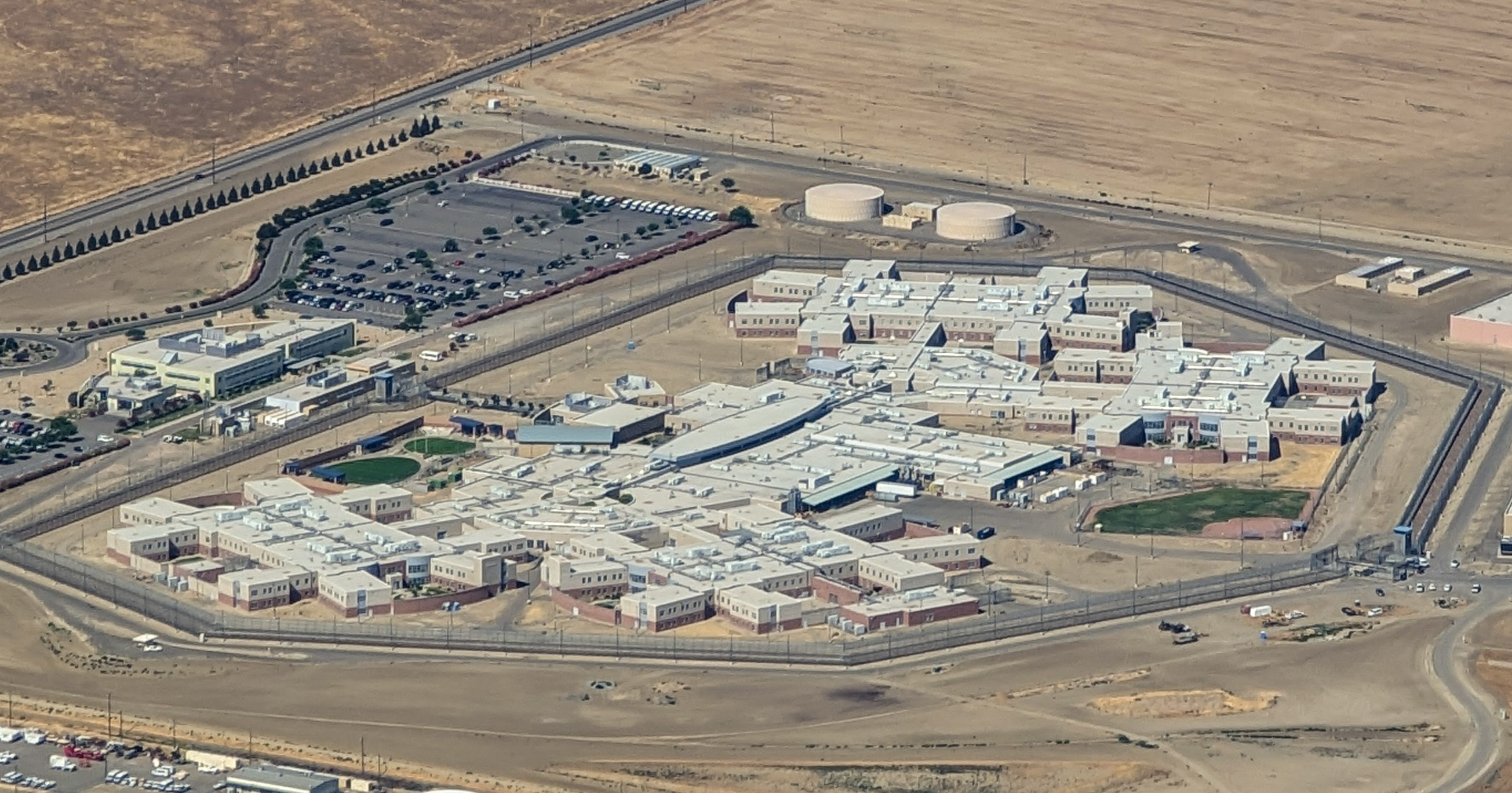
- Coalinga State Hospital aerial view

Geography
- Location: Coalinga, Fresno County, California, United States

Services
- Beds: 1260

History
- Founded: 2005

Links
- Website: www.dsh.ca.gov/Coalinga
- Lists: Hospitals in California

Coalinga State Hospital (CSH) is a state mental hospital in Coalinga, California.

The facility opened on September 5, 2005; it was the first state hospital to be constructed in California in more than 50 years. It is a maximum security facility built to ensure that sexually violent predators are kept separate from the community. Currently, the facility houses 941 individuals alleged to be sexually violent predators and 294 mentally disordered offenders. The facility also houses 50 mentally ill prisoners from the California Department of Corrections and Rehabilitation (CDCR); however, the California Department of State Hospitals designates CSH as a civil commitment facility only. CSH also houses two inmates deemed not guilty by reason of insanity and one individual under the Lanterman–Petris–Short Act.

== Intake and occupancy ==
In California, all prisoners convicted of sexual assault or child sexual abuse are flagged and reviewed six months prior to parole. The law in California dictates that to be provided with the classification as a sexually violent predator, an individual must have at least one identified victim, have been diagnosed with a serious mental illness resulting in volitional impairment (most commonly paraphilia or pedophilia), and must have established a relationship with a person with the intent to cause victimization. Two evaluators do the initial review. If both evaluators agree that the prisoner meets the criteria, he is to be committed to a hospital for treatment. If one agrees and the other does not, an additional two evaluators review the prisoner's history. If those final two reach agreement that the prisoner meets the criteria, the prisoner is considered a ward of the state and is civilly committed to CSH. Controversy regarding those who are labelled as “sexually violent predators” is addressed below.

== About the facility ==
The state began construction on Coalinga State Hospital in the fall of 2001. According to the facility's official website, CSH has 1.2 million gross square feet (gsf) of floor space. This includes 900,000 gsf for clinical services and programs, 158,000 gsf for support services, 75,000 gsf for administration, and 67,000 gsf for plant operations. The facility has an approximate 1,286-bed capacity. The facility is located at the edge of the Coastal Mountain Range in the heart of California just outside the City of Coalinga and in proximity to the Pleasant Valley State Prison. The annual operating budget of CSH is over $200 million (i.e., over $200,000 per person committed).

== Demographics ==
The median age of the committed inhabitants is 47.1; this is expected to increase as the facility's population ages. There are hundreds of older inhabitants who are physically infirm, including those who are unable to walk without the aid of walkers and those who are on life-support systems.

The inhabitant population consists of those who are deemed by the state's evaluators to suffer from "volitional impairment" and dangerousness (in that they are likely to re-offend not of their own free choice).

== Controversy ==
The facility has been the subject of controversy as it has been considered by some to be a place of unconstitutionally punitive detention for those fraudulently deemed both dangerous and mentally ill despite the state knowing otherwise.

It is a maximum security facility labelled (by the government of the state of California) as a "civil-commitment facility" and others as a prison. According to the state, it was built to ensure that individuals labelled as "sexually violent predators" receive treatment for their mental disorder(s) and do not re-offend within the community as a result of their mental disorders. According to others, it is merely a prison. Some have argued that the methodology behind the determination of those who are subject to being detained at such facilities is not scientific and rational, resulting in the detention being merely punitive.

The controversy extended beyond the U.S. when UK Courts identified the detention of certain Coalinga inmates as a human rights violation. This occurred in 2015, when the state of California sought to extradite an alleged child sexual abuser known only as Mr. G from the United Kingdom. (Mr. G was later identified as Roger Alan Giese.) The UK courts did not permit this extradition, as they were made aware that Mr. G could be subject to post-sentence imprisonment at Coalinga State Hospital. The court heard evidence that stated that the Sexually Violent Predator Act's "civil commitment scheme" is applied too broadly in California, meaning that many people could be classed as being of "unsound mind" even if their diagnosis fell "far short" of this definition within the meaning of Article 5 of the European Convention on Human Rights. Therefore, the court ruled that Mr. G's detention at Coalinga would have amounted to a "flagrant" breach of Article 5 of the European Convention on Human Rights.

On December 27, 2019, a petition for a writ of certiorari to the Supreme Court of the United States was filed in the matter of Pashtoon Farooqi v. State of California, challenging, inter alia, conditions of confinement at Coalinga State Hospital. The Supreme Court subsequently refused to hear the case.

== Treatment ==
California law allows persons designated as sexually violent predators to be committed to the facility indefinitely (under Jessica's Law) while they are receiving treatment. Thus, treatment is offered, but is not required. The state's position is that they are offering CSH's inhabitants adequate treatment; namely, what the state refers to as its Sex Offender Treatment Program (SOTP). Approximately 1/3 of inhabitants take part in the Sex Offender Treatment Program (SOTP).

Since 2006, 179 patients have been "unconditionally released"; they have been deemed no longer to meet the criteria identifying them as sexually violent predators and can live freely, although registered as sex offenders. As of April 2009, the facility had released 13 inhabitants into the “out-patient” portion of its program.

The inhabitants detained in this facility have stated that they are faced with a system they believe is one wherein the state has no interest in their being treated, being deemed to have benefited from such treatment, or being subsequently released (as would be the case in a hospital operating under different regulations, standards, or laws). Rather, the inhabitants indicate their experiences suggest the state's intent is to use Coalinga State Hospital as an internment camp by refusing to provide any rational treatment program whatsoever to the committed individuals (i.e., treatment that conforms to that which the Federal Courts deemed to amount to the "minimum standards of treatment" after the State of California had been sued by the U.S. Department of Justice for defrauding mental health patients [under the state's care] of adequate treatment).

The patients stated that the facility refuses to monitor patients' current symptoms of the mandated disorders, to offer a minimum of 20 hours per week of treatment designed to target their alleged disorders, and otherwise to conform to the Mayberg consent decree that resulted from the above-noted U.S. DOJ action. The patients made the claim that staff working at the facility often stare unsympathetically at them while they repeatedly beg staff to provide them with the adequate treatment the facility's administrators are purported to prohibit (i.e., scientifically approved assessments of their assigned volitional impairment disorder, daily sex offender treatment, timely assessments necessary to progress toward release, and documentation of any relevant symptoms of their disorder).

The inhabitants contend that but for these failures, the majority of them would participate in the treatment program. However, choosing not to participate in SOTP and/or other treatment programs does not logically guarantee that the actual and legitimate perceived needs of committed persons would be met either.

Three-quarters of CSH's 850-plus detainees refuse to participate in a core treatment program, undermining a central piece of Coalinga State Hospital's purported mission. The vast majority refuse to participate beyond the first phase of a five-phase therapy regimen. Only 25 to 30 percent of sexually violent predators consent to participate in the active phases of California's sex offender treatment program.

A federal judge ruled a similar program in Minnesota to be unconstitutional. The U.S. District Court for the District of Minnesota held that Minnesota's civil commitment scheme was a punitive system that segregates and indefinitely detains a class of potentially dangerous individuals without the safeguards of the criminal justice system. However, the Eighth Circuit Court of the United States subsequently reversed.

== Notable patients ==
- James Hydrick (born 1959), sex offender
- John David Norman (1927–2011), child pornographer and sex trafficker

== Representation in other media ==
Filmmaker Louis Theroux directed a BBC television documentary based on Coalinga State Hospital; it is entitled A Place for Paedophiles (2009) and shows the lives of CSH patients who are indefinitely incarcerated at the hospital. The one-hour program first aired on BBC Two in the United Kingdom on April 19, 2009, and in Australia in December 2012, as the seventh in a series of Theroux specials. This special will not be shown in the United States. Patient health care laws, primarily the Health Insurance Portability and Accountability Act (HIPAA), forbid disclosure by providers in the U.S. of any protected health information without consent. These laws apply only within the U.S.; that is why the show is allowed to be shown outside the U.S. The program made reference to the fact that some believe the facility is a prison disguised as a hospital.
