= A Place for Paedophiles =

2009 British documentary

- Written by: Louis Theroux
- Starring: Louis Theroux
- Country of origin: United Kingdom
- Original language: English

Production
- Producer: Louis Theroux
- Running time: 60 minutes

Original release
- Release: 19 April 2009

Related
- Law and Disorder in Johannesburg; The City Addicted to Crystal Meth

A Place for Paedophiles is a British documentary that was televised on 19 April 2009. Produced and presented by Louis Theroux, the documentary ran for 60 minutes, and took place at Coalinga State Hospital, a mental hospital in California for sexually violent predators.

== Reception ==
The programme was widely praised for its approach to the subject of paedophilia. Leicester Mercury called the programme "a brilliantly-made, well-observed documentary. Fascinating, not sensationalist or sympathetic."

In 2010, Theroux received a Royal Television Society's award in the best presenter category for the documentary.
