= Louis, Martin & Michael =

2003 British television documentary

- Written by: Louis Theroux
- Starring: Louis Theroux
- Country of origin: United Kingdom
- Original language: English

Production
- Producer: Louis Theroux
- Running time: 71 minutes

Original release
- Release: 16 November 2003

Related
- Louis and the Brothel; Louis and the Nazis

Louis, Martin & Michael is a British documentary that was televised on 16 November 2003.

In June 2002, Michael Jackson briefly visited England; with his friend and unofficial spokesman, Uri Geller, Michael visited the Houses of Parliament and Exeter City. Meanwhile, Louis Theroux, interested in collaborating with Michael on a documentary, checked in to a London hotel where Michael was staying in an attempt to get close to him. He tries contacting Uri Geller to arrange a meeting with Michael, only for the phone to go to voice mail. He then writes Michael a letter which he gives to a security guard outside the singer's hotel room. Outside the hotel, Louis meets former child star and friend of Michael, Mark Lester, who played Oliver Twist in the 1968 film. The next morning, Louis sees Jackson fans protesting against Michael's label Sony for the lack of promotion and sales of his recent album, Invincible, and sees Michael drive past on a double-decker tour bus.

After losing out to Martin Bashir for an opportunity to produce an official Michael Jackson documentary, Louis tries his best to obtain an interview with Michael, but cannot. In the process, Louis is seen meeting with Uri Geller and Michael's father Joseph Jackson. Louis is required to pay $5000 to interview Michael's father. The fee was negotiated through a person named Majestik Magnificent, who claims to be Michael Jackson's (and, previously, Muhammad Ali's) personal magician. Majestik participates in the second of two interviews, often prompting Mr. Jackson or interrupting Louis' questions. Majestik's own fee for securing the interview with Joseph was $500.

Louis comments about Michael during the interview to Joseph: "He is so much in the public eye, I don't think he has very much left for himself."

Joe Jackson confessed in the documentary to spanking Michael, but denied being abusive. After Theroux asks whether Michael would be happy settling down with a partner, an offended Jackson denies his son is gay, voices his disapproval of homosexuality and ends the interview.
