= Louis Theroux: The Settlers =

2025 documentary

- Directed by: Josh Baker
- Written by: Louis Theroux
- Produced by: Sara Obeidat; Matan Cohen
- Starring: Louis Theroux
- Production companies: BBC Film; Mindhouse Productions
- Distributed by: BBC
- Release date: April 27, 2025
- Running time: 61 minutes
- Country: United Kingdom
- Language: English

Louis Theroux: The Settlers is a 2025 BBC documentary film by Louis Theroux about Israeli settlers in the West Bank, where Israeli settlements are considered illegal under international law, and the movement for Israeli settlement of the Gaza Strip during the Gaza war. The film features interviews with Palestinians and Israeli settlers in the occupied West Bank, including prominent far-right Zionist settler Daniella Weiss. The film is a part of Louis Theroux's BBC Two specials.

== Background ==
=== Israeli occupation of the West Bank ===
The West Bank, including East Jerusalem, has been under military occupation by Israel since 7 June 1967, when Israeli forces captured the territory, then occupied by Jordan, during the Six-Day War. (Note: On 7 June 1967, Israel issued "Proclamation Regarding Law and Administration (The West Bank Area) (No. 2)—1967" which established the military government in the West Bank and granted the commander of the area full legislative, executive, and judicial power. The proclamation kept in force local law that existed on 7 June 1967, except where contradicted by any new proclamation or military order (Weill 2007, p. 401; Weill 2014, p. 19)) The West Bank is part of the state of Palestine, and its status as a militarily occupied territory has been affirmed by the International Court of Justice (ICJ) and, with the exception of East Jerusalem, by the Israeli Supreme Court. The West Bank, excepting East Jerusalem, is administered by the Israeli Civil Administration, a branch of the Israeli Ministry of Defense. (Note: Jordan claimed it had a provisional sovereignty over the West Bank, a claim revoked in 1988 when it accepted the Palestinian National Council's declaration of statehood in that year. Israel did not accept this passage of a claim to sovereignty, nor asserted its counterclaim, holding that the Palestinian claim of sovereignty is incompatible with the fact that Israel is, in law, a belligerent occupant of the territory. Secondly it regards the West Bank as a disputed territory on the technical argument that the Fourth Geneva Convention's stipulations do not apply since, in its view, the legal status of the territory is sui generis and not covered by international law, a position rejected by the International Court of Justice (ICJ).) Considered to be a classic example of an "intractable conflict", (Note: "The Israeli-Palestinian conflict is as prototypical case of a conflict which meets the criteria describing an intractable conflict: it is prolonged, irreconcilable, violent and perceived as having zero-game nature and total." (Shaked 2016, p. 134)) Israel's occupation is now the longest in modern history. (Note: "Decisions of the Israeli Supreme Court have held that the Israeli occupation of the territories has endured far longer than any occupation contemplated by the drafters of the rules of international law." (Lazar 1990, p. 7)) Though its occupation is illegal, (Note: The International Court of Justice has rejected the Israeli view that the territory is not occupied and ruled that Israel's "continued presence in the Occupied Palestinian Territory is unlawful" (International Court of Justice 2024).) Israel has cited several reasons for retaining the West Bank within its ambit: historic rights stemming from the Balfour Declaration; security grounds, both internal and external; and the area's symbolic value for Jews.

Israel has controversially, and in contravention of international law, established numerous Jewish settlements throughout the West Bank. The United Nations Security Council has repeatedly affirmed that settlements in that territory are a "flagrant violation of international law", most recently in 2016 with United Nations Security Council Resolution 2334. The ICJ has also found that the establishment of Israeli settlements is illegal under international law. The creation and ongoing expansion of the settlements have led to Israel's policies being criticized as an example of settler colonialism. (Note: The Hebrew word for Jewish settlement across the Green Line is hitnakhalut and for "settlers", mitnakhalim implying an inheritance (nakhal), whereas the contemporary Palestinian Arabic term for them, mustawtinin, etymologically suggests those who have taken root, or indigenized natives, a term that historically has not borne negative connotations. "There was nothing derogatory or prejudicial in the use of the term al-mustawtinin, nor did it apply to Jews alone. It could refer equally to any Muslim who had recently taken up residence in Jerusalem but who had been born elsewhere within the Empire". Down to 1948, Palestinians called Zionist settlements (but not traditional Jewish communities such as those in Hebron, Tiberias and Jerusalem whose residents were often called Yahud awlad Arab, "Arab Jews/Jews who are the sons of Arabs") kubaniya (companies) or musta'amara/mustawtana only in the written language, and settlers khawaja (master, foreigner), musta'amara (colony, implying invasion and musta'amarin (colonizers) entered colloquial usage after 1948. From 1967 to 1993, al-mustawtin ("one who has turned the land into his homeland") and al mustawtana came to the fore to denote, respectively, settlers and settlements in the West Bank and Gaza.)

Israel has been accused of major violations of international human rights law, including collective punishment, in its administration of the occupied Palestinian territories. (Note: "At least five categories of major violations of international human rights law and humanitarian law characterize the occupation: unlawful killings; forced displacement; abusive detention; the closure of the Gaza Strip and other unjustified restrictions on movement; and the development of settlements, along with the accompanying discriminatory policies that disadvantage Palestinians" (HRW 2017a).) Israeli settlers and civilians living or traveling through the West Bank are subject to Israeli law, and are represented in the Knesset; in contrast, Palestinian civilians, mostly confined to scattered enclaves, are subject to martial law and are not permitted to vote in Israel's national elections. (Note: While Arab citizens of Israel, most of whom are ethnically Palestinian, can vote in Israeli national elections and live under civilian, not military, rule, very few live in the West Bank settlements, whose funding and purpose is directed at promoting Jewish residency.) This two-tiered system has caused Israel to be accused of committing apartheid, a charge that Israel rejects entirely. (Note: Julie Peteet also argues that there is an Israeli narrative of exceptionalism which works to "exempt" it from such comparisons (Peteet 2016, p. 249).) Israel's vast military superiority, with a modern army and air force, compared to the Palestinian use of guerrilla tactics, has led to accusations of war crimes on both sides, with Israel being accused of disproportionality and the Palestinians accused of indiscriminate attacks.

The occupation also has numerous critics within Israel itself, with some Israeli conscripts refusing to serve due to their objections to the occupation. The legal status of the occupation itself, and not just the actions taken as a part of it, have been increasingly scrutinized by the international community and by scholars in the field of international law, with most finding that regardless of whether the occupation had been legal when it began, it has become illegal over time. (Note: "even if the occupation was not illegal ab initio, it has been rendered illegal over time for being in violation of the aforementioned jus cogens norms." (Imseis 2023, pp. 197, 215))

=== Israeli settlements ===
Israeli settlements, also called Israeli colonies, are the civilian communities built by Israel throughout the Israeli-occupied territories. They are populated by Israeli citizens, almost exclusively of Jewish identity or ethnicity, and have been constructed on lands that Israel has militarily occupied since the Six-Day War in 1967. The international community considers Israeli settlements to be illegal under international law, but Israel disputes this. In 2024, the International Court of Justice (ICJ) found in an advisory opinion that Israel's occupation was illegal and ruled that Israel had "an obligation to cease immediately all new settlement activities and to evacuate all settlers" from the occupied territories. The population of the settlements increased rapidly over the last 35 years. The expansion of settlements often involves the confiscation of Palestinian land and resources, leading to displacement of Palestinian communities and creating a source of tension and conflict. Settlements are often protected by the Israeli military and are frequently flashpoints for violence against Palestinians. Furthermore, the presence of settlements and Jewish-only bypass roads creates a fragmented Palestinian territory, seriously hindering economic development and freedom of movement for Palestinians.

=== The Ultra Zionists (2011) ===
14 years before The Settlers, Louis Theroux made the 2011 documentary The Ultra Zionists; it was similarly centred on Israeli settlers in the West Bank.

=== Gaza: How to Survive a Warzone (2025) ===
Earlier in 2025, the BBC had released and subsequently pulled a separate documentary on the effect of the Gaza war on children in the Gaza Strip in Palestine titled Gaza: How to Survive a Warzone. It was pulled after it was reported that the child who narrated the film was the son of the deputy minister for agriculture in the ruling Hamas administration.

== Production ==
The film's creation was announced on 10 February 2025. It was commissioned by the BBC's Head of Documentary Commissioning Clare Sillery. It was directed by Josh Baker with senior producer Sara Obeidat, producer Matan Cohen, production manager Emily Wallace, and executive producers Fiona Stourton and Arron Fellows.

Louis Theroux travelled to the West Bank for three weeks in late 2024 to film the documentary. He characterised his style of documentary film making as "perpetrator focused". Describing his intentions when creating the film, he wrote:

My aim was to observe [Israeli ultra-nationalist settlers] up close, to try to understand their mind-set and their actions, and to get a sense of the impact of their presence on the lives of the millions of Palestinians who live in the region.

== Synopsis ==
In the documentary, Theroux interviews and observes both Palestinians living in the occupied West Bank and members of the Israeli settler movement. Theroux interviews Ari Abramowitz, an Israeli settler from Texas, United States, who tells Theroux that he is "uncomfortable" with the word "Palestinians" because "I don’t think they exist as a real nation, with a real claim to this land."

He speaks with and follows prominent far-right Zionist settler Daniella Weiss as she holds meetings of groups aiming to reoccupy the Gaza Strip and makes an attempt to enter the territory herself. During the film, she claims to have recruited 800 Israeli families to become future settlers in the Gaza Strip; she also claims that the movement has the support of Israeli Prime Minister Benjamin Netanyahu, who she says is unable to express it publicly.

Theroux meets Malkiel Bar-Hai, a founder of the settlement Evyatar.

He talks to and travels through the occupied Palestinian city of Hebron with Issa Amro, a Palestinian activist, navigating through IDF checkpoints and around areas in which Amro and other Palestinians are not allowed.

While Theroux is with Mohammad Hureini, a Palestinian activist living under Israeli occupation in Masafer Yatta, Hureini, his crew, and Theroux have to hide in a building as Israeli soldiers point guns and laser sights at them.

== Reception and aftermath ==
Stuart Heritage, writing for The Guardian, frames the film as a comeback for Theroux after his perceived downturn post-COVID-19 pandemic, describing it as a "true watershed moment in his career". He rated it 5 out of 5 stars, as did Gerard Gilbert of The i Paper who described it as "among his best". William Mullally, who similarly rated it a '5/5', of The National wrote that it "has the chance to change hearts and minds around the world" because of Theroux's positive reputation and BBC platform.

In an opinion piece for Middle East Eye, Peter Oborne said that the art of the film was in how it almost exclusively used the words of Israeli settlers themselves to illustrate their "inhumanity" and ethno-nationalist beliefs, but also criticised Theroux for what he viewed as omissions, notably in not using the word apartheid.

Dan Einav of the Financial Times, Phil Harrison of The Independent, and Carol Midgley of The Times rated it 4 out of 5 stars.

Reactions to the film on social media were generally positive.

=== Mohammad Hureini ===
In an opinion piece published on 6 May 2025 by Mondoweiss, Mohammad Hureini, one of the Palestinians featured in The Settlers, criticised the documentary for leaving out parts they filmed where he explained his family's history dating back to the Nakba and his view of what he calls the "ongoing Nakba" from the final film, describing it as a "crucial part" of his story as a Palestinian.

BBC’s choice was clear: to frame the situation as a present day political disagreement rather than the continuation of a decades-long campaign to displace and erase an entire people.

He characterised its exclusion as "sanitiz[ing]" and "dull[ing] the impact" of Palestinians stories. He wrote,

It’s as if they wanted to show the surface of the crisis, without digging into its roots; as if they feared that exposing the full truth about settler colonialism, ethnic cleansing, and the enduring legacy of the Nakba would make viewers uncomfortable. Well, it should make them uncomfortable.

=== Raid on the home of Issa Amro ===
In May 2025, after the film's release, Issa Amro stated in a post on Twitter that his home in Hebron was raided and robbed by Israeli soldiers and settlers in retaliation for his participation in the documentary. His post included videos of settlers forcing themselves onto his property and soldiers with their faces covered by balaclavas. Amro said that Israeli police told him not to file a report and threatened him with arrest. Theroux retweeted Amro's post on his own Twitter page, saying that his team had been in contact with Amro since the documentary and were "monitor[ing] the situation".

== See also ==
- No Other Land, 2024 Palestinian documentary on resistance to the Israeli occupation and forced displacement of Palestinians in Masafer Yatta

== Sources ==
- Adam, Heribert; Moodley, Kogila (2005). Seeking Mandela: Peacemaking Between Israelis and Palestinians. Temple University Press. ISBN 978-1-59213-399-4.
- Bar-Tal, Daniel; Alon, Ilai (2017). "Sociopsychological approach to Trust (or Distrust): Concluding Comments". In Bar-Tal, Daniel (ed.). The Role of Trust in Conflict Resolution: The Israeli-Palestinian Case and Beyond. Springer. pp. 311–333. ISBN 978-3-319-43355-4.
- Benvenisti, Eyal (2012). The International Law of Occupation. Oxford University Press. ISBN 978-0-199-58889-3.
- Beaumont, Peter (19 July 2024). "Why ICJ ruling against Israel's settlement policies will be hard to ignore". The Guardian.
- Chalom, Adam (2014). "Understanding a Religious Western Democracy: Israel and Its Complexities". In Pinn, A. (ed.). Theism and Public Policy: Humanist Perspectives and Responses. Springer. pp. 53–69. ISBN 978-1-137-46530-6.
- Chappell, Bill (1 February 2022). "Israel is an apartheid state, Amnesty International says". National Public Radio. Archived from the original on 13 January 2024.
- Cohen, Amnon (1984). Jewish life under Islam: Jerusalem in the sixteenth century. Harvard University Press. ISBN 978-0-674-47436-9.
- Dinstein, Yoram (2009). The International Law of Belligerent Occupation. Cambridge University Press. ISBN 978-0-521-89637-5.
- Domb, Fania (2007). "The Separation Fence in the International Court of Justice and the High Court of Justice: Commonalities, Differences and Specifics". In Schmitt, Michael N.; Pejic, Jelena (eds.). International Law and Armed Conflict: Exploring the Faultlines: Essays in Honour of Yoram Dinstein. Martinus Nijhoff Publishers. pp. 509–542. ISBN 978-90-47-42125-2.
- Erakat, Noura (2019). Justice for Some: Law and the Question of Palestine. Stanford, CA: Stanford University Press. ISBN 978-0-8047-9825-9.
- Finkelstein, Norman (2018). Gaza: An Inquest into Its Martyrdom. Berkeley, CA: University of California Press. ISBN 978-0-520-29571-1.
- Ghanim, Honaida (2017). "From Kubaniya to Outpost: A Genealogy of the Palestinian conceptualisation of Jewish Settlement in a Shifting National Context". In Handel, Ariel; Allegra, Marco; Maggor, Erez (eds.). Normalizing Occupation: The Politics of Everyday Life in the West Bank Settlements. Indiana University Press. pp. 151–170. ISBN 978-0-253-02505-0.
- Hajjar, Lisa (2005). Courting Conflict: The Israeli Military Court System in the West Bank and Gaza. University of California Press. ISBN 978-0-520-24194-7.
- Handel, Ariel (2014). "Gated/gating community: the settlement complex in the West Bank" (PDF). Transactions of the Institute of British Geographers. 39 (4): 504–517. Bibcode:2014TrIBG..39..504H. doi:10.1111/tran.12045. Archived from the original (PDF) on 30 September 2020.
- Holmes, Oliver (27 April 2021). "Israel is committing the crime of apartheid, rights group says". The Guardian. Archived from the original on 2 February 2022.
- Imseis, Ardi (2023). The United Nations and the Question of Palestine: Rule by Law and the Structure of International Legal Subalternity. Cambridge University Press. ISBN 978-1-316-51389-7.
- "Israel: 50 Years of Occupation Abuses". Human Rights Watch. 4 June 2017a. Archived from the original on 9 April 2024.
- International Court of Justice (19 July 2024). Legal Consequences arising from the Policies and Practices of Israel in the Occupied Palestinian Territory, including East Jerusalem (PDF) (Report). International Court of Justice.
- Karayanni, Michael (2014). Conflicts in a Conflict: A Conflict of Laws Case Study on Israel and the Palestinian Territories. Oxford University Press. ISBN 978-0-199-87371-5.
- Kidron, Peretz (2013). Refusenik!: Israel's Soldiers of Conscience. Zed Books. ISBN 978-1-84813-766-0.
- Kimmerling, Baruch (2003). Politicide: Ariel Sharon's War Against the Palestinians. Verso Books. p. 16. ISBN 978-1-859-84517-2 – via Internet Archive.
- Kumaraswamy, P.R. (2015). Historical Dictionary of the Arab-Israeli Conflict. Historical Dictionaries of War, Revolution, and Civil Unrest. Rowman & Littlefield. ISBN 978-1-4422-5170-0.
- Lazar, Hadara (February 1990). The system of taxation in the West Bank and Gaza Strip as an instrument for the enforcement of Authority during the Uprising (DOC) (Report). B'Tselem. ISSN 0792-4003. Archived from the original on 3 September 2010.
- Lentin, Ronit (2018). Traces of Racial Exception: Racializing Israeli Settler Colonialism. Bloomsbury Publishing. ISBN 978-1-350-03205-7.
- Peteet, Julie (Winter 2016). "The Work of Comparison: Israel/Palestine and Apartheid". Anthropological Quarterly. 89 (1): 247–281. doi:10.1353/anq.2016.0015. JSTOR 43955521. S2CID 147128703.
- Quigley, John B. (2009). "Palestine: The Issue of Statehood". In Silverburg, Sanford R. (ed.). Palestine and International Law: Essays on Politics and Economics. Jefferson, NC and London: McFarland & Company. pp. 37–43. ISBN 978-0-786-44248-5.
- Rathbun, Brian C. (2014). Diplomacy's Value: Creating Security in 1920s Europe and the Contemporary Middle East. Cornell University Press. p. 205. ISBN 978-0-801-45505-6 – via Internet Archive.
- Reuveny, Rafael (Winter 2008). "The Last Colonialist: Israel in the Occupied Territories since 1967" (PDF). The Independent Review. 12 (3): 325–374. Archived (PDF) from the original on 1 June 2023.
- Shafir, Gershon (November 1984). "Changing Nationalism and Israel's "Open Frontier" on the West Bank". Theory & Society. 13 (6): 803–827. doi:10.1007/BF00209214. JSTOR 657140. S2CID 144216444.
- Shaked, Ronni (2016). "Ethos of Conflict of the Palestinian Society". In Sharvit, Keren; Halperin, Eran (eds.). A Social Psychology Perspective on The Israeli-Palestinian Conflict: Celebrating the Legacy of Daniel Bar-Tal. Vol. 2. Springer Publishing. pp. 133–149. ISBN 978-3-319-24841-7.
- Sharkey, Heather J. (2003). Living with Colonialism: Nationalism and Culture in the Anglo-Egyptian Sudan. University of California Press. ISBN 978-0-520-23559-5.
- "Israel's Settlements Have No Legal Validity, Constitute Flagrant Violation of International Law, Security Council Reaffirms". United Nations Security Council. 23 December 2016. Archived from the original on 22 February 2020.
- Weill, Sharon (2007). "The judicial arm of the occupation: the Israeli military courts in the occupied territories". International Review of the Red Cross. 89 (866): 395–418. doi:10.1017/s1816383107001142. ISSN 1816-3831. S2CID 55988443.
- Weill, Sharon (2014). The Role of National Courts in Applying International Humanitarian Law. Oxford University Press. ISBN 978-0-19-968542-4.
- Zureik, Elia (2015). Israel's Colonial Project in Palestine: Brutal Pursuit. Routledge. ISBN 978-1-317-34046-1.
