= African Hunting Holiday =

2008 film

- Written by: Louis Theroux
- Starring: Louis Theroux
- Country of origin: United Kingdom
- Original language: English

Production
- Producer: Louis Theroux
- Running time: 60 minutes

Original release
- Release: 2008

Related
- Louis Theroux: Behind Bars; Law and Disorder in Philadelphia

African Hunting Holiday is a 2008 British documentary by Louis Theroux.

Theroux journeys to Limpopo Province, South Africa to join the foreign holidaymakers who flock there to hunt big game in so-called "canned" safaris where animals are purpose bred to be hunted in enclosures, including controversial animals such as lions. The documentary features not only the hunters but also the individuals who run the safaris, and the effects they have on the numbers of certain species in these areas.

== Reception ==
The programme received mixed reviews.
