= The Ultra Zionists =

2011 BBC documentary by Louis Theroux

- Written by: Louis Theroux
- Directed by: Andy Wells
- Starring: Louis Theroux
- Country of origin: United Kingdom
- Original language: English

Production
- Producer: Andy Wells
- Running time: 60 minutes

Original release
- Network: BBC
- Release: 3 February 2011

Related
- Law and Disorder in Lagos; America's Most Hated Family in Crisis

The Ultra Zionists is a British BBC documentary by Louis Theroux released on 3 February 2011. In the film, Theroux investigates ultranationalist Jewish settlers in East Jerusalem, Hebron and Nablus within the Israeli occupied West Bank, Palestine. The documentary also follows Theroux as he tours the Muslim quarter of Jerusalem with Daniel Luria of Ateret Cohanim.

== Synopsis ==
In The Ultra Zionists, Louis Theroux interviews a group of ultranationalist Israelis at the border of advancing settlements in the West Bank.

He explores Israelis who consider it a religious imperative for them to settle in some of the most widely disputed areas of East Jerusalem, land legally recognized as part of Palestine under international law, especially areas with a spiritual significance set down in the Bible. One such individual he speaks with is Daniel Luria, a hardline nationalist from Australia, who works for Ateret Cohanim, an organization that aims to create a Jewish majority in East Jerusalem.

== See also ==
- Louis Theroux: The Settlers, 2025 documentary by Theroux also on Israeli settlers in the West Bank – 2025 documentary
