= Louis Theroux: Behind Bars =

2008 British television documentary

- Directed by: Stuart Cabb
- Starring: Louis Theroux
- Country of origin: United Kingdom
- Original language: English

Production
- Producer: Stuart Cabb
- Running time: 60 minutes

Original release
- Network: BBC Two
- Release: 13 January 2008

Related
- Louis Theroux: Under the Knife; African Hunting Holiday

Louis Theroux: Behind Bars is a television documentary written and presented by Louis Theroux about one of America's most notorious prisons, San Quentin. There, he meets and speaks to serial murderers, gang members, at-risk inmates and guards. The film was produced and directed by Stuart Cabb, and was first aired on BBC Two on 13 January 2008.

== Reception ==
It was ranked the tenth most watched programme of the decade on BBC Two when it was first aired in 2008, after gaining 5.81 million viewers. The day after the film was first broadcast, it accounted for 27% of the activity on the BBC iPlayer, and it was the second most-watched programme on the service in the first quarter of 2008, behind The Apprentice.

In The Guardian, Sam Wollaston said the documentary was "absolutely fascinating, one of Theroux's finest films". He described Theroux as "remarkably relaxed and at home", with access that was "extraordinary, and could never have happened in this country". Andrew Billen for The Times said, after watching the film for the first time: "I thought that Theroux was slightly overawed by his subject and less nosey than he should have been. Watching it again, I realised the prison's inmates were so strangely overarticulate that they did not need interrogating." The Daily Telegraph's Stephen Pile said that Theroux "did not have to do much; just pointing a camera at them was enough to fill 60 fascinating minutes showing the banality of evil." Despite the two weeks Theroux spent at the prison, Gordon Farrer for The Age said that "there's not a lot of effort on Theroux's part to elicit insights into the social issues raised by a place like San Quentin or to put it into a broader social context. The result is an interesting profile of a brutal, unnatural social experiment that leaves you wanting to know much more."

For The Independent's Thomas Sutcliffe, Theroux's "wide-eyed innocence is part of the brand", which "has proved rather useful in the past ... But that it can have its drawbacks was illustrated by Louis Theroux: Behind Bars. He also found Theroux's "studied cluelessness was obstructive rather than helpful". In the New Statesman, Rachel Cooke wrote that "It was all very interesting, in its own gruesome, voyeuristic way", but found it failed to develop a serious narrative. Closing her review, titled 'Enough playing dumb', she said: "Great material comes his way but he (and his director) just don't seem to be deft enough to handle it. That's when disingenuous starts to look plain dumb."

The film was nominated for the best sound (factual) award for the 2008 British Academy Television Craft Awards.
