= Prussian Blue (duo) =

American Neo-Nazi pop band

- Origin: Bakersfield, California
- Genres: Pop; pop rock; folk rock
- Years active: 2003–2007
- Label: Resistance
- Past members: Lynx Gaede; Lamb Gaede

Prussian Blue was an American pop music duo composed of Lynx Vaughan Gaede and Lamb Lennon Gaede, sororal twins born on June 30, 1992, in Bakersfield, California. The duo was formed in early 2003 by their mother, April Gaede, a member of the neo-Nazi organization National Alliance. Their music was described as racist and white supremacist, promoting neo-Nazi rhetoric such as Holocaust denial. Lynx and Lamb ceased touring when they were about 14 years old. In later interviews, they renounced their political views.

== History ==
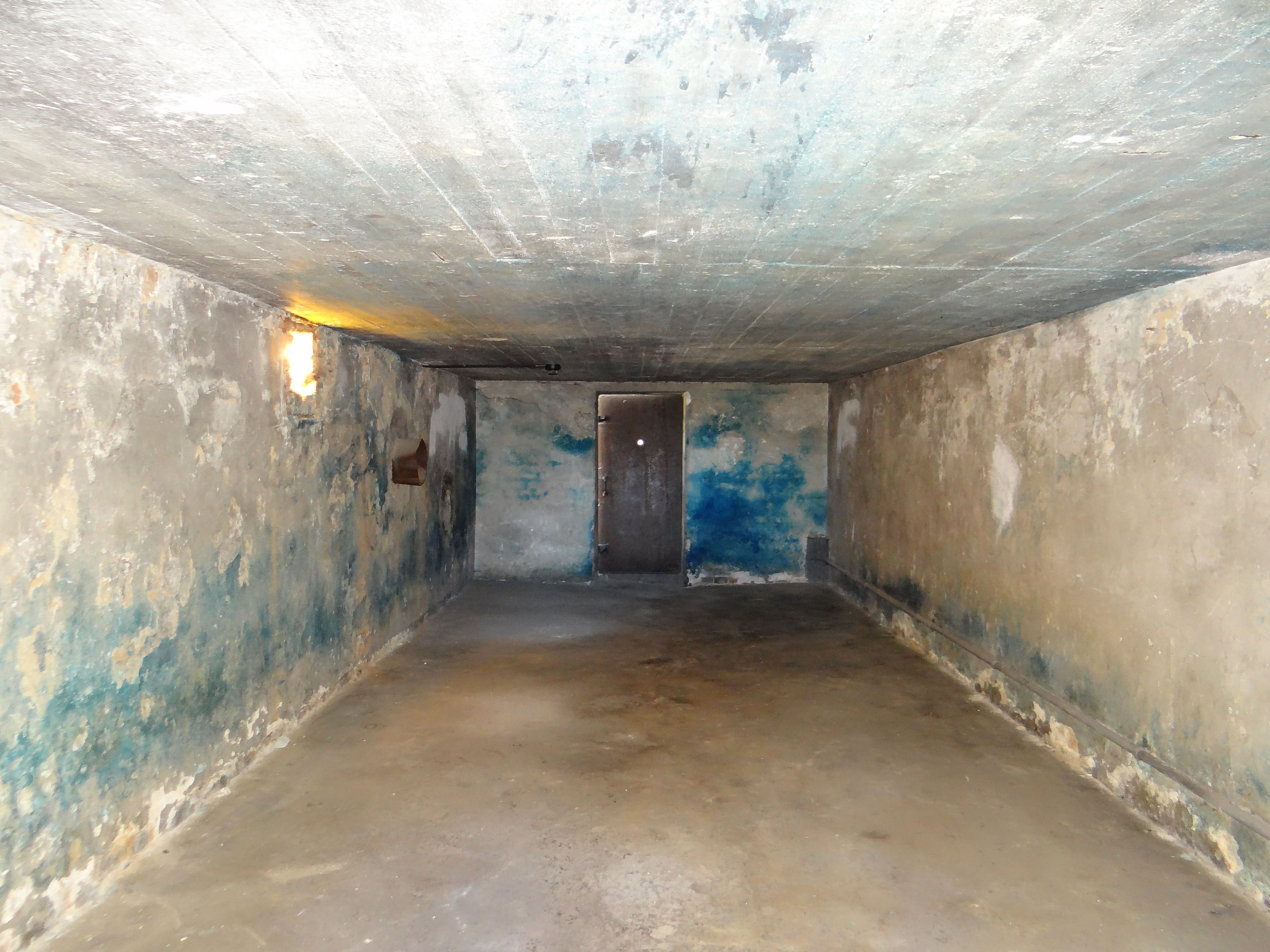
Prussian blue residue on the gas chamber at Majdanek concentration camp

In an interview with Vice, the twins stated, "Part of our heritage is German American. Also our eyes are blue, and Prussian Blue is just a really pretty color." They also remarked, "there is also the discussion of the lack of 'Prussian Blue' coloring (Zyklon B residue) in the so-called gas chambers in the concentration camps. We think it might make people question some of the inaccuracies of the 'Holocaust' myth." This is a reference to claims made by many Holocaust deniers that the Holocaust either did not happen or had far fewer victims.

Lynx and Lamb Gaede first performed by singing at a white nationalist festival called "Eurofest" in 2001. They began learning how to play instruments in 2002 (Lamb plays the guitar and Lynx plays the violin). In the same year they appeared on a VH1 special, Inside Hate Rock. In 2003, they featured in a Louis Theroux BBC documentary, Louis and the Nazis, on racism and white supremacy in the United States. Lamb, Lynx, and their mother, April Gaede, also appeared in the low-budget 2003 horror film Dark Walker.

Prussian Blue recorded and released a debut CD at the end of 2004 called Fragment of the Future (Resistance Records) which had both acoustic folk-rock and bubblegum-pop sounds. A year later, they recorded their second album, The Path We Chose, which has a more traditional rock sound including both acoustic and electric guitar. Most of the songs on the second album lack the racial and white supremacist overtones of Fragment of the Future and are about more mainstream subject matter, such as boys, crushes, and dating. On October 20, 2005, Prussian Blue was featured in a critical segment on ABC's Primetime. A DVD, Blonde Hair Blue Eyes, featuring three music videos and some live performances, was released in 2005. The pair toured the United States in 2005. On August 22, 2006, they were again featured in a critical segment on ABC's Primetime.

The twins moved from Bakersfield to Kalispell in Montana, in 2006; in their mother's words, Bakersfield was "not white enough." Some of their new neighbors did not welcome them; many city residents passed out flyers warning people of the family's views, and signs proclaiming "No Hate Here" appeared on some windows around the town. Some of the people who passed out flyers received threatening letters from members of out-of-state white supremacist organizations. The Montana Human Rights Network planned a rally in Kalispell to protest against the family's racist views.

The twins toured Europe in the summer of 2007, performing at events for white nationalist organizations. They also appeared as guests on The Political Cesspool. But as of early 2009, the band's website and MySpace page were no longer operational.

== Ideology ==
The duo had strong ties to the National Vanguard organization, a "white nationalist" group which was formed by disaffected former members of the National Alliance. Their ideology has been described as racist and white supremacist by mainstream media outlets. The Daily Telegraph reported that, on stage, the twins executed Nazi salutes.

According to ABC News, the girls were homeschooled by their mother, April Gaede, an activist and a writer for National Vanguard. The twins' maternal grandfather, who lives in Squaw Valley, Fresno County, California, wears a Nazi swastika belt buckle; he also features the swastika on his truck and he has registered it as a cattle brand. During their ABC interview, the twins said they believed that Adolf Hitler was a great man with good ideas, and they described the Holocaust as being exaggerated. They have also been criticized for stipulating that the goods they donated to Hurricane Katrina victims should only go to white people.

By 2011, they had changed their views. A 2011 profile in The Daily describes the twins' thoughts on the band:

But after enrolling in public school and moving to Montana — a predominantly white state, albeit one with a decidedly hippie-ish vibe — Lamb and Lynx decided they simply no longer believed what they'd been taught. ..."I'm glad we were in the band," Lynx said, "but I think we should have been pushed toward something a little more mainstream and easier for us to handle than being front-men for a belief system that we didn't even completely understand at that time. We were little kids.

They still made statements in which they expressed skepticism about some elements of the Holocaust.

In 2020, the twins said they were now "pretty liberal" and pitied their mother. They said: "Those little girls were so separate from what we are now. We were very removed. Even watching it now, it’s very hard. We didn’t comprehend and understand fully, how controversial those topics are."

== Lyrics and influences ==
About half of the songs on Prussian Blue's first album are covers of other songs which were put out by other white pride bands and one of them was co-written by David Lane and a few of the other songs were written by Ian Stuart Donaldson. One of their cover songs was put out by the racist band RaHoWa. Two of Prussian Blue's original compositions on their first album are dedicated to prominent Nazis and white nationalist activists.

In 2006, a compilation album was released by the far right National Democratic Party of Germany (NPD) titled For The Fatherland.

== Media ==
Prussian Blue appeared in two British television documentaries. The first, 2003's Louis and the Nazis by documentary maker Louis Theroux, was an account of white nationalists, including Prussian Blue. The second, Nazi Pop Twins, by James Quinn, was first aired in 2007. This documentary stressed the tension that existed between the twins and their mother, April. In this documentary, Lynx and Lamb disavowed their mother's race-related views and said that they want to perform music that was not focused on race. Lynx told Quinn that they wore the infamous T-shirts bearing a smiley face that resembled Adolf Hitler because she believed they "were a joke" and said that "being proud of being white" did not mean she was a racist. Louis Theroux revisited the twins and their mother to collect material for his book Call of the Weird.

In early September 2020, the twins were featured in another documentary by Louis Theroux called Louis Theroux – Life on the Edge: Beyond Belief which originally aired on BBC Two. It explored the twins' journey of leaving what they described as their racist ideology.

== Discography ==
=== Albums ===
- Fragment of the Future (2004)
- The Path We Chose (2005)
- For the Fatherland (compilation, 2006)

=== Singles ===
- "Your Daddy"
- "Keepers of the Light" (Battlecry featuring Prussian Blue)
- "Stand Up"
- "I Will Bleed for You"
