= Louis Theroux: Gambling in Las Vegas =

2007 British television documentary

- Written by: Louis Theroux
- Starring: Louis Theroux, Allan Erlick
- Country of origin: United Kingdom
- Original language: English

Production
- Running time: 60 minutes

Original release
- Network: BBC Two
- Release: 4 February 2007

Related
- Louis and the Nazis; The Most Hated Family in America

Louis Theroux: Gambling in Las Vegas is a TV documentary written and presented by Louis Theroux. He heads to the Las Vegas Hilton, to reveal the world behind the myths of casino culture. Among the people he meets are two of the casino's 'high-rollers' and an employee who looks after them as well as a retired doctor who says she has gambled away $4 million in seven years. The programme was first broadcast on 4 February 2007 on BBC Two.

== Reception ==
The Times newspaper gave the documentary a positive review. The Sydney Morning Herald commented "There's an element of prurient ogling at the sheer, mind-boggling waste but Theroux also attempts to unravel the troubled relationship between the largesse the casino bestows upon its favourites and the resulting gratitude and loyalty of the gamblers - many of whom fall into the "addicted" category, much as they would deny it."
