= By Reason of Insanity (TV series) =

- Directed by: Louis Theroux
- Country of origin: United Kingdom

Original release
- Network: BBC
- Release: 22 March – 29 March 2015

By Reason of Insanity is a two-part 2015 BBC documentary miniseries by Louis Theroux. It focuses on the lives of mental patients at two of Ohio's state psychiatric hospitals Twin Valley Behavioral Healthcare and Summit Behavioral Healthcare who have been sent there after committing crimes but having been acquitted by reason of insanity.

== See also ==
- List of Louis Theroux documentaries
