= Louis Theroux: Under the Knife =

2007 British television documentary

- Starring: Louis Theroux
- Country of origin: United Kingdom
- Original language: English

Production
- Running time: 60 minutes

Original release
- Release: 7 October 2007

Related
- The Most Hated Family in America; Louis Theroux: Behind Bars

Louis Theroux: Under the Knife is a TV documentary written and presented by Louis Theroux about the people and doctors involved in plastic surgery operations. Filmed mostly in the US, in the programme, Louis himself ends up getting liposuction.
