= Louis Theroux's Weird Weekends =

- Title card from Season 3
- Starring: Louis Theroux
- Opening theme: Mini Skirt by Esquivel
- Country of origin: United Kingdom
- Original language: English
- No. of series: 3
- No. of episodes: 17

Production
- Executive producer: David Mortimer
- Running time: 50 minutes

Original release
- Network: BBC Two
- Release: 15 January 1998 – 30 October 2000

Louis Theroux's Weird Weekends is a television documentary series, in which Louis Theroux gives viewers the chance to get brief glimpses into the worlds of individuals and groups that they would not normally come into contact with or experience up close. In most cases, this means interviewing people with extreme beliefs of some kind, or just generally belonging to subcultures not known to exist by most or just frowned upon. It was first shown in the United Kingdom on BBC2. In 2001, Theroux was awarded the Richard Dimbleby Award as well as the Best Presenter BAFTA for his work on the series.

Theroux's view on Weird Weekends:

Weird Weekends sets out to discover the genuinely odd in the most ordinary setting. To me, it's almost a privilege to be welcomed into these communities and to shine a light on them and, maybe, through my enthusiasm, to get people to reveal more of themselves than they may have intended. The show is laughing at me, adrift in their world, as much as at them. I don't have to play up that stuff. I'm not a matinee idol disguised as a nerd.

== Episodes ==
=== Series overview ===
Series	Episodes	Originally released	
Series	Episodes	First released	Last released
1	5	15 January 1998	23 December 1998
2	6	12 May 1999	6 July 1999
3	6	25 September 2000	30 October 2000

=== Series 1 (1998) ===
No. overall	No. in series	Title	Original release date
1	1	"Born Again Christians"	15 January 1998
In Dallas, Louis meets TV evangelists Marcus and Joni Lamb, and joins a group of hardline Christians called "The Family" as they visit the Deep Ellum entertainment district.
2	2	"UFOs"	22 January 1998
This episode follows several people who believe in UFOs. One of these is a man called Thor Templar, the self-titled "Lord Commander of the Earth Protectorate". He claims to have killed more than twenty aliens.
3	3	"Porn"	29 January 1998
This episode offers a look at very different sides of the porn industry, as Louis interviews both male and female porn stars. He reveals the problems a lot of porn actors face, be it not getting a job in straight porn and therefore having to do gay porn, or not getting an erection when it is needed.
4	4	"Survivalists"	5 February 1998
In Idaho, Louis meets military enthusiasts and right-wing patriots (such as Bo Gritz) who are preparing for a global catastrophe, including trips to survivalists' store Safetrek and a mountain refuge for conspiracy theorists called Almost Heaven. Louis also visits the Aryan Nation Church and helps to build a straw-bale home. The episode focuses on the survivalism movement and communities formed around it. That several self-proclaimed survivalists were also hippies and environmentalists is a recurring theme.
5	5	"Weird Christmas"	23 December 1998
Louis invites someone from each of the four episodes of series 1 to his home for Christmas.

=== Series 2 (1999) ===
No. overall	No. in series	Title	Original release date
6	1	"Infomercials"	12 May 1999
Louis attempts to become a presenter on Florida's Home Shopping Network TV channel and meets Anthony Sullivan and Billy Mays. He also meets people who invent, sell and make a fortune from products such as the Win Gym.
7	2	"Swingers"	26 May 1999
Louis meets a couple from Southern California who host swinging parties. He visits one of these to find out what drives couples to want to swap partners. This programme also offers a brief look into other kinds of swinging through an organisation that has a database of members that are rated on a scale of 1 to 10. Under this system, people rated highly are invited to exclusive parties intended to keep out unattractive, socially awkward, or otherwise undesirable people.
8	3	"Black Nationalism"	2 June 1999
American black nationalist groups have been branded anti-Semitic, homophobic, misogynist and racist by the mainstream press. Louis Theroux goes to Harlem in New York to meet its proponents, and meets the Reverend Al Sharpton, the main point of contact in the black nationalist movement. Theroux also meets Khalid Abdul Muhammad, dubbed by the media 'the most dangerous man in America' and visits the Israelite School of Universal Practical Knowledge, who believe that blacks are the true Israelites and that all English monarchs until early modern times were black. Theroux also joins Al Sharpton on a march on Wall Street to protest at the shooting by New York police of Amadou Diallo, who was shot at 41 times and killed.
9	4	"Demolition Derby"	9 June 1999
Louis has to overcome his nerves to enter a demolition derby in car-mad Michigan.
10	5	"Off-Off Broadway"	15 June 1999
Louis meets the hordes of out-of-work actors in New York as they try to land a part – and even goes on an audition himself, for a job on a Norwegian cruise ship, in front of Craig Revel Horwood.
11	6	"Wrestling"	6 July 1999
Louis takes a look at different types of wrestling from the high profile World Championship Wrestling (WCW) to people organizing events in their spare time. He meets several WCW wrestlers, including Rowdy Roddy Piper, Goldberg, Randy Savage, Berlyn, Raven, and Pez Whatley. He also visits the WCW Power Plant, a training facility where some of the WCW wrestlers started out. The training he receives there from DeWayne Bruce shows him that some wrestlers will not break kayfabe (the illusion of fiction being fact) and will take exception when their profession's authenticity is questioned. Also Chuck Palumbo makes a cameo at the 33 minute mark.

=== Series 3 (2000) ===
No. overall	No. in series	Title	Original release date
12	1	"Self-Fulfilment"	25 September 2000
Louis meets a Las Vegas hypnotist who claims he can make dreams come true and meets Ross Jeffries who teaches chat-up techniques.
13	2	"Indian Gurus"	2 October 2000
Louis travels to India to witness Westerners seeking enlightenment. In Goa he meets 57-year-old American astrologer (and former psychology professor) "Deepak" who studies meditation. He moves on to meet Mike, who is a follower of Swami Ganapathi Sachchidananda, and Amma who is popularly known as the hugging saint. He then re-joins Amma on a pilgrimage with 400 believers on their three-month tour of India.
14	3	"Whites"	9 October 2000
Louis meets white separatists who dream of building non-black communities in post-apartheid South Africa, including Neo-Nazi leader Eugène Terre'Blanche.
15	4	"Body Building"	16 October 2000
Louis looks at the world of body building in the USA, including the female body building fetish scene and producers of wrestling videos.
16	5	"Looking for Love"	23 October 2000
Louis visits a Bangkok marriage agency where Western men meet Thai brides.
17	6	"Gangsta Rap"	30 October 2000
Louis travels to America's South to have a look at the gangsta rap scene known as the "Dirty South". He starts his own Gangsta rap, having a CD cover designed for him as well as getting the rappers Reese and Bigalow to write a song for him to perform on a rap radio show. Other parts include him interviewing pimp turned rapper Mello T, as well as rap superstar Master P. "Jiggle Jiggle" was created based on a rap trend that Theroux had been involved in.

== Book ==
In 2005 Louis released a book called The Call of the Weird: Travels in American Subcultures where he revisits people he previously interviewed for the Weird Weekends documentaries. He attempts to track down ten of his subjects, up to seven years after the shows, claiming a desire to see what "changes in their subcultures might say about the changes in the world at large", or at least "curious of what became of some of the odd folk [he] got to know".

He tracks down Thor Templar (alien resistance commander), JJ Michaels (porn star), Ike Turner (musician and ex-husband of Tina, from an uncompleted episode), Mike Cain (survivalist), Haley (prostitute), Jerry Gruidl (Aryan Nations), Mello T (pimp turned rapper), Oscody (survivor of Heaven's Gate, also from an incomplete episode), Marshall Sylver (Hypnotist), and Lamb & Lynx (the singing White Nationalist twins – aged 11).

== See also ==
- List of Louis Theroux documentaries
- Louis Theroux's BBC Two specials
- When Louis Met...
