= Law and Disorder in Lagos =

2010 British television documentary

- Written by: Louis Theroux
- Directed by: Jason Massot
- Starring: Louis Theroux
- Country of origin: United Kingdom
- Original language: English

Production
- Producers: Jason Massot and Nick Mirsky
- Running time: 60 minutes

Original release
- Release: 10 October 2010

Related
- America's Medicated Kids; Ultra Zionists

Law and Disorder in Lagos is a 2010 British documentary film by Louis Theroux.

Theroux journeys to Lagos, the largest city in Nigeria, to investigate the nature of law and order in the rapidly expanding city. There he follows the Government-run paramilitary task force KAI (Kick Against Indiscipline), notorious union leader MC Oluomo, and young gang members known as "Area boys" who unofficially run neighbourhoods for money.

On 30 September 2015, Kunle "Mammok" Mamowora, Theroux's guide around Lagos and Chief Security Officer to MC Oluomo, was shot and killed by assailants who were believed to be members of a rival political group.

== See also ==
- Law and Disorder in Philadelphia
- Law and Disorder in Johannesburg
