= Law and Disorder in Johannesburg =

Documentary film on crime in South Africa

- Written by: Louis Theroux
- Starring: Louis Theroux
- Country of origin: United Kingdom
- Original language: English

Production
- Producer: Louis Theroux
- Running time: 60 minutes

Original release
- Release: 7 December 2008

Related
- Law and Disorder in Philadelphia; A Place for Paedophiles

Law and Disorder in Johannesburg is a Louis Theroux documentary about the crime and private security situation in Johannesburg, South Africa. Theroux travels with heavily armed private security contractors who fill a security vacuum left by the government's inability to provide adequate security via normal means, such as policing and dealing with hijacked buildings. Theroux also meets with local people in Black townships, who practice vigilantism against suspected criminals.

== Reception ==
The Leicester Mercury described the programme as "a tense, depressing and occasionally gobsmacking film shot in a city plucked from the pages of some kind of dystopian novel."

== See also ==
- Private security industry in South Africa
- Crime in South Africa
- Law and Disorder in Philadelphia
- Law and Disorder in Lagos
