= Law and Disorder in Philadelphia =

- Written by: Louis Theroux
- Starring: Louis Theroux
- Country of origin: United Kingdom
- Original language: English

Production
- Producer: Louis Theroux
- Running time: 68 minutes

Original release
- Release: 30 November 2008

Related
- African Hunting Holiday; Law and Disorder in Johannesburg

Law and Disorder in Philadelphia (also titled Killadelphia) is a 2008 British documentary by Louis Theroux.

Theroux investigates the high crime rates in one of the United States' largest cities, Philadelphia, mainly from the perspective of the local police as well as people affected by, and possibly involved in, crime in the city's low-income neighborhoods.

== Reception ==
The programme was met with a mixed response. The Independent said "It was a fascinating film, though, in part because of the utter dereliction of this particular patch of the inner city, but also because it confirmed that The Wire had, if anything, understated its portrait of civil breakdown."

The Times described it as "It was a depressing tour streaked with black humour but Theroux seemed out of depth analysing what he saw. He is at his best getting to know and under the skin of his subjects."

== See also ==
- Crime in Philadelphia
- Law and Disorder in Johannesburg
- Law and Disorder in Lagos
