= Louis and the Nazis =

2003 British documentary

- Title card from Louis and the Nazis
- Written by: Louis Theroux
- Directed by: Stuart Cabb
- Starring: Louis Theroux
- Country of origin: United Kingdom
- Original language: English

Production
- Executive producers: Stuart Cabb, David Mortimer
- Producer: Stuart Cabb
- Editor: Danny Collins
- Running time: 80 minutes

Original release
- Network: BBC Two
- Release: 21 December 2003

Related
- Louis, Martin & Michael; Louis Theroux: Gambling in Las Vegas

Louis and the Nazis is a British documentary that was televised in 2003 on December 21. It was directed by Stuart Cabb and written by Louis Theroux. The documentary ran for 70 minutes.

Louis travels to California to meet the man dubbed "the most dangerous racist in America", Tom Metzger. Louis meets him, his family, and his publicity manager, and follows him to skinhead rallies and on a visit to Mexico. He also encounters Lynx and Lamb Gaede of Nazi-pop folk duo Prussian Blue, their mother April Gaede, and maternal grandfather Bill Gaede. Louis Theroux would revisit the subjects of the documentary in his book The Call of the Weird: Travels in American Subcultures.

== Reception ==
The New Zealand Listener said "Louis and the Nazis is the most brilliant TV programme I wish I’d never seen." The Times described the documentary as "sinister and unsettling." The Guardian also gave the programme a positive review.
