= The City Addicted to Crystal Meth =

2009 documentary film

- Written by: Louis Theroux
- Starring: Louis Theroux
- Country of origin: United Kingdom
- Original language: English

Production
- Producer: Louis Theroux
- Running time: 60 minutes

Original release
- Release: 9 August 2009

The City Addicted to Crystal Meth is a British documentary by Louis Theroux. It was televised on 9 August 2009. Theroux filmed his documentary in Fresno, California, which has one of the highest number of crystal meth users in the United States.

== Reception ==
The documentary garnered mixed reviews. The Times said "Theroux risks becoming the Alan Whicker de nos jours, a tourist with a typewriter, peering into these other lives but rarely getting dirty himself."

The Guardian called the work "an extraordinary film, a sad portrait of a very different California".
