= Louis and the Brothel =

2003 film by Louis Theroux

- Written by: Louis Theroux
- Starring: Louis Theroux
- Country of origin: United Kingdom
- Original language: English

Production
- Producer: Louis Theroux
- Running time: 77 minutes

Original release
- Network: BBC Two
- Release: 9 November 2003

Louis and the Brothel is a 2003 British documentary by Louis Theroux.

Theroux visits the Wild Horse Adult Resort & Spa, a licensed brothel located near the city of Reno, Nevada, where he investigates how the brothel is run. During his visit Theroux interviews the owners who personally run the resort, the women who work there as prostitutes, and their clients.

Theroux would revisit the subjects of the documentary in his book The Call of the Weird: Travels in American Subcultures.

== Reception ==
The Age described how "the most compelling stories come from the clients themselves." The Herald described the documentary as "a documentary cliche. How many British filmmakers have been titillated by the fact that prostitution is legal in Nevada?"
