= Harlan Jacobson =

American film critic and scholar (born 1949)

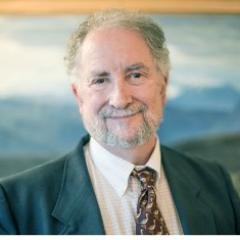
- Born: Harlan Marshall Jacobson; February 15, 1949 (age 77); Cincinnati, Ohio, U.S.
- Education: Haverford College
- Occupations: Film critic, editor
- Notable credit(s): Variety Film Journalist (1973–1980); Film Comment Editor-In-Chief (1982–1990); USA Today correspondent WFUV On-Air Film Critic; WBGO On-Air Film Critic; For the Love of Movies: The Story of American Film Criticism (2009); Manufacturing Dissent (2007)
- Spouse: Susan Jacobson
- Children: 3

Harlan Marshall Jacobson (born February 15, 1949) is an American film critic and scholar.

== Education ==
Harlan Jacobson received a bachelor's degree in English from Haverford College in 1971.

== Career ==
Jacobson has interviewed numerous actors, musicians, directors, and producers over his 30-year career, some of whom include Martin Scorsese, Spike Lee, Steven Spielberg, Francis Ford Coppola, Robin Williams and Mia Farrow.

Jacobson's interview with Michael Moore ("Michael & Me") in the December 1989 edition of Film Comment Magazine for the film Roger & Me sparked an international debate over the methodology of Moore's misrepresentation of then General Motors CEO Roger Smith in the film.

From 1982 to 1990 Harlan Jacobson was the Editor-in-Chief of Film Comment Magazine. He continues to contribute articles and interviews to this day.

Jacobson was a contributing author in Variety's History of Show Business (Abrams, 1993), Jim Jarmusch's Stranger Than Paradise (Univ. Mississippi Press / 2001) as well as Steven Soderbergh's The King of Cannes: Truth or Consequences (Univ. Mississippi Press / 2002).

In 1992, Jacobson and his wife Susan created the national sneak preview and discussion program Talk Cinema, a multi-city film discussion series for film lovers, which has early showings of new films with comments by a local critic and audience participation. Talk Cinema Travels hosts guided tours to international film festivals in Cuba, Iceland, Israel, Spain, California and to a variety of other regional and international festivals.
