= Dog Eat Dog Films =

Production company operated by Michael Moore

- Company type: Film production
- Founded: 1989; 37 years ago
- Founder: Michael Moore
- Headquarters: United States

Dog Eat Dog Films is film director Michael Moore's production company. Dog Eat Dog Films has produced films, television programs, and DVDs. Moore founded Dog Eat Dog Films in 1989.

== Filmography ==
- Roger & Me (1989)
- Pets or Meat: The Return to Flint (1992)
- TV Nation (1994) (TV series)
- Canadian Bacon (1995)
- The Big One (1997)
- The Awful Truth (1999) (TV series)
- Bowling for Columbine (2002)
- Fahrenheit 9/11 (2004)
- Sicko (2007)
- Captain Mike Across America (2007)
- Capitalism: A Love Story (2009)
- Where to Invade Next (2015)
- Michael Moore in TrumpLand (2016)
- Fahrenheit 11/9 (2018)
