= Kevin Rafferty =

American filmmaker (1947–2020)

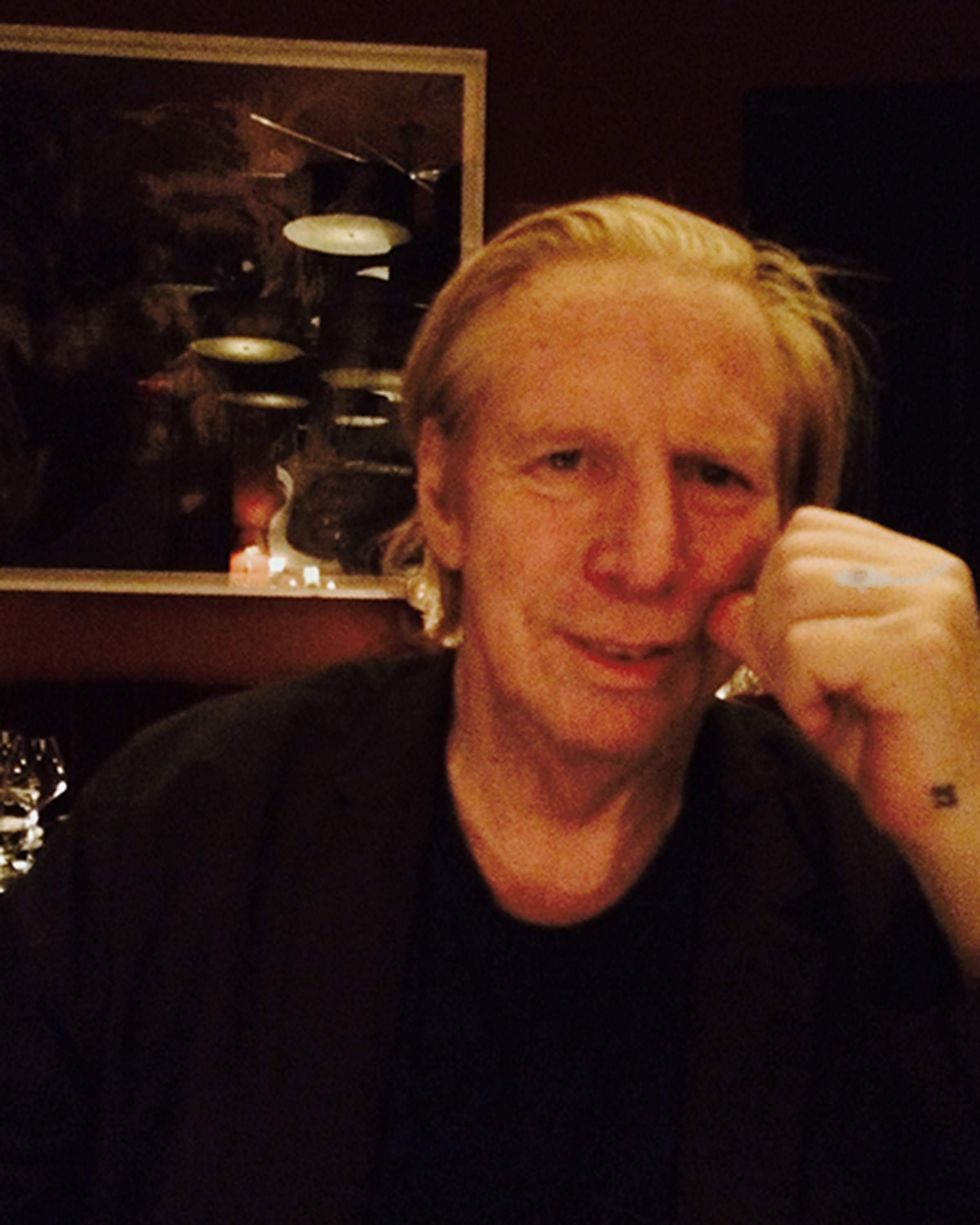
- photo of Kevin Rafferty
- Born: May 25, 1947; Boston, Massachusetts, U.S.
- Died: July 2, 2020 (aged 73); Manhattan, New York City, U.S.
- Occupations: Cinematographer; Film director Film producer
- Known for: Documentary films

Kevin Gelshenen Rafferty II (May 25, 1947 – July 2, 2020) was an American documentary film cinematographer, director, and producer, best known for his 1982 documentary The Atomic Cafe.

== Background ==
Rafferty was born in Boston on May 25, 1947. He studied architecture at Harvard and film at the California Institute of the Arts. He helped teach the craft of filmmaking to Michael Moore during the production of Roger & Me in 1989, and Moore has acknowledged Rafferty's influence on his own filmmaking. Rafferty teamed up with his brother Pierce and Jayne Loader to produce the cult classic documentary film The Atomic Cafe. He was the director, producer, editor, and cinematographer of many documentary projects, including Blood in the Face, The War Room, Feed, and The Last Cigarette. His last project was 2009's Harvard Beats Yale 29-29.

Rafferty was a nephew of Barbara Bush and a cousin of George W. Bush.

Rafferty died from cancer at his home in Manhattan on July 2, 2020, at age 73.

== Filmography ==
=== As director or producer ===
- Hurry Tomorrow (1975)
- The Atomic Cafe (1982)
- Blood in the Face (1991)
- Feed (1992)
- The Last Cigarette (1999)
- Who Wants to Be President? (2000)
- Harvard Beats Yale 29–29 (2008)

=== As cinematographer ===
- Roger & Me (1989)
- The War Room (1993)
- Good Money (1996)

=== As himself ===
- SexTV (2003) (TV)
- Manufacturing Dissent (2007)

== Reception ==
Thom Powers of Harvardwood writes that Rafferty is "renowned for his wit and fresh perspectives on American culture". His various films have received positive reception. Of Hurry Tomorrow, Rafferty's documentary indictment of a California State psychiatric hospital, Colin Bennet of The Age wrote "Its anger and courage are the kind that lead to reform". Michael Atkinson of IFC calls Rafferty's latest, Harvard Beats Yale 29-29, "a hypnotic pleasure," and Fast Company calls it an "engrossing documentary" which was "the best sports film we've seen in years", and Manohla Dargis of New York Times writes "while it seems absurd to include such a picayune event in the annals, the filmmaker Kevin Rafferty makes the case for remembrance and for the art of the story in his preposterously entertaining documentary Harvard Beats Yale 29-29".

The Atomic Cafe had received praise as one of the best Cold War movies of all time.

=== Accolades ===
- 1991, nomination, Grand Jury Prize for Blood in the Face by Sundance Film Festival
- 1983, nomination, Flaherty Documentary Award for Best Documentary for The Atomic Cafe by British Academy of Film and Television Arts
- 2016, The Atomic Cafe selected to the National Film Registry
