= Feed (1992 film) =

- Directed by: Kevin Rafferty; James Ridgeway
- Produced by: Kevin Rafferty; James Ridgeway
- Edited by: Sarah Durham; James Rafferty
- Release date: October 1, 1992
- Running time: 76 minutes
- Country: United States
- Language: English

Feed is a 1992 American political documentary film by Kevin Rafferty and James Ridgeway.

== Summary ==
A raw look at the 1992 Presidential election campaign before and after the TV performances of three candidates: Bill Clinton, George H. W. Bush and Ross Perot.

== Production ==
The film was edited from massive amounts of footage off of satellite feeds provided by Brian Springer who would later put his own spin on the televised political climate of that era in his 1995 documentary Spin.

== Reception ==
The New York Times called it a "revealing look" at the candidates and "as cruel a film as you may ever see", as much of the footage is from television feeds not intended for broadcast.

== See also ==
- Shot-on-video film
- Social effects of television
- The War Room – similar in content
