= F. James McDonald =

American corporate executive (1922–2010)

Francis James McDonald
- Born: August 3, 1922; Saginaw, Michigan
- Died: June 13, 2010 (aged 87); Vero Beach, Florida
- Known for: Contributions to automotive industry

Francis James McDonald (August 3, 1922 – June 13, 2010) was an American engineer and business executive who worked his way up through the ranks at General Motors, ultimately serving as its president and chief operating officer from 1981 to 1987 during the tenure of chairman and chief executive Roger Smith.

== Biography ==
McDonald was born in Saginaw, Michigan on August 3, 1922. He was sponsored by the Saginaw Malleable Iron Division to attend the General Motors Institute in Flint, Michigan, later known as Kettering University, where he combined engineering courses with time spent in the company's foundries. He served in the United States Navy as a submarine engineer during World War II.

After completing his military service, McDonald went back to General Motors in 1946, at the company's Saginaw Malleable Iron plant. There he designed a new kind of conveyor belt for the facility where the company manufactured engine parts. He was named to head the company's foundry in Defiance, Ohio in the mid-1950s and he was named as general manager of the Pontiac division from 1969 to 1972 and then to head the Chevrolet division of GM from 1972 to 1974, both times succeeding John DeLorean.

McDonald was named to GM's board of directors in 1974 and was chosen as its president in 1981. He conceded the failures of the GM X platform and its poor quality profile compared to foreign cars. He oversaw the consolidation of GM's five car divisions into two car-making units, with the goal of streamlining production and improving quality control. The move was criticized for having eliminated the distinctive styling of each of GM's badges and creating similar appearing vehicles. However, the additional bureaucracy and other problems with the plan led to its ultimate dismantling in 1992 by John F. Smith, Jr. He worked with the United Auto Workers to form the UAW-GM Quality Network, a joint effort by management and workers to improve the quality of GM vehicles.

During his tenure, McDonald often disagreed on policy issues with chairman and chief executive Roger Smith, with McDonald focusing on running the business and staying out of the public eye. He stepped down from his post in 1987, having reached GM's mandatory retirement age of 65. Asked for any regrets during his tenure at the automaker, he said he "would make the Eldorado seven inches longer", as his 1985 redesign of the vehicle led to lower sales for the car.

McDonald served on the boards of companies such as Georgia-Pacific, Halliburton, H.J. Heinz and KMart.

McDonald had homes in Harbor Springs, Michigan and Vero Beach, Florida. He died of cancer at age 87 on May 13, 2010, at a hospice in Vero Beach. He was survived by his wife, the former Betty Dettenthaler, as well as by three children, eight grandchildren and five great-grandchildren.

Business positions
Preceded by Pete Estes	President of General Motors; 1981–1987	Succeeded by Robert Stempel
