= Dude, Where's My Country? =

2003 book by Michael Moore

- Cover
- Author: Michael Moore
- Publisher: Warner
- Publication date: 2003
- ISBN: 0-446-53223-1
- OCLC: 53112245
- LC Class: E902 .M65 2003

Dude, Where's My Country? is a 2003 book by Michael Moore dealing with corporate and political events in the United States. The title is a satirical reworking of the 2000 film Dude, Where's My Car?.

The book covers many topics and is written in a heavily satirical fashion, common in much of Moore's work.

== Outline ==
In the book, Moore attacks corporate America and President George W. Bush, whom he accuses of destroying "my America of tolerance and peace". He lashes out against the 2003 Iraq War in particular. The Enron Corporation, and particularly Chairman Ken Lay, also received a lot of attention.

Moore is also critical of the post 9/11 security measures implemented by the Bush administration and Congress, especially the Patriot Act. The frontispiece reads in part:

This book has been approved by the Department of Homeland Security. It contains no seditious acts or acts of treason. Each word has been examined and analyzed by a team of terrorism experts to insure that it gives neither aid nor comfort to The Enemy.... If you have purchased this book we are required to notify you per Section 29A of the USA Patriot Act that your name has now been entered into a database of potential suspects should the need to declare martial law ever arise, which we are sure will never happen.

Topics covered range from who the Democrats should put up for the presidency (Moore proposes Oprah Winfrey or General Wesley Clark, once the Supreme Allied Commander of NATO) right through to "How to talk to your conservative brother-in-law", a guide on how to avoid interpersonal conflicts at Thanksgiving dinner with the family. On page 87, Moore praises Oprah Winfrey for being the only mainstream media personality to show antiwar footage two months before the war that no other U.S. media would show.

Breaking from some on the left, Moore at one point in his book says that "Mumia probably killed that guy". Activists supporting the Black Panther Party's Mumia Abu-Jamal demanded that Moore substantiate this claim. Moore in a later interview stated that he did not believe that Mumia Abu Jamal killed the police officer, and that he would change the passage for the paperback release.

After publishing Stupid White Men, an earlier work, Michael Moore was accused of not providing references to back up his statements. As a response to this, Dude, Where's My Country? includes thorough references.
