= Ben Hamper =

American journalist (born c. 1955)

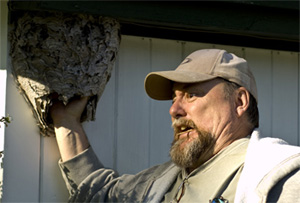
- Hamper at home
- Born: c. 1955 (age 69–70); Flint, Michigan, U.S.
- Occupation: Writer

Bernard Egan "Ben" Hamper (born c. 1955) is a Michigan-based writer. He was born in Flint, Michigan to a family that had many former employees of General Motors amongst its members. Hamper also worked for General Motors in Michigan for several years and wrote for Michael Moore's Flint Voice and Michigan Voice. He has also worked as a correspondent on several of Moore's television projects. In addition to hosting the legendary Take No Prisoners radio show on Flint's WFBE from 1981-1990, Ben also hosted and wrote comedy for Take No Prisoners TV show in Flint. The program aired on local community access and documented the Flint underground music scene from 1989 to 1998, which has been included in its entirety in the Flint Underground Music Archive.

In 2006, Hamper launched a new radio show, Soul Possession, on community radio station WNMC-FM in Traverse City, Michigan. The show focuses on his extensive collection of obscure soul and funk records and can be heard Friday evenings between 8 and 10 pm ET via the station's audio stream. In 2010, Hamper launched another radio show, Head For The Hills, also on WNMC, focusing on his obscure collection of classic and obscure Country records.

His memoir, Rivethead: Tales from the Assembly Line, published in 1991, is an autobiographical account of his life in Flint and subsequent employment on the General Motors assembly line between 1977 and 1988 when he was laid off.

== Television and film ==
Hamper has appeared in a number of high-profile TV and film roles, most notably in association with Michael Moore. In fact Hamper was at Moore's side for most of Moore's career from his very early days to his TV shows in the mid-1990s.

Hamper first began writing articles for the Flint Voice. On the day Moore and Hamper were to meet to discuss Hamper's writing for the Flint Voice, Harry Chapin — a long time benefactor for the paper — was killed in a car accident. Hamper turned around and went home. He did however end up with a writing assignment and rather quickly became a local celebrity who wrote scathing true stories of life on the assembly line. He was kept on when the Flint Voice became the statewide Michigan Voice where he was again one of the more popular writers. When Moore left for Mother Jones in 1986, he brought Hamper over with him and put him on the cover. Moore was fired shortly after. Hamper was asked to keep writing for Mother Jones, but out of loyalty chose not to continue.

When production of Moore's documentary film Roger & Me began in early February 1987, Moore asked Hamper to recall one of his infamous panic attacks stemming from his work at the GM Truck & Bus plant on Van Slyke Road. In the film, Hamper is shown shooting basketball hoops in a parking lot near the former Perry Junior High School in Grand Blanc, MI. After Roger & Me, Hamper's book Rivethead became a national bestseller. He then appeared on the cover of The Wall Street Journal and was interviewed by NBC and CBS for various news shows.

Matt Dillon was tapped to star in the film adaption of Rivethead, with Richard Linklater writing and directing, but the project did not move beyond early stages of development.

In 1995, Hamper had a memorable cameo appearance in Michael Moore's film Canadian Bacon and was later tapped as a correspondent for both TV Nation and The Awful Truth documentary television shows. These were the last official associations with Moore, but the two remain good friends to this day.
