= Michael Moore Live =

American television series

Michael Moore Live, is a 1999 television show featuring political advocate Michael Moore, that ran for one six-part series. It was shown on Channel 4 and aired in the United Kingdom only, though it was broadcast from New York.

The show had a similar format to The Awful Truth but also incorporated phone-ins and a live stunt each week. It was filmed around 7 pm local time, which due to the time difference made it a late-night show in the UK. (EST is five hours behind GMT)

The live phone-ins all featured UK viewers, and questions were mainly about American policy at the time, e.g. gun control and the war in Kosovo. Each week, Moore was joined by guests, and one of the regulars was an illegal UK alien in the USA named Nigel (although his real name was James Horne). Throughout the show, he had to wear a rubber Queen Elizabeth II mask to hide his true identity.
