= Manufacturing Dissent =

- Promotional poster for Manufacturing Dissent
- Directed by: Rick Caine; Debbie Melnyk
- Written by: Rick Caine; Debbie Melnyk
- Produced by: Rick Caine; Debbie Melnyk
- Starring: Rick Caine; Debbie Melnyk
- Production company: Persistence of Vision Productions
- Distributed by: CHUM Pictures (Canada); Liberation Entertainment Inc. (USA & UK)
- Release date: March 10, 2007
- Running time: 96 minutes
- Country: Canada
- Language: English

Manufacturing Dissent: Uncovering Michael Moore is a 2007 documentary film. It puts forward that filmmaker Michael Moore has used misleading tactics, primarily using on-camera statements by interviewees with personal grievances against Moore as proof. The documentary attempts to expose what the creators say are Moore's misleading tactics and mimics Moore's style of small documentary makers seeking and badgering their target for an interview to receive answers to their charges. The film was made over the course of two years by Canadians Debbie Melnyk and Rick Caine after they viewed Fahrenheit 9/11, Moore's controversial film that attacked the Bush administration and its policies. Melnyk and Caine have stated that when they first sought to make a film about Moore, they held great admiration for what he had done for the documentary genre and set out to make a biography of him. During the course of their research, they became disenchanted with Moore's tactics. The title is a parody of the book Manufacturing Consent by Edward S. Herman and Noam Chomsky, and the film it inspired. In June 2007, Liberation Entertainment Inc. signed an exclusive deal with the filmmakers for all video and theatrical rights in the US & UK.

== Criticisms of Moore ==
While Moore depicted an evasive Roger Smith, then Chairman of General Motors, in his breakout documentary Roger & Me, the filmmakers of Manufacturing Dissent allege that Moore spoke with Smith twice. Moore had a lengthy exchange with Smith at a May 1987 GM shareholders meeting yet never included it in his piece. The filmmakers found this shocking, as it appeared to contradict what they say is one of the central premises of Moore's film, that corporate CEOs refuse to answer questions or acknowledge any wrongdoing. Another one of their assertions is that in Moore's Academy Award winning film Bowling for Columbine, Moore misleads the audience in describing the safety Canadians feel in their homes. In the film, Moore goes door-to-door in Sarnia, Ontario testing to see if the front doors are locked or unlocked. Moore edits the film to show every home he tries with an unlocked door. According to Manufacturing Dissent's filmmakers (but not the film itself), Moore's producer for the segment told them that in reality about 40 percent of the homes had unlocked doors.

The film also presents extended footage of the Al Smith annual memorial dinner from which Moore, in Fahrenheit 9/11, took a clip of President George W. Bush greeting the guests as the "haves and have-mores", insinuating that President Bush views the elite upper-class as his constituency, not the average American. The extended footage shows each speaker at the dinner poking fun at himself, including a clip of Al Gore joking that he invented the Internet. It is argued that the extended footage shows Moore to have taken the quote from President Bush out of context.

The filmmakers were unable to land their sit-down interview with Moore, just as Moore said he was unable to have done with Roger Smith in Roger & Me. They assert their attempts to interview Moore were consistently dodged and obstructed by Moore and the people surrounding him.

== Reception ==
Moore rejected allegations he successfully managed to interview Roger Smith and then left that footage on the cutting room floor, telling the Associated Press: "Anyone who says that is a fucking liar." The filmmaker accepted having had a "good five minutes of back-and-forth" with Smith about a tax abatement issue after ambushing him at a shareholders' meeting in 1987, but maintained this specific questioning occurred before work began on Roger & Me and was not connected to the film. "Any exchange with Roger Smith would have been valuable," said Moore, before suggesting that if he truly had landed an interview with Smith during production and then suppressed the footage, General Motors would have publicized the details to discredit him. "I'm so used to listening to the stuff people say about me, it just becomes entertainment for me at this point. It's a fictional character that's been created with the name of Michael Moore."

Progressive documentary maker John Pilger wrote that, far from being an impartial portrait of the filmmaker, Manufacturing Dissent "appears to have been timed to discredit, if not Sicko, then Moore himself", assailing him "with a blunderbuss of assertions and hearsay".

The film received mixed reviews from film critics. Rotten Tomatoes gave it a score of 54% based on 24 reviews.

== Promotion ==
Melnyk and Caine were invited to appear on a number of Fox News programs to discuss the film. They accepted an invitation to the show The Live Desk, with Martha MacCallum, fearing that their comments would be edited if they appeared on a taped program. When the pair refused to direct their criticism solely at Michael Moore, but also at mainstream U.S. media and George W. Bush, the interview was cut short. Caine told the Canadian Press, "I could hear a person in New York screaming into my earpiece: 'Get that asshole off the air.' They cut us off."

== See also ==
- Michael Moore Hates America
- Sicko
- Capitalism: A Love Story
- Corporatism
- Lobbying
