= Blood in the Face =

1991 American documentary film

- Film poster
- Directed by: Anne Bohlen; Kevin Rafferty; James Ridgeway
- Written by: James Ridgeway
- Starring: George Lincoln Rockwell; Don Black; Thom Robb; Jack Moher; Michael Moore; Allen Poe; Bob Miles; Glenn Miller
- Distributed by: First Run Features
- Release date: 1991
- Running time: 78 minutes
- Country: United States
- Language: English

Blood in the Face is a 1991 documentary film about white supremacy groups in North America and was directed by Anne Bohlen, Kevin Rafferty and James Ridgeway. It features many interviews with various white supremacist leaders, and archival footage of others.

== Synopsis ==
It focuses on a gathering of neo-Nazis, racists, and conspiracy theorists who expect people of color to ignite a Racial Holy War in the U.S. The white supremacists who have assembled for lectures and workshops on everything from getting their message out via home videos to moving all like-minded "white Christians" to the Pacific Northwest, especially the Idaho Panhandle. It is mostly built around a gathering around white supremacist Robert E. Miles.

It gives a background on the life of George Lincoln Rockwell, the American Nazi Party, who is influential on many of the movements portrayed in the documentary. Rockwell is portrayed with archival footage.

== Background ==
Blood in the Face was inspired by a nonfiction book of the same name by author James Ridgeway, also one of the film's directors. This documentary was largely shot in Cohoctah Township, Michigan.

According to the audio commentary on the Roger & Me DVD, American filmmaker Michael Moore appears as an off-screen interviewer because he was originally contacted to arrange a meeting between the filmmakers and the supremacists since he had previously interviewed them for a magazine. At the last minute, the filmmakers backed out of the interview and Moore stepped in to conduct it. Moore is thanked in the end credits. Michael Moore does appear on camera during one interview, and can be heard during another interview.

== Release ==
Blood in the Face was not rated. The film's title refers to the red flush sometimes present in the skin of people of European descent, particularly an idea held by some in the documentary that only white people can blush.

The film's release was controversial, with criticism from the left-wing for failing to criticize what it portrayed sufficiently. The neo-Nazis portrayed in the film were excited that the film was being made by an established left-wing journalist instead of one of them, as it allowed their message to have a higher reach. One reviewer noted the implication by one individual in the film that they were allowing themselves to be exploited to let their message reach a wider audience.

== Reception ==
Rita Kempley of The Washington Post described the film as more of "a sociological sideshow than a documentary of bigotry", saying that it did not offer an explanation of the beliefs of anyone portrayed, just that it "focuses the lens". Vincent Canby, a reviewer for The New York Times, called it "first-rate journalism".

Chris Hicks, reviewing the film for Deseret News, called the title "apt", since "it sounds like a horror movie. And make no mistake — this is definitely a horror movie." He called some of what was portrayed in the film "laughable in their lunacy" but argued there was "no question that the cavalier attitude of those interviewed and the pride with which they state their positions is frightening".
