= Roger & Me =

1989 film by Michael Moore

- Theatrical release poster
- Directed by: Michael Moore
- Written by: Michael Moore
- Produced by: Michael Moore
- Starring: Michael Moore; Roger B. Smith; Janet Rauch; Rhonda Britton; Fred Ross; Ronald Reagan; Bob Eubanks
- Narrated by: Michael Moore
- Cinematography: Chris Beaver; John Prusak; Kevin Rafferty; Bruce Schermer
- Edited by: Jennifer Beman; Wendey Stanzler
- Production company: Dog Eat Dog Films
- Distributed by: Warner Bros.
- Release date: December 20, 1989
- Running time: 90 minutes
- Country: United States
- Language: English
- Budget: $140,000
- Box office: $6.7 million

Roger & Me is a 1989 American documentary film written, produced, directed by, and starring Michael Moore, in his directorial debut. Moore portrays the regional economic impact of General Motors CEO Roger Smith's action of closing several auto plants in his hometown of Flint, Michigan, reducing GM's employees in that area from 80,000 in 1978 to about 50,000 in 1992.

The film won the People's Choice Award at the 14th Toronto International Film Festival.

In 2013, the film was selected for preservation in the United States National Film Registry by the Library of Congress as being "culturally, historically or aesthetically significant".

== Synopsis ==
Moore begins by introducing himself and his family through 8 mm archival home movies; he describes himself as the Irish American Catholic middle-class son of a General Motors employee assembling AC spark plugs. Moore chronicles how GM had previously defined his childhood in Flint, Michigan, and how the company was the primary economic and social hub of the town. He points out that Flint is the place where the Flint sit-down strike occurred, resulting in the birth of the United Auto Workers. He reveals that his heroes were the Flint natives who had escaped the oppressive life in GM's factories, including "Flint's most famous native son," game show host Bob Eubanks. Eubanks is later interviewed in the film while preparing to do a stage version of "The Newlywed Game," which sees him tell an off-color joke about Jewish women.

Initially, Moore achieves his dream of avoiding blue-collared factory life after being hired by Mother Jones magazine in San Francisco, but this venture fails for him and he ultimately travels back to Flint. As he returns (in 1986), GM announces the layoffs of thousands of Flint auto workers, whose jobs will be outsourced to cheaper, non-unionized labor in Mexico. GM makes this announcement even though the company is achieving record profits.

Disguised as a TV journalist, Moore interviews some auto workers in Flint and discovers their strong disgust for GM chairman Roger B. Smith. Moore begins seeking out Smith himself to confront him about the closing of the Flint plants. He repeatedly tries to visit Smith at the GM headquarters in Detroit, yet he is blocked by building security. Over the course of the film, Moore attempts to track down Smith at the Grosse Pointe Yacht Club and the Detroit Athletic Club, only to be told either that Smith is not there or to leave by employees and security guards.

From there, Moore begins to explore the emotional impact of the plant closings on his friends. He interviews Ben Hamper, an auto worker who suffered a nervous breakdown on the assembly line and is residing at a mental health facility. Moore also talks to the residents of the affluent suburb of Grand Blanc, who display classist attitudes about Flint's hardships.

Moore changes course and turns his camera on the Flint Convention and Visitors Bureau, which promotes a vigorously incompetent tourism policy. The bureau, in an effort to lure tourists into visiting Flint, permits the construction of a Hyatt Regency Hotel, a festival marketplace called Water Street Pavilion, and AutoWorld, hailed as the world's largest indoor theme park. All these efforts fail, as the Hyatt files for bankruptcy and is put up for sale, Water Street Pavilion sees most of its stores go out of business and AutoWorld closes six months after opening.

High-profile people are shown coming to Flint to bring hope to the unemployed, some of them interviewed by Moore. President Ronald Reagan visits the town and suggests that the unemployed auto workers find work by moving across the country, though the restaurant he visits has its cash register stolen during the event (off-camera). Pat Boone and Anita Bryant, who have supplied GM with celebrity endorsements, also come to town; Boone tells Moore that Smith is an "optimistic, can-do" kind of guy.

Moore attends the annual GM shareholder meeting, disguised as a shareholder himself. However, when he gets a turn at the microphone to air his grievances to the board, Smith appears to recognize Moore and immediately shuts him out and has the convention adjourned, despite Moore's attempts to interrupt him. Meanwhile, Moore meets and interviews more residents of Flint, who are reeling from the economic fallout of the layoffs. A former feminist radio host, Janet, joins Amway as a saleswoman to find work. Another resident, Rhonda Britton, sells rabbits for "Pets or Meat." Prevalent throughout the film is Sheriff's Deputy Fred Ross, a former factory worker whose current job now demands that he go around town carrying out record numbers of evictions on families unable to pay their rent.

During all of this, Flint's crime rate skyrockets, with shootouts and murders becoming much more common. Crime becomes so prevalent that when the ABC News program Nightline tries to do a live story on the plant closings, someone steals the network's van (along with the cables), abruptly stopping the broadcast. The county jail also fills to its maximum capacity of inmates, and a second jail is built due to the over-crowding. Living in Flint becomes so desperate that Money magazine ranks the city as the worst place to live in America.

At the film's climax, Moore finally confronts Smith at the chairman's annual 1988 Christmas message in Detroit. Smith is shown expounding about generosity during the holiday season as Deputy Ross evicts another family from their home. After Smith's speech, Moore confronts Smith, telling him about current evictions and asking him to come to Flint, but Smith declines.

After the credits, the film displays the message "This film cannot be shown within the city of Flint," followed by "All the movie theatres have closed."

== Production ==
Moore decided to make the film after losing his job as the editor of Mother Jones and moving back to his former home town of Flint, Michigan, as it was suffering from deindustrialization due to General Motors' layoffs. After his attempt to restart his Flint Voice newspaper faltered, Moore decided to make a documentary on the city's economic crisis. Initially, he intended to make it under the title The Moores and the Motts, contrasting his working-class family with the upper-class family descended from Charles Stewart Mott, but later shifted focus to the current U.S. automobile industry. Moore intended the film as a personal statement condemning not just GM but also the economic policies and social attitudes of the Reagan era, which he felt allowed corporations to remove the largest source of income from an entire town.

At the time Moore decided to make the documentary in 1984, he had no experience in filmmaking or funds to produce the film. To get the money, he filed a successful wrongful termination lawsuit against Mother Jones for $160,000. He also mortgaged his house, sold most of his belongings, and arranged a three-year series of weekly bingo games to raise the remainder of the film's $200,000 budget. He also began teaching himself film technique, spending hours at local cinemas. Eventually Moore received grant awards from the J. Roderick MacArthur Foundation, the Channel Four Television Corporation, the Michigan Council for the Arts, and Ralph Nader. The Mackinac Center donated $5,000 to the film but later requested it to be refunded. Nader also requested that the $30,000 he donated to the production be returned. He claimed that the nonprofit group Essential Information had donated the funds with the understanding that Moore would start a newsletter that never operated, and an associate of Nader's accused Moore of drawing ideas for Roger & Me from Nader's book The Big Boys.

Roger & Me was filmed under the working title A Humorous Look at How General Motors Destroyed Flint, Michigan. Moore and his crew decided after viewing a 15-minute bumper from the film that the depiction of mass unemployment would be too depressing for mainstream audiences, and decided to give it a humorous slant. Production began on February 11, 1987, on the 50th anniversary of the Flint sit-down strike. A large proportion of the filming was done in a 60-day period during the summer of 1988. Moore obtained interviews by pretending to be filming University of Michigan videos on poverty or booster films promoting the city. The production concluded in August 1989.

Moore was mentored during the production by documentarians Christopher Beaver, Anne Bohlen, Judy Irving, and Kevin Rafferty. Moore had previously assisted on Bohlen and Rafferty's film Blood in the Face.

=== Release ===
The film had its worldwide premiere at the Toronto International Film Festival in September 1989. It was well received by the Canadian audience with it winning the coveted TIFF People's Choice Award. Coincidentally, only a few weeks later, GM would announce the closing of their Toronto truck assembly plant, moving vehicle production to a plant in Flint, Michigan.

Moore briefly entered negotiations with Disney to distribute the film, meeting with CEO Michael Eisner. Warner Bros. gave Moore $3 million for distribution license, a very large amount for a first-time filmmaker and (at the time) unprecedented for any documentary. Part of the distribution deal required Warner Bros. to pay $25,000 in rent for two years for the families evicted in the film. Moore also donated 20,000 free tickets to unemployed Americans, stipulated that between 30 and 40 percent of his and the producers' profits would be donated to a new non-profit foundation supporting similar political documentaries.

To promote the film's planned national release in 965 theaters, Moore and the film's crew toured 65 GM plants around the country making demands such as a visit by Smith to Flint. During the film's marketing campaign, GM and some commentators challenged the veracity of the film's claims. GM refused to allow advertisements to its automobiles to play during television programs promoting the film, including an episode of The Phil Donahue Show filmed live at the Whiting Auditorium and an episode of The Tonight Show Starring Johnny Carson featuring Moore as a guest. After Moore's appearance, GM's media relations chief Bill Ott mailed guest host Jay Leno a packet of news articles challenging his claims.

The film premiered in Flint on December 19, 1989, and was released in New York City and Los Angeles one day later. It went on to become America's most successful documentary in its theatrical run and enjoyed wide critical acclaim, earning $12 million. Moore used $1 million of the film's gross to donate to charities such as the National Union of the Homeless, Earth First!, the Jewish Women's Coalition to End the Occupation, and the United Auto Workers faction New Directions. He also allocated $10,000 to rent payments or homeless shelters around Flint, and $20,000 to revive the Flint Voice.

Despite its success, the film was not nominated for the Academy Award for Best Documentary Feature in 1990. The film's lack of a nomination was controversial; on the night of the 62nd Academy Awards, Moore attended a ceremony arranged by homelessness activists across the street which presented him with a "People's Award". Three years later, an anonymous member of the Academy of Motion Picture Arts and Sciences confirmed to the Los Angeles Times that the film was deliberately not nominated because the documentary committee believed it was "dishonest and unfair to its subjects".

=== Reaction to the film ===
Despite the company's public opposition to the film, its humorous and out-of-touch portrayal of Smith made it widely popular inside GM. By the time of the film's release, GM had lost 8% of its market share and was taking on significant financial losses, leading many employees and executives to become disillusioned with Smith's leadership.

By the time the film was released, Flint was making a slight economic recovery in which unemployment, violent crime, and the local government's budget deficit declined. As a result, many commentators questioned the veracity of the film, accusing Moore of falsifying or embellishing details.

Larry Stecco, a lifetime Flint area resident and personal injury lawyer, discussed positive aspects of Flint (such as the local ballet and hockey) at a Great Gatsby-themed fundraiser. Stecco, who was filmed in front of two African-Americans posing as human statues, alleged that the film's unflattering portrayal of him had been unfair. Stecco filed a lawsuit against Moore and Warner Bros, claiming that Moore had falsely told him he was making a booster film for Flint's local PBS affiliate. After reviewing outtakes from the film, a jury sided with Stecco and ordered Moore to pay $6,250. Moore later expressed satisfaction with the decision since the slander charges were dismissed and because the settlement was less than the sought-after $50,000.

=== Legacy ===
Moore allowed the film to be aired on television for the first time as part of the PBS series P.O.V. in 1992. The broadcast included a new short documentary by Moore called Pets or Meat: The Return to Flint (1992), which served as a new epilogue. In this film, Moore returns to Flint two years after the release of Roger & Me to see what changes have taken place. Moore revisits Flint and its economic decline again in later films, including The Big One, Bowling for Columbine, Fahrenheit 9/11, Fahrenheit 11/9, and Capitalism: A Love Story. In 2013, the film was selected for preservation in the National Film Registry by the Library of Congress for being "culturally, historically, and aesthetically significant."

== Critical reception ==
The film received overwhelmingly positive reviews from critics. Film critic Emanuel Levy called the film "scathingly funny" and likened it to the works of Mark Twain. Gene Siskel and Roger Ebert both put the film on their lists of The 10 Best Films of 1989.

In contrast, Pauline Kael felt the film exaggerated the social impact of GM's closing of the plant and depicted the actual events of Flint's troubles out of chronological order. Kael called the film "shallow and facetious, a piece of gonzo demagoguery that made me feel cheap for laughing". One such criticism is that the eviction at the end of the film occurred on a different day from Smith's speech, but the two events were intercut for emotional effect. Filmmaker Emile de Antonio was also claimed to be critical of the film. Ebert defended the film from those who criticized it for exaggerations and inaccuracies, writing that in the film, Moore "was taking the liberties that satirists and ironists have taken with material for generations, and he was making his point with sarcasm and deft timing."

In 2007 during the promotion of Moore's documentary Sicko, a documentary was released named Manufacturing Dissent: Uncovering Michael Moore, which featured a clip of a question-and-answer exchange between Moore and Smith at a 1987 GM shareholders' meeting it alleged had been filmed for but not included in Roger & Me. Moore acknowledged the encounter (described by the Associated Press as "about a company tax abatement, as reported by Premiere magazine in 1990") but claimed it pre-dated the start of his work on the film and had nothing to do with it, and argued that had he omitted footage of an interview with Smith GM would have used it to discredit the film. In a 2014 oral history compiled by MLive to commemorate the film's 25th anniversary, the film's cinematographer Bruce Schermer recalled of the interview that Moore “Probably gave him 10 questions", “mainly what's the plan for Flint and how many jobs are going to be lost,” and that “Roger Smith couldn't give him the final answer and maybe he didn't want to. He gave pretty boring answers. He was as honest as he was going to be.”

Critic Billy Stevenson described the film as Moore's "most astonishing", arguing it represents an effort to conflate film-making and labor, and that "it's this fusion of film-making and work that allows Moore to fully convey the desecration of Flint without ever transforming it into a sublime or melancholy poverty-spectacle, thereby distancing himself from the retouristing of the town-as-simulacrum that occupies the last and most intriguing part of the film". Eubanks later described Moore as not a documentarian but a "propagandist".

On the review aggregator website Rotten Tomatoes, 100% of 30 critics' reviews are positive, with an average rating of 8.9/10.

== Awards ==
The film would go on to win over 14 awards in the years since its release including:

Year	Festival – Organization	Award – Category
1989	Toronto International Film Festival	People's Choice Award
1989	Vancouver International Film Festival	Most Popular Film
1989	New York Film Critics Circle Awards	Best Documentary
1989	National Board of Review	Best Documentary

== See also ==
- Pets or Meat: The Return to Flint
- Final Offer – a documentary film that shows the backroom 1984 General Motors contract negotiations that would result in the union split of the Canadian arm of the UAW. It also shows how the UAW was more willing to negotiate with General Motors than their Canadian counterparts. The film depicts some of the events that would lead to the closing of plants in Flint and other plants around the United States. GM Chairman Roger Smith is featured in the film.
- The Corporation – a 2003 Canadian documentary film that shows the history of the corporation and some of its potential downfalls. Michael Moore appears in the film.
