= Robert Stempel =

General Motors executive

- Born: Robert Carl Stempel; July 15, 1933; Trenton, New Jersey, US
- Died: May 7, 2011 (aged 77); West Palm Beach, Florida, US
- Education: Worcester Polytechnic; Institute (BS); Michigan State University (MBA)
- Occupations: Engineer, Automobile executive
- Known for: Engineer, CEO of General Motors

Robert Carl Stempel (July 15, 1933 – May 7, 2011) was chairman and CEO of General Motors (GM) from August 1990 to November 1992. He joined GM in 1958 as a design engineer at Oldsmobile and was key in the development of the front-wheel drive Toronado. He was also involved with the team that created the first catalytic converter.

== Background and personal life ==
Stempel was born July 15, 1933, in Trenton, New Jersey, to Carl (a banker) and Eleanor Stempel. He was one of four children. His brother Jack worked in aerospace, brother Ted was a teacher, and a sister, Dorothy, was a social worker.

He graduated from Bloomfield High School in New Jersey in 1951. During his teen years, he worked as a mechanic in Bloomfield, New Jersey, to earn his college tuition by fixing his fellow students' cars. He received a bachelor of science degree in mechanical engineering from Worcester Polytechnic Institute in 1955 where he had been a tackle on the football team. He attended night classes and earned an MBA from Michigan State University in 1970 and later received an honorary doctorate from Worcester Polytechnic Institute.

Stempel was a member of the National Academy of Engineering, the Society of Automotive Engineers, the American Society of Mechanical Engineers, and the Engineering Society of Detroit. He was the first chairman of the American Quality Foundation, developed by the American Society for Quality Control. He was a member of the board of directors and chairman of the National Industrial Advisory Council to the Opportunities Industrialization Centers of America, Inc.; the National Minority Supplier Development Council; and the Motor Vehicle Manufacturers Association; the Highway Users Federation and the United Way of Southeastern Michigan. He was a member of Detroit's Conference Board, The Business Roundtable, and The Business Council and he was a trustee of Worcester Polytechnic Institute, Detroit Renaissance, and New Detroit, Inc.

In November 1975, Stempel's son Timothy, 13, had been kidnapped. Stempel received a ransom demand of $150,000, which he paid. His son was later freed and kidnappers were apprehended and convicted.

Stempel enjoyed attending auto races and motorsports events, and working on his cars, including his 1974 Corvette. He also enjoyed skiing and surf-casting. Prior to his death, the Stempels lived and raised horses in Loxahatchee, Florida, and Oxford, Michigan.

Stempel died in West Palm Beach, Florida, on May 7, 2011, at the age of 77. With his wife Pat (née Patricia Bachmann), he had three children, a daughter Barbara and sons Timothy and Peter.

== Early career at General Motors ==
After serving two years in the U.S. Army Corps of Engineers, Stempel joined GM's Oldsmobile Division as a senior detailer in the chassis design department in 1958, later serving as senior designer (1962); transmission design engineer (1964); motor engineer (1969); and assistant chief engineer (1972). Stempel subsequently worked on the team that developed the 1966 Toronado, the first modern American front-wheel-drive car. According to a GM biography, Stempel designed the Toronado's front suspension and its engine and transmission mounting system.

Stempel joined the engineering department of the Chevrolet Division as chief engineer in 1974 and was named Chevrolet's director of engineering in 1975. In 1978, Stempel was appointed general manager of the Pontiac Motor Division where he worked on the Fiero – which used a plastic-body/space frame technology that became integral to GM's subsequent minivans and the Saturn lineup. In 1980, he was moved into the managing director position at Adam Opel AG, the German subsidiary of GM. In 1982, he returned to Detroit as general manager of Chevrolet.

In January 1984, he was promoted to the dual responsibility of vice president and group executive in charge of the Buick-Oldsmobile-Cadillac group. He was elected to the board of directors (February, 1986) and became CEO (August, 1990) where he served until he was voted out in 1992 – shortly after a recession when GM had closed a dozen plants, lost 74,000 jobs and lost $7 billion.

Though he suffered a heart attack soon after leaving GM in 1992, Stempel continued to visit the North American International Auto Show and continued to maintain his interest and passion for automobiles and the automobile industry.

== Later career ==
In 1993, Stempel joined Stanford Ovshinsky, founder of Energy Conversion Devices (ECD) as an adviser. Stempel was named chairman in 1995.

Shortly after Stempel became chairman, ECD partnered engineered and provided the nickel-metal hydride batteries powered the EV-1. In 1999, ECD partnered with Intel in a joint-venture called Ovonyx which developed nonsilicon-based memory for electronic devices for Intel, Samsung Electronics and BAE Systems. Subsequently, ECD formed joint ventures with Texaco Energy Systems Inc., GE Plastics and Belgium-based N.V. Bekaert S.A. The promising technologies were met with losses. Before retiring in 2007, Stempel was chairman of Energy Conversion for almost 12 years.

Ovshinsky called Stempel "a visionary who saw the need for the U.S. to be independent of foreign oil." Before retiring in 2007, Stempel was chairman of Energy Conversion for almost 12 years.

At the time of his death, Stempel served on the board of directors of Envia Systems, a Newark, California-based company that provided GM's battery engineering team with access to advanced lithium-ion cathode technology delivering higher cell energy density and lower cost. In March 2010, he joined the board of directors of Genesis Fluid Solutions Holdings, a water purification company in Colorado Springs, Colorado.

Business positions
Preceded by Roger B. Smith	Chairman of General Motors; 1990–1992	Succeeded by John G. Smale
Preceded by Roger B. Smith	CEO of General Motors; 1990–1992	Succeeded by John F. Smith Jr.
Preceded by F. James McDonald	President of General Motors; 1987–1990	Succeeded by Lloyd E. Reuss
