= The Big One (film) =

- Theatrical release poster
- Directed by: Michael Moore
- Written by: Michael Moore
- Produced by: Kathleen Glynn
- Starring: Michael Moore
- Narrated by: Michael Moore
- Cinematography: Brian Danitz; Chris Smith
- Edited by: Meg Reticker
- Music by: World Famous Blue Jays
- Production companies: BBC Production; Dog Eat Dog Films; Mayfair Entertainment
- Distributed by: Miramax Films
- Release dates: September 6, 1997 (Toronto International Film Festival); April 10, 1998 (theatrical)
- Running time: 91 minutes
- Language: English
- Box office: $720,074

The Big One is a 1997 documentary film written and directed by documentarian filmmaker and activist Michael Moore, and released by Miramax Films. The film documents Moore during his tour promoting his 1996 book Downsize This! around the United States. Through the 47 towns he visits, Moore discovers and describes American economic failings and the fear of unemployment of American workers.

== Background ==
Harvey Weinstein of Miramax bought the distribution rights to The Big One after viewing a screening of the film at the Toronto International Film Festival, promising to dedicate 50 percent of the film's income to the Flint, Michigan agencies named in the film.

== Synopsis ==
Much of the film features Moore unsuccessfully chasing the heads and chief executives of major corporations around the US in order to confront them or conduct a personal in-depth interview. He is eventually able to talk with Phil Knight at Nike. The film criticizes President Bill Clinton, and other major candidates in the 1996 presidential election, for failure to address economic issues. It discusses Clinton's betrayal of progressive economic ideals.

== Reception ==
On the review aggregator website Rotten Tomatoes, 92% of 38 critics' reviews are positive.
