= Spin (1995 film) =

- Directed by: Brian Springer
- Written by: Brian Springer
- Starring: Al Gore; Bill Clinton; Barbara Bush; George H. W. Bush; Pat Robertson; Larry Agran
- Narrated by: Brian Springer
- Release date: 1995
- Running time: 56 minutes
- Language: English

Spin is a 1995 documentary film by Brian Springer composed of raw satellite feeds featuring politicians' pre-appearance planning. It covers the presidential election as well as the 1992 Los Angeles riots and the Operation Rescue abortion protests. Spin is a follow-up to the 1992 film Feed, for which Springer provided much of the raw satellite footage.

== Summary ==
Among other things, the film captured an 'open mic' discussion between Larry King and George Bush about sleeping pills, King talking about how he "changed the world", and Pat Robertson making homophobic comments in-between takes.

The film also documents behind-the-scenes footage of Larry Agran, who unsuccessfully sought the Democratic Party nomination for president. As covered in the documentary, the media generally ignored Agran during his candidacy. The media did not report his polling numbers, even as he met or exceeded the support of other candidates, such as Jerry Brown. Party officials excluded him from most debates on various grounds, even having him arrested when he interrupted to ask to participate. When he managed to join the other candidates in any forum, his ideas went unreported. He was excluded in photographs with other candidates.

== Reception ==
Stephen Holden of The New York Times described the film as "a devastating critique of television's profound manipulativeness in how it packages the news and politics".

== See also ==
- Media manipulation
- Propaganda
- Spin (propaganda)
