= Thomas Murphy (chairman) =

American businessman (1915–2006)

Thomas A. Murphy
- Born: Thomas Aquinas Murphy; December 10, 1915; Hornell, New York, U.S.
- Died: January 18, 2006 (aged 90); Boynton Beach, Florida, U.S.
- Resting place: Calvary Cemetery, Queens, New York
- Education: Accounting (B.S.)
- Alma mater: University of Illinois
- Occupation: Manager
- Board member of: General Motors
- Spouse: Catherine Rita Murphy
- Children: 3

Thomas Aquinas Murphy (December 10, 1915 – January 18, 2006) was former CEO of General Motors during the 1970s.

== Personal life ==
Thomas Aquinas Murphy was born on December 10, 1915, in Hornell, New York. He attended Leo Catholic High School in Chicago, Illinois.

Murphy died in Boynton Beach, Florida, on January 18, 2006. He is buried at Calvary Cemetery in Queens, New York. Murphy was married for 64 years to Catherine Rita Murphy; their union produced two daughters and a son.

== Career ==
Murphy began with GM as a clerk in the controller's office after graduating in 1938 from the University of Illinois with a B.S. in accountancy. During World War II, Murphy served in the Navy for three years before returning to work for GM. He moved up the ranks from controller's office, from finance executive:

- VP of car and truck operations
- VP of GM 1972-1974

He retired from GM as chairman and chief executive in 1980. He continued serving on GM's Board of Directors from 1980 to 1988.

His time at GM was when the automaker was still global leader with a record of 9.55 million cars and trucks sold globally (1978). The impact of the oil embargo in the late 1970s hit GM hard, as well as new policy on safety and regulation. GM remained profitable in the 1980s until Japanese imports began to up the production and lowered costs. In 2005, GM sold 9.17 million vehicles, the first time since 1978.

He is credited with saying "General Motors is not in the business of making cars. It is in the business of making money."

Business positions
Preceded by Richard C. Gerstenberg	Chairman of General Motors; 1974 – 1980	Succeeded by Roger B. Smith
Preceded by Richard C. Gerstenberg	CEO of General Motors; 1974 – 1980	Succeeded by Roger B. Smith
