= WNMC-FM =

Coordinates: 44.777°N 85.684°W

- Traverse City, Michigan; United States
- Frequency: 90.7 MHz

Programming
- Format: Public: Variety

Ownership
- Owner: Northwestern Michigan College

History
- First air date: 1967
- Call sign meaning: Northwestern Michigan College

Technical information
- Licensing authority: FCC
- Class: A
- ERP: 600 watts

Links
- Public license information: Public file; LMS
- Webcast: wnmc.m3u wnmc.asx wnmc.pls wnmc48.m3u wnmc48.asx wnmc48.pls
- Website: http://www.wnmc.org

WNMC-FM (90.7 FM) is a public radio station in Traverse City, Michigan, and is licensed to the trustees of Northwestern Michigan College (NMC). The station has block programming, mostly jazz and blues during the daytime, Americana in the late afternoon, and rock programming at night, but also features alternative country, world music, and electronica.

== History ==
The first use of WNMC traces back to Northern Michigan University, then called Northern Michigan College, in 1960. The first WNMC was a carrier-current student station, and was replaced by WNMU-FM, which went on the air in 1963 and adopted the NMU distinction when the university changed the name that same year.

WNMC in Traverse City began life in 1967 as a student organization broadcasting to the dormitories at NMC, also as a carrier-current station. The move to become an FM station was started by NMC students in 1976, and in 1979, WNMC made its FM debut at 90.9, broadcasting at a mere 10 watts. In 1981, WNMC boosted power again to 150 watts, covering Traverse City and approximately six miles radius of surrounding territory.

In 1997, WNMC boosted their power once more to 600 watts and moved to its current frequency, 90.7. The station now broadcasts from the relay tower of WPBN-TV 7 & 4, Traverse City's NBC station.. The station is supported by listener donations and business underwriting. Northwestern Michigan College supplies bookkeeping and fundraising as well as studio and office space, currently in the Timoth J. Nelson Innovation Center on the NMC main campus.

== Staff ==
WNMC is staffed mostly with community volunteers, as well as NMC students, and broadcasts 24 hours per day. Ben Hamper author of Rivethead currently hosts two programs on the station: Soul Possession (soul & funk), and Head for the Hills (hillbilly obscurities). Astronomer, NASA Ambassador, and former station manager Michael Foerster hosts a science feature on the Friday morning show.. The station's only employee is General Manager Eric Hines. Hines was a journalist prior to being recruited for the position, with previous experience in radio was with WRSU-FM on the station's radio council.

== Programming ==
WNMC broadcasts a wide variety of music, most of it otherwise unavailable on the radio dial in its service area. Jazz, blues, alternative rock, folk, world music and local music are primary areas of concentration. Specialty shows feature new age, alternative country, African, Latin American, and a host of other style and genres. The station's schedule is available here, and both archived and current playlists can be accessed through WNMC's Spinitron page.

== See also ==
- List of community radio stations in the United States
