= Pets or Meat: The Return to Flint =

1992 film by Michael Moore

Pets or Meat
- Directed by: Michael Moore
- Written by: Michael Moore
- Produced by: Lydia Dean Pilcher; Michael Moore
- Starring: Michael Moore; Rhonda Britton; Janet K. Rauch
- Release date: September 28, 1992
- Running time: 23 minutes
- Language: English

Pets or Meat: The Return to Flint is a 1992 American short PBS documentary film written, co-produced and directed by Michael Moore, featuring the director returning to his hometown of Flint, Michigan, to catch-up with some of the characters featured in his previous film Roger & Me (1989). The film's title refers to Rhonda Britton, a Flint resident featured in both films, who sells rabbits as either pets or meat.

== Synopsis ==
Britton, the so-called Bunny Lady, "grossed out millions by skinning a soft furry creature in the first film, tops her original performance. Her newest venture, designed to supplement her garnished K-mart wages, is raising mice and rabbits as snake food. This time, Moore's critique of modern capitalism features footage of a huge snake devouring another fluffy pet."

In an earlier interview for Roger & Me, Moore explained the meaning of "pets or meat" in his own words: "That's the town. Either you're working or you're meat. That's GM's attitudes toward its serfs. The clubbing and skinning of the rabbit stands for the violence. Why aren't people upset by the violence of a black man getting shot two minutes later in the film? Why are there walkouts during the rabbit section, but not during the shooting? That's the image they're used to, but they eat their meat every night."

The documentary opens with the warning: "The following program contains scenes of explicit corporate behavior which may be offensive to young children, vegetarians and General Motors shareholders. Viewer discretion is advised." It closed with the following disclaimer: "No animals were harmed in the making of this film, though some were well fed."

== Cast ==
- Michael Moore
- Rhonda Britton
- Janet K. Rauch

== Reception ==
John Koch of The Boston Globe notes, "if you're disturbed by the graphic scene of a snake crushing the life out of a rabbit, you should be more upset, the director is saying not too subtly, by the constricted lives of out-of-work, under-served human beings."
