= Downsize This! =

1996 book by Michael Moore

Downsize This! Random Threats from an Unarmed American
- First edition
- Author: Michael Moore
- Language: English
- Publisher: Pan Books
- Publication date: September 1996; September 17, 1997 (Reprint); November 29, 2002 (Reprint)
- Media type: Paperback
- Pages: 224
- ISBN: 978-0-330-41915-4
- OCLC: 51483138
- Website: michaelmoore.com/books/downsize-this/

Downsize This! Random Threats from an Unarmed American is a book by American author, documentary filmmaker, and activist Michael Moore.

The book is primarily about the state of business and industry in the United States and their power over the U.S. government. In particular, the book focuses its criticism on corporations that focus on satisfying their shareholders rather than caring for the safety and well-being of the communities they are involved in. It is part of Moore's ongoing campaign for increased corporate accountability.

The book was first published in hardback in 1996 and later in paperback in 1997.

Moore refers to corporations receiving government tax breaks as "corporate welfare mothers." He also includes chapters about famous Americans including Hillary Clinton and O.J. Simpson—including chapters arguing opposing sides of whether or not Simpson was guilty of the murders of Nicole Brown Simpson and Ronald Goldman. Another chapter details Moore's unsuccessful endeavors to have Bob Dornan, a State Representative from the 46th District of California, involuntarily committed for psychiatric evaluation.
