= Brian Springer =

American film director

- Born: 1959 (age 66–67)
- Known for: Film, New media art
- Notable work: Spin (1995)

Brian Springer (born 1959) is an American documentarian and new media artist who works primarily in video, sound, and performance.

== Career ==
Springer spent a year searching for footage by intercepting raw network satellite television feeds not intended for public consumption with the result of his research was Spin. This 1995 feature-length documentary provides insights into how television is used by the industry and by politicians to mold and distort the American public's view of reality. Springer produced Spin as a follow-up to Feed (1992), for which he also provided raw satellite footage. Video Data Bank describes Spin as using outtakes from network satellite feeds to examine television as a system that shapes news, politics, and public debate.

In 2007, Springer released another documentary, The Disappointment: Or, The Force of Credulity.

== Personal life ==
He earned a M.F.A. in art from the University of California, Santa Barbara and his works have been shown at the Hammer Museum in Los Angeles, the Whitney Museum in New York City, the Institute of Contemporary Arts in London, the Centre Pompidou in Paris, and ZKM in Germany.
