= Film Comment =

American arts and culture magazine

- Cover of the May/June 2010 edition, celebrating the 50th year anniversary of Jean-Luc Godard's Breathless (1960)
- Editor: Devika Girish and Clinton Krute
- Categories: Film
- Frequency: Bimonthly
- Circulation: 17,626 (2018)
- Publisher: Film at Lincoln Center
- First issue: 1962
- Country: United States
- Based in: New York City
- Website: filmcomment.com
- ISSN: 0015-119X

Film Comment is the official publication of Film at Lincoln Center. It features reviews and analysis of mainstream, art-house, and avant-garde filmmaking from around the world. Founded in 1962 and originally released as a quarterly, Film Comment began publishing on a bi-monthly basis with the Nov/Dec issue of 1972. The magazine's editorial team also hosts the annual Film Comment Selects at the Film at Lincoln Center. Due to the COVID-19 pandemic, publication of the magazine was suspended in May 2020, and its website was updated on March 10, 2021, with news of the relaunch of the Film Comment podcast and a weekly newsletter.

== History ==
=== Origins ===
Film Comment was founded during the boom years of the international art-house circuit and the so-called New American Cinema, an umbrella term for the era's independently produced documentaries, narrative features, and experimental and underground works. By way of a mission statement, founder-publisher Joseph Blanco wrote in the inaugural issue: "With the increasing interest in the motion picture as an art form, and with the rise of the New American cinema, [Film Comment] takes its place as a publication for the independent film maker and those who share a sincere interest in the unlimited scope of the motion picture."

=== Gordon Hitchens, 1962–1970 ===
The magazine's earliest publishers were Clara Hoover and Austin Lamont. By the third issue, the publishers transferred ownership to Lorien Productions, a corporation that Hoover "formed to cover investments in artistic enterprises" (35, Feb 1984). This period in the magazine's history was marked by a predisposition towards low-budget narrative features and cinéma vérité-style documentaries. Hitchens was inclined towards a dual rejection of Hollywood and of the avant-garde (despite being acquainted with Jonas Mekas and Gregory Markopoulos and being involved in New York's avant-garde scene).

=== Richard Corliss, 1970–1982 ===
- In sharp contrast to comparable film journals like Cahiers du cinéma and Sight & Sound, which were turning towards a more theoretically inflected and academic style of film criticism, corresponding to the contemporary vogue for Althusserian Marxism and Lacanian psychoanalysis, the writing in Film Comment remained relatively prosaic and broadly accessible.
- Corliss' later work, particularly Talking Pictures [1974], mounted a persuasive critique of auteurism through critical emphasis on the creative contribution of screenwriters. He deeply admired Sarris' historical erudition and penetrating formalist insights, and he more generally shared the auteurists' strongly aesthetic sensibilities as well as their love for classical Hollywood cinema.
- Under Corliss' guidance, Film Comment began in earnest an archeological excavation of Hollywood's past, focusing on classical-era directors like Frank Capra, John Ford, Howard Hawks, Alfred Hitchcock, Max Ophüls, Nicholas Ray, and Orson Welles.
- In September–October 1972, the magazine began publishing bimonthly instead of quarterly in order to generate more revenue. Eventually, Lamont had to find someone else to publish the magazine as it sank into a deficit. As a selection committee member on the New York Film Festival, Corliss sparked interest at the Film Society of Lincoln Center (which organizes the festival) in assuming the rights and assets of a publication that could offer it "year-round exposure for its activities" (Feb 1984, 44).
- Publishing responsibilities were assumed by the Film Society of Lincoln Center in 1972.
- Though the magazine changed ownership, Corliss stated that the Film Society had very little direct impact on its editorial content. He claimed that "a writer can make absolutely any opinion that he wants about anything, including Film Society of Lincoln Center policies or the New York Film Festival." The magazine, however, did begin annual coverage of the New York Film Festival as "an obvious bow to the Society's interests" (Feb 1984, 46).

=== Harlan Jacobson, 1982–1990 ===
- The magazine continued to arrange every issue around a midsection that tackled multifaceted issues of film aesthetics, historiography, and various phenomena in film culture. It also maintained a strong commitment to exploring classical Hollywood, even as it broadened the international scope of its criticism with features on Iranian and "Far Eastern" cinema.
- The magazine began to chronicle the technological changes that were shaping film spectatorship. It grappled with "The Video Revolution" in the early 1980s in a midsection devoted to the subject (May/June 1982). J. Hoberman wrote: "If Television gave every American home its own personal rep house, the VCR has the potential to equip every viewer with the equivalent of a Movieola or Steenbeck. The appreciation thus engendered for fragmented (or fetishized) bits of 'Film' will likely have as profound an effect on the film culture of the Eighties as TV had on that of the Fifties and Sixties." This phenomenon was further explored in David Chute's article "Zapper Power" (April 1984).
- Music videos emerged as a point of interest.
- In the February 1984 issue, Film Comment's midsection chronicled its own history from its beginnings as Vision to the financial and editorial challenges that lay before it in the ’80s. "Whatever its level of profitability… Film Comment for the first time in its existence has finally been provided with a steady source of financing and a rock-solid publishing foundation. With Corliss as its editor, the society as its publisher, and a handful of quality writers as its key contributors, Film Comment now seems assured of continued survival and success."
- The midsection in April 1986 commented on the emergence of gay and lesbian representation in contemporary cinema, closeted homosexuals in Hollywood, and gay cinema in the decade of AIDS.

=== Richard Jameson, 1990–2000 ===
- A series of think-pieces on the state of film criticism (March/April, May/June, and July/August 1990) included Richard Corliss' article lamenting the shallowness of TV film reviewing, the star system, and Siskel & Ebert's thumbs-up/thumbs-down approach ("Movie criticism of the elevated sort, as practiced over the past half-century by James Agee and Manny Farber, Andrew Sarris and Pauline Kael, J. Hoberman and Dave Kehr...is an endangered species"); a back-and-forth between Roger Ebert and Corliss; and an article by Andrew Sarris on auteurism, in which he cautions his younger colleagues on being overly despairing or flippantly humorous about the state of contemporary cinema.
- The inclusion of a midsection on a specific topic in every issue was discontinued.
- A new focus on assessing the careers of international auteurs (Chen Kaige, Ousmane Sembène, Krzysztof Kieślowski, Lars von Trier, André Téchiné, Abbas Kiarostami). The magazine also publishes several lengthy assessments of major contemporary filmmakers, including a two-part essay on Steven Spielberg spread across two issues (May/June and July/August 1992), and a sixty-page collection of articles on Martin Scorsese (May/June 1998). Other special sections on individual directors include a Robert Bresson symposium (May/June 1999) and, under the Gavin Smith editorship, a two-issue assessment of Chris Marker (May/June and July/August 2003).
- The annual "Year in Review" feature was extended to include a "Moments Out of Time" section compiled by Jameson and contributing editor Kathleen Murphy, consisting of a long list of memorable scenes and images from the previous year. This feature, which was discontinued during Gavin Smith's editorship, has been reprised at MSN Movies.

=== Gavin Smith, 2000–2015 ===
- Renewed emphasis on contemporary relevance.
- Punchier visual design.
- Standardization of editorial format, and the addition of several departments:
  - Annual Reader's Poll (Jan/Feb 01);
  - Sound and Vision (Sep/Oct 01);
  - Site Specifics (May/Jun '07)
  - Encore (Originally, "Return Engagement" May/June 6);
- Regular columns assigned to Alex Cox ("Flashback" then later "10,000 Ways to Die", May/June '06), Guy Maddin ("Guy Maddin's Jolly Corner"), Paul Arthur ("Art of the Real", May/June '06), and Olaf Möller ("Olaf's World");
- One of the lengthiest and most controversial articles Film Comment has printed appeared in September/October 2006. "Canon Fodder", by Paul Schrader, asserted the value of and laid the parameters for a film canon, and criticized what it deemed "Nonjudgmentals", who had devised schemes by which art could be closely studied and analyzed without prejudice—the prejudice, that is, of having to determine if the art work is good or bad vis-à-vis another work of art..."
- In 2004, New York Times film critic A. O. Scott described the magazine as, "a stronghold of feisty, intelligent opinion that pushes no particular party line. Its tone of plain-spoken braininess—sophistication without snobbery, erudition with a minimum of jargon—reflects the vitality and variety of international film culture today."
- In 2007, the magazine was awarded the Utne Independent Press Award for Best Arts Coverage.

=== Nicolas Rapold, 2016–2020 ===
- Complete print redesign with expanded editorial, new departments and features, cultivation of new critics, focus on the art and craft of film, and high-profile recognition of filmmakers.
  - First-time cover honorees include Ryan Coogler, Agnès Varda, Spike Lee, Joanna Hogg, Bong Joon-ho, Greta Gerwig, and Apichatpong Weerasethakul.
  - New recurring features include Currents (new and innovative work curated from festivals and elsewhere), Art & Craft (interviews with artists across all areas of filmmaking), Scare Tactics (notable genre cinema, present and past), and Inspired (filmmakers on their influences in their own words)
- Established The Film Comment Podcast as a regular weekly feature, including special serial editions from Cannes, Sundance, and other festivals, and filmmaker interviews.
- Expansion of web editorial into daily publication, with regular news roundups, new columnists, authoritative festival critiques, and in-depth interviews
  - Regular columns dedicated to personal and topical perspectives (Queer & Now & Then and Feeling Seen), genre, nonfiction, classic Hollywood, and intersections between film and other arts (Present Tense).
- Established The Film Comment Talks, regular events accompanying editorial coverage through onstage conversations with filmmakers and critics, including annual Best Films of the Year discussion and countdown.
- Magazine honored with a Film Heritage Award by the National Society of Film Critics
- Emphasis as magazine of ideas engaged with the art and craft of filmmaking and with film history, and grounded in original writing and depth of knowledge.

== Notable contributors ==
=== Critics ===
- Gilbert Adair
- Melissa Anderson
- Paul Arthur
- Michael Atkinson
- David Bordwell
- Stuart Byron
- Chris Chang
- David Chute
- Richard Combs
- Manohla Dargis
- Raymond Durgnat
- Roger Ebert
- Manny Farber
- Scott Foundas
- Graham Fuller
- Devika Girish
- Howard Hampton
- Molly Haskell
- Stephen Harvey
- J. Hoberman
- Harlan Jacobson
- Richard T. Jameson
- Kent Jones
- Kristin M. Jones
- Dave Kehr
- Laura Kern
- Stuart Klawans
- Michael Koresky
- Nathan Lee
- Dennis Lim
- Violet Lucca
- Todd McCarthy
- James McCourt
- Maitland McDonagh
- Tom Milne
- Olaf Möller
- Kathleen Murphy
- Farran Smith Nehme
- Chris Norris
- Geoffrey O'Brien
- Sheila O'Malley
- Mark Olsen
- Patricia Patterson
- Nick Pinkerton
- Nicolas Rapold
- Tony Rayns
- Frank Rich
- Donald Richie
- Jonathan Romney
- Jonathan Rosenbaum
- Andrew Sarris
- Richard Schickel
- Imogen Sara Smith
- Michael Sragow
- Elliott Stein
- Chuck Stephens
- Amy Taubin
- José Teodoro
- Anne Thompson
- David Thomson
- Amos Vogel
- Beverly Walker
- Armond White
- Robin Wood

=== Others ===
- Woody Allen
- Olivier Assayas
- Ari Aster
- Ingmar Bergman
- Alex Cox
- Jacques Demy
- Arnaud Desplechin
- Jodie Foster
- John Kenneth Galbraith
- Haden Guest
- Matt Groening
- Larry Gross
- Agnieszka Holland
- Barry Jenkins
- Stephen King
- Phillip Lopate
- Guy Maddin
- David Mamet
- Michael Ondaatje
- Pier Paolo Pasolini
- Michael Powell
- Oliver Sacks
- Paul Schrader
- Martin Scorsese
- Susan Sontag
- Steven Spielberg
- Quentin Tarantino
- John Waters

== See also ==
- Film at Lincoln Center
- List of film periodicals
