= Captain Mike Across America =

- Poster for the re-edited version of the film
- Directed by: Michael Moore
- Written by: Michael Moore
- Produced by: Monica Hampton
- Starring: Michael Moore
- Narrated by: Michael Moore
- Cinematography: Bernardo Loyola, Kirsten Johnson
- Edited by: Bernardo Loyola, David Feinberg
- Distributed by: The Weinstein Company
- Release dates: September 7, 2007 (Toronto International Film Festival); September 23, 2008 (United States)
- Running time: 102 minutes
- Country: United States
- Language: English

Captain Mike Across America is a film written, directed and narrated by Michael Moore. It was filmed prior to the 2004 election, when the polling margin between candidates George W. Bush and John Kerry could have tipped either way. It debuted at the Toronto International Film Festival on September 7 and 8, 2007. The film was re-edited by Moore into Slacker Uprising, which was released for free on the Internet on September 23, 2008.

It is one of the first feature-length films made by a known director to be released as both a free and legal downloadable online movie. The free download is only available to those residing in the United States and Canada. The film was also made available free for online viewing and download on the Lycos Cinema platform as well as iTunes and blip.tv. It had a one-night-only run at the Michigan Theater, where Michael Moore spoke briefly. The film is available in DVD format.

Slacker Uprising features live performances or appearances by Eddie Vedder (of Pearl Jam), Roseanne Barr, Joan Baez, Tom Morello (of Rage Against the Machine), R.E.M., Steve Earle, and Viggo Mortensen. The original score is by Anti-Flag.

== Critical reception ==
Captain Mike Across America premiered at the Toronto International Film Festival to lackluster reviews. Most critics alleged that it served as little more than self-promotion for Moore.

Joe Leydon of Variety magazine wrote: "One could easily carve an interesting hour-long documentary out of Captain Mike Across America, Michael Moore's ungainly account of his "Slacker Uprising" campaign to encourage young people to vote for John Kerry—and, more importantly, against George W. Bush—during the 2004 U.S. presidential election. In its current form, however, this repetitious and self-indulgent hodgepodge comes across as a nostalgia-drenched vanity project, with far too much footage of various celebs at assorted gatherings introducing Moore as the greatest thing since sliced bread."

Will Sloan of Inside Toronto wrote: "This is probably Moore’s least-compelling film from a cinematic point of view. It plays not so much like a movie, or even a concert film, as a highlight reel. The film builds little momentum as it goes along, and it has virtually none of the drama that characterized his previous films. The pacing essentially never changes. There are some good moments, including a genuinely hilarious scene where Moore offers up some alternatives to the Swift Boat Veterans for Truth ads ("If John Kerry really loved his country, he would have died"), and if you're a Moore devotee, you'll find it mildly interesting, but if you're not, there isn't much to keep you riveted."

On Rotten Tomatoes 29% of 17 reviews were positive, with an average rating of 4.3/10.
