= Michael Moore =

American filmmaker and author (born 1954)

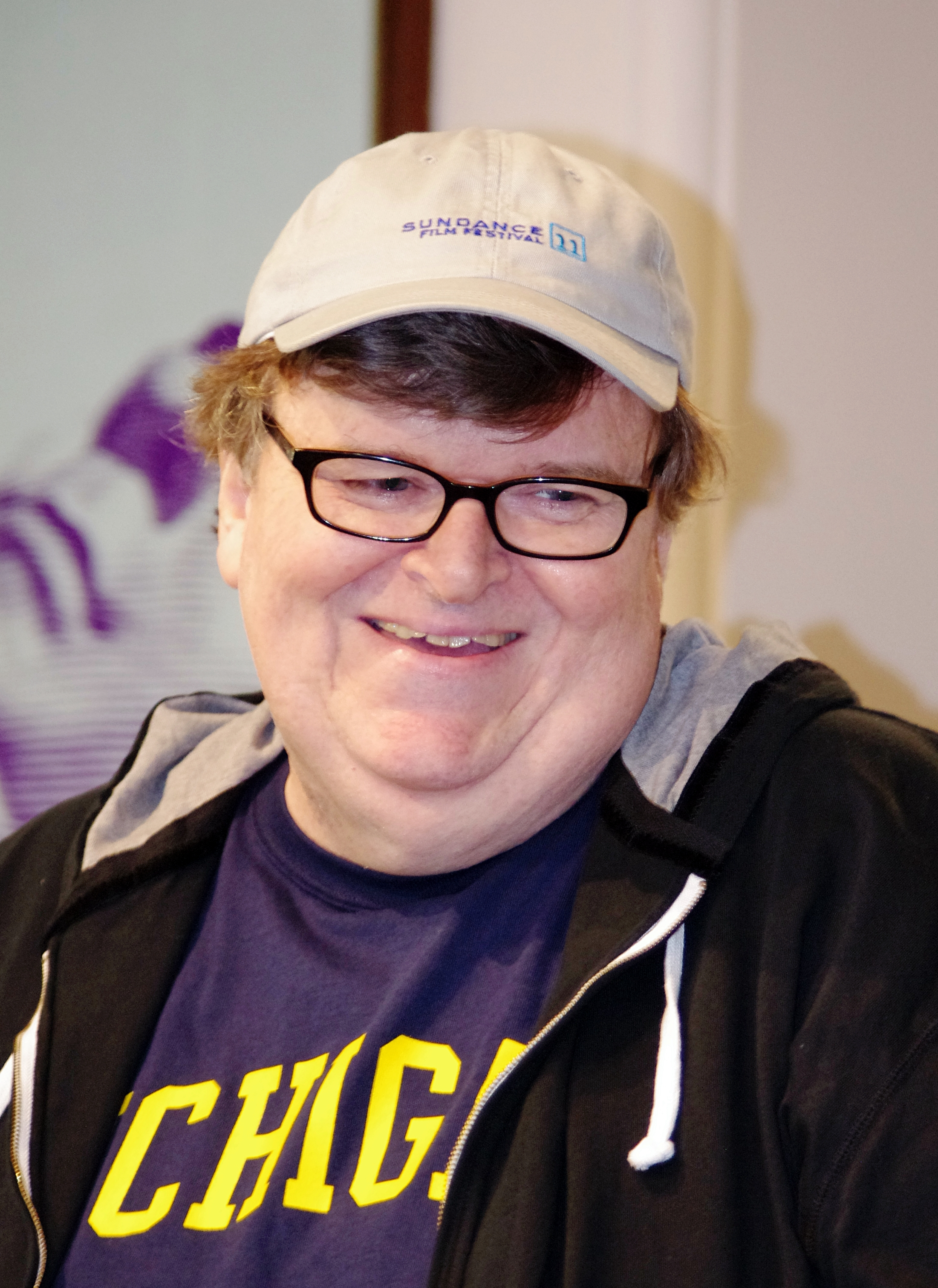
- Moore in 2011
- Born: Michael Francis Moore; April 23, 1954 (age 72); Flint, Michigan, U.S.
- Occupations: Film director; author; activist; producer; screenwriter
- Years active: 1976–present
- Spouse: Kathleen Glynn (m. 1991; div. 2014)
- Website: www.michaelmoore.com

Michael Francis Moore (born April 23, 1954) is an American film director, producer, screenwriter, and author. Moore's work frequently addresses various social, political, and economic topics from a progressive standpoint. He first became publicly known for his award-winning debut documentary Roger & Me, a scathing look at the downfall of the automotive industry in 1980s Flint and Detroit.

Moore followed up and won the 2002 Academy Award for Best Documentary Feature for Bowling for Columbine, which examines the causes of the Columbine High School massacre and the overall gun culture in the United States. He directed and produced Fahrenheit 9/11, a critical look at the early presidency of George W. Bush and the war on terror, which earned $119,194,771 to become the highest-grossing documentary at the American box office of all time. The film won the Palme d'Or at the 2004 Cannes Film Festival, and was the subject of intense controversy. His documentary Sicko examines health care in the United States, and is one of the top ten highest-grossing documentaries as of 2020. In September 2008, he released his first free film on the Internet, Slacker Uprising, which documents his personal quest to encourage Americans to vote in presidential elections. He has written and starred in TV Nation, a satirical news-magazine television series, and The Awful Truth, a satirical show. In 2018, he released his latest film, Fahrenheit 11/9, a documentary about the 2016 United States presidential election and the first term of Donald Trump. He was executive producer of Planet of the Humans (2019), a documentary about the environmental movement.

Moore's works criticize topics such as globalization, big business, assault weapon ownership, Presidents Bill Clinton, George W. Bush, and Donald Trump, the Iraq War, the American health care system, and capitalism overall. In 2005, Time named Moore one of the world's 100 most influential people. Some critics have criticized and labeled Moore a "propagandist" and his films propaganda.

== Early life and education ==
Michael Francis Moore (born April 23, 1954) in Flint, Michigan, and grew up in the nearby suburb of Davison, where he was raised by parents Veronica (née Wall), and Francis Richard "Frank" Moore, an automotive assembly-line worker. At that time, Flint was home to many General Motors factories, where his parents and grandfather worked. His uncle LaVerne was one of the founders of the United Automobile Workers labor union and participated in the Flint sit-down strike.

Moore was brought up in a traditional Catholic home, and has Irish, and smaller amounts of Scottish and English, ancestry. Some of his ancestors were Quakers.

Moore attended the parochial St. John's Elementary School, in John the Evangelist Parish, for primary school, and later attended St. Paul's Seminary in Saginaw, Michigan, for a year.

He then attended Davison High School, where he was active in both drama and debate. At the age of 18, he was elected to the Davison school board. At the time he was the youngest person elected to office in the U.S., as the minimum age to hold public office had just been lowered to 18.

Moore attended the University of Michigan–Flint but dropped out during his second year.

== Career ==
=== 1977–1986: Journalism ===
At age 22, Moore founded the alternative newspaper Free to Be..., later renamed The Flint Voice (Burton, Michigan 1977–1982), later renamed to The Michigan Voice (Burton, Michigan 1983–1986) as it expanded to cover the entire state.

Singer-songwriter Harry Chapin is credited with being the primary benefactor in bringing about the bi-weekly newspaper's launch, by performing benefit concerts and donating the money to Moore. Moore crept backstage after a concert to Chapin's dressing room and convinced him to do a benefit concert. Chapin subsequently did a concert in Flint every year.

In April 1986, The Michigan Voice published its final issue as Moore moved to San Francisco.

After four months at Mother Jones in 1986, Moore was fired in early September. Matt Labash of The Weekly Standard reported this was for refusing to print an article by Paul Berman that was critical of the Sandinista human rights record in Nicaragua. Moore refused to run the article because he believed it was inaccurate and would be used by the Reagan Administration against the Sandinistas. Speaking on the matter, Moore stated, "The article was flatly wrong and the worst kind of patronizing bullshit. You would scarcely know from it that the United States had been at war with Nicaragua for the last five years." Chairman of the Foundation for National Progress (which owns Mother Jones) Adam Hochschild said that Moore was fired due to performing poorly at his job. According to The New York Times, senior staff members felt that Moore was "rigidly ideological".

Moore has contended that Mother Jones fired him because of the publisher's refusal to allow him to cover a story on the GM plant closings in his hometown of Flint, Michigan. Moore responded by putting laid-off GM worker Ben Hamper, who also wrote for the same magazine at the time, on the magazine's cover. This act led to his termination. Moore sued for wrongful dismissal, and settled out of court for $58,000, providing him with some of the seed money, with other fund raising efforts, including bingo games, for his first film, Roger & Me. Moore worked for Ralph Nader as the editor of a newsletter after being fired by Mother Jones, which provided further financial support during this period.

=== 1989–present: Directing, producing and screenwriting ===
==== Roger and Me ====
The 1989 film Roger & Me was Moore's first documentary about what happened to Flint, Michigan, after General Motors closed its factories and opened new ones in Mexico where the workers were paid lower wages than their American counterparts. The "Roger" referred to in the title is Roger B. Smith, then CEO and President of General Motors.

Harlan Jacobson, editor of Film Comment magazine, said that Moore muddled the chronology in Roger & Me to make it seem that events that took place before G.M.'s layoffs were a consequence of them. Critic Roger Ebert defended Moore's handling of the timeline as an artistic and stylistic choice that had less to do with his credibility as a filmmaker and more to do with the flexibility of film as a medium to express a satiric viewpoint.

==== Pets or Meat: The Return to Flint ====
Moore made a follow-up 23-minute documentary film, Pets or Meat: The Return to Flint, that aired on PBS in 1992. It is based on Roger & Me. The film's title refers to Rhonda Britton, a Flint, Michigan resident featured in both the 1989 and 1992 films, who sells rabbits as either pets or meat.

==== Canadian Bacon ====
Moore's 1995 satirical film Canadian Bacon features a fictional U.S. president (played by Alan Alda) engineering a fake war with Canada to boost his popularity. The film is also one of the last featuring Canadian actor John Candy. Some commentators in the media felt the film was influenced by the Stanley Kubrick film Dr. Strangelove.

==== The Big One ====
Moore's 1997 film The Big One documents the tour publicizing Moore's book Downsize This! Random Threats from an Unarmed American, in which he criticizes mass layoffs despite record corporate profits. Among others, he targets Nike for outsourcing shoe production to Indonesia.

==== Bowling for Columbine ====
His documentary Bowling for Columbine, released in 2002, probes the culture of guns and violence in the United States, taking, as a starting point, the Columbine High School massacre of 1999. Bowling for Columbine won the Anniversary Prize at the 2002 Cannes Film Festival and France's César Award as the Best Foreign Film. In the United States, it won the 2002 Academy Award for Documentary Feature. It also enjoyed great commercial and critical success for a film of its type, and has since gone on to be considered one of the greatest documentary films of all-time. At the time of Columbine's release, it was the highest-grossing mainstream-released documentary (a record now held by Moore's Fahrenheit 9/11).

Shortly after winning the Academy Award for Best Documentary Feature for Bowling for Columbine, Moore spoke out against U.S. President George W. Bush and the Iraq War, which had just started three days prior. He further criticized the president by stating, "We live in a time where we have fictitious election results that elects a fictitious president. We live in a time where we have a man sending us to war for fictitious reasons." The speech was received with a cacophony of boos, applause, and standing ovations from the audience at the theater. Moments after the speech concluded, to lighten the mood, host Steve Martin joked, "The Teamsters are helping Michael Moore into the trunk of his limo." Moore later said a stagehand "screamed 'asshole' right in my eardrum." After his return flight, he opened his bag to find his Oscar had been keyed, with a TSA notice.

==== Fahrenheit 9/11 ====
Moore's film Fahrenheit 9/11, released in 2004, examines America in the aftermath of the September 11 attacks, particularly the record of the George W. Bush Administration and alleged links between the families of George W. Bush and Osama bin Laden. Fahrenheit was awarded the Palme d'Or, the top honor at the 2004 Cannes Film Festival. It was the first documentary film to win the prize since 1956's The Silent World.

Moore later announced that Fahrenheit 9/11 would not be in consideration for the 2005 Academy Award for Documentary Feature, but instead for the Academy Award for Best Picture. He stated he wanted the movie to be seen by a few million more people via television broadcasting prior to Election Day. According to Moore, "Academy rules forbid the airing of a documentary on television within nine months of its theatrical release", and since the November 2 election was fewer than nine months after the film's release, Fahrenheit 9/11 would have been disqualified for the Documentary Oscar. Regardless, it did not receive an Oscar nomination for Best Picture.

The title of the film alludes to the classic book Fahrenheit 451 by Ray Bradbury, about a future totalitarian state in which books are banned, and any books found are burned by firemen. According to the novel, paper begins to burn at 451 °F (233 °C). The pre-release subtitle of Moore's film continues the allusion: "The temperature at which freedom burns."

As of August 2012, Fahrenheit 9/11 is the highest-grossing documentary of all time, taking in over US$200 million worldwide, including United States box office revenue of almost US$120 million. In February 2011, Moore sued producers Bob and Harvey Weinstein for US$2.7 million in unpaid profits from the film, claiming they used "Hollywood accounting tricks" to avoid paying him the money. In February 2012, Moore and the Weinsteins informed the court that they had settled their dispute.

Fahrenheit 9/11 drew criticism and controversy following its release just prior to the 2004 United States presidential election. Journalist and literary critic Christopher Hitchens alleged that the film contained distortions and untruths. This contention drew multiple rebuttals, including an eFilmCritic article and an editorial in the Columbus Free Press.

==== Sicko ====
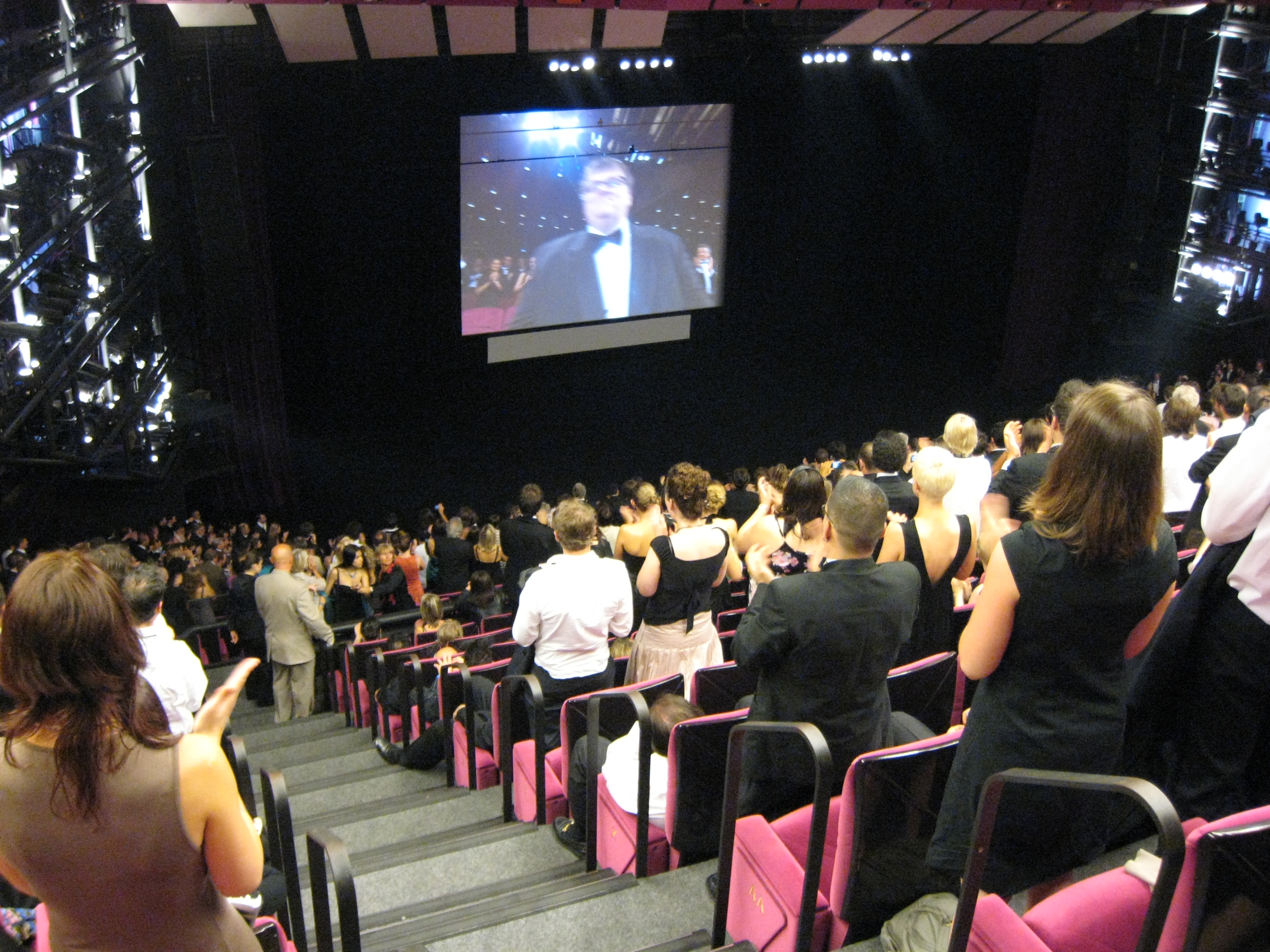
Moore at the 2007 Cannes Film Festival receiving a standing ovation for Sicko

Moore directed the 2007 film Sicko, about the American health care system, focusing particularly on the managed-care and pharmaceutical industries. At least four major pharmaceutical companies—Pfizer, Eli Lilly, AstraZeneca, and GlaxoSmithKline—ordered their employees not to grant any interviews or assist Moore. According to Moore in a letter on his website, "roads that often surprise us and lead us to new ideas—and challenge us to reconsider the ones we began with have caused some minor delays." The film premiered at the Cannes Film Festival on May 19, 2007, receiving a lengthy standing ovation, and was released in the U.S. and Canada on June 29, 2007. The film is currently ranked the twelfth highest grossing documentary of all time and received an Academy Award nomination for Best Documentary Feature.

==== Captain Mike Across America and Slacker Uprising ====
Moore takes a look at the politics of college students in what he calls "Bush Administration America" with Captain Mike Across America, which was shot during Moore's 62-city college campus tour in the months leading up to the 2004 presidential election. The film debuted at the Toronto International Film Festival on September 7, 2007. It was later re-edited by Moore into Slacker Uprising and released for free on the internet on September 23, 2008.

==== Capitalism: A Love Story ====
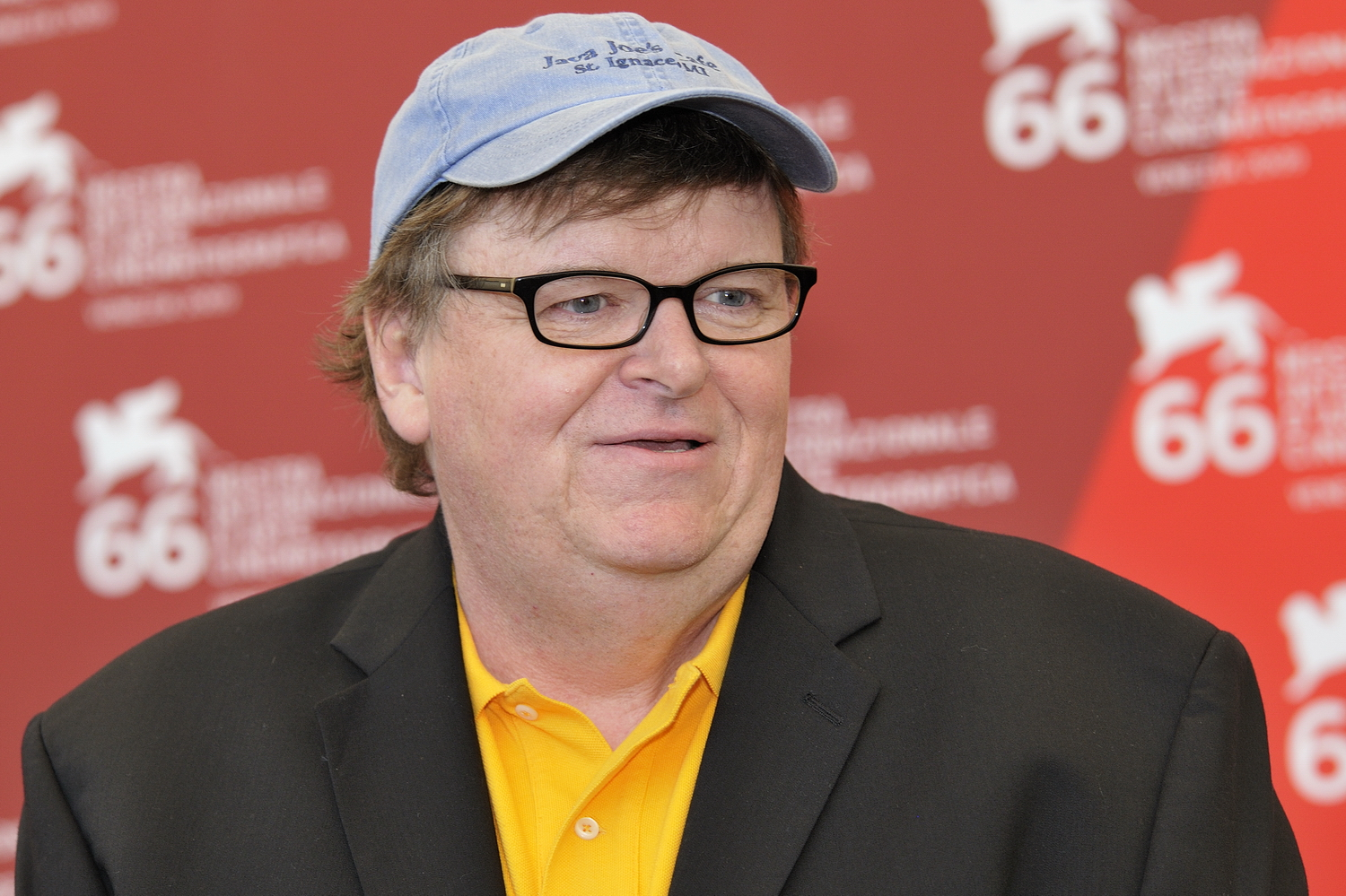
Moore at the 66th Venice International Film Festival in September 2009

Released on September 23, 2009, Capitalism: A Love Story analyzes the 2008 financial crisis and the U.S. economy during the transition between the Presidency of George W. Bush and the Presidency of Barack Obama. Addressing a press conference at its release, Moore said, "Democracy is not a spectator sport, it's a participatory event. If we don't participate in it, it ceases to be a democracy. So Obama will rise or fall based not so much on what he does but on what we do to support him."

==== Where to Invade Next ====
Where to Invade Next examines the benefits of progressive social policies in various countries. The film had its premiere at the 2015 Toronto International Film Festival. Godfrey Cheshire, writing for Roger Ebert.com, wrote that "Moore's surprising and extraordinarily winning Where to Invade Next will almost surely cast his detractors at Fox News and similar sinkholes into consternation".

==== Michael Moore in TrumpLand ====
In Michael Moore in TrumpLand, Moore talks about the 2016 Presidential Election Campaigns. It is a solo performance showing Moore on stage speaking to a seated audience. The film consists of Moore's opinions of the candidates and highlights the Democratic National Candidate Hillary Clinton's strengths and also features a lengthy section on how the Republican National Candidate Donald Trump could win. It was filmed in Wilmington, Ohio, at the Murphy Theatre over the course of two nights in October 2016. The film premiered just eleven days after it was shot at the IFC Center in New York City.

==== Fahrenheit 11/9 ====
In May 2017, it was announced that Moore had reunited with Harvey Weinstein to direct his new film about Donald Trump, titled Fahrenheit 11/9, which was released in approximately 1,500 theaters in the United States and Canada on September 21, 2018. Sexual assault allegations against Weinstein prompted Moore to revoke the plan to work with The Weinstein Company, which stalled production.

The title refers to the day when Donald Trump officially became President-elect of the United States. In a column for Variety responding to the film's low opening weekend, "How Michael Moore Lost His Audience," sympathetic film critic Owen Gleiberman wrote "He's like an aging rock star putting out albums that simply don't mean as much to those who were, and are, his core fans". According to Glenn Greenwald, "what he's trying is of unparalleled importance, not to take the cheap route of exclusively denouncing Trump, but to take the more complicated, challenging, and productive route of understanding who and what created the climate in which Trump could thrive."

==== Planet of the Humans ====
Michael Moore was executive producer of the documentary Planet of the Humans, which was directed by Jeff Gibbs and released on July 31, 2019. The film makes the argument that, since the first Earth Day, the condition of the planet has worsened, and questions whether mainstream approaches adopted by industry to mitigate climate change, entail environmental impacts whose costs are comparable to or even possibly outweigh the benefits. The film received criticism from a number of climate change experts and activists who disputed its claims, and the accuracy of figures cited in the film, and suggested that the film could play into the hands of the fossil fuel industry.

Michael Moore, Jeff Gibbs, and co-producer Ozzie Zehner responded to the critics on an episode of Rising.

=== 2001–2003: Writing ===
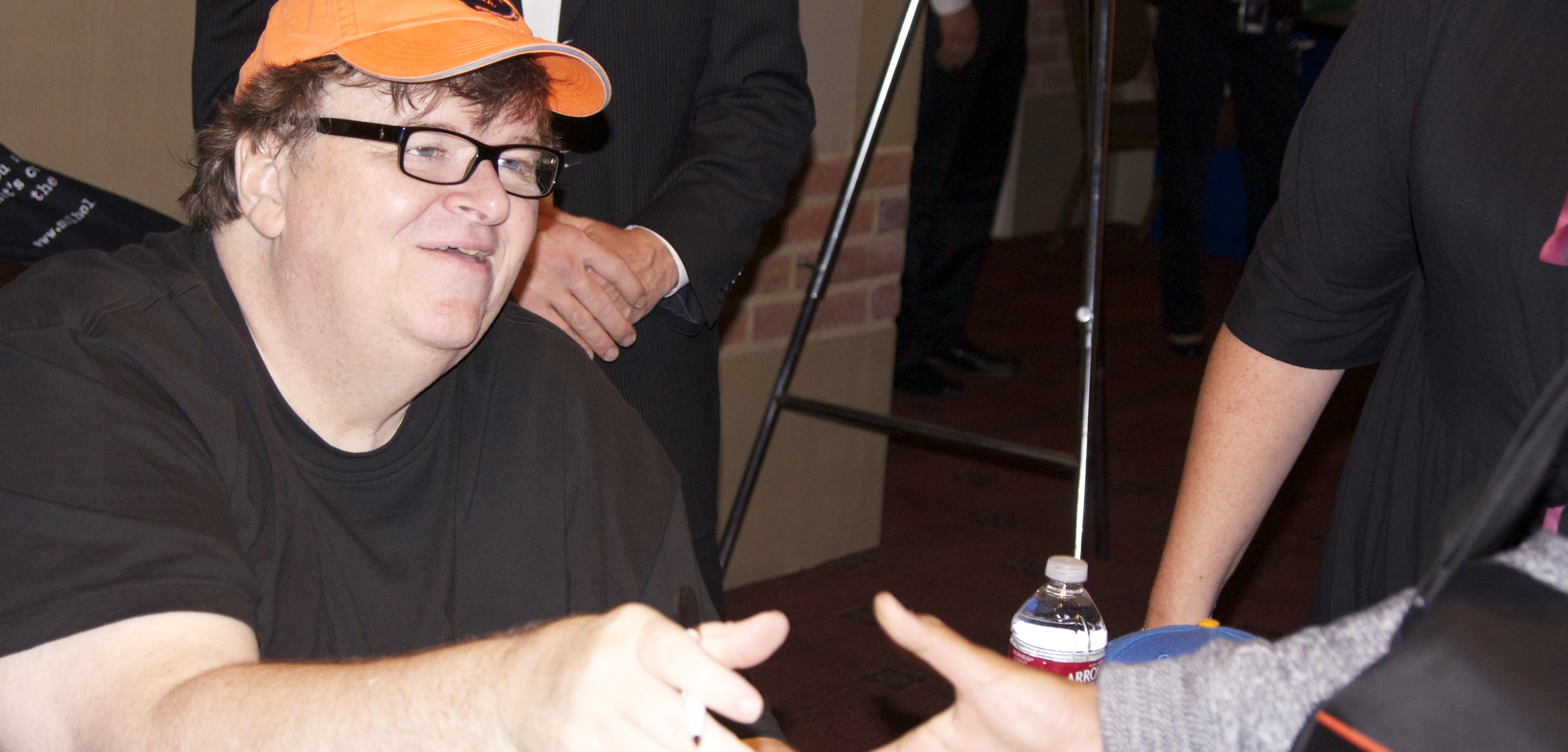
Moore at Royce Hall, UCLA to promote his memoir Here Comes Trouble, September 2011

Moore has written and co-written eight non-fiction books, mostly on similar subject matter to his documentaries. Stupid White Men (2001) is ostensibly a critique of American domestic and foreign policy but, by Moore's own admission, is also "a book of political humor". Dude, Where's My Country? (2003), is an examination of the Bush family's relationships with Saudi royalty, the Bin Laden family, and the energy industry, and a call-to-action for liberals in the 2004 election. Several of his works have made bestseller lists.

=== 1999–2004: Acting ===
Moore has dabbled in acting, following a supporting role in Lucky Numbers (2000) playing the cousin of Lisa Kudrow's character, who agrees to be part of the scheme concocted by John Travolta's character. He also had a cameo in his Canadian Bacon as an anti-Canada activist. In 1999, he did a cameo in EDtv as one of the panel members. In 2004, he did a cameo, as a news journalist, in The Fever, starring Vanessa Redgrave in the lead.

=== 1994–2017: Television ===
Between 1994 and 1995, Moore directed and hosted the BBC television series TV Nation, which followed the format of news magazine shows but covered topics they avoid. The series aired on BBC2 in the UK. The series was also aired in the US on NBC in 1994 for 9 episodes and again for 8 episodes on Fox in 1995.

His other major series was The Awful Truth, which satirized actions by big corporations and politicians. It aired on the UK's Channel 4, and the Bravo network in the US, in 1999 and 2000. Moore won the Hugh M. Hefner First Amendment Award in Arts and Entertainment for being the executive producer and host of The Awful Truth, where he was also described as "muckraker, author and documentary filmmaker".

Another 1999 series, Michael Moore Live, was aired in the UK only on Channel 4, though it was broadcast from New York. This show had a similar format to The Awful Truth, but also incorporated phone-ins and a live stunt each week.

In 2017, Moore planned to return to prime time network television on Turner/TNT in late 2017 or early 2018 with a program called "Michael Moore Live from the Apocalypse". In February 2019, however, the network announced the show would not be produced.

In 2003, he guest starred as himself on The Simpsons episode "The President Wore Pearls", stating that children who do not receive music, gym and art are more likely to become unemployed and end up in one of his movies.

=== 1991–2001: Music videos ===
Moore has directed several music videos, including two for Rage Against the Machine for songs from The Battle of Los Angeles: "Sleep Now in the Fire" and "Testify". He was threatened with arrest during the shooting of "Sleep Now in the Fire", which was filmed on Wall Street; and subsequently the city of New York City denied the band permission to play there, even though the band and Moore had secured a federal permit to perform.

Moore also directed the videos for R.E.M. single "All the Way to Reno (You're Gonna Be a Star)" in 2001 and the System of a Down song "Boom!".

=== Appearances in other documentaries ===
Moore appearing in the documentary series The Circus: Inside the Greatest Political Show on Earth in 2020

- He appeared in The Drugging of Our Children, a 2005 documentary about over-prescription of psychiatric medication to children and teenagers, directed by Gary Null, a proponent of alternative medicine. In the film Moore agrees with Gary Null that Ritalin and other similar drugs are over-prescribed, saying that they are seen as a "pacifier".
- He appeared on fellow Flint natives Grand Funk Railroad's episode of Behind the Music.
- He appeared as an off-camera interviewer in Blood in the Face, a 1991 documentary about white supremacy groups. At the center of the film is a neo-Nazi gathering in Michigan.
- Moore appeared in the 2001 documovie The Party's Over discussing Democrats and Republicans.
- He appeared in The Yes Men, a 2003 documentary about two men who pose as the World Trade Organization. He appears during a segment concerning working conditions in Mexico and Latin America.
- Moore was interviewed for the 2004 documentary, The Corporation. One of his highlighted quotes was: "The problem is the profit motive: for corporations, there's no such thing as enough."
- He appeared in the 2006 documentary I'm Going to Tell You a Secret, which chronicles Madonna's 2004 Re-Invention World Tour. Moore attended her show in New York City at Madison Square Garden.
- He appeared briefly in the 2016 documentary Cameraperson, directed by Kirsten Johnson, who was one of his camera operators in Fahrenheit 9/11.

=== 2017–2018: Theater ===
Moore's Broadway debut, The Terms of My Surrender, an anti-Trump dramatic monologue, premiered on August 10, 2017, at the Belasco Theatre. Donald Trump tweeted his dislike for the show and falsely claimed that it closed early. In the first week the production earned $456,195 in sales and $367,634 in the final week, altogether grossing $4.2 million, falling short of its potential gross. It lasted 13 weeks with 96 performances until October 2017, grossing 49% of its potential. Fox News gave it a negative review, in line with Trump's comments. The show was unenthusiastically praised by The Guardian, which said he only wanted to "preach to the choir". A spokesman for "The Terms of My Surrender" suggested that the production might have an engagement in San Francisco in early 2018, which didn't materialize.

== Honorary degree ==
He was awarded the Honorary Degree of Doctor of Humanities from Michigan State University in Fall 2014.

== Political views ==
Moore is commonly labeled as a leading figure in the U.S. progressive movement in the 21st century. Although Moore has been known for his political activism, he rejects the label as redundant in a democracy: "I and you and everyone else has to be a political activist. If we're not politically active, it ceases to be a democracy." According to John Flesher of the Associated Press, Moore is known for his "fiery left-wing populism", and publications such as the Socialist Worker Online have hailed him as the "new Tom Paine". One critic has traced the leftist populism in three of his films (Roger & Me, Sicko, and Capitalism: A Love Story), arguing that at least these films showcase Moore's populism as embracing specific social causes while also demonstrating an irreverent style that positions Moore as the proverbial little guy 'talking truth to power' against a corporate elite. In a speech, he said that socialism is democracy and Christianity. However, he later said that economic philosophies from the past were not apt enough to describe today's realities.

Moore was a high-profile guest at both the 2004 Democratic National Convention and the 2004 Republican National Convention, chronicling his impressions in USA Today. He was criticized in a speech by Republican Senator John McCain as "a disingenuous film-maker". Moore laughed and waved as Republican attendees jeered, later chanting "four more years". Moore gestured an L with his index finger and thumb at the crowd, which translates into "loser".

During September and October 2004, Moore spoke at universities and colleges in swing states during his "Slacker Uprising Tour". The tour gave away ramen and underwear to students who promised to vote. One stop during the tour was Utah Valley State College. A fight for his right to speak resulted in massive public debates and a media blitz, eventually resulting in a lawsuit against the college and the resignation of at least one member of the college's student government. The Utah event was chronicled in the documentary film This Divided State.

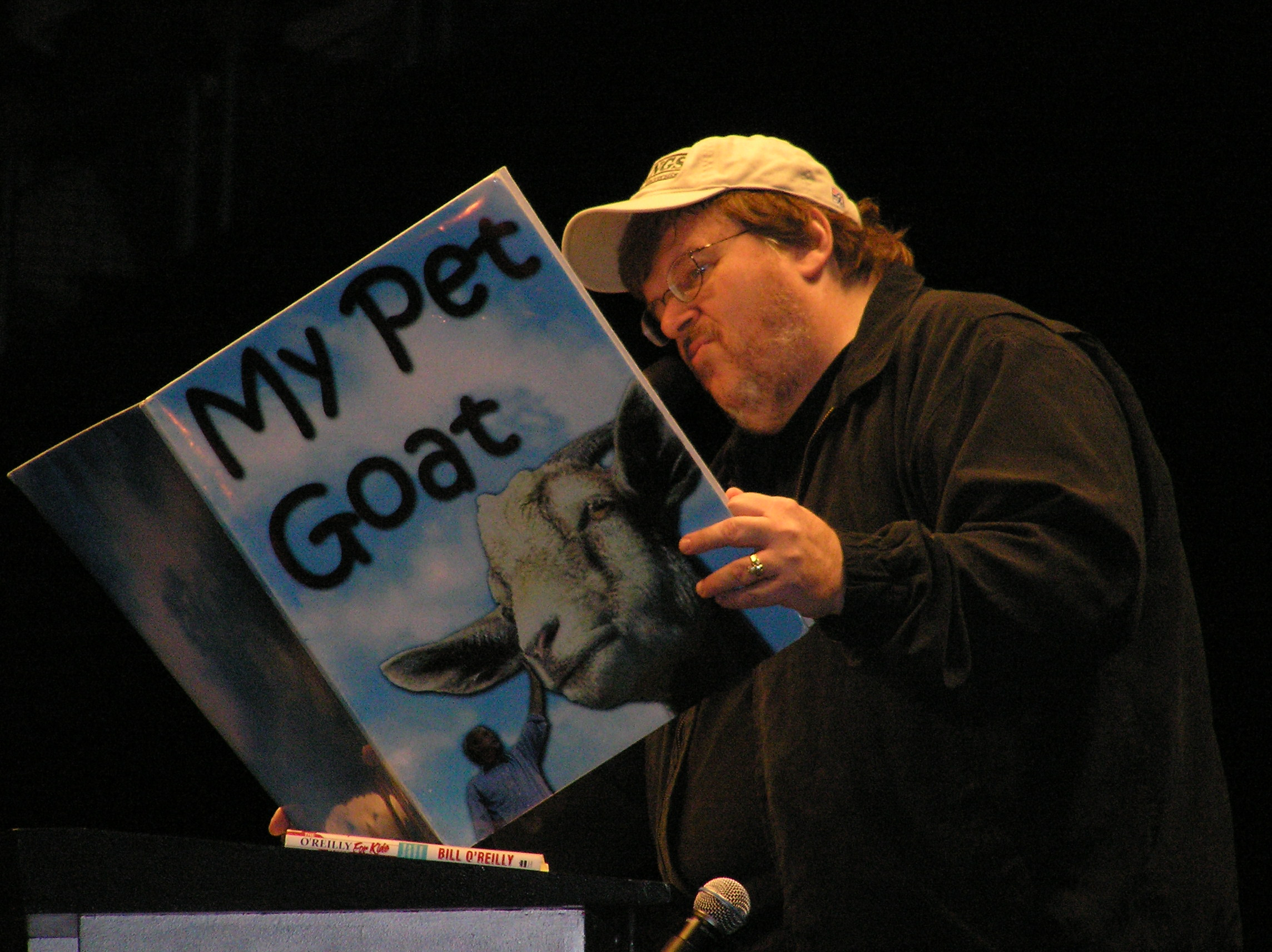
Moore lampoons George W. Bush's reaction to the September 11 attacks notification.

Moore urged Ralph Nader not to run in 2004 so as not to split the left vote. On Real Time with Bill Maher, Moore and Bill Maher knelt before Nader to plead with him to stay out of the race.

Moore drew attention in 2004 when he used the term "deserter" to describe then president George W. Bush while introducing Retired Army Gen. Wesley K. Clark at a Democratic presidential debate in New Hampshire. Noting that Clark had been a champion debater at West Point, Moore told a laughing crowd, "I know what you're thinking. I want to see that debate" between Clark and Bush – "the general versus the deserter". Moore said he was referring to published reports in several media outlets including The Boston Globe which had reported that "there is strong evidence that Bush performed no military service as required when he moved from Houston to Alabama to work on a U.S. Senate campaign from May to November 1972."

In 2007, Moore became a contributing journalist at OpEdNews, and by May 2014, had authored over 70 articles published on their website. Moore was an active supporter of the Occupy Wall Street protest in New York City and spoke with the OWS protesters on September 26, 2011. On October 29, 2011, he spoke at the Occupy Oakland protest site to express his support.

Moore praised Django Unchained, tweeting that the movie "is one of the best film satires ever. A rare American movie on slavery and the origins of our sick racist history."

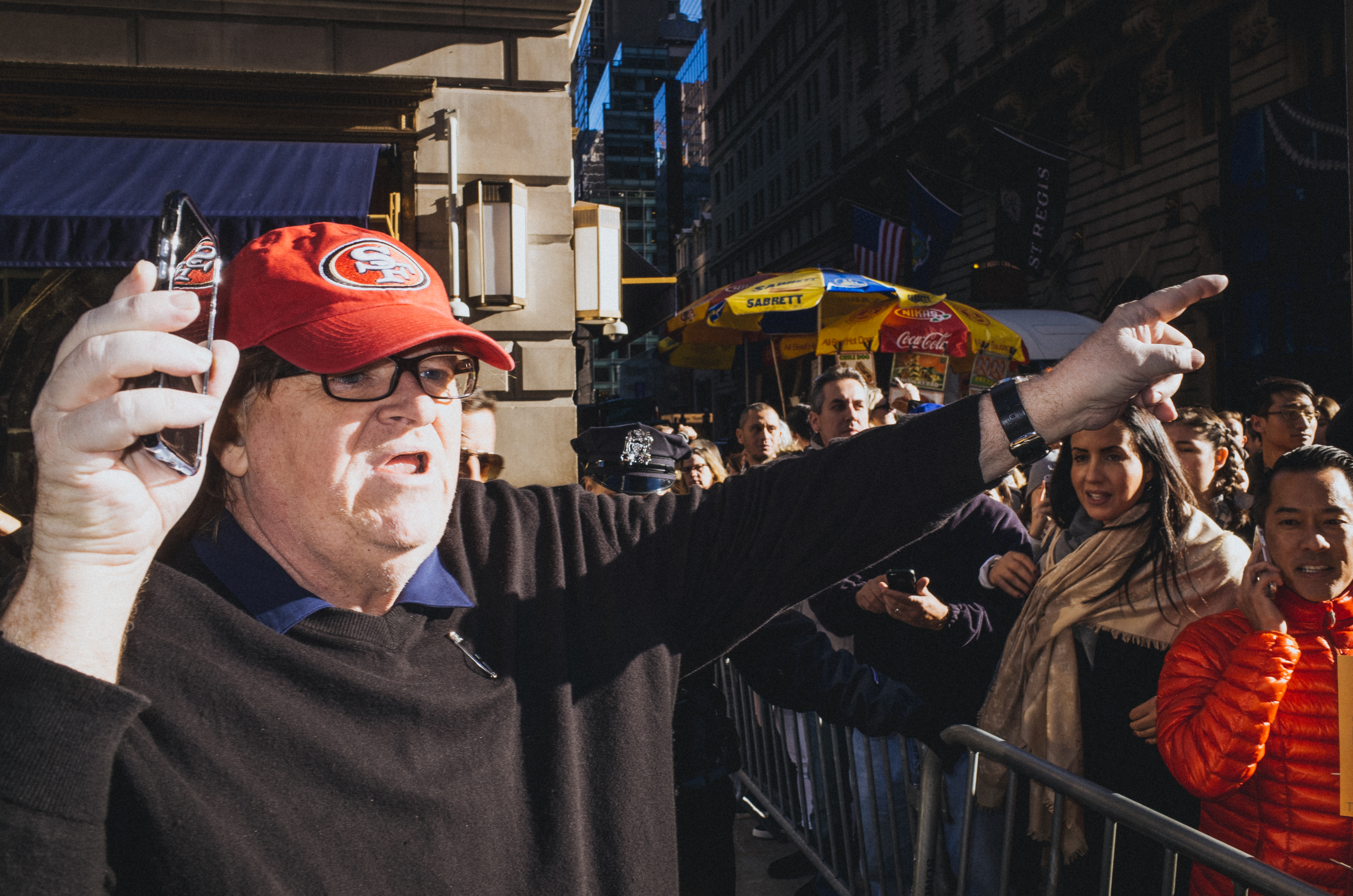
Moore at the anti-Trump rally in New York City, November 12, 2016

Moore's 2011 claims that "Four hundred obscenely wealthy individuals, 400 little Mubaraks – most of whom benefited in some way from the multi-trillion-dollar taxpayer bailout of 2008 – now have more cash, stock and property than the assets of 155 million Americans combined" and that these 400 Americans "have more wealth than half of all Americans combined" was found to be true by PolitiFact and others.

After Venezuelan President Hugo Chávez died in March 2013, Moore praised him for "eliminating 75 percent of extreme poverty" while "[providing] free health and education for all".

=== 2000 presidential election ===
Moore supported Ralph Nader in the 2000 presidential election. Moore was critical of Al Gore and George W. Bush. Moore criticizes Gore for the loss of thousands of jobs during his time as vice president, voting to confirm Antonin Scalia, proposing more funding for the Pentagon, and proposing to expand the war on drugs. Moore reportedly told Bush "Your possible victory on Tuesday is a threat to our national security". Moore also called Bush "a banal, despicable, and corrupt human being".

=== Barack Obama ===
On April 21, 2008, Moore endorsed Barack Obama for president, stating that Hillary Clinton's recent actions had been "disgusting". Moore criticized the 2011 military intervention in Libya. After the US troops launched 110 Tomahawk missiles at military targets in Libya, Moore suggested that President Barack Obama should return his Nobel Peace Prize and tweeted in his official Twitter account, "May I suggest a 50-mile evacuation zone around Obama's Nobel Peace Prize?"

==== Criticism of Obamacare and support for a single-payer model ====
In an op-ed piece for The New York Times published on December 31, 2013, Moore assessed the Affordable Care Act, calling it "awful" and adding that "Obamacare's rocky start ... is a result of one fatal flaw: The Affordable Care Act is a pro-insurance-industry plan implemented by a president who knew in his heart that a single-payer, Medicare-for-all model was the true way to go." Despite his strong critique, however, Moore wrote that he still considers the plan a "godsend" because it provides a start "to get what we deserve: universal quality health care."

=== 2016 Presidential election ===
==== Support for Bernie Sanders ====
In December 2015, Moore announced his support for Vermont Senator Bernie Sanders in the 2016 United States presidential election. Moore called Sanders a "force to contend with". In January 2016, he officially endorsed Bernie Sanders for president. He also described democratic socialism as "a true democracy where everyone has a seat at the table, everyone has a voice, not just the rich". After Sanders lost the 2016 primaries, Moore urged Americans to vote for Clinton while also correctly predicting that Trump would win the election because the post-industrial Midwestern states would vote for Trump. After Trump was elected, Moore called Trump a "Russian traitor", saying his presidency had "no legitimacy".

==== Other developments ====
In October 2016, Moore criticized Julian Assange and WikiLeaks for publishing leaks from the DNC's emails, saying: "I think WikiLeaks and I think Assange, they're essentially anarchists and they know, just like a lot of people voting for Trump know, that he's their human Molotov cocktail and they want to blow up the system. It's an anarchic move."

In November 2016, right after Donald Trump was elected President of the United States, and inspired by Bertram Gross's 1980 book, Friendly Fascism, Moore reportedly stated: "The next wave of fascists will not come with cattle cars and concentration camps, but they'll come with a smiley face and maybe a TV show ... That's how the 21st-century fascists will essentially take over."

=== Donald Trump ===
==== Trumpileaks ====
Moore expresses his political views in 2017 – video from MSNBC.

Moore started the website TrumpiLeaks in May 2017, to encourage whistleblowers to provide information about Donald Trump. Moore was inspired to create the site after witnessing the firings by Trump of three law enforcement officials, specifically: United States Attorney Preet Bharara, former acting United States Attorney General Sally Yates, and former Director of the Federal Bureau of Investigation James Comey. Moore posted a message to his personal website, explaining the motivation of the new venture and that he wanted any information related to: "crimes, breaches of public trust and misconduct committed by Donald J. Trump and his associates". He asserted, "Trump thinks he's above the law". Moore stated it was his view that Trump had engaged in obstruction of justice, falsehoods to the United States citizenry, promoted violent behavior, and violated the Constitution of the United States. Archives from the Wayback Machine shows that the Trumpileaks website was active from June 2017 to October 2018.

==== Criticism of corporate media ====
In March 2018, Moore criticized the "corporate media", saying "You turn on the TV, and it's 'Russia, Russia, Russia!' These are all shiny keys to distract us. We should know about the West Virginia strike. What an inspiration that would be. But they don't show this".

==== Calls for Trump's impeachment ====
In April 2018, Moore taunted Trump by ironically asking him why he had not already fired Robert Mueller. After the Russia–United States summit of July 2018, Moore called for Trump's impeachment, saying "Congress needs no more proof than Trump's admission yesterday that he sides with Putin to impeach and remove him."

Moore compared Trump to Nazi Germany's dictator Adolf Hitler. On August 10, 2019, Moore tweeted: "I guess they think a country dumb enough to elect Trump is stupid enough to believe Jeffrey Epstein committed suicide."

==== Further support for Bernie Sanders ====
In October 2019, he announced his political endorsement of Bernie Sanders in the 2020 Democratic Party presidential primaries. After Sanders lost the primaries, Moore urged Sanders supporters to vote for Joe Biden in the general election.

Support on Repealing 2nd Amendment

Michael Moore has explicitly advocated repealing the U.S. Second Amendment and replacing it with a new constitutional amendment.

== Personal life ==
Moore met Kathleen Glynn at the Flint Voice, and they married on October 19, 1991. He filed for divorce on June 17, 2013. On July 22, 2014, the divorce was finalized.

Moore is Catholic, but has differed with some of the traditional church teaching on subjects such as abortion and same-sex marriage. In an interview with The A.V. Club, when asked if there was a God, he stated, "Yes, there is. I don't know how you define that, but yeah."

Following the Columbine High School massacre, Moore acquired a lifetime membership to the National Rifle Association of America (NRA). Moore said that he initially intended to become the NRA's president to dismantle the organization, but he soon dismissed the plan as too difficult. Gun rights supporters such as Dave Kopel said there was no chance of that happening; David T. Hardy and Jason Clarke wrote that Moore failed to discover that the NRA selects a president not by membership vote but by a vote of the board of directors.

In 2005, Time named Moore one of the world's 100 most influential people. Later in 2005, Moore founded the Traverse City Film Festival held annually in Traverse City, Michigan. In 2009, he co-founded the Traverse City Comedy Festival, also held annually in Traverse City, where Moore helped to spearhead the renovation of the historic downtown State Theater.

== Criticism ==
Christopher Hitchens, a supporter of the Iraq War, described the film Fahrenheit 9/11 as "utterly propagandistic". In an article titled "The lies of Michael Moore" Hitchens rebuked Moore and his film for its contradictions and promotion of falsehoods. He also criticized Moore for his belief that Osama bin Laden should be considered innocent until proven guilty despite having taken credit for the September 11 attacks. Former Democratic mayor of New York City Ed Koch, who had endorsed Bush for re-election, wrote an op-ed in which he described Moore's film as propaganda. Koch further maintained that Fahrenheit 9/11 was replete with "blatant lies".

In 2003, The Wall Street Journal said that Bowling for Columbine was "filled with so many inaccuracies and distortions that it ought to be classed as a work of fiction." The Boston Review said the film contained "deliberate falsehoods", highlighting an interview in which Moore selectively edited and rearranged an interview with NRA president Charlton Heston to "create the stupid, callous white guy he attacks."

In 2009, Moore faced criticism for using non-union workers to produce his film Capitalism: A Love Story. After his 2014 divorce, Moore was reported to have nine homes and a net worth of $50 million. Aaron Foley, writing in Jalopnik, accused Moore of hypocrisy due to his anti-capitalist views.

In a review of Fahrenheit 11/9, a film critiquing Donald Trump, John Anderson wrote "Almost the entire movie is lifted from other sources, and then edited in a way that makes his enemies (do they know they're his enemies?) look as foolish as possible. ... Mr. Moore can't help himself, he uses footage of Adolf Hitler lip-syncing a Trump speech. Much has been made of Mr. Trump's questionable maturity. He has a kindred spirit in Michael Moore".

Conservative author Douglas Murray criticized Moore for stating that "Every problem in the world, look at it and behind it you've got white men". In response to his comments Murray said, "Michael Moore is one of those who doesn't realize that other people have agency and can muck up the world and their own countries in their own ways, and he's obviously never heard of numerous countries, including North Korea".

After the killing of Brian Thompson, former CEO of UnitedHealth Group, Reason wrote:

Eliding the question of whether it's appropriate to murder an apparently random executive as a synecdoche of the entire health insurance industry, Moore merely says the anger felt by Mangione and others is "1000% justified" and "I'm not going to tamp it down or ask people to shut up. I want to pour gasoline on that anger."

The alleged shooter of Thompson was found to have had in his possession at the time of being captured by law enforcement, a document in which the shooter cited two people, Moore and Elisabeth Rosenthal, as those who had "illuminated the corruption and greed" of the healthcare/health insurance industry.

In January 2025, Michael Moore's endorsement of the Palestinian anthology film From Ground Zero drew swift criticism from Christians United for Israel (CUFI), which accused the film of "populist propaganda" in an email campaign aimed at Academy voters and exhibitors and urged its removal from awards and theaters.

Moore dismissed CUFI's charge that the film downplays Hamas's October 7 attacks—insisting instead that "the shadow of October 7 hangs over the whole film" while blaming the Israeli government's policies for the suffering of civilians in the Gaza. His comments—and his warning about self-censorship in U.S. film distribution—sparked debate over the role of documentary filmmakers in political conflicts, earning both praise for his moral courage and criticism for perceived one-sidedness.

== Work ==
=== Filmography ===
| Year | Title | Director | Writer | Producer | Actor | Role | Notes |
|---|---|---|---|---|---|---|---|
| 1989 | Roger & Me | Yes | Yes | Yes | Yes | Himself | Documentary |
| 1991 | Blood in the Face | No | No | No | Yes | Himself | Documentary |
| 1992 | Pets or Meat: The Return to Flint | Yes | Yes | Yes | Yes | Himself | Documentary |
| 1995 | Canadian Bacon | Yes | Yes | Yes | Yes | Gun-toting Anti-Canadian Redneck (Note: During the TV broadcast about the increasing hostilities towards Canadians, Moore and his friend Ben Hamper appear as a pair of intense, gung-ho, redneck American citizens at the anti-Canada rally with a bunch of other gun-nut rednecks. Hamper is the one holding the microphone and the one that says "Everything I see or read about these Canadians makes me want to puke!" while Moore is the one holding the gun and the one that yells "It's time we put America back in North America! God bless Bud Boomer!") | Narrative film |
| 1997 | The Big One | Yes | Yes | No | Yes | Himself | Documentary |
| 1998 | And Justice for All | Yes | Yes | Yes | Yes | Himself | Documentary |
| 1999 | EDtv | No | No | No | Yes | Himself | Narrative film |
| 2000 | Lucky Numbers | No | No | No | Yes | Walter | Narrative film |
| 2001 | The Party's Over | No | No | No | Yes | Himself | Documentary |
| 2002 | Bowling for Columbine | Yes | Yes | Yes | Yes | Himself | Documentary |
| 2004 | The Corporation | No | No | No | Yes | Himself | Documentary |
| 2004 | Fahrenheit 9/11 | Yes | Yes | Yes | Yes | Himself | Documentary |
| 2004 | The Fever | No | No | No | Yes | Reporter | Narrative film |
| 2007 | Sicko | Yes | Yes | Yes | Yes | Himself | Documentary |
| 2007 | Captain Mike Across America | Yes | Yes | No | Yes | Himself | Documentary |
| 2008 | Slacker Uprising | Yes | Yes | No | Yes | Himself | Documentary; recut version of Captain Mike Across America |
| 2009 | Capitalism: A Love Story | Yes | Yes | Yes | Yes | Himself | Documentary |
| 2015 | Where to Invade Next | Yes | Yes | Yes | Yes | Himself | Documentary |
| 2016 | Michael Moore in TrumpLand | Yes | Yes | Yes | Yes | Himself | Documentary |
| 2018 | Fahrenheit 11/9 | Yes | Yes | Yes | Yes | Himself | Documentary |
| 2019 | Planet of the Humans | No | No | Executive | No | | Documentary |
| 2024 | From Ground Zero | No | No | Executive | No | | Anthology movie |
| 2025 | The Voice of Hind Rajab | No | No | Executive | No | | Narrative film |

=== Television ===
| Year | Title | Creator | Director | Writer | Producer | Host | Actor | Notes |
|---|---|---|---|---|---|---|---|---|
| 1994-1995 | TV Nation | Yes | Yes | Yes | Yes | Yes | No | NBC/Fox/BBC Two series |
| 1999-2000 | The Awful Truth | Yes | Yes | Yes | Yes | Yes | No | Bravo/Channel 4 series |
| 1999 | Michael Moore Live | Yes | Yes | Yes | Yes | Yes | No | Channel 4 Six-part miniseries |
| 2003 | The Simpsons | No | No | No | No | No | Yes | Role: Himself; Episode: The President Wore Pearls |

=== Music videos ===
- Rage Against the Machine: "Sleep Now in the Fire" (2000)
- Rage Against the Machine: "Testify" (2000)
- R.E.M.: All the Way to Reno (You're Gonna Be a Star)" (2001)
- System of a Down: "Boom!" (2003)
- The Nightwatchman: "Alone Without You" (2007)
- Prophets of Rage: "Unfuck the World" (2017)

=== Bibliography ===
- Moore, Michael (1996). Downsize This! Random Threats from an Unarmed American. New York: HarperPerennial. ISBN 0-06-097733-7.
- Moore, Michael; Glynn, Kathleen (1998). Adventures in a TV Nation. New York: HarperPerennial. ISBN 0-06-098809-6.
- Moore, Michael (2001). Stupid White Men ...and Other Sorry Excuses for the State of the Nation!. New York: Regan Books. ISBN 0-06-039245-2.
- Moore, Michael (2003). Dude, Where's My Country?. New York: Warner Books. ISBN 0-446-53223-1.
- Moore, Michael (2004). Will They Ever Trust Us Again?. New York: Simon & Schuster. ISBN 0-7432-7152-1.
- Moore, Michael (2004). The Official Fahrenheit 9/11 Reader. New York: Simon & Schuster. ISBN 0-7432-7292-7.
- Moore, Michael (2008). Mike's Election Guide 2008. New York: Grand Central Publishing. ISBN 978-0-446-54627-0.
- Moore, Michael (2011). Here Comes Trouble: Stories from My Life. New York: Grand Central Publishing. ISBN 978-0-446-53224-2.
  - 2012 (Audible: 2011): Here Comes Trouble: Stories from My Life (audiobook, read by Michael Moore), Grand Central Publishing, ISBN 978-1-61969-209-1

=== Podcasting ===
- RUMBLE with Michael Moore (2019–present)

== See also ==
- List of highest-grossing documentary films
