= Roger Smith (executive) =

Chairman and CEO of General Motors (1925–2007)

- Born: Roger Bonham Smith; July 12, 1925; Columbus, Ohio, U.S.
- Died: November 29, 2007 (aged 82); Detroit, Michigan, U.S.
- Education: University of Michigan
- Occupation: Automobile executive
- Known for: Chairman and CEO of General Motors

Roger Bonham Smith (July 12, 1925 – November 29, 2007) was the chairman and CEO of General Motors Corporation from 1981 to 1990, and is widely known as the main subject of Michael Moore's 1989 documentary film Roger & Me.

Smith seemed to be the last of the old-line GM chairmen, a conservative anonymous bureaucrat, resisting change. However, propelled by industry and market conditions, Smith oversaw some of the most fundamental changes in GM's history. When Smith took over GM, it was reeling from its first annual loss since the early 1920s. Its reputation had been tarnished by lawsuits, persistent quality problems, bad labor relations, public protests over the installation of Chevrolet engines in Oldsmobiles, and by a poorly designed diesel engine. GM was also losing market share to foreign automakers for the first time.

Deciding that GM needed to completely change its structure in order to be competitive, Smith instituted a sweeping transformation. Initiatives included divisional consolidation, forming strategic joint ventures with Japanese and Korean automakers, launching the Saturn division, investing heavily in technological automation and robotics, and attempting to rid the company of its risk-averse bureaucracy. However, Smith's far-reaching goals proved too ambitious to be implemented effectively in the face of the company's resistant corporate culture. Despite Smith's vision, he was unable to successfully integrate GM's major acquisitions and failed to tackle the root causes of GM's fundamental problems.

A controversial figure widely associated with GM's decline, Smith's tenure is commonly viewed as a failure, as GM's share of the U.S. market fell from 46% to 35% and the company lapsed close to bankruptcy during the early 1990s recession. Smith and his legacy remain subjects of considerable interest and debate among automotive writers and historians.

== Career ==
=== Beginnings with General Motors ===
Smith spent virtually his entire professional career working for General Motors. He was born in Columbus, Ohio, the son of Besse Belle (Obetz) and E. Quimby Smith. Smith earned his bachelor's degree in business administration at the University of Michigan in 1947, and his MBA at the University of Michigan's Ross School of Business in 1953. He served in the United States Navy from 1944 to 1946.

Smith began his career at GM in 1949 as an accounting clerk, and had become the company's treasurer by 1970, and vice president the following year. In 1974, Smith was elected executive vice president in charge of the financial, public relations, and government relations staffs. He ascended to GM's chairmanship in 1981.

==== Poletown plant controversy ====
In 1981, mayor Coleman Young and the city of Detroit won a notorious landmark decision in the Michigan Supreme Court, Poletown Neighborhood Council v. City of Detroit that allowed the city to use its eminent domain power to raze an existing immigrant neighborhood in neighboring Hamtramck. In order to transfer the land to GM for the construction of a new factory, the city condemned the homes of 4,200 residents as well as numerous churches, schools, and businesses, including the original Dodge assembly plant opened in 1914 by John and Horace Dodge for their then new 1915 Dodge Brothers car ("Dodge Main").

Although the deal predated Smith's tenure as chairman, he subsequently used the construction of the new Poletown factory, along with plants on a greenfield site in Lake Orion Michigan, and one in Wentzville, Missouri (an identical twin to Orion) to showcase the technology he felt would lead GM into a new era. Unfortunately, the factories failed to live up to their promise and since they were duplicates of existing GM factories, unable to flexibly produce different models, were ultimately panned by critics as obsolete on the day they opened.

=== Reorganizing General Motors ===
Smith began the reorganization of GM that would define his chairmanship (see below), with the 1981 creation of the worldwide Truck and Bus Group, consolidating the design, manufacture, sales and service of all trucks, buses and vans under one umbrella. 1982 saw the creation of the Truck and Bus Manufacturing Division, which combined all truck manufacturing and assembly operations from their former divisions, but still a separate bureaucracy from that of the Truck and Bus Group.

In 1982 Smith negotiated contract concessions with the United Auto Workers and cut planned raises for white-collar workers. After unveiling a more generous bonus program for top executives that provoked an angry response from the union, Smith was forced to back-pedal. Relations with the UAW, management, and stockholders remained strained. Profits improved in 1983 and Smith began unveiling his vision for reorganization, diversification, and "deindustrialization."

One of the most controversial decisions made during Smith's tenure was the partial elimination of divisional autonomy in 1984. In the 1920s, chairman and CEO Alfred Sloan, Jr. had established semi-autonomous divisions within the corporation, each designing and marketing their own vehicles (Chevrolet, Pontiac, Oldsmobile, Buick and Cadillac). This was considered a crucial factor propelling GM past market leader Ford in the 1930s. By the 1980s however, that autonomy (also including Fisher Body division producing the car bodies, and GM Assembly division building them) were seen as representing a dated business model that had led to needless large scale redundancy, infighting by the divisions, and a bloated internal bureaucracy.

==== 1984 reorganization ====
Smith took on the massive GM bureaucracy with disastrous results. A sea change in how GM would market and build cars in the future, the 1984 reorganization was intended to streamline the process and create greater efficiencies; the reverse actually occurred. Combining the nameplate divisions, Fisher Body, and GM Assembly into two groups, C-P-C (Chevrolet, Pontiac, Canada) to build small cars and B-O-C (Buick, Oldsmobile, Cadillac) to build large cars, the effort was subsequently criticized for creating chaos within the company. Longstanding informal relationships which had greased the wheels of GM were severed, seemingly overnight, leading to confusion and slipping new product programs. The reorganization virtually stopped GM in its tracks for 18 months, and never really worked as intended, with the CPC division building Cadillacs and BOC building Pontiacs. The reorganization added costs and created more layers of bureaucracy when the new groups added management, marketing and engineering staff, duplicating existing staff at both the corporate and division levels. Almost ten years elapsed before the 1984 reorganization was unwound and all car groups were combined into one division.

By the 1990s, GM's program of sharing components across divisions that began in the 70s as a way to cut costs grew into a marketing problem. After the 1984 reorganization forced teamwork by the divisions, parts sharing evolved into wholesale sharing of entire designs and simply re-badging vehicles for each division. Observers suggested differences between automobiles produced and marketed by the Chevy, Buick, and Oldsmobile divisions were less distinct as a consequence. Automotive commentators cited a lack of a distinct brand identity and demographic changes as crucial factors in the demise of the Oldsmobile division in 2004. Compounding GM's problems was the fact while entire platforms shared designs, the engineered parts beneath the surface, where customers did not care or did not notice were often not shared, which is where money could be saved. Analyst David Cole summed it up: "The engineering was 180 degrees out of phase. GM cars looked alike outside but were all different inside."

==== GM10 debacle ====
Smith's major new car program prior to the 1984 reorganization, GM10 (also known as W-body), has been called "The biggest catastrophe in American industrial history." Beginning in 1982, and costing $7 billion, the plan was to replace all midsize cars produced by Chevrolet, Pontiac, Oldsmobile, and Buick. The plan was huge in scope, calling for seven plants that would each assemble 250,000 of the cars, or 21% of the total U.S. car market. It was badly executed from the start, but the 1984 reorganization wrought havoc on the program and it never recovered. By 1989, the year before the last of the original GM10s were launched, GM was losing $2000 on every one of the cars it produced. When asked by Fortune why GM10 was such a catastrophe, Smith replied, “I don't know. It's a mysterious thing. I've said I'll take my share of the blame on all those things. I was part of the team.” Nonetheless, the W-body platform that sprouted from the GM10 program lasted in production in some form until 2016.

==== Drive for modernization ====
A defining theme of Smith's tenure was his vision to modernize GM using advanced technology. Some have suggested he was ahead of his time in attempting to create a 21st-century organization in a company not ready for the technology. "Lights out" factories were envisioned, where the only employees were those supervising the robots and computers. This was obviously viewed negatively by the unions, and further strained relations. Over the decade of the 1980s, GM spent upwards of $90 billion attempting to remake itself, including a 1981 joint venture with the Japanese robot manufacturer, Fujitsu-Fanuc. With the resulting venture, GMF Robotics, GM became the largest manufacturer of robots in the world. Unfortunately, the experience failed to meet the vision, with the new robots famously painting each other instead of the cars, or robots welding doors shut. Ultimately, some robotic systems and automation installed in several plants were removed shortly after their installation. The astonishing sums expended were widely viewed as money wasted. Responding to a 1986 report on 3-year capital expenditures projected at almost $35 billion, VP of finance F. Alan Smith (no relation) opined the sum could be better spent on purchasing both Toyota and Nissan resulting in a bump in market share overnight and openly questioned whether the proposed capital expenditures would pay the same dividends; they did not. By the time Smith retired, GM had evolved from the lowest cost producer in Detroit to its highest cost producer, due in part to the drive to acquire advanced technology that never paid dividends in efficiency.

==== Acquisitions and divestitures ====
In 1984 Smith oversaw General Motors' acquisition of Electronic Data Systems from its founder Ross Perot for $2.55 billion, serving two purposes. First was the opportunity to modernize and automate GM to fulfill Smith's goals; second, it was an effort to broaden out of its manufacturing base and into technology and services. As a result of the EDS acquisition, Perot became GM's largest single shareholder, joined its board of directors, and immediately became a source of friction to Smith and a vocal and public critic of Smith and GM's management. In 1986 Smith and the board orchestrated a $743 million buyout of Perot's GM stock at a substantial premium over the market value of the shares. Perot accepted the buyout, but publicly denounced the expenditure as outrageous at a time GM was closing plants and laying off workers. He announced that he would put the money in escrow to give the automaker a chance to reconsider, but never actually sequestered the funds.

This merger is described in detail in the book Call Me Roger by Albert Lee, a former GM speechwriter. The structure of the deal was unusual in that EDS would be owned by GM, but Smith promised it would allow Perot autonomy to run the company. In addition, the stock of EDS became a special 'Class E' GM stock, which was separate from normal GM stock, an arrangement which almost got GM kicked off the NYSE. Perot eventually agreed to the deal, because, as Lee puts it, he was sold on the idea of saving millions of American jobs by helping GM fight off Japanese competition.

The relationship between Smith, Perot, and the EDS executives ruptured openly in September 1985, during a meeting in Dallas that brought the EDS executive compensation issue to a head. Smith was reluctant to accept the EDS plan, substituting a plan of his own. Described in Irreconcilable Differences by Doron Levin, EDS' CFO was explaining to Smith how they felt GM's plan was inferior, when Smith lost his temper. "People in the room later would remember Smith's angry explosion as being wondrous and terrifying at the same time: wondrous for the extreme colors and sounds it brought to the room, terrifying because none of them had ever seen someone lose his temper so completely in a business meeting. The EDS officers stared in disbelief as the chairman of the world's biggest and most powerful company lost it."

What ensued was one of the most vitriolic corporate battles of the 1980s, with Perot and Smith publicly exchanging barbs using the media, which delightedly splashed the story over every business publication in the U.S.. Perot notoriously lashed out at Smith in a 1988 exclusive to Fortune Magazine, saying: "My question is: Why haven't we unleashed their potential? The answer is: the General Motors system. It's like a blanket of fog that keeps these people from doing what they know needs to be done. I come from an environment where, if you see a snake, you kill it. At GM, if you see a snake, the first thing you do is go hire a consultant on snakes. Then you get a committee on snakes, and then you discuss it for a couple of years. The most likely course of action is—nothing. You figure, the snake hasn't bitten anybody yet, so you just let him crawl around on the factory floor. We need to build an environment where the first guy who sees the snake kills it." Perot went on to needle Smith regarding the opulent 25th floor GM offices in New York, "An entire teak forest must have been decimated for that floor". Smith, who had obviously ignored the irony of the CEO of the largest public corporation in the world complaining about the opulence of the private office (which Perot had personally paid to furnish) of a rival, had responded to Perot's frequent criticism of GM's executive perks a year earlier, "Perot's office (in Dallas) 'makes mine look like a shanty-town. He has Remingtons; he has a Gilbert Stuart painting hanging on the wall. Nobody runs around saying 'Get rid of Ross's office''".

A second large acquisition outside the automobile industry followed in 1985, when Smith announced the purchase of Hughes Aircraft Company from the Howard Hughes Medical Institute for $5.2 billion. The company was then merged with GM's Delco Electronics to form Hughes Electronics.

Smith's purchases of EDS and Hughes were criticized as unwise diversions of resources at a time when GM could have invested more in its core automotive divisions. GM spun EDS off as an independent company in 1996. After some major acquisitions in the mid-1990s by Hughes Electronics (Magnavox Electronic Systems and PanAmSat), GM divested most of Hughes assets from 1997 to 2003, including sale of defense operations to Raytheon in 1997, the spinoff of Delphi Automotive Systems in 1999, the divestiture of Hughes Space and Communications to Boeing in 2000, and acquisition of the remaining communications and satellite operations (mostly DirecTV) by NewsCorp in 2003.

=== Solar Challenge ===
In 1987, Smith chose to have GM enter in the first World Solar Challenge race and he hired AeroVironment to build a winning solar-electric vehicle. The resulting car, the Sunraycer easily won the race at a cost of just under 2 million dollars. The success of the Sunraycer led directly to the AeroVironment-designed GM Impact prototype, subsequently planned for 25,000 vehicles, which in turn led to the EV-1.

== Legacy ==
In 2009, Portfolio.com called Smith one of the worst American CEOs of All Time," stating, "Smith...had the right idea but may have lacked the intuition to understand how his rip-up-the-carpet redo would affect the delicate web of informal communication that GM relied upon." In 2013, he was included on Fortune's list of the "10 Worst Auto Chiefs," with writer Alex Taylor III stating, "He wasted billions trying to revive the sagging giant through diversification (EDS and Hughes), automation (robotized factories), reorganization (two superdivisions B-O-C and C-P-C), commonization (GM-10 cars) and experimentation (Saturn). Smith's legacy was a fleet of lookalike autos, an unqualified successor, and a mountain of debt that pushed the company close to bankruptcy in 1992."

== Personal life ==
Smith served as chairman of The Business Council in 1989 and 1990. His tenure at GM ended in 1990, one year after the release of the popular underground documentary Roger & Me, where many displaced GM workers called for Smith's retirement. Smith voluntarily retired from GM, and later toured the new Saturn facility in Tennessee, which he brought to fruition, in 1991.

A native of Columbus, Ohio, Smith was married for 53 years to his wife Barbara. They had two sons, Roger B. Smith and Drew J. Smith; two daughters, Jennifer A. Ponski and Victoria B. Sawula; as well as six grandchildren.

Smith died on November 29, 2007, after an unspecified short illness.

Business positions
Preceded by Thomas A. Murphy	Chairman of General Motors; 1981–1990	Succeeded by Robert C. Stempel
Preceded by Thomas A. Murphy	CEO of General Motors; 1981–1990	Succeeded by Robert C. Stempel
