= Victor G. Rodwin =

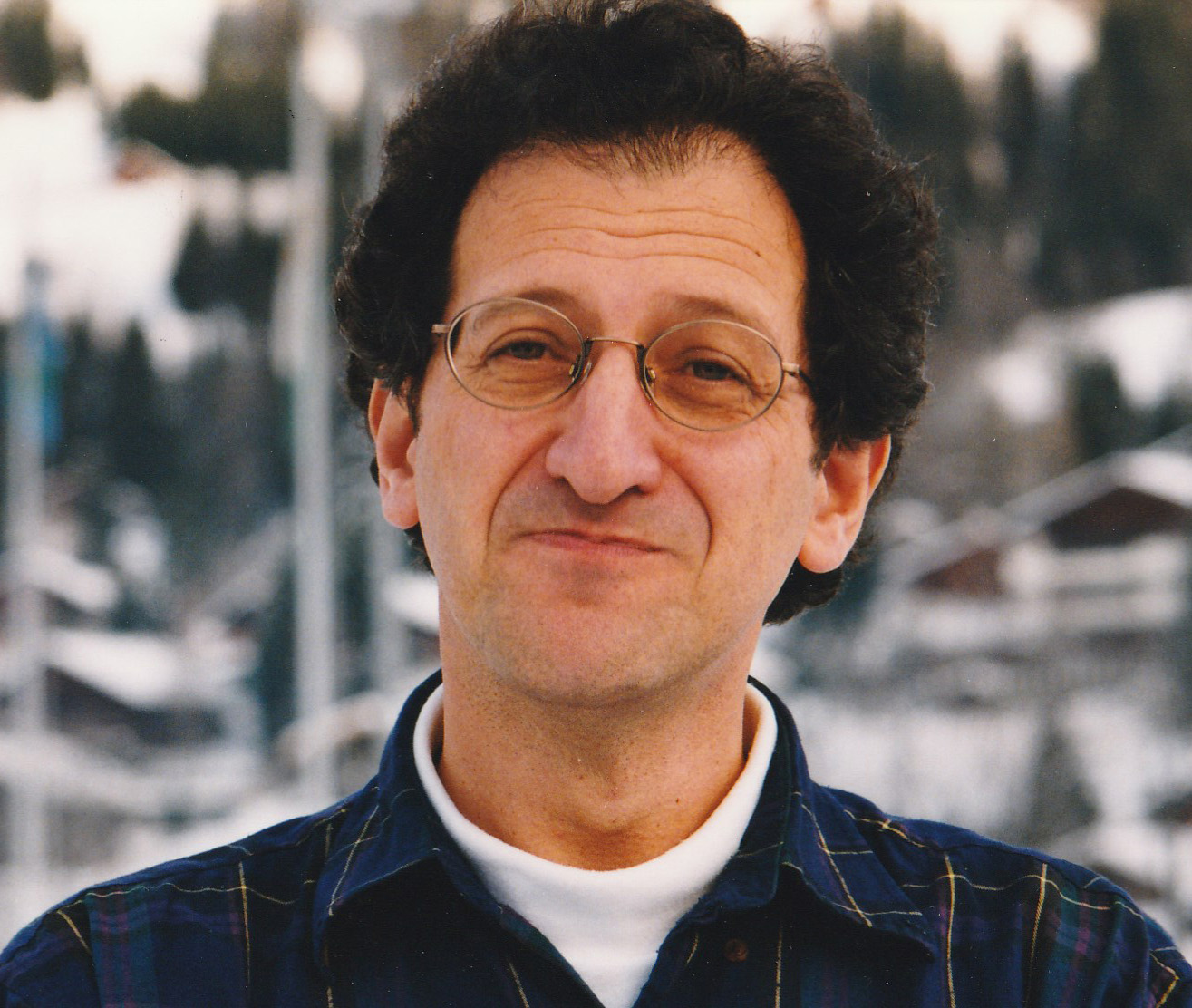
- Victor G. Rodwin (1999)

Personal details
- Education: University of California, Berkeley; Saint Petersburg State University; University of Wisconsin, Madison
- Profession: Academic, researcher
- Website: wagner.nyu.edu/community/faculty/victor-g-rodwin

Victor G. Rodwin is professor of health policy and management at the Robert. F Wagner Graduate School of Public Service, New York University where he has taught since 1985. He is also co-director, with Michael Gusmano, of the World Cities Project, a joint venture of NYU Wagner, The Hastings Center, and the Rutgers University School of Public Health.

== Biography ==
Rodwin was born in Boston, Massachusetts, and earned his B.A in Economics from the University of Wisconsin, Madison. His Ph.D. in city and regional planning, and his MPH in public health, were earned at the University of California, Berkeley. From 1983 to 1985 he was assistant professor of Health Policy at the University of California, San Francisco. Rodwin has been a member of the Academy for Social Insurance since 1998.

== Research ==
Rodwin has collaborated with French colleagues on healthcare system reform and health policy, and has written a book and numerous articles on healthcare organization and financing in France. His work on France also includes two edited books with Jean de Kervasdoué and John Kimberly: La santé rationnée and The End of an Illusion: The Future of Health Policy in Western Industrialized Nations and a book (with Didier Tabuteau), A la Santé del’Oncle Sam. He also published several articles, co-authored with French colleagues, including Les réseaux de soins coordonnés:pour une réforme profonde du système de santé (with JC Stephan, R. Launois and B.Majoni-d’Intignano); Health care under French national health insurance (with Simone Sandier); Healthcare reform in France: The birth of state-led managed care (with Claude Le Pen). This body of work provided the basis for his testimony to the Senate Subcommittee on Primary Health Care and Ageing. Rodwin is a member of the BRIC Seminar at the Ecole des Hautes Etudes en Sciences Sociales, the National Academy of Social Insurance, and serves on the advisory board of the Journal of Comparative Policy Analysis, the International Journal of Health Policy and Management, and the Revue Française des Affaires Sociales.

Rodwin's work on world cities has resulted in numerous publications including two books: Growing Older in World Cities and Health Care in World Cities.

== Professional activities ==
Before launching the World Cities Project with the assistance of a Health Policy Investigator Award from the Robert Wood Johnson Foundation on Megacities and Health, Rodwin studied health planning and policy in France, Québec, England and the United States. His research on the French healthcare system led him to work as advisor/consultant to many French health care institutions, including the Assistance Publique-Hopitaux de Paris, one of the largest public hospital systems in the world, the French National Health Insurance Fund (Caisse Nationale d’Assurance Maladie des Travailleurs Salariés), the National Health Insurance Fund for Agricultural Workers (Mutualité Sociale Agricole), and the Agency for Supporting Performance of Healthcare Institutions (Agence Nationale d’Appui pour la Performance des Etablissements de Santé et Médico-Sociaux).
