= Sicko =

2007 documentary film by Michael Moore

- Theatrical release poster
- Directed by: Michael Moore
- Written by: Michael Moore
- Produced by: Michael Moore; Megan O'Hara
- Starring: Michael Moore
- Narrated by: Michael Moore
- Cinematography: Jayme Roy; Andrew Black
- Edited by: Geoffrey Richman; Christopher Seward; Dan Swietlik
- Music by: Erin O'Hara
- Production company: Dog Eat Dog Films
- Distributed by: Lionsgate; The Weinstein Company
- Release dates: May 19, 2007 (Cannes); June 22, 2007 (United States)
- Running time: 123 minutes
- Country: United States
- Language: English
- Budget: $9 million
- Box office: $36 million

Sicko is a 2007 American political documentary film by filmmaker Michael Moore. Investigating health care in the United States, the film focuses on the country's health insurance and the pharmaceutical industry. Moore compares the for-profit non-universal U.S. system with the non-profit universal health care systems of Canada, the United Kingdom, France and Cuba.

Produced on a roughly $9 million budget, Sicko grossed $25 million theatrically in North America. This exceeded the official expectation of The Weinstein Company, which had hoped to be in line with Bowling for Columbine's $22 million U.S. box office gross.

== Synopsis ==
Sicko begins by noting that almost 50 million Americans were uninsured in 2007 while the remainder, who are covered, are often victims of insurance company fraud and red tape. Sicko mentions that the World Health Organization ranks U.S. health in general as 37 out of 191 countries and ranks some U.S. health measures, such as infant mortality and life expectancy, as equal to countries with much less economic wealth. Interviews are conducted with people who thought they had adequate coverage but were denied care. Former employees of insurance companies describe cost-cutting initiatives that give bonuses to insurance company physicians and others to find reasons for the company to avoid meeting the cost of medically necessary treatments for policy holders, and thus increase company profitability.

The history of the American health care debate serves as a backdrop. Opponents of universal health care are set in the context of 1950s-style anti-communist propaganda. A 1961 record distributed by the American Medical Association, narrated by corporate spokesmodel Ronald Reagan, warns that universal health care could lead to lost freedoms and socialism. In response, Moore shows that socialized public services like police, fire service, the United States Postal Service, public education and community libraries have not led to communism in the United States.

=== Canada ===
In Canada, a citizen describes the case of Tommy Douglas, who was voted the greatest Canadian in 2004 for his contributions to the Canadian health system. Moore also interviews a microsurgeon and people waiting in the emergency room of a Canadian public hospital.

=== HMO origin in the 1970s ===
The origins of the Health Maintenance Organization Act of 1973 are presented using a taped conversation between President Richard Nixon and his aide, John Ehrlichman, on February 17, 1971; Ehrlichman is heard telling Nixon that "the less care they give them, the more money they make", a plan that Nixon remarked was "fine" and "not bad". This led to the expansion of the modern health maintenance organization-based health care system. Connections are highlighted between Pharmaceutical Research and Manufacturers of America (PhRMA), the lobbying arm of the largest drug companies in the United States, lobbying groups in Washington, D.C., and the Congress. Hillary Clinton, a champion of the Clinton health care plan, is shown as a crusader for change, appointed to reform the health care system in the United States by her husband, newly elected President Bill Clinton. Her efforts are met with heavy-handed criticisms by Republicans on Capitol Hill and right-wing media throughout the country, who characterize her plan as the harbinger of socialism. When she is defeated, her punishment is to "never speak of it again while in the White House." Seven years later, her silence is rewarded, as she becomes a senator with the help of healthcare industry contributions, the second largest recipient in the Senate.

=== United Kingdom ===
In the United Kingdom, a country whose National Health Service is a comprehensive publicly funded health care system, Moore interviews patients and inquires about in-hospital expenses incurred by patients, only to be told that there are no out-of-pocket payments. Moore visits a typical UK pharmacy, where pharmaceuticals are free of charge for all persons in Northern Ireland, Scotland and Wales and under 16, 16–17 in full-time education, disabled, unemployed, or over 60 in England, and subsidized in most cases for everyone else (in England); only a fixed amount of £6.65 (about $10) per item on a prescription was charged, irrespective of cost to the NHS. Further, NHS hospitals employ a cashier, part of whose job is to reimburse low-income patients for their out-of-pocket travel costs to the hospital. Interviews include an NHS general practitioner, an American woman residing in London, and former British politician Tony Benn, who compares a hypothetical dismantling of the NHS to ending women's suffrage and says it would lead to a revolution.

=== France ===
In France, Moore visits a hospital and interviews the head of obstetrics and gynaecology and a group of American expatriates. Moore rides with the "SOS Médecins", a 24-hour French medical service that provides house calls by physicians. Moore discovers that the French government provides many social services and rights in addition to health care, such as daycare for $1 an hour, free college education, a minimum five weeks paid vacation by law, vacation, and neonatal support that includes cooking, cleaning, and laundry services for new mothers.

=== Return to US ===
Returning to the United States, interviews disclose that 9/11 rescue workers who volunteered after the September 11, 2001 attacks were denied government funds to care for physical and psychological illnesses they subsequently developed, including respiratory disease and PTSD-induced bruxism. Unable to receive and afford medical care in the United States, the 9/11 rescue workers, as well as all of Moore's friends in the film needing medical attention, set sail from Miami to Cuba on three speedboats in order to obtain free medical care provided for the detainees at the U.S. Guantanamo Bay detainment camp.

=== Cuba ===
The group arrives at the entrance channel to "Gitmo" and Moore uses a megaphone to request access, pleading for the 9/11 victims to receive treatment that is on par with the medical attention the detainees are receiving. The attempt ceases when a siren is blown from the base, and the group moves on to Havana, where they purchase inexpensive medicine and receive free medical treatment at Hermanos Ameijeiras Hospital. Providing only their names and birth dates, the rescue workers are hospitalized and receive medical attention. Before they leave, the 9/11 rescue workers are honored by a local Havana fire station.

Finally, Moore addresses the audience, emphasizing that people should be "taking care of each other, no matter the differences." To demonstrate his personal commitment to this theme, Moore decides to help one of his biggest critics, Jim Kenefick. According to a blog posting, Kenefick feared he would have to shut down his anti-Moore website because he needed US$12,000 to cover the costs of medical treatment for his sick wife. Not wanting the U.S. health care system to limit Kenefick's ability to express his opinion, Moore sends Kenefick the money himself.

This film ends with Moore walking towards the United States Capitol with a basket full of his clothes, sarcastically saying he will get the government to do his laundry until a better day comes for the sick and hopeless who are unable to receive health care.

== Cast ==
- Michael Moore as himself
- Billy Tauzin as himself
- Jacques Milliez as himself
- Linda Peeno as herself

== Laws discussed ==
- Medicare Prescription Drug, Improvement, and Modernization Act of 2003

== Release ==
Sicko premiered on May 19, 2007, at the 2007 Cannes Film Festival, receiving a 17-minute standing ovation from 2,000 people at the Grand Theatre Lumiere. The North American première of Sicko was held in London, Ontario (where some scenes from the movie were filmed), at the Silver City movie theatre at Masonville Place on June 8, 2007, with Moore in attendance. It also had an early première in Washington, D.C., on June 20, two days before its U.S. release, with Moore appearing at a Capitol Hill press conference to promote the film.

The European première was held in Great Britain on October 24, 2007, at the Odeon Leicester Square as part of the 51st London Film Festival. Moore was to introduce the film, but remained in the United States due to a 'family issue', sending a lengthy letter to be read in his absence. Part of the letter gave thanks to the Rt Hon. Tony Benn, featured in the film, who delivered a short speech before the showing.

On December 13, 2024, following the killing of health insurance executive Brian Thompson, which renewed public criticism of the health insurance industry, Moore made Sicko available to all on his official YouTube channel, arguing for health care reform as a "solution that does not involve any violence".

=== Box office ===
Made on a budget of $9 million, Sicko earned $4.5 million on its opening weekend. In 441 theaters, it took in an average of $10,204 per theater, the second-highest average gross of the weekend. As of February 24, 2008, Sicko has grossed $25 million in the United States and $11 million in foreign markets. Overall, the movie has made over $36 million. The film was also a huge success in DVD sales, in which it accumulated over $60 million in sales.

=== Critical reaction ===
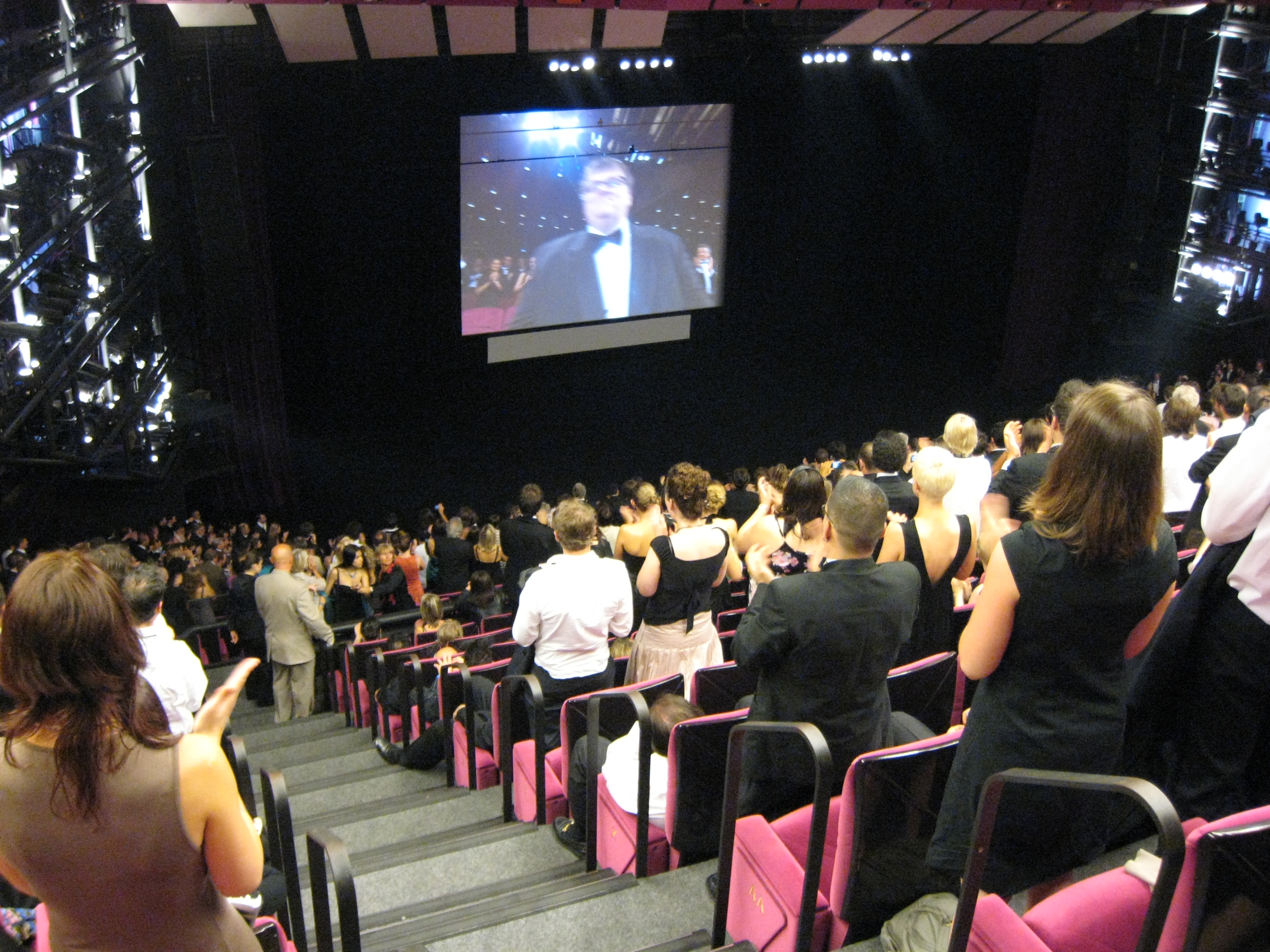
Michael Moore at the 2007 Cannes Film Festival receiving a standing ovation for Sicko

According to the review aggregator Rotten Tomatoes, the film boasts a 91% positive rating, based on 217 reviews, with an average rating of 7.71/10. The website's critical consensus reads, "Driven by Michael Moore's sincere humanism, Sicko is a devastating, convincing, and very entertaining documentary about the state of America's health care." Metacritic reported the film had an average score of 74 out of 100, based on 39 reviews, indicating "generally favorable reviews". After its Cannes release, Variety described Sicko as "an affecting and entertaining dissection of the American health care industry".

In an early review a week before the premiere, Richard Roeper and Michael Phillips gave the film two thumbs up. Roger Friedman of Fox News called the film a "brilliant and uplifting new film" and praised Moore for the way in which he lets "very articulate average Americans tell their personal horror stories at the hands of insurance companies" and "criticizes both Democrats and Republicans for their inaction and in some cases their willingness to be bribed by pharmaceutical companies and insurance carriers."

British film magazine Empire praised Moore's filmmaking and personal artistic vision, exclaiming "Sicko is the film that truly reveals Moore as an auteur."

David Denby of the New Yorker called the film "feeble, even inane", but film critic Stephen Schaefer of The Boston Globe described Sicko as "a very strong and very honest film about a health system that's totally corrupt and that is without any care for its patients".

The film was listed as the 4th best film of 2007 by Carina Chocano of Los Angeles Times, as well as 8th best by Marjorie Baumgarten of The Austin Chronicle.

=== Awards ===
Sicko was nominated for an Academy Award for Best Documentary Feature and Moore was nominated for the Writers Guild of America Award for Best Documentary Screenplay. It was also commended in the Australian Film Critics Association 2007 Film Award for Best Documentary.

== Response ==
=== News media ===
Journalist and free market advocate John Stossel wrote an article in the Wall Street Journal that claimed Julie Pierce's husband, Tracy, featured in Sicko, would not have been saved by the bone marrow transplant denied by his insurer. Stossel also questioned whether this treatment would have been given in a universal health care system, citing rationing and long waiting lists in Canada and Britain. Julie Pierce claimed Stossel never contacted her or her husband's doctors, and that the insurer denied other treatments as well and questioned Stossel's assertion that Tracy would not have received this in a socialized system, arguing that they are performed more frequently in Canada than in the U.S.

Moore insisted in the movie as well as in an interview with Stossel that the treatment provided in the Hermanos Ameijeiras Hospital was just like that given to any Cuban; but Stossel's investigations led Stossel to conclude that the hospital provided service only for the Cuban elite and that this care was not available to the average Cuban. In response to criticism that only well-to-do Cuban citizens receive a decent standard of health care, Michael Moore adduced on his website the result of an independent Gallup Poll in which "a near unanimous 96 percent of respondents say that health care in Cuba is accessible to everyone". An article in the Miami Herald interviewing some Cuban exiles in the United States criticized Sicko for painting a rosy picture of the Cuban healthcare system.

In an article published in both The New Yorker and Reason magazine, Michael C. Moynihan called the film "touching, naïve and maddeningly mendacious, a clumsy piece of agitprop that will likely have little lasting effect on the health care debate". Surgeon and Associate Director of Brigham and Women's Hospital's Center for Surgery and Public Health Atul Gawande commented, "Sicko is a revelation. And what makes this especially odd to say is that the movie brings to light nothing that the media haven’t covered extensively for years."

Kurt Loder criticized the film as presenting cherry-picked facts, manipulative interviews, and unsubstantiated assertions. While admitting that the U.S. health care system needs reform, Loder criticized Moore's advocacy of government control, arguing that many services controlled by the government are not considered efficient by the American public. Loder points to a 2005 film, Dead Meat, by Stuart Browning and Blaine Greenberg, which documents long waiting lists for care in Canada. Loder points to calls for reform in Britain and France due to the same rationing.

USA Today's Richard Wolf said, "Sicko uses omission, exaggeration and cinematic sleight of hand to make its points."

WBAI Radio, part of the Pacifica Radio Network, reported that Sicko was revitalizing the debate for universal health care within the United States, calling the film "adrenaline for healthcare activists."

=== Healthcare industry ===
In a letter responding to a Wall Street Journal op-ed by David Gratzer that was critical of the film, Robert S. Bell, M.D., President and CEO of University Health Network, Toronto, said that while Moore "exaggerated the performance of the Canadian health system", it provides universal coverage of a similar quality to that enjoyed by only some Americans. Michael Moore posted a leaked memo from a Capital Blue Cross employee about the likely consequences of the film. The memo expresses concern that the movie turns people against Capital Blue Cross by linking it to abuses by for-profit HMOs.

A July 9, 2007 broadcast of CNN's The Situation Room aired a "fact check" segment by CNN's senior health correspondent Dr. Sanjay Gupta on Sicko. Immediately following the segment, Moore was interviewed live on CNN by Wolf Blitzer. Moore stated that Gupta's report was inaccurate and biased. Moore posted a point-by-point response on his website. After a debate with Moore on Larry King Live, Gupta posted a message about his position on Sicko and CNN's coverage.

==== Wendell Potter ====
Wendell Potter admitted that while he was working as Head of Corporate Communications at CIGNA, the health insurance industry umbrella agency America's Health Insurance Plans had developed a campaign to discredit Michael Moore and the movie. When asked what he thought about the film Potter said that "I thought that he hit the nail on the head with his movie. But the industry, from the moment that the industry learned that Michael Moore was taking on the health care industry, it was really concerned ... They were afraid that people would believe Michael Moore."

Journalist Bill Moyers reported that PBS had obtained a copy of the "game plan" that was adopted by the industry's trade association, America's Health Insurance Plans which spelled out the industry strategies to "highlight horror stories of government-run systems". Potter explained, "The industry has always tried to make Americans think that government-run systems are the worst thing that could possibly happen to them, that even if you consider that, you're heading down on the slippery slope towards socialism. So they have used scare tactics for years and years and years, to keep that from happening. If there were a broader program like our Medicare program now, it could potentially reduce the profits of these big companies. So that is their biggest concern."

Moyers reported and Potter confirmed that there were attempts to radicalize Moore in an effort to discredit the film's message. Moore would be referred to as a "Hollywood entertainer" or "Hollywood moviemaker" to associate the film as being grounded in entertainment without any basis in objective reality. "They would want you to see this as just some fantasy that a Hollywood filmmaker had come up with. That's part of the strategy." Potter said that the strategy worked and the impact of the film was "blunted" by the public relations campaign. He agreed that Sicko contained "a great truth" which he said was "that we shouldn't fear government involvement in our health care system. That there is an appropriate role for government, and it's been proven in the countries that were in that movie. You know, we have more people who are uninsured in this country than the entire population of Canada. And that if you include the people who are underinsured, more people than in the United Kingdom. We have huge numbers of people who are also just a lay-off away from joining the ranks of the uninsured, or being purged by their insurance company, and winding up there."

=== Think tanks ===
The free-market think tanks, such as the Manhattan Institute, say that Sicko misrepresented the health systems of Canada, the United Kingdom and Cuba, and criticized it for its negative portrayal of the American health insurance system compared to these countries.

The National Center for Policy Analysis, a conservative American think tank, has also been critical of Moore's claims, focusing particularly on lengthy waiting lists and unavailability of new treatments in the publicly funded health systems of the United Kingdom and Canada, an aspect of those systems which they allege Moore failed to address.

The left-of-center/liberal-leaning Urban Institute (UI) largely agreed with Moore regarding the need for a universal health care system and failure of the current system. Urban Institute economist Linda Blumberg stated that Moore correctly provides evidence that the current system fails and a universal system is needed, adding that any system will face budget constraints. Overall, Blumberg stated that "Americans as a whole have yet to buy the philosophy that health care is a right and not a privilege" and if Moore succeeded in popularizing the idea, he "will have done the country a tremendous service." Bradford Gary agrees with the main points made by Moore but criticizes the film for making various omissions and lacking attention to detail, stating that "though Moore is not interested in the details behind the outrages he has assembled, many of his fundamental points are nevertheless accurate."

=== Moorewatch ===
Regarding Moore's donation to Jim and Donna Kenefick of Moorewatch.com, while Donna Kenefick thanked Moore, saying his money "paid for our health insurance premiums and gave us the financial breathing room to both deal with our debts", Jim Kenefick disputed Moore's account of these events, saying that his insurance would have paid for his wife's needs, and that his sites were in operation again thanks to reader donations long before he ever received Moore's check. Kenefick accused Moore of presenting his words out of context in order to defame him, and both Kenefick and his onetime co-blogger, Lee, criticized Moore for claiming to make this donation anonymously, only to highlight it in his film. They accuse him of being motivated by a desire for publicity and self-aggrandizement rather than altruism.

At a Cannes press conference, after the identity of the donor was revealed, Moore said: "I had to ask myself, 'Would you write this check if this wasn't in the film?'. I decided this is what I would do, and what I should do, and this is the way I want Americans to live."

=== WikiLeaks cable on Cuba and Sicko ===
Sicko was shown in theaters throughout Cuba and on national TV. Despite this, former United States Interests Section in Havana chief Michael E. Parmly wrote a diplomatic cable on January 31, 2008, which in part read:

XXXXXXXXXXXX stated that Cuban authorities have banned Michael Moore's movie, Sicko, as being subversive. Although the film's intent is to discredit the U.S. healthcare system by highlighting the excellence of the Cuban system, he said the regime knows the film is a myth and does not want to risk a popular backlash by showing to Cubans facilities that are clearly not available to the vast majority of them.

The Guardian newspaper, which collaborated with WikiLeaks, who leaked the cable, initially reported the cable's claim as fact, then printed that Moore complained about the factual error, and finally The Guardian printed a correction, confirming the film was in fact shown in Cuba. Moore argued that US officials simply made up the story to discredit the film as it portrays the US healthcare system in a negative light.

== Legal controversy ==
=== Unauthorized distribution ===
The film was leaked onto the Internet two weeks before its official release on June 29, 2007. Moore denied leaking the film for publicity, and an investigation was made into the source of the Internet leak. When asked about the leak, Moore said, "I'm just happy that people get to see my movies. I'm not a big supporter of the copyright laws in this country ... I don't understand bands or filmmakers ... who oppose sharing, having their work being shared by people, because it only increases your fanbase."

=== Treasury Department probe ===
In a May 2, 2007 letter, the Office of Foreign Assets Control informed Moore that he was the subject of a civil investigation stemming from the filmmaker's March trip to Cuba. In the letter to Moore, a Treasury official noted that the department had no record of Moore obtaining a license that authorized him to "engage in travel-related transactions involving Cuba", alleging that Moore violated the United States embargo against Cuba. A duplicate master copy of the film was held in Canada in case an attempt was made by American authorities to seize the film as part of the investigation against Moore that arose from taking the American 9/11 rescue workers to Cuba for medical treatment. Moore has said that trips made for conducting journalism are usually covered under a general license, which does not require preauthorization by the State Department. Moore states that his intentions were to travel to the US Naval base in Guantánamo Bay. Upon Moore's arrival at Guantánamo Bay, a siren was sounded and Moore decided to turn around for safety.

On The Tonight Show, Moore reported that he was notified that a subpoena regarding his trip to Cuba had already been issued. According to an anonymous source reported by Reuters, Moore has not been served; rather, the government contacted his attorney, David Boies, to discuss the logistics of serving a subpoena.

== Deleted scenes and extras ==
The DVD release includes deleted segments that Moore filmed but did not use in the theatrical release. Several scenes from the section about health care in the United Kingdom feature footage of a homeless shelter where people received acupuncture and foot massages. Discarded scenes in France include an interview with an employee from General Electric, who tells Moore they get benefits in France that GE employees do not receive in the United States. Scenes showing Moore's visit to Norway and depicting its healthcare system, social benefits, and rehabilitation-based prison system were removed from the film because the Norwegian healthcare system, which is supervised by the Norwegian Board of Health Supervision, possesses numerous benefits similar to the French system. Like the French health care system, Norwegian patients treated for illnesses such as psoriasis or rheumatism are shown eligible for two weeks' paid vacation at a spa in the Canary Islands. Norway hires a government ethicist to determine how to invest the windfall from the country's oil wealth, because they want to do it in an ethical manner. A scene where Moore visits Bastøy Prison, a Norwegian island prison, was also deleted. Here, inmates reside in small group homes and focus on rehabilitation through manual labor and farming.

Deleted American health care scenes include an uninsured woman who was offered a 50% discount for treatment of spinal cancer. She still could not afford the initial consultations, so she held a fundraiser to pay for it. After the initial visit, the 50 percent discount was revoked when the hospital discovered that she had obtained the money to pay for her treatment through fundraising, which the hospital considered to be earned income. An interview with Marcia Angell was also deleted. The former editor of The New England Journal of Medicine criticizes various practices of pharmaceutical companies and the Food and Drug Administration. Executive producer Harvey Weinstein asked Moore to remove a scene critical of Hillary Clinton, but Moore refused. Weinstein, whose company provided financing for the film, is a friend of the Clinton family.

In the DVD edition of the film, Moore added a segment called "Sicko Goes to Washington". This extra promotes the United States National Health Care Act, legislation that would create a single-payer health care system within the United States.

== See also ==
- 2007 in film
- Comparison of the health care systems in Canada and the United States
- Health care reform in the United States
- List of healthcare reform advocacy groups in the United States
- National health insurance
- National Physicians Alliance
- Nordic model
