= Orsec-Novi plan =

French emergency plan for mass casualty incident

The Orsec-Novi plan (French: plan Orsec-Novi, French pronunciation: [plɑ̃ ɔʁ.sɛk no.vi]), or short Novi plan (French: plan Novi, French pronunciation: [plɑ̃ no.vi]), is a French emergency plan used for a mass casualty incident (mascal), i.e. if an emergency has a significant number of casualties in a limited area. Its aim is to organize the rescue resources to cope with the concentrated casualties. It was formerly called red plan (French: plan rouge, French pronunciation: [plɑ̃ ʁuʒ]); "Orsec" stands for "rescue management" (organisation des secours), and "novi" for "multiple casualties" (nombreuses victimes).

It is different from the French white plan (French: plan blanc), which is designed to face a sudden and unpredicted rise of the activity of a hospital. Since 2007, it is part from the Orsec plan (French: plan Orsec), which is generally designed to face insufficient emergency resources. In a Novi plan, the emergency resources are sufficient. The difficulty is coordinating them.

The white plan is often launched along with the Novi plan in order to face the massive arrival of casualties evacuated by the Novi plan.

The Novi plan is based on four concepts:

- The resources should be rationally organized: The resources should not hamper each other, or deplete resources needed by another emergency. This implies coordination of the different forces (firefighters, samu/emergency medical service, police), and assignment of roles (hierarchical sorting);
- There should be two chains of rescue, one focused on managing the site, the other focused on caring for the casualties;
- A field hospital (or advanced medical post) should be installed next to the casualties, to perform triage and stabilisation before the evacuation;
- There should be two commands, one on-site that deals with the management of the rescue operations, the other in a remote site (usually the préfecture) that deals with the reinforcement, the logistics...

== History ==
The "plan rouge" was created in 1978 by the fire brigade of Paris (Brigade des sapeurs-pompiers de Paris, BSPP), after explosions during an urban fire (rue Raynouard, Paris 16^{e}), that resulted in 13 dead and a great number of casualties. The name "red plan" refers to the traditional color of the French firefighters, and to the color of danger (blood/fire).

It was then extended to the whole French territory by 28 October 1986 the circulaire (ministerial instruction) #86-318 (ministry of Interior/French Home Office). The red plan is defined by each département and thus can slightly vary from a dépertement to the other, but all the red plans are very similar.

Following the 2004 Madrid train bombings and the 7 July 2005 London bombings, the French authorities considere the possibility of several simultaneous terrorist acts and create the "plan rouge alpha" (alpha red plan). It is implemented for the first time for the November 2015 Paris attacks.

Since 2007, the plan rouge is a specific case of the plan Orsec.

== Activation ==
The Novi plan is started in case of a disaster with limited consequences (accident catastrophique à effet limité, acel), when there are – or when there might be – numerous casualties. This plan is started by the préfet of the département (or, in case of Paris and its suburbs, by the préfet de police of Paris).

These situations are various:

- fire of great intensity with immediate risks for the population
- building collapse
- road accident, train accident, or airplane accident
- criminal act (collective aggression by firearm, explosives, hostage-taking, terrorist attack...)
- industrial injury
- natural disaster

The prerequisite for a Novi plan is a great number of casualties. This estimation can vary from département to département. In Paris, the following rules apply:

the situation involves a field hospital, and at least 15 persons must be evacuated to a hospital.
The notion of "number of casualties" is different depending on the situation, and is evaluated from the initial assessment (the Novi plan must be started quickly, i.e. before all the casualties are counted):
- for a fire, the number of casualties in the initial assessment is multiplied by 2: i.e. when the rescuers arrive, and count 6 to 8 casualties, there are usually about 15 casualties by the end of the operation;.
- for a terrorist bombing, the multiplication factor is 3, sometimes 4 or 5;
- for the other accidents, amongst which the public transport accident, the factor is 3 to 4.
In some specific situations, the risks (risk of explosion, of intoxication etc.), or the organizational constraints can lead to a Novi plan although there are only few casualties.

== General concept ==
In case of a Novi plan, it is necessary to simultaneously:

- fight the initial disaster and its direct and indirect consequences;
- extract the casualties from the hostile environment;
- care for the casualties.

Due to the complexity of these three missions, two command chains are formed, under the authority of the "commander of the rescue operations" (COS: commandant des opérations de secours) : the fire-and-rescue chain, and the medical chain:

- the fire-and-rescue chain has the charge to fight the initial disaster; the rescuers are entirely devoted to this task, and participate to the search and rescue, locating the casualties, extraction/extrication of the casualties and possibly perform first aid onsite;
- the medical chain has three functions:
  - the first aid onsite, casualty lifting (scoop) and movement from the disaster location to the field hospital (called "advanced medical post", or PMA: poste médical avancé);
  - triage and stabilising the casualties for the evacuation;
  - the evacuation of the casualties to adapted care structures (hospitals).

== Distribution of the responsibilities ==
Command structure during an Orsec-Novi plan (red plan).

The préfet of the département (or the préfet de police for Paris and its suburbs) is the director of rescue operations (DOS: directeur des opérations de secours). He starts the Novi plan; usually, the Novi plan is started by the firefighter or medical dispatch and then officialized by the préfet.

The chief officer of the local fire and rescue department (SDIS: service départemental d'incendie et de secours) is the "commander of the rescue operations" (COS: commandant des opérations de secours). He is assisted by the "director of fire and rescue" (DSIS: directeur des secours incendie et sauvetage), and by the "director of medical rescue" (DSM: directeur des secours médicaux). The DSM is usually the chief-physician of the firefighters or the director of samu (French EMS).

The main resources are the firefighters and Samu, but other organisations can contribute, such as the first aid associations (e.g. French Red Cross, volunteers of the civil protection/FNPC), who can contribute to the non-medical evacuations or deal with the relative emergencies, light wounded people and logistic for psychological aid (CUMP: cellule d'urgence médico-psychologique).

== The operational command ==
The commander of rescue operation (COS) coordinates the rescue resources on site (public, private or associations). He must be easily spotted and has thus a yellow chasuble-like jacket on his clothes, with the inscription "Commandant les Opérations de Secours". He has an operational headquarters (PCO: poste de commandement opérationnel) near the site of the disaster. The OHQ has communications with all the resources and administrations, including the police.

=== The director of fire and rescue (DSI) ===
The director of fire and rescue (DSI) is a firefighter officer. He manages:

- the fighting against the initial disaster;
- the search-and-rescue operations;
- in the beginning, the scoop operations, before the medical chain is fully operational (increasing the resources)

He has a yellow chasuble-like jacket with the inscription Directeur des Secours Incendie et Sauvetage.

=== The director of medical rescue (DSM) ===
The director of medical rescue (DSM) manages the medical chain described below.

He has a yellow chasuble-like jacket with the inscription Directeur des Secours Médicaux.

== The medical chain ==
Medical chain (casualty path) in an Orsed-Novi plan (mascal).

The medical chain is organized in three parts. The personal attributed to each part are identified by a colour armband: red-white-blue. These are the colours of the French flag, and are also the symbol of:

- red: danger zone;
- white: medical zone;
- blue: secured zone (away from the disaster site).

=== The scoop ===
The scoop follows of the extraction/extrication operations. It the responsibility of a firefighter officer. The casualties are transported by a stretcher chain (noria) to the advanced medical post (field hospital).

This officer has a red chasuble-like jacket with the inscription "Directeur des Secours Médicaux", and the personal have a red armband.

This part is also called "scoop noria" (French: noria de ramassage) or "small noria".

=== The advanced medical post (AMP) ===
The casualties are gathered at the advanced medical post (AMP, French: PMA, poste médical avancé), managed by a physician chosen by the director of medical rescue (DSM). He has to manage:

- the care to the casualties;
- the triage;
- to search for a destination (hospital) adapted to the different affections (medical regulation).

He commands:

- a firefighter officer (officier PMA) chosen by the commander of rescue operations (COS): he deals with the organization and logistics of the PMA
- first responders, paramedical (nurses, ambulance men) and medical staff
- a secretaryship made of firefighters, who deal with:
  - the establishment of the list of casualties;
  - filling the identification forms (FMA: fiches médicales de l'avant);
  - transmitting the list of casualties to the operational headquarters (PCO).

In urban environments, the advanced medical post (PMA) is often placed in a public location (bar, restaurant, hall of sports...). In wilderness or on a road away from any building, it is an inflatable structure.

The advanced medical post (PMA) is organized in three zones corresponding to the triage:

- Absolute emergency zone (French: UA: urgences absolues): prehospital resuscitation unit for very serious cases: extreme emergencies (French: EU: extrème urgence) and grave injuries (U1);
- Relative emergency zone (French: UR: urgences relatives): for the seriously (U2) and lightly injured (U3)
- Mortuary zone (French: dépot mortuaire) for the deceased casualties. This zone is under the responsibility of the judicial police.

Two additional zones can be created, besides the advanced medical (PMA) post but under the responsibility of the director of medical rescue (DSM):

- a gathering zone for non-injured people, managed by volunteer (non-professional, association) first aiders
- a zone for psychological support under the responsibility of physicians and psychiatrists, the MPEU (medical and psychological emergency unit, French: CUMP: cellule d'urgence médico-psychologique).

The chief physician of the advanced medical post has a white chasuble-like jacket with the inscription "Médecin PMA"; the firefighter officer has a white chasuble-like jacket with the inscription "PMA". The other staff members have a white armband.

=== The evacuation ===
The mission of the evacuation part is to gather and manage the patient evacuation resources, according to the needs expressed by the chief physician of the PMA. This area is managed by a firefighter officer. The evacuation resources can be firefighter rescue vehicles, private ambulance societies, vehicles from an association, helicopters, etc. The staff takes care that the instructions given by the chief physician are obeyed.

The officer of this zone has a blue chasuble-like jacket with the inscription "évacuation", and the staff members have a blue armband.

This part is also called "evacuation noria" (French: noria d'évacuation) or "great noria".

== See also ==
- Cabinet Office Briefing Rooms (UK)
- Incident Command System, Local Mitigation Strategies (USA)
