= Olatoye (name) =

- Language: Yoruba

Origin
- Origin: Nigeria
- Meaning: "Deserving of wealth, Worthy of riches or Wealth is worth honor/chieftaincy"
- Region of origin: South-west Nigeria

The name OlatoyeOlatoye.ogg is of Yoruba origin, a major ethnic group in West Africa, Nigeria. In the Yoruba language, the name can be broken down into two parts: "Ola" meaning (wealth or riches). While "Toye" meaning (To be worthy of or To be deserving of). Olatoye roughly translates to (Deserving of wealth, Worthy of riches or Wealth is worth honor/chieftaincy). The name conveys prosperity and worthiness.

== Notable people with the name ==
- Deji Olatoye (born 1991), American football cornerback
- Olatoye Temitope Sugar (1973 – 2019), Nigerian politician, Member of the Federal House of Representatives
- Oyesade Olatoye (born 25 January 1997), athlete born in the United States representing Nigeria
- Shola Olatoye (born 1975), American public servant
