= Tracy Pierce =

Tracy (Trae) Pierce may refer to:

- A member of The Blind Boys of Alabama
- A case study in the documentary SiCKO
