= ORSEC plan =

The ORSEC plan (French: plan ORSEC, French pronunciation: [plɑ̃ ɔʁ.sɛk]) is the French generic emergency plan in case of disaster, when the local means are not sufficient (catastrophe à moyens dépassés, CMD). "ORSEC" stands for Organisation de la Réponse de SÉcurité Civile, although most people say ORganisation des SECours, i.e. "rescue organization".

The ORSEC plan is for widespread or long-lasting natural disasters such as floods, severe storms, earthquakes or major industrial disaster (e.g. the explosion of the AZF factory in Toulouse); this does not necessarily mean many casualties, as there can be an ORSEC plan even when there are no wounded. The disasters with limited effects (small zone and short lasting) but with numerous casualties are handled by a red plan (plan rouge).

There is one ORSEC plan per département, started by the préfet, and one national ORSEC plan started by the prime minister.

Since 2007, the red plan is a specific case of the ORSEC plan.

== Description ==
The ORSEC plan is not a list of to-dos, but the description of a general organization:

- missions: who is in charge of what, of which danger.
- listing of the means: personnel, equipment, transmissions...
- how the means are mobilized: who must be called...

The structure is the following:

- one management staff (headquarter);
- if the disaster is localized: a double command (as for the red plan), one close to the disaster (operational command) and one distant (logistics, reinforcement);
- five operational services:
  - police and inquiries: maintenance of law and order, road traffic, requisition, identification of the victims;
  - search-and-rescue: firefighters, SAMU, volunteer first responders;
  - medical care and social aid: SAMU, hospitals;
  - transportation and work: civil engineering, buses...
  - contact and signals (transmission);
- one service in charge of public relations (press).

The launching of the ORSEC plan is also an administrative act that allows specific pay back.

== See also ==
- Orsan plan
- in case of emergency
- Other countries' disaster response plans:
  - United Kingdom: Gold Silver Bronze command structure
  - United States: National Response Plan, National Incident Management System, Federal Emergency Management Agency
