= Carte Vitale =

French health insurance card

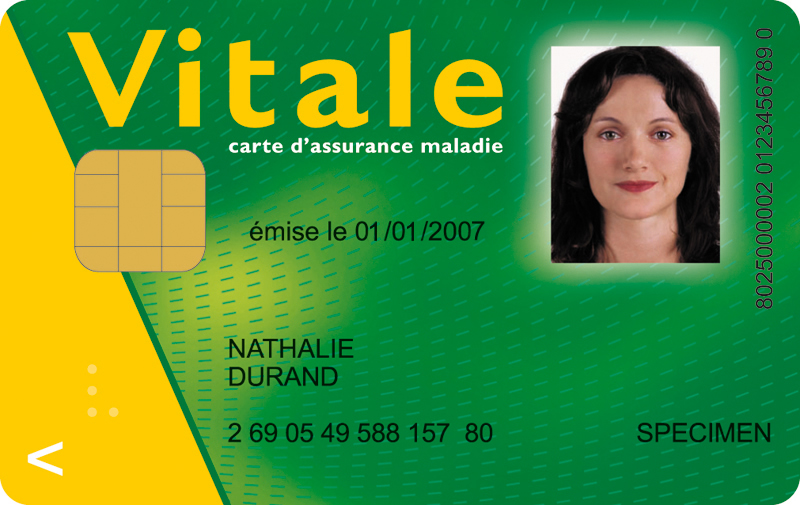
Carte Vitale 2

The Carte Vitale (French pronunciation: [kaʁt vital]; lit. 'Vital Card') is the health insurance card of the national health care system in France. It was introduced in 1998 to allow a direct settlement with the medical arm of the social insurance system. The declaration of a primary health insurance company (Caisse primaire d'assurance maladie) substitutes the card usage.

Since 2008, a second generation of smart cards is being introduced—the "Carte Vitale 2" carries a picture for identification and the smart card has additional functions of an electronic health insurance card to carry electronic documents of the treatment process. The first generation had been a family card carrying the names of all family members, thereby simply declaring they are covered by the French social security health care, while non-residents would need to use the European Health Insurance Card to prove their health insurance status.

== See also ==
- Electronic health record
- European health insurance card
- Italian health insurance card
