= Health care in France =

The French health care system is one of universal health care largely financed by government national health insurance. In 2017, France spent 11.3% of GDP on health care, or US$5,370 per capita, a figure higher than the average spent by rich countries (OECD average is 8.8%, 2017), though similar to Germany (10.6%) and Canada (10%), but much less than in the US (17.1%, 2018). Approximately 77% of health expenditures are covered by government-funded agencies.

Most general physicians are in private practice but draw their income from the public insurance funds. These funds, unlike their German counterparts, have never gained self-management responsibility. Instead, the government has taken responsibility for the financial and operational management of health insurance (by setting premium levels related to income and determining the prices of goods and services refunded). The French government generally refunds patients 70% of most health care costs, and 100% in case of costly or long-term ailments. Supplemental coverage may be bought from private insurers, most of them nonprofit, mutual insurers. Until 2000, coverage was restricted to those who contributed to social security (generally, workers or retirees), excluding some poor segments of the population. The government of Lionel Jospin put into place universal health coverage and extended the coverage to all those legally resident in France. Only about 3.7% of hospital treatment costs are reimbursed through private insurance, but a much higher share of the cost of spectacles and prostheses (21.9%), drugs (18.6%) and dental care (35.9%) (figures from the year 2000). There are public hospitals, non-profit independent hospitals (which are linked to the public system), as well as private for-profit hospitals.

== History ==
=== Public health initiatives (1871–1914) ===
The French Third Republic followed well behind Bismarckian Germany, as well as Great Britain, in developing the welfare state including public health. Tuberculosis was the most dreaded disease of the day, especially striking young people in their 20s. Germany set up vigorous measures of public hygiene and public sanatoria, but France let private physicians handle the problem, which left it with a much higher death rate. The French medical profession jealously guarded its prerogatives, and public health activists were not as well organized or as influential as in Germany, Britain or the United States. For example, there was a long battle over a public health law which began in the 1880s as a campaign to reorganize the nation's health services, to require the registration of infectious diseases, to mandate quarantines, and to improve the deficient health and housing legislation of 1850. However the reformers met opposition from bureaucrats, politicians, and physicians. Because it was so threatening to so many interests, the proposal was debated and postponed for 20 years before becoming law in 1902. Success finally came when the government realized that contagious diseases had a national security impact in weakening military recruits, and keeping the population growth rate well below Germany's.

=== Since 1945 ===
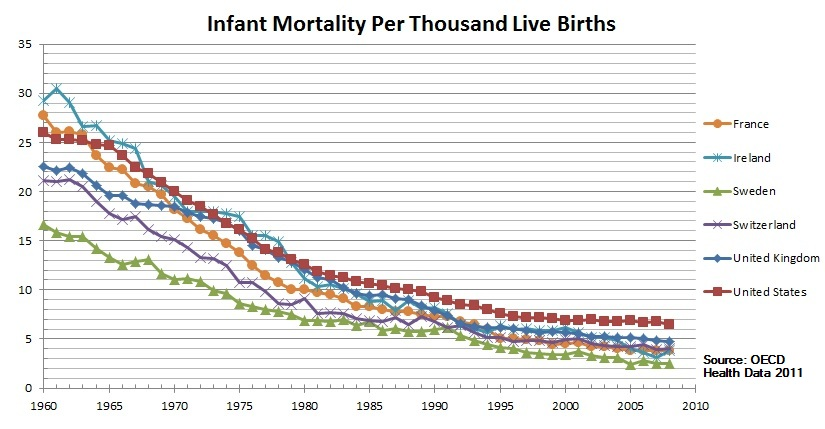
The reduction in infant mortality between 1960 and 2008 for France in comparison with Ireland, Switzerland, Sweden, the United Kingdom, and the United States.

The current system has undergone several changes since its foundation in 1945, though the basis of the system remains state planned and operated.

Jean de Kervasdoué, a health economist, believes that French medicine is of great quality and is "the only credible alternative to the Americanization of world medicine." According to Kervasdoué, France's surgeons, clinicians, psychiatrists, and its emergency care system (SAMU) are an example for the world. However, despite this, Kervasdoué criticizes the fact that hospitals must comply with 43 bodies of regulation and the nit-picking bureaucracy that can be found in the system. Kervasdoué believes that the state intervenes too much in regulating the daily functions of French hospitals.

Furthermore, Japan, Sweden, and the Netherlands have health care systems with comparable performance to that of France's, yet spend no more than 8% of their GDP (against France's spending of more than 10% of its GDP).

== Health care system ==
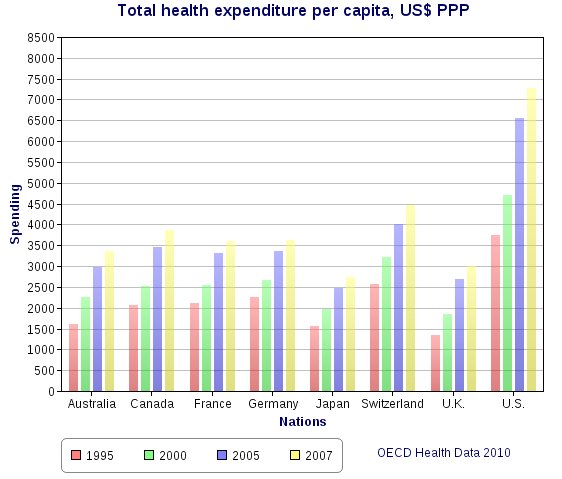
Total health spending per capita, in U.S. dollars PPP-adjusted, of France compared amongst various other first world nations.

The entire population must pay compulsory health insurance. The insurers are non-profit agencies that annually participate in negotiations with the state regarding the overall funding of health care in France. There are three main funds, the largest of which covers 84% of the population and the other two a further 12%. A premium is deducted from all employees' pay automatically. The 2001 Social Security Funding Act, set the rates for health insurance covering the statutory health care plan at 5.25% on earned income, capital and winnings from gambling and at 3.95% on benefits (pensions and allowances).

After paying the doctor's or dentist's fee, a proportion is reimbursed. This is usually 70%, but can be 100% (for certain long duration medical problems—such as a cancer, diabetes, cardiovascular disease). The balance is a co-payment paid by the patient but it can also be recovered if the patient subscribes to a complementary health insurance policy (more than 99% of the population as every worker is entitled, per law, to access to a company subsidized plan). Most of them are managed by not-for-profit groups called mutuelles.

Under recent rules (the coordinated consultation procedure, in French: "parcours de soins coordonné"), general practitioners ("médecin généraliste" or "docteur") are expected to act as "gate keepers" who refer patients to a specialist or a hospital when necessary. There is a free choice of the reference doctor, which is not restricted to only general practitioner and may still be a specialist or a doctor in a public or private hospital. The goal is to limit the number of consultations for the same illness. The incentive is financial in that expenses are reimbursed at much lower rates for patients who go directly to another doctor (except for dentists, ophthalmologists, gynaecologists and psychiatrists); vital emergencies are exempt from requiring the advice from the reference doctor, who will be informed later. Most health providers accept the "Carte Vitale", a smart card with information on the patient. When a patient pays a doctor or laboratory directly, the doctor/lab swipes the Carte Vitale to send the treatment and payment information to the Social Security system and the reimbursement usually arrives in the patient's bank account in five days. The information can also be forwarded by the provider to the complementary insurance company, which likewise reimburses its share. In pharmacies, the patient usually doesn't advance the payment; it is the pharmacy that is reimbursed by the national and complementary insurance. Most hospital payments are not seen by patients either. There is a problem in that most specialists and some in-hospital physicians do not respect the official fee structure. Patients pay the additional cost out of pocket, although some complementary policies will cover a limited excess charge.

Around 62% of hospital beds in France are provided by public hospitals, around 14% by private non-profit organizations, and 24% by for-profit companies.

Minister of Health and Solidarity is a cabinet position in the government of France. The healthcare portfolio oversees the public services and the health insurance part of Social Security. As ministerial departments are not fixed and depend on the Prime Minister's choice, the Minister sometimes has other portfolios among Work, Pensions, Family, the Elderly, Handicapped people and Women's Rights. In that case, they are assisted by junior Ministers who focus on specific parts of the portfolio.

The system is managed by the Caisse Nationale de l'Assurance Maladie.

=== Fees and reimbursements ===
The global system (social security system) will cover 70% of the global cost unless the person has an "ALD" (long duration medical problem) such as cancer or diabetes where all expenses are covered (100%). In the Alsace-Moselle region, due to its special history as having belonged to France and Germany at one time or another, the social security system covers 90% of the global cost. People must subscribe to a "mutuelle" (non-profit insurance) or a private for-profit insurance for additional cover. All workers have access to a specific plan where their company has to pay at least 50% of the cost.

Prices range from €10/month (full basic coverage; i.e., the balance of the official fees and medicines) to €100/month (luxury coverage including single room while in hospital, babysitters for children if they have to remain at home, housemaids at home if needed...).

In large cities, such as Paris, physicians (especially specialists) charge significantly more for consultations (i.e. 70–80 EUR as opposed to 25 EUR) because they are not adhering to the fees imposed by the Assurance Maladie, patients are reimbursed 70% of the official fee, with the mutuelle covering the rest up to 100% of the official fee. For instance, for an ophthalmologist in Paris, if the patient pays 80 EUR, he will be reimbursed 15.9 EUR by the Assurance Maladie and part of the remainder, up to a cap, by the mutuelle.

Act	Fee	% reimbursed	Patient charge before co-insurance	Patient charge in US dollar (2016) before co-insurance
Generalist consultation	€23	70%	€6.60	$7.30
Specialist consultation	€25	70%	€7.50	$8.20
Psychiatrist consultation	€37	70%	€11.10	$12.16
Cardiologist consultation	€49	70%	€14.17	$15.52
Filling a cavity	19.28–€48.20	70%	5.78–€14.46	$6.33–15.84
Root canal	€93.99	70%	€28.20	$30.89
Teeth cleaning	€28.92 *	70%	€8.68	$9.51
Prescription medicine	variable	15–100%, usually 65%	variable	variable
30 Ibuprofen 200 mg	€1.34	65%	€0.87	$0.96

- Dentists will get around this by scheduling or charging for two cleanings, upper and lower arch.

Patients are now charged a fee per package of medicine as a deductible. The fee varies according to the number of pills in the box (duration of treatment supply) and is not reimbursable by any insurance, but there is a maximum charge of €50 per year. There is also a recent fee for dispensing costs, which was accompanied by an offsetting decrease in the price of drugs. It is reimbursable by complementary insurance, as are new charges of about €0.50-€1.00 when prescriptions are for young children or the elderly, on the grounds the pharmacist must take time to give explanations for such patients.

In 2024, the French government proposed fining patients €5 for missing doctor appointments without a valid excuse, aiming to tackle the issue of 27 million annual no-shows. Despite intentions to improve healthcare, the plan faced criticism for potentially straining doctor-patient relations. Initiatives to address healthcare access in rural areas were also announced, including doubling medical school places by 2027. However, concerns remained over the projected deficit in the social security budget, expected to reach €11.2 billion.

=== Médecin généraliste, médecin traitant ===
The médecin généraliste is the responsible doctor for a patient long-term care. This implies prevention, education, care of diseases and traumas that do not require a specialist. They also follow severe diseases day-to-day (between acute crises that may require a specialist). Since 2006, every patient has to declare one generalist doctor as a "médecin traitant" (treating doctor) to the healthcare fund, who has to be consulted before being eventually referred to consult any specialist (gynecologists, psychiatrists, ophtamologists and dentists aside). This policy has been applied to unclog overconsultations of specialists for non-severe reasons.

They survey epidemics, fulfil a legal role (consultation of traumas that can bring compensation, certificates for the practice of a sport, death certificates, certificates for hospitalization without consent in case of mental incapacity), and a role in emergency care (they can be called by the SAMU, the emergency medical service). They often go to a patient's home if the patient cannot come to the consulting room (especially in case of children or old people) and they must also perform night and week-end duty.

=== Health insurance ===
Because the model of finance in the French health care system is based on a social insurance model, contributions to the program are based on income. Prior to reform of the system in 1998, contributions were 12.8% of gross earnings levied on the employer and 6.8% levied directly on the employee. The 1998 reforms extended the system so that the more wealthy with capital income (and not just those with income from employment) also had to contribute; since then the 6.8% figure has dropped to 0.75% of earned income. In its place a wider levy based on total income has been introduced, gambling taxes are now redirected towards health care and recipients of social benefits also must contribute. Because the insurance is compulsory, the system is effectively financed by general taxation rather than traditional insurance (as typified by auto or home insurance, where risk levels determine premiums).

The founders of the French social security system were largely inspired by the Beveridge Report in the United Kingdom and aimed to create a single system guaranteeing uniform rights for all. However, there was much opposition from certain socio-professional groups who already benefited from the previous insurance coverage that had more favourable terms. These people were allowed to keep their own systems. Today, 95% of the population is covered by 3 main schemes, one for commerce and industry workers and their families, another for agricultural workers, and lastly the national insurance fund for self-employed non-agricultural workers.

All working people are required to pay a portion of their income into a health insurance fund, which mutualizes the risk of illness and which reimburses medical expenses at varying rates. Children and spouses of insured individuals are eligible for benefits, as well. Each fund is free to manage its own budget and reimburse medical expenses at the rate it saw fit.

The government has two responsibilities in this system:

- The first is a government responsibility that fixes the rate at which medical expenses should be negotiated and it does this in two ways. The Ministry of Health directly negotiates prices of medicine with the manufacturers, based on the average price of sale observed in neighbouring countries. A board of doctors and experts decides if the medicine provides a valuable enough medical benefit to be reimbursed (note that most medicine is reimbursed, including homeopathy). In parallel, the government fixes the reimbursement rate for medical services. Doctors choose to be in Sector 1 and adhere to the negotiated fees, to Sector 2 and be allowed to charge higher fees within reason ("tact and mesure") or Sector 3 and have no fee limits (a very small percentage of physicians, and their patients have reduced reimbursements). The social security system will only reimburse at the pre-set rate. These tariffs are set annually through negotiation with doctors' representative organisations.
- The second government responsibility is oversight of health-insurance funds, to ensure that they are correctly managing the sums they receive, and to ensure oversight of the public hospital network.

Today, this system is more or less intact. All citizens and legal foreign residents of France are covered by one of these mandatory programs, which continue to be funded by worker participation. However, since 1945, a number of major changes have been introduced. Firstly, the different health care funds (there are five: General, Independent, Agricultural, Student, Public Servants) now all reimburse at the same rate. Secondly, since 2000, the government now provides health care to those who are not covered by a mandatory regime (those who have never worked and who are not students, meaning the very rich or the very poor). This regime, unlike the worker-financed ones, is financed via general taxation and reimburses at a higher rate than the profession-based system for those who cannot afford to make up the difference.

Finally, to counter the rise in health care costs, the government has installed two plans (in 2004 and 2006), which require most people to declare a referring doctor in order to be fully reimbursed for specialist visits, and which installed a mandatory co-payment of €1 (about US$1.35) for a doctor visit (limited to €50 annually), €0.50 (about US$0.77) for each prescribed medicine (also limited to €50 annually) and a fee of €16–18 ($20–25) per day for hospital stays (considered to be the "hotel" part of the hospital stay; that is, an amount people would pay anyway for food, etc.) and for expensive procedures. Such declaration is not required for children below 16 years old (because they already benefit from another protection program), for foreigners without residence in France (who will get benefits depending on existing international agreements between their own national health care program and the French Social Security), or those benefiting from a health care system of French overseas territories, and for those people that benefit from the minimum medical assistance.

An important element of the French insurance system is solidarity: the more ill a person becomes, the less they pay. This means that for people with serious or chronic illnesses (with vital risks, such as cancers, AIDS, or severe mental illness, where the person becomes very dependent of his medical assistance and protection) the insurance system reimburses them 100% of expenses and waives their co-payment charges.

Finally, for fees that the mandatory system does not cover, there is a large range of private complementary insurance plans available. The market for these programs is very competitive. Such insurance is often subsidised by the employer, which means that premiums are usually modest. 85% of French people benefit from complementary private health insurance.

=== Quality ===
A government body, ANAES, Agence Nationale d'Accréditation et d'Evaluation en Santé (The National Agency for Accreditation and Health Care Evaluation) was responsible for issuing recommendations and practice guidelines. There are recommendations on clinical practice (RPC), relating to the diagnosis, treatment and supervision of certain conditions, and in some cases, to the evaluation of reimbursement arrangements. ANAES also published practice guidelines which are recommendations on good practice that doctors are required to follow according to the terms of agreements signed between their professional representatives and the health insurance funds. There are also recommendations regarding drug prescriptions, and to a lesser extent, the prescription or provision of medical examination. By law, doctors must maintain their professional knowledge with ongoing professional education. ANAES was combined with other commissions in the High Authority of Health on 13 August 2004.

== Emergency medicine ==
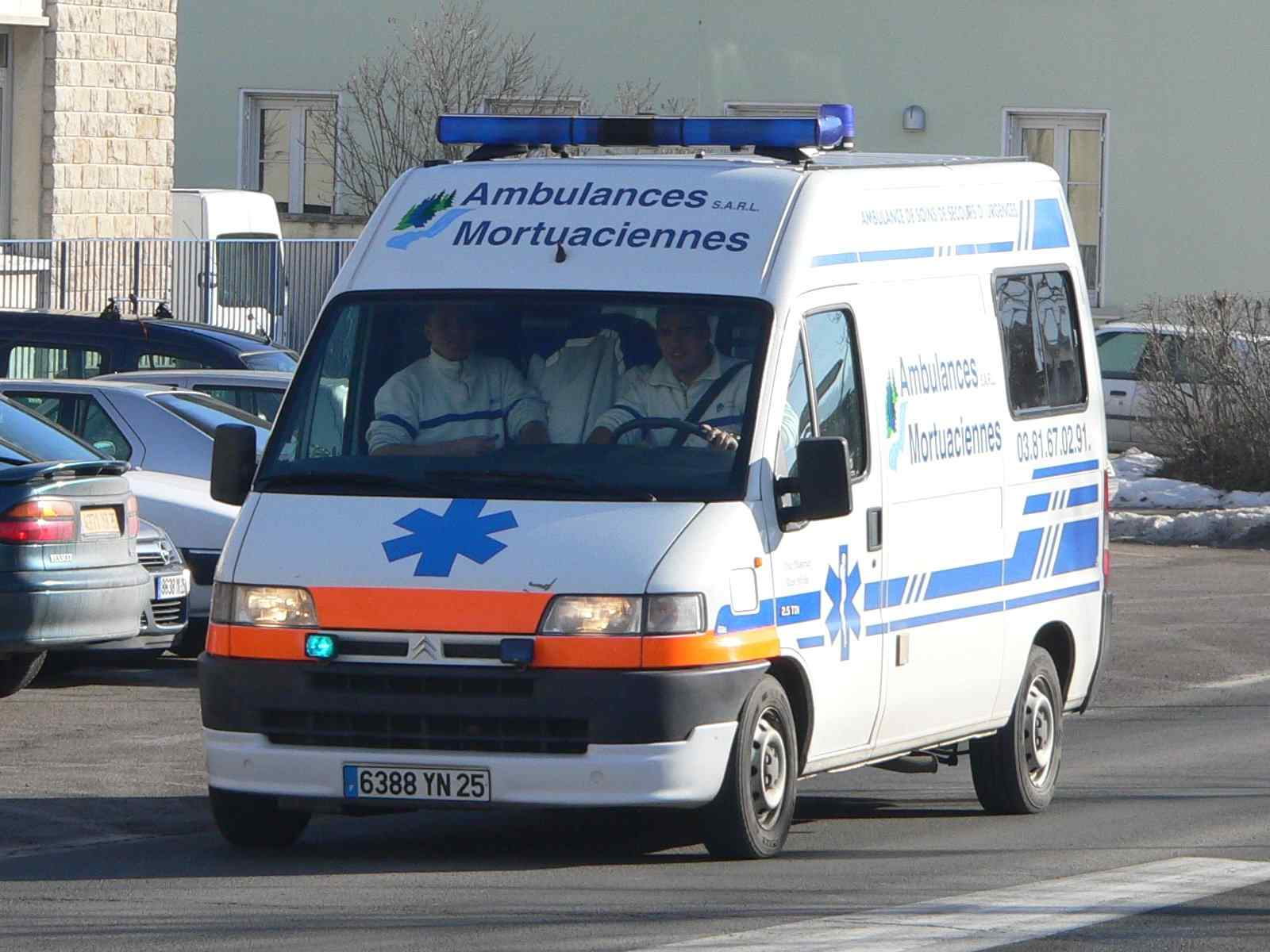
Private Ambulance in Pontarlier

Ambulatory care includes care by general practitioners who are largely self-employed and mostly work alone, although about a third of all GPs work in a group practice. GPs do not exercise gatekeeper functions in the French medical system and people can see any registered medical practitioner of choice including specialists. Thus ambulatory care can take place in many settings.

== Spending ==
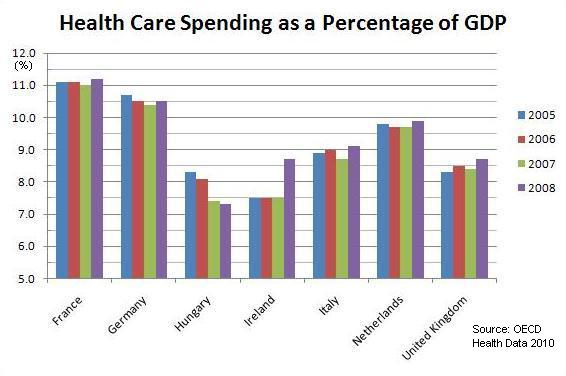
Total health spending as a percentage of GDP for France compared amongst various other first world nations from 2005 to 2008

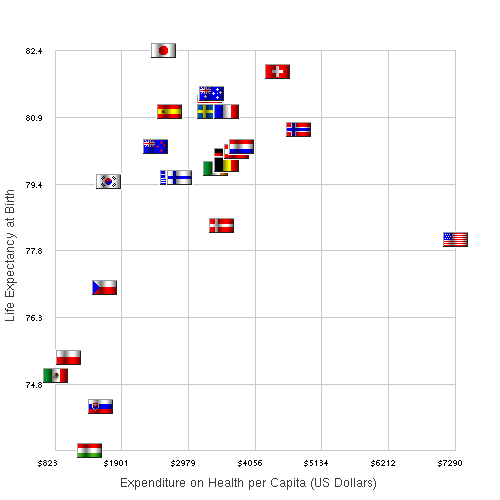
Healthcare spending vs life expectancy for some countries in 2007

The French healthcare system was named by the World Health Organization in 2008 as the best performing system in the world in terms of availability and organization of health care providers . It is a universal health care system. It features a mix of public and private services, relatively high expenditure, high patient success rates and low mortality rates, and high consumer satisfaction. Its aims are to combine low cost with flexibility of patient choice as well as doctors' autonomy. While 99.9% of the French population is covered, the rising cost of the system has been a source of concern, as has the lack of emergency service in some areas. In 2004, the system underwent a number of reforms, including introduction of the Carte Vitale smart card system, improved treatment of patients with rare diseases, and efforts aimed at reducing medical fraud. While private medical care exists in France, the 75% of doctors who are in the national program provide care free to the patient, with costs being reimbursed from government funds. Like most countries, France faces problems of rising costs of prescription medication, increasing unemployment, and a large aging population.

Expenses related to the healthcare system in France represented 10.5% of the country's GDP and 15.4% of its public expenditures. In 2004, 78.4% of these expenses were paid for by the state. By 2015 the cost had risen to 11.5% of GDP – the third highest in Europe.

In a sample of 13 developed countries France was first in its population weighted usage of medication in 14 classes in both 2009 and 2013. The drugs studied were selected on the basis that the conditions treated had high incidence, prevalence and/or mortality, caused significant long-term morbidity and incurred high levels of expenditure and significant developments in prevention or treatment had been made in the last 10 years. The study noted considerable difficulties in cross border comparison of medication use.

== Hospitals ==
As of 2004, about 62 percent of French hospital capacity is met by publicly owned and managed hospitals. The remaining capacity is split evenly (18% each) between non-profit sector hospitals (which are linked to the public sector and which tend to be owned by foundations, religious organizations or mutual-insurance associations) and by for-profit institutions.

== Doctors ==
While French doctors only earn about 60% of what American doctors make, their expenses are reduced because they pay no tuition for medical school (cost for a year range from €200 to 500 but students get paid during their internships in hospitals) and malpractice insurance is less costly compared with the United States (as all doctors subscribe to the same fund). Low medical malpractice insurance may also be the byproduct of past litigations often favoring the medical practitioners. This started to change due to the implementation of the Patients' Rights Law of 2002. The French National Insurance system also pays for a part of social security taxes owed by doctors that agree to charge the government-approved fees. The number of French doctors has recently declined. Reasons for this may be because they prefer to specialize and get jobs at hospitals rather than setting up General Practices. The workload for general practice doctors requires more hours and responsibility than workplace and supply doctors.

== Waiting times and access ==
Siciliani and Hurst did a major comparison of countries reporting long waits for health care and countries that did not. In a comparison of health care funding, institutions and level of resources between countries, prevention of long waiting lists in France was attributed to a high number of doctors and hospital beds, combined with fee-for-service funding of doctors and private hospitals.

In France, many specialists treat patients outside hospitals; these ambulatory specialists are paid fee-for-service. Private hospitals were also paid by diem daily rates and fee-for-service in 2003, and provided much of total surgery. Fee-for-service rather than limited budgets, with access for patients with public health insurance helped prevent long waits for surgery (Siciliani and Hurst, 2003, pp. 69–70). Now, public, private nonprofit hospitals and for-profit hospitals are all paid by a DRG system.

However, assertions that France does not have waiting lists at all are not true. Long waits apparently remain unusual. However, some moderate waits have developed. French patients were relatively unlikely to report forgoing care because of waits (Eurostat, 2012). However, there are wait times for some procedures such as MRI scans, perhaps relating to low numbers of scanners, and in certain areas for certain specialties like ophthalmology, partly relating to unequal distributions of doctors (Chevreul et al., 2015, p. 182).

The Commonwealth Fund 2010 Health Policy Survey in 11 Countries reported found that a relatively high percentage of French patients reported waiting more than four weeks to see their most recent specialist appointment in France (higher than New Zealand, the U.K and Australia). This percentage held relatively constant over time, showing that waiting lists in France for appointments and elective surgery are not a new phenomenon. Fifty three percent of specialist appointments took less than 1 month (relatively low), and 28% more than two months. However, while moderate waits for elective surgery were common (only 46% said they had waited less than one month) the percentage reporting four-month-plus waits was only 7%, low and similar to the U.S., Switzerland, and the Netherlands. So, it appears that extremely long waits (like those in the U.K.'s NHS in the 1990s) are still rare.

This study has limitations. The number of people surveyed may not have been perfectly representative, although the figures held similar over time. The study also did not state the percentage of total appointments taking this long (whether a patient's appointments after the initial appointment were more timely or not), although the most recent appointment would presumably reflect both initial and subsequent appointments), or the total number of appointments available. The waits were self-reported, rather than collected from statistics; this may also lead the data to be not completely representative.

In terms of health care supply, France has far more doctors per capita than the U.K., Australia, New Zealand, and the U.S. This suggests that while French patients in some cases have similar to current waiting times to the first 3 countries, the number of patients who receive appointments and treatment is significantly higher than in the U.K., Australia and New Zealand (whose global budgets for hospitals also likely capped the supply at lower levels). It is also relevant that while American, Swiss and German patients generally reported short waits, a significant minority of American patients reported waiting longer than 4 weeks for a specialist appointment (about 20%), and longer than 1 month for elective surgery (30%).

== See also ==
- Emergency medicine in France – SAMU (Service d'Aide Médicale Urgente)
- Field hospitals (France)
- French hospitals
- French white plan
- Health care compared – tabular comparisons with the US, Canada, and other countries not shown above.
- List of hospitals in France
- Minister of Health (France)
- Social security in France
- State medical aid
- French National Public Health Agency
