= Local Mitigation Strategy =

Local government plan

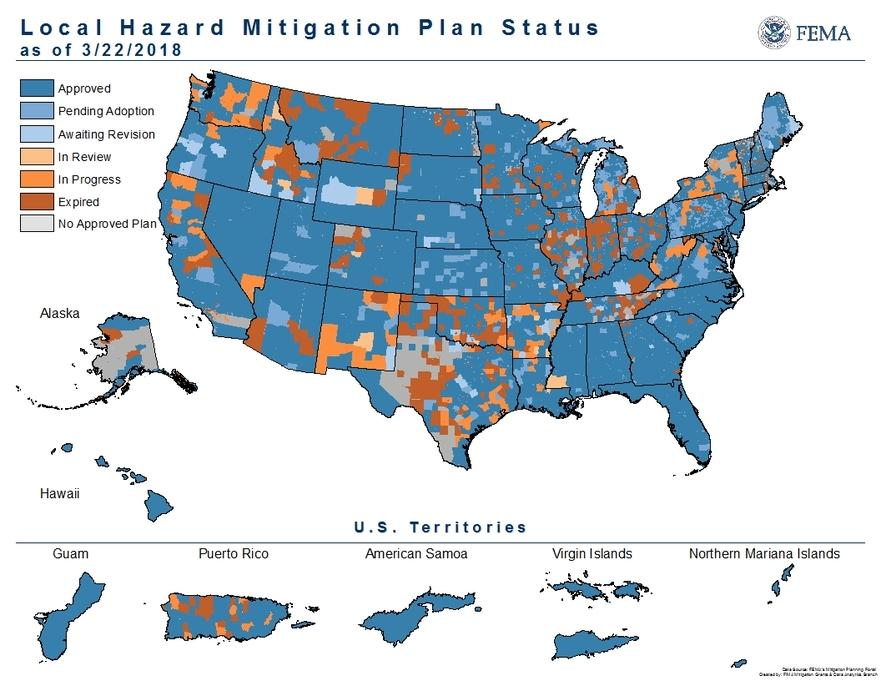
Status of Local Hazard Mitigation Plans from FEMA as of March, 2018

A Local Mitigation Strategy (LMS) or Local Hazard Mitigation Plan (HMP) is a local government plan (in the United States, typically implemented at a county level), that is designed to reduce or eliminate risks to people and property from natural and man-made hazards. Mitigation strategies are supported by state government and federal programs, in line with the Disaster Mitigation Act.

The need for hazard mitigation has become more widely recognized over the past few years, due to the large number of natural hazards that have occurred in the U.S. and the increase in the costs to achieve post-disaster recovery. Money spent prior to a hazardous event to reduce the impacts of a disaster can result in substantial savings in life and property following the event. The benefits of implementing a hazard mitigation program usually far outweigh the costs. As a result, the Federal Emergency Management Agency (FEMA) and the states have developed national and state Mitigation Strategies and funding is becoming increasingly more available to support hazard mitigation efforts.

The advantages of developing a LMS include access to government funds for hazard mitigation projects, the provision of protective information to local officials, residents, and businesses, and the protection of an area's population, property, infrastructure, economy, environment, and quality of life.

The hazard mitigation initiatives that a community develops must have their basis in the community's guiding principles on hazard mitigation, and should also be grounded in an empirical, geographic, and historical analysis of the jurisdiction's hazards. The initiatives must actively reduce a community's vulnerability to hazards in order to be considered mitigation activities, rather than emergency preparedness activities. Actions and their implementation expenses can be justified through the vulnerability assessment section of the strategy, which documents the types of damages and other impacts that hazards have had, or could cause in the future, within the planning area. Finally, mitigation initiatives must accurately reflect the community's needs—what is politically, legally, economically, and technically feasible and sufficiently equitable in socioeconomic terms. The working group assigned to develop the strategy can help assure that local needs are incorporated in the mitigation initiatives. These steps should lead to projects that are grounded in a community's overall vision of hazard mitigation, planning, regulations, resources, and goals, and that can lead to a tangible reduction in its vulnerability to hazards, based upon the findings of its hazard analysis section.

== See also ==
- Disaster mitigation – Reduction of something harmful or the reduction of its harmful effects
- Orsec-Novi plan – French emergency plan for mass casualty incident (France)
