= Wagner Graduate School of Public Service =

Public policy school of New York University

Coordinates: 40.72472°N 73.99550°W

Robert F. Wagner Graduate School of Public Service
- Type: Private
- Established: 1938
- Parent institution: New York University
- Academic affiliations: TPC
- Dean: Polly Trottenberg
- Postgraduates: 800+
- Location: New York City, New York, United States
- Website: wagner.nyu.edu

The Robert F. Wagner Graduate School of Public Service is the public policy school of New York University in New York City, United States. The school was named after New York City former mayor Robert F. Wagner Jr. in 1989.

== History ==
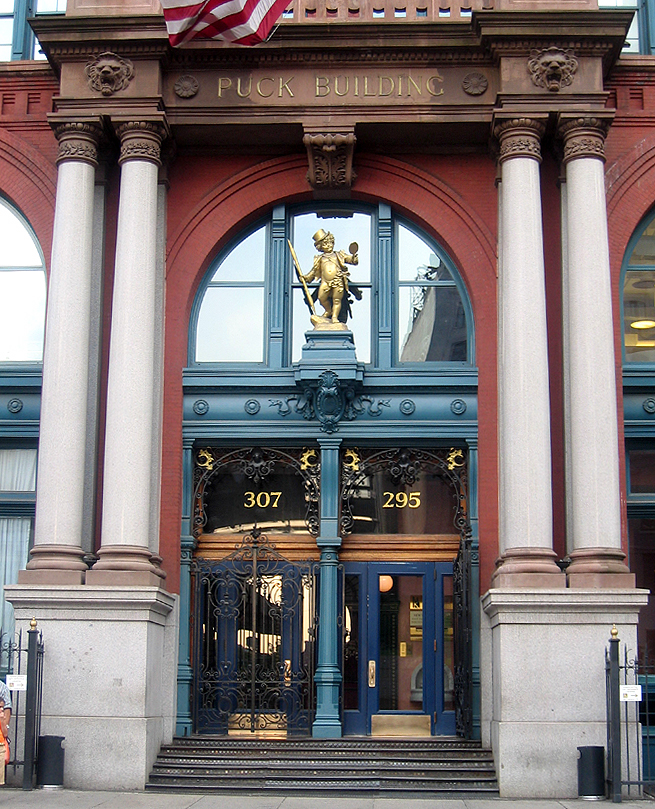
The Puck Building, former home of NYU Wagner

In 1938, NYU offered its first Master of Public Administration (MPA) degree in response to overfilled public service-oriented classes at the university. Fifteen years later, NYU established a stand-alone school—the School for Public Service and Social Work. At around the same time, Robert Ferdinand Wagner Jr., as Mayor of New York City, worked to build public housing and schools, and established the right for city employees to collectively bargain. Wagner also made housing discrimination based on race, creed, or color illegal in New York City. In 1989, NYU renamed the school the Robert F. Wagner Graduate School of Public Service in honor of the three-term mayor after receiving a major donation from Marshall Manley, Ray Chambers, and Walter Annenberg.

In 2004, NYU Wagner relocated to the Puck Building, a New York City landmark in the city's SoHo neighborhood. In 2024, NYU Wagner permanently relocated to 105 E. 17th Street. Classes have been held in the building since January 2025.

== Academics ==
The school offers the following degrees:

- Master of Public Administration (MPA) in public and nonprofit management and policy
- Master of Public Administration in health policy and management
- Master of Healthcare Administration (MHA)
- Master of Urban Planning (MUP)
- Master of Science in Public Policy (MSPP)
- Master of Science in Health Law Strategy (MSHLS)
- Executive Master of Public Administration (EMPA)
- Doctor of Philosophy (PhD) in public administration

NYU Wagner also offers joint degree programs with the NYU School of Law, NYU Stern School of Business, NYU School of Medicine, the Skirball Department of Hebrew and Judaic Studies, the NYU College of Arts and Science, and the NYU College of Global Public Health.

The school operates several research centers, institutes, and initiatives.

=== Programs ===
In addition to offerings in the NYU Wagner course listings, students are eligible to cross-register for many courses at the other graduate and professional schools at NYU.

NYU Wagner offers the following Undergraduate Minors in partnership with several New York University schools:

- Social Entrepreneurship
- Public Policy and Management
- Social and Public Policy
- Multifaith and Spiritual Leadership

Combined Bachelor's and master's degree programs at NYU Wagner allow students to complete undergraduate and graduate degrees in five years instead of the traditional six. Combined dual-degree BA-MPA programs include:

- BA-MPA with NYU Abu Dhabi
- BA-MPA with NYU College of Arts and Science
- BA-MPA with NYU Gallatin School of Individualized Study
- BA-MPA with NYU Global Liberal Studies

The BA-MUP with the College of Arts and Science allows New York University undergraduates majoring in Economics, International Relations, Metropolitan Studies, Politics, Sociology, or Urban Design and Architecture who have completed most of their undergraduate degrees to take graduate courses and receive the Master's in Urban Planning.

The BA-MUP with the NYU Tandon School of Engineering allows New York University Tandon undergraduates majoring in Sustainable Urban Environments, Construction Management, or Civil Engineering who have earned a GPA of 3.0 or higher to take graduate courses and receive the Master's in Urban Planning.

=== Capstone project ===
All MPA and MUP students are required to complete a team-based Capstone project where they turn their classroom learning into practice to help nonprofit, public, and private sector organizations tackle a critical challenge.

=== Research centers & institutes ===
- Financial Access Initiative: FAI is a research center exploring financial inclusion, development, and poverty.
- The Center on International Cooperation: CIC is an NYU research center and think tank aimed at strengthen collaboration between national governments, international organizations, and policymakers.
- The Furman Center for Real Estate & Urban Policy: In partnership with the NYU School of Law, The Furman Center studies and debates housing, the real estate industry, land use, and urban affairs.
- Health Evaluation and Analytics Lab: In partnership with the Department of Population Health at NYU Grossman School of Medicine, HEAL studies New York State's influence on national Medicaid policy and healthcare delivery reform.
- The Rudin Center for Transportation Policy & Management: Through faculty and graduate student research, The Rudin Center examines challenges in transportation and infrastructure.

== Notable people ==
=== Former faculty ===
Following are some of the school's former and current notable faculty.

- Alan Altshuler, Massachusetts Secretary of Transportation (1972–1975), former dean
- Doug Band, founding partner and president of Teneo (2011–2020), former adjunct professor
- Tom Coleman, Missouri Congressman (1976–1993)
- Dalton Conley, sociologist and Guggenheim Fellow (2011), dean at University of the People, former affiliate professor
- Bill de Blasio, former New York City Mayor, former Marnold Visiting Fellow
- Harold Ford Jr., member of the U.S. House of Representatives from Tennessee's 9th district (1997–2007), former adjunct professor
- Gara LaMarche, president of the Democracy Alliance (2013– ), former adjunct professor
- Jacob Lew, 76th United States Secretary of the Treasury (2013–2017), former adjunct professor
- Timothy Naftali, historian and former director of the Tamiment Library and Robert F. Wagner Archives at New York University (2014–2015) and the Richard Nixon Presidential Library and Museum (2007–2011), former clinical professor
- Victor G. Rodwin, co-director of the World Cities Project, professor emeritus
- Robert Shrum, political consultant for Al Gore and John Kerry (1986–2004), former senior fellow

=== Current faculty ===
- Jorge Castañeda, Mexican Secretary of Foreign Affairs (2000–2003), affiliated faculty
- Sherry Glied, professor of public service, and former dean
- Eric Klinenberg, public sociologist and scholar of urban studies, culture, and media
- Jonathan Morduch, development economist and executive director of the Financial Access Initiative (2006– )

=== Alumni ===
For a comprehensive list of NYU Wagner and New York University alumni, please refer to the List of New York University People.

- Chelsea Clinton, Vice Chair of the Clinton Foundation (2011– ), daughter of U.S. President Bill Clinton and U.S. Secretary of State Hillary Clinton
- Lorraine Cortés-Vázquez, former Secretary of State of New York
- Jennifer Jones Austin, CEO of Federation of Protestant Welfare Agencies (2006– )
- Shola Olatoye, CEO of the New York City Housing Authority (2014–2018)
- Derek Bryson Park, Director of the Federal Home Loan Bank of New York (1999–2002), Commissioner of the New York City Commission on Human Rights (2000–2014)
- Chris Shays, Connecticut Congressman (1987–2009)
- Jeremy Travis, President of John Jay College of Criminal Justice (2004–2016)
- Iris Weinshall, COO of The New York Public Library (2014 – )
- John White, Superintendent of the Louisiana Department of Education (2012–2020)
