= National Fund for Health Insurance =

The National Fund for Health Insurance (Caisse nationale de l’assurance maladie (in French)) is the French National health insurance fund. Until 1 January 2018 it was called the National Health Insurance Fund.

It was created by the 1967 ordinance which established a separation of Social Security into autonomous branches: sickness (CNAM), family (CNAF) and old age (CNAV). It acts under the supervision of the Ministry of Social Security and the Ministry of Economy and Finance.

It is involved in the scheme for therapeutic part-time work, established by the law of 10 August 2018 which is intended to help disabled employees return to employment. If the Social Security Medical Board considers this appropriate payment of sickness benefits will continue.

In 2022 most of the 4,200 medical analysis laboratories it funded went on strike against proposals to permanently reduce their fees.
