= Shola Olatoye =

American public servant (born 1975)

Oyeshola "Shola" Olatoye (o-LAH-twoh-yay) (born 1975) is an American public servant who served as the 22nd Chair and Chief Executive Officer of the New York City Housing Authority (NYCHA) before resigning due to a lead-paint poisoning and lack-of-heat scandals.

== Early life and education ==
Oyeshola Olatoye grew up Waterbury, Connecticut. Her father is Nigerian. After her parents' divorce, Olatoye lived with her mother in one of the first integrated rental housing developments in the city, later using the down payment assistance program to purchase her first home. Her mother was highly involved with their community and was someone who people turned to when they needed help.

Olatoye graduated with a Bachelors of Arts in history and African American studies from Wesleyan University in 1996 and later earned a master's degree in public administration from the Robert F. Wagner Graduate School of Public Service at New York University (NYU).

== Career ==
In 2001, Olatoye worked for Public Advocate Mark Green's 2001 mayoral bid as the issues director.

In 2009, she joined Enterprise Community Partners where she became the vice president and market leader for the New York office prior to being named chair and CEO of NYCHA. At Enterprise, she led a team of roughly 50 employees to build and preserve 3,000 units of affordable housing in the New York area. She also helped secure over $30 million in federal recovery dollars for 11,000 residents impacted by Hurricane Sandy.

=== New York City Housing Authority ===
In 2014, Olatoye was appointed by Mayor Bill de Blasio as the chair and Chief Executive Officer of the New York City Housing Authority (NYCHA). As chair and CEO she developed a 10-year turnaround plan called NextGeneration NYCHA (NextGen) and balanced the $3.1 billion operating budget for four years through help from the federal government upping its aid to the agency, hiking rents, removing community and senior centers from its property list, and not being charged for police services. During her tenure, she announced the plan to lease public housing land to private developers to build roughly 500 apartments for low-income tenants. She also reduced central office costs by $23 million and negotiated a deal with union leaders to complete maintenance repairs faster.

Failure to inspect NYCHA properties of lead paint had begun during the Bloomberg administration in 2012, but Olatoye signed off on paperwork stating the agency's compliance of inspection and neither she nor top officials alerted the public or tenants until after they had remediated apartments. In 2015, NYCHA officials and the Department of Investigation (DOI) knew they were not in compliance with city law to inspect apartments for lead paint but denied any wrongdoing to federal prosecutors. Later that year, the office of the United States attorney for the Southern District of New York requested the agency to send documentation relating to lead paint. On March 28, 2016, Olatoye testified before the City Council that the agency was in compliance. Her testimony was quickly cited as false. The de Blasio administration denied any wrongdoing on the part of Olatoye or NYCHA. In April 2018, she resigned from her position, stating she never intended to retain the position in a second mayoral term and joined building contractor Suffolk as vice president in charge of business development in New York.

=== Oakland Department of Housing & Community Services ===
In 2020, Olatoye was appointed by Mayor Libby Schaaf as the Director of the Department of Housing & Community Services for Oakland, California. Her goals in the position were to lay out a capital plan, gather data to direct those goals and offer transparency, hiring, and work towards racial equity. These goals were challenged by the COVID-19 pandemic where she helped secure state COVID-19 funds for new housing sites and oversaw the city’s rental assistance program. Under her leadership, the city removed barriers for residents at risk of losing their homes and needing quick access to $32 million in relief funds, ultimately serving roughly 3,000 households. Olatoye also created partnerships with the University of Pennsylvania and Stanford to gather necessary data for residents to understand where money was being spent.

In October 2022, Olatoye became the chief operating officer of Eden Housing, a non-profit developer in Oakland.

== Awards ==
In 2014, she was listed on Crain's list of "40 under 40" of New York's "most talented, driven, and dynamic" young professionals.

In 2017, she received the Elizabeth B. Wells Memorial Award by the National Association of Housing and Redevelopment Officials (NAHRO), the Coalition for Queens public service award, Wesleyan University Distinguished Alumni Award, Urban Upbound, and Green City Force.
