= Orsan plan =

The Orsan plan (French: plan Orsan, French pronunciation: [plɑ̃ ɔʁ.san]) is the emergency plan in France to face a sudden increase of activity in a hospital, such as a massive arrival of casualties due to an accident or a disaster (who may come by their own means to the emergency department or are evacuated by an Orsec-Novi plan), an epidemic or a lasting climatic event that becomes deadly for fragile people such as a heatwave.

It was created in 2014. "Orsan" stands for French: organisation de la réponse du système de santé en situations sanitaires exceptionnelles, i.e. "organisation of the healthcare response system in exceptional public health situations".

It is a nationwide emergency plan that is the frame for the white plans (French: plans blancs, French pronunciation: [plɑ̃ blɑ̃]) that are locally developed for hospitals.

== Sections ==
The Orsan plan has five sections:

- ORSAN AMAVI: massive number of non-contaminated casualties (French: accueil massif de victimes non-contaminées);
- ORSAN CLIM: massive number of patients due to a climate event e.g. heat wave or cold wave (French: prise en charge de nombreux patients suite à un phénomène climatique);
- ORSAN EPI-VAC: nationwide epidemic, with eventually vaccination campaign (French: gestion d'une épidémie ou d'une pandémie sur le territoire national, pouvant comprendre l'organisation d'une campagne de vaccination exceptionnelle par le système de santé);
- ORSAN BIO: known or emerging biological risk (French: prise en charge d'un risque biologique connu ou émergent);
- ORSAN NRC: nuclear, radiological or chemical event (French: prise en charge d'un risque nucléaire, radiologique ou chimique).

The Orsan plan was activated for the first time for the seasonal influenza epidemic during winter 2014–2015 and a second time during the November 2015 Paris attacks. See: References

== White Plans ==
The French disaster white plans are the new trend for the SAMU national network and integrated EMS (IEMS) towards a modern medical sanitary civil defence. These sanitary disaster plans are mandatory and implemented by each public health agency, public or private, by a person chosen by the institution. The plan is submitted to the consultative and deliberative authorities of the institution (board of directors, medical committee, technical committee, hygiene, security and working conditions committee) and by regional public health authorities.

The scheme of the white plans for the département is made by the director of public health (directeur départemental des affaires sanitaires et sociales), with the technical collaboration of the SAMU (French emergency medical service) and the regional public health authority. public health white plans are integrated with comprehensive disaster plans (Orsec plan).

It is initiated by the medical regulator doctor decision of the SAMU who alerts public health authority for extension. SAMU sends on the first line of the site a SAMU command post and an advanced medical post for prehospital medical triaging. The SAMU implements a specific extension of its daily medical regulation task. Neighbouring SAMU and even national SAMU network and the Public Health Ministry are connected with the local organisation and bring assistance to the local organisation.

White plans can be initiated in a local prehospital, hospital site or air evacuation site or at regional or higher levels.

The actions performed by the white plans include:

- a crisis management cell at each level (French: cellule de crise) is set up
- the care professional teams are maintained on duty (especially when the crisis happens at the shift change)
- the off-duty personnel are gradually called back, in order to have sufficient means, but keeping a reserve to take over if the crisis lasts;
- the transfer of patients from the strongly involved services to less involved services, and possibly to other less involved health institutions or even to home under SAMU regulation aid.
- the non-emergency operations are cancelled from the schedule;
- the available means are listed by the medical-technical services (pharmacy, laboratories, medical imaging) and the logistics services (laundry, catering);
- the switchboard is strengthened, the communications are exclusively reserved for the white plan;
- if necessary, the hospital is strengthened by a mobile sanitary kit (poste sanitaire mobile, PSM);
- in case of massive arrival at the emergency department, a strict triage is organised at the entrance of the hospital under the charge of a sorting physician; it is performed in a big room that is different from the usual emergency entrance and from the reception for the relatives and the press;
- a reception for the relatives and for the press is organised; the priests of the different religions are requested to help the relatives (morale);
- the traffic on the site is organised, to allow emergency transfers and efficient use of evacuation convoys. (Known in French as norias de ramassage);
- additional signs and boards are placed to allow an easy foot traffic inside the building; the watch and security are increased;
- when necessary, volunteers from voluntary associations can be requested (first aid or social aid associations), to deal with the small cares and support actions.

In case of a contaminating event (nuclear, radiological, biological or chemical – NBC), the flow of incoming patients must be strictly controlled to avoid the contamination of the rest of the institution.

Terrorist acts are most likely to happen at the end of the afternoon, to benefit from the mass media coverage of the evening news (at 8 pm, "le 20h"). In this case, keeping the day shift allows to have two shifts at the same time when the evening shift arrives.

== See also ==
- Orsec plan
- Orsec-Novi plan
