= SOS Médecins =

Emergency medical service in France

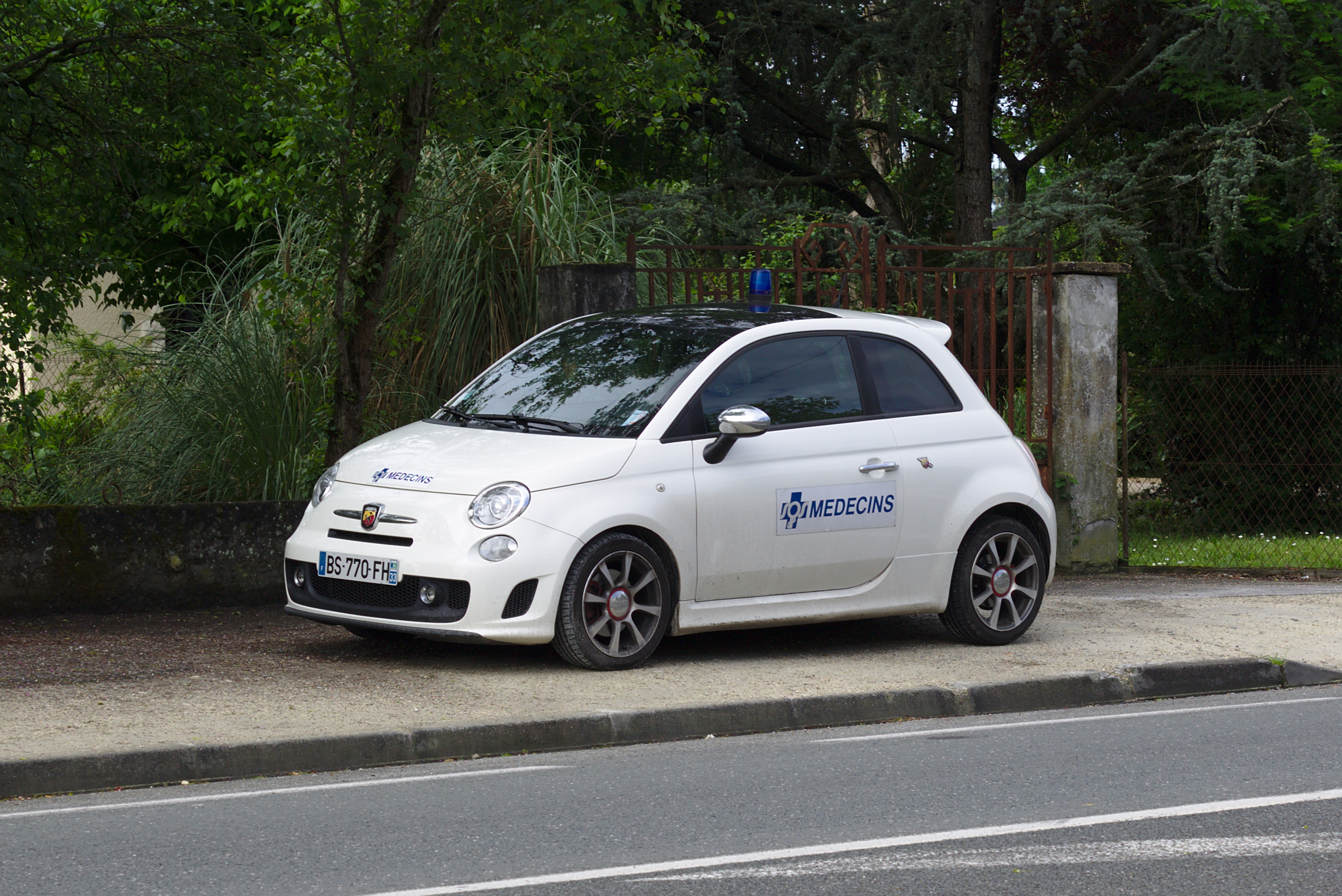
SOS Médecins's car.

SOS Médecins is a medical emergency service of France, which sends doctors directly to a residence instead of sending an ambulance - a practice often referred to as a house call. This works seven days a week, twenty-four hours a day, and participates with close liaison with the public emergency services (ambulance, fire brigade, hospital), and continuity of care in many urban centers and its periphery.

Its operational concept has been copied in other countries, such as in Belgium.

== Influence ==
Doctors of London, New York and Rome came to copy the mode of operation of the association. In Dakar (Senegal), Athens (Greece), Brussels (Belgium), Geneva (Switzerland), Beirut (SOS Doctors Of Lebanon), SOS Médecins participated in the inauguration of home care private medical services teams.

== See also ==
- Emergency medicine in France – SAMU (Service d'Aide Médicale Urgente)

== Bibliography ==
- Dr Lambiotte « Un nouveau service d'urgence », Le Monde, 19–20 juin 1966
- Jean Claude Larivière, « Les médecins de SOS Docteur Nuit » France Soir, 23 juillet 1966
- Non signé, « SOS téléphonique pour obtenir la nuit un médecin », L'Aurore, 20 juin 1966
- Patrick Magd, « Vaste remous autour de l'organisation des urgences », Le Figaro, 28 juin 1966
- Bruno Keller, « SOS Médecins décrié mais efficace », Le Quotidien du Médecin, 26 décembre 1973
- Journal Franz Weber numéro 86, octobre 2008, reprenant un article des années 60 en pages 29–32 : Franz Weber, « SOS samaritains de la nuit », Schweizer Illustrierte
- Non signé, « Les affaires du docteur Lascar », Le Point, 1996
- Non signé, « Génération juin 66 – SOS Médecins en route vers ses 50 ans – D'un drame, une idée géniale : un big bang dans le système de soins », Le Quotidien du médecin, 2015
- Non signé, « 2,5 millions d'interventions par an », Le Parisien, 2012
- Marion Leveau, Composition de la trousse d'urgence au sein de SOS Médecins France en 2014, thèse de doctorat, université Paris V, René Descartes, 2015
- Matthieu Nicolas, Évaluation en permanence de soins de la typologie des appels des structures SOS Médecins en nuit profonde entre 0h et 7h. Étude rétrospective en 2011 et 2012 sur un panel de 20 associations SOS Médecins en France, thèse de doctorat en médecine, université de Caen, 2014
- Romain Tinel, Phase d'atténuation de la pandémie à coronavirus SARS-CoV-2 et SOS Médecins Caen: étude observationnelle prospective de la gestion d'une crise sanitaire par une association de permanence et de continuité des soins ambulatoires, thèse de doctorat en médecine, université de Caen, 2020
