= Jean de Kervasdoué =

French economist (born 1944)

Jean de Kervasdoué (usually known as Jean de Kerguiziau de Kervasdoué) is a French economist born on 28 December 1944 in Lannion. He is chairholder of Economics and Health Services Management at the National Academy of Arts and Trades (CNAM) and a member of the French Academy of Technologies. He has been a general manager of hospitals.

An agricultural engineer at Institut National Agronomique Paris-Grignon, he has earned an MBA and a doctorate in socio-economics from Cornell University.

== Views on French healthcare ==
As an economic expert on hospitals, he has been very critical of the French healthcare system, citing the lack of attention given to patients and too much state intervention. He pleads for example for a greater autonomy of the hospitals and denounces the employees of the hospitals, which he says "confuse service of the public and public service, even defense of the public statute". He strongly criticises the excessive centralization of the health system and advocates for the complete autonomy of the hospitals.

He is very critical towards the media and the lack of professionalism of certain journalists. "every day, I am surprise by the mass of information on health and worrying aspect and opposed to the dedication of Charte de l'environnement, under its current form, the precautionary principle in the Constitution of 4 October 1958, thus writing: "The major fault of this precautionary principle, its original sin is a sin of pride. It makes believe that one could protect oneself from everything because one could always detect the cause of a potential catastrophe."

He calls its wishes a scientific, not political, debate on the environmental questions and is against those who he calls the "prophets of the apocalypse" and who play, according to him, on the environmental fears of society to impose their views without being justified scientifically. In particular, in The preachers of the Apocalypse, completely delirious with the ecological and medical, he denounces the "trickery" and "lies" of certain players of ecology. Jean de Kervasdoué considers that climate warning will touch first the inhabitants of poor countries. He considers that the only real possibilities of sustainable development pass by nuclear energy; in particular, he writes that this energy is for the mankind of the million times less mortal, less polluting, and less dangerous than coal. He also decides for the development of genetically modified organisms.

== Selective bibliography ==
- Les prêcheurs de l'apocalypse, pour en finir avec les délires écologiques et sanitaires, Plon, 2007, 250 p.
- L'hôpital vu du lit, Seuil, 2004, 167 p.
- La Crise des professions de santé, Dunod, 2003
- Notre État : le livre-vérité de la fonction publique (participation), Robert Laffont, 2000
- La santé intouchable : enquête sur une crise et ses remèdes, Editions J.-C. Lattès, 1996
