= Emergency medical services in France =

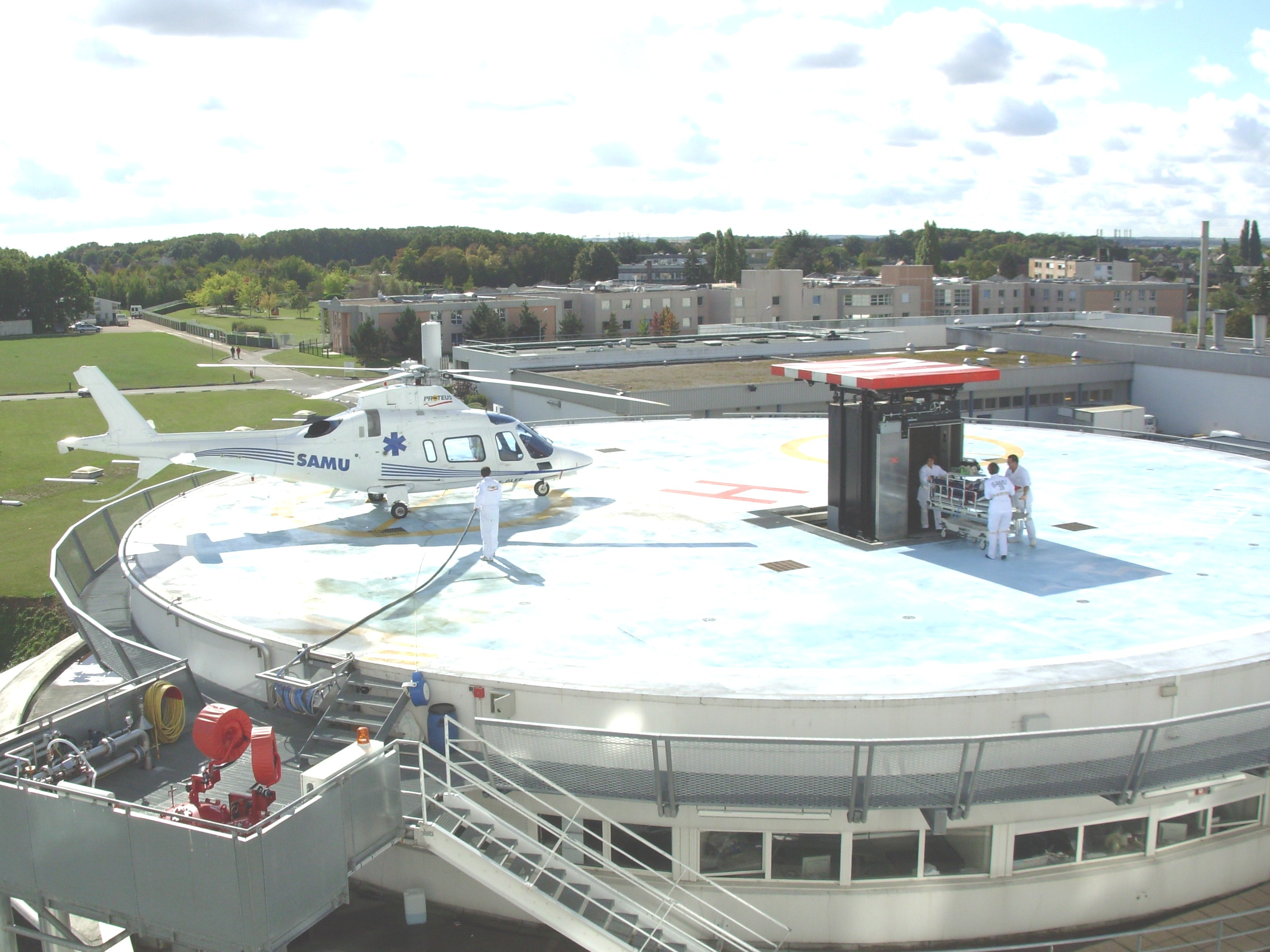
A typical French SAMU hospital with helicoptered MICU on the roof and a ground MICU on the basement in Dreux, France

Emergency medical services in France are provided by a mix of organizations under public health control. The central organizations that provide these services are known as a SAMU, which stands for Service d’aide médicale urgente (Urgent Medical Aid Service, lit. 'Service of urgent medical aid'). Local SAMU organisations operate the control rooms that answer emergency calls and dispatch medical responders. They also operate the SMUR (Service mobile d’urgence et réanimation – Mobile Emergency and Resuscitation Service), which refers to the ambulances and response vehicles that provide advanced medical care. Other ambulances and response vehicles are provided by the fire services and private ambulance services.

== Organization ==
=== SAMU organizations ===
The term SAMU may refer to either the overall integrated emergency medical service of France, or to a local organisation that coordinates the service. A law in 1986 defined SAMU organizations as hospital-based services providing permanent telephone support, choosing and dispatching the proper response for a phone call request. The service is organized based on the departments of France. Each department has a hospital-based SAMU organisation which is named with the department's unique two-digit number code. For example, SAMU 06 covers Alpes-Maritimes (including Nice) while SAMU 75 covers Paris.

Additionally, two SAMU have specific tasks:

- The Paris SAMU is responsible for providing service to high-speed trains (TGV) and Air France aircraft, while in flight.
- The Toulouse SAMU is responsible for providing service to ships at sea.

In addition to the mainland French departments, SAMU also operates in most of the offshore North and South American Départements, such as Guadeloupe (SAMU 971), Martinique, Guyane or Pacific and Indian French Islands (Tahiti Reunion).

=== Operations ===
The central component of SAMU is the dispatch centre where a team of physicians and assistants answer calls, triage the patients' complaints and respond to them. Their options include:

- Dispatching an ambulance or response vehicle.
- Directing the patient to present themselves at a place of care, such as a primary care clinic or hospital.
- Offering care advice over the telephone.

This means that the SAMU controls a variety of resources within a community from general practitioners to hospital intensive care services.

Due to the triage (called medical regulation) and use of alternative options, only about 65% of calls to SAMU result in an ambulance being sent. Current response time targets are for the responder to arrive at the scene within 10 minutes for 80% of responses, and within 15 minutes for 95% of responses.

== Ambulance provision ==
While the term ambulance is generally used in France for any type of ambulance, not all are officially called ambulances. For example, fire service ambulances are usually referred to as a VSAV (Rescue and Casualty Assistance Vehicle). The main three providers of ambulances are the SMUR service, fire services and private providers.

SMUR provides the more advanced emergency treatment, though all three providers can transport patients. Fire service ambulances have a crew of three or four, while SMUR and private company ambulances have a crew of two or three. The three types providers have different specialities. Fire service ambulance have training to provide first aid to major trauma cases, and their crews may also carry out rescues such as vehicle extrication.

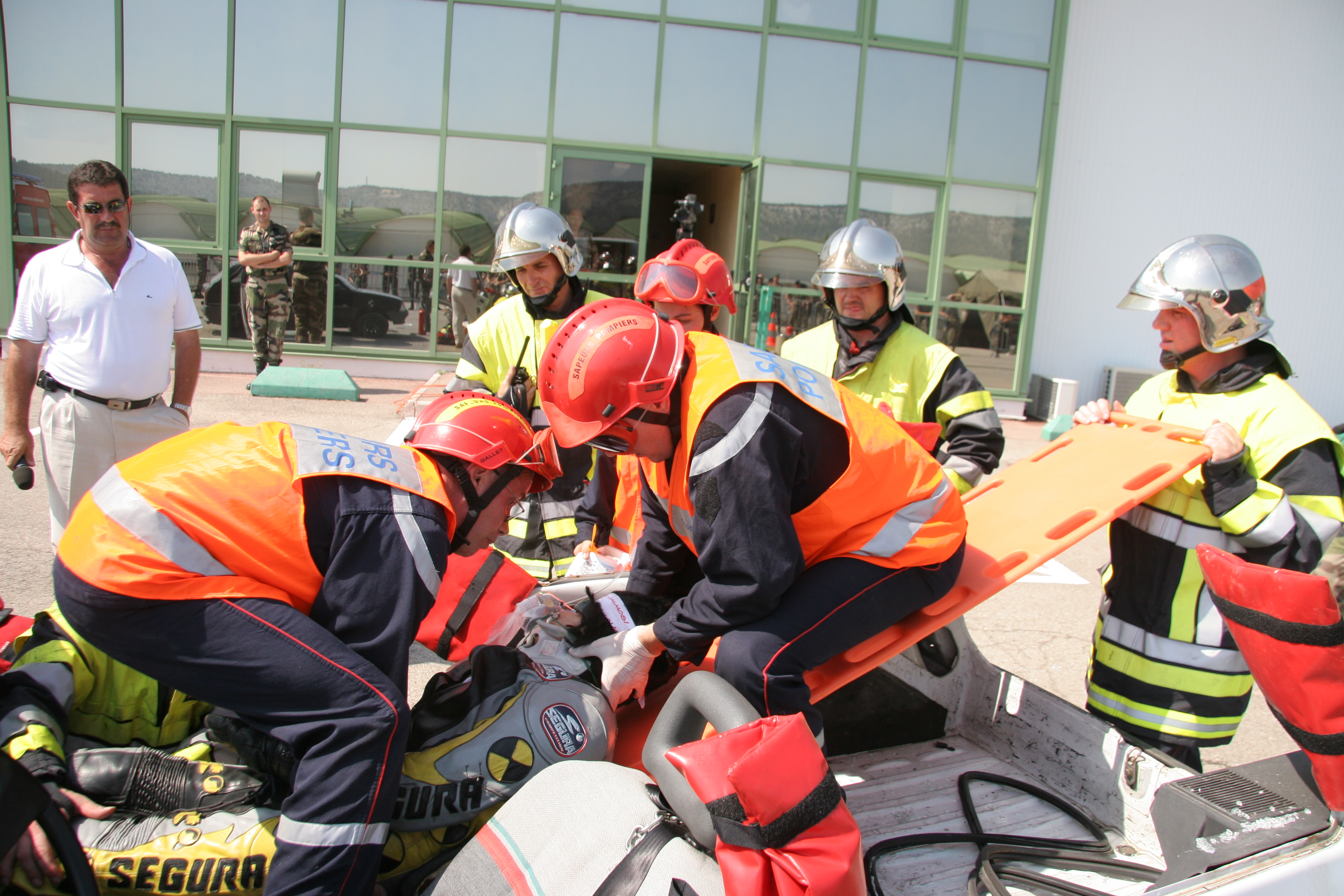
French fire service performing a vehicle extrication during a demonstration in 2007

Not all ambulances follow the European standard colour scheme for ambulances (CEN 1789), which was published by the European Committee for Standards. Most private company ambulances are white. The fire service ambulance are red but since 2010 they have often had yellow markings added.

=== Private ambulance services ===
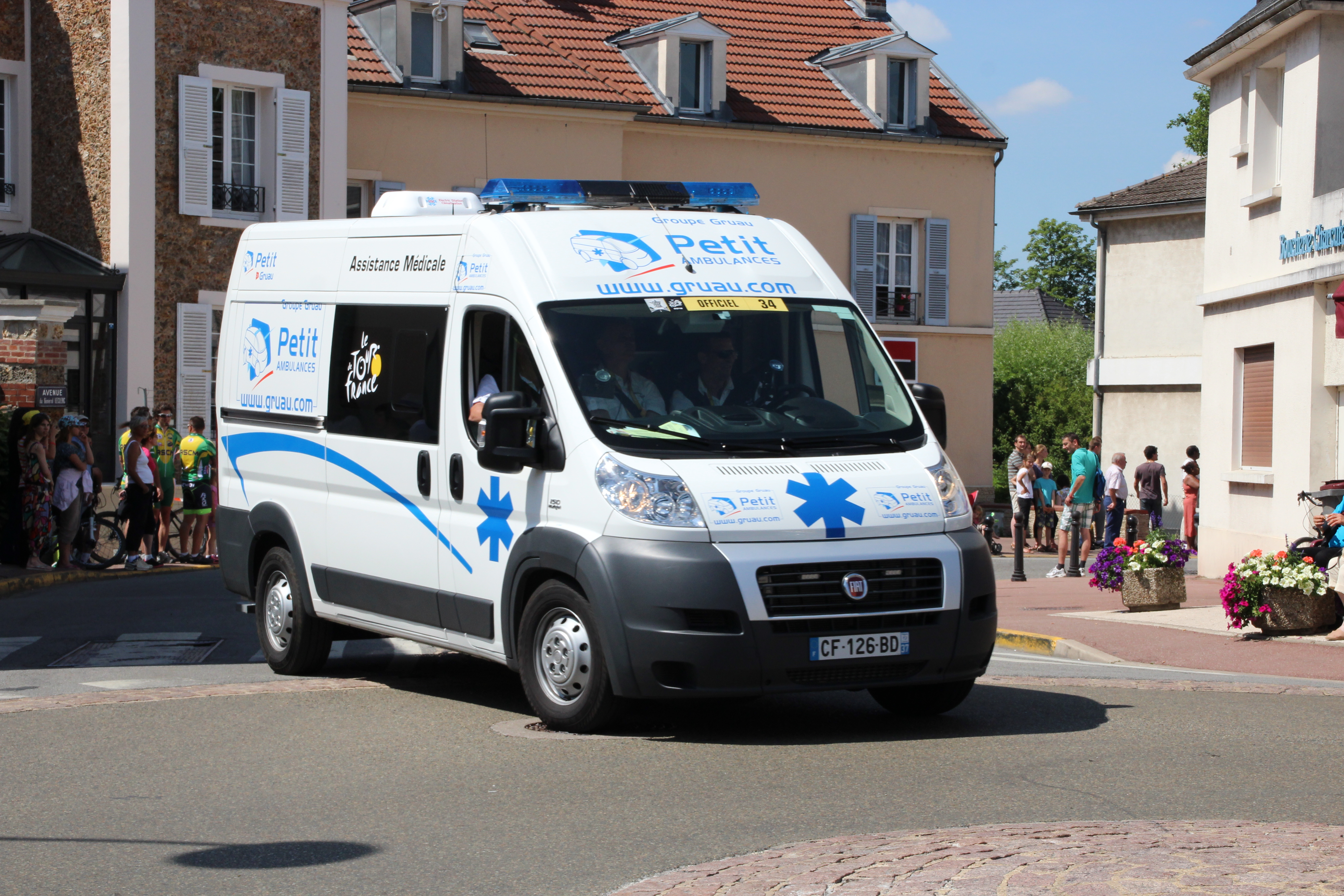
Private basic ambulance on the Tour de France in Saint-Rémy-lès-Chevreuse, France

Private companies are more likely to be sent to non-emergency and low-priority calls. Their vehicles are often not officially designated as an "ambulance"; relying instead on the more general term "light vehicle adapted to patient transport."

=== Fire department services ===
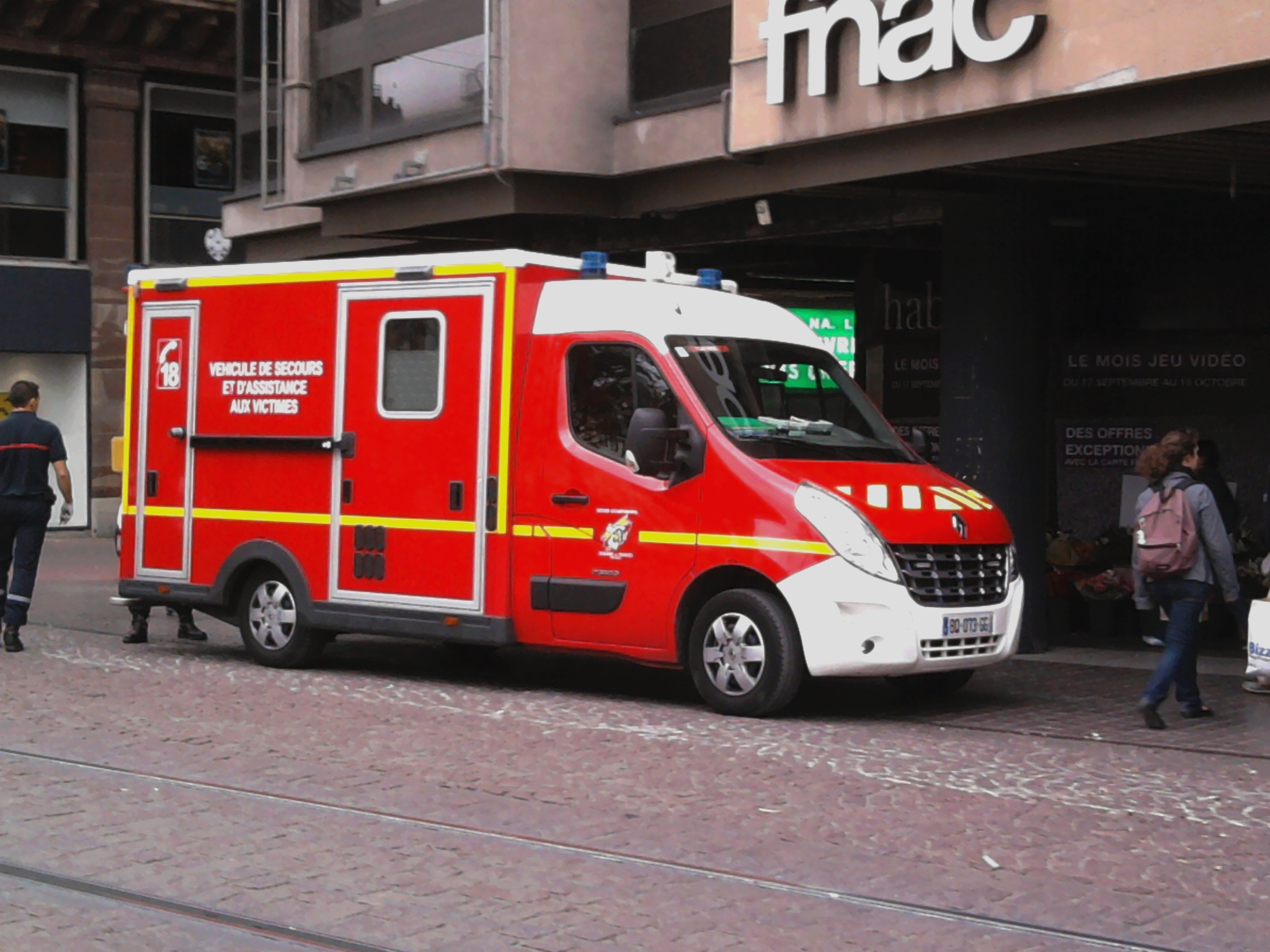
Ambulance (officially a VSAV) of the French fire service in Strasbourg, France

Local fire departments also respond to medical calls, and can send an ambulance, a multi-purpose response vehicle or even a fire apparatus. Here, the cross-trained firefighters will provide on scene care and transport for injuries or illness, but are usually backed up by a SMUR unit for more serious or complex cases. Firefighters are trained to provide basic life support (BLS) level care.

Although they also transport casualties and are, in any practical sense, ambulances, their vehicles are instead called a VSAV (véhicule de secours et d'assistance aux victimes – rescue and casualty assistance vehicle). Volunteer-staffed ambulances may be called a VPS (véhicules de premiers secours – first aid vehicle). The VSAV and VPS are considered to be means of bringing rescue workers and equipment onsite, with the evacuation of patients being only the logical result of the response, but not the primary duty of these response resources.

=== SMUR ===
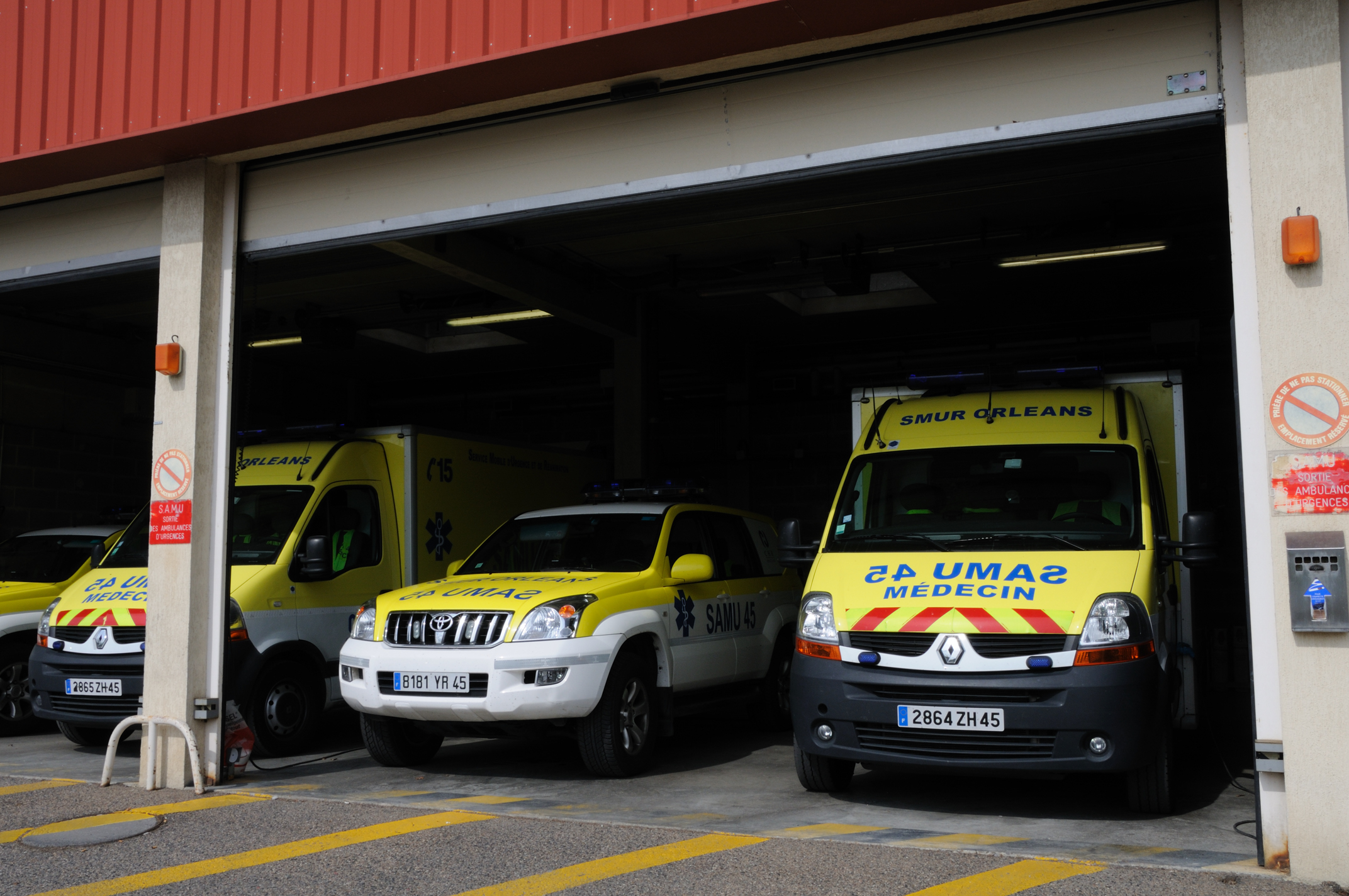
Emergency vehicles of Orléans SMUR

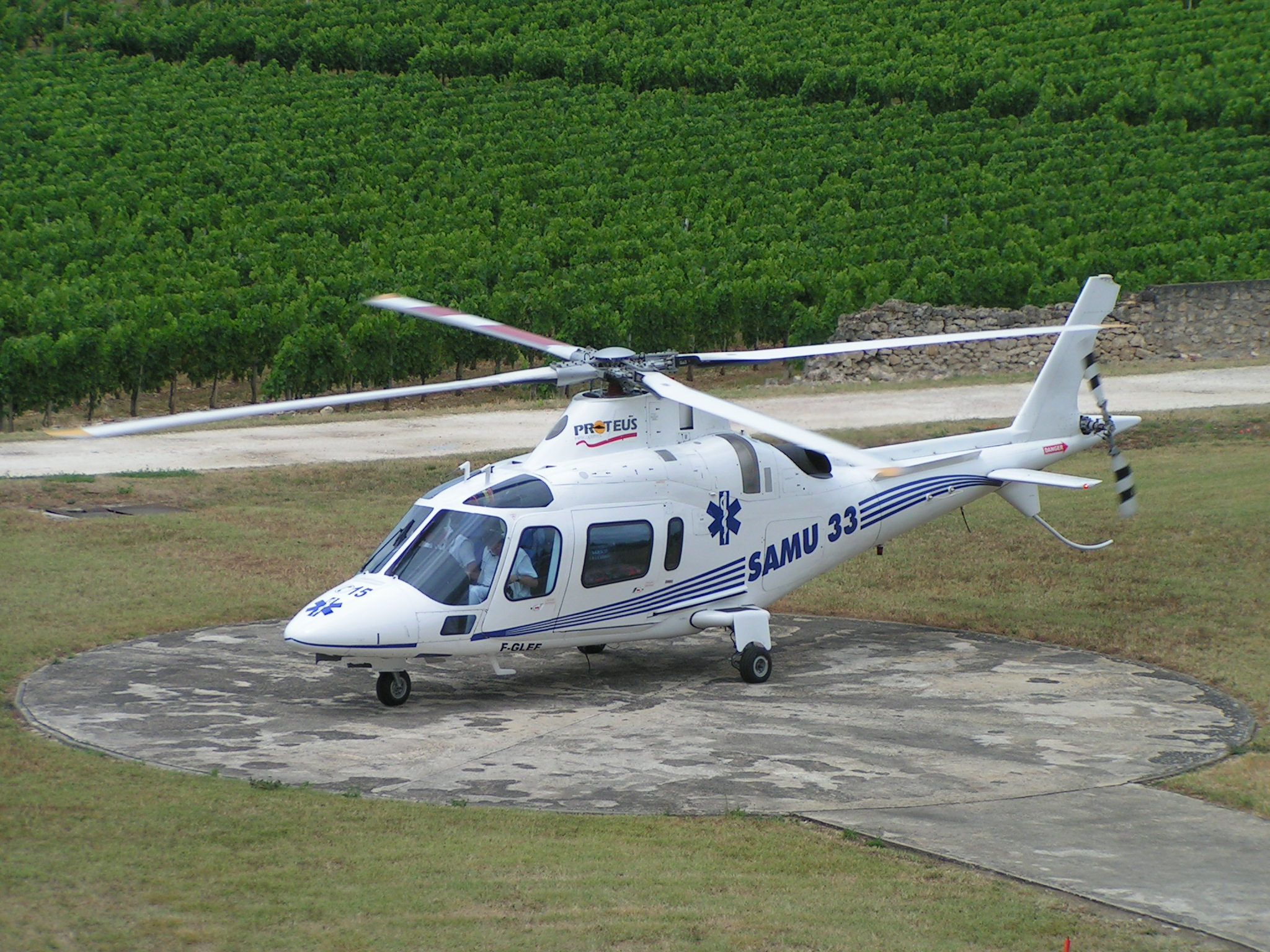
SAMU helicoptered MICU AgustaWestland AW109

SMUR (Service Mobile d'Urgence et Reanimation – Mobile Emergency and Resuscitation Service) units are advanced medical responders which are operated by the SAMU organisation. They are typically labelled as "SAMU", though that term actually refers to either the overall system or the local EMS organization that the SMUR units are part of.

The French philosophy on emergency medical care is to provide a higher level of care at the scene of the incident, and so SMUR units are staffed by a qualified physician along with a nurse and/or emergency medical technician. This contrasts with systems in other parts of the world, notably English-speaking countries, where care on scene is conducted primarily by paramedics or emergency medical technicians, with physicians only becoming involved on scene at the most complex or large scale incidents.

The result is that a SMUR unit will typically spend a long time on scene compared with a paramedic ambulance in a different system, as the physician may conduct a full set of observations, examinations and interventions before removal to hospital.

Despite being hospital-based, SMUR units may choose to transport a patient to an alternative hospital if the latter is better suited to treating the patient.

== Hospital standards for SAMU ==
French hospitals (whether publicly or privately run) must operate an emergency department (service spécialisé d'accueil et de traitement des urgences) only if it is capable of treating the common trauma and illness conditions that are likely to present. This normally includes a resuscitation unit, general and internal medicine, cardio-vascular medicine, pediatrics, anesthesiology-resuscitation, orthopedic surgery and oncology, including obstetrics. The exception would be for specialised units, which only admit specific pathologies or specific types of patients (e.g. pediatrics). These units are termed pôle spécialisé d'accueil et de traitement des urgences.

The hospital must have two operating rooms (and a recovery room) with personnel on duty that allow operation at any time, as well as support services that can perform additional examination or analysis at any time, such as medical imaging (radiography, medical ultrasonography, CAT scanners, haematology, toxicology laboratory etc.).

The specialized service is managed by an emergency physician. An emergency physician must always be "on-call" and a specialized physician can be called at any time. In addition the team must have two nurses, care assistants (and possibly child care assistants), a social worker and a receptionist, with all of them having received specific education for dealing with emergency cases.

The service is organized in three zones:

- a reception zone,
- a zone for examination and treatment (including intensive treatment).
- a zone for monitoring over short duration (patients waiting to go out or for a transfer to another service).

Most services also have a massive crowd room that are designed to allow care of a large number of patients, outside of the normal levels of presenting patients. These plan blanc units are designed to cope with major incidents or epidemics.

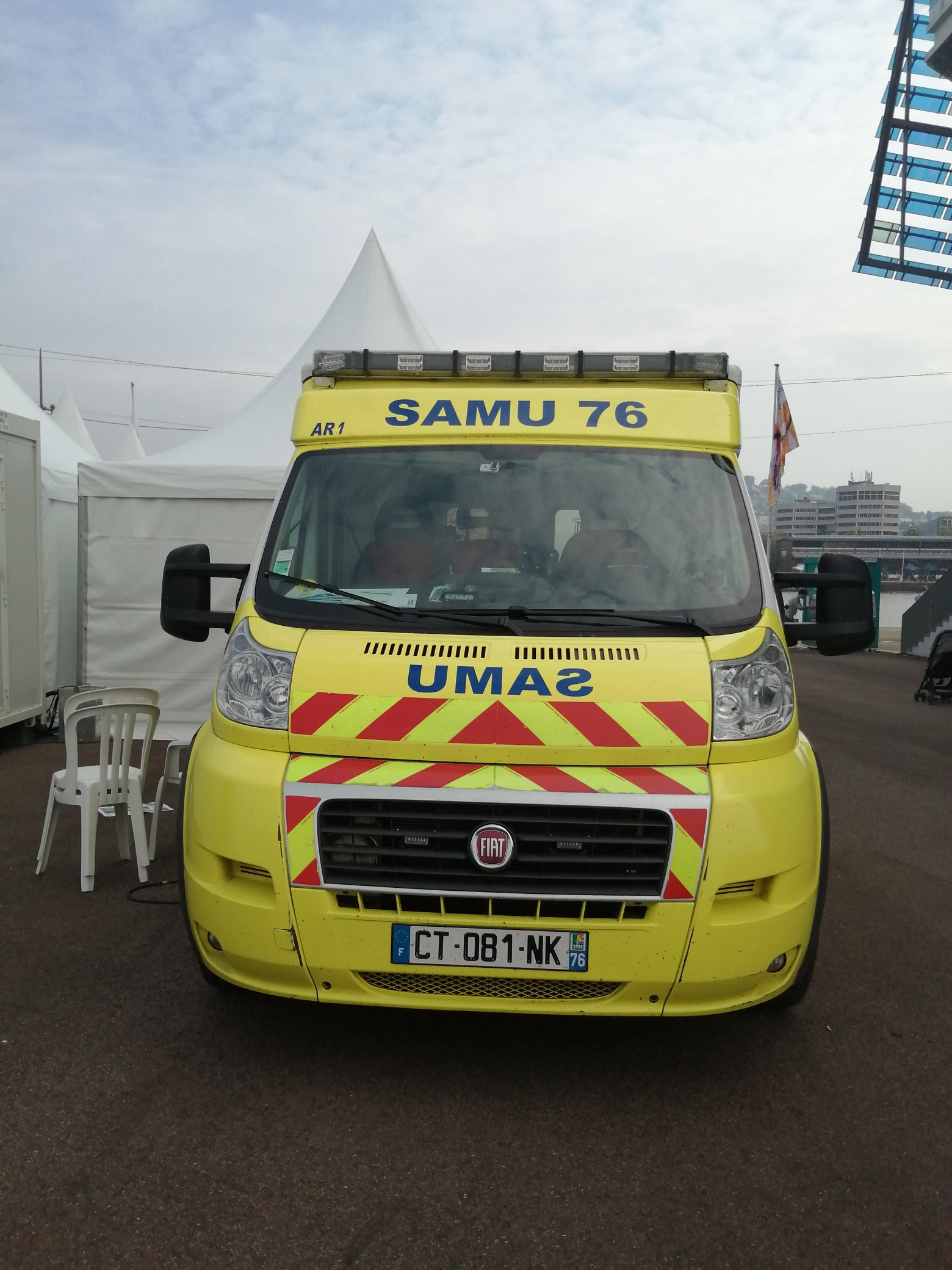
Vehicle of EMS in Rouen

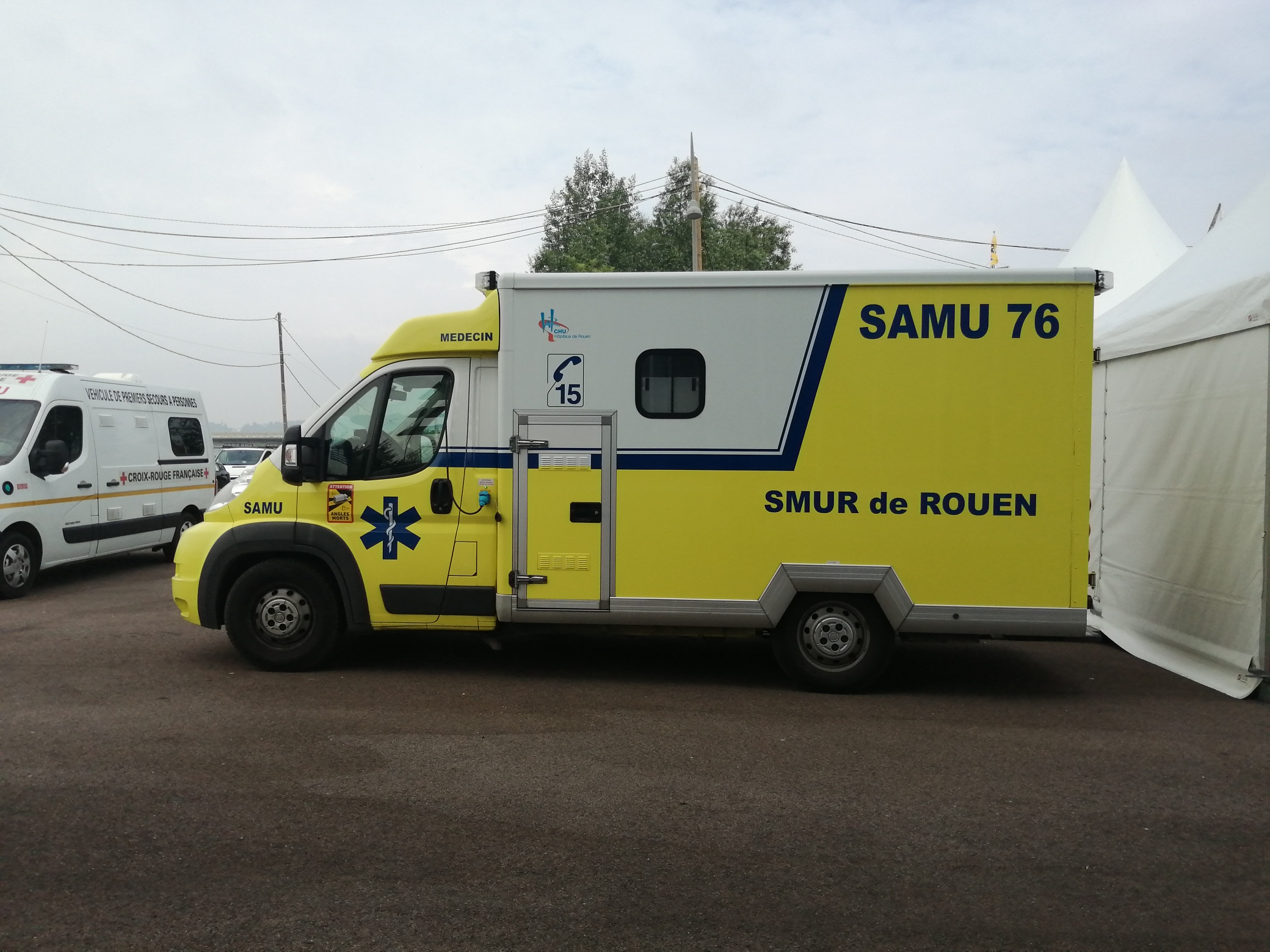
Vehicle of EMS in Rouen

A local SAMU organisation carries out the day to day monitoring of response vehicles and hospital emergency departments, and coordinates with the SAMU organisations of the neighbouring departments. It also acts as the regional medical emergency response center (MERC). (Note: Comparable to a system used in some USA States like Oklahoma.) In the case of disaster, they form a network that can plan the first emergency phase planned response, called Plans blanc, and of secondary ground or aerial transport if necessary.

=== Medical speciality training ===
Emergency medicine in hospitals has only recently been recognized as a distinct medical specialty in France, and efforts to further recognise pre-hospital emergency medicine as a sub-specialty are at an early stage. Many SMUR/MICU physicians are actually in training for other specialties, such as anaesthesiology, who have special interest or are gaining experience in critical emergency medicine. The system relies on general practitioners and physicians from other specialties 'filling the gap' when emergency physicians are not available.

The situation is further complicated by the fact that the physicians staffing the SMUR units are among the lowest-paid in Europe. Salaries have recently improved somewhat, in 2020 it was reported that these physicians who are, for the most part, full-time employees of public hospitals, had a salary between €3,113 gross and €16,003 gross per month i.e. an average salary of €9,558 gross per month. This economic situation has resulted in high turnover and some difficulty in staffing positions. However, the recognition of emergency medicine as an in-hospital specialty in France and elsewhere in Europe is likely to result in the evolution of that system towards more comprehensive in-hospital emergency services.

This will ultimately, in turn, result in physicians becoming less likely to respond to emergencies outside the hospital, though they are still expected to play a major role in the immediate future. Since 1986, fire department-based rescue ambulances have had the option of providing resuscitation service (reanimation) using specially-trained nurses. operating on protocols

== Public access ==
France, along with the rest of the continental European Union (and the UK) uses the emergency telephone number available across all members 112, which gives access to police, fire and ambulance services. However, the legacy emergency number of "15" for SAMU and "18" for fire department VSAV are still in use.

== Funding and costs ==
The use of SAMU is free, but abuse is punishable by law.

In France, the 100 or so SAMUs (one for each Département) are all operated by public hospitals. Public hospitals (unlike private hospitals, and France has both) receive government funding. France operates on a system of universal health care. Patients have freedom to choose physicians, hospitals etc., and there are prices set for each type of service.

When operating in the public system, patients are asked to co-pay a portion of the cost for each type of care that they receive. To illustrate, a patient requiring hospitalization is liable for 20 percent of costs for the first month, and nothing thereafter.

What this means in terms of funding is that the SAMUs and their SMUR response teams are funded by the government, by means of the hospital funding scheme. They do charge a fee for service, and for a typical patient, 65% of this cost will be covered by the government health insurance scheme and the balance covered by optional additional private insurance. By French law, in an emergency any French hospital or SAMU must treat any patient, regardless of their ability to pay.

As a measure against system abuse, the SAMU physician may refuse to sign the patient's "treatment certificate", resulting in the patient being liable for the full cost of services provided, although in practice, this is rarely done. Most French citizens also carry private health insurance in order to cover all co-payment charges.

In some circumstances, particularly on low-priority calls, patients being transported to hospital may be asked to pay for service in advance, and then seek reimbursement from the government insurance scheme or their private insurance. Although not regarded as ambulances in France, fire department ambulances, when used, may provide transportation to hospital, albeit with a considerable charge. All requests for ambulance service are processed by the local SAMU, which will determine what type of assistance and transportation resources are sent; the patient has no choice in the matter when it is an Intensive Urgent Care Need.

== See also ==
- Health in France
- SOS Médecins
