= Claudia Wright =

Australian journalist (1934–2005)

Claudia Wright (née Little) (1934 – 2005) was an Australian journalist. Wright was controversial in her time, credited with "br[eaking] down many of the barriers confronting female journalists". She was outspoken, noted for her feminism and her criticism of the Catholic Church. She was also one of the first western journalists to interview Arab and Israeli leaders in the 1970s. Wright left Melbourne in the 1980s to become a correspondent in the United States. However, she was diagnosed with Alzheimers in the late 1980s and returned to Melbourne where she entered a nursing home in 1995. She died in 2005.

== Early life ==
Claudia Little was born in Bendigo on 17 June 1934. She had some Chinese ancestry, immigrants who came to Australia during the gold rush. She attended Golden Square State School.

== Career ==
=== Early career ===
Wright first worked for the Bendigo Advertiser. She moved to Melbourne in the 1950s. After leaving Bendigo, Wright joined the Melbourne Herald, working on the paper's social and fashion columns. She was later promoted to the position of editor of the women's section. Wright used the position to highlight social hypocrisy and corruption. While at the Herald, Wright got a reputation as a feminist. In 1975, Wright led a protest against a derogatory Canberra Times editorial of a women and politics conference. Her fame at this time can be gleaned from the fact that she was cast as a guest star of one episode of The Box, playing herself, a journalist unafraid to ask the difficult questions, at the press launch of the self-styled megastar Deirdre Matthews.

Wright was also a columnist for The Australian Women's Weekly.

She was dismissed from the Herald by Rupert Murdoch, after appearing in a series of ads for bedsheets, and became his lifelong critic.

After leaving the Herald, Wright moved on to a popular morning slot at 3AW with long running cohosts Ormsby Wilkins and Norman Banks. At 3AW, she covered the Middle East, meeting Arab and Israeli leaders. She was also critical of the Catholic Church.

After management of the station changed, her position became precarious. Some reports say she resigned live on air. A report on her dismissal in the Melbourne Age elides the on-air remarks which actually led to her departure but implies they were related to Anne Kerr, the second wife of former Governor-General John Kerr, and made by Wright during a conversation with Graeme Coddington and Banks. After voicing an opinion (presumably on Mrs. Kerr, who was a controversial figure) she suggested she was likely to be sacked and indeed, following the end of the program, she was met by station manager Richard Gray who 'presented her severance cheque and told her to leave her office by 5 pm.' Wright was at the height of her career at this time, and one of Australia's two best-known broadcasters, along with John Laws.

=== Move to the United States ===
She moved to the United States and worked as a correspondent for numerous publications, including the NPR, New Statesman, New York Times, LA Times, The Washington Post, and Foreign Affairs.

Wright was diagnosed with dementia in 1988 and was public about its effects. She left the U.S. and returned home to Melbourne.

== Personal life and death ==
Wright married fellow journalist, Geoff Wright at All Saints Cathedral, Bendigo, in 1958. The couple had two children, one daughter, Edwina and one son, the journalist Lincoln Wright. Wright later married John Helmer in 1978, an Australian-born journalist and Russian scholar. Together, they had a son, Tully. Tully Helmer was nominated in 2000 for Young Australian of the Year for Community Service.

In 1989, she returned to Australia. She lived in Toorak until 1995, when she moved into a nursing home in Kew.

Wright died on 29 January 2005. She was 70. She was survived by her three children, her second husband, her mother and a sister.

== Awards ==
- Wright was awarded a Woodrow Wilson Fellowship by the Smithsonian Institution.

== Posthumous rumours of KGB involvement ==
In 1994, a former KGB officer, Yuri Shvets, claimed that Russian intelligence had utilised two "agents of influence": a British journalist and her associate who had worked in the Carter White House. Shvets identified them only by the code names "Sputnista" and "Socrates" but withheld their actual identities. Insight on the News later wrote that Wright, then a journalist with the British left-wing publication New Statesman, was "Sputnista".

Victor Cherkashin, a former deputy chief of the KGB's Washington operations, revisited these claims in his 2005 memoir, Spy Handler. Cherkashin wrote that Helmer had not been an agent or recruitment target but he did not address the claims involving Wright. He also said that a "Washington-based British journalist" had occasionally provided information to the KGB, including the identity of Oleg Gordievsky, a Russian double agent working for MI6. The Sunday Times speculated that this journalist might have been Wright, although Gordievsky himself expressed scepticism, questioning how a journalist could have known about his covert work with British intelligence.
