= List of TV Nation episodes =

Michael Moore's 1990s TV series

The following is an episode list for the television series TV Nation. Written, directed, and hosted by Michael Moore, the show premiered in the United States on NBC on July 19, 1994. After the broadcast of the eighth episode, the show was subsequently cancelled by NBC, but was picked up by Fox for the summer of 1995. A total of 17 episodes were produced during the show's two seasons.

== Episodes ==
=== Season 1 ===
The first season of TV Nation ran from July 19, 1994, to a special New Year's episode. The following table includes short summaries of the individual segments in each episode.

No. overall	No. in season	Title	Original U.S. airdate	Runtime
1	1	"Pilot"	45 minutes	July 19, 1994
"Free Trade in Mexico" - TV Nation takes advantage of the cheaper labor created in Mexico under the terms of the North American Free Trade Agreement (NAFTA), hiring a Mexican version of Moore known as "NAFTA Mike" to accompany a laid-off GM worker on a tour of a Mexican GM plant.; "Taxi" - Who will have an easier time getting a cab in New York City; Yaphet Kotto, a distinguished black actor, or Louis Bruno, a convicted white felon? As it turned out, the convicted white felon was chosen over the black actor many times. Five years after this episode aired actor Danny Glover also noticed the discrimination, and filed a complaint with the City Taxi and Limousine Commission.; "Appleton Prison" - Correspondent Merrill Markoe visits a brand new prison in Appleton, Minnesota which doesn't have any prisoners.; "Love Canal" - Sixteen years after a toxic waste spill prompted the evacuation of the Love Canal neighborhood of Niagara Falls, New York, some realtors are trying to convince people to move back.; "Looking for Missiles" - Moore travels to Russia to find the missile still aimed at his hometown of Flint, Michigan, hoping to then convince the Russians to redirect it.
2	2	"NBC Show 2"	45 minutes	July 26, 1994
"CEO Challenge" - The CEOs of IBM, Palmolive, Philip Morris, and Ford Motor Company are asked to perform simple tasks using their respective company's products. Alexander Trotman was the only CEO to participate, changing the oil on a Ford Explorer.; "AIDS" - A look at brokers who sell the life insurance policies of AIDS patients at discount prices.; "The New KKK" - While politicians use public relations experts to take advantage of the media, not many people realize hate groups do the same thing. TV Nation meets the "National Director" of the new, media-savvy Ku Klux Klan to see how the Klan's rhetoric has changed.; "Kuwait" - In light of its liberation in the Gulf War, TV Nation travels to Kuwait to see just how many freedoms liberated Kuwaities actually enjoy.; "Pets on Prozac" - Correspondent Merrill Markoe looks into the effects of Prozac on household pets who were prescribed the drug by their veterinarians.
3	3	"NBC Show 3"	45 minutes	August 2, 1994
"A Day with Dr. Death" - TV Nation visits Dr. Jack Kevorkian at his home in Michigan to find out what he does in his spare time.; "Lobbyist" - In a test to see how much control lobbyists exert in the United States government, TV Nation hires a lobbyist to see what can be accomplished for $5,000. This eventually yields the introduction in the House of Representatives of a resolution to designate August 16, 1994, "TV Nation Day", although it never did pass.; "North Dakota" - An investigation into why North Dakota is the least visited state in the USA.; "Amazon Avon" - TV Nation correspondent Louis Theroux follows Avon representatives in the Amazon who sell cosmetics to women that can cost up to 13 times their daily wage.; "Sludge Train" - The show follows the path of sludge from New York City to Sierra Blanca, Texas, where the waste is spread in the desert outside of town by the Merco company.
4	4	"Product Placement Night"	45 minutes	August 9, 1994
"O.J. Night" – TV Nation travels to O. J. Simpson's Ford dealer to learn about the "O.J. Special", and to kick off a series of product placements throughout the episode.; "1-800-TOURISM" – Few people know U.S. prison labor is used by corporations and some state tourism departments to book vacations over the phone.; "Hot Springs" – While Bill Clinton's hometown is often cited as Hope, Arkansas, TV Nation travels to the town where Clinton really grew up, the resort city of Hot Springs, Arkansas.; "Lord Mike" – TV Nation learns that all it takes to become British nobility, (Lord Moore of Foleshill) is $8,000, and that the Diners Club card is accepted as payment for it.; "Health Care Olympics" – A contest between the health care systems of Canada, the U.S., and Cuba featuring play-by-play commentary from Bob Costas and Ahmad Rashad. The original victor of the contest was Cuba, but the outcome was censored by NBC to show Canada as the winner. This segment was also a forerunner to Moore's 2007 documentary Sicko.
5	5	"TV Nation Day"	45 minutes	August 16, 1994
"TV Nation Day" - Moore celebrates "TV Nation Day" in the town of Fishkill, New York.; "Millennium" - Correspondent Louis Theroux looks into four groups who believed the end of the world would occur in the year 2000.; "Prison Advisor" - An advisor prepares TV Nation viewers who may enter prison soon.; "Haulin'" - TV Nation gives Communism a rock band style "last tour" across America by packing an 18-wheeled tractor trailer with Communist merchandise, and driving through the southern United States.; "Bosnia" - Moore separately visits with the U.S. ambassadors to both Serbia and Croatia in hopes of spurring peace between them.
6	6	"Fifth Week Anniversary Special"	45 minutes	August 21, 1994
This episode featured highlights from the first five episodes.
7	7	"Gun Night"	45 minutes	August 23, 1994
"Guns" - The correspondents shoot guns.; "Neighbors" - TV Nation sends a serial killer to a typical suburban neighborhood to see what the neighborhood knows.; "New York/New Jersey" - TV Nation threatens to move production to New Jersey in order to get a tax break. Moore goes directly to then New York City mayor Rudy Giuliani to see what the show can get.; "Talk Show" - TV Nation tries to figure out where all the crazy talk show guests come from.
8	8	"Golf Night"	45 minutes	August 30, 1994
"Golf Night" - Golf pro Rodger Jabara shares golfing tips; and how to improve the show.; "Caning" - A visit to Great Britain to investigate more about how effective caning is as a means of discipline.; "Sabotage" - A look at the tactics some employees use against bosses who don't respect them.; "Corporate Consultants" - TV Nation hires a consultant to trim the fat on the payroll, just like major corporations do.; "Direct Mail" - An experiment to see who will get a larger response via direct mail; a young couple in need, or Jeffrey Dahmer.
9	9	"1994 Year End Special"	50 minutes	December 28, 1994
"Almost Live from Times Square" - TV Nation gives jacuzzi limousine rides to members of the most hated groups in America including smokers, landlords, telemarketers, and satanists.; "Corp-Aid" - In the vein of Live Aid, TV Nation holds a benefit concert for Exxon featuring the Meat Puppets.; "White House Security Guard" - Correspondent Louis Theroux hires a private security guard for the White House.; "Didn't Die in '94" - Going against the grain of year-end TV specials that look at who died in the past year, TV Nation highlights the people that didn't die in 1994.; "Send the Troops in '95 (Where to Send Our Boys in '95)" - A vote for the American public to decide where American troops will invade in 1995.; "Meet the Republicans" - A look at careers and rhetoric of the Republican Party.; "Predictions (for the New Year)" - Steven Wright consults a number of experts on the major events that will or will not occur in 1995.; "5,000,000 New Jobs" - TV Nation talks to a number of people in Scranton, Pennsylvania to see what "new" jobs they have gotten and how their lives have improved since the creation of these jobs during the Clinton administration.

=== Season 2 ===
Fox decided to air TV Nation's second season during the summer of 1995. The first show aired on July 21, and ran for seven consecutive weeks in the U.S. until September 8.

No. overall	No. in season	Title	Original U.S. airdate	Runtime
10	1	"We're #1"	45 minutes	July 21, 1995, 8pm EST
"Bruno for President" - TV Nation runs convicted felon Louie Bruno as its candidate in the 1996 Presidential election.; "We're #1" - A visit to cities in America that are number one in some infamous category, such as Playboy subscriptions or carjackings.; "Beach Party" - TV Nation invades the public beach of Greenwich, Connecticut, which is restricted only to residents of Greenwich. After the busload of New Yorkers TV Nation has brought to the beach is turned away, correspondent Janeane Garofalo and some of the New Yorkers take a boat out to sea and then swim onto the beach. The city of Greenwich was later brought to court over the issue.; "Crime Scene Cleanup" - A look at the Barnes, a couple who started a lucrative crime scene cleanup business.; "Slaves" - TV Nation travels to Mississippi to acquire some slaves before the state officially outlaws slavery.; "Crackers" - The introduction of Crackers the Corporate Crime Fighting Chicken, a seven-foot chicken that takes action against corporate criminals across the country. In this segment, Crackers talks to New York City mayor Rudy Giuliani about tax breaks given to First Boston financial to stay in New York, even though the company left.
11	2	"Payback Night"	45 minutes	July 28, 1995, 8pm EST
"Payback Night" - After asking people on the street what annoys them, TV Nation visits CEOs at the heart of the complaints, performing tasks like setting off ten car alarms outside the house of a CEO of a car alarm maker, or lifting and dropping a garbage dumpster outsider the owner of a garbage company.; "KGB" - The show hires a former KGB officer named Yuri Shvets to begin conducting investigations. Shvets' first mission is to confirm that former U.S. President Richard Nixon is actually dead.; "NEA" - In response to members of Congress who want to eliminate funding for the National Endowment for the Arts, the show visits privately funded museums to examine the quality of their offerings, visiting such places as the Kentucky Fried Chicken Museum.; "A-Bomb" - A visit to a man in Idaho who unknowingly purchased the remnants of an atomic bomb factory in a U.S. government scrap metal auction.; "Jerusalem Syndrome" - TV Nation correspondent Louis Theroux investigates the phenomenon of visitors to the city of Jerusalem believing they are Jesus Christ upon reaching the holy site, a condition known as Jerusalem Syndrome.; "Johns of Justice" - Citing long lines for women's restrooms at theaters, sporting events, and other venues, TV Nation rents a flatbed truck and many portable toilets, taking them to the aforementioned venues.
12	3	"War Night"	unknown	August 4, 1995, 8pm EST
"War Night" - Civil War Reenactors reenact more recent battles in their authtentic Civil War uniforms, including the fall of Saigon, the Battle of Hiroshima, a battle between Tom Arnold and Roseanne, and the battle that resulted when Elizabeth Hurley picked up Hugh Grant from Heathrow Airport.; "Cobb County" - TV Nation takes note of the fact that Cobb County, Georgia, home to outspoken "big government" critic Newt Gingrich, is the third largest receiver of federal funds. The show then tries to relieve Cobb County of government interference by closing its federally funded highways, schools, sewer system, and senior center.; "Electronic Sniffer" - The invention of machines that can detect different smells threatens the jobs of people who test products like deordorant and air freshener. TV Nation visits companies that make products like those and pit the human sniffers against their machine counterparts.; "Helltown" - After the Southern Baptist Church published a map of Alabama depicting which counties have the most "unsaved" residents, TV Nation visits the county with the most "lost" souls, and attempts to save them from eternal damnation.; "School of Assassins" - A look at a US government run School of Americas in Georgia that trains Latin America soldiers in "population control."; "Crackers in Philly" - Crackers travels to Philadelphia in search of corporate crime, discovering that banks in the city charge up to $30 for bounced check fees, even if you're not the one responsible for bouncing the check.; "Widgery" - Insight into the firm of Widgery and Associates, the legitimate polling firm that conducts all of TV Nation's polls.
13	4	"Love Night"	45 minutes	August 11, 1995, 8pm EST
"Love Night" - The show spreads some love to U.S. hate groups, doing things like sending a gay men's choir to sing outside the home of Senator Jesse Helms.; "America's Most Wanted" - After being detained by Washington, D.C. police over 20 times because he resembles a fugitive, TV Nation uses billboards and radio ads in Washington to inform police that BET lighting director Brian Anthony Harris is not wanted.; "Aquariums" - An investigation into aquariums built in places like Camden, New Jersey and Long Beach, California in the hopes that they could help revive tourism and the inner cities of those communities.; "Militia" - TV Nation visits the Michigan Militia and encourages them to put down their arms and participate in democracy. Militia Commander Norm Olsen bakes a cake, and later the Militia members travel to a local carnival where they ride the Ferris Wheel and sing "Kumbaya."; "KGB" - Former KGB agent Yuri Shvets investigates TV Nation's competition, including Unsolved Mysteries, Family Matters, and Diagnosis: Murder to see what those shows are doing to win in the Neilsen ratings.
14	5	"Canada Night"	45 minutes	August 25, 1995, 8pm EST
"Canada Night" - A tribute to Canada throughout the episode, as the show smuggles illegal Canadians across the United States border, and Moore sings the Canadian National Anthem before a Major League Baseball game between the Toronto Blue Jays and the Detroit Tigers.; "Contract with America" - TV Nation tries to enforce the Contract With America, a 1994 effort by the Republican party to win back control of Congress. Specifically, TV Nation notes the Contract says members of Congress must abide by all the laws regular United States citizens do. TV Nation then attempts to park a car in the "Members Only" spaces at National Airport, receive free medical care from Bethesda Naval Hospital, and use the services of the congressional cosmetologist.; "Ted Nugent" - Ted Nugent, rock legend and National Rifle Association board member, gives the show a tour of his Michigan farm while commenting on topics ranging from assault weapons to Janet Reno.; "Crackers in St. Louis" - Crackers goes to the St. Louis area town of Doe Run, Missouri to confront the lead battery factory there. The citizens of the town believe their children have been poisoned by the lead runoff from the factory, so Crackers conducted a series of lead tests and took the results to the state environmental office.; "Falklands" - Argentina promised to pay each citizen of the Falklands Islands $1,000,000 if they became a part of Argentina and renounced their British citizenship. TV Nation finds Falkland residents have little interest in the deal, but that people in the village of Maerdy in Wales were much more willing to renounce their British citizenship for $1,000,000.
15	6	"Fox Show 6"	45 minutes	September 1, 1995, 8pm EST
"Mike Hugs All 50 Governors" - After the new Republican-controlled Congress says it wants to return power to the States, TV Nation tries to touch that power by hugging the governors of all 50 states.; "Psy-Ops at O.J." - The show hires a retired U.S. Army psychological operations expert to help conduct a "psy-op" program to destabilize and reduce the massive amount of O.J. Simpson media coverage.; "Rosemont" - The wealthy Chicago suburb of Rosemont, Illinois decided to place guard booths on public streets leading into the city, allowing only people who can prove they are residents of Rosemont in. TV Nation then sets up its own guard booth on the outskirts of Rosemont to prevent the town's residents from entering Chicago.; "New Unions" - TV Nation looks at new groups of non-industrial workers who are beginning to unionize, such as the Buffalo Bills cheerleading squad and cartoon characters at Disney World.; "Endangered White Men" - The show assembles a panel of white male experts to examine the threat from the white man's supposed enemies, like minorities and women.; "America's Most Wanted Part 2" - After receiving a number of African-American viewer responses to the "Most Wanted" segment, rapper Doug E. Fresh takes the names of these TV Nation viewers to the FBI in Washington, D.C. to the tell agency that these people are not wanted by law enforcement officials.; "Fan Mail" - TV Nation's candidate in the 1996 Presidential Election, Louie Bruno, answers viewer fan mail along with his campaign manager Lucky.
16	7	"Bully Reunion Night"	45 minutes	September 8, 1995, 8pm EST
"Bully Reunion Night" - Each TV Nation correspondent is reunited with their bully from high school.; "Confession" - Janeane Garofalo visits twenty Catholic churches in the New York City area to confess the same sin in order to see which church hands out the harshest punishment. (NOTE: Michael Moore originally presented the idea in his first meeting with NBC executives about TV Nation. It met with much laughter and positive reception, despite Moore's instance that, "think of all the hate mail you'll get from your Catholic viewers--including me!" Despite Moore's reservations, the segment was filmed for the Pilot episode of TV Nation, with the "recovering Catholic" Garofalo eager to do the piece. Confident he would "burn in eternal hell" if he ran the segment, Moore decided not to include the piece in the Pilot, only to finally give in and air it in this second season episode.); "TV Felons" - The show travels around Great Britain with "TV Cops" who bust British citizens that haven't paid for a license to watch television.; "Savings and Loan Scandal" - TV Nation outlines the history of the Savings and loan crisis, the charges, fines, convictions and outcomes for various financial institution executives (including Neil Bush, the son of then Vice President of the United States George H. W. Bush), and the overall financial impact on the United States. This segment only aired on BBC Two and did not air on Fox in the United States due to it being considered controversial by the network. It was later presented in 2003 as part of the screening series Antagonism Over the Airwaves: A Look at Controversy on Television and Radio, presented by the Museum of Television and Radio.; "Crackers -- Detroit" - Crackers investigates the strikes of the Detroit Free Press and the Detroit News, then attempts to stop the scab newspapers from being published.; "KGB4" - Yuri Shvets tries to find out what happened to the heart and soul of the Democratic Party in the United States.; "Weatherman" - After a weatherman is fired for refusing to lie and go ahead with his forecast of rain on the day of a Republican Party picnic, TV Nation hires him. This segment did not air on the BBC Two version of this episode, instead featuring in the subsequent episode.
17	8	"Fox Show 8"	45 minutes	only aired outside U.S.
Features the Health Care Olympics, the radio weatherman who lost his job for forecasting rain, and Rusty Cundieff looking at business philosophies. The show was produced for this second season on Fox, but never found an airdate on the network (or in the United States for that matter). This episode aired exclusively on BBC Two on 9 October 1995.

== Unaired segments ==
The release of TV Nation on two VHS volumes in 1997 offered a chance to view two unaired segments considered too controversial to be aired on broadcast television at the time. In the first segment at the end of Volume One, one of the correspondents visits drug stores and inquires about extra-small sized condoms. The second unaired segment at the end of Volume Two looks at the Phelps family, known for picketing the funerals of AIDS victims.
