= Cherkashin =

Cherkashin (masculine, Russian: Черкашин) or Cherkashina (feminine, Russian: Черкашина) is a Russian surname. Notable people with the surname include:

- Victor Cherkashin (born 1932), Soviet counter-intelligence officer
- Valera & Natasha Cherkashin, contemporary artists

== See also ==
- 5483 Cherkashin, a minor planet
