= TV Nation =

Satirical news magazine television series

- Title design by Chris Harvey
- Starring: Michael Moore; Rusty Cundieff; Karen Duffy; Janeane Garofalo; Louis Theroux
- Theme music composer: tomandandy
- Countries of origin: United States; United Kingdom
- No. of seasons: 2
- No. of episodes: 17 (list of episodes)

Production
- Producers: Kathleen Glynn; Jerry Kupfer
- Running time: 45 minutes
- Production companies: Dog Eat Dog Films; BBC; TriStar Television

Original release
- Network: NBC (season 1); Fox (season 2); BBC2
- Release: July 19, 1994 – September 8, 1995

TV Nation is a satirical news magazine television series written, co-produced, directed and hosted by Michael Moore that was co-funded and originally broadcast by NBC in the United States and BBC2 in the United Kingdom. The show blended humor and journalism into provocative reports about various issues. After moving to Fox for its second (and final) season, the show won an Emmy Award in 1995 for Outstanding Informational Series.

TV Nation was created in the wake of the success Moore had with the documentary Roger & Me, prompting Warner Bros. Television to ask Moore for television series ideas. In January 1993, NBC green-lit a pilot episode which took three months to complete. Interest from the BBC prompted NBC to insert the show into its summer 1994 lineup.

== Conception ==
After the success of the 1989 documentary Roger & Me, Michael Moore and producer Kathleen Glynn, then a married couple, were approached by Warner Bros. television about creating ideas for a television series. However, Moore was intent on making the full-length film Canadian Bacon after writing the script in the summer of 1991. After having his script passed on many times, it was on a visit to Hollywood in November 1992 about the movie that Moore received a phone call in his hotel room from NBC. Without a single TV show idea in mind, Moore agreed to meet with NBC executives about TV show ideas that afternoon. Frantic for ideas, Moore brainstormed over a carphone with producer Glynn on his half-hour drive to Burbank, out of which TV Nation spawned. As Moore and Glynn would later describe it, TV Nation "would be a humorous magazine show but with one distinct difference—it would have a point of view." Expecting the concept to be quickly dismissed by NBC executives during the meeting, Moore proceeded to describe the show in the most ludicrous ways possible, saying, "it would be a cross between 60 Minutes and Fidel Castro on laughing gas." Instead of quickly dismissing Moore's pitch, the NBC executives (including Warren Littlefield) were laughing. When Moore returned to his hotel, a message had already been left for him saying that production of a pilot episode had the go-ahead.

42% of Americans feel that Kato Kaelin should be a passenger on the next space shuttle, whether he wants to go or not.

— TV Nation poll conducted by Widgery & Associates

Production on the pilot episode of TV Nation began in January 1993. Moore initially turned to friends and colleagues in many production areas, while also making a point of ensuring the show's employees were unionized. For the show's title sequence, graphic designer Chris Harvey put together the images, and music group tomandandy wrote the TV Nation theme. After completing the pilot in three months, both NBC executives and focus groups were highly impressed with the show. But without room in their fall 1993 schedule, NBC indefinitely delayed committing to a full season. That winter, the head of BBC2 heard about the pilot, and after watching it offered to buy the show. With firm interest in the show, NBC offered to put TV Nation into its summer 1994 lineup.

== Episodes and format ==
Season one was originally broadcast in the United States on NBC in the summer of 1994, with the premiere airing July 19, 1994. After NBC canceled the show after one season, it was subsequently picked up by Fox, and the second season aired in the summer of 1995.

TV Nation is that rarest of species—a television program both funny and important.

— Robert Goldberg, The Wall Street Journal

TV Nation was formatted as a newsmagazine, with stories interspersed by short clips of the show's theme (for example, Moore spending a day with Dr. Jack Kevorkian) and factual polls surveying the American public. The show's investigative reports delved into various aspects of American life, and they were filmed and presented in a style similar to Moore's feature-length documentaries such as The Big One (1998).

The show featured segments such as "The Corporate Challenge," in which CEOs were challenged to prove they could use the products their companies created; the storming of the supposedly "private" beach in Greenwich, Connecticut; hiring ex-KGB officer Yuri Shvets to conduct investigations; an experiment to see if hiring a lobbyist for $5,000 could get the Congress to declare a "TV Nation Day" (he got a bill introduced, but it never passed); and "Crackers the Corporate Crime Fighting Chicken." Among its correspondents were Merrill Markoe, Janeane Garofalo, Karen Duffy, Jonathan Katz, Rusty Cundieff and Louis Theroux. Crackers was first portrayed by Lee Brownstein, but TV Nation writer John Derevlany played Crackers for the remainder of the show's run. TV Nation also featured humorous (but true) public opinion polls, each conducted by the firm of Widgery and Associates from a random sample of Americans.

=== Unaired segments ===
The release of TV Nation on two VHS volumes in 1997 offered a chance to view two unaired segments considered too controversial to be aired on broadcast television at the time. In the first segment at the end of Volume One, one of the correspondents visits drug stores and inquires about extra-small sized condoms. The second unaired segment at the end of Volume Two looks at the Phelps family, known for picketing the funerals of AIDS victims. Three additional segments were not allowed to air on American television, although all aired in United Kingdom: A segment on a support group formed for executives involved in the savings and loan crisis of the 1980s; an examination of the extreme anti-abortion movement; and re-enacting the 1992 Los Angeles riots using Civil War re-enactors.

== Awards and recognition ==
...be it Resolved, that August 16, 1994, shall be designated as "TV Nation Day."

— Bill HJ 365 IH, 103rd Congress, 2nd session

TV Nation won an Emmy Award for Outstanding Informational Series on September 8, 1995, and was later named number 90 on the list of the British Film Institute's 100 Greatest British Television Programmes. During its original broadcast run, TV Nation working with the well known Washington lobbyist William C. Chasey was recognized by the United States Congress in resolution H.J. 365, which declared August 16, 1994 as "TV Nation Day." The bill was introduced by Rep. Howard Coble, R, North Carolina, co-sponsored by Rep. Floyd H. Flake D, New York. TV Guide named TV Nation one of the ten best television shows of 1995.

== Cancellation and post-TV Nation ==
In December 1995, the Fox network decided not to pick up its option for more episodes of the show, despite receiving more letters and mail than they ever had for any show. By January 1997, the BBC had raised all of the necessary money for an eight-episode-long third season of TV Nation, receiving funds from TV networks in five different countries (Canada, Australia, New Zealand, South Africa and France). What prevented the third season from becoming a reality was a lack of a major American television network outlet for the show. During this time reruns of the show began appearing on Comedy Central, and ratings for the first week were, in Moore's words, "incredible."

After TV Nation ended, two VHS volumes of the show were released in 1997. Adventures in a TV Nation, a book about the series written by Moore and Glynn, was published in 1998. The funding previously acquired from British broadcaster Channel 4 for a third season eventually turned into the new TV series The Awful Truth. It was broadcast on the Bravo cable television network in the US from 1999 to 2000. There are currently no known reruns of TV Nation being shown by a United States TV station or cable channel, nor are there any plans to release it on DVD or to online video sites like Hulu.com.

== Home video releases ==
Two VHS video cassettes were released in 1997 by Columbia TriStar Home Video.

Title	Media type	Release date	Approximate length	ISBN
TV Nation—Volume 1	VHS videotape (NTSC)	November 4, 1997	120 minutes	ISBN 0-8001-9910-3
TV Nation—Volume 2	VHS videotape (NTSC)	November 4, 1997	120 minutes	ISBN 0-8001-9881-6

== Reboot ==
In 2019, TBS cancelled plans to reboot TV Nation. The series was originally greenlighted in 2017 with the title "Live from the Apocalypse" and developed for TNT.
