= John Helmer (journalist) =

Australian journalist

John Helmer (born 1946) is an Australian-born journalist and foreign correspondent based in Moscow, Russia since 1989. He has been described as the "longest-serving western correspondent in Moscow"... "specializing in the coverage of Russian business for media in London, New York, Hong Kong, Toronto, and Johannesburg".

== Biography ==
Born and raised in Australia, Helmer attended the University of Melbourne and was one the editors of the student magazine Farrago in the early 1960s. He graduated from Melbourne with honours bachelor's degree and then with an A.M. and Ph.D. in political science from Harvard University in the United States. In 1974 he was senior association at the Research Centre for Economic Planning in New York City. Until 1977 he was a senior lecturer in political science at the University of Melbourne and that year he was appointed as Associate Professor in the Department of Sociology at George Washington University. He was an advisor to the Jimmy Carter administration. In 2013 he was "visiting professor at the Department of Political Science, University of Melbourne". Helmer was based in Moscow since 1989 and, from there, worked for Australian Financial Review, The Australian and other newspapers. In 2012 he returned to Australia where he taught investigative journalism at the Centre for Advanced Journalism in the University of Melbourne.

He published several books on military and political topics, including essays on the American presidency and on urban policy in the US and essays on Greek, Mediterranean and Middle Eastern politics and foreign policy. Since 1989 he has published almost exclusively on Russian topics.

== Allegations ==
Yuri Shvets alleged Helmer was recruited by the KGB in the 1980s when he left to live in Russia permanently. Victor Cherkashin said that Helmer was unaware that Shvets was a KGB officer, and that Cherkashin himself called Shvets off. Later, after Shvets' concerns attracted controversy, Cherkashin confirmed that Helmer was not an agent.

Writing in the New Jersey Star Ledger, journalist Dave D'Alessandro described Helmer as, "the journalist residing in Moscow who has been a pebble in Mikhail Prokhorov’s shoe since oligarchs have been collecting their billions under the protection of a corrupt, Fascist state.... the kind of journalist who turns up dead once a month or so inside Putin's Russia." And also as, "a fascinating and talented fellow, if not a fair bit over the top in his pursuit of truths."

== Personal life ==
He was married to Australian journalist and foreign correspondent Claudia Wright who died in 2005. He was later married to Titiana (Tatiana). Vasilievna Turitsyna.

Helmer is the nephew of Zelman Cowen.

== Selected works ==
=== Books ===
- Urbanman : The Psychology of Urban Survival, New York: The Free Press, 1973 (joint editors: John Helmer and Neil A. Eddington)
- Urban Residential Street Study : Preliminary Report , South Melbourne: John Paterson Urban Systems, 1974
- Drug Use, the Labor Market and Class Conflict, Washington, DC: Drug Abuse Council, 1974
- The Deadly Simple Mechanics of Society, New York: Seabury Press, 1974 (Continuum Book series)
- Bringing the War Home : The American Soldier in Vietnam and After, New York: The Free Press, 1974
- Drugs and Minority Oppression, New York: Seabury Press, 1975 (Continuum Book series)
- The Man Who Knows Too Much About Russia, 2018
- The Lie That Shot Down MH17, 2020 (joint authors: Max van der Werff, Liane Theuerkauf and Sam Bullard)
- Sovcomplot: How Kremlin Pirates Tried to Capture the Treasure of the Russian Seas, and were Caught Out, 2020
- Skripal in Prison, Dancing Bear, 2020
- The Jackals' Wedding: American Power, Arab Revolt, 2022. Joint author: Claudia Wright.
- Dunce Upon A Time: Autobiography of Mistakes, 2023
- Long Live Novichok! The British Poison which Fooled the World, 2025
- Der Nawalny-Novitschok-Komplex: Chronik einer Inszenierung, Dannenberg: Der Politikchronist e.V., 2025

=== Articles ===
- "John Helmer: Support for Ukraine's Pro-war Parties Keeps Plunging", Kyiv Post, 19 September 2014
