= Norman Banks (broadcaster) =

Australian radio broadcaster (1905–1985)

MBE Norman Banks
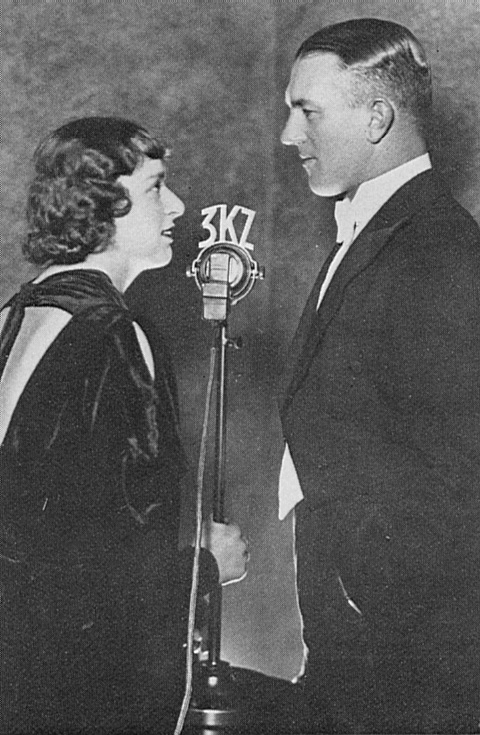
- Banks broadcasting on 3KZ in the 1930s
- Born: Norman Tyrell Banks; 12 October 1905; Sandringham, Victoria, Australia
- Died: 15 September 1985 (aged 79); Malvern, Victoria, Australia
- Education: St Aidan's Theological College, Ballarat; Ridley College (University of Melbourne)
- Occupation(s): Radio broadcaster, Television presenter
- Years active: 1931-1980s
- Known for: Early broadcaster of Australian rules football, establishing the annual Carols by Candlelight
- Awards: MBE for broadcasting Inductee Australian Football Hall of Fame; Melbourne Cricket Ground (in-gallery)

Norman Tyrell Banks MBE (12 October 1905 – 15 September 1985) was an Australian radio announcer, sports broadcaster, and television presenter. Banks was responsible for some of the first live broadcast reports of Australian Rules Football matches and founded the annual Melbourne Carols by Candlelight event. He later hosted conservative talk radio programs.

== Early life ==
Banks was born in Sandringham, Victoria, on 12 October 1905, the youngest of five children. His father, Charles Cecil Banks, died before he was born. His mother, Alice, worked as a draper to support the family after her husband's death.

Banks studied at St Aidan's Theological College, Ballarat and later at Ridley College, in Melbourne, intending to become an Anglican priest. However, at the age of 24, he decided to abandon his training and pursue a career outside the clergy, though he remained a member of the church throughout his life.

He worked as a car salesman for S.A. Cheney Motors and traveled to England and the United States as a company representative. After experiencing financial difficulties and returning to Australia, he worked on a farm in Colac owned by Joseph Gilmore before marrying Gilmore's daughter, Lorna May, at Christ Church on 6 May 1930.

== Early radio career ==
While in the United States, Banks developed an interest in the radio industry and gained some broadcasting experience. Soon after his marriage, Banks sought a position at 3KZ following the advice of his mother. He began his career as a radio announcer, and his broadcasts reportedly attracted competitive offers from other stations to recruit him. Over the next 20 years, Banks broadcast from Melbourne, including programs such as Voice of the Voyager, Voice of the People, Voice of the Business Girl, Voice of the Shopper, Husbands and Wives, Junior Information, Spelling Bee, Victoria Varieties, Myer Musicale, and "OBs" (outside broadcasts) of football, tennis, athletics, swimming, and other events.

Although not the first to broadcast the Victorian Football League (VFL) (Melbourne's 3AR broadcast former Carlton player Rod McGregor's descriptions of play at least as early as 1927), Banks was one of the early football radio broadcasters. Banks was not initially allowed to broadcast from the grounds but found ways of observing the games without being seen. In 1931 at Princes Park, Carlton, Banks broadcast his first football match while standing on a ladder at the end of the dressing room. On another occasion at Princes Park, he broadcast from a hardwood plank protruding from a ladies' toilet. At Lakeside Oval, he once broadcast from an 18-meter steel tower.

On Victory in Europe Day, 1945, Banks was assigned to report on the celebrations at the end of World War II. Despite having been recently injured in a car accident, he broadcast the victory celebrations from central Melbourne.

== Carols by Candlelight ==
On Christmas Eve 1937, Banks reportedly saw a woman listening to carols alone by the light of a candle. This image inspired him to organise a community event to help those lonely at Christmas. Banks staged the first Carols by Candlelight in 1938. On that first night, 10,000 people gathered at midnight in Alexandra Gardens to sing carols with a 30-strong choir, two soloists, and the Metropolitan Fire Brigade Band.

The event became an annual tradition and is now broadcast by 3AW on radio and Nine Network on television as a fundraiser for Vision Australia.

== Move to 3AW ==
Banks applied to 3KZ management in 1952 for leave to attend the Helsinki Olympics. Banks stated to the station manager that he would resign if not permitted to go. His resignation was accepted immediately.

Within days, he had signed with rival station 3AW and was able to attend the Helsinki Olympic Games, publishing his notes as The World in My diary; from Melbourne to Helsinki for the Olympic Games in 1953.

At 3AW, he covered the Olympics, football, current affairs, and outside broadcasts around Melbourne, as well as hosting in-studio programs. He served as the station's news editor for a period. He worked at 3AW until 1978, a career spanning 26 years.

Banks was known on the radio in the 1960s and 1970s for expressing his conservative opinions, including defenses of apartheid in South Africa and the monarchy. These views were often presented in on-air debates with journalist Claudia Wright or broadcaster Ormsby Wilkins, who called him "a sanctimonious old hypocrite".

An accident at a football event, followed by another in the 3AW corridors, severely impaired his vision. His final on-air words were "the humble people, the little people… for your trust, loyalty, and support."

== Honors ==
In 1953, Banks was appointed an MBE for his services to broadcasting.

He was inducted into the Melbourne Cricket Ground's Rogues Gallery in 1998, with his citation reading—

An original football caller with 3KZ in 1931, he later moved to 3AW, combining sport and current affairs. (He) Called football for three decades. (He) Covered Helsinki and Melbourne Olympics.

In 1996, Banks was an inaugural inductee into the Australian Football Hall of Fame in the Media category. His citation read—

A pioneer of football broadcasts on 3AW and 3KZ. In 1931, (he) broadcast his first match from Princes Park, standing on a ladder at the end of the dressing rooms. (His) Broadcasting career spanned 60 years.
