= Louis Theroux =

British and American journalist and author (born 1970)

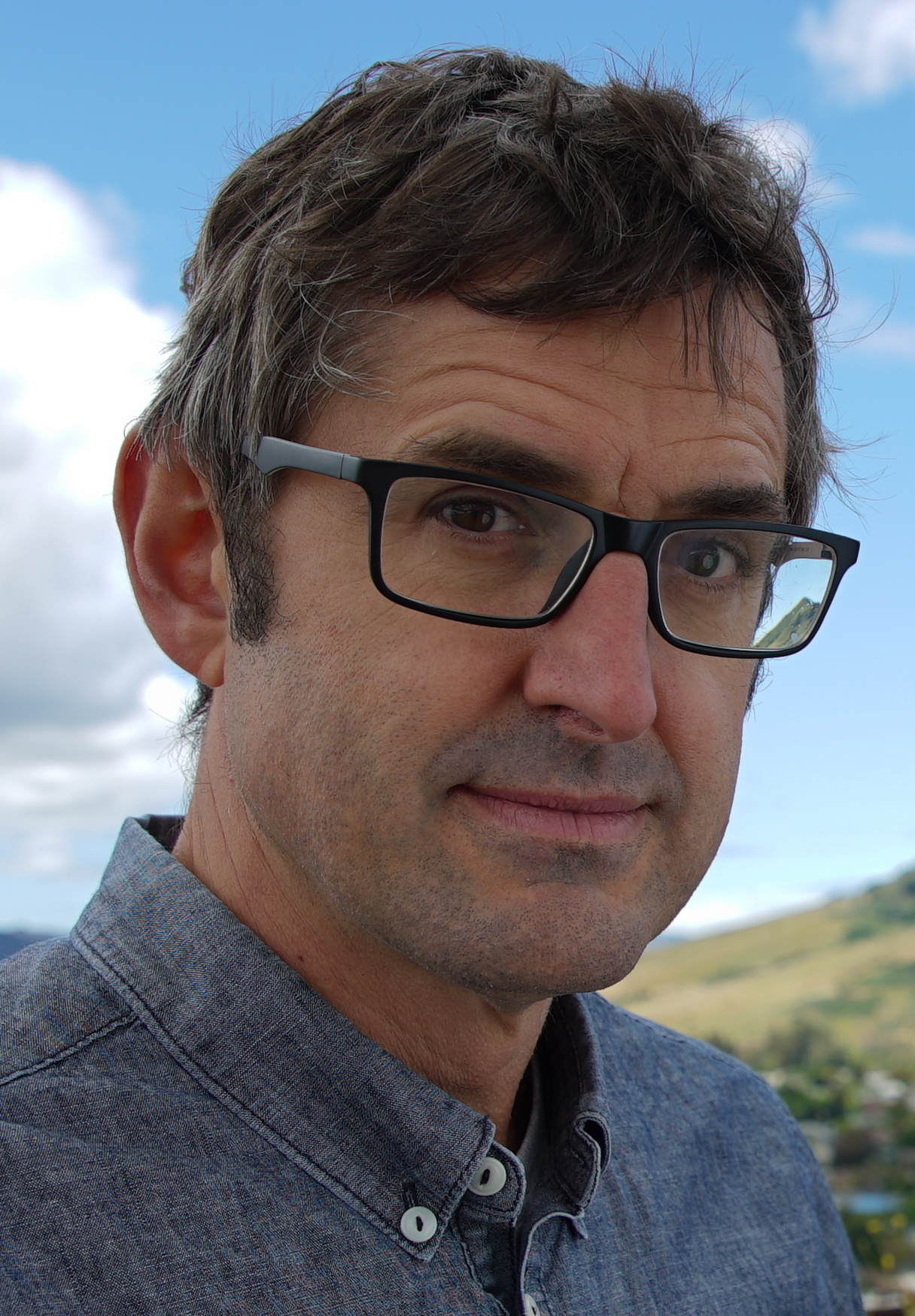
- Theroux in 2018
- Born: 20 May 1970 (age 56); Singapore
- Citizenship: United Kingdom; United States
- Education: Magdalen College, Oxford
- Occupations: Documentarian; journalist; broadcaster; author
- Years active: 1992–present
- Spouses: Susanna Kleeman (m. 1998; div. 2001); Nancy Strang (m. 2012)
- Children: 3
- Father: Paul Theroux
- Relatives: Marcel Theroux (brother); Justin Theroux (cousin); Alexander Theroux (uncle); Peter Theroux (uncle)
- Website: louistheroux.com

Louis Theroux (/ˈlu.i θə.ˈru/ LOO-ee thə-ROO; born 20 May 1970) is a British and American journalist, broadcaster, documentarian and author. He has received three British Academy Television Awards and a Royal Television Society Television Award.

After graduating from Magdalen College, Oxford, Theroux moved to the United States and worked as a journalist for Metro Silicon Valley and Spy. He moved into television as the presenter of offbeat segments on Michael Moore's TV Nation series.

Theroux is known for his numerous documentaries with the BBC, beginning with Louis Theroux's Weird Weekends (1998–2000), followed by When Louis Met... (2000–2002) and 50 BBC Two specials (2003–present). His work includes studies of unusual and taboo subcultures, crime and the justice system, and celebrities. The majority of his documentaries are set in the United States, but he has also studied cultures in South Africa, Israel, Nigeria, and the UK. The New Yorker described Theroux's work as "a piercingly humane, slyly funny guide through the funkier passages of American culture".

== Early life ==
Theroux was born in Singapore on 20 May 1970; he is the son of English mother Anne (née Castle) and American father Paul Theroux, a noted travel writer and novelist. His paternal grandmother, Anne Dittami, was an Italian-American grammar school teacher, while his paternal grandfather, Albert Eugène Theroux, was a French-Canadian salesman for the American Leather Oak company. Theroux holds dual British and American citizenship. He is the nephew of novelist Alexander Theroux and writer Peter Theroux. His older brother, Marcel, is a writer and television presenter. His cousin, Justin, is an actor and screenwriter.

Theroux moved with his family to England when he was one year old; he was raised in the Catford and Wandsworth districts of south London. He went from primary school to Tower House School in East Sheen in 1979 or 1980 and then to Westminster School, a public school within the precincts of Westminster Abbey. There, he befriended the future comedians Adam Buxton and Joe Cornish, and the future Liberal Democrat leader and deputy prime minister Nick Clegg, with whom he travelled to America. He also performed in a number of school theatre productions including Bugsy Malone as Looney Bergonzi, Ritual for Dolls as the Army Officer, and The Splendour Falls as the Minstrel. He read Modern History at Magdalen College, Oxford (1988–1991), graduating with first-class honours.

== Career ==
=== Early career ===
Theroux's first employment as a journalist was in the United States with Metro Silicon Valley, an alternative free weekly newspaper in San Jose, California. In 1992, he was hired as a writer for the satirical monthly magazine Spy. He also worked as a correspondent on Michael Moore's TV Nation series, for which he provided segments on offbeat cultural subjects, including selling Avon to women in the Amazon rainforest, the Jerusalem syndrome, and attempts by the Ku Klux Klan to rebrand itself as a civil rights group for white people.

When TV Nation ended, Theroux signed a development deal with the BBC, where he developed Louis Theroux's Weird Weekends. He has written for a number of publications, including Hip Hop Connection and The Idler.

=== Documentaries ===
==== Louis Theroux's Weird Weekends ====
In Weird Weekends (1998–2000), Theroux followed marginal (mostly American) subcultures such as survivalists, black nationalists, white supremacists, and porn stars, often by living among or close to the people who were involved in them. His documentary method subtly exposes the contradictions or farcical elements of his subjects' seriously held beliefs. He described the aim of Weird Weekends as:

Setting out to discover the genuinely odd in the most ordinary setting. To me, it's almost a privilege to be welcomed into these communities and to shine a light on them and, maybe, through my enthusiasm, to get people to reveal more of themselves than they may have intended. The show is laughing at me, adrift in their world, as much as at them. I don't have to play up that stuff. I'm not a matinee idol disguised as a nerd.

==== When Louis Met... ====
In the series When Louis Met... (2000–02), Theroux accompanied a different British celebrity in each programme in their daily lives, interviewing them as they go. His episode about British entertainer Jimmy Savile, entitled When Louis Met Jimmy, was voted one of the top documentaries of all time in a 2005 survey by Britain's Channel 4. Some years after the episode was filmed, the NSPCC described Savile as "one of the most prolific sex offenders" in Great Britain.

In an interview in 2015, Theroux expressed his intention to produce a follow-up documentary about Savile for the BBC to explore how the late entertainer had continued his abuse for so long, to meet people he knew closely, and examine his own reflections on his inability to dig more deeply into the first case. This follow-up documentary, titled Savile, aired on BBC Two on Sunday, 2 October 2016, and lasted 1 hour and 15 minutes.

In When Louis Met the Hamiltons, the former Conservative MP Neil Hamilton and his wife Christine were arrested during the course of filming, due to false allegations of indecent assault.

In When Louis Met Max Clifford, Max Clifford tried to set up Theroux, but he was caught lying as the crew recorded his live microphone during the conversations.

After this series concluded, a retrospective called Life with Louis was released. Theroux made a documentary called Louis, Martin & Michael about his quest to get an interview with Michael Jackson in which he lost out to Martin Bashir, who went on to make the documentary Living with Michael Jackson. Selected episodes of When Louis Met... were included as bonus content on a Best-Of collection of Weird Weekends.

==== BBC Two specials ====
In these special programmes, beginning in 2003, Theroux returned to American themes, working at feature-length and in a more natural way. In March 2006, he signed a new deal with the BBC to make ten films over the course of three years. Subjects for the specials included criminal gangs in Lagos, Neo-Nazis in America, ultra-Zionists in Israel. He also explored child psychiatry and the prison systems in California and Florida. A 2007 special, The Most Hated Family in America, received strong critical praise from the international media.

==== My Scientology Movie ====
In October 2016, Theroux premiered a feature-length documentary, My Scientology Movie. Produced by Simon Chinn—a school friend of Theroux's—and directed by John Dower, the film covered Theroux attempting to gain access to the secretive Church of Scientology. It premiered at the London Film Festival in 2015 and was released in cinemas in the UK on 7 October 2016.

==== Forbidden America (2022) ====
Forbidden America is a three-part series focusing on social media use in the United States among several groups, including the alt-right, rappers and pornographic film actors. On the Extreme and Online, Theroux met the latest incarnation of the American far right: a political movement born out of the internet and increasingly making its presence felt on the political stage. Theroux interviewed Nick Fuentes and Baked Alaska.

==== Interviews ====
In 2022, the BBC announced a series of interviews conducted by Theroux under the title Louis Theroux Interviews, in which he meets and talks to celebrities from stage, screen and music about their successful careers and their personal lives. The first series started airing weekly on BBC Two on 25 October 2022 and featured interviews from rapper Stormzy, actress Dame Judi Dench, musician YUNGBLUD, adventurer Bear Grylls, comedian Katherine Ryan and singer Rita Ora. The second series of Louis Theroux Interviews started airing on 7 November 2023 and included interviews from boxer Anthony Joshua, musician Pete Doherty, actress Joan Collins, singer Raye, activist Chelsea Manning and actor Ashley Walters.

==== The Settlers (2025) ====
Theroux spent time with the growing community of Israeli religious-nationalist settlers. Their settlements are illegal under international law, but they have been protected by the army, police, and government of Israel. Since the start of the Gaza war, there has been an acceleration in the establishment of settlements. The documentary explored the lives of both prominent settlers and Palestinian activists.

==== Louis Theroux: Inside the Manosphere (2026) ====
Directed by Adrian Choa and presented by Louis Theroux, Inside the Manosphere is a 2026 feature-length documentary. Released globally on Netflix on 11 March 2026, the project marked Theroux's debut as a presenter for the streaming platform, following a decades-long career primarily associated with the BBC. The documentary explored the "manosphere", an online ecosystem of content creators advocating for hyper-masculinity, "red-pill" philosophy and often controversial views on gender roles.

=== Producer ===
In 2024, his production company Mindhouse produced a documentary on Netflix about a prolific cyber stalker titled Can I Tell You a Secret?

=== Books ===
Theroux published his first book, The Call of the Weird: Travels in American Subcultures, in Britain in 2005. In it, he recounted his return to the United States to learn about the lives of some of the people he had featured in his television programmes.

Theroux released a memoir, Gotta Get Theroux This, in September 2019. He released his third book, Theroux the Keyhole, a diary recorded during the UK COVID-19 lockdowns, in November 2021.

=== Podcasts ===
In April 2020, during a COVID-19 lockdown, Theroux started the BBC Radio 4 podcast Grounded with Louis Theroux from his home, in which he interviewed well-known people he finds particularly fascinating and to whom he would not necessarily have had a chance to speak before the COVID-19 pandemic.

Beginning on 6 June 2023, he started hosting The Louis Theroux Podcast as part of an exclusive deal with Spotify.

=== Other appearances ===
Theroux made a few appearances on The Adam and Joe Show and has been a guest many times on Adam & Joe's radio shows, as well as on The Adam Buxton Podcast.

As part of the Weird Weekends episode "Porn", Theroux agreed to film a cameo in the 1997 gay pornography film Take a Peak. He did not perform sexual acts in the film, but made a brief appearance as a park ranger in search of a criminal. In the Weird Weekends episode "Infomercials", he featured as a live salesman for an at-home paper shredder for the Home Shopping Network.

In December 2015, Theroux captained the team representing Magdalen College, Oxford on BBC Four's Christmas University Challenge. In their first-round match, the team beat the University of Exeter's team by 220 to 130 and went on to win the tournament.

In April 2022, Theroux went viral after a clip of him on the YouTube show Chicken Shop Date—in which he performed a short rap he had originally written and performed in the Weird Weekends episode "Gangsta Rap" 22 years earlier—was autotuned by a TikTok user and turned into a reusable audio track with backing music. The trend saw users lip-syncing to the sound and performing an accompanying dance. It has led to more footage of Theroux's rapping ability being unearthed, leading the BBC to publish an article listing seven times he "proved he was a massive hip hop head". In May, Theroux released "Jiggle Jiggle", a full version of the rap which he created alongside Manchester DJ duo Duke & Jones which sold over 500,000 copies in the US, making it a gold certified single.

== Personal life ==
Theroux's first marriage was to Susanna Kleeman until they divorced in 2002. He later told Sathnam Sanghera of the Financial Times, "What happened was that my girlfriend was living with me in New York. She was having trouble finding work ... legally. So we got married, to make it easier for her. We never really considered ourselves married in the full sense – there were no wedding photos or anything like that. It was really a marriage of convenience."

Theroux married his long-time girlfriend, Nancy Strang, on 13 July 2012. They have three sons together. In a 2012 masterclass, he spoke of the challenges of combining family life with the need to work on projects. They lived in the Harlesden area of London until temporarily moving to Los Angeles in early 2013, allowing him more time to focus on his LA Stories series. In 2017, they relocated to Los Angeles. Theroux and his family spent COVID-19 lockdowns at their home in North-West London.

Theroux is an atheist. He dabbled with cannabis at 17, and through his 20s and early 30s used it regularly to help him sleep. He later said that, while he acknowledges that cannabis is an intoxicant and can trigger certain mental health issues, he supports its legalisation. He has also revealed that he has a fear of flying. In 2023, he announced that he has alopecia that has caused facial hair loss.

In 2018, Theroux's Twitter account was hacked by cybersecurity firm Insinia as part of their attempt to highlight a longstanding security flaw in Twitter's system.

Theroux is a supporter of West London football club Queens Park Rangers.

== Awards ==
=== British Academy Television Awards ===
| | Category | Show | Result |
|---|---|---|---|
| 2001 | Richard Dimbleby Award for the Best Presenter (Factual, Features and News) | Louis Theroux's Weird Weekends | Won |
| 2002 | Richard Dimbleby Award for the Best Presenter (Factual, Features and News) | When Louis Met... | Won |
| 2002 | Flaherty Documentary Award (TV) | When Louis Met... The Hamiltons | Nominated |

=== Emmy Awards ===
| Year | Category | Show | Result |
|---|---|---|---|
| 1995 | Outstanding Informational Series | TV Nation | Nominated |

=== Royal Television Society Television Awards ===
| Year | Category | Show | Result |
|---|---|---|---|
| 2002 | Best Presenter | When Louis Met... | Nominated |
| 2010 | Best Presenter | A Place for Paedophiles | Won |

== See also ==
- List of TV Nation episodes
- List of Louis Theroux documentaries
