= The Awful Truth (TV series) =

Satirical television show by Michael Moore

- Directed by: Tom Gianas
- Starring: Michael Moore
- Countries of origin: United Kingdom; United States
- Original language: English
- No. of seasons: 2
- No. of episodes: 24

Production
- Running time: 30 minutes
- Production companies: Dog Eat Dog Films; Channel 4 Salter Street Films

Original release
- Network: Bravo; UK Channel 4
- Release: 11 April 1999 – 5 July 2000

Related
- TV Nation

The Awful Truth (1999–2000) is a satirical television show that was directed, written, and hosted by filmmaker Michael Moore, and funded by the British broadcaster Channel 4.

== Background ==
The show emulated television newsmagazine shows (such as 60 Minutes, or Moore's own previous show, TV Nation) in that it comprised a series of documentary segments. For the first season the format involved presenting them to a studio audience (the second season moved to Times Square), often accompanied by a coda and commentary by Moore as to what happened after the segment was first filmed. The show focused on exposing problems in American government, business, and society. It often used outlandish sketches and stunts to point out the inherent absurdity of a situation and hint at potential solutions. At times, the show's sometimes humiliating tactics drew enough attention to cause corporations involved to rethink their policies. For example, after initially denying a man coverage for a pancreas transplant, Humana agreed to pay for it.

== Episodes ==
Series	Episodes	Originally released	
Series	Episodes	First released	Last released
1	12	11 April 1999	27 June 1999
2	12	17 May 2000	9 August 2000

=== Season 1 (1999) ===
No.	Title	Segments	Original release date
1	"Episode 1"	"A Cheaper Way to Conduct a Witch Hunt" and "Funeral at an HMO"	11 April 1999
2	"Episode 2"	"Beat the Rich" and "The Sodomobile"	18 April 1999
3	"Episode 3"	"Crackers vs. Mickey Mouse" and "The Voice-Box Choir"	25 April 1999
4	"Episode 4"	"Sal, The Bill Collector" and "Duck and Cover"	2 May 1999
5	"Episode 5"	"The Awful Truth Man of the Year", "TV Pundits?", and "150 Feet from NBC"	9 May 1999
6	"Episode 6"	"Work Care!", "LucyCam", and "Air-Drop TVs on Afghanistan"	16 May 1999
7	"Episode 7"	"William Sebastian Cohen", "LucyCam #2", and "Manpower"	23 May 1999
8	"Episode 8"	"Montana Shacks", "Joe Camel Gets a Job", and "LucyCam #3"	30 May 1999
9	"Episode 9"	"Turdonia", "Teen Sniper School", and "Hitler Goes Banking"	6 June 1999
10	"Episode 10"	"Crackers Goes to Buckeye Eggs", "The Michael Moore Playset", "American Apartheid", and "Bill Gates' Housewarming"	13 June 1999
11	"Episode 11"	"Weapon Inspectors", "The Make a Wish Foundation", and "We Find Hillary a Date"	20 June 1999
12	"Episode 12"	"NAFTA Mike", "Strikebreakers", and "Mergers"	27 June 1999

=== Season 2 (2000) ===
No. overall	No. in series	Title	Segments	Original release date
13	1	"Advertiser Appreciation Night"	"Presidential Mosh" and "Gun Crazy"	17 May 2000
14	2	"Compassionate Conservative Night"	"Don't Shoot, It's Only a Wallet" and "Sibling Rivalry"	24 May 2000
15	3	"Help the Dead Guy"	"Immoral Majority" and "Seniors Strike Back"	31 May 2000
16	4	"German Vacation Night"	"Got it Maid!" and "BMW (Break My Windows)"	7 June 2000
17	5	"Ficus for Congress"	"Campaign" and "Election Day"	21 June 2000
18	6	"Taxi Driver"	"Whitey Can't Ride", "Low Heels for Ho Heels", and "Male Apartheid"	28 June 2000
19	7	"Dixie Flag Night"	"Corporate Cops" and "Molson Loses Its Head"	5 July 2000
20	8	"Stop and Frisk Night"	"No Trials Necessary" and "No Intelligence Necessary"	12 July 2000
21	9	"Replacement Mike"	"No Side Effects" and "We Still Love NY"	19 July 2000
22	10	"Store the Homeless"	"Design For Living", "Thou Shalt Not...", and "Affirmative Action"	26 July 2000
23	11	"Gulf War"	"Saddamized" and "It's All in Your Head"	2 August 2000
24	12	"Find Clinton a Job"	"Roe v. Wade, R.I.P." and "Population Explosion"	9 August 2000

== Notable scenes ==
- After legislation to display the Ten Commandments in public schools, Moore interviews the bill's co-signers and asks them what the eighth commandment is; most cannot answer the question correctly. Dave Weldon does suggest "thou shalt not steal," which is correct for most Protestants, but Michael was using the Roman Catholic/Lutheran list, as he is Catholic. (Moore was looking for "thou shalt not bear false witness against thy neighbor".)
- Moore creates an "African American Wallet Exchange" in Harlem, in response to four NYPD officers who fired on and killed Amadou Diallo, because they thought his wallet was a gun. Once all the wallets are exchanged, Moore deposited them in front of the NYPD headquarters.
- Staging a mock funeral outside of Humana's corporate headquarters when a health care policyholder is denied a claim to fund a potentially life-saving pancreas transplant. This segment became the inspiration for Moore's sixth feature film, Sicko, released by The Weinstein Company on 29 June 2007. Moore's original plan for Sicko was to stage ten 'stunts' like the mock funeral in front of health-care agencies, but eventually decided to scrap the idea.
- A group clad in Colonial clothing behaving in a manner reminiscent of the Salem Witch Trials in protest of Kenneth Starr, and his tactics during President Bill Clinton's impeachment trial, with the idea that colonials know how to conduct an economical witch trial. They also read parts of Starr's report on Clinton while Starr was head of the Office of the Independent Counsel, and also highlight certain high-profile politicians own 'anti-moralistic' behavior (in particular Newt Gingrich's affair and subsequent divorce).
- Crackers the Corporate Crime Fighting Chicken (a character first introduced in TV Nation), played by producer Gideon Evans traveling to Disney World to confront Mickey Mouse about unfair labor practices.
- The Iowa Caucuses Mosh Pit, in which Alan Keyes dived onto a portable mosh pit and crowd-surfed to Rage Against the Machine to win the endorsement of The Awful Truth for the 2000 presidential election.
- The Sodomobile, a pink van loaded with homosexual men and women, traveling across the country to U.S. states that have on-the-books sodomy laws, to fight for gay rights. At one point they encounter Pastor Fred Phelps, infamous for picketing during funerals of homosexual men.
- An election special where a Ficus tree was run against the otherwise unopposed Republican incumbent Rodney Frelinghuysen for a seat in Congress. In total 23 plants ran as write-in candidates for House seats. The Ficus write-in votes were later refused to be counted by the election committee, but the ones that were, showed the Ficus having a 4-1 lead over Frelinghuysen.
- A visit to Philip Morris (now Altria) headquarters, where a group of lung and throat cancer victims used their electronic voice boxes to sing Christmas tunes.

== Release ==
The first season of the series was filmed in Chicago, Illinois, and aired on the Bravo cable network in the US and on Channel 4 in the UK. The second season was filmed in New York City. Both seasons were released on DVD on April 29, 2003.

Season one had 12 episodes and premiered 11 April 1999 ending 27 June 1999. Season two had 12 episodes, and premiered 17 May 2000 and ended 5 July 2000.

== See also ==
- TV Nation
- Da Ali G Show
- The Revolution Will Be Televised
