= Grounded with Louis Theroux =

BBC Radio 4 podcast series

- Genre: Interview; discussion

Cast and voices
- Hosted by: Louis Theroux

Production
- Production: Mindhouse Productions
- Length: ~60 minutes

Publication
- No. of episodes: 21
- Original release: 2020
- Provider: BBC Sounds; BBC Radio 4

Reception
- Ratings: 4.5/5

Related
- Website: www.bbc.co.uk/programmes/p089sfrz

Grounded with Louis Theroux is a radio and video podcast series hosted by Louis Theroux for BBC Radio 4. In each episode, Theroux interviews a different high-profile person whom he has always wanted to talk to. The show was first broadcast during the 2020 COVID-19 lockdown and became the most popular podcast on the BBC Sounds app during this time.

== Overview ==
Grounded with Louis Theroux is the first podcast series from Theroux. It was first broadcast in April 2020 during the COVID-19 UK lockdown when Theroux could no longer continue with his TV projects and wanted to remain productive. The guests consist of people he had always wanted to talk to, including some who had turned down being interviewed as part of the When Louis Met... series.

The name Grounded is inspired by the COVID-19 lockdown measures that were imposed across the globe. The interviews take place over Zoom with Theroux hosting from his home office, and often feature Theroux experiencing difficulties with the technology.

The podcast episodes last for around an hour, but unedited interviews have lasted up to two and a half hours.

=== Style ===
Theroux was introduced to podcasting in 2013 when listening to, and later appearing on, the interview show WTF with Marc Maron. He also experienced the impact of podcasts after appearing on The Adam Buxton Podcast, describing the medium as being like an "odd space that's somewhere between private and public." Theroux claimed that because the interviews for Grounded took place during the pandemic and lockdown, there was "a background of a shared feeling of confusion and grief" that made guests willing to speak more candidly about difficulties in their life and the audience connect with the material. Theroux stated that he made an effort to keep the conversations reciprocal and often opened up to the guests with his own struggles.

Theroux compared the podcast to his work on TV, stating that podcast conversations were a more controllable format than his documentary interactions. He described his role in the podcast as “a bit more of a tour guide" who guided the conversation "as opposed to a therapist inquisitor".

== Production ==
Grounded was the first commission for the production company Mindhouse Productions, which was founded in 2019 by Theroux, his wife Nancy Strang, and Aaron Fellow. The podcast was part of a large investment of millions of pounds in original material for the BBC Sounds app. Episodes were made available via the app before being broadcast on BBC Radio 4 the following week. The show was the biggest hit for the app during the COVID-19 UK lockdown between April–June 2020.

== Episodes ==
=== Series 1 ===
Episode no.	Guest	Original podcast release date
1	Jon Ronson	27 April 2020
In the first episode of the series, Theroux interviews journalist, documentarian and professional rival Jon Ronson. Ronson shares how his anxiety has mentally equipped him for a pandemic, saying "I've been preparing for this my whole life." They also talk about Ronson's documentaries with Omar Bakri Muhammad and Alex Jones, and Theroux's documentaries featuring Neo-Nazis and Joe Exotic.
2	Boy George	4 May 2020
Theroux speaks to musician Boy George and admits to being a fan of both him and his band Culture Club in the '80s. Boy George speaks about the "thrilling and exhilarating and overwhelming" experience of Culture Club topping the charts, the abuse he faced in his youth due to his sexuality, his personal style, and being a recovering addict.
3	Helena Bonham Carter	11 May 2020
Theroux and Bonham Carter talk about how they both attended Westminster School at the same time. Bonham Carter speaks about her roles in The Crown, Fight Club, Planet of the Apes, Sweeney Todd, and Alice in Wonderland. She also touches on coping with fame and her relationship with ex-husband Tim Burton.
4	Lenny Henry	18 May 2020
Henry and Theroux discuss Henry's childhood, family, and autobiography Who Am I, Again?. They talk about past and present racism in the UK including Henry's experiences of being rejected by girls at dances because of his race, and his conflict at appearing in The Black and White Minstrel Show. Fiona Sturges of The Financial Times praised this "wide-ranging and emotional" episode, saying "This is how the celebrity interview is done."
5	Rose McGowan	25 May 2020
McGowan talks about her childhood in the cult The Children of God, running away from home aged 13, her acting career, and her crucial role in the Me Too movement. She describes the abuse she faced from disgraced film producer Harvey Weinstein. Theroux compares the failure of people to recognise Harvey Weinstein as a criminal to how he himself failed to notice Jimmy Savile was a paedophile whilst filming When Louis Met.... Theroux describes a sense of guilt for failing to get to the truth, to which McGowan replies "Well, you did."
6	KSI	1 June 2020
YouTuber and rapper KSI talks to Theroux about his time at school, his career success, and his boxing matches with Joe Weller and Logan Paul. KSI revealed how he learnt the value of his YouTube channel after speaking about the money he made to a teacher at school. Theroux also asks about family rifts caused by KSI's career but KSI does not delve into the topic, prompting Theroux to suggest he has gained a level of maturity about his personal and private life.
7	Miriam Margolyes	8 June 2020
Margolyes and Theroux talk about her struggle with lockdown, her long-distance relationship, sex, and her career. She discusses the value of being "shocking" but not rude. She also talks about antisemitism in England, calling it "troubling and disgusting".
8	Troy Deeney	15 June 2020
Deeney talks about his childhood, his time in prison, and professional football. Theroux questions why there are no openly gay male footballers playing now, and Deeney discusses how he thinks footballers are put on a pedestal but are often unfairly criticised for their high earnings.
9	Gail Porter	22 June 2020
At the start of the episode, Porter talks about her father's death and how she thinks she had COVID-19 after returning from Spain, but could not get a test. She and Theroux also discuss her mental health, being sectioned, her relationship with the late Keith Flint, and her personal documentary Being Gail Porter. She talks about her struggle with anorexia and depression, and says that she thinks people are becoming increasingly open about mental health. They also discuss her career, including a show she filmed in the United States about ghosts.
10	Chris O'Dowd	29 June 2020
In the final episode of the series, Theroux and O'Dowd discuss family life and work during lockdown, acting, and O'Dowd's sitcom Moone Boy. Theroux question's O'Dowd's participation in the widely criticised celebrity rendition of John Lennon's Imagine, orchestrated by Gal Gadot and released during lockdown. O'Dowd claims he did not know what it was for and admits that the video's backlash "was justified". He also reveals that in past auditions he would sometimes pretend he had been bitten by a dog to "make an impression".

=== Series 2 ===
The release of Series 2 of Grounded was announced in November 2020. Whilst promoting the series, Theroux stated "many of us are back in lockdown… but the good news is it’s been timed perfectly to coincide with the release of Grounded season two".

Episode no.	Guest	Original podcast release date
11	Michaela Coel	30 November 2020
Coel and Theroux talk about Coel's critically acclaimed drama I May Destroy You. She reveals that she was concerned that the intense story about sexual abuse would be poorly received in 2020, but is suffering from "post-writum depression" now that the show is over. They talk about sexual consent, Theroux's documentaries, and how Coel became a Christian at 18 but subsequently lost her faith.
12	Sia	7 December 2020
Sia talks about her music, career, and her struggles with addiction. She mentions that she is working through complex PTSD related to experiences in her childhood. Theroux and Sia also talk about her film Music and the experiences of people with autism. Sia mentions how she does not enjoy performing but fan appreciation has changed her view of it, particularly referencing how she was told that her music saved the life a child on the autism spectrum.
13	Rylan Clark-Neal	14 December 2020
Clark-Neal discusses his time on Celebrity Big Brother and The X Factor. He talks about his experience with fame, including how Katie Price inspired him to create a stage name (his real name is Ross), his struggle after winning Big Brother, and how despite wanting to be famous as a child he does not fully enjoy it. He also talks about his childhood and his sexuality, joking that Theroux's 1998 Weird Weekends episode Porn may have helped Clark-Neal realise he was gay.
14	Ruby Wax	21 December 2020
Wax talks about how she saw Theroux as a professional rival for a long time, but acknowledges her dislike for him was driven by her personal projections of "jealousy, envy, failure, my dad's disapproval". She discusses her career as an interviewer and documentarian, including her interview with Donald Trump, living with Hugh Hefner, and being made a Ku Klux Klan wizard. Wax also talks about her childhood and her mental health.
15	Frankie Boyle	28 December 2020
Boyle discusses comedy and the media, referencing jokes he has made in the past which resulted in negative reactions from newspapers and TV and claiming he was "cancelled before it was cool". He also mentions how he successfully sued The Daily Mirror in 2011 after the paper accused him being racist, and donated the £54,650 in damages to charity. He and Theroux talk about Boyle's childhood, his autobiography My Shit Life So Far, their past drinking excessive drinking, and Boyle's fear of flying. Boyle also criticises fellow comedian Ricky Gervais for his "lazy" transgender joke. After recording this episode, Theroux admitted he had spoken into the wrong end of the microphone.
16	Oliver Stone	4 January 2021
Stone talks about the creation of his films Platoon, Born on the Fourth of July, and Scarface. He speaks about his time serving in the Vietnam War and subsequently suffering from PTSD. He also talk about his brief time joining Scientology, his cocaine addiction, and his criticisms of George W. Bush.
17	Riz Ahmed	11 January 2021
This episode is the first time Ahmed publicly announced his marriage. He discusses his career in indie films such as Nightcrawler and Four Lions, and his how childhood experiences of "code-switching" between different environments made him a good actor. He talks about his time at Oxford University where he felt he did not belong but enjoyed the experience. Ahmed also discussed his role in Sound of Metal for which he learned how to drum and communicate in sign language, saying "I was looking for something to sink my teeth into".
18	Leah Remini	18 January 2021
Remini talks about her time as a Scientologist, beginning at the age of nine and ending in 2013. Upon leaving the Church, she says she has been labelled a Suppressive Person meaning current members of the Church cannot interact with her. She mentions how whilst in the Church she reached Operating Thetan Level 5 but donated $400,000 to get there. Remini also talks about her relationship with Tom Cruise within the Church as part of his core group of seven celebrities. The Church of Scientology has denied the claims made in this podcast episode, stating "the claims cannot be substantiated, since nothing that is alluded to ever happened".
19	FKA twigs	25 January 2021
FKA twigs talks about her abusive relationship with actor Shia LaBeouf. She states that she wants to speak out about the abuse because "it is something in society that's a really big problem ... but for some reason, we don't talk about it". She talks about how wants to raise awareness about recovery from abuse and to tackle victim-blaming of survivors. FKA twigs also discusses how she has experienced racism since being a child and faced a large amount of abuse whilst in a relationship with actor Robert Pattinson. She and Theroux talk about FKA twigs's album Magdalene, her musical inspirations, and how she has learnt pole dancing and Wushu during lockdown. Miranda Sawyer of The Guardian called this episode of Grounded "an important listen".
20	Justin Theroux	1 February 2021
In the final episode of the series, Louis Theroux talks to actor, writer and director Justin Theroux, who is also his cousin. The two talk about their childhood together and disagree over the pronunciation of their surname. Justin Theroux talks about working with David Lynch, Ben Stiller and Jimmy Kimmel.
21 (Bonus episode)	Gail Porter, Honey Porter, Ruby Wax, KSI, Chris O'Dowd, Michaela Coel, Frankie Boyle, Rylan Clark-Neal, FKA twigs, Jon Ronson, Justin Theroux	8 February 2021
In this bonus episode, Theroux answers questions about himself posed by past guests of the podcast.

== Reception ==
Grounded with Louis Theroux was the most listened-to new podcast on Apple Podcasts in 2020. As of May 2021, the podcast has received over 7,500 ratings on Apple Podcasts with an average score of 4.7 out of 5. It won Podcast of the Year in the Heat Unmissables Awards 2020.

James Marriott of The Times gave the podcast five out of five stars calling it "a joy". Fiona Sturges of the Financial Times praised the show's "depth, curiosity and, on occasion, some proper punches to the gut." John Phipps of The Spectator gave a positive account of the events of Series 1 and claimed that this podcast proves that Theroux leaves most of his peers "trailing in the gutter".
