= Jim Cairns =

Australian politician (1914–2003)

The Honourable Jim Cairns
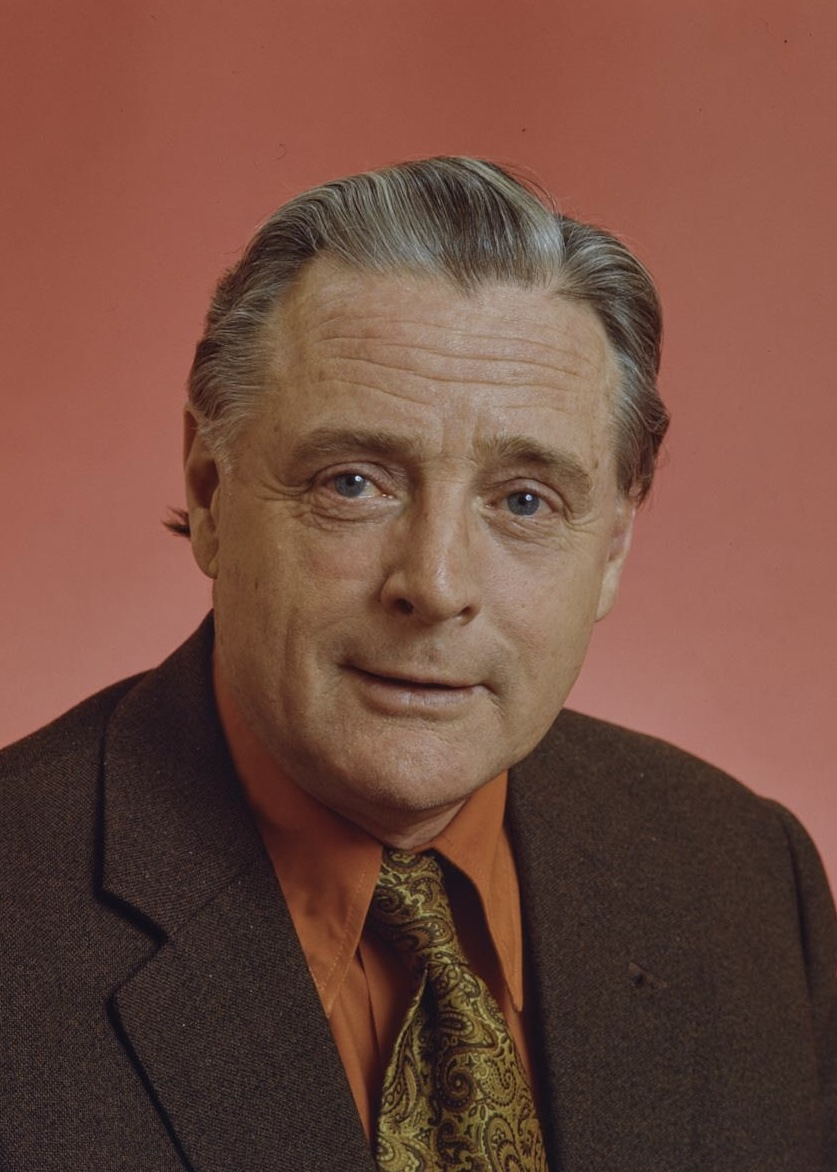
- Official portrait, 1974

Deputy Prime Minister of Australia
- In office 12 June 1974 – 2 July 1975
- Prime Minister: Gough Whitlam
- Preceded by: Lance Barnard
- Succeeded by: Frank Crean

Treasurer of Australia
- In office 11 December 1974 – 6 June 1975
- Prime Minister: Gough Whitlam
- Preceded by: Frank Crean
- Succeeded by: Bill Hayden

Minister for the Environment
- In office 6 June 1975 – 2 July 1975
- Prime Minister: Gough Whitlam
- Preceded by: Moss Cass
- Succeeded by: Gough Whitlam

Minister for Overseas Trade
- In office 19 December 1972 – 11 December 1974
- Prime Minister: Gough Whitlam
- Preceded by: Gough Whitlam
- Succeeded by: Frank Crean

Minister for Secondary Industry
- In office 19 December 1972 – 9 October 1973
- Prime Minister: Gough Whitlam
- Preceded by: Gough Whitlam
- Succeeded by: Kep Enderby

Deputy Leader of the Labor Party
- In office 12 June 1974 – 2 July 1975
- Leader: Gough Whitlam
- Preceded by: Lance Barnard
- Succeeded by: Frank Crean

Member of the Australian Parliament for Lalor
- In office 25 October 1969 – 10 November 1977
- Preceded by: Mervyn Lee
- Succeeded by: Barry Jones

Member of the Australian Parliament for Yarra
- In office 10 December 1955 – 25 October 1969
- Preceded by: Stan Keon
- Succeeded by: Division abolished

Personal details
- Born: James Ford Cairns; 4 October 1914 Carlton, Victoria, Australia
- Died: 12 October 2003 (aged 89) Narre Warren East, Victoria, Australia
- Party: Australian Labor Party
- Spouse: Gwen Robb
- Education: University of Melbourne
- Occupation: Policeman, lecturer

James Ford Cairns (4 October 1914 – 12 October 2003) was an Australian politician who was prominent in the Labor movement through the 1960s and 1970s, and was briefly Treasurer and the fourth deputy prime minister of Australia, both in the Whitlam government. He is best remembered as a leader of the movement against Australian involvement in the Vietnam War, for his affair with Junie Morosi, and for his later renunciation of conventional politics. He was also an economist, and a prolific writer on economic and social issues. Many of his books were self-published, and self-marketed at stalls he ran across Australia.

== Early days ==
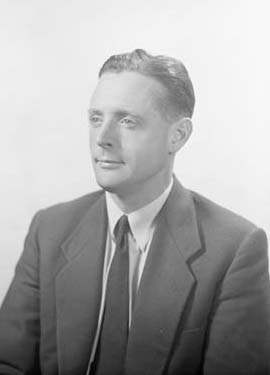
Cairns c. 1956

James Ford Cairns was born in Carlton, then a working-class suburb of Melbourne, the son of a clerk. He grew up on a dairy farm north of Sunbury. His father went to World War I as a lieutenant in the Australian Imperial Force, but became disillusioned with the war and lost his respect for Britain. Following the war, he did not return to Australia and essentially deserted his family. He travelled to Africa where he committed suicide after a stay of six or seven years.

Many years later, Cairns told Gough Whitlam that he had long believed his father had been killed in World War I, but that he was eventually told the truth of his father's desertion.

Cairns attended Sunbury State School and Northcote High School, where he completed his Leaving Certificate. Though life during the Depression was difficult. His mother had to work to provide for the family, and Cairns needed travel for three hours a day to attend Northcote High. He was a good student, making his name as an athlete, easily winning the school's broad jump championship with a leap of 20 feet 2 inches (6.15 m), his competitors only managing jumps of 16 to 17 feet (4.9 to 5.2 m).

In January 1935, Cairns joined the Victoria Police to give himself more time for athletics. He soon became a detective and gained notoriety working in a special surveillance unit, the Observation Squad, known by their colleagues as "The Dogs", where he was involved in a number of dramatic arrests. While working, he studied at night at the University of Melbourne and completed an economics degree. He was the first Victorian policeman to hold a tertiary degree. In 1939, he married Gwen Robb (died 2000), whose two sons he adopted.

Cairns resigned from the force in 1944. Thereafter, he was, successively, as a tutor and lecturer in the Australian Army, and a senior lecturer in economic history, at the University of Melbourne. He was a knowledgeable economist and was considered a socialist. In 1946 he applied to join the Communist Party, but was rejected.

Following that rejection, Cairns joined the Labor Party (ALP) and became active in its left wing. By that time, the Victorian branch of the ALP had been infiltrated by the anti-communists, predominantly Catholic, Industrial Groups ("Groupers"), associated with Archbishop Mannix and B. A. Santamaria. Cairns became a leading opponent of the Groupers.

In 1955, when the federal Labor leader, H. V. Evatt, attacked the Groupers, precipitating a major split in the Labor Party, Cairns sided with Evatt. At the 1955 election, Cairns stood for the ALP for the working-class seat of Yarra, in the House of Representatives, held by the leading Grouper, Stan Keon. In what Cairns has been quoted as saying was "... the most active and intense and vigorous election campaign that's ever been run in Australia", Cairns was elected and held Yarra until 1969, when the electorate was abolished at a redistribution.

He shifted to the electorate of Lalor in Melbourne's western and south-western suburbs. The seat had been in Labor hands since its creation in 1949, and prior to 1969, it also included areas north of and outside of Melbourne. It had been won by the Liberal candidate Mervyn Lee in 1966, as part of that year's pro-Liberal landslide. However, the same redistribution prior to the 1969 election had shrunk Lalor to a quarter of its size in south-west Melbourne, wiped out the party's majority and gave Labor a notional majority of six per cent. Lee made an unsuccessful attempt to transfer to the seat of Bendigo which had replaced part of Lalor. Cairns easily won Lalor with a healthy swing.

== Leading left-winger ==
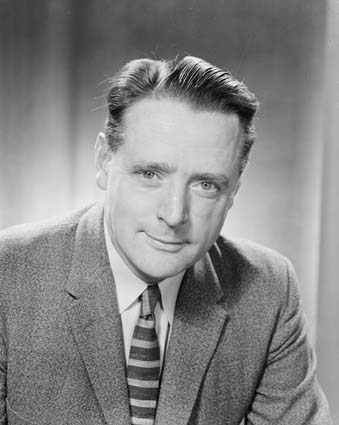
Cairns c. 1962

In Canberra, Cairns became a leader of the left faction of the ALP. He was a highly effective debater and was soon feared and disliked by ministers in the Liberal government of Robert Menzies, although his personal dealings with Menzies himself, who nearly always felt a healthy respect for an intelligent and principled adversary, were more cordial than might have been expected. Cairns was also disliked by many in his own party, who saw him as an ideologue, whose political views were too left-wing for the Australian electorate. Like many Labor figures of his generation, Cairns spent most of his best years in opposition due to the unbroken run in government by the Coalition from 1949 to 1972.

Nevertheless, Cairns' abilities could not be denied. He completed his doctorate in economic history in 1957 and, by the 1960s, he was among the Labor Party's leading figures. At that time, he also lectured on Marxist and socialist history, and taught free seminars in Melbourne for working people who were unable to afford tertiary education. His first overseas trip, which he took place at this time to the US and Asia, had a great effect on him.

Early in 1967, the septuagenarian Arthur Calwell retired as Labor leader, and Cairns unsuccessfully contested the leadership, against Gough Whitlam. The following year, when Whitlam briefly offered his resignation as part of his fight against the left wing of the party, Cairns again contested the leadership. Although he again failed to win, the margin was much smaller than in the previous year. If four ALP parliamentarians had changed their minds, Cairns would have been successful. Whitlam appointed Cairns as shadow minister for trade and industry. By that time, Cairns, like other left-wing firebrands of his generation, such as Clyde Cameron and Tom Uren, strongly supported Whitlam, as they were sober enough to realise Labor would never win power again without policies Whitlam was developing, which directly appealed to the middle class.

One of the reasons Cairns did not become leader of the Labor Party was that, in the late 1960s and early 1970s, his main focus was not on parliamentary politics but on leading the mass movement against the Vietnam War, to which the Menzies government had committed combat troops in 1965, and against conscription for that war. Until about 1968, most Australians supported the war. Whitlam himself was cautious about publicly committing the ALP to an explicitly anti-war stance. Opposition to Australia's role in Vietnam was led by the Communist Party, trade unions, and student groups. After 1968, however, non-communist opposition grew, and Cairns came to see the anti-war movement as a moral crusade. During the election year of 1969, a group of men broke into Cairns’ home, assaulted him, as well as seriously injuring his wife.

In 1968, the psychiatrist John Diamond conducted a series of in-depth, psychologically probing interviews with Cairns. The interviews, which were recorded on audiotape, have been described as "politically unique" by one of Cairns' biographers. They were initiated by the Department of Political Science at Monash University, which was interested in researching the psychological motivations of politicians, but Cairns continued them privately with Diamond over the course of a year, finding them to be "a voyage of self-discovery". Another of Cairns' biographers, Paul Strangio, noted how, in his interview technique, Diamond successfully "managed to penetrate his subject’s emotional defences".

In May 1970, Cairns, as chair of the Vietnam Moratorium Campaign, led an estimated 100,000 people through an anti-Vietnam War demonstration in the streets of Melbourne. It was the largest protest in Australia until it was overtaken by the anti-Iraq war protests in February 2003. Protests took place simultaneously in other Australian cities. The violence predicted by some opponents of the demonstration did not occur, and the moral force of the, mainly young, protesters had a major effect on Australian attitudes to the war.

== Cairns in government ==
At the December 1972 election, Whitlam led the Labor Party into government for the first time in 23 years, and Cairns became Minister for Overseas Trade and Minister for Secondary Industry. He had shed much of his socialist ideology of earlier years by than, though he was still a strong believer in state planning. He got along surprisingly well with the heads of industry, although critics said that was because he was sympathetic to their requests for government assistance. During his time as Minister for Trade and Minister for Secondary Industry, Cairns undertook a number of overseas trade missions. The most successful was his mission to China, which resulted in an increase in Sino-Australian trade, from 200 million dollars before the visit to 1,000 million dollars a year after his visit. After the 1974 election, Cairns was elected Deputy Leader of the Labor Party, defeating Lance Barnard 54 votes to 42, and thus became Deputy Prime Minister.

In June, ‘’The Bulletin’’ magazine published a leaked Australian Security Intelligence Organisation document which gave a controversial and highly political view of Cairns. The political fallout from the leak led the government to act on its 1974 election policy to establish the Royal Commission on Intelligence and Security.

In December 1974, Whitlam appointed Cairns as Treasurer, which was the high point of Cairns' political career. On Christmas Day 1974, while Whitlam was overseas, Cyclone Tracy devastated the city of Darwin, and Cairns, as Acting Prime Minister, impressed the nation with his sympathetic and decisive leadership. It was during that period that Cairns hired Junie Morosi as his principal private secretary, and he soon began a relationship with her which would eventually help ruin his career.

Australia's already severe economic problems worsened during 1975, and Cairns had few answers to the new phenomenon of stagflation, the combination of high unemployment and high inflation that followed the 1973 oil crisis. Overseas finance ministers, especially in Britain and Europe, faced the same problems at the time but, because few Australians were exposed to the foreign media, the economic credibility of the Whitlam administration suffered.

== Loans affair ==
In late 1974, in an attempt to raise funds for large capital works projects, such as drilling for gas on the north-west shelf between Australia and Timor and constructing a pipeline for transporting the gas down to Eastern Australia, senior ministers Rex Connor and Lionel Murphy, along with Prime Minister Gough Whitlam, began to consider arrangements to borrow approximately US$4,000 million petrodollars from the Middle East. The plan was to use the services of an intermediary, Pakistani banker Tirath Khemlani. Cairns first became aware of what was to become known as the "Loans Affair" three days after being appointed Treasurer, on 13 December 1974, when he entered at the end of a meeting of the Labor Party federal executive at the Lodge, the official residence of the Prime Minister in Canberra. Whitlam explained the situation and asked that Cairns co-sign approval for the loan. Cairns did so, noting to Whitlam that the state premiers should be informed of the loan, which did not occur.

Subsequently, Sir Frederick Wheeler, Secretary of the Treasury (the head of Cairns' department) and other members of staff advised Cairns that Khemlani was of questionable character. In his capacity as Acting Prime Minister during Gough Whitlam's overseas trip covering late 1974 to early 1975, Cairns arranged a meeting at the Reserve Bank in Canberra attended by various senior officials, including Lionel Murphy and Rex Connor. Connor's authority to borrow the loan was cancelled as a result of the meeting. Whitlam returned from overseas on 19 January 1975 and, on 27 January 1975, Connor's authority to borrow the loan was reinstated without consultation with Cairns, who found out after the fact.

A short time later, when Cairns was about to visit the United States in an official capacity, his staff informed him that if the issue of the Khemlani loan were not dealt with, it would most likely overshadow his visit. That, plus Cairns' pre-existing reservations about the loan, prompted him to discuss the issue once again with Whitlam, who then agreed that Connor's dealings with Khemlani should come to an end. Cairns delivered the news to Connor at Whitlam's request. Connor was later dismissed by Whitlam for continuing his unauthorised business communications with Khemlani. Whitlam moved Cairns from Treasury to the Environment ministry.

Cairns' political undoing began with an incident that is often conflated with the Connor/Khemlani dealings but was essentially separate. In 1974, Cairns was introduced by Robert Menzies to George Harris, a Melbourne businessman and president of the Carlton Football Club. Harris had offered to secure loan funds for the Australian government and, in March 1975, Cairns signed a letter agreeing to a 2.5% commission. When Cairns gave a misleading statement in June to Parliament that he had not authorised any such commission, many blamed the disorganised state of Cairns’ office. Cairns claimed that he had signed the letter in question unknowingly while signing a batch of fifty or so letters and that it was not an uncommon practice for politicians to sign letters that they had little or no memory of signing.

Ironically, opposition politicians, including Malcolm Fraser and a number of his shadow cabinet members, spoke in defence of Cairns, noting that they had also signed letters of which they had little or no memory. However, since Cairns had signed the letter, Whitlam dismissed him from the ministry on 2 July 1975. Cairns remained, officially at least, deputy leader of the ALP, but chose not to fight Whitlam's decision in Caucus to avoid damaging the party further. His successor, Frank Crean, was elected on 14 July.

Cairns later stated that he felt there were ulterior motives at play on the part of Gough Whitlam; namely that Whitlam wished to be rid of Cairns because Cairns did not agree with a policy of economic rationalism and that Whitlam felt that Cairns was a threat to his leadership.

== Cairns and Morosi ==
In late 1974, Cairns met Junie Morosi, who had worked for Al Grassby and Lionel Murphy. Morosi greatly admired Cairns, having read his academic writings, and she introduced Cairns to the work of Wilhelm Reich, opening his mind to the relevance of human psychology as it related to social change. Cairns decided to offer Morosi a position as his principal private secretary and the pair began an affair.

On 2 December 1974, the media reported Cairns' employment offer to Morosi. The reports highlighted Morosi's lack of public service experience, past business failures and her physical beauty, and noted that she had often been seen dining in Canberra with senior Cabinet ministers. As a result, Cairns and Morosi announced that she would not take Cairns' offer of employment. The Liberal Opposition called for a Senate inquiry. An investigation found there was no evidence of impropriety on the part of Morosi or of no preferential treatment being given to Morosi. On 13 December, it was reported that Morosi would accept Cairns' offer of employment.

During the Australian Labor Party National Conference in February 1975, Cairns gave an interview to a reporter in which he spoke of "a kind of love" for Morosi, reigniting the controversy. The press continued to speculate about an affair. During the 1975 National Conference, a photographer hid in a tree and waited while Morosi, her husband, Cairns, and his wife were having breakfast on a balcony. This photographer took a photo just when Cairns’ wife left the balcony and with Morosi's husband out of shot. The Daily Telegraph ran the picture of Cairns and Morosi the next day with the headline "Breakfast with Junie". Allegations were made in the House and the Senate, and accusations of misconduct were made by a variety of institutions.

In 1982, Morosi took 2UE and The Daily Mirror to court on defamation charges, with both Cairns and Morosi denying the accusations of sexual impropriety and corruption. In the Supreme Court of New South Wales, Cairns denied under oath having had a sexual relationship with Morosi. The jury found that the article in question did contain "an imputation" that Cairns was "improperly involved with his assistant, Junie Morosi, in a romantic or sexual association", but that the statement was not defamatory. Cairns did not receive compensation, although Morosi did.

On ABC radio in September 2002, Cairns admitted that he had a sexual relationship with Morosi. Four years earlier, referring to his decision to employ Morosi and the ensuing media storm that it created, Cairns said that "looking back over it, it was a mistake on my part".

== Aftermath ==
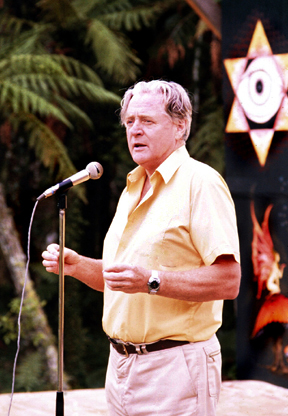
Cairns at Nambassa, 1981

In 1977, Cairns retired from Parliament. He devoted the next portion of his life to the counterculture movement, to which he had been introduced by Morosi. He sponsored a series of Down to Earth conference-festivals, known as ConFests, at various rural locations, and was photographed taking part in counterculture-inspired activities, such as meditation.

Cairns was subject to a great deal of media ridicule for those activities, but displayed his usual firm conviction about the rightness of his causes. In his later years, he lived at Narre Warren East near Melbourne. He sold his books outside suburban markets, where he would talk about politics, history or his life. In 1979, Cairns severed his formal links with the Down to Earth organisers, but kept in contact with Morosi and the two remained friends.

In 1983, Cairns made an unsuccessful run for the Senate as an independent and won 0.5% of the vote. Although he had not resigned from the ALP when he made his independent Senate run, the Labor Party did not expel him and he remained a party member. He let his party membership lapse in 1991 but rejoined the party in 1996.

In 2000, he was made a Life Member of the Labor Party. Cairns died of bronchial pneumonia, aged 89, in October 2003 and was accorded a state funeral at St John's Anglican Church in Toorak.

== Personal life ==
Cairns married Gwen Robb in 1939. He adopted Robb's two sons by her previous marriage, Barry and Phillip, when they were 4 and 5 years old respectively. Cairns claimed no religious affiliation. In a 1998 interview, he said: "I have never believed myself to be anything that I can attach a name to. I was not a Christian. I did not regard myself as a humanist or a socialist. I was something: what I am, and it did not have a name".

== Bibliography ==
- Cairns, G. O. & Cairns, J. F., Australia, 1953
- Cairns, J. F., Socialism and the A.L.P., comment by Bruce McFarlane, 1963
- Cairns, J. F., Living with Asia, 1965
- Cairns, J. F., Vietnam : is it truth we want?, 1965
- Cairns, J. F., Economics and foreign policy, 1966
- Cairns, J. F., Here I stand : statements, 1966
- Cairns, J. F., Changing Australia's role in Asia, 1968
- Cairns, J. F., Australian foreign policy, 1968
- Cairns, J. F., Eagle and the lotus; western intervention in Vietnam 1847-1968, 1969
- Cairns, J. F. & Cairns M.P., Silence kills; events leading up to the Vietnam Moratorium, 8 May 1970
- Cairns, J. F., Eagle and the lotus : Western intervention in Vietnam, 1847-1971, 1971
- Cairns, J. F., Tariffs or planning? : the case for reassessment, 1971
- Cairns, J. F., Quiet revolution, 1972
- Cairns, J. F., Impossible attainment, 1974
- Cairns, J. F., Labor Party? Dr. Evatt - the Petrov affair - the Whitlam government., 1974
- Cairns, Jim, Vietnam : scorched earth reborn, 1976
- Cairns, Jim, Oil in troubled waters, 1976
- Cairns, Jim, Growth to freedom, 1979
- Cairns, Jim, Survival now: the human transformation, 1982
- Cairns, Jim, Human growth, its source and potential, 1984
- Cairns, Jim, Strength within: towards an end to violence, 1988
- Cairns, Jim, Towards a new society : a new day has begun, 1990–1993
- Cairns, Jim, Untried road, 1990
- Cairns, Jim, Reshaping the future : liberated human potential, 1996
- Cairns, Jim, On the horizon: a cultural transformation to a new consciousness, 1999
- Cairns, Jim, Liberated biological function: the source of human quality, 2001
- Cairns, Jim, New day : liberated biological human potential: the source of social reform to the good society there's no other way, 2002
- Heffernan, Jack, Socialist alternative : an A.L.P. view, foreword by J.F. Cairns, 1969

== Sources ==
- Film Australia (1998), "Jim Cairns", Australian Biography, National Film and Sound archive, Commonwealth of Australia
- Harris, George; Main, Jim (2006). George - by George: Changi, the Blues and Beyond. Melbourne, Victoria: Bas Publishing. ISBN 1-920910-67-0.

Parliament of Australia
Preceded by Stan Keon	Member of Parliament for Yarra; 1955–1969	Division abolished
Preceded by Mervyn Lee	Member of Parliament for Lalor; 1969–1977	Succeeded by Barry Jones
Political offices
Preceded by Gough Whitlam	Minister for Secondary Industry; 1972–1973	Succeeded by Kep Enderby
Preceded by Gough Whitlam	Minister for Overseas Trade; 1972–1974	Succeeded by Frank Crean
Preceded by Lance Barnard	Deputy Prime Minister of Australia; 1974–1975	Succeeded by Frank Crean
Preceded by Frank Crean	Treasurer; 1974–1975	Succeeded by Bill Hayden
Preceded by Moss Cass	Minister for the Environment; 1975	Succeeded by Gough Whitlam
Party political offices
Preceded by Lance Barnard	Deputy Leader of the Australian Labor Party; 1974–1975	Succeeded by Frank Crean
