= ConFest =

Bush campout festival in Australia

Coordinates: 35°08′05″S 144°09′23″E

ConFest is an alternative bush campout festival held in the south-eastern states of Australia annually during and around Easter. The name 'ConFest' is a concatenation of the words Conference and Festival. ConFest was initiated at Cotter River (ACT) in 1976, and organised by the former Deputy Prime Minister of Australia, Dr. Jim Cairns, his private secretary Junie Morosi and David Ditchburn. It was and is intended to bring together the various subcultures of the alternative movement, and was billed as "An Exploration of Alternatives".

The event has been run almost continuously by the same cooperative society; The Down To Earth Co-op (DTE), based in Victoria. ConFest now hosts some 7000 participants annually for a 5-day festival over the Australia's Easter long weekend. The current ConFest Site is located to the West of Deniliquin and about 12 km from Moulamein in New South Wales. The area is open forest with the Edward River running along the southern side of the property.

== Features ==
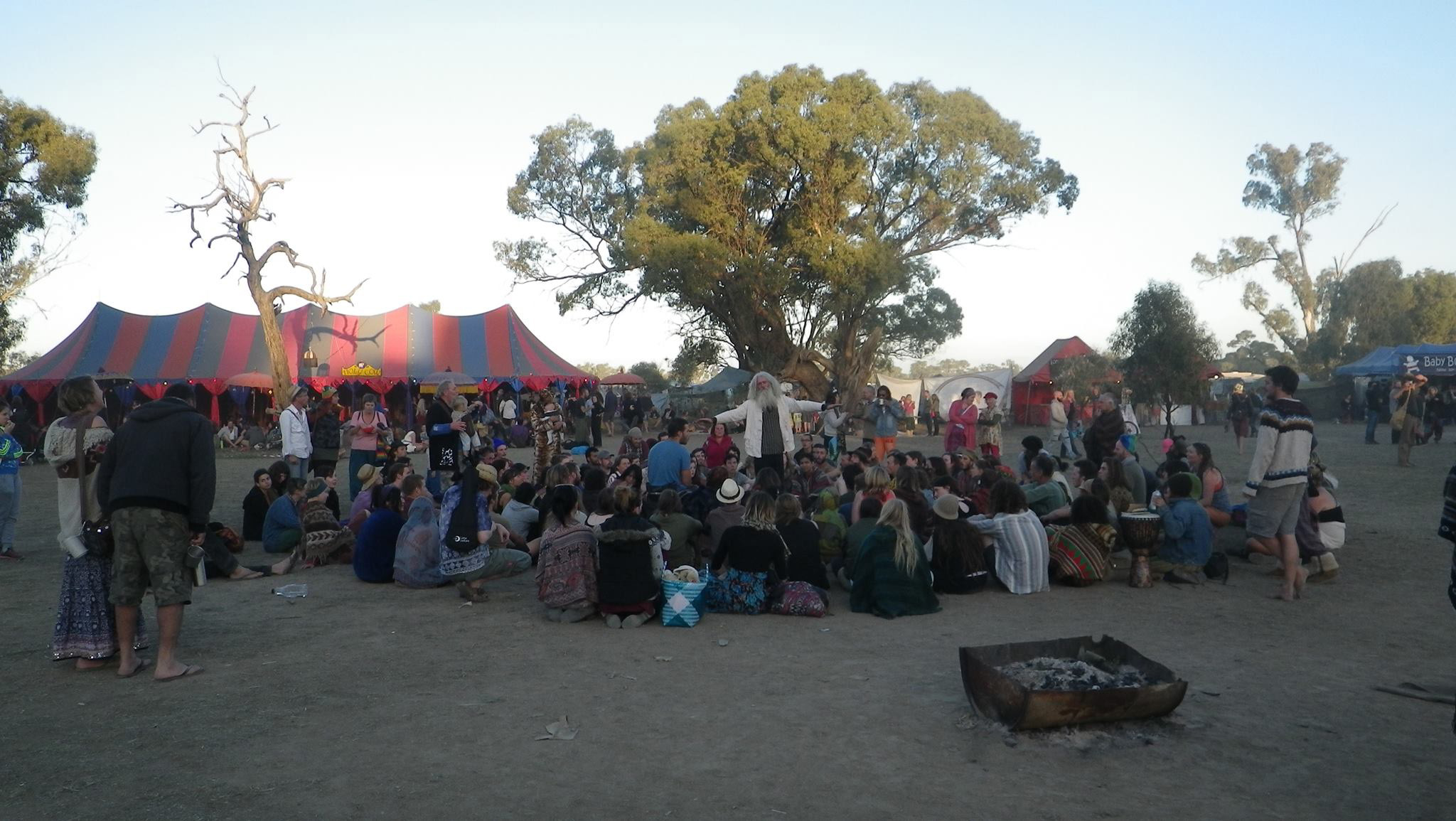
Spontaneous choir Easter ConFest 2014

Confest is typically divided up in to a number of discrete "villages" situated along a tree-lined river. These villages host a number of themed "spaces" where participants host workshops that are listed on an open agenda board displayed centrally in the festival. Workshops typically include yoga, meditation, permaculture, arts, music, and sexuality. However, many of the spaces are open to a range of eclectic and diverse topics. Villages also host shared kitchen spaces where communal cooking and food sharing is encouraged. The extensive Arts Village hosts many of the festivals major gathering points.

Villages surround a central open paddock which hosts a food and arts marketplace. This marketplace is the only location within the festival where money is used. It also hosts a number of activities such as a spontaneous choir and informal fashion parade. Surrounding the marketplace is a dedicated area for Fire Twirling, an information tent where participants can find out about the various villages and workshops, and a silent disco space.

== Villages and notable spaces (Easter Confest 2019) ==
- Acro Town
- The Arts Village
- Permaculture Village
- Tranquility (Drug and Alcohol free)
- Cause Way
- Aboriginal and Wemba-Wemba Villages
- Consent Cove
- Veg Out Village
- 'Doing it Ourselves' Village
- Drumming Village
- Poly Village
- Nudies Village
- Family Village
- Gypsy Village
- Rainbow Village (LGBTQIA+ focused)
- Uncertainty Village (Science and reason focused)
- Wilding Village (2018 to 2024)
- Bliss (Vegan, wheat-free communal living located in Tranquility)
- Open Stage (acoustic, impromptu performances of the arts)
- Marketplace (vegetarian)
- Silent Disco
- Gokula space
- Presence Tent
- Eco Village
- Wellness
- Holi Colour
- Seder
- Workshop spaces

== History ==
The first ConFest was held in 1976 on a property at Cotter River near Canberra in the Australian Capital Territory. It was initiated and organised by the former Deputy Prime Minister of Australia, Dr. Jim Cairns, his private secretary Junie Morosi and David Ditchburn.

In the early days, the organising committee rented space from various property owners, normally on or near the Murray River. However, due to dramatically increased insurance costs, it became increasingly difficult to locate suitable locations, until in the early years of the 21st century a property became available for purchase. After an extraordinary general meeting of DTE the decision was made to purchase the property, located near Gulpa Creek, 15 kilometres (9.3 mi) south of Deniliquin, New South Wales. The site has outdoor camping facilities and has about 4,000 metres (13,000 ft) of river frontage and about 400 hectares (1,000 acres) of space.

== Event Timeline ==
Confest History
Year	Time of year	Location	Name/Notes	Population estimate
1976	December	Cotter River (ACT)	Shaping Of Alternatives	9,000 - 10,000
1977/78	New Year	Bredbo (Mt Oak, NSW)	Focus for a Future	15000
1979	Autumn/Easter	Berri SA (on Murray River)	The Year of the Child	5,500-7,000
1980	January 25-28	French Island, Vic	Cairns' event not supported by DTE	2000
1980	May	Rainbow Region Gathering at Wytaliba NSW	Largely rained out	
1981	January 23-February 6	Glenlyon I (Daylesford)	Welcoming and Exploring the New Age	3000
1982	January 28-February 1	Glenlyon II	Viable Futures Through Loving Action	8000
1983/84	New Year	Baringa I	Wangaratta, Vic Making Alternatives Work	5000
1984/85	New Year	Baringa II	Peace	4000
1986	January 24-27	Glenlyon III		
1986/87	New Year	Glenlyon IV		
1987/88	New Year	Mt Oak NSW	10 year anniversary	1200
1988	Jan	Permacroft (Seymour, Vic)	Resurgence of the Call For a New Society	
1988/89	New Year	Walwa I	On the Murray River	3500
1989/90	New Year	Walwa II		4000
1990/91	New Year	Walwa III	Heal Thy Self - Thy Planet	5000
1992	Autumn/Easter	Toc I (Tocumwal NSW)	Continuing the Tradition.	
1993	Autumn/Easter	Toc II	Weaving the Web.	
1993/94	New Year	Moama I		
1994	Autumn/Easter	Toc III		4000
1994/95	New Year	Moama II		9000
1995/96	New Year	Tocumwal Birdlands (diff site)	A Birdlands Experience	9500
1996	Autumn/Easter	oc IV	Back to the River Harvest Festival	4000
1996/97	New Year	Moama IV		>6,000
1997	Autumn/Easter	Moama V		5000
1997/98	New Year	Gum Lodge I (Tocumwal)		6500
1998	Autumn/Easter	Gum Lodge II		4000
1998/99	New Year	Guilmartens I (Tocumwal)	Universal Togetherness	3500
1999	Autumn/Easter	Guilmartens II	What's Alternative Now? 'unplugged'	2000
1999/00	New Year	Guilmartens III (Tocumwal)		2500
2000	Autumn/Easter	Guilmartens IV (Tocumwal)		2200
2000/01	New Year	Gulpa Creek I (between Echuca & Deniliquin)	Earth Odyssey	2500
2001	Autumn/Easter	Gulpa Creek II (between Echuca & Deniliquin)		2500
2001/02	New Year	Gulpa Creek III (between Echuca & Deniliquin)		3800
2002	Autumn/Easter	Gulpa Creek IV (between Echuca & Deniliquin)		3800
2002/03	New Year	Gulpa Creek Bylands I (between Echuca & Deniliquin)	At 'new' DTE owned site	2500
2003	Autumn/Easter	Gulpa Creek Bylands II (between Echuca & Deniliquin)		3200
2003/04	New Year	Gulpa Creek Bylands III (between Echuca & Deniliquin)		2,200?
2004	Autumn/Easter	Gulpa Creek Bylands IV (between Echuca & Deniliquin)		3200
2004/05	New Year	Gulpa Creek Bylands V (between Echuca & Deniliquin)		????
2005	Autumn/Easter	Gulpa Creek Bylands VI (between Echuca & Deniliquin)		????
2005/06	New Year	Gulpa Creek Bylands VII (between Echuca & Deniliquin)		2,000?
2006	Autumn/Easter	Gulpa Creek Bylands VIII (between Echuca & Deniliquin)		3000
2006/07	New Year	Edward River outside Moulamein, between Deniliquin and Swan Hill	Held at a property purchased by DTE in 2005/6. 2nd property purchased, and owned by DTE	3000
2007	Autumn/Easter	Edward River outside Moulamein, between Deniliquin and Swan Hill		2300
2007/08	New Year	Edward River outside Moulamein, between Deniliquin and Swan Hill		1500
2008	Autumn/Easter	Edward River outside Moulamein, between Deniliquin and Swan Hill		3000
2008/09	New Year	Edward River outside Moulamein, between Deniliquin and Swan Hill		1200
2009	Autumn/Easter	Edward River outside Moulamein, between Deniliquin and Swan Hill		3700
2009/10	New Year	Edward River outside Moulamein, between Deniliquin and Swan Hill		2500
2010	Autumn/Easter	Edward River outside Moulamein, between Deniliquin and Swan Hill		4000
2010/11	New Year	Edward River outside Moulamein, between Deniliquin and Swan Hill		3500
2011	Autumn/Easter	Edward River outside Moulamein, between Deniliquin and Swan Hill		
2011/12	New Year	Edward River outside Moulamein, between Deniliquin and Swan Hill		
2012	Autumn/Easter	Edward River outside Moulamein, between Deniliquin and Swan Hill		
2012/13	New Year	Edward River outside Moulamein, between Deniliquin and Swan Hill		
2013	Autumn/Easter	Edward River outside Moulamein, between Deniliquin and Swan Hill		
2013/14	New Year	Cancelled		
2014	Autumn/Easter	Edward River outside Moulamein, between Deniliquin and Swan Hill		
2014/15	New Year	Cancelled		
2015	Autumn/Easter	Edward River outside Moulamein, between Deniliquin and Swan Hill		
2016	Autumn/Easter	Edward River outside Moulamein, between Deniliquin and Swan Hill		5857
2017	Autumn/Easter	Edward River outside Moulamein, between Deniliquin and Swan Hill		6100
2018	Autumn/Easter	Edward River outside Moulamein, between Deniliquin and Swan Hill		
2019	Autumn/Easter	Edward River outside Moulamein, between Deniliquin and Swan Hill		
2020-2022		(festival cancelled during lock-down)		
2023	Autumn/Easter	Edward River outside Moulamein, between Deniliquin and Swan Hill		
2024	Autumn/Easter	Edward River outside Moulamein, between Deniliquin and Swan Hill		
2024	Spring/Halloween	Edward River outside Moulamein, between Deniliquin and Swan Hill		
2025	Autumn/Easter	Edward River outside Moulamein, between Deniliquin and Swan Hill		
2025	Spring/Halloween	Edward River outside Moulamein, between Deniliquin and Swan Hill		

== Climate ==
The property used for the March 2019 Confest gathering was one of two owned by the Down to Earth Cooperatives for the purpose of holding Confest gatherings. It is located approximately 12 kilometres (7.5 mi) south-east of the New South Wales town of Moulamein and 100 kilometres (62 mi) north-west of Deniliquin. This region generally has a warmer climate over Summer and Autumn, and a cooler climate over Winter relative to Melbourne where the highest proportion of event participants reside. The Summer Confest was cancelled and was not held for several years while fire mitigation work was carried out on the property. The Autumn Confest held over the Easter long weekend has continued while this has taken place. It is often referred to as "Easter Confest" due to its timing but is a non-denominational event with participants able to observe their own spiritual practices including candle lighting at designated events and spaces as long as there is no fire ban. In 2016 an additional Confest was organised for Spring. It was unable to go ahead due to flooding.

== Legal issues ==
In 2015 police reported that 38 of 54 people searched on the approach road to the event were found in possession of illicit substances.

There have been a number of assaults throughout the festival's history by a few individuals, including sexual assaults during massages and an attempted child abduction. In some cases, this has resulted in lifetime bans from the festival and police involvement.
