= Spy Handler =

2004 nonfiction book by Victor Cherkashin

- Author: Victor Cherkashin
- Language: English
- Publication date: 2004

Spy Handler is a 2004 nonfiction book by Victor Cherkashin. Victor Cherkashin recruited American spies Robert Hanssen and Aldrich Ames to work for the USSR's KGB.
