= Junie Morosi =

Australian businesswoman (born 1933)

Junie Morosi is an Australian businesswoman, who became a public figure in the 1970s through her relationship with Jim Cairns, Deputy Prime Minister in the Whitlam Labor government. Morosi's appointment as Cairns's principal private secretary, and the nature of her relationship with him, aroused intense media interest, and the affair contributed to Cairns's eventual dismissal from office and the fall of the government.

== Early life ==
Morosi was born in Shanghai, China, and educated in the Philippines. Her father was Italian and part-Chinese, her mother Portuguese and part-Chinese also. The family moved to Manila when she was a child and from age 8 she experienced life under Japanese occupation. She worked as a journalist, becoming political correspondent at the Manila daily newspaper Voz de Manila. She also worked in advertising and travel consultancy.

While Morosi was still a teenager she married a Filipino. Together they had three sons. In 1958, she was employed by Qantas, the Australian national airline. In 1962 she moved to Australia, where she married a British businessman living in Australia, David Ditchburn. She continued to work in the airline and travel industry until 1974, when she was employed as an assistant to Al Grassby, the Commissioner for Community Relations. Grassby had been a minister in the Whitlam government before losing his seat in the May 1974 election. Her new job brought her into contact with other Whitlam government ministers. In Canberra she read and was impressed by one of Jim Cairns' books, The Quiet Revolution, and arranged to meet him.

== Jim Cairns ==
Cairns was then Deputy Prime Minister and Treasurer in the Whitlam government. Tom Uren, another Whitlam minister and one of Cairns's closest friends, later recorded that "Jim and Junie were attracted to each other from the first time they met." She was attracted to his intellect and personal charisma, and he responded to her emotional warmth and unorthodox attitudes. Morosi greatly admired Cairns from having read his academic writings and she introduced Cairns to the work of Wilhelm Reich, opening his mind to the relevance of human psychology as it related to social change. The attraction soon became sexual, although whether and, if so, when their relationship became a sexual one remained a matter of speculation until 2002, when it was confirmed as such by Cairns.

In December 1974, Cairns offered Morosi a position as his Principal Private Secretary, a job traditionally held by a senior public servant. Her business background made the offer at least defensible, but she had no knowledge of Australian politics or economics, and not much experience of managing a large and complex office. The offer of employment aroused an immediate storm of sensationalist media coverage which began on 2 December 1974. The fact that Morosi was "exotic" (the media's code-word for "Asian"), youngish (she was 41) and attractive was given much prominence.

Cairns's friends urged him to withdraw the offer to Morosi, but out of both personal loyalty and a refusal to be bullied by the anti-Labor tabloid press, he refused. He said that there would have been no media outcry "if I had appointed a man, or even a woman who was not good-looking." Cairns and others pointed out that Elizabeth Reid, who had been appointed Whitlam's advisor on women's issues in 1973, had received the same sort of media attention. In any case, Cairns and Morosi soon jointly decided it would be best not to flame the media fire any further and both publicly stated that Morosi would not take Cairns' offer of employment. The Sydney Morning Herald and The Australian reported on Cairns' and Morosi's statements with "press accused of spying", claiming press vilification brought about the outcome, but in such a way that accepted no blame or responsibility. By this stage the media had raised the scandal to "Morosi storm rocking government" status, and bestowed upon it a moniker: "The Morosi Affair". The Liberal Opposition called for a senate inquiry into the business affairs of Morosi and Ditchburn.

After investigation, it was revealed that there were no irregularities and on 13 December 1974 it was reported that Morosi would accept Cairns' offer of employment. The media circus resumed. It was aggravated by Morosi's decision to give interviews to the Sydney tabloid The Sun and the mass-circulation Woman's Day. Morosi said: "If I had been a white Anglo-Saxon male there would have been no story at all. One day, I was the most sinister, deadly enemy of Australia – a member of the KGB, the Chinese mafia, you name it." During the Australian Labor Party's National Conference in February 1975, Cairns gave an interview to a hostile reporter in which he spoke of "a kind of love" for Morosi. The press continued to encourage speculation; at the National Conference, a photographer hid in a tree and waited while Morosi, her husband, Cairns and his wife were having breakfast on a balcony. The photographer took a photo just when Cairns' wife left the balcony and with Morosi's husband out of shot. The Daily Telegraph ran the picture of Cairns and Morosi the next day with the headline "Breakfast with Junie".

Allegations were levelled at Morosi that she used her position as Cairns' private secretary to cut Cairns off from his political associates and from alternative sources of advice. Morosi was working for Cairns during the incident that eventually led to Cairns' political demise. Cairns was introduced by Robert Menzies to George Harris, a Melbourne businessman and president of the Carlton Football Club. Harris had offered to secure loan funds for the Australian government and in March 1975, Cairns signed a letter agreeing to a 2.5% commission. Many blamed the disorganised state of Cairns’ office for what ultimately turned out to be a misleading statement to parliament in June that he had not authorised any such commission. Cairns claimed that he had signed the letter in question unknowingly while signing a batch of fifty or so letters, and that it was not uncommon practice for politicians to sign letters and subsequently to have little or no memory of their content. Ironically, politicians from across the aisle – Malcolm Fraser and a number of his ministers – spoke out in defence of Cairns on this subject, agreeing that they too signed letters of which they had little or no memory. But the fact remained that Cairns did sign the letter and, as a result, Whitlam dismissed Cairns from the ministry on 2 July 1975. The supposed relevance of this incident to Morosi is the implication that, as Cairns' private secretary, Morosi was to blame for any disorganisation present in Cairns' office that may have contributed to him signing the infamous letter but not remembering having done so. However, in a 1998 interview, when asked whether Morosi was a good office organiser, Jim Cairns was quoted as saying "No. She wasn't supposed to be an office organiser. The criticism that has been levelled at her is made by very jealous and envious people, who were supposed to be organising the bloody office themselves."

After Cairns was dismissed from the Ministry in July 1975, he kept Morosi on his backbencher's staff as a research assistant. She published her version of events in a book, Sex, Prejudice and Politics, later in the year. Together they worked on a new project for an alternative lifestyles festival to be held near Canberra. The Down to Earth Festival in December 1975 attracted 10,000–15,000 people. Cairns and Morosi continued to work on developing the movement until 1977, when Cairns retired from Parliament.

== Defamation case ==
Morosi gradually faded from public attention, but her tumultuous years in the spotlight continued to haunt her. Media outlets continued to make allegations about her relationship with Cairns, and she successfully sued 2GB and The Daily Mirror for defamation. She won $17,000 in damages from The Daily Mirror and $10,000 from 2GB. On 2GB Ormsby Wilkins had said that "Junie Morosi is an immoral adventuress who has slept with a variety of notable politicians."

In The Daily Mirror case, Morosi told the court: "I felt insulted, angry, upset and hurt. It was very demeaning to me as a woman [to be called Cairns's 'girlfriend']. I saw myself as a professional, as a competent person doing her job. It was cheap. It was as though it had nothing to do with business but everything to do with sex." The jury decided the article in question did imply a sexual relationship, but was "not defamatory." In 2002 Cairns admitted his relationship with Morosi had been sexual.

== Morosi's bibliography ==
- Morosi, Junie Sex, Prejudice and Politics, Camberwell, Victoria: Widescope International Publishers, 1975 ISBN 0-86932-009-2
- Morosi, Junie Tomorrow's Child, Canberra: Research for Survival, 1982 ISBN 0-9592700-0-0
