= Valera & Natasha Cherkashin =

Valera Cherkashin (August 23, 1948) and Natasha Cherkashin (April 19, 1958), known as Valera & Natasha Cherkashin, are contemporary artists who have been working as a duo since 1983. They work with photography, create happenings, installations, and video art.

== Biographies ==
Valera Cherkashin was born in Kharkov, Ukraine on August 23, 1948. In 1979, he moved to Leningrad, where he worked and exhibited with the "Sterligov's Group" - painters and artists who work and follow the traditions of the Russian avant-garde movement. A year later, Cherkashin moved to Moscow where he became more familiar with contemporary art and artists including Ilya Kabakov.

Valera met Natasha in the Moscow Metro in 1982. They married a year later. Their initial collaborations focused on images of public spaces and cultural memorials that defined the Soviet era. Photographs and newspapers became the basic materials for their artistic work. and in turn now document historical moments in this period of work entitled "The End of the Epoch". In one, now famous "happening", the Cherkashins staged an underground wedding at Moscow's "Revolutionary Square" metro station where a woman was "married" to one of the three-dimensional soldiers from the 1930s in a traditional ceremony. The Cherkashins like to express their conceptual ideas using traditional forms of visual culture. In their project "The End of the Epoch" they used the traditions of the Russian avant-garde, the form that was born at the junction of the two epochs.

In 1994, the Cherkashins left Russia for the first time and traveled to the United States by the invitation from the Museum of Fine Arts, Santa Fe, NM. Following their instincts to explore the cultural differences in the US, they returned to Russia with a new understanding of the historical changes reflected in their own culture. This led to other important series, such as "Mirage of Empires" and "Travel as Art" which led them to discover and record cultural monuments around the world. Their travels and projects have taken them to Germany, Spain, Great Britain, Italy, France, Austria, Japan, China, Mongolia and more.

Since 1994, the Cherkashins have traveled a lot and created a number of international projects. In 1999-2000 the Cherkashins created an underwater installation in the reflecting pool of the World Bank headquarters in Washington, DC, "Good-bye, Favorite European Portraits: Hello Euro." This installation merged ideas of art, money and national identity, to create a unique and provocative concept. The emergence of the Euro marked the beginning of the new era in the unity of European countries; however, some nostalgia as reflected in the installation was associated with the disappearance of the national currencies.

The ever-changing state of the world continually requires a search for new forms and materials to reflect it. In the late twentieth century, the Cherkashins began to work with digital technology and with the support of the New York School of Visual Arts (SVA). This collaboration inspired a whole new body of work that has taken on large proportions.

In 2005, the Cherkashins chose to develop further earlier themes of the metro series. A new project began in the subway of New York City and was soon transformed into a worldwide project. The "Global Underground" reveals the similarity and cultural diversity found in the underground transportation systems from countries and cities around the world. Video installation also became a concurrent part of the new project.

Most recently, the artists have been working on issues related to world economics, politics and environmental changes. In their series ("The Evolution of Chaos: Apocalypse,") the Cherkashins approach these issues by creating works that reflect society's self-destructive behavior. Since 2010, the noted shift in planetary climate change and the transition to the Age of Aquarius have influenced the Cherkashins to create a number of new series related to water. "Immersion," "Vibrations" and "Radiant Outburst" are among the new projects.

== Select personal exhibitions ==
- 1998 - Empires: Russia Past & Present. Together with Steve Yates and Bill Wright. The Center for Contemporary Arts, Abilene, TX.
- 1999 - Goodbye Favorite European Portraits: hello Euro. World Bank Headquarters Atrium Pool, Washington.
- 2000 - From USSR to Russia. International Center of Photography, Shadai Gallery, Tokyo, Japan.
- 2000 - Mirages of Empires. PhotoEspana 2000, Caja Madrid, Madrid, Spain. (Catalog)
- 2001 - Mirages of Empire. Russian American Cultural Center, New York, 2001; The State Russian Museum. St. Petersburg, 2002. (Catalog)
- 2005 - XV International Festival "Month of Photography in Bratislava", Slovakia.
- 2005 - *Futurism & Nostalgia. Great Neck Arts Center, New York
- 2005 - *New York Real and Unreal. Union of Photo Artists, Moscow.
- 2006 - Night with a Pioneer Leader, Glaz Gallery, Moscow House of Photography, Moscow.
- 2007 - Metro New York--Moscow. Harriman Institute, Columbia University, New York.
- 2007 - The End of the Epoch. Project Museum of the USSR. Andrey Sakharov Museum & Public Center. Moscow. (Catalog)
- 2008 - Jubilee exhibition. Union of Photo Artists. Moscow.
- 2008 - New York. Premonition. Museum of Modern Art, Rostov on Don, Russia. (Catalog)
- 2008 - Metro in art and Art in Metro. Exhibition in Moscow Museum of Modern Art. (Catalog)
- 2008 - Global Underground, Gallery Blue Square, Paris, 2008; Kennan Institute, Woodrow Wilson Center, Washington DC, 2008.
- 2009 - Exhibition in Barbarian-Art Gallery, Zurich (Catalog)
- 2009 - Moscow - Bilbao. Transfer. Center for Contemporary art Winzavod and Moscow Museum of Modern Art. Together with Ima Montoya. Moscow (Catalog)
- 2011 - Transportation Evolution. Dubai Experience. World Trade Center, Dubai.
- 2012 - XVII Encuentros Abiertos Festival De La Luz. Buenos Aires, Argentina. Evolution of Chaos.Scream of Apocalypse.
- 2012 - FotoFest 2012 Biennial - Perestroika: Liberalization & Experimentation. Mirages of Soviet Empire. Personal Exhibition. Houston, USA.
- 2013 - Alan Klotz Gallery. New York.
- 2014 - New York, Premonition. DEVE Gallery, Moscow.
- 2015 - Passion. The Church of St Peter in Chains, Mdina Cathedral Contemporary Art Biennale, Malta.
- 2015 - The Last November. 1990. Harriman Institute, Columbia University, New York.
- 2016 - How it Began. Kino-theater "Mir", Festival Photo-Krock, Vitebsk, Belarus.
- 2018 - Creative Gravity. Gallery Tennis Club. Moscow. (Catalog.)

== Collections ==
Valera & Natasha Cherkashin's work is held in the following permanent public collections:

- The Art Institute of Chicago; (1994, 1998), USA
- The Museum of Fine Art Santa Fe, NM
- The Los Angeles County Museum of Art, CA
- Museum of Fine Arts, Boston (2003, 2005), MA
- Philadelphia Museum of Art, PA
- Houston Museum of Fine Arts (1998, 2005), TX
- San Francisco Museum of Modern Art, CA
- Frederick R. Weisman Art Museum, University of Minnesota, Minneapolis, MN
- The Zimmerli Art Museum, Rutgers University, NJ
- Newseum, Washington, D.C.
- Harry Ransom Center, The University of Texas at Austin, TX
- The US Library of Congress, Washington D.C.
- The New York Public Library, NY
- The World Bank Headquarters, Washington D.C.
- Museum am Checkpoint Charlie, Berlin
- International Center of Photography, Tokyo
- Motorola Company, Moscow
- Foundation of Culture of Russia
- Kolodzei Art Foundation, NJ
- Museum of Contemporary Art, Rostov-on-Don
- The State Russian Museum, Saint Petersburg, Russia
- The Pushkin State Museum of Fine Arts, Moscow, Russia
