= Crackers the Corporate Crime Fighting Chicken =

Crackers the Corporate Crime Fighting Chicken is an anthropomorphic chicken dedicated to raising awareness of and combating corporate crime. Crackers first appeared on Michael Moore's television show TV Nation in 1994, and later appeared on Moore's The Awful Truth.

== Conception and history ==
If you accidentally bounce a check in Philadelphia, they'll hit you up for almost $30. Yee-oww!...Philly banks, look out. You're in for a swift kick from the Chicken Leg of Justice.

— Crackers the Corporate Crime Fighting Chicken writes about a possible corporate crime he was fighting in July 1995

First portrayed by Lee Brownstein, Crackers was later played by John Derevlany and Gideon Evans. Crackers first appeared on the show TV Nation, which won an Emmy Award in 1995 for Outstanding Informational Series. As with Moore's journalistic style, Crackers approached serious issues like worker's rights by interlacing his methods with humor. One example of Crackers' work was his intervention in the production of scab newspapers produced by the Detroit Free Press and Detroit News while their workers were on strike.

The character later appeared on Moore's television show The Awful Truth, in which he investigated various corporate crimes. His comedic attempts to confront individuals in charge were usually met with dismissal and/or being escorted out by security officials. For example, Crackers investigated alleged poor treatment of Disney workers at Walt Disney World, only to get banned from the premises. Another sketch features Crackers taking on Buckeye Egg Farms for animal cruelty towards chickens.
