= Ormsby Wilkins =

Australian radio presenter

- Born: 6 March 1916; Sydney, New South Wales, Australia
- Died: 18 February 1976 (aged 59); Melbourne, Victoria, Australia
- Career
- Station(s): 2UE, 2GB, 3AW
- Style: talk

Ormsby Cecil Wilkins (6 March 1916 - 18 February 1976) was an Australian radio presenter.

He is most notable for being the first person in Australia to take talkback calls when the format was made legal in 1967.

== Career ==
Wilkins' career began with the United States Information Service where he worked for a number of years before moving into journalism in 1949. Initially working for The Daily Mirror, he went on to work for The Daily Telegraph and The Argus.

Wilkins made the move to radio in 1963. Throughout his career, Wilkins worked at 2UE and 2GB in Sydney and Melbourne's 3AW.

Various attempts at talkback radio in Australia had occurred, dating back to 2BL's experiment in 1925. Stations 3AK and 2UW had also both tried it in 1963. However, every attempt was quickly abandoned due to strict broadcasting and telecommunications regulations stipulating that the broadcast of telephone conversations on radio was illegal. Just after midnight on 17 April 1967, Wilkins took the first legal talkback calls on Australian radio after the restrictions were lifted.

One of the most notable moments of his radio career came in 1974. During a phone interview with Russell Kelner, the operations manager of the Jewish Defense League, agents from the FBI suddenly stormed into Kelner's office in New York to conduct a raid and placed him under arrest. The commotion of the raid and the arrest of Kelner was clearly audible over the telephone line with Kelner telling Wilkins: "We are in a raid right now by the FBI. I have to hang up. We are all under arrest." The arrest came after death threats were levelled against Palestinian leader Yasser Arafat.

In August 1975, Wilkins used his 2GB program to describe Australian businesswoman Junie Morosi as an "immoral adventuress who has slept with a variety of notable politicians". This prompted Morosi to launch legal action against 2GB and Wilkins. She was awarded $10,000 in damages after it was found Wilkins had deliberately imputed Morosi as an undesirable, immoral and promiscuous woman who had misconducted herself with her employer.

Wilkins enjoyed an amicable relationship with the Jewish community in Australia who held him in high regard. He was regularly invited to speak at various functions.

Wilkins was outspoken on a number of issues. He openly criticised organisations such as the Melbourne Club for their policy not to admit Jews.

He criticised the Federal Government's decision to allow South Africa to send an all-white football team to Australia for the 1971 South Africa rugby union tour of Australia. He described Australia's international image being vulnerable due to the White Australia policy and the poor treatment of Indigenous Australians.

== Death ==
Ormsby Wilkins died at the age of 59 on 19 February 1976 of the lung cancer for which he had undergone an operation in November 1975.
