= Yuri Shvets =

Former intelligence officer (born 1953)

- Юрій Швець
- Born: 16 May 1953 (age 73); Kharkiv, Ukrainian SSR, Soviet Union (now Ukraine)
- Citizenship: American
- Education: Patrice Lumumba Peoples' Friendship University; Academy of Foreign Intelligence
- Espionage activity
- Allegiance: Soviet Union
- Agency: KGB
- Service years: 1980–1990
- Rank: Major
- Website: YouTube channel

Yuri Borysovych Shvets (Note: Ukrainian: Юрій Борисович Швець, romanized: Yurii Borysovych Shvets; Russian: Юрий Борисович Швец, romanized: Yury Borisovich Shvets) (born 16 May 1953) is a former Soviet intelligence officer of Ukrainian origin. He was a Major in the KGB between 1980 and 1990. From April 1985 to 1987, he was a resident spy in Washington, D.C. While there, he held a cover job as a correspondent for TASS, a Soviet state-owned news agency. He left the KGB in September 1990.

== Biography ==
Shvets graduated in international law from the Patrice Lumumba Peoples' Friendship University (now the Peoples' Friendship University of Russia). He also graduated from the Academy of Foreign Intelligence, where he reportedly studied alongside Vladimir Putin.

=== Career in the KGB ===
In his 1995 book, Washington Station, Shvets alleges he had recruited two key sources of political intelligence — "Socrates", a former aide to President Jimmy Carter with strong ties to Greece, and his wife "Sputnitsa" (Russian: Спутница, lit. 'companion'), a journalist working in Washington. Some of these details were called into question. Later, on "60 Minutes", Shvets had identified Socrates as John Helmer, an Australian-born journalist, who denied being Socrates.

=== Move to America ===
After publishing a book describing his exploits and ultimate falling-out with the KGB, Shvets was banned from foreign travel. In 1993, he moved permanently to the United States, where he later gained citizenship.

Shvets was a key source for the 2021 book American Kompromat by Craig Unger, which details claims that Donald Trump is a Soviet, and later Russian, asset.

=== Involvement with Alexander Litvinenko ===
In 2006, Shvets emerged as a potentially key witness in the poisoning of ex-Federal Security Service officer Alexander Litvinenko. In an interview with the BBC, broadcast on 16 December 2006, Shvets said that he and Litvinenko had compiled a report investigating the activities of senior Kremlin officials on behalf of a British company looking to invest "dozens of millions of dollars" in a project in Russia. Shvets said the dossier about Sergei Ivanov was so incriminating, it was likely that Litvinenko was murdered because of it. He said that Litvinenko had shown the dossier to another business associate, Andrei Lugovoi, who had worked for the FSB and had passed the dossier to his superiors in Moscow. Shvets was interviewed about it by Scotland Yard detectives investigating Litvinenko's murder.
