= Victor Cherkashin =

Russian spy

- Born: February 22, 1932 (age 94); Krasnoe, Russian SFSR, Soviet Union
- Occupation: KGB foreign counter-intelligence officer

Victor Ivanovich Cherkashin (Russian: Ви́ктор Ива́нович Черка́шин; born 22 February 1932) is a former Soviet foreign counter-intelligence officer of the PGU KGB SSSR. He was the case officer for both Aldrich Ames, a CIA counter-intelligence officer, and Robert Hanssen, an FBI agent.

== Career ==
Cherkashin joined the KGB in 1952 and retired in 1991. He was the case officer for both Aldrich Ames, a CIA counter-intelligence officer, and Robert Hanssen, an FBI agent, when they spied for the Soviet Union. Cherkashin served for many years in the KGB's First Chief Directorate, the department dedicated to foreign counter-intelligence. His career included tours in Lebanon, India, Australia, West Germany and Washington, DC.

Cherkashin was awarded the Order of Lenin in August 1986 for recruiting Aldrich Ames.

In 2004 he presented the book Spy Handler online at the Spy Museum in Washington, DC.

== Personal life ==
Cherkashin was the son of an NKVD officer. He received a diploma in railway engineering from the Moscow State Institute of Railway Engineering.

Cherkashin married KGB cipher clerk Elena, with whom he has two children. After his retirement from the KGB he established his own private security company in Moscow, where he now lives with Elena.

Victor and his wife Elena made an appearance on Anthony Bourdain: No Reservations on the Travel channel.

== Bibliography ==
- Cherkashin, Victor. (2004). Spy Handler: Memoir of a KGB Officer. The True Story of The Man Who Recruited Robert Hanssen & Aldrich Ames Basic. ISBN 0-465-00968-9.
