= 2012 North Carolina Amendment 1 =

North Carolina Amendment 1
- May 8, 2012
- North Carolina Same-Sex Marriage Amendment

Results
Choice	Votes	%
For	1,317,178	61.04%
Against	840,802	38.96%
Valid votes	2,157,980	98.87%
Invalid or blank votes	24,695	1.13%
Total votes	2,182,675	100.00%
Registered voters/turnout	6,296,759	34.27%
County results
Yes
80–90%
70–80%
60–70%
50–60%
No
70–80%
60–70%
50–60%

North Carolina Amendment 1 (often referred to as simply Amendment 1) is an overturned legislatively referred constitutional amendment in North Carolina that amended the Constitution of North Carolina to add ARTICLE XIV, Section 6, which prohibit the state from recognizing or performing same-sex marriages, civil unions or civil union equivalents by defining male–female marriage as "the only domestic legal union" considered valid or recognized in the state. It did not prohibit domestic partnerships in the state and also constitutionally protected same- and opposite-sex prenuptial agreements, which is the only part that is still in effect today. On May 8, 2012, North Carolina voters approved the amendment, 61% to 39%, with a voter turnout of 35%. On May 23, 2012, the amendment took effect.

State law had already defined marriage as being between a man and a woman prior to its passage. Amendment 1 was the last state constitutional amendment banning same-sex marriage to be passed in the United States via voter referendum, as well as the shortest-lived: it was found unconstitutional in federal court in October 2014 after then-Attorney General Roy Cooper declined to further defend it.

ARTICLE XIV, Section 6 of the North Carolina Constitution remains a partially unconstitutional constitutional amendment to this day. In order to repeal the overturned parts of the constitution, either 60% of the North Carolina General Assembly must approve a bill putting another legislatively referred constitutional amendment on the ballot and that amendment must be approved by a majority of voters or convention-referred constitutional amendment during a state constitutional convention, which also requires a majority of voters approval.

== Full text ==
ARTICLE XIV, Section 6 of the Constitution of North Carolina, as amended, states:

Marriage between one man and one woman is the only domestic legal union that shall be valid or recognized in this State. This section does not prohibit a private party from entering into contracts with another private party; nor does this section prohibit courts from adjudicating the rights of private parties pursuant to such contracts.

== Legislative approval ==
State constitutional prohibitions on same-sex marriage in the United States on 22 May 2012

Senate Bill 514 was introduced in the 2011 legislative session North Carolina. Sponsored by Republican State Senator Peter Brunstetter, the bill was passed by the North Carolina General Assembly in September 2011.

Final voting on SB 514 was as follows:

In the House:

- 75 Aye
- 42 No
- 2 Not Voting
- 1 Excused Absence

In the Senate:

- 30 Aye
- 16 No
- 4 Excused Absences

Ten House Democrats voted "aye": William Brisson, James W. Crawford, Jr., Elmer Floyd, Ken Goodman, Charles Graham, Dewey L. Hill, Frank McGuirt, William C. Owens, Jr., Garland E. Pierce and Timothy L. Spear. All House Republicans voted "aye" except for those who did not vote: D. Craig Horn, Chuck McGrady and Glen Bradley. All Senate Democrats voted "no" except for those who did not vote: Eric L. Mansfield (who publicly opposed the bill but was absent due to a planned wedding anniversary trip), Michael P. Walters and Stan White. All Senate Republicans voted "aye", except for one who did not vote, Fletcher Hartsell.

== Bill information ==
The long title of Senate Bill 514 is: "An Act to Amend the Constitution to Provide That Marriage Between One Man and One Woman is the Only Domestic Legal Union That Shall Be Valid or Recognized in This State."

The bill proposed to add a new section to article XIV, which covers miscellaneous provisions. The sections of the bill were:

- Section 1

"Marriage between one man and one woman is the only domestic legal union that shall be valid or recognized in this State. This section does not prohibit a private party from entering into contracts with another private party; nor does this section prohibit courts from adjudicating the rights of private parties pursuant to such contracts."

- Section 2

Specifies that the amendment shall be submitted to voters, and defines the ballot text.

- Section 3

Specifies that a simple majority vote is required for approval.

- Sections 4 and 5

Specify that the amendment will become effective when it is certified by the Secretary of State.

== Effects ==
The amendment constitutionally banned same-sex marriages, which were never recognized by the state and was statutorily banned since 1996, and civil unions or civil union equivalents, which were never recognized by the state. North Carolina became the 30th US state to ban same-sex marriage in its constitution and 20th US state to ban civil unions or civil union equivalents in its constitution. This preempted the state judiciary from requiring the state to legally recognize same-sex marriages or civil unions or civil union equivalents and preempted the North Carolina General Assembly from enacting a statute legalizing same-sex marriages or civil unions or civil union equivalents. Another section of the amendment constitutionally protected same-sex and opposite-sex prenuptial agreements, which was already statutorily codified in the Uniform Premarital Agreement Act in 1987. Domestic partnerships in North Carolina, legal in 4 counties and 7 municipalities at the time, were unaffected by the amendment.

== Potential effects ==
In a study by Maxine Eichner, Barbara Fedders, Holning Lau, and Rachel Blunk of the University of North Carolina School of Law, the authors discussed how the wording in the proposed amendment could have legal implications beyond banning marriage between same-sex couples. A white paper authored by Lynn Buzzard, William A. Woodruff, and Gregory Wallace of Campbell Law School disagreed with many of those claims.

=== Employee benefits ===
Some said that all unmarried couples, both same-sex and opposite-sex, and their children that are receiving domestic-partner benefits as public employees would no longer be eligible for those benefits under this amendment. The second sentence in the amendment sought to address this issue by continuing to allow private-party contracts between employees and employers. For example, a private company could agree to extend health benefits to employees and their partners. However, since "domestic legal union" was untested language in the courts, the issue was considered likely to face litigation to determine what the actual meaning would be and how it would be implemented.

=== Legal protections ===
In addition to restricting benefits to couples in domestic partnerships, the amendment could have also stripped protections for unmarried couples such as domestic violence and stalking protections. If the courts had determined that the language used in the amendment invalidates protections for unmarried couples it could have harmed domestic-violence protections for that population. After passing a similar constitutional amendment in Ohio, several courts ruled that domestic violence protections did not apply to unmarried couples and cases were dismissed or told not to press charges. The courts could have determined that validation of unmarried couples domestic legal union status would violate the amendment. However, the counter argument was that North Carolina's domestic-violence statutes were better defined and included protections for unmarried couples.

North Carolina Statute 50B-1, Domestic Violence, states:

(b) For purposes of this section, the term "personal relationship" means a relationship wherein the parties involved

(1) Are current or former spouses;

(2) Are persons of opposite sex who live together or have lived together;

(3) Are related as parents and children, including others acting in loco parentis to a minor child, or as grandparents and grandchildren. For purposes of this subdivision, an aggrieved party may not obtain an order of protection against a child or grandchild under the age of 16;

(4) Have a child in common;

(5) Are current or former household members;

(6) Are persons of the opposite sex who are in a dating relationship or have been in a dating relationship. For purposes of this subdivision, a dating relationship is one wherein the parties are romantically involved over time and on a continuous basis during the course of the relationship. A casual acquaintance or ordinary fraternization between persons in a business or social context is not a dating relationship.

Adoption and child-visitation protections were also in question. While North Carolina only allows adoption by one unmarried adult, there are cases where children are adopted by two unmarried adults (including same-sex couples) in other states and are now living in North Carolina. Since those relationships would not have been recognized under Amendment One, there were potentially serious consequences. In Potential Legal Impacts of the Proposed Same Sex Marriage Amendment, the authors concluded that in child-custody disputes "judges may interpret [amendment one] as an expression of public policy against all non-marital relationships. This interpretation may have caused judges to view such relationships as having a per se negative impact on a child, and fashion custody orders accordingly. They also said that in custody disputes between a parent and non-parent, the courts could decide that one parent's relationship is impermissible since it would validate a domestic legal union other than heterosexual marriage. As with the other protections in question it seemed that the courts would have to decide what the actual interpretation and implementation will be in this area.

Other areas of protection that were under question included hospital visitation, emergency medicals decisions, and disposition of deceased partner's remains. Although there are legal documents that can help protect medical and financial security (power of attorney, living will, medical power of attorney), these could have been contested in court based on the argument that they recognize a domestic legal union between the two parties. Issues in estate planning could have arisen through increased litigation contesting wills of unmarried individuals, particularly those in same-sex relationships. Again, the courts could have ruled that any recognition of a domestic legal union between unmarried partners would be unconstitutional and therefore rule those wills and trusts invalid.

=== Economics ===
In addition to legal implications, there were concerns that the amendment would harm economic development and vitality. Some felt that business's employee recruitment and retention would be hurt if the most talented prospects did not feel that North Carolina was progressive or representative of their beliefs. Many Fortune 500 companies have implemented policies protecting employees against discrimination based on sexual orientation, which would not be affected by such legislation.

=== Public knowledge ===
An April 2012 Public Policy Polling found that only 40% of North Carolina voters actually knew that Amendment 1 bans both same-sex marriage and civil unions, and among those voters who do know the effects of Amendment 1, they opposed it with 60% against and 38% in favor. Among the 27% of voters who thought Amendment 1 banned same-sex marriage only, they supported it with 72% in favor and 27% against, and with voters who didn't know what Amendment 1 did, they supported it with 64% in favor and 28% against. Among North Carolina voters who were informed about the effects Amendment 1 banning same-sex marriage and civil unions and then asked how they would vote, only 38% continued to support it, 46% against it, and 16% were unsure. When combined those who do and don't know the effects of Amendment 1 it found that 55% would vote for it, 41% would vote against, and 4% were unsure. It also found that 55% of North Carolina voters support legal recognition of same-sex couples with 27% supporting same-sex marriage, 28% supporting civil unions, 41% oppose any legal recognition of same-sex couples, and 4% were unsure. When asked what the effects of Amendment 1 would be, 40% of voters thought that Amendment 1 banned same-sex marriage and civil unions, 27% thought it banned same-sex marriage only, 26% were unsure, and 7% thought it legalized same-sex marriage.

== Election spending ==
The campaigns were fueled by more than $1,000,000 in spending by the pro-amendment coalition Vote For Marriage NC and $2,000,000 in spending by the anti-amendment group Coalition to Protect North Carolina Families. Big donors, making more than $10,000 contributions, were the main source of funds. The Human Rights Campaign, a pro-gay rights group, gave more than $256,000 to the Coalition to Protect NC Families while the National Organization for Marriage (NOM) contributed more than $427,000 to Vote For Marriage NC.

== Pre-decision opinion polls ==
Date of opinion poll	Conducted by	Sample size	In favor	Against	Undecided	Margin	Margin of Error	Source
May 5 – 6, 2012	Public Policy Polling	1,026 likely primary voters	55%	39%	6%	16% pro	±3.1%	
April 27 – 29, 2012	Public Policy Polling	982 registered voters	55%	41%	4%	14% pro	±3.1%	
April 20 – 22, 2012	Public Policy Polling	1,139 registered voters	54%	40%	6%	14% pro	±2.9%	
March 26 – 29, 2012	Elon University Poll	534 adults	31.9%	61.2%	6.9%	29.3% con	4.24%	
March 23 – 25, 2012	Public Policy Polling	1,191 likely primary voters	58%	38%	8%	20% pro	±2.8%	
February 27 – 28, 2012	National Research, Inc.	600 registered voters	64%	30%	6%	34% pro	±4%	
February 26 – March 1, 2012	Elon University Poll	534 adults	37.8%	54.2%	7.9%	16.4% con	3.98%	
January 5 – 8, 2012	Public Policy Polling	780 registered voters	56%	34%	10%	22% pro	±3.5%	
December 1 – 4, 2011	Public Policy Polling	865 registered voters	58%	32%	10%	26% pro	±3.3%	
October 27 – 31, 2011	Public Policy Polling	615 registered voters	59%	35%	6%	24% pro	±4%	
September 30 – October 3, 2011	Public Policy Polling	671 likely primary voters	61%	34%	5%	27% pro	±4.26%	
September 1 – 4, 2011	Public Policy Polling	520 voters	30%	55%	15%	15% con	±4.3%	

Same-sex marriage only constitutional ban polling

Date of opinion poll	Conducted by	Sample size	In favor	Against	Undecided	Margin	Margin of Error	Source
October 31 – November 2, 2011	Elon University Poll	529 adults	36.5%	57%	6.5%	20.5% con	±4.26%	
September 25 – 29, 2011	Elon University Poll	594 adults	39.1%	55.7%	5.1%	16.6% con	±4.02%	
August 15 – 16, 2011	National Research, Inc.	400 unaffiliated general election voters	49%	43%	7%	6% pro	±4.9%	
February 20 – 24, 2011	Elon University Poll	467 adults	37.9%	55.8%	5.9%	17.9% con	±4.6%	
August 16 – 18, 2010	National Research, Inc.	400 unaffiliated likely general election voters	50%	43%	7%	7% pro	±4.9%	
October 15 – 19, 2009	Elon University Poll	620 adults	43.3%	50.4%	6.2%	7% con	±7.1%	

Nate Silver predicted Amendment 1 would likely pass. His 2011 model, based on past results of past support for constitutional bans on same-sex unions based on religious participation in each state and whether the amendment would additionally ban civil unions, found support for a hypothetical constitutional ban on same-sex marriage and civil unions in North Carolina during the 2012 United States elections would be a clear favorite to pass in the accelerated model at 53.4%, which treats increasing support of same-sex marriage at a faster rate due to a particularly sharp increase in support for same-sex marriage in national polls in the past three years, and overwhelming favorite to pass in the linear model, which treat increasing support for same-sex marriage as slow, at 59.5%.

Nate found an amendment banning same-sex marriage only in North Carolina would be an overwhelming favorite to pass, according to both the accelerated model at 60.4% and the linear model at 66.1%. He also stated that there was uncertainty in statistical modelling due to different conditions in each state. He also found that constitutional amendments banning same-sex marriage and civil unions perform on average about 7% worse at the voting booth than amendments banning same-sex marriage alone. Polling from September 2011 to May 2012 put support of same-sex marriage between 30 and 35%. Nate's 2013 model projected North Carolina's support for a hypothetical same-sex marriage ballot measure would be at 34.2% in 2008 and 40.2% in 2012.

== Results ==
Amendment 1
Choice	Votes	%
For	1,317,178	61.04
Against	840,802	38.96
Total	2,157,980	100.00
Registered voters/turnout	6,296,759	34.66

On May 8, 2012, at 7:30 pm ET the polls closed. At 9:11 pm ET, with 30 percent of the precincts reporting, 43 percent of the vote against and 57 percent of voters approve of the Amendment 1. At 9:15 pm ET, the Associated Press projected, with 35 percent of the vote counted and 58 percent of those casting ballots voted in favor of the amendment, that Amendment 1 had passed.

Of the 100 counties of North Carolina, only Buncombe (home to Asheville), Orange (home to Chapel Hill), Durham (home to the city of Durham), Wake (home to Raleigh), Mecklenburg (home to Charlotte), Chatham, Watauga (home to Boone and Appalachian State University), and Dare voted against Amendment 1. Of the eight counties that voted against Amendment 1, six of them would vote for Barack Obama in the 2012 election, while Watauga County and Dare County voted for Mitt Romney.

== Timing of the ballot ==
The vote on Amendment 1 was held during the lower-turnout North Carolina primary election rather than during a general election when voter turnout is typically higher. Furthermore, whereas the Republican primary was an active contest, the Democratic primary was effectively uncontested and thus had an even further reduced turnout of the Democratic electorate relative to what might have occurred in a hotly contested primary.

Jessica Jones, of North Carolina Public Radio, stated that white women and white Republican men were the two largest groups of early voters in the 2012 North Carolina primary compared to the 2008 North Carolina primary. Voter turn out for North Carolina Amendment 1 was at 34.27%, which is 0.39% lower than overall turnout in the 2012 North Carolina primary, 2.59% lower than the 2008 North Carolina primary and 34.13% lower than the 2012 North Carolina general election.

== Response by President Barack Obama ==
The day after Amendment 1 passed its public vote, US President Barack Obama expressed disappointment in the outcome and announced his support for same-sex marriage.

== Legal challenges ==
On July 28, 2014, the U.S. Court of Appeals for the 4th Circuit affirmed a lower court ruling in Virginia in favor of the freedom to marry, declaring that banning same-sex couples from marriage is unconstitutional under the U.S. Constitution. The decision affirmed the February 13 ruling from U.S. District Court Judge Arenda Wright Allen in Bostic v. Schaefer, in which same-sex couples sought the freedom to marry and respect for their marriages legally performed in other states. On October 6, the United States Supreme Court denied review of this case, meaning that same-sex couples would have the freedom to marry in Virginia.

Since the 4th Circuit also covers Maryland, West Virginia, North and South Carolina, the decision by the Supreme Court to refuse review meant the 4th Circuit decision stood as case law in the other states. With the exception of Maryland, where same-sex marriage was already legal, court cases were promptly filed to strike down various state laws and amendments.

Shortly after 5 p.m. on October 10, 2014, U.S. District Court Judge Max O. Cogburn, Jr. in Asheville issued a ruling in the case of General Synod of the United Church of Christ, et al. v. Drew Reisinger, Register of Deeds of Buncombe County, declaring the amendment unconstitutional, and also declaring unconstitutional "and any other source of state law that operates to deny same-sex couples the right to marry in the State of North Carolina or prohibits recognition of same-sex marriages lawfully solemnized in other States, Territories, or a District of the United States, or threatens clergy or other officiants who solemnize the union of same-sex couples with civil or criminal penalties".

Chris Sgro, executive director of Equality NC, an LGBT rights advocacy organization in North Carolina, said "Today's ruling allowing loving, same-sex couples to marry across North Carolina is a historic moment for our state", and said that "With it, we celebrate with so many North Carolinians who have worked tirelessly over decades to change hearts, minds, and unequal laws in the state we call home. Love won and the barriers to it are done."

Shortly after Cogburn's ruling, the Registers of Deeds in several North Carolina counties reopened (or had previously extended hours in anticipation of the ruling) to issue marriage certificates to same-sex couples that had been waiting for several days.

== See also ==
- North Carolina General Assembly of 2011–2012
- Recognition of same-sex unions in North Carolina
- Constitution of North Carolina
