= Same-sex marriage in North Carolina =

Same-sex marriage has been legally recognized in North Carolina since October 10, 2014, when a U.S. District Court judge ruled in General Synod of the United Church of Christ v. Cooper that the state's denial of marriage rights to same-sex couples was unconstitutional. Governor Pat McCrory and Attorney General Roy Cooper had acknowledged that a recent ruling in the Fourth Circuit Court of Appeals and the U.S. Supreme Court's decision not to hear an appeal in that case had established the unconstitutionality of North Carolina's ban on same-sex marriage. State legislators sought without success to intervene in lawsuits to defend the state's ban on same-sex marriage. On October 10, Judge Max O. Cogburn Jr. of the U.S. District Court for the Western District of North Carolina ruled in General Synod of the United Church of Christ that the ban violated the U.S. Constitution, making North Carolina the 28th U.S. state to legalize same-sex marriage. Polling suggests that a majority of North Carolina residents support the legal recognition of same-sex marriage.

North Carolina had previously denied marriage rights to same-sex couples by statute since 1996. A constitutional amendment that was approved in 2012 reinforced this by defining marriage between "a man and a woman" as the only valid "domestic legal union" in the state and denying recognition to any similar legal status, such as civil unions. The defunct amendment remains in the Constitution of North Carolina, and can only be repealed with another amendment that must be passed by both chambers of the General Assembly with a three-fifths vote and by voters in a referendum. On July 12, 2017, same-sex marriage was codified in state statutes regarding statutory construction.

== Legal history ==
=== Restrictions ===
==== Statutes ====
On June 18, 1996, the North Carolina Senate passed a bill banning same-sex marriage and the recognition of same-sex marriages performed out of state by a vote of 41–4. That same day, the House of Representatives voted 98–10 in favor of the bill. It was ratified by Governor Jim Hunt, and went into effect on June 20, 1996. The law was passed the same year as the federal Defense of Marriage Act (DOMA; Cherokee: ᏗᏨᏍᏗ ᎤᎵᏍᏕᎸᏗ ᏗᎧᏃᏩᏛᏍᏗ, Dichvsdi Ulisdelvdi Dikanowadvsdi), which banned federal recognition of same-sex marriages. In 2025, representatives Deb Butler, Phil Rubin, Jordan Lopez and Mary Gardner Belk introduced legislation to amend the marriage statutes and repeal the ban on same-sex marriages. "In North Carolina, we must defend the rights of our LGBTQ+ citizens. Marriage equality is a settled issue for the vast majority of Americans, and our state should reflect that reality. These bills are about ensuring dignity, security, and legal protection for all families in the face of uncertainty at the federal level," said Butler. The bill died without a vote.

Prenuptial agreements for same-sex couples are codified in North Carolina state statutes and state judicial legal precedent. Statutes also cover terminations in post-separation support or alimony when a dependent same-sex spouse engages in cohabitation. On May 11, 1995, the House of Representatives passed a bill that added to statutes pertaining to alimony that "if a dependent spouse that receives postseparation support or alimony from a supporting spouse under a judgment or order of a North Carolina court remarries or engages in cohabitation, the postseparation support or alimony shall terminate." Cohabitation was defined as "the act of two adults dwelling together continuously and habitually in a private heterosexual relationship, even if this relationship is not solemnized by marriage, or a private homosexual relationship." The Senate passed the legislation on June 14, 1995. The bill was ratified by Governor Hunt on June 21, and came into force on October 1, 1995.

==== Constitution ====
Between 2004 and 2011, bills were introduced every year in the North Carolina General Assembly to implement a legislatively-referred constitutional amendment prohibiting same-sex marriage in the Constitution of North Carolina. Until 2011, all these bills died in committee without a vote. After the 2010 elections, Republicans gained control of both the House of Representatives and the Senate for the first time since 1870. On September 12, 2011, Senate Bill 514, a legislatively-referred constitutional amendment to prohibit same-sex marriage and any "domestic legal union", passed the House by a vote of 75–42. The bill passed the three-fifths threshold (72 votes) in the House with the support of 10 Democrats. Authors of the amendment decided to place it on the May 2012 primary ballot rather than the November 2012 general election ballot. According to reporter Kim Severson, the change from the November to the May ballot was made due to the fact that Republican presidential primaries would be held that same date, ensuring a high voter turnout for Republicans, a group of voters traditionally opposed to same-sex marriage. On September 13, the Senate voted 30–16 in favor of the measure. On May 8, 2012, North Carolina voters approved Amendment 1 by a vote of 61.04% to 38.96%. The amendment added to Section XIV of the Constitution of North Carolina:

Marriage between one man and one woman is the only domestic legal union that shall be valid or recognized in this State. This section does not prohibit a private party from entering into contracts with another private party; nor does this section prohibit courts from adjudicating the rights of private parties pursuant to such contracts.

North Carolina was the 30th U.S. state, and the last in the Southeastern United States, to adopt a constitutional amendment defining marriage so as to exclude same-sex couples. The amendment took effect on May 23, 2012. On October 10, 2014, it was ruled unconstitutional in General Synod of the United Church of Christ v. Cooper. However, the defunct unconstitutional constitutional amendment remains on the books. In order for it to be repealed, another amendment would require approval by a three-fifths vote in the House of Representatives and the Senate, and majority approval by voters in a referendum. In 2025, 31 Democratic lawmakers introduced unsuccessful legislation to repeal the constitutional ban.

=== Lawsuits ===
Same-sex marriage in the United States

==== Mullinax v. Covington ====
On March 22, 2004, Richard Mullinax and Perry Pike, a same-sex couple from Durham, filed a lawsuit against county officials, arguing that Durham County must issue them a marriage license. Officials filed a motion to dismiss the lawsuit. The case was heard and dismissed without prejudice on May 10, 2004, by a district court judge.

==== Fisher-Borne v. Smith and Gerber v. Cooper ====
On June 13, 2012, six same-sex couples filed a federal lawsuit, Fisher-Borne v. Smith, that initially sought the right to obtain stepchild adoptions. In July 2013, following the June U.S. Supreme Court decision in United States v. Windsor, they amended their suit to challenge the constitutionality of the state's denial of marriage rights to same-sex couples. They were represented by the American Civil Liberties Union (ACLU) and private attorneys. Briefing was completed on August 13, 2014. Three same-sex couples filed Gerber v. Cooper in federal court in April 2014 seeking North Carolina's recognition of their marriages, which were established in other jurisdictions. They were represented by the ACLU and private attorneys, with briefing completed on August 13, 2014. Proceedings in both cases were stayed pending the outcome of a Virginia case, Bostic v. Schaefer. The U.S. Supreme Court declined the appeal in that case on October 6, 2014, leaving the Fourth Circuit Court of Appeals' decision, which found Virginia's ban on same-sex marriage unconstitutional, as binding precedent on courts in North Carolina. On July 28, after the Fourth Circuit's ruling in Bostic, the North Carolina Attorney General, Roy Cooper, had announced that he would no longer defend the state's ban on same-sex marriage. He said that because all judges in North Carolina were bound by the Fourth Circuit's precedent, "today we know our law will almost surely be overturned as well. Simply put, it's time to stop making arguments we will lose and instead move forward knowing the ultimate resolution will likely come from the United States Supreme Court."

On October 8, 2014, Judge William Osteen of the U.S. District Court for the Middle District of North Carolina lifted the stays and invited plaintiffs' attorneys to present the court with a motion to rule North Carolina's ban on same-sex marriage unconstitutional. The plaintiffs in both cases filed a joint motion asking the court to issue such an order. They modeled their suggested language on the order issued in Bostic. On October 9, two leaders of the North Carolina General Assembly, Thom Tillis, the Speaker of the House of Representatives, and Phil Berger, the President pro tempore of the Senate, asked to be allowed to intervene to defend the state's ban. Their filing said: "This intervention is about ensuring that the choice made by North Carolina voters receives its day in Court." They contended that "because Bostic was based in part on outcome-determinative concessions made by the Virginia Attorney General that have not been made in this litigation, Bostic does not control." If the district court determined that Bostic controlled the decision in these cases, they proposed to pursue appeals of that judgment to the Fourth Circuit, the Fourth Circuit en banc, and the U.S. Supreme Court. On October 14, Judge Osteen allowed them to intervene solely to preserve their right to appeal. He ruled for the plaintiffs the same day. He found Bostic controlling since North Carolina's and Virginia's bans were virtually identical, held North Carolina's ban unconstitutional, and enjoined the state from enforcing its ban on same-sex marriage.

On December 16, the Fourth Circuit consolidated these cases and put proceedings on hold pending action by the U.S. Supreme Court on certiorari petitions in Obergefell v. Hodges and related cases. On January 14, 2015, Berger and Tillis petitioned the U.S. Supreme Court to review the case without waiting for review by the Fourth Circuit Court of Appeals. The Supreme Court ruled on June 26, 2015, that state same-sex marriage bans violate the Due Process and Equal Protection clauses of the Fourteenth Amendment. The decision legalized same-sex marriage nationwide in the United States. Lieutenant Governor Dan Forest condemned the court ruling, saying, "The power grab by a majority of the Supreme Court is a full-on assault on the founding principles of democratic process, federalism, separation of powers, the voice of the people and judicial restraint." Michael Francis Burbidge, the Roman Catholic Bishop of Raleigh, said, "The true definition of marriage cannot be redefined by courts. It remains the permanent union of one man and one woman, oriented to the procreation and raising of children. The Catholic Church, along with many other Christian and religious traditions, will continue our work with regard to this true definition of marriage and to strengthen the moral basis for all such relationships." The ACLU issued the following statement, "The Supreme Court today welcomed same-sex couples fully into the American family. Gay and lesbian couples and our families may be at peace knowing that our simple request to be treated like everyone else – that is, to be able to participate in the dignity of marriage – has finally been granted. Today's historic victory comes on the backs of same-sex couples and advocates who have worked for decades to dismantle harmful stereotypes and unjust laws in the quest for equal treatment." State Representative Larry Hall called it a "victory for equality", and the Mayor of Chapel Hill, Mark Kleinschmidt, called it "a great day for all Americans and for the promise of our democracy". David Price, representing North Carolina's 4th congressional district, said, "I join many of my constituents, some of whom have been waiting for this moment for a long time, in celebrating today's Supreme Court decision, which continues the remarkable progress we have made as a country toward equal rights for all Americans, regardless of sexual orientation or gender identity. I am reminded this morning of the landmark cases of the Civil Rights era, when justice finally won out over long-standing prejudice."

==== General Synod of the United Church of Christ v. Cooper ====
On April 28, 2014, the United Church of Christ, joined by a coalition of Baptists, Lutherans, and Unitarian Universalists, filed a lawsuit, arguing that North Carolina's statute criminalizing the solemnization of a marriage without a valid state license unconstitutionally restricted religious freedom. On June 3, 2014, additional national religious denominations and clergy were added as plaintiffs, including the Alliance of Baptists, the Association of Welcoming and Affirming Baptists, and the Central Conference of American Rabbis in addition to Episcopal, Jewish and Baptist clergy. Dr. Reverend Nancy Petty of the Pullen Memorial Baptist Church, a plaintiff in the case, said, "By preventing our same-sex congregants from forming their own families, the North Carolina ban on same-sex marriage burdens my ability and the ability of my congregation to form a faith community of our choosing consistent with the principles of our faith." Reverend Nancy Allison, a pastor of the Holy Covenant United Church of Christ and another plaintiff, said, "North Carolina judges some of its citizens as unfit for the blessings of God. We reject that notion. […] The sacraments of baptism and communion are open to all. So should all God's children be able to receive marriage." A spokesperson for the Roman Catholic Diocese of Charlotte condemned the lawsuit, saying "This lawsuit does not change the fact that God created men and women differently. The fruits of that difference are marriage and the continuance of the human race through children." Tami Fitzgerald, executive director of the North Carolina Values Coalition, a group that opposes same-sex marriage, said, "[I]t's both ironic and sad that an entire religious denomination and its clergy who purport holding to Christian teachings on marriage would look to the courts to justify their errant beliefs. These individuals are simply revisionists that distort the teaching of Scripture to justify sexual revolution, not marital sanctity." Paul Gallant, a commentator for The News & Observer, issued the following statement, "I find it interesting that right-wing Christians pushed this into law because [same-sex marriage is] ... against their religious beliefs and now left-wing Christians say the law violates their Christian beliefs. How about we leave marriage up to individuals and leave the government out of it? Less government! You would think right wingers would be all for this."

On October 7, the plaintiffs asked for an immediate injunction against the state, citing the Fourth Circuit's ruling in Bostic. On October 10, Judge Max O. Cogburn Jr. of the U.S. District Court for the Western District of North Carolina denied a request by leaders of the General Assembly to be allowed to intervene to defend the state's ban and ruled the state's ban on same-sex marriage unconstitutional. He wrote:

The issue before this court is neither a political issue nor a moral issue. It is legal issue, and it is clear as a matter of what is now settled law in the Fourth Circuit that North Carolina laws prohibiting same-sex marriage, refusing to recognize same-sex marriages originating elsewhere, and/or threatening to penalize those who would solemnize such marriages, are unconstitutional.

The decision legalized same-sex marriage in North Carolina with immediate effect. The first same-sex couple to marry in the state were Chad Biggs and Chris Creech in Raleigh on Friday, October 10. Chris Sgro, executive director of Equality North Carolina, said "Today's ruling allowing loving, same-sex couples to marry across North Carolina is a historic moment for our state. With it, we celebrate with so many North Carolinians who have worked tirelessly over decades to change hearts, minds, and unequal laws in the state we call home. Love won and the barriers to it are done." Governor Pat McCrory said "[his] administration [was] moving forward with the execution of the court's ruling." In Raleigh, Asheville and Greensboro, county offices stayed open late to issue marriage licenses to same-sex couples. Charlotte said it would open its office on Monday, October 13.

==== M.E. v. T.J. ====
In January 2021, the North Carolina Court of Appeals ruled in M.E. v. T.J. that the state statute preventing judges from granting domestic violence protections to same-sex partners was unconstitutional. The ruling was upheld by the North Carolina Supreme Court on March 11, 2022. North Carolina was the only state to deny domestic violence protections to same-sex partners.

=== Developments after legalization ===
==== Codification in state statutes ====
In order to abide by the legal precedent in General Synod of the United Church of Christ, a bill to make technical corrections to state statutes as recommended by the General Statutes Commission was introduced to the General Assembly in 2017. The bill would introduce gender-neutral language in the statutes governing statutory construction. The Senate passed the legislation by a vote of 45 to 2 on June 26, 2017. It passed the House of Representatives by 116 votes to 1 the following day, and was signed into law by Governor McCrory on July 12. It went into effect that same day. State statutes now read:

The words "husband and wife," "wife and husband," "man and wife," "woman and husband," "husband or wife," "wife or husband," "man or wife," "woman or husband," or other terms suggesting two individuals who are then lawfully married to each other shall be construed to include any two individuals who are then lawfully married to each other. [NC Gen Stat § 12-3(16)]

On May 7, 2019, a bill to define "spouses" as "two individuals then legally married to each other" and replace the term "husband and wife" with "spouses" in statutes concerning tenancy by the entirety, on the recommendations of the North Carolina Bar Association, was introduced to the General Assembly. It passed the House on June 16, 2020, and the Senate on June 18 by 47 votes to 0. It was signed into law by Governor Roy Cooper on June 30, 2020, and went into effect that same day. On May 5, 2023, legislation to make technical corrections to the statutes concerning alimony and distribution of marital and divisible property in divorce proceedings, replacing the term "husband or wife" with "one or both spouses", passed the Senate by a vote of 50–0. However, the bill died in a House committee.

==== Religious exemption for magistrates ====
When the decision in General Synod of the United Church of Christ took effect, state officials announced that judges were required to preside at marriage ceremonies of same-sex couples just as they would at those of different-sex couples and that a judge could not claim an exemption on religious grounds. By early November, six judges had resigned citing religious objections. A group of Republican legislators led by Senate President Phil Berger announced plans to sponsor legislation creating a religious exemption for state magistrates who object to participating at same-sex weddings on religious grounds. Such legislation passed the General Assembly in May 2015, though was vetoed by Governor McCrory. On June 3, 2015, the Senate successfully overrode McCrory's veto by a vote of 32–16, reaching the three-fifths majority needed for overriding a veto in the Senate. An override vote was held in the House of Representatives on June 11, 2015, achieving the three-fifths majority required by a margin of 69–41. As a result, the measure became law, making North Carolina the second state after Utah to allow for this sort of religious exemption for state magistrates.

A lawsuit arguing that the exemption was unconstitutional was filed in federal court on December 9, 2015. On June 28, 2017, a three-judge panel of the Fourth Circuit, composed of J. Harvie Wilkinson III, Barbara Milano Keenan and Stephanie Thacker, dismissed the lawsuit because the couples who brought the suit lacked standing as none of them had been turned down by a state magistrate. At the time the lawsuit was filed, roughly 5 percent of magistrates were refusing to marry same-sex couples for religious reasons. This included every magistrate in McDowell County.

==== Attempt to pass unconstitutional legislation ====
On April 11, 2017, three Republicans legislators introduced the Uphold Historical Marriage Act to the General Assembly. (Note: The three sponsors were Larry Pittman, Michael Speciale, and Carl Ford.) The bill sought to reenact the state's same-sex marriage ban, thus being in violation of Obergefell v. Hodges, the U.S. Supreme Court ruling which held that same-sex couples have a nationwide fundamental right to marry. The bill claimed the Supreme Court "overstepped its constitutional bounds". It also quoted the Bible, saying "the ruling exceeds the authority of the court relative to the decree of Almighty God that a man shall leave his father and his mother and hold fast to his wife, and they shall become one flesh". Governor Cooper subsequently announced his opposition to the bill, tweeting "We need more LGBT protections, not fewer." The following day, House Speaker Tim Moore denied the bill a hearing, effectively killing it. Moore said that "there are strong constitutional concerns with this legislation given that the U.S. Supreme Court has firmly ruled on the issue."

== Native American nations ==
The Indian Civil Rights Act, also known as Public Law 90–284 (Cherokee: ᏗᎧᏃᏩᏛᏍᏗ 90–284, Dikanowadvsdi 90–284), primarily aims to protect the rights of Native Americans but also reinforces the principle of tribal self-governance. While it does not grant sovereignty, the Act affirms the authority of tribes to govern their own legal affairs. Consequently, many tribes have enacted their own marriage and family laws. As a result, the General Synod of the United Church of Christ ruling and the Supreme Court's Obergefell ruling did not automatically apply to tribal jurisdictions. Same-sex marriage is not legal on the reservation of the Eastern Band of Cherokee Indians. Tribal law specifies that a marriage "between a man and a woman" is recognized if a license is obtained from a register of deeds in the couple's county of residence or the Cherokee Court. However, tribal law also states that all marriages, which have been solemnized according to the laws of North Carolina or any other state or Native American nation, will be given full faith and credit by the tribe. On December 11, 2014, the Tribal Council passed a resolution reaffirming the wording, ensuring that such marriage ceremonies would not be performed within tribal jurisdiction. Licenses issued to same-sex couples elsewhere continue to be recognized. In September 2021, the Tribal Council voted 3–8 to reject a resolution which would have legalized same-sex marriage on the reservation. The resolution was introduced by Tamara Thompson, a member of the LGBT community. Chelsea Taylor Saunooke, who supported the resolution, said, "She's [her girlfriend] my fiancé. I hope we can get married here. If not. Maybe I can wait for the day to come. But thank you, to those who aren't in support for violating your co-council member's rights."

Native Americans have deep-rooted marriage traditions, placing a strong emphasis on community, family and spiritual connections. Traditional Cherokee marriage ceremonies (ᏗᏨᏍᏗ, dichvsdi) involve exchanges of gifts between spouses, feasting and dancing, and a wrapping of blankets signifying the spouses' joining as one family. As bride price, grooms would bring venison or meat. Monogamy was the norm, though there are examples of polygamous marriages (ᏗᏓᏰᎯ, didayehi) and same-sex cohabitation. Marriages were matrilineal, matrilocal and exogamous, being carefully negotiated and the courtship requiring the approval of both clans. While there are no records of same-sex marriages being performed in Native American cultures in the way they are commonly defined in Western legal systems, many Indigenous communities recognize identities and relationships that may be placed on the LGBT spectrum. Among these are two-spirit individuals—people who embody both masculine and feminine qualities. In some cultures, two-spirit individuals assigned male at birth wear women's clothing and engage in household and artistic work associated with the feminine sphere. Historically, this identity sometimes allowed for unions between two people of the same biological sex. It is likely that Cherokee society had a designation like two-spirit, but a lot of traditional knowledge was lost in the aftermath of colonization and the Trail of Tears for those Cherokee forcibly removed to the Indian Territory. Among the Cherokee, ᎠᏎᎽ ᎤᏓᏅᏙ (asegi udando, pronounced [àse̋ːgĩ́ ùdàntṍ]) refers to people who either fall outside of men's and women's roles or who occupy both men's and women's roles.

== Demographics and marriage statistics ==
Data from the 2000 U.S. census showed that 16,198 same-sex couples were living in North Carolina. By 2005, this had increased to 19,648 couples, likely attributed to same-sex couples' growing willingness to disclose their partnerships on government surveys. Same-sex couples lived in all counties of the state and constituted 0.9% of coupled households and 0.5% of all households in the state. Most couples lived in Mecklenburg, Wake and Guilford counties, but the counties with the highest percentage of same-sex couples were Durham (0.85% of all county households) and Buncombe (0.79%). Same-sex partners in North Carolina were on average younger than opposite-sex partners, and more likely to be employed. However, the average and median household incomes of same-sex couples were lower than different-sex couples, and same-sex couples were also far less likely to own a home than opposite-sex partners. 22% of same-sex couples in North Carolina were raising children under the age of 18, with an estimated 7,437 children living in households headed by same-sex couples in 2005.

The 2020 U.S. census showed that there were 19,169 married same-sex couple households (7,685 male couples and 11,484 female couples) and 15,688 unmarried same-sex couple households in North Carolina.

== Domestic partnerships ==
Map of North Carolina counties and cities offering domestic partnerships City offers domestic partnerships County offers domestic partnerships County or city does not offer domestic partnerships

Some cities and counties in North Carolina recognize domestic partnerships. Registered domestic partners are legally recognized only by the jurisdiction in which they registered. The partnerships allow the extension of health care benefits to employees and their domestic partners. Some cities in the state recognize both same-sex and opposite-sex domestic partnerships. According to 2010 census data, there were 228,000 North Carolina couples in domestic partnerships and 12 percent of those were same-sex couples. In 2008, the General Assembly added a provision to state law, affording hospital visitation rights to same-sex couples though a designated visitor statute.

The first town to establish domestic partnerships was Carrboro in 1994, which permits such partnerships between any two persons who are residents of the town of Carrboro or at least one of whom is an employee of the town of Carrboro. Chapel Hill followed suit in 1995, allowing for the registration of domestic partnerships between any two adults who live together in a long-term relationship of indefinite duration, with an exclusive mutual commitment in which the partners share the necessities of life and are financially interdependent, and who are not married to a third party, do not have another domestic partner and not related by blood more closely than would bar their marriage in the state.

Durham became the first city to allow domestic partnerships in 2003. Durham County did the same later that same year, becoming the first county in the state to do so. In December of that same year, commissioners in Orange County approved a measure to extend benefits to the domestic partners of county employees. Benefits available include dependent health, dental, life, and retiree insurance, funeral leave, sick leave, shared leave and family leave of absence. The estimated cost for one percent of Orange County (or seven employees) to participate in domestic partnerships was $17,000 for the county's contribution. Greensboro began offering domestic partnerships in 2007. The City Council was initially concerned that by offering domestic partner benefits they would be in violation of North Carolina's crime against nature law as well as federal equal protection laws if they offered those benefits to same-sex couples and not unmarried heterosexual couples. Mecklenburg County passed a policy allowing domestic partner benefits for county employees and their partners in December 2009. The approved plan defines "domestic partners" as two people of the same sex in a "spousal like" and "exclusive, mutually committed" relationship in which both "share the necessities of life and are financially interdependent". On February 22, 2011, Asheville authorized the creation of a domestic partnership registry to recognize same-sex relationships, becoming the first city in Western North Carolina to do so. The registry became available on May 2, 2011. Charlotte created its own domestic partnership registry, separate from Mecklenburg County, in 2013. In March 2013, Buncombe County became the fourth North Carolina county to allow domestic partnerships.

== Public opinion ==
Public opinion for same-sex marriage in North Carolina
Poll source	Dates administered	Sample size	Margin of error	Support	Opposition	Do not know / refused
Public Religion Research Institute	March 13 – December 2, 2024	693 adults	?	63%	34%	3%
Public Religion Research Institute	March 9 – December 7, 2023	720 adults	?	65%	34%	1%
Public Religion Research Institute	March 11 – December 14, 2022	?	?	65%	34%	1%
Public Religion Research Institute	March 8 – November 9, 2021	?	?	66%	32%	2%
Public Religion Research Institute	January 7 – December 20, 2020	1,730 adults	?	62%	32%	6%
Public Religion Research Institute	April 5 – December 23, 2017	2,499 adults	?	49%	41%	10%
Public Religion Research Institute	May 18, 2016 – January 10, 2017	3,544 adults	?	49%	40%	11%
Public Religion Research Institute	April 29, 2015 – January 7, 2016	2,855 adults	?	46%	47%	7%
Public Religion Research Institute	April 2, 2014 – January 4, 2015	1,864 adults	?	44%	49%	7%
Elon University	October 21–25, 2014	1,084 adults	± 3.0%	43%	46%	11%
Elon University	October 21–25, 2014	996 registered voters	± 3.1%	42%	47%	11%
Elon University	October 21–25, 2014	687 likely voters	± 3.7%	39%	50%	11%
High Point University	October 21–25, 2014	802 voters	± 3.5%	36%	58%	6%
New York Times/CBS News/YouGov	September 20 – October 1, 2014	2,002 likely voters	± 2.5%	42%	46%	12%
American Insights	September 5–10, 2014	600 registered voters	± 4.0%	46%	46%	8%
American Insights	September 5–10, 2014	459 likely voters	± 4.6%	44%	48%	8%
Elon University	September 5–9, 2014	1,078 adults	± 3.0%	45%	42%	13%
Elon University	September 5–9, 2014	983 registered voters	± 3.1%	45%	42%	13%
Elon University	September 5–9, 2014	629 likely voters	± 3.9%	45%	43%	12%
Elon University	April 25–28, 2014	672 registered voters	± 3.8%	41%	46%	13%
New York Times/Kaiser Family Foundation	April 8–15, 2014	900 registered voters	?	44%	49%	7%
Public Policy Polling	April 3–6, 2014	740 registered voters	± 3.6%	40%	53%	7%
Elon University	February 23–26, 2014	925 registered voters	± 3.2%	40%	51%	9%
Public Religion Research Institute	November 12 – December 18, 2013	165 adults	± 8.9%	47%	48%	5%
Elon University	September 13–16, 2013	701 registered voters	± 3.7%	43%	46%	11%
Elon University	April 5–9, 2013	770 residents	± 3.5%	43%	46%	11%
Public Policy Polling	May 10–13, 2012	666 voters	± 3.8%	34%	58%	8%
Public Policy Polling	May 5–6, 2012	1,026 likely voters	± 3.1%	34%	57%	9%
Public Policy Polling	January 5–8, 2012	780 registered voters	± 3.5%	32%	57%	11%
Public Policy Polling	December 1–4, 2011	865 voters	± 3.3%	30%	57%	13%
Public Policy Polling	October 27–31, 2011	615 registered voters	± 4.0%	35%	59%	6%
Public Policy Polling	September 30 – October 3, 2011	671 likely primary voters	± 4.3%	30%	63%	7%
Public Policy Polling	September 1–4, 2011	520 voters	± 4.3%	31%	61%	8%

== See also ==
- LGBT rights in North Carolina
- Same-sex marriage in the Fourth Circuit
- North Carolina Religious Coalition for Marriage Equality
- Status of same-sex marriage
- Timeline of same-sex marriage
- Same-sex marriage in the United States
