= Amos Quick =

American politician

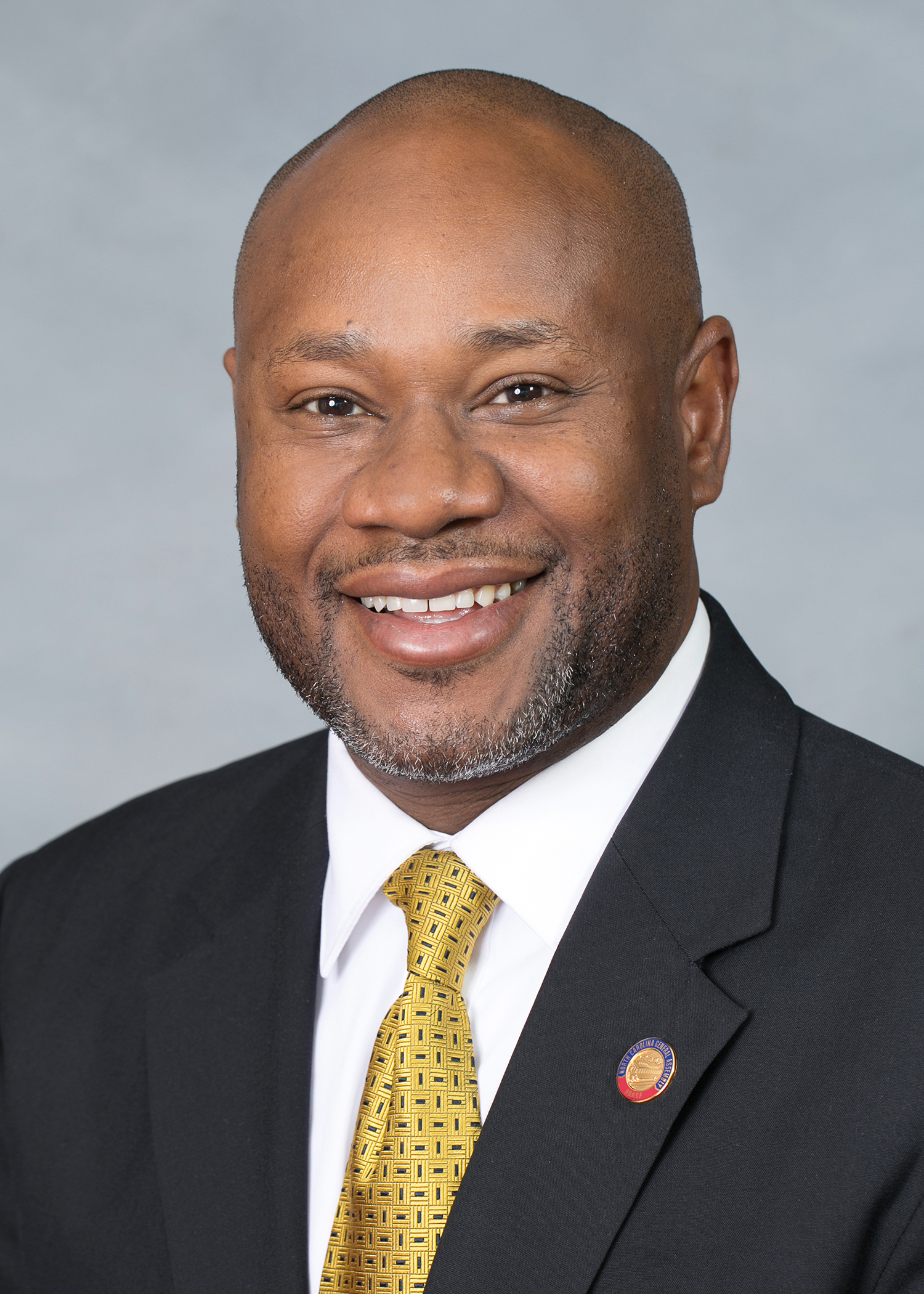

Minority Whip of the North Carolina House of Representatives
- Incumbent
- Assumed office January 1, 2017 Serving with Gloristine Brown and Ya Liu
- Leader: Robert T. Reives, II
- Preceded by: Winkie Wilkins; Susan C. Fisher; Rosa Gill

Member of the North Carolina House of Representatives from the 58th district
- Incumbent
- Assumed office January 1, 2017
- Preceded by: Chris Sgro

Personal details
- Born: Amos Lewis Quick III; August 14, 1968 (age 57) Guilford County, North Carolina, U.S.
- Party: Democratic
- Children: 2
- Education: University of North Carolina, Wilmington
- Occupation: Pastor

Amos Lewis Quick III (born August 14, 1968) is an American politician. He was elected to the North Carolina House of Representatives in 2016. A Democrat, he has represented the 58th district (including constituents in Guilford County) since 2017.

== Electoral history ==
=== 2020 ===
North Carolina House of Representatives 58th district general election, 2020
Party	Candidate	Votes	%
Democratic	Amos Quick (incumbent)	28,943	76.16%
Republican	Clinton Honey	9,060	23.84%
Total votes		38,003	100%
Democratic hold			

=== 2018 ===
North Carolina House of Representatives 58th district Democratic primary election, 2018
Party	Candidate	Votes	%
Democratic	Amos Quick (incumbent)	4,150	80.16%
Democratic	Katelyn (Kate) Flippen	1,027	19.84%
Total votes		5,177	100%

North Carolina House of Representatives 58th district general election, 2018
Party	Candidate	Votes	%
Democratic	Amos Quick (incumbent)	21,385	76.78%
Republican	Peter Boykin	6,467	23.22%
Total votes		27,852	100%
Democratic hold			

=== 2016 ===
North Carolina House of Representatives 58th district Democratic primary election, 2016
Party	Candidate	Votes	%
Democratic	Amos Quick	9,588	71.48%
Democratic	Ralph Johnson (incumbent)	3,826	28.52%
Total votes		13,414	100%

North Carolina House of Representatives 58th district general election, 2016
Party	Candidate	Votes	%
Democratic	Amos Quick	35,176	100%
Total votes		35,176	100%
Democratic hold			

== Committee assignments ==
=== 2021-2022 session ===
- Appropriations
- Appropriations - Agriculture and Natural and Economic Resources
- Environment
- Pensions and Retirement
- Rules, Calendar, and Operations of the House
- State Government

=== 2019-2020 session ===
- Appropriations
- Appropriations - Agriculture and Natural and Economic Resources
- Environment
- Pensions and Retirement
- Rules, Calendar, and Operations of the House
- State and Local Government

=== 2017-2018 session ===
- Appropriations
- Appropriations - Capital
- Commerce and Job Development
- Education - K-12
- Homelessness, Foster Care, and Dependency
- Judiciary III

North Carolina House of Representatives
Preceded by Chris Sgro	Member of the North Carolina House of Representatives from the 58th district 2017-Present	Incumbent
