= Chris Sgro =

American politician from North Carolina

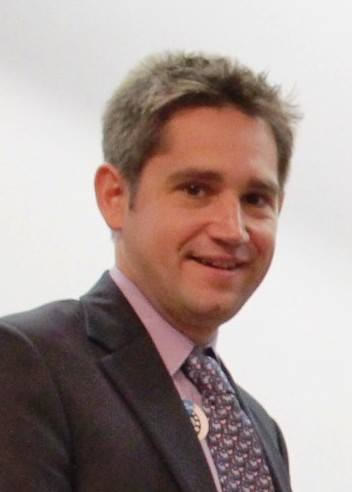

Member of the North Carolina House of Representatives from the 58th district
- In office April 14, 2016 – January 1, 2017
- Preceded by: Ralph Johnson
- Succeeded by: Amos Quick

Personal details
- Born: Jenkintown, Pennsylvania, U.S.
- Party: Democratic
- Spouse: Ryan Butler (m. 2006)
- Education: American University

Christopher Michael Sgro is an American politician and political strategist best known for his work advocating for LGBT rights in North Carolina. He is a former member of the North Carolina House of Representatives and former executive director of Equality North Carolina. In 2017, Sgro became Communications Director of the Human Rights Campaign, the largest LGBT rights organization in the United States, where he later served as Senior Vice President of Communications. He currently works as spokesperson for Meta.

== Early life and early career ==
A native of Jenkintown, Pennsylvania, Sgro was formerly director of economic development for US Senator Kay Hagan and a member of the senator's senior staff, a position which he held for more than four years and which took him to 97 of North Carolina's 100 counties. Prior to that, he was one of the first staffers hired by Hagan to work on her successful 2008 U.S. Senate campaign.

Prior to his work with Hagan, Sgro worked in the Washington, D.C. headquarters for America Votes, a 501 (c)4 organization that aims to coordinate and promote progressive issues, and CARE, a national anti-poverty organization. Additionally, Sgro managed Don Vaughan’s successful N.C. Senate campaign in 2008. Sgro also worked extensively on Jamie Raskin's successful primary bid to defeat the then president pro tem of the Maryland State Senate in 2006.

Sgro lives in Washington, D.C. and is married to Ryan Butler. Sgro met his husband, in a gay and lesbian documentary class, while an undergraduate at American University. The couple had a marriage ceremony in Montreal, Quebec, Canada in 2006, but became legally married in North Carolina on October 10, 2014, where they were the second same-sex couple to receive a marriage license in Guilford County, North Carolina.

== North Carolina General Assembly ==
In 2016, Sgro was selected by Democrats in Guilford County to fill a vacancy in the North Carolina House of Representatives due by the death of Ralph C. Johnson. Because the vacancy was created in a democratically held district, North Carolina law required the Governor to appoint the choice of local democrats. Therefore Governor Pat McCrory officially appointed Sgro to the North Carolina House of Representatives on April 14, 2016, as required by law. He became the first out LGBT person in North Carolina history to be appointed to fill a vacancy in that state's legislature and the first person to serve in North Carolina's legislature who is legally married to a person of same gender.

== Equality NC ==
Sgro was named Executive Director of Equality NC on September 6, 2013.

Equality North Carolina (or Equality NC, or ENC) is the largest lesbian, gay, bisexual and transgender rights advocacy group and political lobbying organization in North Carolina, USA and the oldest statewide LGBT equality organization in the United States.

== House Bill 2 ==
Sgro has been one of the most vocal opponents of North Carolina's HB2, a controversial North Carolina law which he has called "the worst anti-LGBT legislation in the nation." Less than a week after HB2 was passed Sgro held a press conference with other equality groups to announce that Equality NC had filed a federal lawsuit against HB2.

After the passage of HB2, businesses, musicians, and sports leagues reacted swiftly. The NBA canceled the 2017 All-Star Game in Charlotte. Celebrities and musicians like Bruce Springsteen pulled out of scheduled events. Companies like PayPal and Deutsche Bank canceled expansion plans in North Carolina. After the NBA canceled the 2017 All-Star Game in Charlotte, Sgro encountered McCrory as he was walking into a press conference. McCrory shouted at Sgro "congrats, you got what you wanted." Sgro responded “actually, Governor, we all lost - because of you.” Sgro often publicly clashed with former Republican Governor Pat McCrory over the impact of House Bill 2, demanding its full repeal.

On May 11, 2016, Sgro introduced the Equality for All Act, House Bill 1078. The legislation was the most comprehensive set of non-discrimination protections ever introduced in the North Carolina General Assembly. Although it never became law, the bill made national news and brought significant attention to what could be done to advance protections for minorities in North Carolina.

North Carolina House of Representatives
| Preceded by Ralph Johnson | Member of the North Carolina House of Representatives from the 58th district 2016-2017 | Succeeded by Amos Quick |
