= UPAA =

UPAA may refer to:

- Uniform Premarital Agreement Act
- University of the Philippines Alumni Association
- Ureidophenylarsonic acid
- Upaa or Wooper, a generation II Pokémon
- UPA-A, United Pickleball Association of America
