= Equality North Carolina =

American LGBTQ advocacy group

Equality NC
- The Equality NC logo

- U.S. State of North Carolina
- Founded: 1979
- Location: Raleigh, North Carolina
- Region served: North Carolina
- Key people: Kendra Johnson, executive director
- Website: equalitync.org
- Formerly called: North Carolina Human Rights Fund

Equality NC (ENC) is the largest lesbian, gay, bisexual and transgender rights advocacy group and political lobbying organization in North Carolina and is the oldest statewide LGBTQ equality organization in the United States.

== Structure ==
Equality NC is an umbrella group of two separate non-profit corporations and a political action committee: Equality NC Foundation, a 501(c)(3) organization that provides educational programming on LGBT issues and conducts comprehensive campaigns to build public support for equal rights, Equality NC, a 501(c)(4) organization that conducts lobbying and advocacy efforts, and Equality NC PAC, a political action committee which works to elect fair-minded candidates. These organizations all work to secure equal rights and justice for LGBT North Carolinians.

The organization is a member of the Equality Federation.

=== Leadership ===
Equality NC's leadership includes Executive Director Kendra Johnson. Equality NC's work is supported by two boards: the Equality NC Board and the Equality NC Foundation Board. The Equality NC Action Fund PAC governs all PAC activities. All three groups are composed of volunteers from across North Carolina.

The current C4 board members are:

- Candis Cox
- Frank Dorsey
- Elinor Landess
- Mark Tiegel
- Tracey Ward
- Irving Zavaleta Jimenez
- Tika Douthit
- Milan Pham
- Elgin Phillips
- Crystal Richardson

The Current C3 board members are:

- Jenna Beckham
- Ivan Canada
- Robert Dogens
- Ray Mitchell
- Donna Oldham
- Summer Wisdom
- Holning Lau
- Adrian Parra
- Zach Wardle
- Tangela Williams

== History ==
=== Founding and early years ===
Equality NC began in 1979 and originally was called the North Carolina Human Rights Fund. Meanwhile, in 1992, activists, including Mandy Carter and Michael R. Nelson, founded the NC Pride PAC as a response to Sen. Jesse Helms' victory in 1992. The two merged and were named Equality North Carolina in 2002, when the board agreed they needed a parent organization to manage the work and to link all the smaller foundations together.

ENC's Matthew Shephard Memorial Act issued in 1999 became the first pro-gay bill ever voted on in the North Carolina House of Representatives, although it ended up losing by ten votes. In 2004, ENC succeeded in blocking a constitutional amendment prohibiting lesbian and gay marriages. Equality NC PAC also managed to get Senator Julia Boseman, the first openly gay state legislator in North Carolina, elected in 2004.

The organization was successful in getting the 2008 edition of the State Personnel manual to prohibit discrimination based on sexual orientation and gender identity. In the summer of 2007, they petitioned to the state, requesting that it allow lesbians and gays, when hospitalized, to be visited by their partners if they wish. The new permission was approved, and allowed to take effect beginning on May 1, 2008. However, the rule only allows gay partners to visit their loved ones; it does not allow them to make any medical decisions for them.

Equality NC had significant success in passing the North Carolina School Violence Prevention Act in 2009, which protects teachers, students, and school employees from bullying and harassment. The act explicitly includes bullying based on sexual orientation or gender identity, making North Carolina one of a handful of states which particularly singles out bullying based on gender identity.

=== Amendment 1 and House Bill 2 ===
Equality NC was a strong opponent of North Carolina Amendment 1, which banned marriage equality in the state. After Amendment 1 passed, Equality NC responded by hosting a series of town halls all across the state. Amendment 1, along with other bans on same-sex marriage, was struck down in Obergefell v. Hodges.

ENC was also a firm opponent of North Carolina House Bill 2, sometimes called “The bathroom bill.” ENC helped facilitate a strong response to the bill, including boycotts and strong action from the business community. HB2 was eventually partly repealed, with portions expiring in 2020. ENC's response to HB2 however did also highlight some shortcomings in the organization, emphasizing a need to be more grassroots and collaborative.

=== Recent history ===
In its current iteration, Equality NC has evolved from a single-issue focus on LGBTQ rights to a broader social justice organization committed to racial equity. The organization works through an intersectional lens, with the understanding that LGBTQ rights are inextricably linked to other crucial social justice issues, such as racism, economic justice, or immigration justice. As a result, ENC has expanded its work and advocacy, including hiring a new executive director, adopting a new mission statement, and reframing its work.

In 2019, Equality NC lobbied the NC General Assembly to pass a ban on conversion therapy for minors, under the Protect Our Youth NC campaign. Although the legislation didn't pass, they successfully lobbied Gov. Roy Cooper to pass an executive order barring the use of taxpayer dollars to fund conversion therapy. ENC was also able to successfully lobby to expand the kinds of healthcare providers who can provide letters for changing gender markers on driver's licenses, though the current NC policy still doesn't quite reach the organization's preferred policy.

In 2020, the Equality NC PAC endorsed 147 candidates for the general elections, successfully electing 86. This was the most candidates endorsed by the organization in its history, as well as the most successful candidates.

In 2021, Equality NC was successfully able to fend off three anti-trans bills in the NC General Assembly. Additionally, Equality NC successfully launched the #NCisReady campaign in coalition with the Campaign for Southern Equality, pushing for comprehensive non-discrimination laws on the local level. Eight cities and counties have passed ordinances as a result of these efforts.

== Current work ==
Equality North Carolina's mission is: Equality NC builds LGBTQ+ power through advocacy, education, and uplifting the stories of queer and trans North Carolinians in pursuit of racial and social justice.

ENC has a robust education policy program. Housed within this department, Equality NC hosts an annual fellowship called the Rural Youth Empowerment Fellowship. This program provides support for young people in rural areas in executing a social justice project while developing leadership skills. Equality NC also runs two ongoing programs for elected officials, called Out Electeds and Electeds for Equality. These programs work to educate elected officials about LGBTQ issues and cultural competency, as well as provide networking opportunities. Equality NC also has a program called Equality Works, which seeks to improve the status of LGBTQ people in the workplace by providing training to companies about diversity and inclusion.

Equality NC also has used its position in recent years to amplify funding for mutual aid, including funds raised for the QTIPOC survival fund and for Black transgender women in Charlotte.

== See also ==
- LGBT rights in North Carolina
- Same-sex marriage in North Carolina
- List of LGBT rights organizations
