= Ryan Butler =

American politician and filmmaker

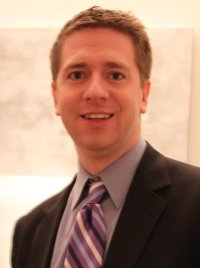
- Born: Ryan Townsend Butler
- Education: University of North Carolina School of the Arts (BFA); American University (JD)
- Occupations: Filmmaker; attorney
- Political party: Democratic
- Spouse: Chris Sgro (m. 2006)
- Website: ryanbutler.net

Ryan Townsend Butler is an American politician and filmmaker. He directed the first documentary about same-sex marriage to air on national television in the United States, is the former president of the LGBT Democrats of North Carolina and is a former member of the Democratic National Committee.

== Political career ==
Butler previously served on the Advisory Neighborhood Commission for Dupont Circle, Washington, D.C. in Ward 2. He was elected on November 7, 2006 with 87.47% of the vote. He was the first President of the LGBT Democrats of North Carolina. In April 2015 Butler was appointed as Chair of the Council of Review of the North Carolina Democratic Party. On February 6, 2016 he was one of five people elected to the Democratic National Committee by the North Carolina Democratic Party’s State Executive Committee, making him a superdelegate. That marked the first time an out LGBT DNC member had ever been elected by the North Carolina Democratic Party.

== Film and legal career ==
Butler's most notable film, A Union in Wait (2001), was an independent documentary film about same-sex marriage which aired on Sundance Channel and screened at more than 20 film festivals worldwide. It was the first documentary about same-sex marriage to air on national television in the United States.

After the release of A Union in Wait, Butler worked as a television editor in Washington, D.C., for ABC 7, the National Geographic Channel, and CNN. In 2008 he moved back to North Carolina, where he worked as in house counsel at Replacements, Ltd. after working for the North Carolina General Assembly and then as an attorney in private practice.
