= LGBTQ rights in North Carolina =

- North Carolina (USA)
- Legal status: Legal since 2003 (Lawrence v. Texas)
- Gender identity: Altering sex on birth certificate does not require sex reassignment surgery
- Discrimination protections: Sexual orientation and gender identity discrimination prohibited in public employment.

Family rights
- Recognition of relationships: Same-sex marriage since 2014
- Adoption: Yes

Lesbian, gay, bisexual, transgender, and queer (LGBTQ) people in the U.S. state of North Carolina may face some legal challenges not experienced by non-LGBTQ residents.

Same-sex sexual activity was decriminalized in North Carolina as a result of the U.S. Supreme Court decision in Lawrence v. Texas, although the state legislature has not repealed its sodomy law. The state has recognized same-sex marriage since October 10, 2014. However, an amendment to a bill prohibiting discrimination against LGBT persons in charter schools has not been signed into law.

== Laws regarding same-sex sexual activity ==
The U.S. Supreme Court ruling in Lawrence v. Texas (2003) held laws criminalizing consensual homosexual activity between adults unconstitutional.

In State v. Whiteley (2005), the North Carolina Court of Appeals ruled that the crime against nature statute, N.C. G.S. § 14-177, is not unconstitutional on its face because it may properly be used to criminalize sexual conduct involving minors, non-consensual or coercive conduct, public conduct, and prostitution.

The state's sodomy law, though unenforceable, has not been repealed.

== Recognition of same-sex relationships ==
=== Marriage ===
North Carolina has recognized same-sex marriages since October 14, 2014, when a federal court decision found the state's denial of marriage rights to same-sex couples unconstitutional. The state formerly banned same-sex marriage and all other types of same-sex unions both by statute and by constitutional amendment until the ban was overturned by a federal court decision.

North Carolina had previously denied marriage rights to same-sex couples by statute since 1996. A state constitutional amendment that was approved in 2012 reinforced that by defining marriage between a man and a woman as the only valid "domestic legal union" in the state and denying recognition to any similar legal status, such as civil unions.

==== Constitutional ban ====
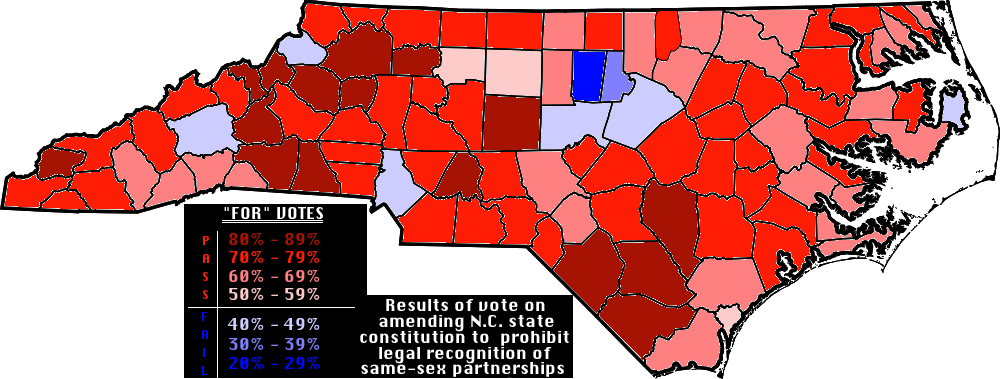
County-level results of the vote on Amendment 1, amending the N.C. state Constitution to ban same-sex marriages and civil unions.

In September 2011, the North Carolina General Assembly passed North Carolina Senate Bill 514 (2011) which put an amendment banning any form of same-sex unions on the primary election ballot in May 2012. The measure passed on a vote of 30–16 in the state Senate and a vote of 74–42 in the state House.

Voters approved the amendment by 61% to 39% on May 8, 2012. North Carolina was the 30th state, and the last of the former Confederate states, to adopt a constitutional amendment banning same-sex marriage. The amendment added to Section XVI of the Constitution of North Carolina:

Marriage between one man and one woman is the only domestic legal union that shall be valid or recognized in this State. This section does not prohibit a private party from entering into contracts with another private party; nor does this section prohibit courts from adjudicating the rights of private parties pursuant to such contracts.

==== Lawsuits ====
General Synod of the United Church of Christ v. Cooper

On April 28, 2014, the United Church of Christ and other religious organizations filed General Synod of the United Church of Christ v. Cooper, arguing that North Carolina's statute that makes it a crime to preside at the solemnization of the marriage of a couple that lacks a valid state marriage license unconstitutionally restricts religious freedom. On October 10, District Court Judge Max O. Cogburn, Jr. ruled the state's ban on same-sex marriage unconstitutional.

Fisher-Borne v. Smith and Gerber v. Cooper

On June 13, 2012, six same-sex couples filed a federal lawsuit, Fisher-Borne v. Smith, that initially sought the right to obtain second-parent adoptions. In July 2013, following the U.S. Supreme Court decision in United States v. Windsor in June, they amended their suit to challenge the constitutionality of the state's denial of marriage rights to same-sex couples. Briefing was completed on August 13, 2014. On April 9, 2014, the American Civil Liberties Union filed Gerber v. Cooper in the United States District Court for the Middle District of North Carolina, seeking state recognition of same-sex marriages established outside of North Carolina. Plaintiffs are three couples: Ginter-Mejia and Esmeralda Mejia, Jane Blackburn and Lyn McCoy, Pearl Berlin and Ellen W. Gerber. A judge has not yet been assigned in this case. On October 14, U.S. District Judge William Osteen ruled for the plaintiffs.

=== Domestic partnership ===
Map of North Carolina counties and cities that offer domestic partner benefits either county-wide or in particular cities. City offers domestic partner benefits County-wide partner benefits through domestic partnership County or city does not offer domestic partner benefits

The counties of Durham, Orange, Mecklenburg, and Buncombe; the cities of Durham, Greensboro, Asheville, and Charlotte; and the towns of Carrboro and Chapel Hill have established domestic partnership registries.

=== Hospital visitation ===
In 2008, the North Carolina General Assembly added a provision to the Patients' Bill of Rights affording hospital visitation rights to same-sex couples though a designated visitor statute.

== Adoption rights ==
Some lower courts allowed second-parent adoptions until the North Carolina Supreme Court ruled 5–2 in 2010 in the case of Boseman v. Jarell that the state law did not permit adoption by a second unmarried person irrespective of the sex of those involved. The plaintiff in that case was Julia Boseman, first openly gay member of the state legislature. On June 13, 2012, 11 same-sex couples sued several state and local officials in federal court seeking second-parent adoption rights. In 2013 they amended their suit to challenge the constitutionality of the state's denial of marriage rights to same-sex couples. On October 14, U.S. District Judge William Osteen ruled for the plaintiffs.

=== Foster parenting ===
In November 2021, it was reported that the Governor of North Carolina Roy Cooper signed a bill into law legally banning discrimination — explicitly listing sexual orientation within foster parenting placements. The law went into effect from January 1, 2022.

== Discrimination protections ==
State law previously banned local municipalities from prohibiting discrimination on the basis of sexual orientation or gender identity in areas other than public employment, but this ban expired on December 1, 2020.

The counties of Buncombe, Mecklenburg, and Orange and the cities of Asheville, Boone, Carrboro, Chapel Hill, Charlotte, Greensboro, Raleigh, and Winston-Salem prohibit discrimination on the basis of sexual orientation and gender identity in local public employment. The counties of Durham and Guilford along with the cities of Bessemer City, Durham, and High Point prohibit local public discrimination on the basis of sexual orientation only.

The University of North Carolina system, which comprises North Carolina's 16 public universities, established a policy of non-discrimination with regard to sexual orientation and gender identity in employment and for students, which is now in partially in conflict with the Public Facilities Privacy & Security Act.

Appalachian State University, Fayetteville State University, North Carolina Agricultural and Technical State University, North Carolina Central University, North Carolina State University, University of North Carolina at Asheville, University of North Carolina at Chapel Hill, University of North Carolina at Charlotte, University of North Carolina at Greensboro, and University of North Carolina at Pembroke have established non-discrimination policies that cover sexual orientation and gender identity in employment and admissions. East Carolina University, University of North Carolina at Wilmington, University of North Carolina School of the Arts, Western Carolina University, and Winston-Salem State University have established non-discrimination policies that cover sexual orientation in employment and admissions. Elizabeth City State University is the only public university in North Carolina that has not established a non-discrimination policy in respect to either sexual orientation or gender identity for employees or students.

The North Carolina Housing Finance Agency has a policy which provides "all employees and applicants for employment with equal employment opportunities, without regard to race, color, religion, creed, gender, sexual orientation, national origin, age, disability, political affiliation, or any other protected status".

On June 26, 2014, the North Carolina House of Representatives passed by a 115–0 vote for an amendment to bill that prohibits discrimination in charter schools on the basis of any "category protected under the United States Constitution or under federal law applicable to the states." The amendment was later removed in the North Carolina State Senate and not included in the final bill signed into law.

On April 12, 2016, North Carolina Governor Pat McCrory signed an Executive Order outlawing LGBT discrimination in any public employment within the state, though it did not impact the controversial HB2 legislation. In October 2017, Governor Roy Cooper extended this discrimination protection to businesses that contract with the state.

=== Public Facilities Privacy & Security Act ===
Passed in March 2016, the law also known as "HB2" prevents local governments from enacting policies contrary to state law in regards to hiring and use of bathroom facilities, and requires all people to use the bathroom of the gender listed on the person's birth certificate. The portion of the law regarding bathroom use based on gender at birth was repealed by the state legislature on March 30, 2017, and signed into law by North Carolina Governor Roy Cooper the very same day.

=== Charlotte ordinance ===
In August 2021, a local ordinance was passed within the city of Charlotte to explicitly outlaw and ban discrimination on the basis of both sexual orientation and gender identity. It goes into legal effect from January 1, 2022.

=== Catholic school case ===
In September 2021, a Catholic school fired a gay teacher back in 2014 and a federal judge ordered that he be reinstated immediately - because legally Catholic schools can't fire gay teachers under federal jurisdiction. This case will possibly be appealed in higher courts (and maybe as far as the Supreme Court of the United States).

=== Wake County ordinance ===
In October 2021, Wake County passed a legal ordinance to explicitly legally ban discrimination on the basis of both sexual orientation and gender identity. About 30% of the North Carolina population is now legally protected from discrimination on the basis of both sexual orientation and gender identity by locally enforced ordinances.

== Hate crime law ==
North Carolina's hate crime statute does not cover sexual orientation or gender identity.

== Domestic violence protection ==
In January 2021, a federal judge struck down the last US state law — North Carolina — that did not recognise same-sex domestic violence. Domestic violence protection laws are now extended to include same-sex couples.

== Conversion therapy ==
On August 3, 2019, the North Carolina Governor Roy Cooper signed an executive order within his office - explicitly banning any state funding of conversion therapy on minors. This is the first time a southern US state has done this.

== Transgender rights ==
On August 16, 2023, the legislature voted to override the governor's veto, and three new laws took effect immediately. They govern:

- requiring educators to notify parents if a student requests that they use a different name or set of pronouns
- trans girls banned playing team sports
- gender-affirming care for transgender minors banned

On July 29, 2025, the legislature voted to override the governor's veto, thereby approving HB 805, which contained a number of laws restricting trans rights, including a legal definition of male and female. As of January 1, 2026, the state officially recognizes male and female as the only two sexes, and disallows using state funds for gender transition care for minors and people in prison.

=== Sports ===
On September 12, 2016, the NCAA announced that it would pull all seven planned championship events out of North Carolina for the 2016–2017 academic year. The NCAA Board of Governors determined that the State's Public Facilities Privacy and Security Act would make ensuring an inclusive atmosphere in the host communities challenging. However, after state lawmakers repealed the bill and replaced it with a less restrictive one, the NCAA announced in April of 2017 that the championship ban on the state had been lifted.

In August 2023, Governor Cooper's veto of House Bill 574 was overridden, which explicitly bans transgender individuals assigned male at birth from participating in female sports and athletic teams within the state.

=== Gender identity documents ===
On June 26, 2022, a federal judge ruled that gender-affirming surgery was no longer required for North Carolina changes to the gender marker on North Carolina birth certificates. This was the result of a lawsuit filed by Lambda Legal in November 2021; the lawsuit had complained that the existing law required "sex reassignment surgery" without defining it.

On July 29, 2025, after Governor Josh Stein vetoed HB 805, the legislature overrode his veto. This requires amended birth certificates to continue to display the person's originally assigned sex along with any change to it.

=== Students and the "Parents' Bill of Rights" ===
Effective August 15, 2023, SB49, known as the Parents' Bill of Rights, was adopted under the guise of fostering increased parental involvement in their children's education and more oversight for educators and their choice of instructional material. The bill includes:

- A ban on instruction of gender identity, sexual activity, or sexuality in grades kindergarten through fourth grade, regardless of whether the information is provided by school personnel or third parties. Curriculum includes the standard course of study and support materials, locally developed curriculum, supplemental instruction, and textbooks and other supplementary materials, but does not include responses to student-initiated questions.
- Required notification of a parent if a child requests to go by a different name or pronoun in school records or by school personnel.
- The right for parents to inspect and object to instructional materials.

=== Gender-affirming healthcare under 18 ban ===
Since August 2023, minors cannot be prescribed puberty blockers or hormone therapy or receive gender-affirming surgery.

== Summary table ==
| Same-sex sexual activity legal | Yes (Since 2003 under the SCOTUS; Not codified into law yet as of 2020) |
| Equal age of consent | Yes |
| Anti-discrimination laws in every area | Yes / No (Both sexual orientation and gender identity within state government employment only — additionally some cities and counties go much further explicitly banning both sexual orientation and gender identity discrimination in all areas by local ordinances) |
| Same-sex marriages | Yes |
| Recognition of same-sex couples | Yes |
| Joint and stepchild adoption recognition by same-sex couples | Yes |
| Protects LGBT students from bullying within schools | Yes |
| Lesbians, gays and bisexuals allowed to serve openly in the military | Yes (Since 2011) |
| Transgender people allowed to serve openly in the military | No (Banned since 2025) |
| Transvestites allowed to serve openly in the military | No |
| Intersex people allowed to serve openly in the military | / Yes (Current DoD policy bans "hermaphrodites" from serving or enlisting in the military) |
| Conversion therapy banned | Yes (Since 2019 from state government funding only) |
| Right to change legal gender | Yes (Does not require sexual reassignment surgery) |
| Third gender option on drivers licenses | No |
| Commercial surrogacy for gay male couples | No |
| MSMs allowed to donate blood | Yes / No (3 months deferral period, federal policy) |

== See also ==
- Law of North Carolina
