= North Carolina's 58th House district =

American legislative district

North Carolina's 58th State House of Representatives district
Representative
| Amos Quick; D–Greensboro |
- Demographics: 24% White; 50% Black; 14% Hispanic; 7% Asian; 1% Other; 3% Multiracial
- Population (2024): 89,464

North Carolina's 58th House district is one of 120 districts in the North Carolina House of Representatives. It has been represented by Democratic Amos Quick since 2017.

== Geography ==
Since 2003, the district has included part of Guilford County. The district overlaps with the 27th and 28th Senate districts.

== District officeholders ==
| Representative | Party | Dates | Notes | Counties |
|---|---|---|---|---|
District created January 1, 1985.
| Ruth Easterling (Charlotte) | Democratic | January 1, 1985 – January 1, 2003 | Redistricted from the 36th district. Redistricted to the 102nd district and retired. | 1985–2003; Part of Mecklenburg County. |
| Alma Adams (Greensboro) | Democratic | January 1, 2003 – November 4, 2014 | Redistricted from the 26th district. Resigned to assume seat in Congress. | 2003–Present; Parts of Guilford County. |
| Vacant | | November 4, 2014 – January 1, 2015 | | 2003–Present; Parts of Guilford County. |
| Ralph Johnson (Greensboro) | Democratic | January 1, 2015 – March 15, 2016 | Lost re-nomination. Died. | 2003–Present; Parts of Guilford County. |
| Vacant | | March 15, 2016 – April 14, 2016 | | 2003–Present; Parts of Guilford County. |
| Chris Sgro (Greensboro) | Democratic | April 14, 2016 – January 1, 2017 | Appointed to finish Johnson's term. Retired. | 2003–Present; Parts of Guilford County. |
| Amos Quick (Greensboro) | Democratic | January 1, 2017 – Present | | 2003–Present; Parts of Guilford County. |

== Election results ==
=== 2024 ===
North Carolina House of Representatives 58th district general election, 2024
| Party | Candidate | Votes | % |
|---|---|---|---|
| Democratic | Amos Quick (incumbent) | 32,379 | 100% |
| Total votes | | 32,379 | 100% |
| Democratic hold | | | |

=== 2022 ===
North Carolina House of Representatives 58th district general election, 2022
| Party | Candidate | Votes | % |
|---|---|---|---|
| Democratic | Amos Quick (incumbent) | 17,217 | 69.16% |
| Republican | Chrissy Smith | 7,679 | 30.84% |
| Total votes | | 24,896 | 100% |
| Democratic hold | | | |

=== 2020 ===
North Carolina House of Representatives 58th district general election, 2020
| Party | Candidate | Votes | % |
|---|---|---|---|
| Democratic | Amos Quick (incumbent) | 28,943 | 76.16% |
| Republican | Clinton Honey | 9,060 | 23.84% |
| Total votes | | 38,003 | 100% |
| Democratic hold | | | |

=== 2018 ===
North Carolina House of Representatives 58th district Democratic primary election, 2018
| Party | Candidate | Votes | % |
|---|---|---|---|
| Democratic | Amos Quick (incumbent) | 4,150 | 80.16% |
| Democratic | Katelyn "Kate" Flippen | 1,027 | 19.84% |
| Total votes | | 5,177 | 100% |

North Carolina House of Representatives 58th district general election, 2018
| Party | Candidate | Votes | % |
|---|---|---|---|
| Democratic | Amos Quick (incumbent) | 21,385 | 76.78% |
| Republican | Peter Boykin | 6,467 | 23.22% |
| Total votes | | 27,852 | 100% |
| Democratic hold | | | |

=== 2016 ===
North Carolina House of Representatives 58th district Democratic primary election, 2016
| Party | Candidate | Votes | % |
|---|---|---|---|
| Democratic | Amos Quick | 9,588 | 71.48% |
| Democratic | Ralph Johnson (incumbent) | 3,826 | 28.52% |
| Total votes | | 13,414 | 100% |

North Carolina House of Representatives 58th district general election, 2016
| Party | Candidate | Votes | % |
|---|---|---|---|
| Democratic | Amos Quick | 35,176 | 100% |
| Total votes | | 35,176 | 100% |
| Democratic hold | | | |

=== 2014 ===
North Carolina House of Representatives 58th district Democratic primary election, 2014
| Party | Candidate | Votes | % |
|---|---|---|---|
| Democratic | Ralph Johnson | 2,889 | 42.57% |
| Democratic | Kerry Graves | 2,047 | 30.16% |
| Democratic | Dan Koenig | 1,540 | 22.69% |
| Democratic | Tigress McDaniel | 311 | 4.58% |
| Total votes | | 6,787 | 100% |

North Carolina House of Representatives 58th district general election, 2014
| Party | Candidate | Votes | % |
|---|---|---|---|
| Democratic | Ralph Johnson | 18,108 | 100% |
| Total votes | | 18,108 | 100% |
| Democratic hold | | | |

=== 2012 ===
North Carolina House of Representatives 58th district general election, 2012
| Party | Candidate | Votes | % |
|---|---|---|---|
| Democratic | Alma Adams (incumbent) | 32,895 | 79.86% |
| Republican | Olga Morgan Wright | 8,294 | 20.14% |
| Total votes | | 41,189 | 100% |
| Democratic hold | | | |

=== 2010 ===
North Carolina House of Representatives 58th district Democratic primary election, 2010
| Party | Candidate | Votes | % |
|---|---|---|---|
| Democratic | Alma Adams (incumbent) | 3,383 | 76.56% |
| Democratic | Ralph Johnson | 1,036 | 23.44% |
| Total votes | | 4,419 | 100% |

North Carolina House of Representatives 58th district general election, 2010
| Party | Candidate | Votes | % |
|---|---|---|---|
| Democratic | Alma Adams (incumbent) | 15,334 | 63.15% |
| Republican | Darin H. Thomas | 8,948 | 36.85% |
| Total votes | | 24,282 | 100% |
| Democratic hold | | | |

=== 2008 ===
North Carolina House of Representatives 58th district general election, 2008
| Party | Candidate | Votes | % |
|---|---|---|---|
| Democratic | Alma Adams (incumbent) | 29,113 | 71.35% |
| Republican | Olga Morgan Wright | 11,690 | 28.65% |
| Total votes | | 40,803 | 100% |
| Democratic hold | | | |

=== 2006 ===
North Carolina House of Representatives 58th district general election, 2006
| Party | Candidate | Votes | % |
|---|---|---|---|
| Democratic | Alma Adams (incumbent) | 10,391 | 65.63% |
| Republican | Olga Morgan Wright | 5,441 | 34.37% |
| Total votes | | 15,832 | 100% |
| Democratic hold | | | |

=== 2004 ===
North Carolina House of Representatives 58th district general election, 2004
| Party | Candidate | Votes | % |
|---|---|---|---|
| Democratic | Alma Adams (incumbent) | 21,087 | 65.73% |
| Republican | Olga Morgan Wright | 10,374 | 32.34% |
| Libertarian | Walter J. Sperko | 618 | 1.93% |
| Total votes | | 32,079 | 100% |
| Democratic hold | | | |

=== 2002 ===
North Carolina House of Representatives 58th district general election, 2002
| Party | Candidate | Votes | % |
|---|---|---|---|
| Democratic | Alma Adams (incumbent) | 14,054 | 85.83% |
| Libertarian | David Williams | 2,320 | 14.17% |
| Total votes | | 16,374 | 100% |
| Democratic hold | | | |

=== 2000 ===
North Carolina House of Representatives 58th district general election, 2000
| Party | Candidate | Votes | % |
|---|---|---|---|
| Democratic | Ruth Easterling (incumbent) | 14,167 | 100% |
| Total votes | | 14,167 | 100% |
| Democratic hold | | | |
