= A Union in Wait =

2001 film

- Directed by: Ryan Butler
- Produced by: Ryan Butler
- Narrated by: Lisa Howes Yewdall
- Cinematography: Richard Clabaugh; Brian Nisbett
- Edited by: Thomas Berndt
- Music by: Jason Schuler
- Distributed by: Frameline, Sundance Channel
- Release date: April 12, 2001 (Turin)
- Running time: 45 minutes
- Country: United States
- Language: English
- Budget: $15,000

Susan Parker (right) and Wendy Scott (left) stand in front of Wake Forest University's Wait Chapel in this production still from A Union In Wait.

A Union in Wait is a 2001 American documentary film about same-sex marriage directed by Ryan Butler. It was the first documentary about same-sex marriage to air on national television in the United States.

== Summary ==
Susan Parker and Wendy Scott are members of Wake Forest Baptist Church. In 1997 the couple decided they wanted to have a union ceremony in Wake Forest University's Wait Chapel, but the traditionally Baptist university told them no. Susan Parker, Wendy Scott, their church, and many others joined to fight the school's decision in what would become a controversy that divided a community in North Carolina and made national headlines. Eventually (in 2000) Parker and Scott did have the ceremony at the chapel.

The film includes interviews with Andrew Sullivan, Barney Frank, Robert Knight, Jimmy Creech, Fred Phelps, Candace Gingrich, Wake Forest University students, and local ministers. The film was shot primarily in Winston-Salem, North Carolina, on the campus of Wake Forest University; but portions of the film were shot in Washington, D.C., at the Millennium March on Washington, Family Research Council headquarters, and Andrew Sullivan's house.

== Distribution ==
In 2001, the Sundance Channel licensed the film for television in the United States. A Union In Wait was also shown at numerous festivals around the world and distributed on video by Frameline. In 2015 Amazon Video made the film available online.

== Subsequent developments ==
Susan Parker later served as the associate pastor of Wake Forest Baptist Church. Ryan Butler worked as a television editor in Washington, D.C., after the release of A Union In Wait for WJLA-TV, National Geographic Channel, and CNN. He was also elected to Washington's Advisory Neighborhood Commission. In 2009 he moved back to North Carolina where he worked for the North Carolina General Assembly.
