= North Carolina House Bill 574 =

2023 law in U.S. state

House Bill 574

North Carolina General Assembly
- Long title: AN ACT TO PROTECT OPPORTUNITIES FOR WOMEN AND GIRLS IN ATHLETICS.
- Territorial extent: North Carolina
- Enacted by: North Carolina House of Representatives
- Enacted: April 19, 2023
- Enacted by: North Carolina Senate
- Enacted: June 20, 2023
- Vetoed by: Roy Cooper
- Vetoed: July 5, 2023
- Veto overridden: August 16, 2023
- Effective: August 16, 2023

Legislative history

Initiating chamber: North Carolina House of Representatives
- First reading: April 6, 2023
- Second reading: April 19, 2023
- Voting summary: 73 voted for; 39 voted against; 7 absent; 1 present not voting
- Third reading: April 19, 2023

Revising chamber: North Carolina Senate
- Received from the North Carolina House of Representatives: April 20, 2023
- First reading: April 20, 2023
- Second reading: June 20, 2023
- Voting summary: 31 voted for; 17 voted against; 2 absent
- Third reading: June 20, 2023

Final stages
- Finally passed both chambers: June 26, 2023
- Reconsidered by the North Carolina House of Representatives after veto: August 16, 2023
- Voting summary: 74 voted for; 45 voted against; 1 absent
- Reconsidered by the North Carolina Senate after veto: August 16, 2023
- Voting summary: 27 voted for; 18 voted against; 5 absent

Summary
- Prohibits transgender North Carolinian women from competing in women's sports.
- Status: In force

North Carolina House Bill 574 (HB 574), also known as the Fairness in Women's Sports Act, is a 2023 law in the state of North Carolina that prohibits transgender North Carolinian women from competing in women's K-12 or collegiate sports. It was vetoed by Governor Roy Cooper on July 5, 2023, but was overridden by the North Carolina General Assembly on August 16, becoming law immediately.

Only two transgender girls out of 180,000 student athletes in North Carolina are known to have been approved to compete in women's sports prior to the passage of House Bill 574.

== Provisions ==
House Bill 574 prohibits transgender women from competing in sports in K-12 schools and colleges or universities, applying to both public and private schools. It achieves this by restricting sports to biological sex, instead of gender. Transgender women who compete in sports in states without a similar ban are still allowed to compete in North Carolina.

== Reactions ==
=== Support ===
The Alliance Defending Freedom applauded the legislature for overriding Governor Cooper's veto. State Senator Kevin Corbin, a Republican, referred to it as "common sense."

=== Opposition ===
Equality North Carolina opposed House Bill 574 along with multiple other transgender-related bills, referring to it as the "slate of hate." Governor Cooper stated in reference to the overrides of his vetoes that the bills were "the wrong priorities" and pushed "political culture wars."

== See also ==
- LGBTQ rights in North Carolina
- Transgender people in sports
