= Prenuptial agreement =

Written contract entered into by a couple before marriage or a civil union

A prenuptial agreement, antenuptial agreement, or premarital agreement (commonly referred to as a prenup), is a written contract entered into by a couple before marriage or a civil union that enables them to select and control many of the legal rights they acquire upon marrying, and what happens when their marriage ends by death or divorce. Couples enter into a written prenuptial agreement to supersede many of the default marital laws that would otherwise apply in the event of divorce, such as the laws that govern the division of property, retirement benefits, savings, and the right to seek alimony (spousal support) with agreed-upon terms that provide certainty and clarify their marital rights. A premarital agreement may also contain waivers of a surviving spouse's right to claim an elective share of the estate of the deceased spouse.

In some countries, including the United States, Belgium, and the Netherlands, the prenuptial agreement not only provides for what happens in the event of a divorce but also protects some property during the marriage, for instance in case of bankruptcy. Many countries, including Canada, France, Italy, and Germany, have matrimonial regimes, in addition to, or in some cases, instead of prenuptial agreements.

Postnuptial agreements are similar to prenuptial agreements, except that they are entered into after a couple is married. When divorce is imminent, postnuptial agreements are referred to as separation agreements.

== Legal recognition ==
Laws vary between states and countries in what content they may contain and under what conditions and circumstances a prenuptial agreement may be declared unenforceable, such as an agreement signed under fraud, duress, or without adequate disclosure of assets.

=== Africa ===
==== South Africa ====
In South Africa, a civil marriage or civil union is by default, a marriage in a community of property. To marry out of the community of property, the parties must sign an antenuptial contract in the presence of a notary public before their marriage and the contract must be registered in the Deeds Office within three months from the date of signature of the contract.

When marrying out of the community, the parties have a choice to marry with application of the accrual system or without application of the accrual system.

If the parties marry without accrual, the spouses' respective estates would always remain separate and neither party will have any proprietary claim against the other by the marriage.

If the parties marry with application of the accrual, their respective estates would remain separate during the subsistence of the marriage. Upon dissolution of the marriage, whether by death or divorce, the spouse with the lesser accrual would have a claim against the spouse with the larger accrual for half the difference between their accrual values.

=== Asia ===
==== India ====
In India, prenuptial agreements are very rare and do not have any governing laws. However, with rising divorce rates, people are showing increasing interest in them. Some lawyers think that prenups don't have legal sanctity in India. However, some form of contract is signed in some cases, usually among affluent citizens. But, the agreements need to be reasonable and not violate pre-existing laws like the Hindu Marriage Act. Indian courts allow a memorandum of settlement to be signed during divorces. But, no court has yet been asked to enforce a prenup.

These agreements may come under the Indian Contract Act of 1872. Section 10 of the Indian Contract Act states that agreements are to be considered contracts if they are made with the free consent of the parties. However, Section 23 of the same act states that a contract may be void if they are immoral or against public policy.

Goa is the only Indian state where a prenuptial is legally enforceable, as it follows the Portuguese Civil Code, of 1867. A prenuptial agreement may be signed between the two parties at the time of marriage, stating the regime of ownership. If a prenuptial has not been signed, then the marital property is simply divided equally between the husband and wife.

==== Hong Kong ====
Pre and post-nuptial Agreements in Hong Kong can be of “magnetic importance” in deciding the parties’ claims for ancillary relief. The leading case of SPH v SA in Hong Kong’s highest court, the Court of Final Appeal followed the earlier English Supreme Court decision of Radmacher v Granatino. One of the Judges in Radmacher (Lord Collins) also sat in Hong Kong as an NPJ. (Similarly, the successful leading counsel for Frau Radmacher, Richard Todd QC was also leading counsel for Madame S. in SPH v SA).

==== Thailand ====
The prenuptial agreement in Thailand is concluded by mutual consent of the man and woman who want to marry. Under Thai law, a prenuptial agreement is recognized by the Commercial and Civil Code of Thailand. A valid and enforceable Thai prenuptial agreement legally requires that

- The content of the prenuptial made in Thailand cannot be against the law or good morals;
- Both the prospective husband and wife must understand the content of the prenuptial;
- The prenuptial in Thailand must be made before the marriage, a contract between husband and wife concerning personal and jointly owned property made after the marriage registration (post-nuptial) is void;
- Both the future husband and wife must sign the prenuptial in the presence of at least 2 witnesses and the agreement must be entered into the Marriage Register together with the marriage.

These conditions are found in clause 1466 of the Commercial and Civil Code of Thailand.
Following the laws on Thai marriage, the prenuptial agreement mainly relates to assets and financial implications of marriage and establishes conditions of ownership and management of personal and concrete joint property and potential division of marital assets, if the marriage will be dissolved. The prenuptial agreement also includes a list of each side's assets at the time of the marriage and guarantees, that debts and property before the marriage remain in possession of the initial owner or debtor.

Personal property includes: (Mostly described at clause 1471 of the Commercial and Civil Code of Thailand):

- property owned by spouses before the marriage;
- property for personal use — work instruments, clothes, etc.;
- gifts from third parties or property received through the testament (if it is not indicated in the testament, that property should transfer to joint property of spouses);
- "khongman" — real estate transmitted to the bride which is different from a dowry, or sinsod, which is paid to the parents of the bride.
- a transfer of personal property to another property during marriage will normally remain personal property. Just be careful about real estate as in Thailand, it causes a problem and the conflict of law act explain these.

The joint property includes:

- property acquired at the time of the marriage;
- property received by one of the spouses at the time of the marriage as a gift, if in the document attached to a gift or in the document compiled by the spouse, this property was declared as joint (Marital Assets);
- income acquired from personal property as stated by clause 1474 of the Thai and Commercial Civil Code.

=== Europe ===
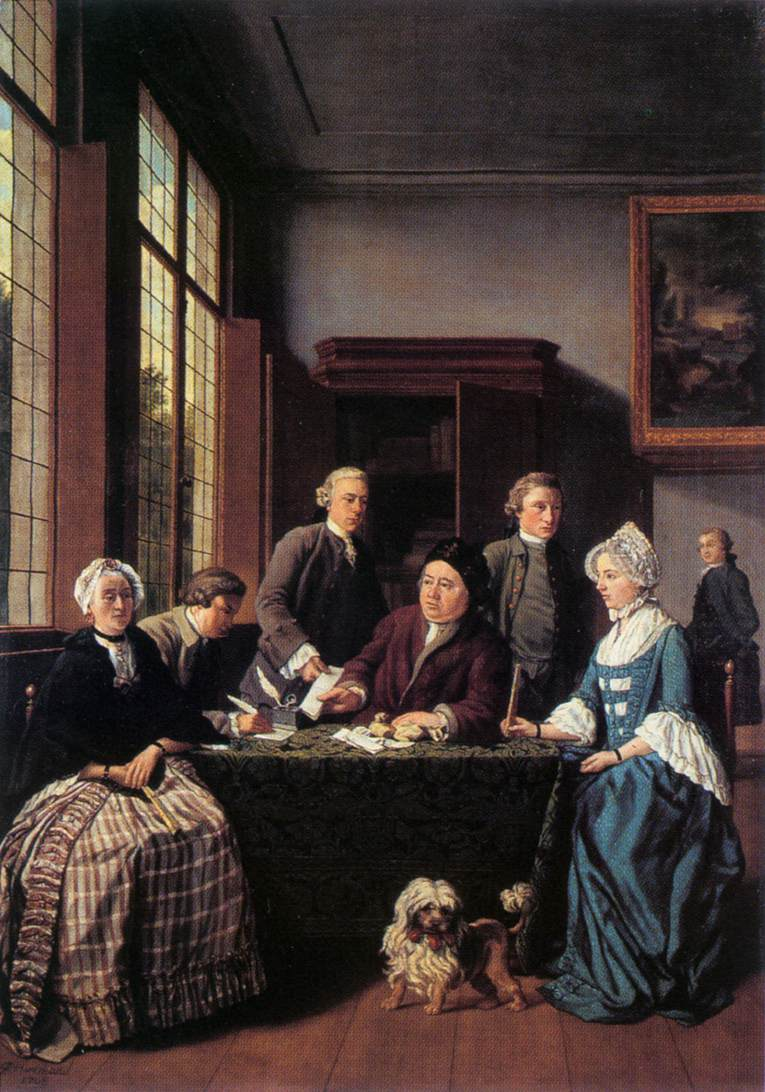
The Marriage Contract by Flemish artist Jan Josef Horemans the Younger c. 1768

Prenuptial agreements have long been recognized as valid in several European countries, such as France, Belgium, the Netherlands, Germany, Poland, Switzerland, Sweden, Denmark, Norway, and Finland. While in some of these countries, there are limits on what restrictions the courts will see as enforceable or valid (e.g. Germany after 2001, where appeals courts have indicated this) a written and properly initiated contract, freely agreed upon, cannot be challenged by, for instance, invoking the circumstances under which the marriage broke down or the conduct of either part. In France, The Netherlands, Belgium and Germany (as in Quebec, which has the same judicial tradition) prenuptial agreements must be set up in the presence of a notary. A notary in the sense of the germanic or romanic judicial tradition is a law professional tasked with translating the signing parties contractual demands into a legally secure document while usually also educating both parties about the legal consequences and possible alternatives of their declaration before signing it. The notary does not represent any party and acts as an independent authority.

In many of the countries mentioned, pre-nuptials may also protect the non-shared property and money from being pulled into bankruptcy and can serve to support lawsuits and settlements during the marriage (for instance if one part has sold or wrongfully mortgaged a piece of property that had been set aside by his/her partner).

==== Ukraine ====
Under provisions of Section 10 of the Family Code of Ukraine, marriage relationships, rights, and duties of spouses can be regulated by a marriage contract as well if spouses wish to settle their property relations in another manner than it is provided by the Family Code of Ukraine.

A marriage (prenuptial) contract can be concluded by a woman and a man, who applied for registration of their marriage as well as by spouses. An underaged person, who wants to conclude a marriage contract before registration of the marriage, is to have the signed consent of his/her parent or custodian certified by a notary.

Numerous provisions of this section of the Family Code of Ukraine provide quite extensive requirements regarding the form and contents of the marriage contract and the procedural issues of making the same are regulated by appropriate Instruction of the Ministry of Justice of Ukraine regarding the procedure of notarization of marriage contracts as well as far as notarization is required.

Imperative requirements regarding the content of the marriage contract are provided by clause 93 of the Family Code of Ukraine, which states that the marriage contract governs property relations between spouses, and determines their property rights and duties. A marriage contract can also determine the property rights and duties of spouses as parents but with certain limitations. Personal relations of spouses cannot be regulated by the marriage contract, as well as personal relations between spouses and their children. This rule is also provided by clause 93 of the Family Code of Ukraine. Marriage contracts, which reduce the rights of children and put one of the spouses in a poor material state, are not permitted by the above imperative regulation. Within the framework of the marriage contract, none of the spouses can acquire any immovable property or other property, which requires state registration.

==== United Kingdom ====
A prenuptial agreement is distinct from the historic marriage settlement which was concerned not primarily with the effects of divorce but with the establishment and maintenance of dynastic families, or a divorce settlement entered into by parties in connection with dissolving their marriage.

===== England and Wales =====
Prenuptial agreements historically had not been considered legally enforceable in England and Wales due to a reluctance on the part of the judiciary for public policy reasons.

The 2010 Supreme Court test case of Radmacher v Granatino, overturned the previous legal framework on them to recognise changing societal and judicial views on the personal autonomy of married partners. Pre-nuptial agreements can now be enforced by the courts as part of their discretion in financial settlement cases under section 25 of the Matrimonial Causes Act 1973 so long as the three-stage Radmacher test is met and it is considered fair to do so, keeping in mind the interests of any child of the family. Radmacher holds that the courts will give effect to a nuptial agreement that is freely entered into by each party with a full appreciation of its implications unless in the circumstances prevailing, it would not be fair to hold the parties to their agreement. The case provided substantial amounts of guidance relevant to all nuptial agreement cases that have occurred since 2010.

The Law Commission's 2014 report on Matrimonial Property generally accepted the decision in Radmacher and recommended the creation of a 'qualifying nuptial agreement' regime by Parliament which would create a completely binding pre-nuptial agreement so long as certain requirements were met. The Commission's recommendations have yet to be implemented.

===== Scotland =====
In contrast to the rest of the United Kingdom, prenuptial agreements are generally regarded as being legally enforceable in Scotland.

===== Northern Ireland =====
The legal status of prenuptial agreements in Northern Ireland is similar to that in England and Wales, in that they are generally regarded as not being legally enforceable. However, since the ruling in Radmacher v Granatino, which also applied in Northern Ireland, the judiciary are more likely to hold parties to the terms of such agreements, unless doing so would be obviously unfair.

=== North America ===
==== Canada ====
Prenuptial agreements in Canada are governed by provincial legislation. Each province and territory in Canada recognize prenuptial agreements. For instance, in Ontario, prenuptial agreements are called marriage contracts and they are recognized by section 52 of the Family Law Act.

==== United States ====
In the United States, prenuptial agreements are recognized in all fifty states and the District of Columbia, and they are enforceable if prepared in accordance with state and federal law requirements. The demand for prenuptial agreements in the United States has increased in recent years, particularly among millennial couples. In a 2016 survey conducted by the American Academy of Matrimonial Lawyers (AAML), member attorneys reported seeing an increase, with the strongest interest in protecting increases in the value of the separate property, inheritances, and division of community property.

In the past, couples entered into premarital agreements with a level of uncertainty about their validity. Today, the presumptive validity and enforceability of such agreements in states that have adopted the UPAA/UPMAA including Florida, Virginia, New Jersey, and California, is no longer in question.

Currently, 28 States and the District of Columbia have adopted a version of the Uniform Premarital Agreement Act (UPAA) or the updated Uniform Premarital Agreements Act (UPMAA). The UPAA was passed in 1983 by the Uniform Law Commission (ULC) to promote more uniformity and predictability between state laws relating to these contracts in an increasingly transient society. The UPAA was partly enacted to ensure that a prenup that was validly entered into in one state would be honored by the courts of another state where the couple might get a divorce. The UPMAA was subsequently promulgated in 2012 by the ULC to clarify and modernize inconsistent state laws and create a uniform approach to all prenuptial agreements and postnuptial agreements that:

1. Requires marital agreements to be in writing and declares them to be enforceable without consideration, modernizing existing state laws;
2. Offers couples a flexible framework for premarital agreements that promote responsible planning and informed decision-making; and
3. Provides courts in every state a framework for determining an agreement's validity, regardless of where it was executed.

The laws enacted by states adopting the UPAA/UPMAA do have some variances from state to state, but this framework of laws has certainly made it much easier for legal practitioners to prepare enforceable marital agreements for clients by clearly stating the requirements. For instance, under Florida law, there is a very material difference in what is required to enter into a legally binding prenuptial agreement versus a postnuptial agreement. To validly waive the spousal rights that would ordinarily be available to a surviving spouse under Florida law (such as homestead, elective share, exempt property, family allowance, etc.), the parties have to make a full and fair disclosure of their assets and liabilities to each other before entering into a postnuptial agreement. In contrast, no financial disclosure is required to waive those same spousal rights in a premarital agreement executed before marriage. That said, if the lack of disclosure results in a prenup being unconscionable (unfair to one spouse) under Florida's Uniform Premarital Agreement Act, it may not be enforceable on those grounds.

Even in states that have not enacted the UPAA/UPMAA like New York, duly executed prenuptial agreements are accorded the same presumption of legality as any other contract. A couple signing a prenuptial agreement doesn't need to retain separate attorneys to represent them, as long as each party understands the agreement and signs it voluntarily intending to be bound to its terms. There is a strong public policy favoring parties ordering and deciding their interests through contracts. There are no state or federal laws that force adults with contractual capacity to have to hire legal counsel to be able to enter into a marital contract such as a prenuptial agreement, except for a California law that requires that the parties be represented by counsel if spousal support (alimony) is limited by the agreement. A prenuptial agreement may be challenged if there is evidence that the contract was signed under duress. Whether a premarital agreement was signed under duress must be proven by the facts and circumstances of each case. For example, it has been held that a spouse's claim that she believed that there would be no wedding if she did not sign a prenuptial agreement, where the wedding was only two weeks away and wedding plans had been made, was insufficient to demonstrate duress.

Prenuptial agreements may limit the parties' property and spousal support rights but also guarantee either party the right to seek or receive spousal support up to a certain limit. It may be impossible to set aside a properly drafted and executed prenup. A prenup can dictate not only what happens if the parties divorce, but also what happens when they die. They can act as a contract to make a will and/or eliminate all of one's rights to property, probate homestead, probate allowance, right to take as a predetermined heir, and the right to act as an executor and administrator of one's spouse's estate.

A prenuptial agreement is only valid if it is completed before marriage. After a couple is married, they may draw up a post-nuptial agreement.

In most jurisdictions in the United States, five elements are required for a valid prenuptial agreement:

1. The agreement must be in writing (oral prenups are generally unenforceable);
2. Must be executed voluntarily;
3. Full and/or fair disclosure at the time of execution;
4. The agreement cannot be unconscionable;
5. It must be executed by both parties (not their attorneys) and often notarized and/or witnessed.

There are several ways that a prenuptial agreement can be attacked in court. These include a lack of voluntariness, unconscionability, and a failure to disclose assets. Prenuptial agreements in all U.S. states are not allowed to regulate issues relating to the children of the marriage, in particular, custody and access issues. The reason behind this is that matters involving children must be decided in the children's best interests. However, this is controversial: some people believe that as custody battles are often the worst part of a divorce, couples should be able to settle this in advance.

Courts will not enforce personal lifestyle requirements such as that one person will do all housework. Courts will not enforce, per the prenuptial contract other parental decisions such as the children being raised a certain religion, but may take this agreement into account in regards to future separation agreements. In recent years, some couples have included social media provisions in their prenuptial agreements, setting forth rules as to what is permissible to be posted on social media networks during the marriage, as well as in the event the marriage is dissolved.

A sunset provision may be inserted into a prenuptial agreement, specifying that after a certain amount of time, the agreement will expire. In Maine, for prenuptial agreements executed before October 1, 1993, unless the parties renew the agreement, it automatically lapses after the birth of a child. In other states, a certain number of years of marriage will cause a prenuptial agreement to lapse. In states that have adopted the UPAA (Uniform Premarital Agreement Act), no sunset provision is provided by statute, but one could be privately contracted for. Note that states have different versions of the UPAA.

Unlike all other contract law, consideration is not required, although a minority of courts point to the marriage itself as the consideration. Through a prenup, a spouse can completely waive rights to property, alimony, or inheritance as well as the elective share, and get nothing in return. Choice of law provisions is critical in prenups. Parties to the agreement can elect to have the law of the state they are married in govern both the interpretation of the agreement and how property is divided at the time of divorce. In the absence of a choice of law clause, it is the law of the place the parties divorce, not the law of the state they were married that decides property and support issues.

In drafting an agreement, it is important to recognize that there are two types of state laws that govern divorce – equitable distribution, practiced by 41 states, and community property, practiced in some variation by 9 states. An agreement written in a community property state may not be designed to govern what occurs in an equitable distribution state and vice versa. It may be necessary to retain attorneys in both states to cover the possible eventuality that the parties may live in a state other than the state they were married. Often people have more than one home in different states or they move a lot because of their work so it is important to take that into account in the drafting process.

To financial issues ancillary to divorce, prenuptial agreements are routinely upheld and enforced by courts in virtually all states. There are circumstances in which courts have refused to enforce certain portions/provisions of such agreements. For example, in North Dakota, the divorce courts retain jurisdiction to modify a limitation on the right to seek alimony or spousal support in a premarital agreement if it would cause the spouse who waived such right to need public assistance at the time of divorce. Florida and several other states contain similar limitations to avoid a divorcing spouse from becoming a ward of the state upon divorce under a prenuptial agreement. Moreover, in Florida where the inheritance (elective share) and homestead rights granted to surviving spouses by state law are so strong, its Premarital Agreement Act requires that a waiver of surviving spouse rights outlined in a prenuptial agreement be executed with the same formality as a will to be enforceable (notarized and witnessed by two disinterested parties).

===== Same-sex marriages =====
In 2015, the U.S. Supreme Court granted same-sex marriages the same legal footing as marriage between opposite-gender couples, in the case of Obergefell v. Hodges (decided June 26, 2015). This effect of the Supreme Court's ruling is that a premarital agreement entered into by a same-sex couple in one state is fully enforceable in another state in the event of a divorce.

===== Federal laws =====
Certain federal laws apply to the terms that may be included in a premarital agreement. The Retirement Equity Act (REA) of 1984, signed into law by President Ronald Reagan on August 23, 1984, reconciled confusion over whether ERISA preempted state divorce laws, thereby preventing pension plans from complying with court orders giving a spouse a portion of the worker's pension in a divorce decree. A prenuptial agreement can contain waivers by which each spouse agrees to release any claims against each other's retirement benefits that arise under both state and federal laws by the marriage, like under the REA.

When a United States citizen marries an immigrant, that person frequently serves as a Visa sponsor to petition for their fiancé to enter or stay in the United States. The Dept. of Homeland Security requires people sponsoring their immigrant fiancé to come to the U.S. on a Visa to provide an Affidavit of Support, and it is important to take into account the Affidavit of Support obligation for a U.S. sponsor about to publish a prenuptial agreement. The Affidavit of Support creates a 10-year contract between the U.S. Government and the sponsor, requiring the sponsor to financially support the immigrant fiancé. As the I-864 form states, divorce does not terminate the support obligations the sponsor owes to U.S. Government, and the immigrant spouse has rights as a third-party beneficiary of the support promise the sponsor makes in the I-864 Affidavit. As such, any waiver of alimony in their prenuptial agreement must be drafted in a way that does not violate the contract that the U.S. sponsor makes with the government by providing the Affidavit of Support, or it will be at risk of being declared unenforceable.

===== California =====
In a 1990 California case, the court of appeals enforced an oral prenuptial agreement in the probate of the estate of one of the parties because the surviving spouse had substantially changed her position in reliance on the oral agreement. However, following changes in the statutory law, it has become much more difficult to change the character of a community or separate property without a written agreement.

Parties can waive disclosure beyond that which is provided, and there is no requirement for notarization, but it is good practice. There are special requirements if parties sign the agreement without an attorney, and the parties must have independent counsel if they limit spousal support (also known as alimony or spousal maintenance in other states). Parties must wait seven days after the premarital agreement is first presented for review before they sign it, but there is no requirement that this be done a certain number of days before the marriage. Prenups often take months to negotiate so they should not be left until the last minute (as people often do). If the prenup calls for the payment of a lump sum at the time of divorce, it may be deemed to promote divorce. This concept has come under attack and a lawyer should be consulted to make sure the prenup does not violate this provision.

In California, through a prenuptial agreement, a couple may waive their rights to share property (community property). The agreement can limit spousal support (although a court at the divorce can set this aside if the limitation is unconscionable). The agreement can act as a contract to make a will requiring one spouse to provide for the other at death. It can also limit probate rights at death, such as the right to a probate allowance, the right to act as an executor, the right to take as a predetermined heir, and so forth.

===== North Carolina =====
Prenuptial agreements are codified in the North Carolina Constitution and in Chapter 52B of the North Carolina General Statutes, titled The Uniform Premarital Agreement Act. In the North Carolina Constitution, in ARTICLE XIV MISCELLANEOUS, Sec. 6. Marriage., prenuptial agreements are constitutionally protected.

===== South Carolina =====
Prenuptial agreements are codified in the South Carolina Code of Laws and South Carolina Constitution. In Title 20 - Domestic Relations, CHAPTER 1, Marriage, ARTICLE 1, General Provisions, of the South Carolina Code of Laws, it covers the definitions and enforcement of prenuptial agreements. In the South Carolina Constitution, in ARTICLE XIV MISCELLANEOUS, Sec. 6. Marriage., prenuptial agreements are constitutionally protected. In the South Carolina Constitution, ARTICLE XVII, MISCELLANEOUS MATTERS, SECTION 15., prenuptial agreements are constitutionally protected.

=== Oceania ===
==== Australia ====
Prenuptial agreements are recognised in Australia by the Family Law Act 1975 (Commonwealth). In Australia, a prenuptial agreement is referred to as a Binding Financial Agreement (BFA).

In Australia, a BFA can be entered into before, during or after the end of a de facto relationship or a marriage. For a BFA to be binding and enforceable, both parties must be provided with Independent Legal Advice from a legal practitioner about the effect of the agreement on the rights of that party and about the disadvantages and advantages, at the time that the advice was provided, to that party entering into the BFA.

== Premarital mediation ==
Premarital mediation is an alternative way of creating a prenuptial agreement. In this process, a mediator facilitates an open discussion between the couple about all kinds of marital issues, like expectations about working after children are born and saving and spending styles as well as the traditional premarital discussions about property division and spousal support if the marriage is terminated. The engaged couple makes all of the decisions about what would happen in the event of a separation or divorce with the assistance of the mediator. They then draft either a deal memo or a premarital agreement and have it reviewed by their respective attorneys. An agreement developed via mediation is typically less expensive. After all, fewer hours are spent with attorneys because the couple has made all of the decisions together, rather than one side vs the other.

== By religion ==
=== Christianity ===
In Catholic Christianity, prenuptial agreements are a matter of civil law, so Catholic canon law does not rule them out in principle (for example, to determine how the property would be divided among the children of a prior marriage upon the death of one spouse). In practice, pre-nuptials may run afoul of Church law in several ways. For example, they cannot subject a marriage to a condition concerning the future. The Code of Canon Law provides: "A marriage subject to a condition about the future cannot be contracted validly" (CIC 1102). The Canon Law: Letter and Spirit, a commentary on canon law, explains that a condition may be defined as "a stipulation by which an agreement is made contingent upon the verification or fulfillment of some circumstance or event that is not yet certain". It goes on to state that "any condition concerning the future attached to matrimonial consent renders marriage invalid". For example, a marriage would be invalid if the parties stipulated that they must have children or they have the right to divorce and remarry someone else.

In Lutheran Christianity, The Lutheran Handbook on Marriage stipulates: "Consider a prenuptial agreement, which helps you identify the value of gifts and inheritances you receive, protects you from your partner's pre-marriage debt, and ensures that children from a prior marriage receive."

Independent Fundamental Baptists reflect a perspective that prenuptial agreements are contrary to Christian teaching regarding marriage as a covenant:

...pre-marital agreements tend to undermine the conjugal relationship and place the holy covenant on a wobbly ground from the beginning. God calls man and woman to be united – to live in one, to share freely, to trust and to honor and to love each other in every way. But even the process of creating and executing a pre-nup glorifies a contrary perspective that is destructive and disruptive to marriage. The whole psychology of pre-marital arrangements encourages each spouse to consider himself separated from the other, to be suspicious of the other and to cling firmly to "who is yours" and to preserve him from the other... It's the opposite of unity

=== Islam ===
A Muslim woman may lay down certain conditions in the taqliq (prenuptial agreement) before signing the marriage certificate to safeguard her welfare and rights; the man may do the same.

=== Judaism ===
In Judaism, the ketubah, a prenuptial contract, has long been established as an integral part of the Jewish marriage and is signed and read aloud at the marriage ceremony. It contains the husband's requirement to support his wife by providing her with food, clothing and sex, as well as providing for the wife's support in the case of divorce or the husband's death. However, under this passage, a woman is free to leave if her husband does not provide for her.

In 2004, the High Court of South Africa upheld a cherem against a Johannesburg businessman because he refused to pay his former wife alimony as ordered by The Johannesburg Beth Din.

Recently, a movement supporting an additional prenuptial agreement has emerged in some Modern Orthodox circles. This is in response to a growing number of cases in which the husband refuses to grant gett, a religious divorce. In such matters, the local authorities are unable to intervene, both out of concerns regarding the separation of church and state and because certain halakhic problems would arise. This situation leaves the wife in a state of aginut, in which she is unable to remarry. To remedy this situation, the movement promotes a prenuptial agreement in which the couple agrees to conduct their divorce, should it occur, in a rabbinical court.
