= Ralph C. Johnson =

American politician and businessman from North Carolina

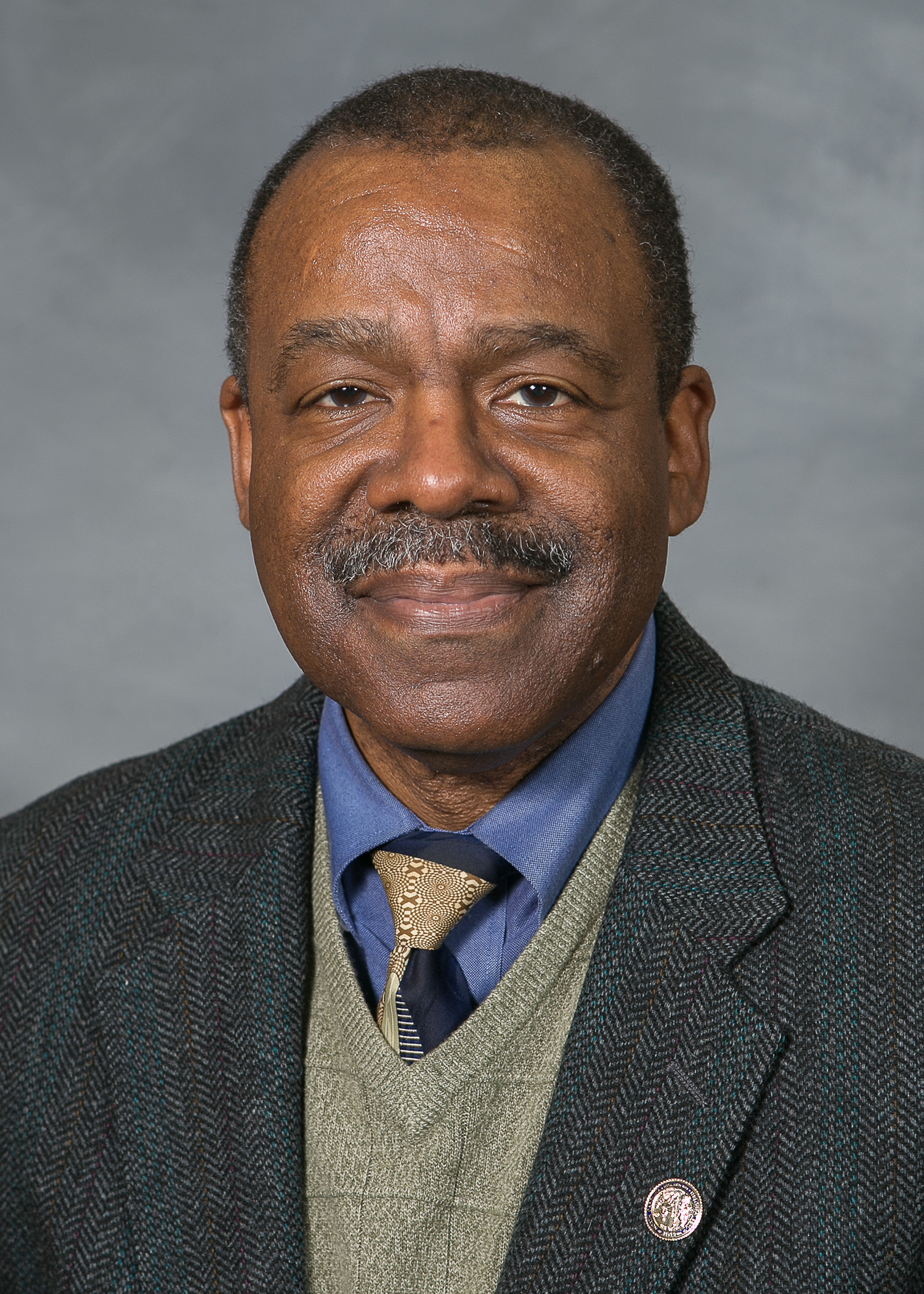

Member of the North Carolina House of Representatives from the 58th district
- In office January 1, 2015 – March 15, 2016
- Preceded by: Alma Adams
- Succeeded by: Chris Sgro

Personal details
- Born: December 17, 1953 New York City, New York, U.S.
- Died: March 15, 2016 (aged 62) Greensboro, North Carolina, U.S.
- Party: Democratic
- Education: North Carolina Agricultural and Technical State University
- Occupation: Home improvement business

Ralph C. Johnson (December 17, 1953 – March 15, 2016) was an American politician and businessman.

Born in New York City, New York, Johnson graduated from North Carolina Agricultural and Technical State University and was in the home improvement business in Greensboro, North Carolina. Johnson served as a Democratic member of the North Carolina House of Representatives from 2015 until his death in 2016. He represented the 58th district. Johnson was African-American. Johnson died in a hospital in Greensboro, North Carolina after suffering a stroke.

North Carolina House of Representatives
Preceded by Alma Adams	Member of the North Carolina House of Representatives from the 58th district 2015-2016	Succeeded by Chris Sgro
