= North Carolina School Violence Prevention Act =

The North Carolina School Violence Prevention Act was enacted by the North Carolina General Assembly in order to protect all North Carolina students, and school employees, from bullying, cyberbullying, and harassment.

The School Violence Prevention Act (SVPA) defines Bullying and harassing behavior as "any pattern of gestures or written, electronic, or verbal communications, or any physical act or any threatening communication, that takes place on school property, at any school-sponsored functions, or on a school bus..."

North Carolina was the first state to enact legislation that protects school employees from bullying by students.

Nationwide youth in schools are experiencing more violent acts and bullying. According to the Youth Risk Behavior Surveillance Report, conducted by the Centers for Disease Control and Prevention (CDC), "...16.6% of students had carried a weapon [to school] (e.g., a gun, knife, or club) on at least 1 day during the 30 days before the survey." The results also indicated that 20.1% of students had been bullied on school property during the 12 months before the survey.

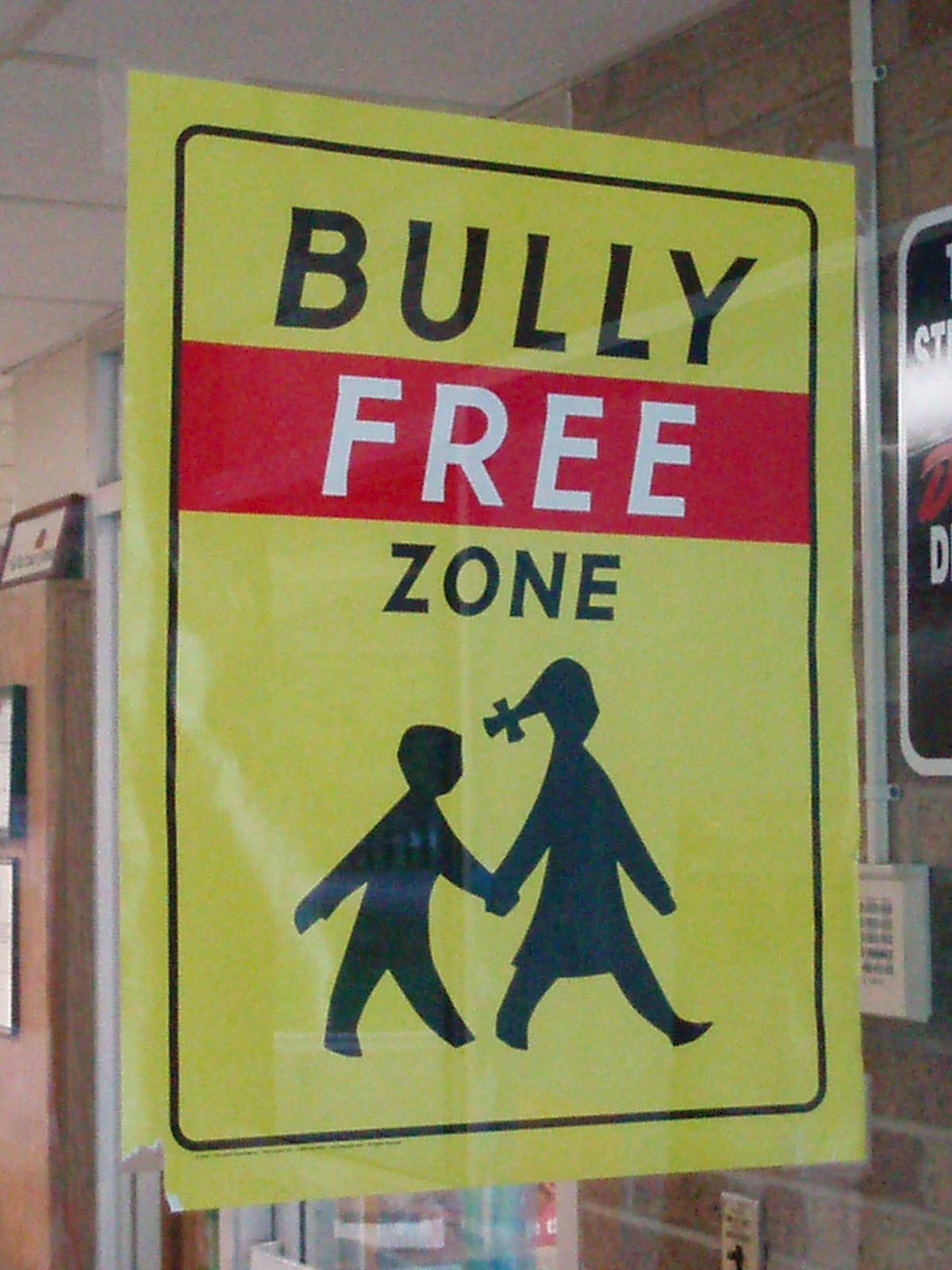
Bully Free Zone

== Legislative history ==
In 2007 a number of North Carolina legislators worked to introduce legislation that would create policies for schools regarding bullying and harassment. This act, known as the School Violence Prevention Act, was proposed in the General Assembly of North Carolina as House Bill 1366 in April 2007. It passed the House but was not approved by the Senate. There was controversy surrounding the bill as the wording described classifications of victims and included sexual orientation and gender identity. Many Republican members opposed the bill due to this classification. When it did not pass the Senate, Rick Glazier (D-Cumberland County), the Representative who originated the Bill, requested it be tabled until the next legislative session.

The NC School Violence Prevention Act was introduced back to the legislature on March 11, 2009, as House Bill 548 and was sponsored by Rick Glazier (D-Cumberland County) and as Senate Bill 526, sponsored by Julia Boseman (D-New Hanover County). This time the Act passed albeit by a narrow margin (58 to 57). It was ratified and signed into law by Governor Beverly Perdue in June 2009.

In 2012 Senator Tommy Tucker (R-Union County) introduced amendments and additions to the act renaming it the North Carolina School Violence Prevention Act of 2012. The Act now includes amendments that address computer related crimes (Article 60, General Statutes 14-453) and Cyberbullying penalties (Article 60, General Statutes 14-458). With the rapid changes in technology the Act was also rewritten to include a new section on Cyber-bullying of school employees by students (Article 60, General Statutes 14-458.2)

== Violence in North Carolina's Public Schools ==
In North Carolina, there were 9,834 reported crimes in public schools in 2016–17. The table here shows the total acts of violence and rates for the last nine years.

According to the NC DPI Consolidated Data Report, the number of reportable crimes by high school students increased by 4%, from 5,774 in 2015–16 to 5,543 in 2016–17. The rate of crimes reported decreased to 12.75 acts per 1000 students in 2015-16 compared to 12.12 acts per 1000 students in 2016-17

The list of Annual Reports - Consolidated Data Reports from 2007–2008 to 2020-2021 can be found here Discipline, ALP and Dropout Annual Reports | NC DPI.

== Specifics of the law ==
This act outlines the way that bullying and harassing behavior should be handled by school personnel.

School Violence Prevention Act

NC General Statutes

Chapter 115 C - Elementary and Secondary Education

Article 29C

=== Statute 115C‑407.15. Bullying and harassing behavior. ===
a "bullying or harassing behavior" is any pattern of gestures or written, electronic, or verbal communications, or any physical act or any threatening communication, that takes place on school property, at any school-sponsored function, or on a school bus, and that:

1 Places a student or school employee in actual and reasonable fear of harm
2 Creates a hostile environment

b No student or school employee shall be subjected to bullying or harassing behavior by school employees or students

c No person shall engage in any act of reprisal or retaliation

d A school employee who has witnessed, or has reliable information about an incident, shall report the incident

e A student or volunteer who has witnessed, or has reliable information about an incident, shall report the incident

=== Statute 115C‑407.16. Policy against bullying or harassing behavior. ===
a Each local school administrative unit shall adopt a policy prohibiting bullying or harassing behavior

b the policy shall contain, at a minimum, the following components:

1 A statement on prohibiting bullying or harassing behavior
2 A definition of bullying or harassing behavior
3 A description of the type of behavior expected for each student and school employee
4 Consequences and appropriate remedial action
5 A procedure for reporting an act of bullying or harassment
6 A procedure for prompt investigation of reports of serious violations and complaints
7 A statement that prohibits reprisal or retaliation against any person who reports an act of bullying or harassment
8 A statement of how the policy is to be disseminated and publicized

c local school administrators can adopt a policy that includes components beyond the minimum components

d notice of the local policy shall appear in any school unit publication that sets forth the comprehensive rules, procedures, and standards of conduct for schools within the school unit and in any student and school employee handbook

e Information regarding the local policy against bullying or harassing behavior shall be incorporated into a school's employee training program

f to the extent funds are appropriated for these purposes, a local school administrative unit shall provide training on the local policy to school employees and volunteers who have significant contact with students

== North Carolina laws and regulations cover bullying ==
North Carolina General Statute § 14-35. Hazing; definition and punishment

North Carolina General Statute §14-458.1. Cyber-bullying; penalty

North Carolina General Statute §14-458.2. Cyber-bullying of school employee by student; penalty

North Carolina General Statute §115C-238.66. Board of directors; powers and duties

North Carolina General Statute §115C-366.4. Assignment of students convicted of cyber-bullying

North Carolina General Statute §115C-407.15. Bullying and harassing behavior

North Carolina General Statute §115C-407.16. Policy against bullying and harassing behavior

North Carolina General Statute §115C-407.17. Prevention of school violence

North Carolina General Statute §115C-407.18. Construction of this article

== School violence prevention acts in other states ==
School bullying laws in the United States-2

49 of the 50 States in the USA have anti-bullying laws.

== See also ==
- Bullying
- School violence

== Resources ==
N.C. Center for Safer Schools

Pacer's National Bullying Prevention Center

American Federation of Teachers

U.S. Department of Health and Social Services
