= Uniform Premarital Agreement Act =

Uniform Act regarding prenuptial agreements across state borders in the USA

The Uniform Premarital Agreement Act (UPAA) is a Uniform Act governing prenuptial agreements, which are also properly referred to as "premarital agreements" and "antenuptial agreements". It was drafted by the National Conference of Commissioners on Uniform State Laws in 1983 to promote more uniformity and predictability between state laws relating to premarital agreements in an increasing transient society. The UPAA was enacted to ensure that a premarital agreement that was validly entered into in one state would be honored by the courts of another state where a couple might get a divorce.

In 2012, the Uniform Law Commission promulgated the updated and revised Uniform Premarital and Marital Agreements Act (UPMAA), which established procedural and substantive safeguards for marital agreements in an effort to bring them into accord with safeguards for premarital agreements.

So far the UPAA/UPMAA has been adopted by 28 states and the District of Columbia: Arizona, Arkansas, California, Colorado, Connecticut, Delaware, Florida, Hawaii, Idaho, Illinois, Indiana, Iowa, Kansas, Maine, Montana, Nebraska, Nevada, New Jersey, New Mexico, North Carolina, North Dakota, Oregon, Rhode Island, South Dakota, Texas, Utah, Virginia, and Wisconsin. The laws enacted by jurisdictions adopting the UPAA/UPMAA do have variances from state-to-state, but this uniform framework of consistent laws has certainly made it much easier for contract drafters to prepare legally-compliant premarital agreements by codifying the requirements.

The UPAA/UPMAA has not been adopted in 22 states, although premarital agreements are still legal in these states: Alabama, Arkansas, Georgia, Kentucky, Louisiana, Maryland, Massachusetts, Michigan, Mississippi, Minnesota, Missouri, New Hampshire, New York, Ohio, Oklahoma, Pennsylvania, South Carolina, Tennessee, Vermont, Washington, West Virginia and Wyoming.
