= Constitution of North Carolina =

American state constitution

The Constitution of the State of North Carolina governs the structure and function of the state government of North Carolina, one of the U.S. states; it is the highest legal document for the state and subjugates North Carolina law. (Like all U.S. state constitutions, it is still subject to federal judicial review.)

Seal of North Carolina 1776. Now an alternate seal.

The first North Carolina Constitution was created in 1776 after the American Declaration of Independence. Since the first state constitution, there have been two major revisions and many amendments. The current form was ratified in 1971 and has 14 articles.

The three constitutions North Carolina has had are:

- 1776: as the first constitution of the independent state. The Declaration of Rights was ratified the preceding day.
- 1868: Framed in accordance with the Reconstruction Acts after North Carolina was readmitted into the Union. It was a major reorganization and modification of the original into fourteen articles. It also introduced townships which each county was required to create, the only southern state to do so.
- 1971: Minor consolidation of the 1868 Constitution and subsequent amendments.

== History ==
Through its history, North Carolina has had three Constitutions: the Constitution of 1776, the Constitution of 1868, and the Constitution of 1971.

=== Constitution of 1776 ===
In the pivotal months leading up to the creation of the Constitution, North Carolina was in a unique position of being governed by a council of safety of only thirteen members. Following this unique position, the Fifth North Carolina Provincial Congress ratified the first constitution, accompanied by a Declaration of Rights, on December 18,1776. The congress debated the Constitution for only 3 days before passing it like law.

Prior to independence, the colonial government of NC concentrated power at the top of society. North Carolina had a very strong governing power. The governor had veto power, striking down any law that they did not see fit, and the governor would keep the interest of the British King in mind. Maintaining a good relationship on an international level was important for American success. The Americans needed European investment in order to thrive. Leading up to the revolution most of the gentry, the wealthy, aristocratic class, was up to their neck in debt. They were relying on European investment to bring success to the American economy. Appeasing the King was necessary, but this would soon shift with the establishment of statehood. The governor would be stripped of their veto power, and there would be a council that votes on decisions. Although the constitution affirmed the separation of power between the three branches of government, the General Assembly held the true power. Until 1836, the General Assembly members were the only state officials who were elected by the people. The General Assembly picked Judges, the Governor and the members in the Council of State.

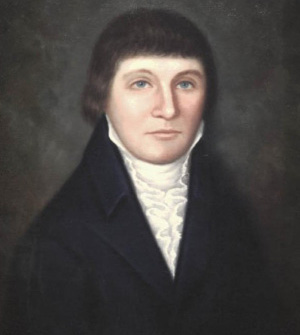
Richard Caswell, first Governor of North Carolina and president of the Fifth North Carolina Provincial Congress.

Judges had life terms and governors had a one-year term. The Governor had little power and in many cases needed the consent of the Council of State to exercise the power that the office did hold. More importantly, the constitution featured a weak executive branch, with most of the power going to the legislature. The governor, the first being Richard Caswell (who was the president of the Fifth North Carolina Provincial Congress), would be voted in by a legislature, not the people, and would serve a one year term, renewable up to three consecutive terms, with limited powers and no power to veto. This highlights a change in power, shifting from the governor to the lower assembly. The constitution established a judicial branch, but did not well define this branch's structure. The constitution also lacked a system of local government. Universal suffrage was not an element of this constitution. Only landowners could vote for Senators until 1857. To hold state office required land ownership until 1868.

The house of commons would be elected by all free men who owned at least 50 acres of land, and senators elected by all freeholders who had at least 50 acres of land in the county. To hold office, you had to be a Protestant Christian, a religious test to be in power and there were land requirements. 100 acres of land was required to hold the position as senate. This restricted who could run for the position, limiting the power that the people had. The strong legislative control highlighted a belief that representatives of the people should hold the power. This would be a step forward and more democratic than the tyrannical British rule that was previous to this constitution. The constitution would also feature a declaration of rights, signed by Richard Caswell, the first governor, and James Green, clerk of Provincial Congress.

Most clauses in North Carolina’s declaration were taken from Maryland, Virginia, and Pennsylvania. Following the trends of fellow sister states. Even so, it was the “revolutionary” constitution of North Carolina. Enacting State constitutions would be a very crucial step in the growth of democracy in America. With these new parameters in place, between 62 and 83 percent of the white adult males could vote in most counties of North Carolina. This would mean that the constitution would be very well accepted by land owning white men. The majority of other groups would be left out of political participation because of land ownership being a requirement to participate.

This new government placed power in a body of representatives elected by the people. This was a great step forward for democracy in America. Power was shifting to the people. Moving to a more republican government meant that more power would be consolidated in the public. During this time, the gentry was afraid of giving the common people too much power, they thought the common people would come for their wealth. But, the people would get more power as time goes on. Also as mentioned earlier, 62 to 83 percent of white land owning men could vote. Although there is still a large number of people, women, enslaved, Native Americans, even free black people, and non-land owners, who would not participate in politics, it would still be a more democratic government than that of a tyrannical British government. But, this would not go without checks to democracy. The creation of a Senate would protect the interests of the elite in North Carolina, the senate would "advise the governor in the execution of his office." To hold office in Senate you had to own 300 acres of land. This would ensure that only wealthy white men would be able to hold office, the people electing the senators also had to own 50 acres of land. This would ensure that the senate would be able to check the common people when the interests of the elite were at risk.

The Declaration of Rights would hold many important powers for the people of North Carolina. Article one would allow for popular sovereignty, “all political power is vested in and derived from the people.” The third demanded equality, although during this time period it would only apply to white men. Article nine, the right to a trial by jury, protection against arbitrary rule. Article 12, the right against unjust seizure, similar to the later fourth amendment of the U.S. Bill of Rights. Article 15, declaring freedom of the press. Article 17, the right to bear arms. Something that is heavily debated over today was something not debated at all in this time. The right to bear arms was seen as necessary for the defense of the state. Lastly, Article 19, calling for religious freedom, but this had limits. Office holders still had to be of Protestant Christian religion. These are some highlights of the Declaration of Rights from North Carolina in 1776. Featuring 25 sections total, it would be expanded over time.

=== Convention of 1835 ===
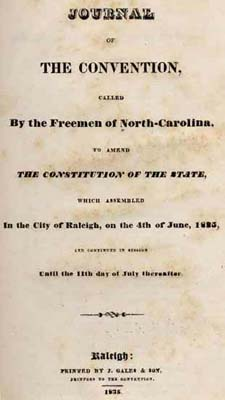
North Carolina State Constitutional Convention of 1835

Dissatisfied with the central role of the General Assembly, a state constitutional convention was called in 1835. Out of the convention came many amendments. Among those changes was fixing the membership of the Senate and House at their present levels, 50 and 120. Also, the office of Governor became popularly elected. These changes gave the more populous western counties more of a say in government but still favored those who owned property, since this was required to vote and hold office. The vote was taken away from freed slaves in this convention. The convention approved the changes on July 11, 1835. The convention's proposed changes were adopted by vote of the people on November 9, 1835.

=== Convention of 1861–1862 ===
The Convention of 1861–1862 was called to revise the constitution to remove North Carolina from the United States. The procedure used to amend the constitution did not need a vote of the people.

=== Constitution of 1868 ===
In 1865, Governor William W. Holden called for a Conference to write a new Constitution; it was rejected by a popular vote. Two years later, they reconvened. The new Constitution gave more power to the people and to the governor. "For its time, it was a progressive and democratic instrument of government." Akin to the Fourteenth Amendment to the United States Constitution, also adopted in 1868, it was product of the winning side in the Civil War: the (anti-slavery) Republicans and a few scalawags. "It was highly unpopular with the more conservative elements of the state."

From 1869 through 1968, there were submitted to the voters of North Carolina a total of 97 propositions for amending the Constitution of the State. All but one of these proposals originated in the General Assembly. Of those 97 amendment proposals, 69 were ratified by the voters and 28 were rejected by them. Due to the many amendments, many provisions in the constitution became antiquated, obsolete, and ambiguous. The document had simply become difficult to read and interpret. By 1971, there were 200 state agencies.

=== Convention of 1875 ===
A convention was held in 1875. It was attended by George Lawrence Mabson.

=== Constitution of 1971 ===
The draft that later became the Constitution of 1971 began with a study into needed changes by the North Carolina State Bar in 1967. The study outlined a vastly improved and easily ratifiable document. The draft constitution logically organized topics and omitted obviously unconstitutional sections. The language and syntax was also updated and standardized. The study separated from the main document several amendments that it felt were necessary, but were potentially controversial. The main document passed the General Assembly in 1969 with only one negative vote in seven roll-call votes. On November 3, 1970, the proposed Constitution of 1971 was approved by a vote of 393,759 to 251,132.

Since the Constitution of 1971, there have been over twenty amendments. The majority of these amendments extend the rights of citizens, or extend the government the ability to issue bonds. One notable exception was in 2012, when an amendment was added to prevent recognition of same-sex marriage. The following are significant amendments made since the 1971 constitution:

- Prohibiting all capitation and poll tax.
- Omitting the limitation on property tax of $0.20 per $100 valuation.
- Creating a state income tax to be computed on the same basis as the federal income tax
- Allowing the Governor and Lieutenant Governor to serve two consecutive terms (previously, office holders were limited to one term).
- Requiring the state to run a balanced budget.
- Requiring judges to be lawyers.
- Adding Victims Rights to (and expanding and clarifying the said rights in) the Declaration of Rights.
- Giving the Governor the veto power.
- Prohibiting a person convicted of a felony from holding the office of county sheriff.
- Defining a marriage between one man and one woman to be the only legal domestic union to be recognized by the state. (See North Carolina Amendment 1.)

==== Executive Organization Act ====
Article III, Section 11 of the North Carolina Constitution, approved by voters on November 3, 1970, required the legislature to reduce the more than 300 administrative departments, agencies, and offices to no more than 25 principal administrative departments by 1 July 1975. This law lead to the creation of 19 principal offices or departments, including the 10 members of the North Carolina Council of State, elected by the voters (governor, lieutenant governor, secretary of state, state auditor, state treasurer, superintendent of public instruction, attorney general, and commissioners of agriculture, labor, and insurance) and the nine member North Carolina Cabinet departments headed by secretaries selected by the governor, and (since 2017) consented to by the Senate.

== Summary ==
The current North Carolina Constitution contains a Preamble and 14 articles. Each of the articles covers a different area, with the last article including all miscellaneous topics. Each article is further divided into sections. The constitution incorporates constitutional amendments into the document, unlike the US Constitution, which only appends amendments.

=== Preamble ===
We, the people of the State of North Carolina, grateful to Almighty God, the Sovereign Ruler of Nations, for the preservation of the American Union and the existence of our civil, political and religious liberties, and acknowledging our dependence upon Him for the continuance of those blessings to us and our posterity, do, for the more certain security thereof and for the better government of this State, ordain and establish this Constitution.

=== Article I – Declaration of Rights ===
Each of the 37 sections of Article I outline a separate recognized right. Many of the sections give more depth to the rights covered by the United States Bill of Rights. The state constitution also secures additional rights: for example, the right to a public education and to open courts. Also of note, this section specifically denies the state the ability to secede from the United States and declares that each citizen of this State owes paramount allegiance to the Constitution and government of the United States. Section 38, added in 2018, is the newest addition to this article. This section declares the right to hunt and fish.

=== Article II – Legislative ===
Article II declares that all legislative powers in North Carolina are given to the General Assembly. The General Assembly consists of a Senate and a House of Representatives, with 50 and 120 members, respectively. Guidelines for the formation of voting districts and qualification for office are also covered. Each house has a term of two years. This article also gives the governor the power to veto public bills, defined as bills affecting more than 15 counties, in most circumstances. Veto power was denied the governor until 1996 when the constitution was amended. North Carolina was the last state to extend this power to its governor.

=== Article III – Executive ===
The governor is vested with all executive authority in Article III. The duties of the governor are defined as is the process of succession, should the governor die or become incapacitated. Holders of the governor office are limited to two consecutive terms. The Council of State, a cabinet-like body, is filled with eight popularly elected officials, in addition to the governor and lieutenant governor. This article also defines and mandates a balanced budget.

=== Article IV – Judicial ===
Article IV defines the make-up the judicial branch of the state and prohibits the legislature from inhibiting its function. Similar to the federal government, the power to impeach state officials and judges, in the cross-hairs, are given to the state House of Representatives. The Senate can remove a person from office with a 2/3 majority vote after an impeachment. This article also deals with the necessary qualifications of a judge and confers the power of judicial review with the state's Supreme Court.

=== Article V – Finance ===
Article V gives the state government the right to tax its citizens unlimitedly under certain guidelines. It authorizes an up to 7% income tax and also limits the ability to issue public bonds.

=== Article VI – Suffrage and Eligibility to Office ===
Article VI provides the right to vote to every person who is at least 18 years, an American citizen, living within North Carolina, and (since 2018) has a voter ID. This right is denied to felons (when any part of a felony sentence, including probation, is active) and people illiterate in English.

This article also sets the eligibility for holding office. No one can hold elected state office who:

1. Is younger than 21 years of age
2. Denies the existence of God (see Infeasible provisions)
3. Is not qualified to vote in an election for that office
4. Has been convicted of treason or felony, or of corruption or malpractice in any office, or impeached, unless citizenship rights have been restored (See felony disenfranchisement in the United States)
5. Already holds a state or federal office

=== Article VII – Local Government ===
Article VII gives the general assembly the power to define the boundaries of governmental subdivisions (counties, towns, cities). It limits the distance of newly incorporated towns or cities from established towns or cities based on the established town or city's population, subject to a waiver by 3/5 absolute majority. The office of sheriff is provided for each county.

=== Article VIII – Corporations ===
Article VIII defines corporations. It also gives the General Assembly the right to create and regulate corporations.

=== Article IX – Education ===
Article IX makes public education compulsory for all able-bodied children, unless educated by other means. The North Carolina State Board of Education is defined here and given the power to regulate all free public education in the state. This article demands that the General Assembly establish a system of higher education and states that higher education should be free, as far as practicable.

=== Article X – Homesteads and Exemptions ===
Article X prevents the forced sale of a person's primary residence to pay for a debt, unless the house was specifically used as collateral for a loan. Females are also able to maintain full ownership of all property they own when they marry, under this article. Also, life insurance policies that are paid to a spouse or child are exempt from claims of debt from the estate of the deceased.

=== Article XI – Punishments, Corrections, and Charities ===
Article XI describes the only punishment methods to be used by the state. It specifically only allows the death penalty in cases of murder, arson, burglary, and rape. This article gives the responsibility of the public welfare to the General Assembly.

=== Article XII – Military Forces ===
This short article states: The Governor shall be Commander in Chief of the military forces of the State and may call out those forces to execute the law, suppress riots and insurrections, and repel invasion.

=== Article XIII – Conventions; Constitutional Amendment and Revision ===
Article XIII describes the two ways the constitution may be amended: by popular convention or through legislation. Legislation is the most common way to amend the constitution. The last time the constitution was amended by convention was in 1875. In a legislative action, an amendment must pass by three-fifths in both houses of the General Assembly and also obtain a majority of a popular vote.

=== Article XIV – Miscellaneous ===
The final article of the constitution covers topics not under other articles. Topics of sections in this article include:

1. Setting Raleigh as the capital.
2. Makes permanent the current state border.
3. Demanding the General Assembly uniformly apply laws to the state.
4. Gives any law that was legally enacted before this constitution the ability to remain in effect unless the law conflicts with the constitution.
5. Provides the General Assembly the ability to conserve natural resources by the creation of parks and the enactment of laws, sometimes referred to as the "environmental bill of rights."
6. Defines marriage as between one man and one woman (see also: North Carolina Amendment 1). This section was declared unconstitutional by federal courts in 2014.

== Infeasible provisions ==
As per the Federal Supremacy Clause, all Federal law and the Constitution of the United States overrule the North Carolina Constitution. There are several provisions in the current North Carolina Constitution that may conflict with federal law or the US Constitution.

At least two provisions are not presently enforced either because they are known to be void or would almost certainly be struck down in court, even though they were carried over verbatim from the 1868 Constitution.

- Article 6, section 8 disqualifies from office any person who shall deny the being of Almighty God. However, in 1961, the federal Supreme Court, in Torcaso v. Watkins threw out a similar provision in the Maryland Constitution on the grounds that it violated the First and Fourteenth Amendments to the federal Constitution. The First Amendment bars Congress from passing any law "respecting an establishment of religion," and longstanding precedent holds that it is binding on the states under the Due Process Clause of the Fourteenth Amendment. In 1972, North Carolina Attorney General Robert Morgan opined that the provision likely did not comply with the First Amendment and could not be enforced. On December 7, 2009, Cecil Bothwell was sworn in as Asheville City Councilman, and was revealed to be an atheist. Former NAACP president H. K. Edgerton threatened to file a lawsuit against the city.
- Article 6, section 4 requires that a person be literate in the English language before registering to vote. This provision was widely used to effectively disenfranchise African-American voters in the Jim Crow era. As such, it is widely held that this section violates the Voting Rights Act. However, several attempts to remove this provision have failed. On April 25, 2017, the N.C. House voted unanimously to pass House Bill 148, a bipartisan bill to start the process of repealing the literacy requirement for voting in the state.

In addition, federal and state court decisions have narrowed the scope of at least two sections of the constitution. Article 2, sections 3 & 5, sub-section 2 state that counties must not be divided when drawing state legislative districts. This provision is known as the "Whole County Provision." However, in 1981, the federal Justice Department ruled that this provision was inconsistent with the Voting Rights Act. The state thus ignored the Whole County Provision until 2002. That year, the North Carolina Supreme Court ruled that the state constitution's equal protection clause presumed single-member districts and was thus a limitation on the Whole County Provision. It can also be argued that the "one person, one vote" rule from Reynolds v. Sims also limits this provision.

Section 2 of Article 11 ("Death Punishment") limits executions to "murder, arson, burglary, and rape". Per Kennedy v. Louisiana, the last three are inapplicable.

North Carolina Amendment 1's declaration to not recognize same-sex marriages is contrary to the Fourteenth Amendment to the United States Constitution as interpreted by the United States Supreme Court in Obergefell v. Hodges, as well as the federal Respect for Marriage Act.

== See also ==
- Law of North Carolina

== Works cited ==
- Orth, John V.; Newby, Paul M. (2013). The North Carolina State Constitution (second ed.). Oxford University Press. ISBN 9780199300655.
