= The Most Hated Family in America =

2007 BBC documentary film

- Film titlecard
- Written by: Louis Theroux
- Directed by: Geoffrey O'Connor
- Starring: Louis Theroux; Fred Phelps; Shirley Phelps-Roper; Steve Drain
- Country of origin: United Kingdom
- Original language: English

Production
- Producer: Geoffrey O'Connor
- Editor: Rob Kuhns
- Running time: 60 minutes

Original release
- Network: BBC Two
- Release: April 2007

Related
- America's Most Hated Family in Crisis, Surviving America's Most Hated Family

The Most Hated Family in America is a 2007 BBC documentary film written and presented by Louis Theroux about the family at the core of the Westboro Baptist Church. The organization was led by Fred Phelps and located in Topeka, Kansas. Westboro Baptist Church members believe that the United States government is immoral due to its tolerance of homosexuality; in addition, they protest at funerals of U.S. military killed in action with signs that display text such as "God Hates Fags" and "Thank God for Dead Soldiers" (which is shown in the film). With a BBC film crew, Theroux travelled to Kansas to spend time with members of the church and interview its leadership. Theroux interviews church leadership including Fred Phelps and Shirley Phelps-Roper.

The documentary first aired on BBC Two in the United Kingdom in April 2007. The documentary was a ratings success in its initial airing, beating simultaneous programming for BBC One for the 9pm hour. It was broadcast again on BBC Two later that month, and Seven Network purchased the programme for airing in Australia in August 2007 and again in April 2008. It aired in May 2008 on TV3 and Seven Network, and multiple times in June 2008 on the television channel Dave. It aired again on BBC Two in December 2008 and in February 2010 in Ireland on 3e. A DVD-box-set including the documentary and other Theroux programmes was released in January 2009; The Independent placed the DVD release as number eight among its list of "The 50 Best DVD boxsets".

The Most Hated Family in America received a positive reception, with four-star ratings from the Daily Record. It was recommended in reviews as a critic's choice by The Independent, The Times, Financial Times, The Age, and the Herald Sun. A review in the Leicester Mercury noted of Theroux's interview techniques, "His subtle interviewing style was perfect for showing off the crazy views of the members." The documentary was highlighted in The Sydney Morning Herald among "The week's best", and characterised as, "Disturbing, perplexing and very entertaining."

A follow-up documentary by Theroux, America's Most Hated Family in Crisis, was first broadcast on BBC Two on 3 April 2011. In 2019, Theroux made another follow-up, Surviving America's Most Hated Family, essentially creating a trilogy of documentaries based on the church.

== Background ==
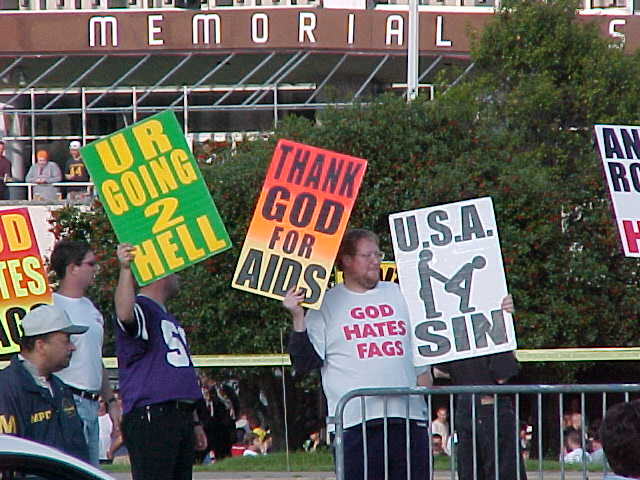
Westboro Baptist Church members with protest signs (2000)

The documentary focuses on the Westboro Baptist Church, then headed by Fred Phelps and based in Topeka, Kansas. Born in 1929 in Meridian, Mississippi, Phelps conducts himself under the belief that he is a prophet chosen by God "to preach his message of hate". Phelps was ordained a Southern Baptist in 1947. The Westboro Baptist Church was started by Phelps in 1955. Members of the church meet in Phelps' residence; the majority of the group's adherents are his family. Phelps received an associate's degree from John Muir Junior College in 1951, a bachelor's degree in 1962 and a degree in law in 1964 from Washburn University. He formed a "crusade for righteousness", attempting to abolish Jim Crow laws in Topeka.

In 1991 when a local park started to serve as a meeting place for homosexual men, Phelps began to protest against homosexuality. Phelps subsequently enlarged the scope of his activities and formed protests in areas where civil rights were being debated for LGBT people. Phelps received criticism in 1998 when he repeatedly exclaimed "Matt is in hell" during the funeral of Matthew Shepard, a man murdered for being homosexual.

Westboro Baptist Church bases its work around the belief that "God Hates Fags", and expresses the opinion, based on its Biblical interpretation, that nearly every tragedy in the world is God's punishment for homosexuality – specifically society's increasing tolerance and acceptance of gay, lesbian, and bisexual people. It maintains that God hates homosexuals above all other kinds of "sinners" and that homosexuality should be a capital crime. The church runs the website GodHatesFags.com, and GodHatesAmerica.com, and websites expressing condemnation of LGBT people, Roman Catholics, Muslims, Hindus, Jews, Sweden, Ireland, Canada, the Netherlands, and the United States. The organisation is monitored by the Anti-Defamation League and is classified as a hate group by the Southern Poverty Law Center. The group has achieved notoriety because of its picketing of funeral processions of U.S. soldiers killed in combat in Iraq and Afghanistan.

Controversial acts of Phelps and the Westboro Baptist Church resulted in litigation and the formation of groups which counter-protest against its efforts. President George W. Bush signed the Respect for America's Fallen Heroes Act into law on Memorial Day in May 2006. Groups of American Legion members formed motorcycle honor guards, such as the Patriot Guard Riders, with the intention of safeguarding funerals of U.S. military from the church protesters. Another group, called "Free Republic," held signs praising the military.

== Content ==
The Most Hated Family in America includes footage of members of the Westboro Baptist Church picketing at funerals of United States soldiers. The organisation members hold signs blaming deaths of U.S. soldiers on the country's tolerance towards homosexuality and LGBTQ people. Westboro Baptist Church members believe that these deaths are caused by God as retribution for the immorality of the U.S., stating the soldiers were "struck down by God for fighting for a depraved nation".

They attend the funeral of a soldier Kevin Zeigler who died at the age of 31 while attempting to disable a bomb in Iraq. Referring to improvised explosive devices, Westboro Baptist Church hold signs reading, "Thank God for IEDs". Protest signs carried by members of the organisation at the funeral, including six-year-old children, state: "Thank God For Dead Soldiers", "Don't Worship The Dead" and "Fag Marines". Another placard criticises Diana, Princess of Wales, for her friendship with the LGBT community, stating, "Royal Whore in Hell". Diana is criticised by the organisation as a "fag enabler". Additional signs read "God hates fags", "Thank God for Dead Soldiers", "God is America's Terrorist", and "Fag Troops". The Westboro Baptist Church members reveled in the September 11 attacks and stated they were punishment for the country's "fornication and lust". The group also protests outside the local synagogue and holds signs which state that, "Jews worship the rectum".

Theroux interviews members of the Phelps family including Fred Phelps (called "Gramps" by members of the organisation) and Shirley Phelps-Roper. Theroux asks Fred Phelps, "Isn't it an act of presumption, when you don't have all the information about all the other churches, to assume you have privileged access to Grace?" Phelps responds, "Oh, I know all there is to know about 'em." When Theroux asks him how he knows this, Phelps answers, "I'm not going to keep on talking to you. I know what you are [ … ] You're an evil … I don't even wanna go there [ … ] Good luck to ya!"

== Filmmaker ==
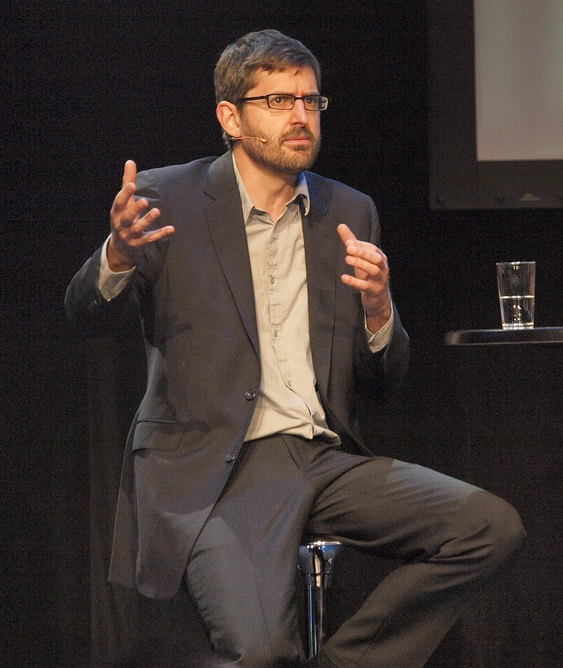
Louis Theroux (2009)

Theroux traveled from the United Kingdom to Kansas, United States to meet members of the Westboro Baptist Church. Theroux and a BBC film crew spent three weeks in Topeka, Kansas, gathering information on the 71 members of the organisation. In an article for The Guardian, Theroux noted, "It was fascinating to see the power of a family to create its own bizarre ideology and pass it down through the generations." In a statement in The Age, Theroux posited, "Maybe, through my enthusiasm, people reveal more of themselves than they may have intended. The show is laughing at me, adrift in their world, as much as at them." The Western Mail quoted Theroux on how he selects subject matter which interests him, "The subjects I'm interested in are quite extreme. They're so far beyond the pale of normal human interaction that you're never going to get a reality show on that territory."

In an interview with BBC News, Theroux stated that the Phelpses are the most extreme people he has ever met. Regarding Fred Phelps' teachings, Theroux stated, "I think that the pastor is not a very nice person. I think he's an angry person who's twisted the Bible and picked and chosen verses that support his anger, that sort of justify his anger, and he's instilled that in his children and they've passed it on to their children. Although the second and third generation are by and large quite nice people from what I saw, they still live under the influence of their Gramps."

Apart from their protests, Theroux found them to be quite kind, and commented, "It shows you what strange avenues the religious impulse can take you down. I think another part of the answer is that parts of the Christian Bible are pretty weird. There's a lot of weird stuff in there and when you take that and you add this angry, domineering kind of a father figure, which is Gramps, and you add that he has sort of separated them off from other people, other families and driven them to achieve a lot, and he was kind of a charismatic guy, and still is up to a point. He was [ … ] very verbal, very persuasive, [ and ] an extremely compelling speaker. All these things added together combined to make a powerful influence."

== Reception ==
=== Response from organization ===
The Westboro Baptist Church appreciated the attention its organisation received from the documentary, and added a citation to the film on its website. Shirley Phelps-Roper stated she had one regret about the documentary: "If he had just called it, 'The Most Hated Family in the World'". The Washington Post reported, "In the last hours of the last days, she explained, Jesus said his chosen will be 'hated by all men.'"

On 8 April 2007, Fred Phelps Sr preached a sermon addressing Louis Theroux directly and personally, accusing Theroux of taking "cheap unfair advantage" of the young women in the church, and trying to embarrass them about their chastity. Phelps also stated that Theroux "contrives and manipulates those he interviews", accusing him of feigning naivety on camera.

=== Release and ratings ===
The Most Hated Family in America aired on BBC Two on 1 April 2007. The Guardian characterised its performance as "a ratings hit". The film received 19 percent of viewership between the 9pm to 10pm hour, and beat programming for BBC One for the same time period. The documentary received 4.3 million viewers while the programme which aired at the same time on BBC One only drew 1.8 million viewers. The Most Hated Family in America was again aired on BBC Two on 4 April 2007.

In August 2007, Seven Network of Australia purchased a package of programmes from the BBC including The Most Hated Family in America and two other specials by Theroux: Under the Knife and Gambling in Las Vegas. In April 2008, Seven Network purchased The Most Hated Family in America and the same two other programmes from the BBC, with an additional two documentaries by Theroux added: Behind Bars and African Hunting Holiday. In May 2008, the documentary aired on TV3. The documentary aired in Australia on Seven Network in May 2008. It aired again in the UK on 21 and 26 June 2008 on the television channel Dave. The documentary aired again on BBC Two on 18 December 2008.

In January 2009, The Most Hated Family in America was released as part of a DVD boxed set in PAL region 2 format, along with African Hunting Holiday, Under The Knife, Behind Bars, and Gambling in Las Vegas. Titled, Louis Theroux: The Strange and The Dangerous, the DVD set received a four-out-of-four-star recommendation from The Daily Record. In February 2009, The Independent placed the DVD release as number eight among its list of "The 50 Best DVD boxsets", and characterised The Most Hated Family in America as the "strangest episode of the set, and by far the most disturbing". The documentary aired in Ireland on 10 February 2010 on 3e.

=== Critical reception ===
Writing for The Times, journalist David Chater highlighted The Most Hated Family in America among selections for "Chater's Choice". Chater commented, "Louis Theroux undertakes his ugliest assignment to date." Chater concluded, "Theroux deploys all his logic and charm to find the humanity beneath the rhetoric, but ultimately fails. It is difficult to reason with people who think that holding up a placard proclaiming 'Jews worship the rectum' is 'a courteous and loving' thing to do." The film was highlighted in the Liverpool Echo as "Sunday's: Pick of the day". Peter Grant of the Liverpool Echo commented, "Louis Theroux took a trip to Kansas for his documentary, The Most Hated Family in America. His profile of Westboro Baptist Church, the home of America's most fanatical Christian fundamentalists, was astonishing." Karl French of Financial Times selected the film as his "Critic's Choice". French wrote positively of the documentary, "After painting himself into an oddball- documentary corner a few years back, Theroux wisely took a long break, and he's come back refreshed, as confirmed by this film. In the way it reveals the comic horror inherent in all forms of zealotry, it is every bit as compelling as Theroux's recent Vegas documentary."

Writing for The Scotsman, Andrea Mullaney articulated, "Theroux really had found the ultimate in weirdness for his latest documentary – they're so beyond the point of reason, into a self-perpetuating psychosis, that no matter how he tried, he couldn't challenge their beamingly-delivered pronouncements, or trip them up. But he did manage to show them as human beings (more than the courtesy they extend to us sinners)." Hilary Fannin of The Irish Times commented that the airing of the documentary, "saw Louis Theroux, in The Most Hated Family in America, shatter another redneck American target, the Westboro Baptist Church". In a review of the documentary for The Sunday Times, Roland White discussed Theroux's stylistic technique, "Theroux's usual technique – the friendly ingenue – made absolutely no impact on these people. It was like watching a youngster from a village cricket team trying to bowl out Geoff Boycott, and I began to wonder what Theroux was hoping to achieve. It is impossible to out–argue the religious bigot. They have impeccable logic on their side: the word of God is the righteous truth; only they understand the true word of the Lord; therefore, they are right and everybody else is wrong." Liverpool Daily Post recommended the film in its column, "Sunday: What to Watch". Writing for the Birmingham Mail, Graham Young observed, "The Most Hated Family in America is the best documentary from Louis since long before his Michael Jackson fiasco." John Dugdale of The Sunday Times highlighted the film as his "Pick of the day". Dugdale wrote favorably of the film, "There are echoes of Theroux's film about a woman raising her daughters as neo-Nazis as he watches Phelps' daughter, Shirley, handing out placards to kids as young as seven. While tangling with her and her dad is pointless, the family's younger women are less inflexible, and his encounters with them are more rewarding." A review in the Leicester Mercury noted of Theroux's interview techniques, "His subtle interviewing style was perfect for showing off the crazy views of the members."

Writing in The Independent, Cathy Pryor declared, "Louis Theroux is out-oddballed this week by the subject of his latest documentary ... Astonishingly, Theroux makes you feel some sympathy for them and the price they pay for being the way they are." Thomas Sutcliffe of The Independent posited that viewers were "...[left] wondering, after an hour, whether the Phelps hadn't got a bit more out of it than Louis. They aren't representative of anything but themselves, after all, and they rejoice in the world's detestation. So they had nothing to lose by being held up to ridicule, and gained exactly what they want – a bigger audience for their insane rantings." Writing for The Daily Record, Paul English wrote favorably, "The journalist in me marvels at yet more great work from Theroux. But the human in me mourns that we gave this appalling family exactly what they want. The shiny badge of notoriety..." A review in the Irish Independent was critical of giving any coverage to the group, "Theroux tried to get the teenage daughters to deviate from the standard family line but they weren't budging an inch. The end result was that a group of loathsome people who spend every second of their lives trying to attract free publicity for themselves got a whole hour of it courtesy of the BBC. Ah, the joys of public service television." Writing for The Observer, Kathryn Flett was critical of the choice of title for the documentary, commenting, "The Most Hated Family in America? Says who? Louis Theroux? BBC2? Ooh, I don't like a sweeping statement of a documentary title. Not that the family who comprise the majority of the 71 congregants of the Westboro Baptist Church of Topeka, Kansas, aren't appalling, but the title definitely infers that they are the family most hated by most Americans, when I doubt most Americans have the faintest idea who they are." Mike Bradley of The Observer commented about the film, "A shock doc, but an easy target for Theroux."

In a review for the Melbourne, Australia newspaper, The Age, Larry Schwartz selected the documentary as "Critic's Choice". Schwartz was critical of Theroux's lack of detachment from his subject matter, "He repeatedly distances himself from the church, expressing his disapproval of their views. But so concerned is he, he seems almost evangelical in his determination to show them the error of their ways." The documentary was highlighted in The Sydney Morning Herald among "The week's best", and critic Greg Hassall characterised it as, "Disturbing, perplexing and very entertaining." The Australia newspaper MX highlighted the documentary favorably, in its column, "Best in show". Cameron Adams of the Herald Sun selected The Most Hated Family in America as his "Top Choice" recommendation. Adams wrote, "A truly disturbing, disgusting and sad documentary. The repellent Shirley Phelps is the outspoken nutbag who got publicity by calling Heath Ledger a 'fag enabler' after his death. This jaw-dropping doco infiltrates Phelps' only-in-America church where her 11 spooky kids regularly picket funerals of US soldiers killed in Iraq – they believe God killed them to show his hatred of how 'depraved' America now is."

== Follow-ups ==
Theroux returned to Westboro Baptist Church for a follow-up documentary four years after making The Most Hated Family in America, to investigate the departure of several members of the Phelps family since his last visit. The film, America's Most Hated Family in Crisis, was first broadcast on BBC Two on 3 April 2011. Theroux's return was prompted by an email he received from a young member of the church he had interviewed previously, who had since left and been disfellowed. The U.S. Supreme Court case of Snyder v. Phelps, heard following a lawsuit leveled at Westboro Baptist Church for distress caused by the picketing of the funeral of a US Marine killed in Iraq, served as the background to the sequel. Theroux was interested in the ambivalent attitude of church members towards his first film, and stated, "The new documentary feels quite different than the original – though still funny, a little darker and stranger". He returned in 2019 to create Surviving America's Most Hated Family.

== Family tree ==
Fred Phelps family tree

Catherine Idalette	Fred Wade Phelps
Fred Waldron Phelps	Margie Marie Simms
Rachel Phelps Hockenbarger	Shirley Phelps-Roper	Jonathan Baxter Phelps	Timothy Bryan Phelps	Rebekah Phelps Davis	Fred Waldron Phelps Jr.	Abigail Phelps	Margie Jean Phelps	Elizabeth Marie Phelps	Nate Phelps	Katherine Phelps	Mark Phelps	Dorotha Phelps
Samuel Phelps-Roper	Isaiah Phelps-Roper	Rebekah Phelps-Roper	Zacharia Phelps-Roper	Joshua Phelps-Roper	Megan Phelps-Roper	Libby Phelps

== See also ==
- Faggot (slang)
- Gay bashing
- Hate speech
- Homophobia
- LGBT rights opposition
- Patriot Guard Riders
- Societal attitudes toward homosexuality
- Westboro Baptist Church
