= America's Most Hated Family in Crisis =

2011 British television documentary

- Written by: Louis Theroux
- Directed by: Emma Cooper
- Starring: Louis Theroux
- Country of origin: United Kingdom
- Original language: English

Production
- Producers: Emma Cooper; Nick Mirsky
- Running time: 60 minutes

Original release
- Network: BBC Two
- Release: 3 April 2011

Related
- The Most Hated Family in America, Surviving America's Most Hated Family

America's Most Hated Family in Crisis (also known as The Return of America's Most Hated Family in some markets) is a 2011 BBC documentary film presented and written by Louis Theroux, who revisits the family at the core of the Westboro Baptist Church. It is a follow-up to 2007's The Most Hated Family in America, also written and presented by Theroux. In 2019, Theroux made another follow-up, Surviving America's Most Hated Family, completing a trilogy of documentaries based on the church.

The documentary first aired on BBC Two in the United Kingdom on 3 April 2011 at 9pm. It received mainly positive reviews from critics, with the Metro calling it "terrifying". The documentary had 3.33 million viewers and was BBC Two's most watched programme of that week.

== Background ==
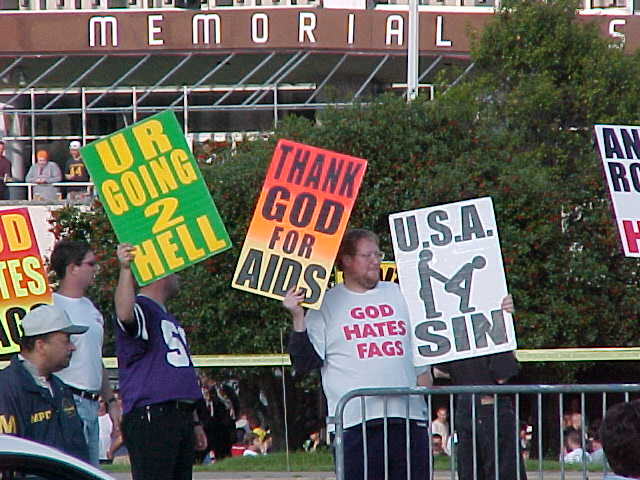
Westboro Baptist Church members with protest signs (2000)

The documentary focuses on the Westboro Baptist Church, headed by Fred Phelps and based in Topeka, Kansas. Born in 1929 in Meridian, Mississippi, Phelps conducted himself in the belief that he was a prophet chosen by God "to preach His message of hate". Phelps was ordained a Southern Baptist in 1947. The Westboro Baptist Church was started by Phelps in 1955. Members of the church meet in Phelps's residence; the majority of the group's adherents are his family. Phelps received an associate's degree from John Muir Junior College in 1951, a bachelor's degree in 1962 and a degree in law in 1964 from Washburn University. He formed a "crusade for righteousness", attempting to abolish Jim Crow laws in Topeka.

In 1991 when a local park started to serve as a meeting place for homosexual men, Phelps began to protest against homosexuality. Phelps subsequently enlarged the scope of his activities and formed protests in areas where civil rights were being debated for LGBT people. Phelps received criticism in 1998 when he repeatedly exclaimed "Matt is in hell" during the funeral of Matthew Shepard, a man murdered for being homosexual.

Westboro Baptist Church bases its work around its belief that God hates homosexuals, mainly through the use of their motto "God Hates Fags", and expresses the opinion, based on its Biblical interpretation, that nearly every tragedy in the world is God's punishment for homosexuality – specifically society's increasing tolerance and acceptance of gay, lesbian, and bisexual people. It maintains that God hates homosexuals above all other kinds of sinners and that homosexuality should be a capital crime. The church runs the websites GodHatesFags.com, GodHatesAmerica.com, and websites condemnatory of LGBT people, Roman Catholics, Muslims, Jews, Sweden, Ireland, Canada, the Netherlands, and the United States. The organisation is monitored by the Anti-Defamation League and is classified as a hate group by the Southern Poverty Law Center. The group has achieved notoriety because of its picketing of funeral processions of US soldiers killed in combat in Iraq and Afghanistan.

Controversial acts of Phelps and the Westboro Baptist Church resulted in litigation and the formation of groups which counter-protest against its efforts. President George W. Bush signed the Respect for America's Fallen Heroes Act into law on Memorial Day in May 2006. Members of the conservative Internet forum Free Republic mounted counterdemonstrations against pickets by the church. Groups of American Legion members formed motorcycle honor guards with the intention of safeguarding funerals of US military from the church protesters.

== Premise ==
Theroux returned to Topeka after four years, to investigate the departure of several members of the Phelps family since his last visit. His return was prompted by an email he received from a young member of the church he had interviewed previously, who had since left and been disfellowshipped. The US Supreme Court case of Snyder v. Phelps, heard following the suing of Westboro Baptist Church for distress caused by the picketing of the funeral of a US Marine killed in Iraq, formed the background to the new film. Theroux was interested in the ambivalent attitude of church members towards his first film, and stated that "the new documentary feels quite different than the original – though still funny, a little darker and stranger".

== Reception ==
America's Most Hated Family in Crisis received mainly positive reviews. AOL Television's Mic Wright said "America's Most Hated Family in Crisis proved once again why Louis Theroux is such an enduring explorer of the oddest and most awful corners of the world". Rachel Tarley of the Metro said "America's Most Hated Family in Crisis was terrifying" and "It really looked like it could just have been an excellent spoof film about religious extremism in America. Unfortunately, you can tell it's real because you just couldn't make this stuff up". The Daily Post commented that the programme was an "extraordinary piece of television". Onthebox.com's Rhiannon Jones gave it four out of five stars, saying "Louis himself is less his trademark, benign objectivist, and more challenging of the group's relentless twattery. The only question he doesn't address – but, why would he – is whether it's un-ethical to publicise them at all, and reward them for their shocking views with the attention those views are so transparently designed to attract". The Independent's Oliver Duggan said "[it was] truly captivating". The Liverpool Echo's Paddy Shennan said "Louis provides great publicity." However, the Irish Times's Bernice Harrison said "The excitement of seeing Theroux back on screen with a new documentary soon wore off".

== Family tree ==
Fred Phelps family tree

Catherine Idalette	Fred Wade Phelps
Fred Waldron Phelps	Margie Marie Simms
Rachel Phelps Hockenbarger	Shirley Phelps-Roper	Jonathan Baxter Phelps	Timothy Bryan Phelps	Rebekah Phelps Davis	Fred Waldron Phelps Jr.	Abigail Phelps	Margie Jean Phelps	Elizabeth Marie Phelps	Nate Phelps	Katherine Phelps	Mark Phelps	Dorotha Phelps
Samuel Phelps-Roper	Isaiah Phelps-Roper	Rebekah Phelps-Roper	Zacharia Phelps-Roper	Joshua Phelps-Roper	Megan Phelps-Roper	Libby Phelps
