= Hate speech in the United States =

Hate speech in the United States cannot be directly regulated by the government due to the fundamental right to freedom of speech protected by the Constitution. While "hate speech" is not a legal term in the United States, the U.S. Supreme Court has repeatedly ruled that most of what would qualify as hate speech in other western countries is legally protected speech under the First Amendment. In a Supreme Court case on the issue, Matal v. Tam (2017), the justices unanimously reaffirmed that there is no "hate speech" exception to the free speech rights protected by the First Amendment and that the U.S. government may not discriminate against speech on the basis of the speaker's viewpoint.

In academic circles, there has been debate over freedom of speech, hate speech, and hate speech legislation. Other forms of speech have lesser protection under court interpretations of the First Amendment, including commercial speech, "fighting words", and obscenity.

== Constitutional framework ==
The protection of civil liberties, including freedom of speech, was not written into the original 1789 Constitution of the United States but was added two years later with the Bill of Rights, implemented as several amendments to the Constitution. The First Amendment, ratified December 15, 1791, provides (in relevant part) that "Congress shall make no law ... abridging the freedom of speech, or of the press". The Fourteenth Amendment, ratified on July 9, 1868, has been interpreted by the Supreme Court as extending this prohibition to laws enacted by the states.

== Supreme Court case law ==
In 1942, the issue of group defamation was first most explicitly brought up in Chaplinsky v. New Hampshire, which surrounded the issue of a Jehovah's Witness, Walter Chaplinsky, who verbally attacked a town marshal for restricting his use of a public sidewalk to protest organized religion by calling him a "damned fascist" and "racketeer." Later, when the court heard Beauharnais v. Illinois, establishing the narrow traditional exception to the First Amendment covering those words which by their very utterances tend to inflict injury or tend to incite an immediate breach of the peace.

About a decade later in 1952, in Beauharnais v. Illinois, the Supreme Court upheld the constitutionality of the state of Illinois's group libel law, which punished expression attacking the reputation of racial, ethnic, and religious groups. The defendant was charged for distributing a leaflet that rallied white people in Chicago "to halt the further encroachment, harassment and invasion of white people, their property, neighborhoods and persons, by the Negro." Going off Chaplinsky, the court ruled that since "libelous utterances [are not] within the area of constitutionally protected speech," it did not matter that the speech did not incite any direct harm. After the Beauharnais case, the Supreme Court developed a free speech jurisprudence that loosened most aspects of the free speech doctrine. Traditionally, however, if the speech did not fall within one of the categorical exceptions, it was protected speech.

In 1969, the Supreme Court protected a Ku Klux Klan member's speech and created the "imminent danger" test to determine on what grounds speech can be limited. The court ruled in Brandenburg v. Ohio that: "The constitutional guarantees of free speech and free press do not permit a state to forbid or proscribe advocacy of the use of force, or of law violation except where such advocacy is directed to inciting imminent lawless action and is likely to incite or produce such action."

This test has been modified very little from its inception in 1969, though it was itself a modification from the earlier clear and present danger standard. Speech promoting violation of the law may still only be restricted when it poses an imminent danger of unlawful action, where the speaker has the intention to incite such action, and there is the likelihood that this will be the consequence of that speech.

In 1992, in R.A.V. v. City of St. Paul, the issue of targeting hate speech arose again when a group of white teenagers burned a cross in the front yard of an African-American family. The local ordinance in St. Paul, Minnesota, criminalized symbolic expressions tantamount to fighting words, arousing anger on the basis of race (among other protected classes). Associate Justice Antonin Scalia, writing for the Supreme Court, held that the ordinance was unconstitutional as it contravened the First Amendment by focusing on particular groups about whom speech was restricted. Scalia explained that "The reason why fighting words are categorically excluded from the protection of the First Amendment is not that their content communicates any particular idea, but that their content embodies a particularly intolerable (and socially unnecessary) mode of expressing whatever idea the speaker wishes to convey." Because the hate speech ordinance was not concerned with the mode of expression, but with the content of expression, it was a violation of the freedom of speech. Thus, the Supreme Court embraced the idea that speech in general is permissible unless it will lead to imminent violence. (Note: The Supreme Court has upheld laws that punish hate violence as an aggravating factor in the normal sentencing guidelines. In Wisconsin v. Mitchell, 508 U.S. 476 (1993) a gang of black youths beat up a white teenager because he was white. The Supreme Court upheld the Wisconsin law that considering the hate based crime in an assault as an aggravating factor is not in contravention of the first amendment.) The opinion noted "This conduct, if proved, might well have violated various Minnesota laws against arson, criminal damage to property", among a number of others, none of which was charged, including threats to any person, not to only protected classes.

In 2003, the Supreme Court decided Virginia v. Black. In a 7-2 majority opinion written by Justice Sandra Day O'Connor, the court decided that a law which criminalized public cross-burning was unconstitutional. The court noted that the law would be constitutional if the law included an element of specific intent to inspire fear of bodily harm instead of concluding that cross-burning is prima facie evidence of intent to intimidate. The court's analysis was based upon the First Amendment's free speech clause.

In 2011, the Supreme Court issued their ruling on Snyder v. Phelps, which concerned the right of the Westboro Baptist Church to protest with signs found offensive by many Americans. Snyder, the father of a soldier whose funeral was protested by Phelps' church, sued Phelps for intentional infliction of emotional distress. The issue presented was whether the First Amendment protected the expressions written on the signs from being the basis for civil liability. In an 8–1 decision the court sided with Fred Phelps, the head of Westboro Baptist Church, thereby confirming their historically strong protection of freedom of speech. The Court explained, "speech deals with matters of public concern when it can 'be fairly considered as relating to any matter of political, social, or other concern to the community' or when it 'is a subject of general interest and of value and concern to the public.'"

In June 2017, the Supreme Court affirmed in a unanimous decision on Matal v. Tam that the disparagement clause of the Lanham Act violates the First Amendment's free speech clause. The issue was about government prohibiting the registration of trademarks that are "racially disparaging". Justice Samuel Alito wrote:

Speech that demeans on the basis of race, ethnicity, gender, religion, age, disability, or any other similar ground is hateful; but the proudest boast of our free speech jurisprudence is that we protect the freedom to express "the thought that we hate". United States v. Schwimmer, 279 U. S. 644, 655 (1929) (Holmes, J., dissenting).

Justice Anthony Kennedy also wrote:

A law that can be directed against speech found offensive to some portion of the public can be turned against minority and dissenting views to the detriment of all. The First Amendment does not entrust that power to the government's benevolence. Instead, our reliance must be on the substantial safeguards of free and open discussion in a democratic society.

Effectively, the Supreme Court unanimously reaffirmed that there is no 'hate speech' exception to the First Amendment.

== Societal implementation ==
In the 1980s and 1990s, more than 350 public universities adopted "speech codes" regulating discriminatory speech by faculty and students. These codes have not fared well in the courts, where they are frequently overturned as violations of the First Amendment. Debate over restriction of "hate speech" in public universities has resurfaced with the adoption of anti-harassment codes covering discriminatory speech.

The speech that hostile work environment harassment law can prohibit varies case by case and is continually under scrutiny by the courts. The U.S. Equal Employment Opportunity Commission (EEOC) states that, "Harassment is a form of employment discrimination that violates Title VII of the Civil Rights Act of 1964, the Age Discrimination in Employment Act of 1967, (ADEA), and the Americans with Disabilities Act of 1990, (ADA). Harassment is unwelcome conduct that is based on race, color, religion, sex (including pregnancy), national origin, age (40 or older), disability or genetic information." For example, in Brown Transport Corp. v. Commonwealth, the state of Pennsylvania stated that it was religious harassment to put religious pieces in their employee newsletter and Christian-themed verses on their paychecks. In Olivant v. Department of Environmental Protection, the New Jersey Office of Administrative Law found jokes e-mailed to a workplace department and the judge ruled the jokes to "defame and dishonor men and women based upon their gender, sexual preference, religion, skin pigmentation and national and ethnic origin," thereby making them illegal.

== Private regulation ==
AT&T aimed to regulate hate speech starting in the 1960s, when various people and groups would connect tape recorders to a phone line and when anyone would call that line, the recording would play. These types of phone lines were nicknamed "dial-a-hate". This technique was used by extremists groups like the Connecticut branch of the National Socialist White People's Party and the Ku Klux Klan. These phone lines proved to be popular as a Neo-Nazi group in Philadelphia said they received 3,800 calls per week in 1973 and a Texas branch of the Ku Klux Klan used this method all the way into 1977. Some phone lines like Let Freedom Ring became popular shows that people would call in to hear a new recording every week, much like an early form of a podcast.

AT&T tried several times to end the "dial-a-hate" lines but phone companies and regulators said nothing could be done to shut down the recordings and courts protected them under the First Amendment. Eventually, AT&T required that the operators of the line identify themselves. Between this new AT&T policy and the growing expense of having a phone line, the "dial-a-hate" lines came to an end. Many of the groups found new and less expensive ways of promoting their agenda like sending messages through fax machines and digital bulletin boards. Eventually, the extremist group would spread their messages through the internet and social media.

In 1992, Congress directed the National Telecommunications and Information Administration (NTIA) to examine the role of telecommunications, including broadcast radio and television, cable television, public access television, and computer bulletin boards, in advocating or encouraging violent acts and the commission of hate crimes against designated persons and groups. The NTIA study investigated speech that fostered a climate of hatred and prejudice in which hate crimes may occur. The study failed to link telecommunication to hate crimes, but did find that "individuals have used telecommunications to disseminate messages of hate and bigotry to a wide audience." Its recommendation was that the best way to fight hate speech was through additional speech promoting tolerance, as opposed to government regulation.

== International comparisons ==
- Volksverhetzung, the German criminal delict of "incitement to hatred", often applied to Nazis and neo-fascists but also to holocaust denial and other cases of widespread incitement to hatred
- Fact sheet of the European Court of Human Rights on hate speech, 2015

== See also ==
- Censorship in the United States
