= Surviving America's Most Hated Family =

2019 Louis Theroux documentary

- Genre: Documentary film
- Written by: Louis Theroux
- Directed by: Geoffrey O'Connor
- Starring: Louis Theroux; Megan Phelps-Roper; Shirley Phelps-Roper
- Country of origin: United Kingdom
- Original language: English

Production
- Executive producers: Arron Fellows; Peter Dale
- Producer: Geoffrey O'Connor
- Production location: United States
- Editor: Alex Muggleton
- Running time: 60 minutes
- Production company: BBC Studios

Original release
- Network: BBC Two
- Release: 14 July 2019

Related
- The Most Hated Family in America; America's Most Hated Family in Crisis

Surviving America's Most Hated Family is a 2019 BBC documentary film presented and written by Louis Theroux. The programme follows as Theroux revisits the family at the core of the Westboro Baptist Church and observes how its members have changed since the 2014 death of the church's founder, Fred Phelps. The documentary first aired on BBC Two in the United Kingdom on 14 July 2019, and is the third in a trilogy of documentaries Theroux has made about the church. It was preceded by 2007's The Most Hated Family in America, and 2011's America's Most Hated Family in Crisis.

While the first two documentaries focused on the controversial doctrine, cult-like atmosphere and extensive protest activities of the church, the third documentary concerns itself primarily with the lives of former members. It also covers the impact of the death of lead Pastor Fred Phelps on the church, as well as his rumored death-bed excommunication for softening his anti-homosexual rhetoric. Megan Phelps's defection from the church, from devoted follower to critic, as well as her attempts to stay in contact with her family (in particular with her mother Shirley) is covered in detail.

== Reception ==
Surviving America's Most Hated Family garnered a mixed reception from critics. Gerard O'Donovan of The Telegraph gave it two out of five stars, deeming it "a rare misstep from this normally pin-sharp documentarian." Brian Donaldson of The List gave the special three out of five stars, calling it "a road to nowhere." Lucy Mangan of The Guardian rated it four out of five stars, while admitting it was "a deeply uncomfortable watch."

Both O'Donovan and Mangan accused the documentary of veering into exploitation. O'Donovan wrote, "Theroux went wrong, withholding some potentially distressing news from (Megan Phelps-Roper) until a moment of maximum emotional impact, and lingering long on her shocked and tearful reaction." Mangan agreed, saying "It is profoundly uncomfortable to watch and, for me, errs firmly on the side of exploitation – which is not, generally, Theroux's stock-in-trade." Phelps-Roper personally defended Theroux's decision to reveal this information in this manner, stating in a Twitter post that she knows her family will watch the documentary and will see how devastated she was.
