= Fred Phelps =

American pastor and activist (1929–2014)

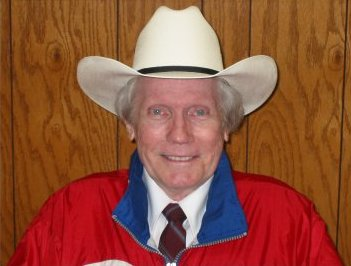
- Phelps in 2002
- Born: Fred Waldron Phelps; November 13, 1929; Meridian, Mississippi, U.S.
- Died: March 19, 2014 (aged 84); Topeka, Kansas, U.S.
- Education: Pasadena City College; Washburn University (JD)
- Occupations: Pastor, lawyer
- Organization: Westboro Baptist Church
- Political party: Democratic
- Spouse: Margie Marie Simms (m. 1952)
- Children: 13, including Shirley Phelps-Roper and Nathan Phelps
- Relatives: Megan Phelps-Roper (granddaughter)

Fred Waldron Phelps Sr. (November 13, 1929 – March 19, 2014) was an American minister and disbarred lawyer who served as the pastor of the Westboro Baptist Church, worked as a civil rights attorney, and ran for statewide election in Kansas. A divisive and controversial figure, he gained national attention for his homophobic views and protests near the funerals of gay people, AIDS victims, military veterans, and disaster victims whom he believed were killed as a result of God punishing the U.S. for having "bankrupt values" and tolerating homosexuality. Phelps founded the Westboro Baptist Church, a Topeka, Kansas-based independent Primitive Baptist congregation, in 1955. It has been described by the Southern Poverty Law Center as "arguably the most obnoxious and rabid hate group in America". Its signature slogan, "God Hates Fags", remains the name of the group's principal website.

In addition to funerals, Phelps and his followers—mostly his own immediate family members—picketed gay pride gatherings, high-profile political events, university commencement ceremonies, live performances of The Laramie Project, and functions sponsored by mainstream Christian groups with which he had no affiliation, arguing it was their sacred duty to warn others of God's anger. He continued doing so in the face of numerous legal challenges—some of which reached the U.S. Supreme Court—and near-universal opposition and contempt from other religious groups and the general public. Laws enacted at both the federal and state levels for the specific purpose of curtailing his disruptive activities were limited in their effectiveness due to the Constitutional protections afforded to Phelps under the First Amendment.

Gay rights supporters denounced him as a producer of anti-gay propaganda and violence-inspiring hate speech, and even Christians from fundamentalist denominations distanced themselves from him. In particular, Phelps and his church routinely targeted the Catholic Church with picket signs and online websites claiming that "priests rape boys" and "fag priests" and focusing on the Catholic Church sex scandals, calling the pope "The Godfather of pedophiles". Although Phelps died in 2014, the Westboro Baptist Church remains in operation. It continues to conduct regular demonstrations outside movie theaters, universities, government buildings, and other facilities in Topeka and elsewhere, and is still characterized as a hate group by the Anti-Defamation League and the Southern Poverty Law Center.

== Early life and education ==
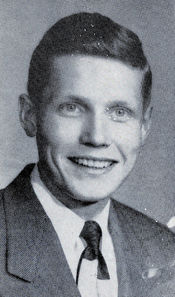
Phelps in 1962

Fred Waldron Phelps was born on November 13, 1929, in Meridian, Mississippi, the elder of two children of Catherine Idalette (née Johnston) and Fred Wade Phelps. His father was a railroad policeman for the Columbus and Greenville Railway and a devout Methodist; his mother was a homemaker. Catherine Phelps died of esophageal cancer in 1935 at the age of 28. Her aunt, Irene Jordan, helped care for Fred and his younger sister Martha Jean until December 1944, when his father married Olive Briggs, a 39-year-old woman who was divorced.

Fred distinguished himself scholastically and was an Eagle Scout. He also was a member of Phi Kappa, a high school social fraternity, president of the Young Peoples Department of Central United Methodist Church and was honored as the best drilled member of the Mississippi Junior State Guard, a unit similar to the Reserve Officer Training Corps. He graduated from Meridian High School at 16 years old, ranking sixth in his graduating class of 213 students, and was the class orator at his commencement. After graduating from high school he received an appointment to the United States Military Academy at West Point; but after attending a tent revival meeting, decided to pursue a religious calling instead.

In September 1947, at the age of 17, he was ordained a Southern Baptist minister and moved to Cleveland, Tennessee, to attend Bob Jones College (now Bob Jones University in Greenville, South Carolina). A combination of Phelps's refusal of the West Point appointment (which his father had worked hard to obtain), his abandonment of his father's beloved Methodist faith, and his father's remarriage to a divorced woman (Phelps would later become an outspoken critic of divorce) precipitated a lifelong estrangement from his father and stepmother—and by some accounts, from his sister as well. Phelps apparently never spoke to his family members again, and returned all of their letters and birthday cards, as well as Christmas gifts for his children, unopened.

Phelps dropped out of Bob Jones College in 1948. He moved to California and became a street preacher while attending John Muir College in Pasadena. The June 11, 1951 issue of Time magazine included a story on Phelps, who lectured fellow students about "sins committed on campus by students and teachers", including "promiscuous petting, evil language, profanity, cheating, teachers' filthy jokes in classrooms, and pandering to the lusts of the flesh." When the college ordered him to stop, citing a California law that forbade the teaching of religion on any public school campus, he moved his sermons across the street. In October 1951, Phelps met Margie Marie Simms in Arizona and married her in May 1952.

In 1954, Phelps, his pregnant wife, and their newborn son moved to Topeka, Kansas, where he was hired by the East Side Baptist Church as an associate pastor. The following year, the church's leadership opened Westboro Baptist Church on the other side of town, and Phelps became its pastor.

Although the new church was ostensibly Independent Baptist, Phelps preached a doctrine very similar to that of the Primitive Baptists, who believe in scriptural literalism — that Christian biblical scripture is literally true — and that only a predetermined number of people selected for redemption before the world was created will be saved on Judgment Day. His vitriolic preaching alienated church leaders and most of the original congregation, who either returned to East Side Baptist or joined other congregations, leaving him with a small following consisting almost entirely of his own relatives and close friends.

Phelps was forced to support himself selling vacuum cleaners, baby strollers, and insurance; later, some of his 13 children were reportedly compelled to sell candy door-to-door for several hours each day. In 1972, two companies sued Westboro Baptist for failing to pay for the candy being peddled by the children.

== Legal career ==
=== Civil rights cases ===
==== Early civil rights career ====
Phelps earned a law degree from Washburn University in 1964, and founded the Phelps Chartered law firm. In 1969, upon a finding of professional misconduct, authorities suspended him from practicing as a lawyer for two years.

Phelps' second notable cases were related to civil rights, and his involvement in civil rights cases in and around Kansas gained him praise from local African-American leaders.

"I systematically brought down the Jim Crow laws of this town", he claimed. Phelps' daughter Shirley Phelps-Roper was quoted as saying, "We took on the Jim Crow establishment, and Kansas did not take that sitting down. They used to shoot our car windows out, screaming we were nigger lovers." She added that the Phelps law firm made up one-third of the state's federal docket of civil rights cases.

Phelps took cases on behalf of African-American clients alleging racial discrimination by school systems, and a predominantly black American Legion post which had been raided by police, alleging racially based police abuse. Phelps' law firm obtained settlements for some clients.

==== Johnson v. Topeka Board of Education, et al. ====
Phelps' national notoriety first came from a 1973 lawsuit (settled in 1978) on behalf of a 10-year-old African-American plaintiff, Evelyn Renee Johnson (some sources say Evelyn Rene Johnson), against the Topeka Board of Education (which had, in 1954, famously lost the pivotal racial discrimination case of Brown v. Board of Education, ending legal racial segregation in U.S. public schools), and against related local, state and federal officials. In the 1973 case, Phelps argued that the Topeka Board of Education, in violation of the 1954 ruling, had not yet made its schools equal, and by attending Topeka's east-side, predominantly minority schools, the black plaintiff had received an inferior education.

Initially, Phelps attempted to file the case as a class action, in the U.S. District Court for Kansas. Asking the court to order an end to the alleged discrimination and suggesting that busing might be at least one remedy, Phelps also sought $100 million in actual damages, plus another $100 million in punitive damages—or, alternatively, $20,000 for each of the 10,000 students he claimed were in the aggrieved class of victims. Nevertheless, the federal district and appellate courts denied the class action filing, limiting the case to Phelps's initial plaintiff, Evelyn Johnson, alone.

The case fueled a national debate about racial integration of schools, and prompted the U.S. Department of Health, Education and Welfare, by 1974, to order the Topeka board to develop corrective remedies.

Topeka's school board did not contest the charges. On the guidance of its insurance provider, it settled the litigation (with no admission of wrongdoing) for $19,500—$12,400 of which went to Phelps. While the settlement drew some praise, controversy arose when the judge ordered the settlement amount sealed at the request of the insurer—apparently with Phelps's approval. (Details leaked out to the media anyway.) Phelps announced he would file more such cases, as class actions, but the insurance company stated it would not pay for any more of them.

==== Later civil rights career ====
In 1986, Phelps sued President Ronald Reagan over Reagan's appointment of a U.S. ambassador to the Vatican, alleging this violated separation of church and state. The case was dismissed by the U.S. district court.

Phelps' law firm, staffed by himself and family members, also represented non-white Kansans in discrimination actions against Kansas City Power and Light, Southwestern Bell, and the Topeka City Attorney, and represented two female professors alleging discrimination at Kansas universities.

A defeat in his civil rights suit against the City of Wichita and others, on behalf of Jesse O. Rice (the fired executive director of the Wichita Civil Rights Equal Employment Opportunity Commission), among other causes, would lead to further legal actions ending in Phelps' disbarment and censure.

In the 1980s, Phelps received awards from the Greater Kansas City Chapter of Blacks in Government and the Bonner Springs branch of the NAACP, for his work on behalf of black clients.

One of his sons, Nate, stated that Phelps largely took civil rights cases for money rather than principle. Nate said that his father "held racist attitudes" and he would use slurs against black clients: "They would come into his office and after they left, he would talk about how stupid they were and call them dumb niggers." Nate's sister, Shirley, denies his account and states their father never used racist language.

=== Disbarment ===
A formal complaint was filed against Phelps on November 8, 1977, by the Kansas State Board of Law Examiners, due to his conduct during a lawsuit, against a court reporter named Carolene Brady, who had failed to have a court transcript ready for Phelps on the day he asked for it. Although it did not affect the outcome of the case, Phelps sued her for $22,000.

In the ensuing trial, Phelps called Brady to the stand, declared her a hostile witness, and then cross-examined her for nearly a week, during which he accused her of being a "slut", tried to introduce testimony from former boyfriends whom Phelps wanted to subpoena, and accused her of a variety of perverse sexual acts, ultimately reducing her to tears on the stand.

Phelps lost the case. According to the Kansas Supreme Court:

The trial became an exhibition of a personal vendetta by Phelps against Carolene Brady. His examination was replete with repetition, badgering, innuendo, belligerence, irrelevant and immaterial matter, evidencing only a desire to hurt and destroy the defendant. The jury verdict didn't stop the onslaught of Phelps. He was not satisfied with the hurt, pain, and damage he had visited on Carolene Brady.

In an appeal, Phelps prepared affidavits swearing to the court that he had eight witnesses whose testimony would convince the court to rule in his favor. Brady obtained sworn, signed affidavits from the same eight people, all of whom said that Phelps had never contacted them and that they had no reason to testify against Brady.

Phelps was found to have made "false statements in violation of DR 7–102(A)(5)". On July 20, 1979, Phelps was permanently disbarred from practicing law in the state of Kansas, although he continued to practice in federal courts.

In 1985, nine Federal judges filed a disciplinary complaint against Phelps and five of his children, alleging false accusations against the judges. In 1989, the complaint was settled; Phelps agreed to stop practicing law in Federal court permanently, and two of his children were suspended for a period of six months and one year, respectively.

== Family life ==
Phelps married Margie M. Simms in May 1952, a year after the couple met at the Arizona Bible Institute. They had 13 children, 54 grandchildren, and 7 great-grandchildren.

Nathan Phelps, Fred Phelps' estranged son, claims that the elder Phelps was an abusive father, that he (Nate) never had a relationship with him when he was growing up, and that the Westboro Baptist Church is an organization for his father to "vent his rage and anger." He alleges that, in addition to hurting others, his father used to physically abuse his wife and children by beating them with his fists and with the handle of a mattock to the point of bleeding. Phelps' brother, Mark, has supported and repeated Nathan's claims of physical abuse by their father. Since 2004, over 20 members of the church, mostly family members, have left the church.

== Religious beliefs ==
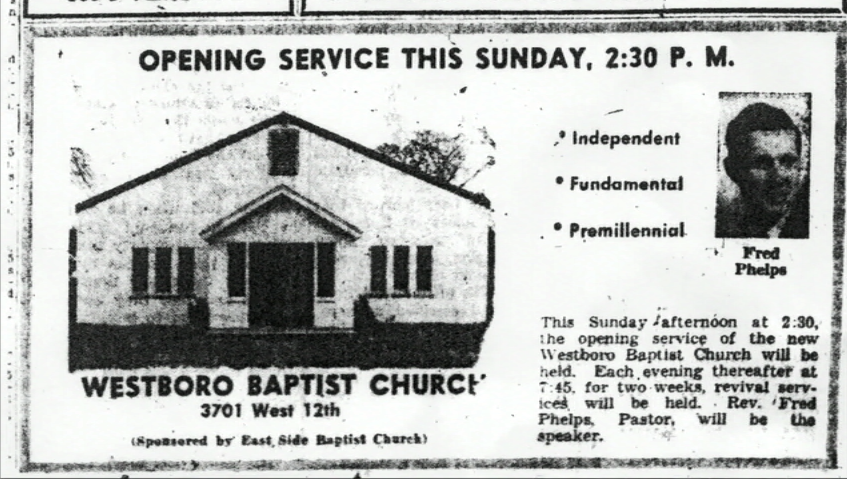
Advertisement for opening service of Westboro Baptist Church, Topeka Capital, 1955

Phelps described himself as an Old School Baptist, and stated that he held to all five points of Calvinism. Phelps particularly highlighted John Calvin's doctrine of unconditional election, the belief that God has elected certain people for salvation before birth, and limited atonement, the belief that Christ only died for the elect, and condemns those who believe otherwise. Despite claiming to be an Old School Baptist, he was ordained by a Southern Baptist church, and was rejected and generally condemned by Old School (or Primitive) Baptists.

Phelps viewed Arminianism (particularly the views of the Methodist theologian William Elbert Munsey) as a "worse blasphemy and heresy than that heard in all filthy Saturday night fag bars in the aggregate in the world".

In addition to John Calvin, Phelps admired Martin Luther and Bob Jones Sr., and approvingly quoted a statement by Jones that "what this country needs is 50 Jonathan Edwardses turned loose in it." Phelps particularly held to equal ultimacy, believing that "God Almighty makes some willing and he leads others into sin", a view he said is Calvinist.

Phelps opposed such common Baptist practices as Sunday school meetings, Bible colleges and seminaries, and multi-denominational crusades. Although he attended Bob Jones University, and worked with Billy Graham in his Los Angeles Crusade before Graham changed his views on a literal Hell and salvation, Phelps considered Graham the greatest false prophet since Balaam. He also condemned large church leaders, such as Robert Schuller and Jerry Falwell, as well as all Catholics.

== Church protest activities ==
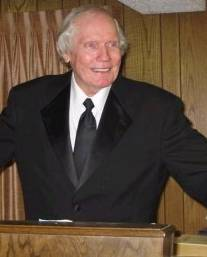
Phelps at his pulpit

All of Phelps' demonstrations and other activities during the last 50 years of his life were conducted in conjunction with the congregation of Westboro Baptist Church (WBC), an American unaffiliated Baptist church known for its extreme ideologies, especially those against gay people. The church is widely described as a hate group and is monitored as such by the Anti-Defamation League and Southern Poverty Law Center. It was headed by Phelps until his later years when he took a reduced role in the activities of the church and his family. In March 2014, church representatives said that the church had not had a defined leader in "a very long time," and church members consist primarily of his large family; in 2011, the church stated that it had about 40 members. The church is headquartered in a residential neighborhood on the west side of Topeka about three miles (5 km) west of the Kansas State Capitol. Its first public service was held on the afternoon of November 27, 1955.

The church has been involved in actions against gay people since at least 1991, when it sought a crackdown on homosexual activity at Gage Park six blocks northwest of the church. In 2001, Phelps estimated that the WBC had held 40 pickets a week for the previous 10 years. In addition to conducting anti-gay protests at military funerals, the organization pickets other celebrity funerals and public events that are likely to gain media attention. Protests have also been held against Jews, and some protests have included WBC members stomping on the American flag.

=== Lawsuit against Westboro Baptist Church ===
On March 10, 2006, WBC picketed the funeral of Marine Lance Corporal Matthew A. Snyder, who died in combat in Iraq on March 3, 2006. The Snyder family sued Fred Phelps for defamation, invasion of privacy, and intentional infliction of emotional distress.

On October 31, 2007, WBC, Fred Phelps and his two daughters, Shirley Phelps-Roper and Rebekah Phelps-Davis, were found liable for invasion of privacy and intentional infliction of emotional distress. A federal jury awarded Snyder's father $2.9 million in compensatory damages, then later added a decision to award $6 million in punitive damages for invasion of privacy and an additional $2 million for causing emotional distress (a total of $10.9 million).

The lawsuit named Albert Snyder, father of Matthew Snyder, as the plaintiff, and Fred W. Phelps Sr., Westboro Baptist Church, Inc., Rebekah Phelps-Davis, and Shirley Phelps-Roper as defendants, alleging that they were responsible for publishing defamatory information about the Snyder family on the Internet, including statements that Albert and his wife had "raised [Matthew] for the devil" and taught him "to defy his Creator, to divorce, and to commit adultery". Other statements denounced them for raising their son Catholic. Snyder further complained the defendants had intruded upon and staged protests at his son's funeral. The claims of invasion of privacy and defamation arising from comments posted about Snyder on the Westboro website were dismissed on First Amendment grounds, but the case proceeded to trial on the remaining three counts.

Albert Snyder, the father of LCpl Matthew A. Snyder, testified:

They turned this funeral into a media circus and they wanted to hurt my family. They wanted their message heard and they didn't care who they stepped over. My son should have been buried with dignity, not with a bunch of clowns outside.

In his instructions to the jury, U.S. District Judge Richard D. Bennett stated that the First Amendment protection of free speech has limits, including vulgar, offensive and shocking statements, and that the jury must decide "whether the defendant's actions would be highly offensive to a reasonable person, whether they were extreme and outrageous and whether these actions were so offensive and shocking as to not be entitled to First Amendment protection". (see also Chaplinsky v. New Hampshire, a case in which certain personal slurs and obscene utterances by an individual were found unworthy of First Amendment protection, due to the potential for violence resulting from their utterance). WBC sought a mistrial based on alleged prejudicial statements made by the judge and violations of the gag order by the plaintiff's attorney. An appeal was also sought by the WBC. On February 4, 2008, Bennett upheld the ruling but reduced the punitive damages from $8 million to $2.1 million. The total judgment then stood at $5 million. Court liens were ordered on church buildings and Phelps' law office in an attempt to ensure that the damages were paid.

An appeal by WBC was heard on September 24, 2009. The federal appeals court ruled in favor of Phelps and Westboro Baptist Church, stating that their picket near the funeral of LCpl Matthew A. Snyder is protected speech and did not violate the privacy of the service member's family, reversing the lower court's $5 million judgment. On March 30, 2010, the federal appeals court ordered Albert Snyder to pay the court costs for the Westboro Baptist Church, an amount totaling $16,510. Political commentator Bill O'Reilly agreed on March 30 to cover the costs, pending appeal.

A writ of certiorari was granted on an appeal to the Supreme Court of the United States, and the oral argument for the case took place on October 6, 2010. Margie Phelps, one of Fred Phelps' children, represented the Westboro Baptist Church.

The Court ruled in favor of Phelps in an 8–1 decision, holding that the protesters' speech related to a public issue, and was disseminated on a public sidewalk. Chief Justice John Roberts wrote, for the majority, "As a nation we have chosen ... to protect even hurtful speech on public issues to ensure that we do not stifle public debate." Justice Samuel Alito, the lone dissenter, wrote, "Our profound national commitment to free and open debate is not a license for the vicious verbal assault that occurred in this case."

=== Efforts to discourage funeral protests ===
On May 24, 2006, the United States House and Senate passed the Respect for America's Fallen Heroes Act, which President George W. Bush signed five days later. The act bans protests within 300 feet (91 m) of national cemeteries – which numbered 122 when the bill was signed – from an hour before a funeral to an hour after it. Violators face up to a $100,000 fine and up to a year in prison.

On August 6, 2012, President Obama signed Pub. L. 112–154 (text) (PDF), the Honoring America's Veterans and Caring for Camp Lejeune Families Act of 2012 which, among other things, requires a 300-foot (91 m) and 2-hour buffer zone around military funerals.

As of April 2006, nine states had passed laws regarding protests near funeral sites immediately before and after ceremonies:

- Illinois
- Indiana
- Iowa
- Kansas
- Kentucky
- Louisiana
- Maryland
- Michigan
- Missouri

States that are considering laws are:

- Nebraska
- Ohio
- Oklahoma
- South Carolina
- South Dakota
- Texas
- Vermont
- Virginia
- West Virginia
- Wisconsin

Florida increased the penalty for disturbing military funerals, amending a previous ban on the disruption of lawful assembly.

On January 11, 2011, Arizona passed an emergency measure which prohibits protests within 300 feet (91 m) of any funeral services, in response to an announcement by the WBC that it planned to protest at 2011 Tucson shooting victim Christina Green's funeral.

These bans have been contested. Bart McQueary, having protested with Phelps on at least three occasions, filed a lawsuit in federal court challenging the constitutionality of Kentucky's funeral protest ban. On September 26, 2006, a district court agreed and entered an injunction prohibiting the ban from being enforced. In the opinion, the judge wrote:

Sections 5(1)(b) and (c) restrict substantially more speech than that which would interfere with a funeral or that which would be so obtrusive that funeral participants could not avoid it. Accordingly, the provisions are not narrowly tailored to serve a significant government interest but are instead unconstitutionally overbroad.

The American Civil Liberties Union filed a lawsuit in Missouri on behalf of Phelps and Westboro Baptist Church to overturn the ban on the picketing of soldier's funerals. The ACLU of Ohio also filed a similar lawsuit.

In the case of Snyder v. Phelps, the 4th Circuit Court of Appeals ruled that "distasteful and repugnant" protests surrounding funerals of service members were protected by the First Amendment. But attorneys for the service member's family appealed the decision on the grounds that such speech should not be allowed to inflict emotional distress on private parties exercising their freedom of religion during a funeral service. The Supreme Court heard oral arguments in the case on October 6, 2010, and ruled 8–1 in favor of Phelps in an opinion released on March 2, 2011. The court held that "any distress occasioned by Westboro's picketing turned on the content and viewpoint of the message conveyed, rather than any interference with the funeral itself" and thus could not be restricted.

=== People targeted by Phelps ===
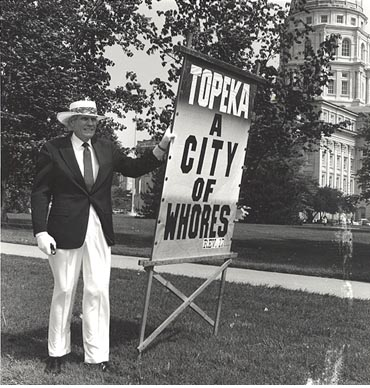
Phelps picketing outside the Kansas State Capitol

Beginning in the early 1990s, Phelps targeted numerous individuals and groups in the public eye for criticism by the Westboro Baptist Church.

Prominent examples include President Ronald Reagan, Princess Diana, Supreme Court Chief Justice William Rehnquist, National Football League star Reggie White, Sonny Bono, comedian George Carlin, The Church of Jesus Christ of Latter-day Saints, atheists, Muslims, murdered college student Matthew Shepard, children's television host Fred Rogers, American televangelist Tammy Faye Bakker, Heath Ledger, Jon Stewart, Stephen Colbert, Bill O'Reilly, filmmaker Richard Rossi, film critic Roger Ebert, Catholics, Australians, Swedes, the Irish, and US soldiers killed in Iraq. He also targeted the Joseph Estabrook Elementary School in Lexington, Massachusetts, center of the David Parker controversy.

Phelps also picketed memorials to victims of different mass shootings, including the spreading of unfounded theories, such as saying that Eric Harris and Dylan Klebold, the perpetrators of the 1999 Columbine High School massacre, were gay, saying that "Two filthy fags slaughtered 13 people at Columbine High."

In 2006, in the aftermath of the West Nickel Mines School shooting, where five Amish girls were murdered, Phelps mocked the shooting, saying that it had been caused by Pennsylvania Governor Ed Rendell's criticism of Westboro. Phelps further planned a protest at the funeral for the five girls murdered, but called it off, opting to spread their messages on a local radio station instead.

Phelps continued picketing funerals and memorials for victims of mass shootings during the late 2000s, including the plan to picket the memorial for two victims of the Northern Illinois University shooting in 2008, which was countered by a preacher who hosted a seminar against Phelps' views. After Phelps announced plans, as aforementioned, to picket the funeral of the youngest victim of the 2011 Tucson shooting on Congresswoman Gabby Giffords, Phelps responded to the emergency legislation which banned him from doing so, by praising the shooter, Jared Lee Loughner, saying: "Thank God for the violent shooter", and labeled Loughner as a "hero". In 2007, he stated that he would target Jerry Falwell's funeral.

Phelps' daughter, Shirley Phelps-Roper, has appeared on Fox News Channel, defending the WBC and attacking homosexuality. She and her children have also appeared on the Howard Stern radio show attempting to promote their agenda and church. Phelps' followers have repeatedly protested the University of Kansas School of Law's graduation ceremonies.

In August 2007, in the wake of the Minneapolis I-35W bridge collapse, Phelps and his congregation stated that they would protest at the funerals of the victims. In a statement, the church said that Minneapolis is the "land of the Sodomite damned".

== Political activities ==
=== Anti-gay ===
In the movie Hatemongers, members of the Westboro Baptist Church state their children were being "accosted" by homosexuals in Gage Park, about a 1/2 mile (800 m) from the Phelps' home and a mile (1.6 km) northwest of Westboro Baptist Church. Shirley Phelps-Roper says that, in the late 1980s, Fred Phelps claimed to have witnessed a homosexual attempting to lure her then five-year-old son Joshua into some shrubbery. After several complaints to the local government about the large amount of homosexual sex occurring in the park, with no resulting action, the Phelpses put up signs warning of homosexual activity. This resulted in much negative attention for the family. When the Phelpses called on local churches to speak against the activity in Gage Park, the churches also lashed out against the Phelps family, leading to the family protesting homosexuality on a regular basis.

In 2005, Phelps and his family, along with several other local congregations, held a signature drive to bring about a vote to repeal two city ordinances that added sexual orientation to a definition of hate crimes and banned the city itself from workplace discrimination based on sexual orientation. Enough signatures were collected to bring the measure to a vote. Topeka voters defeated the repeal measure on March 1, 2005, by a 53–47% margin. In the same election, Phelps' granddaughter Jael was an unsuccessful candidate for the Topeka City Council, seeking to replace Tiffany Muller, the first openly gay member of the council.

=== Electoral politics ===
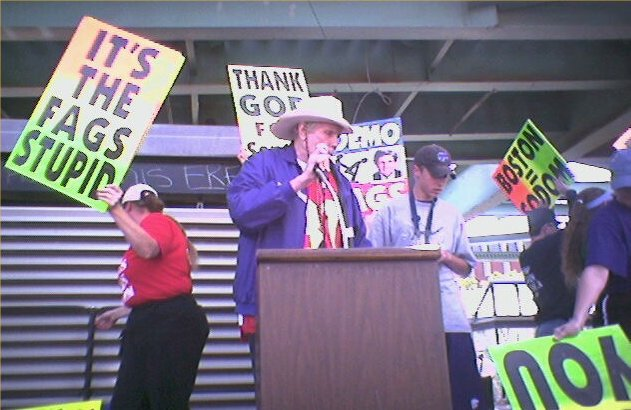
Phelps speaking at a picket at the 2004 Democratic National Convention

Phelps ran in Kansas Democratic Party primaries five times, but never won. These included races for governor in 1990, 1994, and 1998, receiving about 15 percent of the vote in 1998. In the 1992 Democratic Party primary for U.S. Senate, Phelps received 31 percent of the vote. Phelps ran for mayor of Topeka in 1993 and 1997.

Phelps and the WBC actively supported Al Gore in the 1988 Democratic Party presidential primary election, with reports stating that Phelps and his church provided housing and other support for campaign workers in Kansas. Phelps' son, Fred Phelps Jr., was selected to be one of Gore's delegates from Kansas at the Democratic Party Convention in Atlanta. In his 1984 Senate campaign, Gore ran on a platform that included opposition to a "gay bill of rights" and stated that homosexuality was not something that "society should affirm." By 2000, Gore had publicly changed his official stance on gay rights to more closely align with the mainstream of the Democratic Party. Phelps stated that he supported Gore because of these earlier comments.

In 1996 Phelps opposed Clinton's (and Gore's) re-election because of the administration's support for gay rights; the Westboro congregation picketed a 1997 inaugural ball.

=== Saddam Hussein ===
In 1997, Phelps wrote a letter to Iraqi President Saddam Hussein, praising his regime for being "the only Muslim state that allows the Gospel of our Lord Jesus Christ to be freely and openly preached on the streets".

== Arrests and traveling restrictions ==
=== United States ===
In 1994, Phelps was convicted of disorderly conduct for verbal harassment, and received two suspended 30-day jail sentences.

Phelps' 1995 conviction for assault and battery carried a five-year prison sentence, with a mandatory 18 months to be served before he became eligible for parole. Phelps fought to be allowed to remain free until his appeals process went through. Days away from being arrested and sent to prison, a judge ruled that Phelps had been denied a speedy trial and that he was not required to serve any time.

=== Canada ===
In August 2008, Canadian officials learned of WBC's intent to stage a protest at the funeral of Tim McLean, a Winnipeg resident who was killed on a bus. The protests intended to convey the message that the man's murder was God's response to Canadian laws permitting abortion, homosexuality, divorce and remarriage. In response, Canadian officials barred the organization's members from entering the country.

=== United Kingdom ===
On February 18, 2009, two days before the Westboro Baptist Church's first UK picket, the United Kingdom Home Office announced that Fred Phelps and Shirley Phelps-Roper would be refused entry and that "other church members could also be flagged and stopped if they tried to enter Britain". In May 2009, he and his daughter Shirley were placed on the Home Office's list of people barred from entering the UK for "fostering hatred which might lead to inter-community violence".

== In the media ==
In 1993, Phelps appeared on a first-season episode of the talk show Ricki Lake, alleging that homosexuals and "anyone who carries the AIDS virus" deserved to die. When Phelps and his son-in-law Charles Hockenbarger (married to Phelps' daughter Rachel) became increasingly belligerent, Lake ordered the Phelps family to leave the studio. During a commercial break, the two were forced off the set and escorted out of the building by security. After Phelps died, Lake tweeted that when he had been on the show, he had told her that she worshipped her own rectum — a remark that led her to take action off-stage to have Phelps removed from the set.

The Phelps family was the subject of the 2007 TV program The Most Hated Family in America, presented on the BBC by Louis Theroux. Four years after his original documentary, Theroux produced a follow-up program America's Most Hated Family in Crisis, which was prompted by news of family members leaving the church. Phelps' son Nate has broken ranks with the family and in an interview with Peter W. Klein on the Canadian program The Standard, he characterized his father as abusive and warned the Phelps family could turn violent. Writing in response to Phelps' death in 2014, Theroux described Phelps as "an angry bigot who thrived on conflict", and expressed the view that his death would not lead to any "huge changes" in the church, as he saw it as operating with the dynamics of a large family rather than a cult. Theroux returned for a third documentary in 2019, titled Surviving America's Most Hated Family.

Kevin Smith produced a horror film titled Red State featuring a religious fundamentalist villain inspired by Phelps.

Phelps appeared in A Union in Wait, a 2001 Sundance Channel documentary film about same-sex marriage, directed by Ryan Butler after Phelps picketed Wake Forest Baptist Church at Wake Forest University over a proposed same-sex union ceremony.

== Excommunication and death ==
Fred Phelps preached his final Sunday sermon on September 1, 2013. Five weeks later, sermons resumed from various members.

On March 15, 2014, Nathan Phelps, Phelps' estranged son, reported that Phelps was in very poor health and was receiving hospice care. He said that Phelps had been excommunicated from the church in August 2013, and then moved into a house where he "basically stopped eating and drinking". His statements were supported by his brother, Mark. Church spokesman Steve Drain declined to answer questions about Phelps' excommunication, and denied that the church had a single leader. The church's official website said that membership status is private and did not confirm or deny the excommunication.

Phelps died of natural causes shortly before midnight on March 19, 2014, at the age of 84. His daughter, Shirley, stated that a funeral for her father would not be held because the church does not "worship the dead". According to Nathan Phelps, Fred Phelps' body was immediately cremated, and according to his granddaughter Megan Phelps-Roper, Phelps' cremated remains were buried in an unmarked grave in Kansas.

Phelps had been reportedly suffering from some form of dementia in his final year, and started behaving irrationally. This led to church members believing that God had condemned him. It has been stated that Phelps "had a softening of heart at the end of his life," according to accounts published in a memoir written by Phelps' granddaughter Megan Phelps-Roper, and reporting from The New Yorker citing former members of the church. This includes an incident in 2013, in which Phelps is said to have stepped outside the church and called over to members of Planting Peace, a nonprofit organization that bought a house on the other street and painted it with an LGBTQ rainbow, saying: "You're good people!" In an interview with NPR, Megan Phelps-Roper said this outburst was "the proximate cause" of Phelps being excommunicated, a claim that the church has denied. According to Phelps' grandson and former church member Zach Phelps-Roper, Phelps' actions were regarded as "rank blasphemy" by the church members.

== Electoral history ==
Democratic primary for Governor of Kansas, 1990

- Joan Finney: 81,250 (47.18%)
- John Carlin: 79,406 (46.11%)
- Fred Phelps: 11,572 (6.72%)

Democratic primary for United States Senate, Kansas 1992

- Gloria O'Dell: 111,015 (69.20%)
- Fred Phelps: 49,416 (30.80%)

Democratic primary for Governor of Kansas, 1994

- Jim Slattery: 84,389 (53.02%)
- Joan Wagnon: 42,115 (26.46%)
- Jim Francisco: 16,048 (10.08%)
- Leslie Kitchenmaster: 11,253 (7.07%)
- Fred Phelps: 5,349 (3.36%)

Democratic primary for Governor of Kansas, 1998

- Tom Sawyer: 88,248 (85.28%)
- Fred Phelps: 15,233 (14.72%)

== Family tree ==
Fred Phelps family tree

Catherine Idalette	Fred Wade Phelps
Fred Waldron Phelps	Margie Marie Simms
Rachel Phelps Hockenbarger	Shirley Phelps-Roper	Jonathan Baxter Phelps	Timothy Bryan Phelps	Rebekah Phelps Davis	Fred Waldron Phelps Jr.	Abigail Phelps	Margie Jean Phelps	Elizabeth Marie Phelps	Nate Phelps	Katherine Phelps	Mark Phelps	Dorotha Phelps
Samuel Phelps-Roper	Isaiah Phelps-Roper	Rebekah Phelps-Roper	Zacharia Phelps-Roper	Joshua Phelps-Roper	Megan Phelps-Roper	Libby Phelps

== See also ==
- Burke family (Castlebar)
- Christian terrorism
- Christianity and homosexuality
- Hate group
- The Bible and homosexuality
