= 1992 United States Senate election in Kansas =

- November 3, 1992
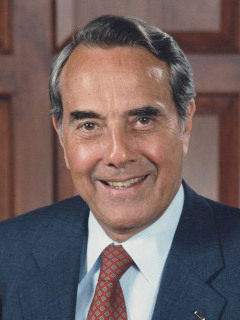

Nominee	Bob Dole	Gloria O'Dell
Party	Republican	Democratic
Popular vote	706,246	349,525
Percentage	62.70%	31.03%
- County results Dole: 40–50% 50–60% 60–70% 70–80%
U.S. senator before election
Bob Dole
Republican
Elected U.S. Senator
Bob Dole
Republican

The 1992 United States Senate election in Kansas was held on November 3, 1992. Incumbent Republican Senator Bob Dole ran for re-election to a fifth term, defeating Gloria O'Dell, the Democratic nominee, in a landslide. Dole would ultimately not serve out his full six-year term, and resigned in 1996 to focus on his unsuccessful presidential campaign, triggering a special election.

== Democratic primary ==
=== Candidates ===
- Gloria O'Dell, special assistant to State Treasurer Sally Thompson, campaign operative
- Fred Phelps, Westboro Baptist Church founder, disbarred lawyer

=== Results ===
Democratic primary results
Party	Candidate	Votes	%
Democratic	Gloria O'Dell	111,015	69.20%
Democratic	Fred Phelps	49,416	30.80%
Total votes		160,431	100.00%

== Republican primary ==
=== Candidates ===
- Bob Dole, incumbent U.S. Senator
- Richard Warren Rodewald, retired auto worker

=== Results ===
Republican primary results
Party	Candidate	Votes	%
Republican	Bob Dole (inc.)	244,480	80.40%
Republican	Richard Warren Rodewald	59,589	19.60%
Total votes		304,069	100.00%

== General election ==
=== Results ===
1992 United States Senate election in Kansas
Party	Candidate	Votes	%	±%
Republican	Bob Dole (inc.)	706,246	62.70%	−7.35%
Democratic	Gloria O'Dell	349,525	31.03%	+1.08%
Independent	Christina Campbell-Cline	45,423	4.03%	—
Libertarian	Mark B. Kirk	25,253	2.24%	—
Majority		356,721	31.67%	−8.43%
Total votes		1,126,447	100.00%	
Republican hold				

== See also ==
- 1992 United States Senate elections
