= Wake Forest Baptist Church, Winston-Salem =

Coordinates: 35.97960°N 78.51026°W

Wake Forest Baptist Church was a progressive Baptist church located on the campus of Wake Forest University in Winston-Salem, North Carolina. The church belonged to the Alliance of Baptists, Association of Welcoming and Affirming Baptists, Baptist Peace Fellowship of North America and the Cooperative Baptist Fellowship.

The church was established in 1956, when Wake Forest College relocated from Wake Forest, North Carolina, to Winston-Salem.

On August 8, 2022, interim pastor Rayce Lamb said in a letter that the church would soon dissolve because members were getting older and due to the university's "new rental policy". The church officially dissolved following a celebration of life service on November 5, 2022.

== History ==
Wake Forest Baptist Church began in 1835 on the Wake Forest Institute campus in Wake Forest, North Carolina. That church continues in Wake Forest even after Wake Forest University has relocated. The Winston-Salem congregation began in 1956 when the college moved from Wake Forest.

The church was located in Wingate Hall, which houses the Department of Religion and the School of Divinity at Wake Forest University. The congregation held their services in Wait Chapel, the auditorium for the university. When the church was founded, most of the student body, faculty and administration was Baptist. Over the years, the percentage of Baptists on campus had decreased significantly, and the church looked increasingly to the community for its membership.

With the North Carolina Baptist Hospital, the church founded the local Meals on Wheels ministry and helped to establish the Association for the Betterment of Children. More recently, its members were responsible for the establishment of the organization C.H.A.N.G.E., which includes 40 congregations and neighborhood associations.

The church had an open membership policy that honored the baptism of all who have professed faith in Jesus Christ. They baptized by immersion those who first made this profession in their congregation.

Although Wake Forest University ended ties with the Baptist State Convention of North Carolina in 1986, the church continued its relationship with the university.

In 1994, Wake Forest Baptist Church was presented the Whitney M. Young Award for "bridging the gaps in race relations" by the Winston-Salem Urban League. A year later, the United Way of Forsyth County, NC presented a special award to Wake Forest Baptist Church and its partner, First Baptist Church, Highland Avenue, for building "a better community through a variety of joint undertakings."

In 2006, Wake Forest Baptist Church won the PFLAG of Winston-Salem Faith Community Kaleidoscope Award. In 2007, the Individual Kaleidoscope Award was presented to the pastor, Susan Parker. According to a November 17, 2007 article in the Winston-Salem Journal, the church was a major supporter of Habitat for Humanity of Forsyth County and is helping build homes in the city.

From 2011 to 2013, Parker and Angela Yarber, who are both lesbians, served as co-pastors.

Lia Scholl, pastor from 2014 to 2021, participated in Poor People's Campaign protests in Raleigh, North Carolina and Washington, D.C. and was arrested.

In 2021, the university told the church that by 2023, it would have to pay $2,500 a month for use of Davis Chapel, which seats 90. On August 7, 2022, with average attendance down from hundreds to about 30 according to interim pastor Rayce Lamb, members voted to dissolve the congregation. On November 5, 2022, the church held a celebration of life service, following which it officially dissolved. During this service, the church announced legacy gifts to the Wake Forest University School of Divinity and the Winston-Salem Foundation.

== Affiliation ==
Due to its position on LGBTQIA equality in the church, and the church's decision in 2000 to perform a union for a lesbian couple, the church was removed from membership in the Pilot Mountain Baptist Association and the Baptist State Convention of North Carolina. The church voluntarily left the Southern Baptist Convention. The church belonged to the Alliance of Baptists, Association of Welcoming and Affirming Baptists, Baptist Peace Fellowship of North America and the Cooperative Baptist Fellowship.

== Leadership ==
Warren T. Carr, a former civil rights proponent, served as pastor of the church from 1964 to 1985. Carr was frequently an adversary of Southern Baptist Convention officials.

Richard Groves became the church's pastor after serving as a pastor in Texas and Massachusetts. He retired October 31, 2008 after working at the church for 23 years.

In January 2011, Angela Yarber joined the pastoral ministry team at WFBC. Yarber also serves Wake Forest University as a campus minister.

Since 2004, Susan Parker has served as the pastor of the church's pastoral ministries. In the late 1990s, it was her union ceremony that sparked controversy. The controversy served as the subject of the documentary A Union in Wait. Groves and Parker have both signed the petition of the North Carolina Coalition for Marriage Equality.

== See also ==
- Alliance of Baptists
- Association of Welcoming and Affirming Baptists
- Baptist Peace Fellowship of North America
- LGBT-affirming Christian denominations
- LGBT-affirming religious groups
