= Megan Phelps-Roper =

American political activist (born 1986)

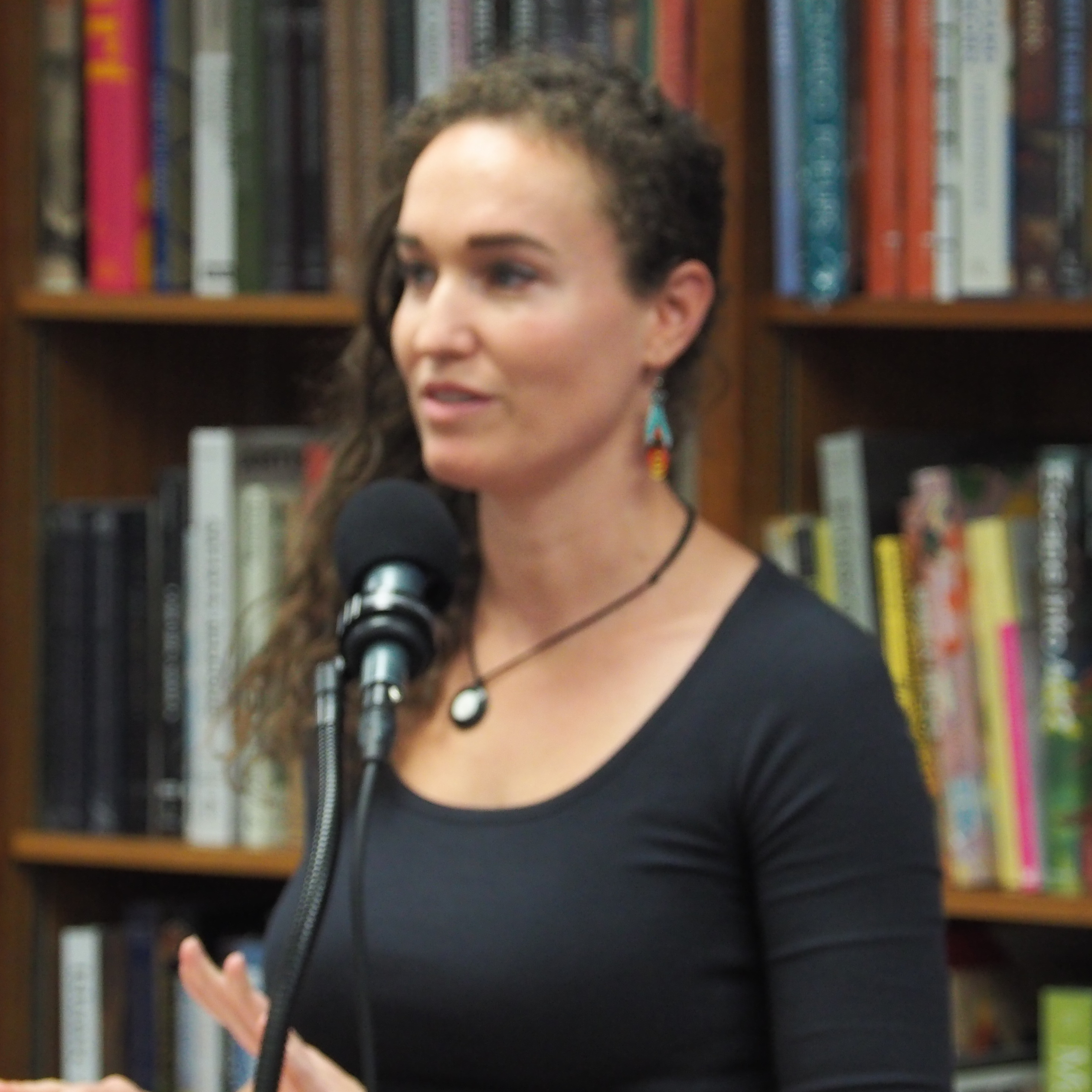
- Phelps-Roper giving a TED Talk in January 2017 in New York City
- Born: January 31, 1986 (age 40); Topeka, Kansas, U.S.
- Education: Washburn University
- Known for: Leaving and publicly criticizing the Westboro Baptist Church
- Spouse: Chad Fjelland
- Children: 2
- Mother: Shirley Phelps-Roper
- Relatives: Fred Phelps (grandfather); Nathan Phelps (uncle)

Megan Phelps-Roper (born January 31, 1986) is an American political activist who was formerly a member of, and spokesperson for, the Westboro Baptist Church, a Hyper-Calvinist Christian sect, widely regarded as a hate group. Her mother is Shirley Phelps-Roper, and her grandfather is the church's founder, Fred Phelps. She grew up in Topeka, Kansas, in a compound with other members of the church. As a child, she was taught the Westboro Baptist Church doctrine and participated in the church's pickets against homosexuality, the American response to the September 11 terrorist attacks, and the funerals of soldiers who died in the war in Afghanistan and the Iraq War. In 2009, she became active on Twitter to preach the church's doctrine. Phelps-Roper began to doubt her beliefs when Twitter users pointed out contradictions in the Westboro Baptist Church's doctrine, and when elders changed the church's decision-making process.

Phelps-Roper left the church in 2012 after she was unable to reconcile her doubts with her beliefs. Following her departure, Phelps-Roper became a prominent critic of the church's philosophy and practices. She travels around the world to speak about her experience in the church and advocates dialogue between groups with conflicting views. In 2019, she released the memoir Unfollow: A Journey from Hatred to Hope.

== Biography ==
=== Early life within Westboro Baptist Church ===
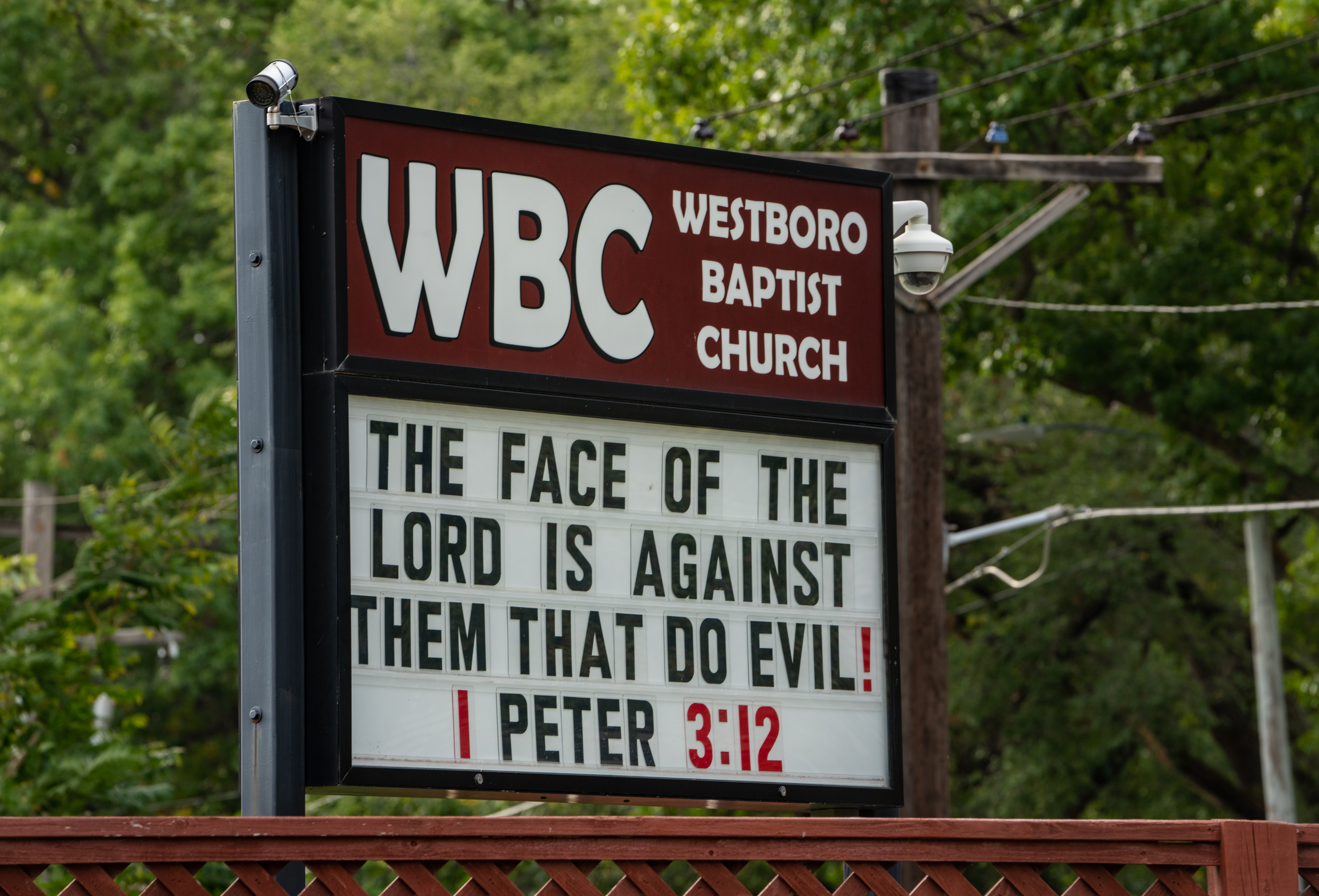
Phelps-Roper was raised in the Westboro Baptist Church (church sign pictured).

Megan Phelps-Roper was born on January 31, 1986, and is the eldest daughter of Shirley Phelps-Roper and Brent Roper. Her grandfather was Fred Phelps, who founded the Westboro Baptist Church, a Christian sect based on the members' Calvinist interpretation of the Bible and categorized by the Southern Poverty Law Center as a hate group. Her parents taught her the doctrine of the Westboro Baptist Church from an early age. She grew up on a compound in Topeka, Kansas, that was owned by other church members. When Phelps-Roper was 13, her grandfather baptized her into the Westboro Baptist Church.

After graduating from Washburn University, Phelps-Roper worked at her family's law firm, Phelps Chartered, as a business administrator. She also appeared as a regular guest on the Kansas City morning show Afentra's Big Fat Morning Buzz. In 2011, Phelps-Roper appeared in Louis Theroux's documentary America's Most Hated Family in Crisis, in which she described her contact with four Dutch filmmakers. After watching the documentary, her father insisted that she block the filmmakers on Twitter and limit her time on the social media platform. Phelps-Roper complied, reasoning that removing her focus from earthly matters would increase her spirituality. During this period, her mother was accused of not following church doctrine, and Phelps-Roper replaced her as the scheduler for the church's picketing demonstrations.

=== Leaving the Westboro Baptist Church ===
Phelps-Roper has stated that as an adult, she doubted the church's doctrine and noted the existence of many contradictions within the church's beliefs. David Abitbol, a Jewish Twitter user, pointed out the contradictions which he perceived in the church's doctrine, including the fact that the church advocated the death penalty for people who have a child out of wedlock while Phelps-Roper's mother was not married when her first child was born. Phelps-Roper stopped carrying signs which called for the death penalty for sins, but also stopped communicating with Abitbol so that he could not further challenge her beliefs.

Another point of contention that Phelps-Roper cited as increasing her doubts was how decision-making within the church changed. Previously, the church had employed a consensus decision-making model, and women had influential roles in this process. In 2011, a council of nine male church elders met separately from other members and decided to make church decisions by themselves. Later, a member was asked to leave the church by a majority vote instead of unanimous consent. Phelps-Roper felt that both events violated the church's interpretation of scripture and went against the group's concept of leadership.

In November 2012, Brent Roper confronted Phelps-Roper's sister Grace about a relationship which Grace was having with another church member. During this discussion, Phelps-Roper encouraged her sister to leave the church with her, and they announced their intention to their parents. The two sisters spent one night in Topeka where they stayed in the basement of a former teacher before they moved into their cousin's home in Lawrence, Kansas. In February 2013, she announced that she had left the church after its members planned to stage protests at the funerals of the victims of the Sandy Hook Elementary School shooting. She stated that she did not want others to believe that her lack of response to the protests constituted tacit approval of the church's actions.

=== Life after leaving Westboro Baptist Church ===
Phelps-Roper and her sister moved to South Dakota after visiting the Black Hills. She is married to Chad Fjelland, an attorney whom she met through Twitter while advocating for the Westboro Baptist Church. Her daughter was born in 2018. In October 2022, Phelps-Roper tweeted that she and Fjelland had had a son.

In 2019, Phelps-Roper appeared in Louis Theroux's third documentary about the Westboro Baptist Church, Surviving America's Most Hated Family. During the taping, Theroux informed Phelps-Roper that two of her siblings were engaged to be married, which upset her greatly. Theroux was criticized for including this scene in the documentary, with the reviewer Lucy Mangan writing that the revelation exploited Phelps-Roper's emotions and was uncomfortable to watch. Phelps-Roper defended Theroux's inclusion of the footage, stating that she wanted her family members to see her unfiltered reaction to this information. In October 2019, Phelps-Roper released a memoir called Unfollow: A Journey from Hatred to Hope, which details her upbringing and her decision to leave the Westboro Baptist Church. (It has also been issued as Unfollow: a memoir of loving and leaving the Westboro Baptist Church and as Unfollow: A Memoir of Loving and Leaving Extremism.) In 2023, Phelps-Roper hosted a podcast called The Witch Trials of J. K. Rowling, which explored author J. K. Rowling's history, including attacks from both the political right and left in claims that her books promoted witchcraft and regarding her controversial views surrounding transgender people, respectively. The seven-part podcast was supported by interviews with Rowling herself.

== Activism ==
=== Westboro Baptist Church activism ===
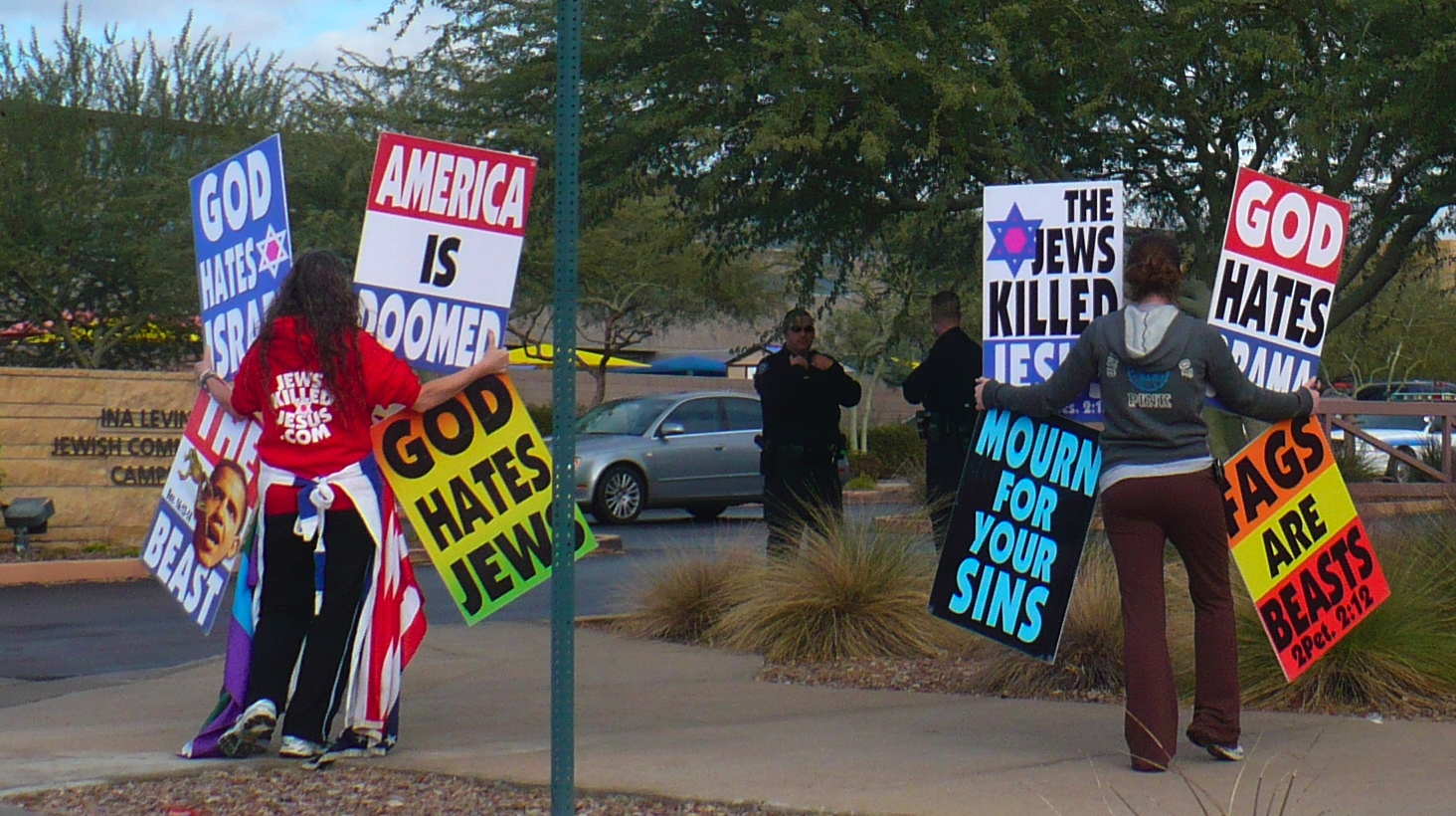
When Phelps-Roper was a member of Westboro Baptist, she held signs like the ones seen in this photo.

Phelps-Roper participated in her first protest with the church against homosexuality when she was five years old. Early pickets took place in Gage Park, Topeka, as part of her grandfather's campaign to stop homosexuals from allegedly engaging in sexual acts at the park. She participated in protests related to significant historical events, including the funeral of Matthew Shepard, the September 11 terrorist attacks, and the AIDS pandemic. She also picketed her public school, and local sporting events.

At 11, Phelps-Roper gave her first live interview to radio DJs, who had called her house wanting to interview her mother. When interviewers wanted the perspective of a younger member of the church, her mother would often have them interview Phelps-Roper. She participated in interviews with local news stations, documentary filmmakers, and national talk shows, including The Howard Stern Show.

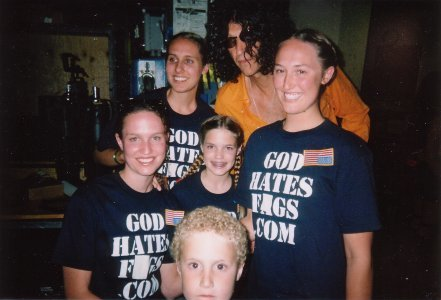
Phelps-Roper appeared with her family on the Howard Stern Show, pictured here in 2004.

In 2008, Phelps-Roper joined Twitter and became an active member in 2009 after someone asked if the church was using the service. Phelps-Roper preached the church's doctrine to celebrities and prominent users of the platform. In the late 2000s, Phelps-Roper sent messages to prominent Jewish Twitter users, calling for them to repent and stop their Jewish rituals before they were sent to Hell.

In 2010, Phelps-Roper filed a lawsuit claiming that Nebraska's law against desecrating the American flag infringed on her free speech rights. A federal judge overturned the law, and Phelps-Roper was awarded $8,000 for her attorney fees, paid by the state of Nebraska.

Phelps-Roper and her family created parodies of pop-culture songs to spread Westboro Baptist Church's theology. One of their parodies was "Ever Burn", based on the Lady Gaga song "Telephone". The parody, sung by Phelps-Roper, changed the lyrics to claim that God will not listen to Lady Gaga's prayers and that she will be sent to Hell.

=== Post-Westboro activism ===
Phelps-Roper has spoken at festivals to groups that she previously protested against, including the Jewlicious Festival in Long Beach, California, and a Jewish cultural festival in Montreal. In October 2015, she spoke at the Anti-Defamation League's Youth Leadership Conference. In January 2017, she presented a TED talk discussing her experiences growing up within the church and her decision to leave. In June 2017, she appeared on The Joe Rogan Experience podcast and in 2018 appeared in the first episode of I Love You, America with Sarah Silverman.

== Beliefs ==
Phelps-Roper has stated that she believes that the Bible was not written by people under the Christian God's inspiration. Instead, she argues that it is a document of people trying to understand how to be good, and that other philosophies were developed with the same goals. In a November 2019 interview on Amanpour & Company, she stated that she was a "believer in humanity" and in that sense still classified herself as a believer. She also said that she avoids using the word "cult" to describe the Westboro Baptist Church because she was able to leave without experiencing great difficulty. Regarding speech on social media, Phelps-Roper has advocated that Twitter disable bots and remove posts that advocate harm to others and that companies hold public debates on controversial ideas rather than removing them from their platforms.

== Family tree ==
Fred Phelps family tree

Catherine Idalette	Fred Wade Phelps
Fred Waldron Phelps	Margie Marie Simms
Rachel Phelps Hockenbarger	Shirley Phelps-Roper	Jonathan Baxter Phelps	Timothy Bryan Phelps	Rebekah Phelps Davis	Fred Waldron Phelps Jr.	Abigail Phelps	Margie Jean Phelps	Elizabeth Marie Phelps	Nate Phelps	Katherine Phelps	Mark Phelps	Dorotha Phelps
Samuel Phelps-Roper	Isaiah Phelps-Roper	Rebekah Phelps-Roper	Zacharia Phelps-Roper	Joshua Phelps-Roper	Megan Phelps-Roper	Libby Phelps

== See also ==
- Lauren Drain
- Nathan Phelps
