= Nathan Phelps =

American-Canadian activist (born 1958)

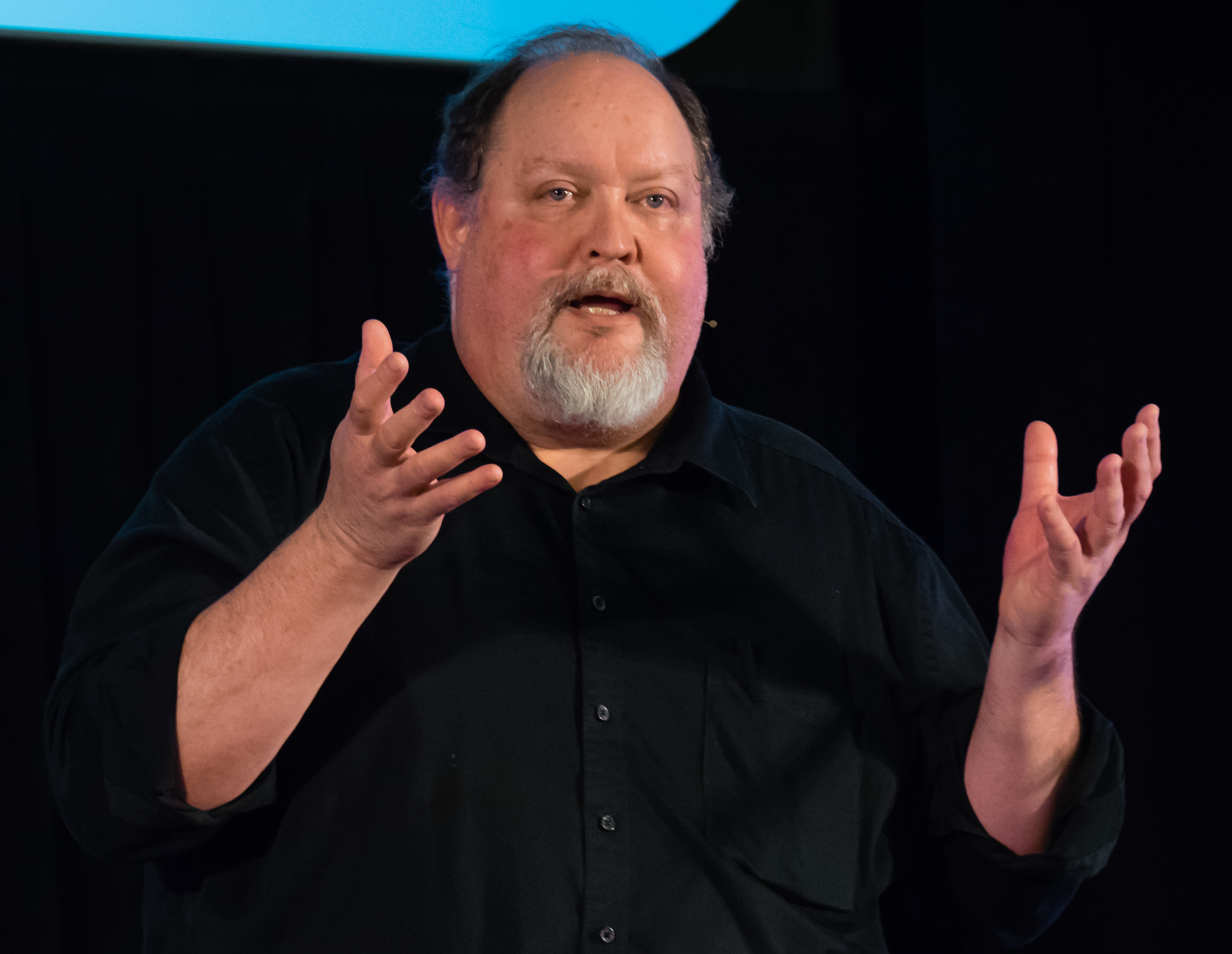
- Phelps speaking at QED, Manchester, UK in 2014
- Born: November 22, 1958 (age 67); Topeka, Kansas, U.S.
- Known for: LGBT rights activist, Atheist activist, Calgary branch director for the Centre for Inquiry Canada, son of former Westboro Baptist Church pastor Fred Phelps
- Children: 6 (3 stepchildren)
- Father: Fred Phelps
- Relatives: Shirley Phelps-Roper (sister); Megan Phelps-Roper (niece)

Nathan Phelps (born November 22, 1958) is an American-born Canadian author, LGBT rights activist, and public speaker on the topics of religion and child abuse. He is the sixth-born of the 13 children of Fred Phelps, from whom he was estranged from the time of his 18th birthday in 1976 until his father's death in 2014. Phelps left his family home when he turned 18, and permanently left the Westboro Baptist Church four years later in 1980. He has since publicly censured the group.

== Early life ==
Phelps was born in Topeka, Kansas on November 22, 1958, to Fred and Margie Phelps. Although he attended a local public school, beyond that his life revolved around his father's Westboro Baptist Church (WBC), which adjoined their family home inside a walled compound. Attendance at scheduled sermons was strictly enforced, and after-school time was largely committed to raising money for the Church through selling candy. Later this was eclipsed by participation in his father's intensive exercise program, which would routinely involve Phelps and his siblings running 5 or 10 miles (8–16 km) after school, accompanied by participation in a fad diet.

Phelps describes his father as "deeply prejudiced", violent, and abusive, and gives accounts of receiving extended beatings with a leather strap and later with a mattock handle. Nathan's brother Mark and sister Dortha have corroborated his claims of physical abuse by their father.

== Leaving Westboro ==
On his 18th birthday, Phelps left his family home. Still in internal conflict, he abandoned his family and the WBC, despite his then deeply-held belief that this meant he would go immediately to hell. In great fear of having his escape interrupted by his abusive father, Phelps made a clandestine nighttime getaway in an old car he had bought specifically for this purpose, with little plan or preparation beyond this. He slept the first night in the men's room of a nearby gas station.

Phelps left WBC prior to the start of the Church's high-profile picketing activities, and has attributed the onset of Church picketing to his father's exclusion from the legal profession.

Phelps has been criticized by members of his family still active in the Westboro Baptist Church. His sister Shirley Phelps-Roper, a prominent spokesperson for the Church, said "Nathan Phelps is a rebel against God. He has nothing to look forward to except sorrow, misery, death, and hell", and stated that he "left when he was a raging disobedient rebel with selective memory". His only encounter with his father since 1980 was on a radio talk program, on which Fred Phelps was highly critical of his son.

Westboro Baptist Church has itself been widely criticized, and has been described as "roundly derided" and "widely rebuked and criticized" by Christian groups which distance WBC's views from their own, and in other cases WBC is accused of "misreading" and "misrepresenting" the Bible. Phelps has responded to this position arguing that WBC's position was derived by his father from bona fide Biblical text and has written on the wider subject of mainstream Christianity's rejection of extremists.

== Kansas and California: From faith to atheism ==
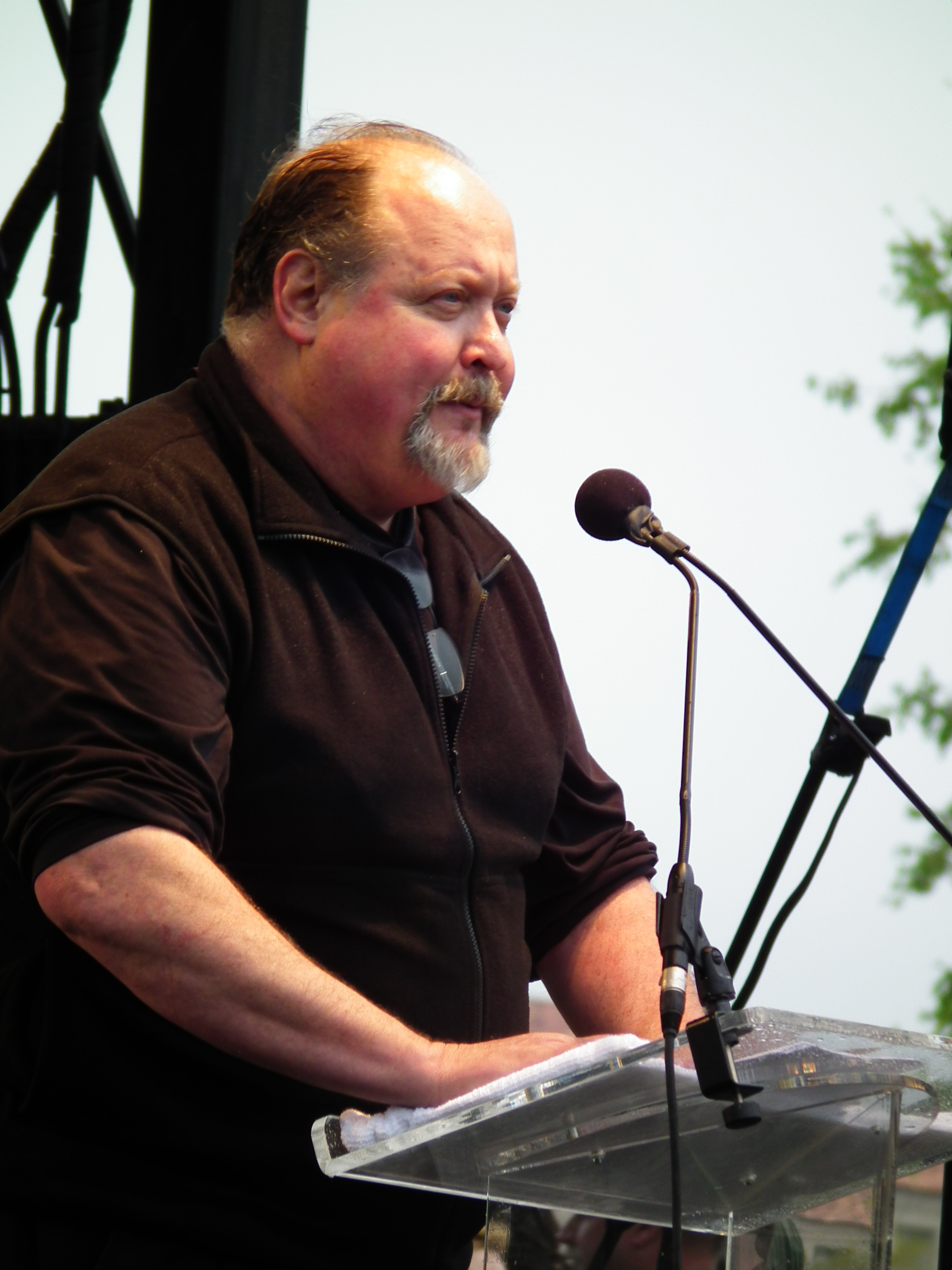
Phelps at the Reason Rally

After leaving WBC, Phelps undertook various jobs before reuniting with his older brother Mark, and in 1978 they established a printing company together in Prairie Village, near Kansas City. The company later relocated to Southern California. Phelps worked for 25 years in the print business.

Three years after leaving, Phelps contacted his family, and for a brief period left Mark and the firm to stay with them. His father had offered to fund him through law school, a path which took 11 of his siblings into careers as lawyers, but which Phelps declined. Fred never accepted him back, eventually denouncing him. Phelps then left again, this time for good, permanently breaking contact with his father.

During an interview while at QEDcon in April 2014, Phelps explained how the lingering effects of his indoctrination as a youth were so entrenched. He understood how one could feel persecuted and sincerely surprised when other people react quite strongly against ideas of what "the truth" was as he saw it:

"When I first heard that my family had started this 'God hates fags' campaign...immediately people start using words like 'cult' and 'hate,' and that kind of stuff. And I remember, more privately than anything else, that, 'No no no no, this isn't a cult, this is my family! This is a church, this is a real church! It's not a cult, and that no, that's not hateful, it's true! So I get it, because that's how you understand the world to be. And even though I had been gone for some time, it was still one of those moments where I got to recognize that I'm actually still holding a lot of these ideas as true in my mind even though I'm starting to question the whole God thing."

In the 20 years following his departure, Phelps tried to find a milder form of Christianity, and raised his own children in an Evangelical church, but his doubts only grew as he continued studying religion. At the Reason Rally in Washington on March 24, 2012, he told that the events of 9/11 finally brought him to disbelief:

"Then, one sunny September morning, the illusion of a personal God that I tried so hard to believe in, exploded over the skies of Manhattan. Even as the ashes and ruin of this horrific act of blind faith settled over New York, Washington D.C., and Pennsylvania, I watched people across the country scrambling to that same irrational altar for their answers. In the fierce storm of emotion that rolled across this country, one realization rose to the surface of my mind with blinding clarity: Certainly this mechanism of unassailable blind faith is one of the greatest risks mankind faces today."

In addition to this, Phelps identifies both his experience reading Michael Shermer's book The Science of Good and Evil and the birth of his first child as turning points in his worldview. Phelps now describes himself as an atheist.

== Career as activist, speaker, and author ==
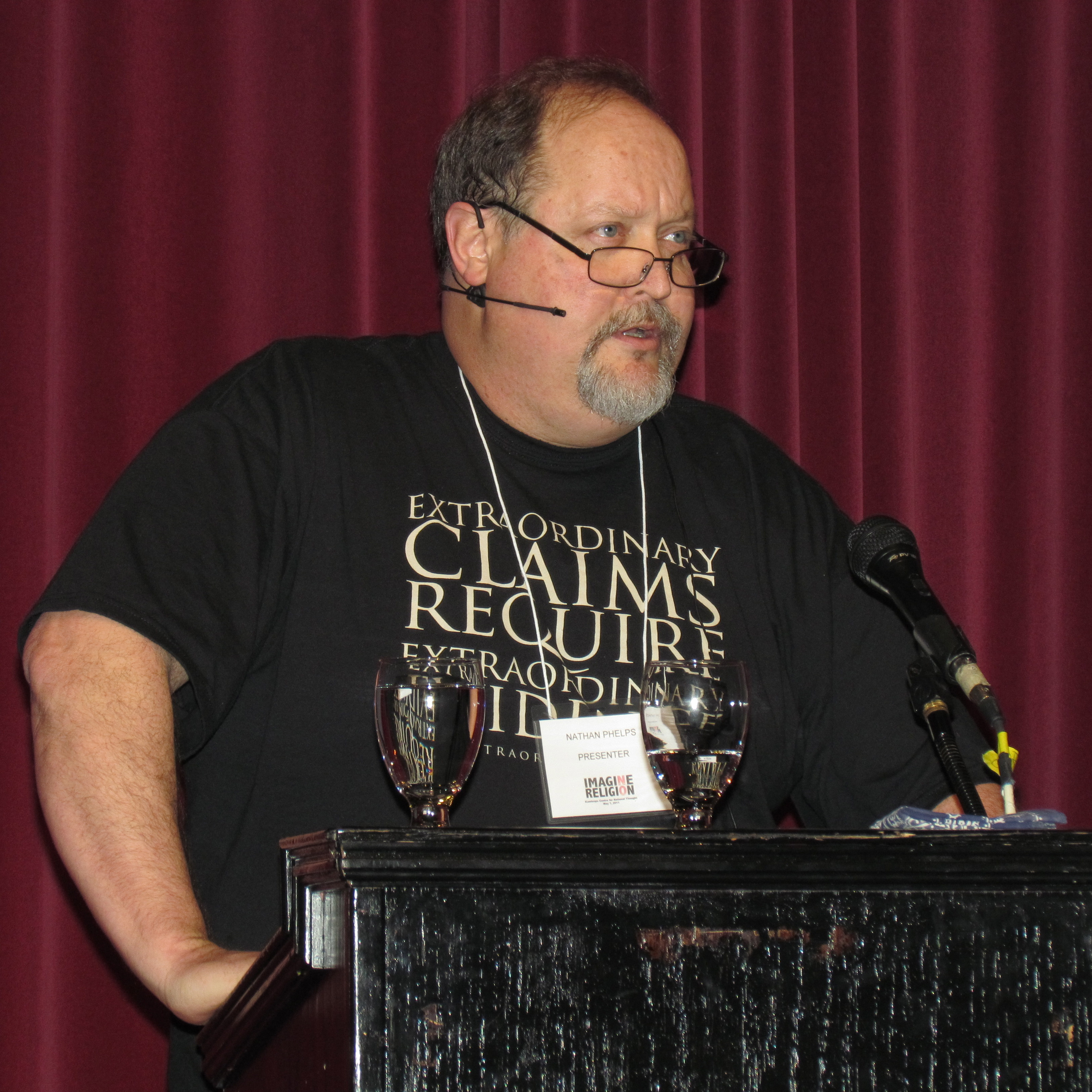
Phelps at The Imagine No Religion conference in Kamloops, British Columbia in 2011

Phelps later moved to rural British Columbia, Canada, and currently lives in Calgary, Alberta. He is the executive director of the Centre for Inquiry Calgary, a secular organization that educates and advocates reason and science. He also serves on the board of directors of Recovering from Religion, which offers education and practical support for people leaving religious communities.

Phelps is an active public speaker and appears at events designed to promote the ideas of atheism, skepticism, and secularism. He has spoken at numerous Gay Pride events and describes himself as an "LGBT activist". He emphasises his work raising awareness of child abuse related to religion and its legal status and has published articles on this topic.

Phelps is known for his criticism of the Westboro Baptist Church through literature, interviews, public speaking at atheist conventions, and his website. He states that his father physically abused him and the other Phelps children, and he believes that the church was an organization for his father to "vent his rage and anger." Nathan has been speaking out against the Westboro Baptist Church as early as 2006.

As of 2014, Phelps was working on a book called Leaving Westboro: Escaping America's Most Hated Church & Family. In the same year, he made a widely reported announcement that his father was terminally ill, and also that Phelps had been "excommunicated" from his own church during 2013. Phelps' father died of natural causes shortly before midnight on March 19, 2014. The Recovering from Religion organization released a statement on behalf of Phelps, who is on their board of directors, about his father's death. He is currently an emeritus board member of Recovering From Religion and executive director for the Center For Inquiry in Calgary.

== See also ==
- Lauren Drain
- The Most Hated Family in America, a 2007 BBC documentary about Westboro Baptist Church presented by Louis Theroux
- Megan Phelps-Roper
