= Respect for America's Fallen Heroes Act =

2006 US federal law prohibiting protests near funerals

The Respect for America's Fallen Heroes Act (Pub. L. 109–228 (text) (PDF), 120 Stat. 387, enacted May 29, 2006) is an Act of Congress that prohibits protests within 300 feet (90 m) of the entrance of any cemetery under control of the National Cemetery Administration (a division of the United States Department of Veterans Affairs) from 60 minutes before to 60 minutes after a funeral. Penalties for violating the act are up to $100,000 in fines and up to one year imprisonment.

== Origins ==
The bill was introduced in large part to combat the campaign by Fred Phelps from the Westboro Baptist Church, of Topeka, Kansas. Phelps and his supporters regularly demonstrated at the funerals of American service members who were killed in the war in Iraq, grounded on the belief that the deaths are divine retribution for social tolerance of homosexuality. This form of protest is protected by the First Amendment.

== Vote ==
The Act was approved by the House via roll call vote with an overwhelming majority of 408 to 3. Ron Paul (R-TX), David Wu (D-OR) and Barney Frank (D-MA) voted against the Act, opposing it on civil liberties and constitutional grounds. Twenty-one members of the House of Representatives did not vote. Barney Frank said of the vote, "I think it's very likely to be found unconstitutional. It's true that when you defend civil liberties you are typically defending people who do obnoxious things... You play into their hand when you let them provoke you into overdoing it. I don't want these thugs to claim America is hypocritical." The Senate passed the bill unanimously. It was promptly signed into law by President George W. Bush on May 29, 2006.

== Opposition and challenges ==
The American Civil Liberties Union (ACLU) opposed the legislation, saying that the Act was unconstitutional and that it would not stand up in court. They said of a similar ban in Kentucky, "The ACLU lawsuit recognizes that Kentucky has an interest in showing respect and compassion for the deceased and for their families, but argues that sections of these laws go too far in prohibiting peaceful protests."

The American Civil Liberties Union prevailed in a 2007 lawsuit challenging a similar state law in Missouri.
