= Snyder v. Phelps =

- Supreme Court of the United States

Argued October 6, 2010 Decided March 2, 2011
- Full case name: Albert Snyder v. Fred W. Phelps Sr.; Westboro Baptist Church, Incorporated; Rebekah A. Phelps-Davis; Shirley L. Phelps-Roper
- Docket no.: 09-751
- Citations: 562 U.S. 443 (more) 131 S. Ct. 1207; 179 L. Ed. 2d 172; 2011 U.S. LEXIS 1903; 79 U.S.L.W. 4135; 39 Media L. Rep. 1353; 22 Fla. L. Weekly Fed. S 836
- Argument: Oral argument
- Opinion announcement: Opinion announcement

Case history
- Prior: Judgment for the plaintiff, 533 F. Supp. 2d 567 (D. Md. 2008); reversed, 580 F.3d 206 (4th Cir. 2009); cert. granted, 559 U.S. 990 (2010).

Questions presented
- Whether Hustler Magazine v. Falwell applies to a private person versus another private person concerning a private matter, and whether a funeral attendee is considered a "captive audience" entitled to state protection from unwanted communication.

Holding
- Speech on a matter of public concern, in a public place, cannot be the basis of liability for a tort of emotional distress.

Court membership
- Chief Justice John Roberts Associate Justices Antonin Scalia · Anthony Kennedy; Clarence Thomas · Ruth Bader Ginsburg; Stephen Breyer · Samuel Alito; Sonia Sotomayor · Elena Kagan

Case opinions
- Majority: Roberts, joined by Scalia, Kennedy, Thomas, Ginsburg, Breyer, Sotomayor, Kagan
- Concurrence: Breyer
- Dissent: Alito

Laws applied
- U.S. Const. amend. I

Snyder v. Phelps, 562 U.S. 443 (2011), is a landmark decision by the Supreme Court of the United States in which the Court held that speech made in a public place on a matter of public concern cannot be the basis of liability for a tort of emotional distress, even if the speech is viewed as offensive or outrageous.

On March 10, 2006, seven members of the Westboro Baptist Church (WBC), led by the church's founder Fred Phelps, picketed the funeral of U.S. Marine Matthew Snyder, who was killed in a non-combat accident during the Iraq War. On public land about 1,000 feet from where the funeral was being held, protesters displayed placards that read "Thank God for Dead Soldiers", "God Hates Fags", and "You're Going to Hell", among others. Snyder's father, Albert Snyder, filed a lawsuit seeking damages from Phelps and the Westboro Baptist Church, claiming that their picketing was meant to intentionally inflict emotional distress. Phelps defended the picketing as an appropriate use of their right to free speech and right to peacefully protest as protected by the First Amendment to the U.S. Constitution.

The United States District Court for the District of Maryland ruled in Snyder's favor and awarded him a total of $10.9 million in damages, but the Fourth Circuit Court of Appeals reversed, holding that the protesters' signs were "rhetorical hyperbole" and "figurative expression" and were therefore protected speech under the First Amendment. On further appeal, the U.S. Supreme Court also ruled in favor of Phelps, holding that speech made in a public place on a matter of public concern cannot be the basis for a claim of tort liability for intentional infliction of emotional distress. In an 8–1 decision delivered by Chief Justice John Roberts, the Court wrote that the First Amendment "shield[s] Westboro from tort liability for its picketing" because the speech was made on a matter of public concern and did not disrupt the funeral. The First Amendment provides special protection to public issues because it serves "the principle that debate on public issues should be uninhibited, robust, and wide-open."

== Background ==
=== Prior case law ===
The First Amendment to the United States Constitution protects the freedom of speech, even if the speech is considered hateful, unless the speech falls in one of several narrow exceptions to First Amendment protection that the Supreme Court has defined over time.

=== Facts of the case ===
The Westboro Baptist Church (WBC), often described as a hate group, (Note: For hate group descriptor, see: "Hate group protests this week". The Temple News. Philadelphia: Temple University. March 30, 2010. Archived from the original on April 6, 2010.; Westcott, Kathryn (May 25, 2006). "Hate group targeted by lawmakers". BBC News.; Williams, Reed; Young, Chris (March 3, 2010). "Opponents rally against Westboro Baptist hate group". Richmond Times-Dispatch.; "Active U.S. Hate Groups (Kansas)". Southern Poverty Law Center.; Lane, Ray (June 14, 2009). "Anti-Gay Hate Group Targets Seattle Churches". Seattle Post-Intelligencer.; Fitzgerald, W.V. (June 16, 2010). "Interview with Westboro Baptist Church: Hate in the Name of God". DigitalJournal.com.) was founded by Fred Phelps in 1955 and is headquartered in Topeka, Kansas. The congregation consists of about "sixty or seventy members", the majority of which are Phelps's children, relatives, and in-laws. Since Westboro's founding, members of the church have picketed hundreds of military funerals "to communicate its belief that God hates the United States for its tolerance of homosexuality, particularly in America's military".

On March 3, 2006, Matthew Snyder, a lance corporal of the United States Marine Corps, was killed in a vehicle accident in the Anbar Province of Iraq during the Iraq War. Shortly after in Snyder's hometown of Westminster, Maryland, his parents Albert and Julie Snyder, then divorced, were separately informed of his death by two Marines. Snyder's death was announced in local newspapers on March 7, and his funeral time and location was announced on March 8. The Westboro Baptist Church issued a press release on March 8 stating that they learned of Snyder's death and that members of the church, including Fred Phelps, planned to travel from Kansas to Maryland in order to picket Snyder's funeral, which was scheduled for March 10 at St. John's Catholic Church in Westminster.

Shortly before Snyder's funeral on March 10, picketers stood on public land about 1,000 feet from the church and displayed placards such as "Thank God for Dead Soldiers", "Thank God for IEDs", "God Hates Fags", "Fag Troops", "America is Doomed", "God Hates the USA/Thank God for 9/11", "Pope in Hell", "Priests Rape Boys", "Don't Pray for the USA", and "You're Going to Hell". The protest lasted about thirty minutes and ended before the funeral began. Following the funeral, Phelps's daughter Shirley Phelps-Roper published statements on the Westboro Baptist Church's website that denounced Albert and Julie Snyder for raising their son Catholic, stating that they "taught Matthew to defy his creator", "raised him for the devil", and "taught him that God was a liar".

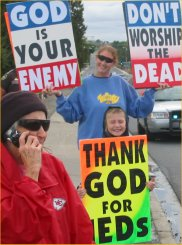
WBC members picketing a military funeral in Yakima, Washington in 2005

=== Lower court proceedings ===
Albert Snyder brought a lawsuit against Fred Phelps and the Westboro Baptist Church in the District Court for the District of Maryland for defamation, intrusion upon seclusion, publicity given to private life, intentional infliction of emotional distress, and civil conspiracy. Snyder's claims of defamation and publicity given to private life were dismissed pursuant to Westboro's request for summary judgment and the case proceeded to trial on the remaining three counts. (Note: Snyder's claim of defamation arose from the statements Phelps-Roper made about him on Westboro's website. It was dismissed on the grounds that the contents were "essentially Phelps-Roper's religious opinion and would not realistically tend to expose the Plaintiff to public hatred or scorn". Snyder's claim of publicity given to private life was similarly dismissed because no private information was made public by Westboro; Phelps-Roper learned that Snyder was divorced and that his son was Catholic from his son's newspaper obituary.) On October 30, 2006, sitting judge Richard D. Bennett denied Phelps's motion to dismiss the case.

The facts of the case were undisputed at trial. Albert Snyder testified:

"[The WBC] turned this funeral into a media circus and they wanted to hurt my family. They wanted their message heard and they didn't care who they stepped over. My son should have been buried with dignity, not with a bunch of clowns outside".

Snyder described becoming tearful, angry, and physically nauseated to the point that he would vomit. He stated that the Defendants had placed a "bug" in his head, so that he was unable to think of his son without thinking of their actions, adding, "I want so badly to remember all the good stuff and so far, I remember the good stuff, but it always turns into the bad". Snyder called several expert witnesses who testified that worsening of his diabetes and severe depression had resulted from the Defendants' activities.

In their defense, WBC established that they had complied with all local ordinances and had obeyed police instructions. The picket was held in a location cordoned off by the police, approximately 1000 feet (300 m) from the church, from which it could be neither seen nor heard. Snyder testified that, although he glimpsed the tops of the signs from the funeral procession, he did not see their content until he watched a news program on television later that day. He also indicated that he had found the WBC's statements about his son on their webpage from a Google search.

In his instructions to the jury, Judge Richard D. Bennett stated that the First Amendment protection of free speech has limits, including vulgar, offensive and shocking statements, and that the jury must decide "whether the defendant's actions would be highly offensive to a reasonable person, whether they were extreme and outrageous and whether these actions were so offensive and shocking as to not be entitled to First Amendment protection". WBC unsuccessfully sought a mistrial based on alleged prejudicial statements made by the judge and violations of the gag order by the plaintiff's attorney. An appeal was also sought by the WBC.

On October 31, 2007, the jury found for the Plaintiff and awarded Snyder $2,900,000 in compensatory damages, later adding a decision to award $6,000,000 in punitive damages for invasion of privacy and an additional $2,000,000 for causing emotional distress (a total of US$10,900,000 (equivalent to $16,924,651 in 2025)). The Phelpses said that despite the verdict, the church would continue to picket military funerals. On February 4, 2008, Bennett upheld the verdict but reduced the punitive damages from $8 million to $2.1 million, to take into consideration the resources of WBC. The total judgment then stood at US$5,000,000 (equivalent to $7,503,490 in 2025). Court liens were ordered on church buildings and Phelps' law office in an attempt to ensure that the damages were paid.

An appeal by WBC was heard on September 24, 2009. The United States Court of Appeals for the Fourth Circuit reversed the jury verdict and set aside the lower court's $5 million judgment. The Fourth Circuit ruled that the lower court had erred by instructing the jury to decide a question of law rather than fact (specifically, whether or not the speech in question was protected by the First Amendment). The Fourth Circuit also ruled that the protest signs and language on WBC's website were rhetorical hyperbole and figurative expression, rather than assertions of fact, so they were a form of protected speech. On March 30, 2010, the Court further ordered Albert Snyder to pay the court costs for the defendants, an amount totaling $16,510. People all over the country, including (notably conservative) political commentator Bill O'Reilly agreed to cover the costs, pending appeal. O'Reilly also pledged to support all of Snyder's future court costs against the Phelps family.

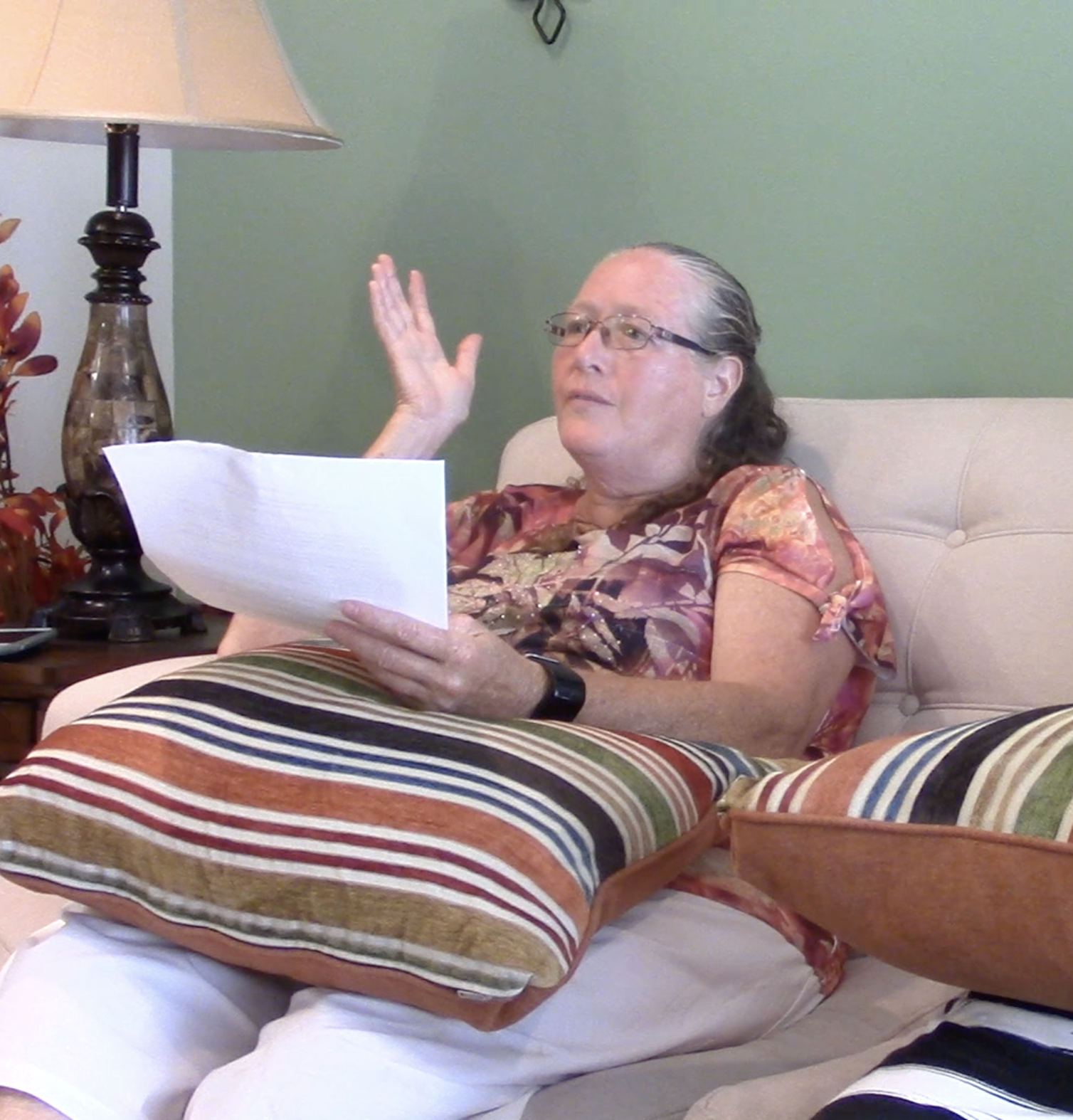
Margie Phelps, who argued the case before the Supreme Court

A writ of certiorari was filed by Snyder to the Supreme Court of the United States, which granted the petition on March 8, 2010.

== Supreme Court ==
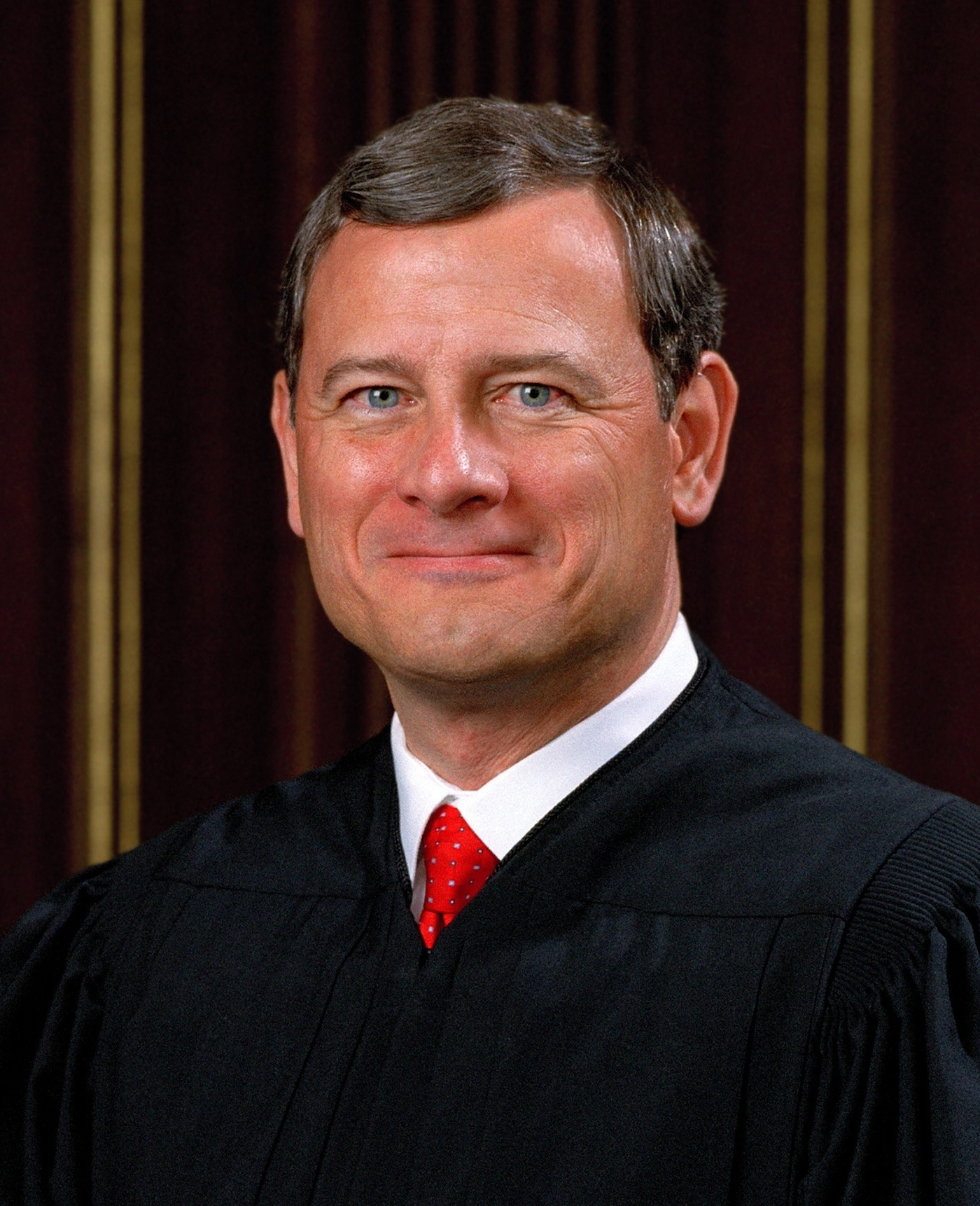
Chief Justice John Roberts, who wrote the majority opinion

Several news and civil rights organizations filed amicus briefs in support of Phelps, including the American Civil Liberties Union, the Reporters Committee for Freedom of the Press, and twenty-one other media organizations, including National Public Radio, Bloomberg L.P., the Associated Press, the Newspaper Association of America, and others.

Other briefs were filed in favor of Snyder, including one by Senate Majority and Minority Leaders Mitch McConnell and Harry Reid, and forty other members of the United States Senate. A number of veterans groups, including the Veterans of Foreign Wars and the American Legion, the John Marshall Veterans Legal Support Center and Clinic, and another by Kansas which was joined by the District of Columbia and every other State except Delaware and Maine.

Arguments were heard on October 6, where the WBC was represented by Phelps' daughter, Margie Phelps.

=== Opinion of the Court ===
In an 8–1 decision the Supreme Court ruled in favor of Phelps, upholding the Fourth Circuit's decision. Chief Justice John Roberts (as in the Stevens case) wrote the majority opinion stating "What Westboro said, in the whole context of how and where it chose to say it, is entitled to 'special protection' under the First Amendment and that protection cannot be overcome by a jury finding that the picketing was outrageous."

The Court's opinion also stated that the memorial service was not disturbed, saying, "Westboro stayed well away from the memorial service, Snyder could see no more than the tops of the picketers' signs, and there is no indication that the picketing interfered with the funeral service itself." The decision also declined to expand the "captive audience doctrine", saying that Snyder was not in a state where he was coerced to hear the negative speech.

Justice Stephen Breyer wrote a concurring opinion, emphasizing his view that the decision related only to picketing, and did not take into consideration Westboro Baptist Church's on-line publications that attacked the Snyder family.

=== Alito's dissent ===
Justice Samuel Alito wrote a dissenting opinion. Alito began his dissent with, "Our profound national commitment to free and open debate is not a license for the vicious verbal assault that occurred in this case." He sternly criticized the Church's conduct, writing:

[Westboro did not] dispute that their speech was "so outrageous in character, and so extreme in degree, as to go beyond all possible bounds of decency, and to be regarded as atrocious, and utterly intolerable in a civilized community." Instead, they maintained that the First Amendment gave them a license to engage in such conduct. They are wrong.

He concluded, "In order to have a society in which public issues can be openly and vigorously debated, it is not necessary to allow the brutalization of innocent victims like petitioner."

In a July 2011 speech, Justice Ginsburg called Alito's dissent "heart-felt" and said that it "underscored the incomparable distress suffered by the Snyder family," noting that "although no member of the Court joined him, his opinion aligned with the views of many Court-watchers, including one of the nation's newest—retired Justice Stevens, [who] recently told the Federal Bar Council he 'would have joined [Justice Alito's] powerful dissent'." Justice John Paul Stevens had retired in 2010.

== See also ==
- Fighting words
- First Amendment to the United States Constitution
- Fred Phelps
- Freedom of speech
- Gertz v. Robert Welch, Inc.
- Hustler Magazine v. Falwell
- Intentional infliction of emotional distress
- List of United States Supreme Court cases, volume 562
- New York Times Co. v. Sullivan
- Rowan v. U.S. Post Office Dept.
