= Shirley Phelps-Roper =

American lawyer and political activist

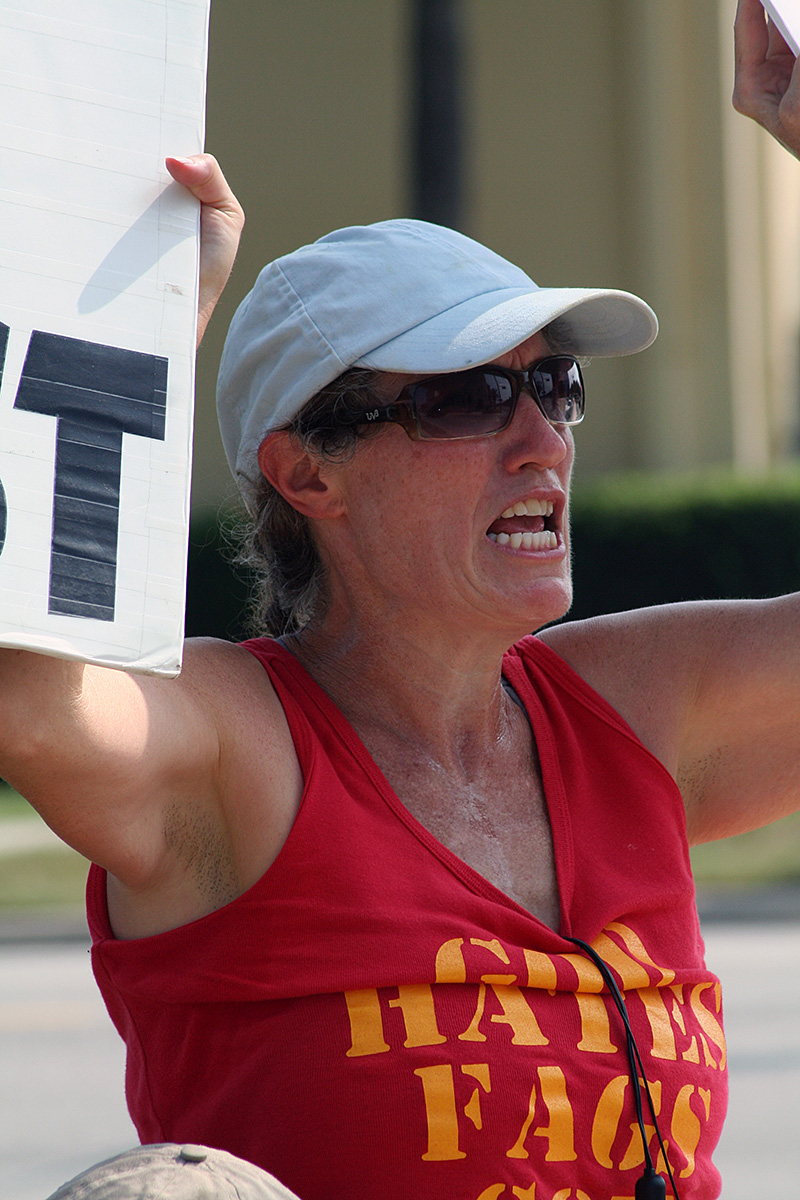
- Phelps-Roper in 2007
- Born: Shirley Lynn Phelps; October 31, 1957 (age 69); Topeka, Kansas, U.S.
- Education: Washburn University (BA, JD)
- Spouse: Brent Roper
- Children: 11, including Megan
- Parent(s): Fred Phelps; Margie Marie Simms
- Relatives: Nathan Phelps (brother)

Shirley Lynn Phelps-Roper (née Phelps; born October 31, 1957) is an American lawyer and political activist. She was the lead spokesperson of the Westboro Baptist Church of Topeka, Kansas, an organization that protests against homosexuality conducted under the slogan "God Hates Fags", until a power struggle within the organization reduced her status.

== Early life and education ==
Shirley Phelps was born October 31, 1957, in Topeka, Kansas. She is the daughter of Margie Marie (Simms) and pastor Fred Phelps, minister of the Westboro Baptist Church, an independent church characterized as a hate group by the Anti-Defamation League and the Southern Poverty Law Center. She obtained a Bachelor of Arts in criminal justice in 1979 and a Juris Doctor degree in 1981 from Washburn University in Topeka.

== Career ==
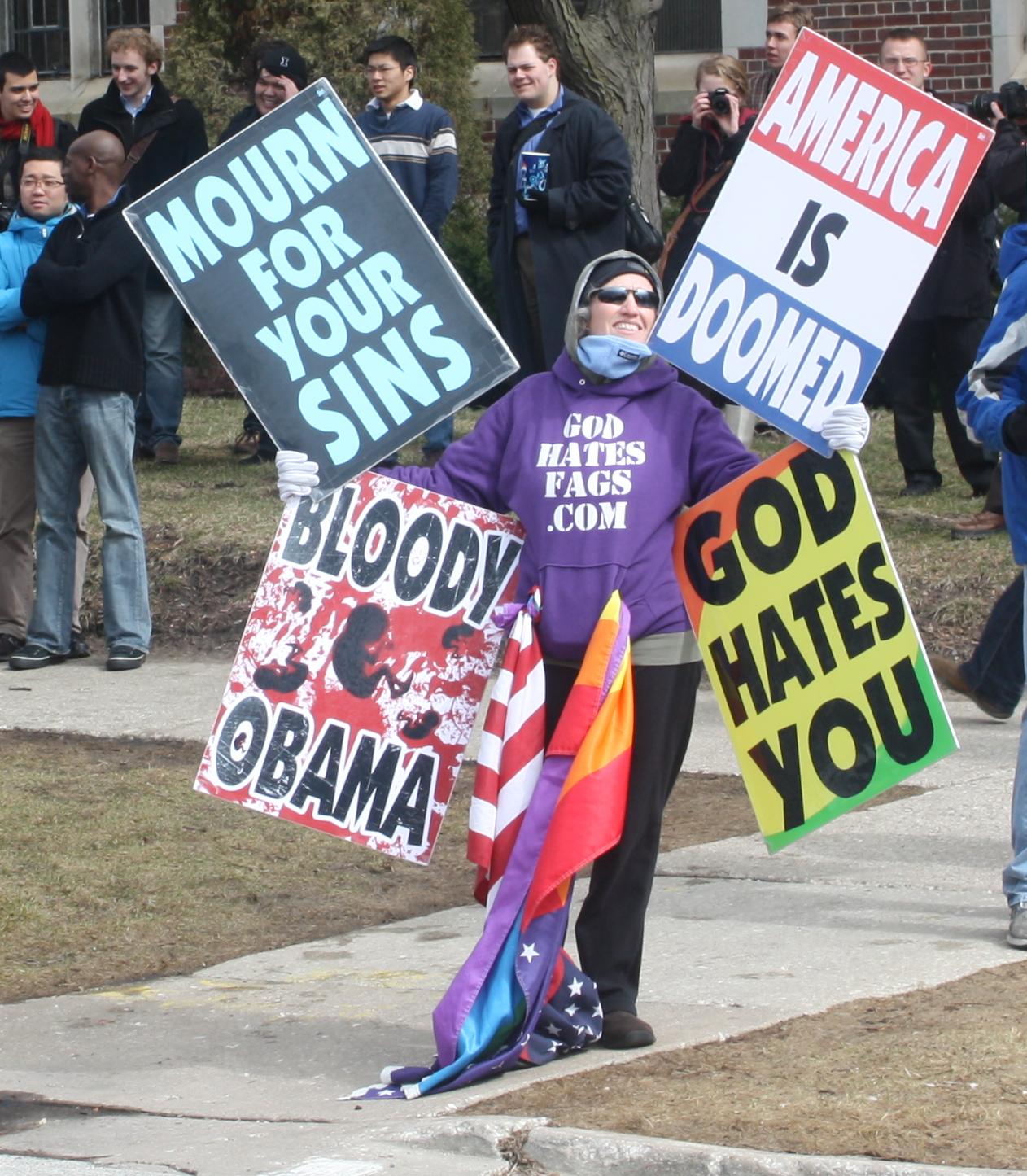
Phelps-Roper protesting in Chicago in 2009

Phelps-Roper practices law for Phelps-Chartered Co., the Phelps family's law firm established by her father in 1964. According to her firm's web page, she has been licensed to practice in Kansas and federal courts.

Besides her father Fred, Shirley Phelps-Roper was the most active spokesperson of the Westboro Baptist Church and answered many of the e-mails sent to the church in a column called "Dear Shirley". She and other family members have become known for picketing at funerals of AIDS victims with signs such as "God hates fags" and at funeral processions for American soldiers killed in combat.

In 2006, in the aftermath of the West Nickel Mines School shooting, Phelps-Roper was invited to Hannity & Colmes on Fox News. During the interview, Alan Colmes questioned Phelps-Roper as to whether the five Amish girls deserved to die, to which she responded that they did, prompting condemnation by Colmes and co-host Sean Hannity who called her sick and evil. In February 2008, Phelps-Roper traveled to the community of DeKalb, Illinois, to picket memorials for the victims of the Northern Illinois University shooting. Phelps-Roper said that "God [had] sent the shooter" because they "don't love Christ". Her plans, however, to picket other university memorials were blocked.

By 2014, Phelps-Roper's duties as spokesperson for the Westboro Church had been reduced after a power struggle within the church, and her authority transferred to an all-male board of elders.

=== Legal issues ===
Phelps-Roper was arrested on June 5, 2007, on suspicion of contributing to the delinquency of a minor. Police alleged that she allowed her son to trample an American flag while protesting the funeral of a soldier in Bellevue, Nebraska, which is a misdemeanor in the state. Phelps-Roper announced her intent to challenge the constitutionality of the Nebraska statute. The charges against her were dropped when she agreed to dismiss pending lawsuits filed against Sarpy County in state and federal court.

Phelps-Roper was named a defendant in the Supreme Court case Snyder v. Phelps. She has been placed on the list of individuals banned from entering the United Kingdom for "fostering extremism or hatred".

== Personal life ==
Phelps-Roper is married to Brent D. Roper and they have 11 children. Five of her children, notably Megan Phelps-Roper, have left the church.

In a 2007 Channel 4 documentary featuring Welsh personality Keith Allen, Phelps-Roper said on camera that her oldest son, Samuel, was born out of wedlock. When asked if she would go to hell for her actions, Phelps-Roper explained that "I know better" and had "put away" such behavior.

== Family tree ==
Fred Phelps family tree

Catherine Idalette	Fred Wade Phelps
Fred Waldron Phelps	Margie Marie Simms
Rachel Phelps Hockenbarger	Shirley Phelps-Roper	Jonathan Baxter Phelps	Timothy Bryan Phelps	Rebekah Phelps Davis	Fred Waldron Phelps Jr.	Abigail Phelps	Margie Jean Phelps	Elizabeth Marie Phelps	Nate Phelps	Katherine Phelps	Mark Phelps	Dorotha Phelps
Samuel Phelps-Roper	Isaiah Phelps-Roper	Rebekah Phelps-Roper	Zacharia Phelps-Roper	Joshua Phelps-Roper	Megan Phelps-Roper	Libby Phelps
