= Protests by Westboro Baptist Church =

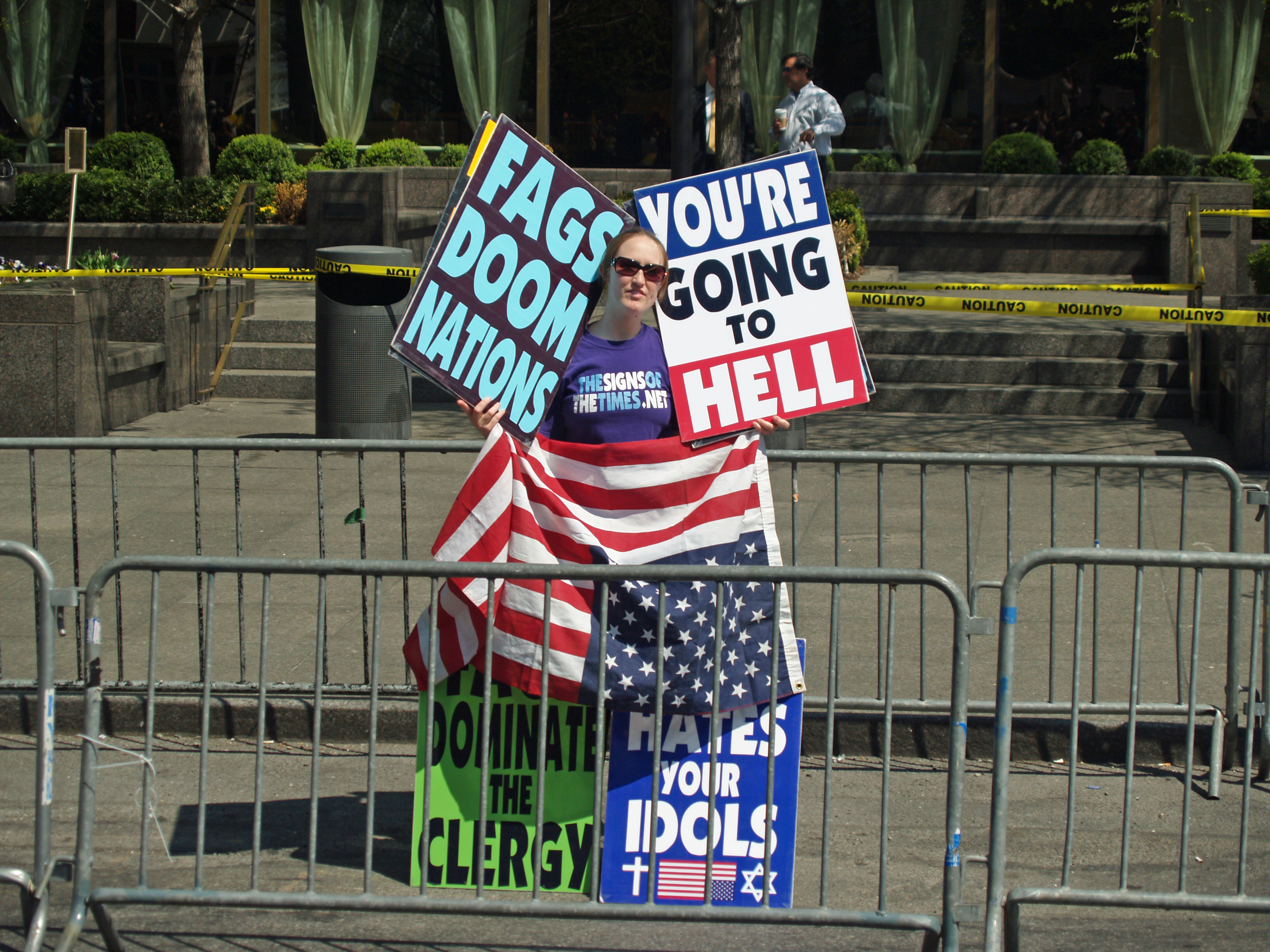
WBC member protesting Pope Benedict XVI outside the United Nations in New York City, 2008

The Westboro Baptist Church carries out daily picketing in Topeka, Kansas, and travels nationally to picket the funerals of gay victims of crimes or anti-gay attacks, as well as those of people who have died from complications related to AIDS. It also pickets other events related or peripherally related to homosexuality. It is the protesting of military funerals that led to the organization receiving much attention for its small size. Protests done by Westboro Baptist Church are characterized by desecration of the American flag, hate speech said by members to onlookers, and members holding signs with predominantly homophobic and anti-American statements.

The group has protested a number of high-profile events such as the funerals of victims of the Sandy Hook Elementary School shooting and the West Nickel Mines School shooting. As well as protesting these high-profile events, WBC protests many local low-profile events, such as Kansas City Chiefs football games and live pop concerts. While the messages are widely condemned, the organization always ensures its protests are legal in nature through keeping the protests non-violent and acquiring the proper permits.

== Protest activities ==
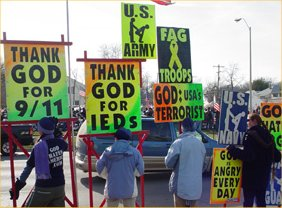
Picketing in Topeka, with the group's signature multi-colored picket signs.

=== Early WBC protests ===
The group came into the national spotlight in 1998, when it was featured on CNN for picketing the funeral of Matthew Shepard, a young man from Laramie, Wyoming, who was beaten to death by two men allegedly because of his homosexuality. WBC later picketed productions of The Laramie Project, a play based on Shepard's murder. Since then, WBC has attracted attention for many more actual and planned funeral pickets.

=== 2000s ===
On January 25, 2004, Phelps picketed five churches (three Catholic and two Episcopalian) and the Federal Courthouse for what he said was their part in legitimizing same-sex marriages in Iowa. A community response was to hold counter-protests and a multifaith service in the municipal auditorium. On January 15, 2006, Westboro members protested a memorial for Sago Mine disaster victims, claiming that the mining accident was God's revenge against the U.S. for its tolerance of homosexuality.

In July 2005, WBC declared its intention to picket the memorial service of Carrie French in Boise, Idaho. French, 19, was killed on June 5 in Kirkuk, Iraq, where she served as an ammunition specialist with the 116th Brigade Combat Team's 145th Support Battalion. Phelps Sr. said, "Our attitude toward what's happening with the war is the Lord is punishing this evil nation for abandoning all moral imperatives that are worth a dime."

In 2006, Westboro picketed with banners saying "God hates fags" and "Thank God for dead soldiers" at the Westminster, Maryland, funeral of Matthew Snyder, a U.S. Marine who was also killed in Iraq. Ruling on a subsequent lawsuit filed by Snyder's father, Albert Snyder, the U.S. Supreme Court decided, 8–1 in Snyder v. Phelps, that Westboro's actions constituted protected free speech.

On January 26, 2008, WBC traveled to Jacksonville, North Carolina, home of Camp Lejeune, to protest the United States Marine Corps in the wake of the murder of Maria Lauterbach. Five women protested, stomping on the American flag and shouting slogans such as "1,2,3,4, God Hates the Marine Corps".

On February 2, 2008, WBC picketed during the funeral of Mormon spiritual leader Gordon B. Hinckley, a former president of the Church of Jesus Christ of Latter-day Saints, in Salt Lake City, Utah. The group displayed picket signs accusing him of being a "lying false prophet" and "leading millions of people astray". The organization also criticized him for being too accepting of gay people, accusing him of having an ambiguous voice about homosexuality rather than taking a firm stand against it. Police had difficulty determining whether the demonstration met the guidelines of protected free speech.

On May 14, 2008, two days after the 2008 Sichuan earthquake which claimed the lives of at least 70,000 people, WBC issued a press release thanking God for the heavy loss of life in China, and praying "for many more earthquakes to kill many more thousands of impudent and ungrateful Chinese".

Most anti-abortion activists avoided the funeral of OB/GYN Dr. George Tiller, assassinated on May 31, 2009. Held at the Wichita College Hill United Methodist Church, it was attended by 900 mourners. However, 17 members from Westboro picketed, kept at a 500-foot (150 m) distance by police. WBC protesters held signs that read "God sent the shooter", "Abortion is bloody murder", and "Baby Killer in Hell".

On May 8, 2009, members of WBC protested at three Jewish sites in Washington, D.C., including the Anti-Defamation League (ADL) offices, the U.S. Holocaust Memorial Museum and the city's largest synagogue. Margie Phelps, daughter of Pastor Fred Phelps, led the protest, holding signs stating that "God Hates Israel", "Jews Killed Jesus", "America Is Doomed", "Israel Is Doomed", and "ADL Jew Bullies". The protest was apparently part of a series of upcoming protests which WBC has planned at Jewish institutions in Omaha, St. Louis, South Florida and Providence. The group reportedly posted a list of the upcoming protests' locations and dates, along with the statement "Jews Killed the Lord Jesus."

Westboro picketed the funeral of the singer Michael Jackson after his death on June 25, 2009. Members of Westboro have also recorded a song titled "God Hates the World", an adaptation of Jackson's charity single "We Are the World".

=== 2010s ===
In May 2010, Westboro picketed the funeral of heavy metal vocalist Ronnie James Dio in Los Angeles, saying it believed the singer worshipped Satan. Dio's widow urged attendees to ignore the protest, saying "Ronnie hates prejudice and violence. We need to turn the other cheek on these people that only know how to hate someone they didn't know. We only know how to love someone we know."

In January 2011, WBC announced they would picket the funeral of Christina Green, a 9-year-old victim of the 2011 Tucson shooting in which Representative Gabrielle Giffords was also (non-fatally) shot. In response, the Arizona legislature passed an emergency bill to ban protests within 300 feet (100 m) of a funeral service, and Tucson residents made plans to shield the funeral from protesters. The group canceled plans to hold a protest during the memorial at the University of Arizona in exchange for air time on radio talk shows. According to university officials, between 700 and 1,200 students amassed to counter four WBC picketers who appeared at the campus after the event. Jael Phelps explained to Louis Theroux in her interview for America's Most Hated Family in Crisis that she and the other members of WBC picketed at the funeral of a Muslim man's wife simply because the man had witnessed and scolded them for intentionally burning a copy of the Quran in public a week earlier.

On May 29, 2011, WBC intended to protest in Joplin, Missouri, at the memorial service for the victims of the May 22, 2011, tornado that leveled large portions of the town. Those intending to protest the memorial service or President Obama's speech given there, or both, were refused entry into the venue by hundreds of local and regional residents, including a large group of bikers from the Patriot Guard Riders.

On October 5, 2011, Fred Phelps' daughter, Margie, announced via her Twitter account that WBC would be picketing Apple Inc. founder Steve Jobs' funeral. CBS News and The Washington Post noted the irony in the fact Margie used an iPhone to create the tweet.

WBC announced on December 16, 2012, its intent to picket at the funerals of the victims of the Sandy Hook Elementary School shootings. The online hacktivist group Anonymous and several other groups responded by organizing a human wall to shield the victims' families. WBC then left the area without engaging in any protests.

On April 15, 2013, WBC posted a press release to its Twitter account in which it thanked God for that day's Boston Marathon bombing, and announced its plan to "picket the funeral of those killed". Pointing out the federal government is classifying the bombing as a terrorist attack, yet is being unclear about whether it is of a "domestic or foreign nature", the release went on to claim to answer the question with, "Here's a hint — GOD SENT THE BOMBS! How many more terrifying ways will you have the LORD injure and kill your fellow countrymen because you insist on nation-dooming filthy fag marriage?!" By early the next morning, nearly 4,000 people had signed a We the People petition on the White House website asking for the banning of such demonstrations by the group at victims' funerals. Additionally, a posting that same day on a Twitter account affiliated with the hacktivist group Anonymous hinted that WBC leaders would be targeted if they made good on their threat to picket the funerals.

On May 20, 2013, WBC tweeted praising God for the 2013 Moore tornado and that they would protest the funerals of the victims.

On May 30, 2011, WBC was present at Arlington National Cemetery's Memorial Day services as part of their "Thank God for Dead Soldiers" campaign. A counter protest included members of the Ku Klux Klan.

Westboro announced its intent to picket the funeral of Nelson Mandela, the pivotal figure of the anti-apartheid movement, claiming he was going to hell for committing adultery by remarrying after his divorce.

Following the approval of gay marriage by popular national vote in Ireland on May 22, 2015, the Westboro Baptist Church said that Ireland was led by "dogs" and had become a "cesspool of corruption". They staged a public protest using printed posters showing the flag of Côte d'Ivoire in error, thinking it was the Irish flag. Then they threw an actual Irish flag on the ground and stamped on it.

WBC celebrated the 2016 shooting at an Orlando gay nightclub that left 49 people dead and 53 others injured. On June 18, 2016, members picketed after the attack, but around 200 people blocked view of the picketing.

In 2018, WBC protested the John Burroughs School, a high school in Missouri, due to their football captain Jake Bain coming out as gay. They were met with hundreds of counterprotesters.

== No-shows ==
WBC has occasionally issued press releases threatening to picket sensitive events such as funerals and memorials without following through. Examples include the funerals of Heath Ledger, Natasha Richardson, Elizabeth Taylor, Ryan Dunn, Joe Paterno, Roy Tisdale, Yeardley Love, Charlie and Braden Powell, Gloria Leonidas, Steve Jobs, George Jones, Lou Reed, Pete Seeger, Maya Angelou, Hailey Owens, Robert H. Schuller, Adam Ward, Slayer guitarist Jeff Hanneman, Roger Ebert, Cory Monteith, Paul Walker, Philip Seymour Hoffman, Robin Williams, and victims of the I-35W Mississippi River bridge collapse.

In February 2012, WBC stated they would protest the funeral of Whitney Houston. After seemingly failing to do so, Margie Phelps later claimed over Twitter to have protested Houston's funeral and uploaded an image showing WBC protestors there. However, Star-Ledger reporters later stated that no WBC protestors had been present, leading to allegations of photo manipulation.

Members of the group intended to picket the March 2015 funeral of actor Leonard Nimoy but were unable to find the location.

On two occasions, WBC accepted offers for radio air time in exchange for canceling an announced protest.

== Counter protests ==
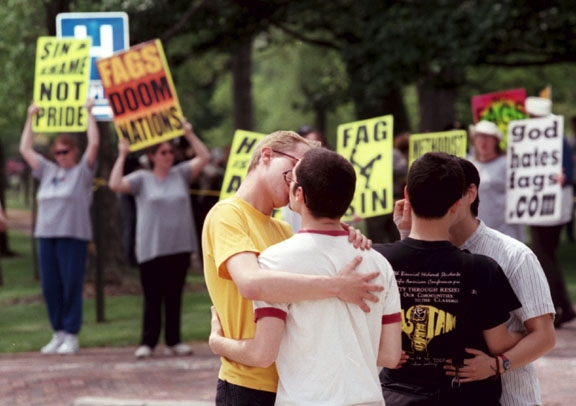
Students kissing in front of protesters from Westboro Baptist Church at Oberlin College in Oberlin, Ohio. The students were among several hundred who turned out in May 2000 to rally against Westboro protesters.

Counter protests are often organized to be held at sites that Westboro Baptist pickets and, in some cases, counter protesters have lined up and turned their backs on the Westboro Baptist pickets. The Patriot Guard Riders is a motorcyclist group composed mostly of veterans who attend the funerals of members of the U.S. Armed Forces at the invitation of the deceased's family. The group was initially formed to shelter and protect the funerals from protesters from WBC.

=== 1990s ===
In 1999, inspired by the murder of Matthew Shepard the previous year, Michael Moore organized a protest against homophobia for his television show The Awful Truth. He toured states with anti-sodomy laws in the "Sodomobile," a pink bus filled with gay men and women. At one point, they visited WBC compound and got out to meet Fred Phelps, at which time Moore introduced the Sodomobile to him.

=== 2000s ===
Two days after the September 11 attacks in 2001, a 19-year-old man named Jared Dailey stood on the street corner facing WBC holding up a plywood sign that said "Not today, Fred." Within two days, 86 people joined him, waving American flags and anti-hate signs.

During a picket in Seaford, Delaware, on May 21, 2006, one person broke through police lines and assaulted WBC members who fled into a police van. Five people faced criminal charges.

Early in the morning of August 2, 2008, someone set fire to a garage near WBC's headquarters causing an estimated $10,000 in damages.

On December 12, 2008, the group picketed a production of The Laramie Project at the Boston Center for the Arts. Local activists held a Phelps-A-Thon in response. Supporters pledged online to donate for every minute WBC protested. The event raised over $4,600 for an LGBT-rights project, Driving Equality.

=== 2010s ===
In March 2010, a Richmond, Virginia, ad hoc group formed to create a counter protest to a planned WBC visit protesting against Jewish and LGBT organizations. Pennies In Protest took pledges for each minute of WBC protest. The funds (approx. $14,000) were then donated to those same Jewish and LGBT organizations that WBC was protesting.

On November 30, 2010, disabled Army veteran Ryan Newell was arrested in his parked SUV outside the Wichita, Kansas, city hall while members of WBC were in a meeting inside. Guns and ammunition were found in the back of the SUV, and Newell was charged with weapons violations and felony conspiracy to commit aggravated battery. On June 23, 2011, Newell pleaded guilty to impersonating a law enforcement officer and was sentenced to two years of probation. Newell received public support for his actions, and fundraisers and websites were created by the public to help in his defense.

On December 11, 2010, the day of the funeral of Elizabeth Edwards, a group called Line of Love planned to have about 200 protesters on the north side of West Edenton Street in Raleigh, North Carolina, while 10 Westboro members picketed on the south side of the street, two blocks away from the funeral. Westboro members who disagreed with Edwards' tolerance for gays were "promoting awareness of the dangers of homosexuality", Line of Love gave its goal as "promoting proper respect for funerals".

On February 24, 2011, hacktivists successfully took WBC's websites down. WBC claims this was the work of Anonymous, but the group denied responsibility, instead identifying The Jester as the culprit. During a live TV confrontation on The David Pakman Show between Shirley Phelps-Roper and Topiary of LulzSec, Phelps-Roper stated that Anonymous could not "stop God's message". In response, Topiary and an accomplice seized control of one of Westboro's subdomains during the confrontation.

On September 16, 2011, when Westboro members picketed a Foo Fighters concert in Kansas City, Missouri, the band appeared on a truck float in front of the protesters. Dressed in homoerotic outfits, they performed their country-parody song "Keep It Clean" – which contained many homosexual references and overtones – from their "Hot Buns" viral video; midway though the song, lead singer Dave Grohl made a speech calling for equality and tolerance. The band uploaded a video of the impromptu performance the next day on their YouTube channel.

After Westboro announced plans to picket funerals of victims of the Sandy Hook Elementary shooting on December 14, 2012, hacktivists from Anonymous executed a distributed denial of service attack (DDOS) on Westboro's website, GodHatesFags.com, stating: "We will continuously DDOS until they are forced to put their inbred church tithes to use to pay for bandwidth." Anonymous also simultaneously released a Westboro membership list, with the personal contact information for most Westboro members.

In 2012, Aaron Jackson, co-founder of the charity Planting Peace, purposely purchased a home across the street from WBC with intentions of supporting LGBT youth. In March 2013, the house was nicknamed the "Equality House" as it was painted the colors of the rainbow flag.

On July 14, 2013, members of The Satanic Temple performed a "pink mass" ritual over the grave of Fred Phelps's mother. The group said that the "mass" would posthumously turn the dead woman into a lesbian.

A satirical Facebook page about God raised $80,000 from fans to post a billboard in Topeka that says "God Loves Gays", which debuted on September 8, 2014.

On June 18, 2016, around 200 people blocked the view of picketing by members of WBC that occurred after the Orlando nightclub shooting.

In July 2016, WBC was a "gym" in Pokémon Go led by a pink Clefairy put in by players named "Love is Love". Members of the organization responded by branding the Pokémon a sodomite.

In December 2019, WBC protested German singer Kim Petras' concert in Kansas, making deragotary comments about her transgender identity. Petras responded to the protest by posting a mocking video on her social media and later posed in front of the protesters and took several pictures. Her actions were praised by many fellow pop stars, including Katy Perry, Charli XCX, Slayyyter, Grimes and others.
