= Phelps-A-Thon =

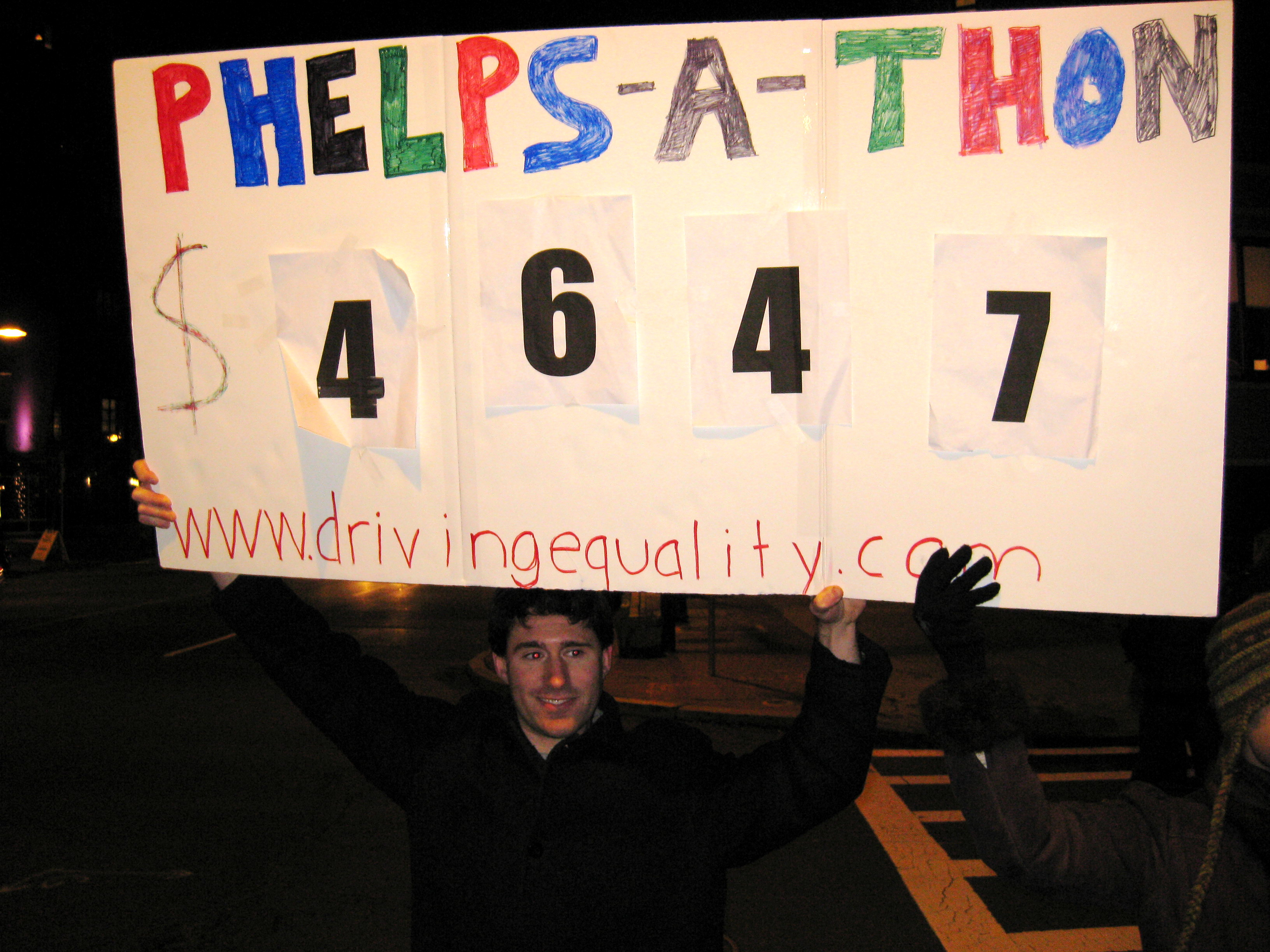
Chris Mason leads a Phelps-A-Thon counter-protest against the Westboro Baptist Church

Phelps-A-Thon.com is a Boston-based, pro-LGBT website working to counteract the message spread by the Westboro Baptist Church, (WBC) and their leader Fred Phelps.

== History ==
Phelps-A-Thon.com is run by LGBTQ+ activist Chris Mason, established when Fred Phelps from the Westboro Baptist Church came to Boston to protest a local production of The Laramie Project. The event raised over $4,600 for the pro-LGBT project, Driving Equality. After this first Phelps-A-Thon, people from around the country, upon learning they were going to be picketed by WBC, started contacting Chris, asking for help in setting up their own Phelps-A-Thons. The Phelps-A-Thon.com website was created in an effort to help local activists conduct the counter-protests in their own communities.

During a trek across the country to promote LGBT equality, Chris Mason, founder of Phelps-A-Thon.com stopped in Topeka, Kansas to visit the Westboro Baptist Church in October 2010. Concealing his activist identity, he sat down for a conversation with Shirley Phelps-Roper, the daughter of Fred Phelps, to get a better understanding of the group's mission. In a video clip of the interview, Chris asks Shirley her opinion of the Phelps-A-Thon counter-protests.

== Work ==
Phelps-A-Thon.com assists groups that are being picketed by WBC in setting up a Telethon type of counter-protest. Through the "Phelps-A-Thon.com" website, supporters can pledge online to donate a certain amount of money for every minute of WBC pickets against a specific target, usually LGBT or Jewish groups. The longer they protest, the more money they raise for the cause that they are demonstrating against.
