= Aaron Jackson (activist) =

American activist

- Born: Destin, Florida
- Occupation: Founder of Planting Peace
- Known for: Equality House
- Parent(s): Wendy Grant, James Jackson

Aaron Jackson is an American human rights and environmental activist. Jackson was raised in Destin, Florida and attended Valencia College until 2002. After backpacking around the world, he interned at The Homeless Voice, an advocacy group in Davie, Florida, and became director of the COSAC Homeless Shelter. The first orphanages he opened in Haiti were established using money he made as a golf caddy while living in a homeless shelter in order to fund the orphanages. Jackson was named a CNN Hero in 2007 after leading a campaign to deworm children in Haiti.

In 2004, Jackson founded Planting Peace, a nonprofit organization that advocates for LGBT issues and runs six orphanages in Haiti and India. In 2012, he purchased a home across from Westboro Baptist Church after looking at the neighborhood around Westboro on Google Earth. He painted the exterior of the house with the colors of the pride flag in 2013 and it became the "Equality House." Through Planting Peace, Jackson placed a billboard in Kim Davis' hometown after she denied marriage licenses to same sex couples in 2015. In 2016, Jackson traveled to Antarctica to place a pride flag deeming it "the world's first LGBT-friendly continent."
