= Planting Peace =

Nonprofit, humanitarian organization based in Kansas, US

- Founded: 2004
- Founders: Aaron Jackson
- Type: nonprofit peace organisation
- Purpose: peace, humanitarian aid, environmental initiatives
- Location: Topeka, Kansas
- Region served: Worldwide
- Website: www.plantingpeace.org

Planting Peace is a nonprofit humanitarian organization founded for the purpose of "spreading peace in a hurting world". The organization specializes in diverse global causes, including orphanages in Haiti and India, international deworming efforts, rainforest preservation, and anti-bullying programs. In 2007 Planting Peace founder Aaron Jackson was honored as a CNN Hero for his relief efforts deworming millions of children in Haiti. In March 2013 Planting Peace gained international attention when they created the Equality House, a rainbow-colored home located directly across the street from Westboro Baptist Church, an anti-LGBT group. In 2016, members of Planting Peace walked across Antarctica with a Pride flag in "a symbolic effort to declare full human rights for all lesbian, gay, bisexual and transgender (LGBT) people living in or visiting Antarctica."

== History ==
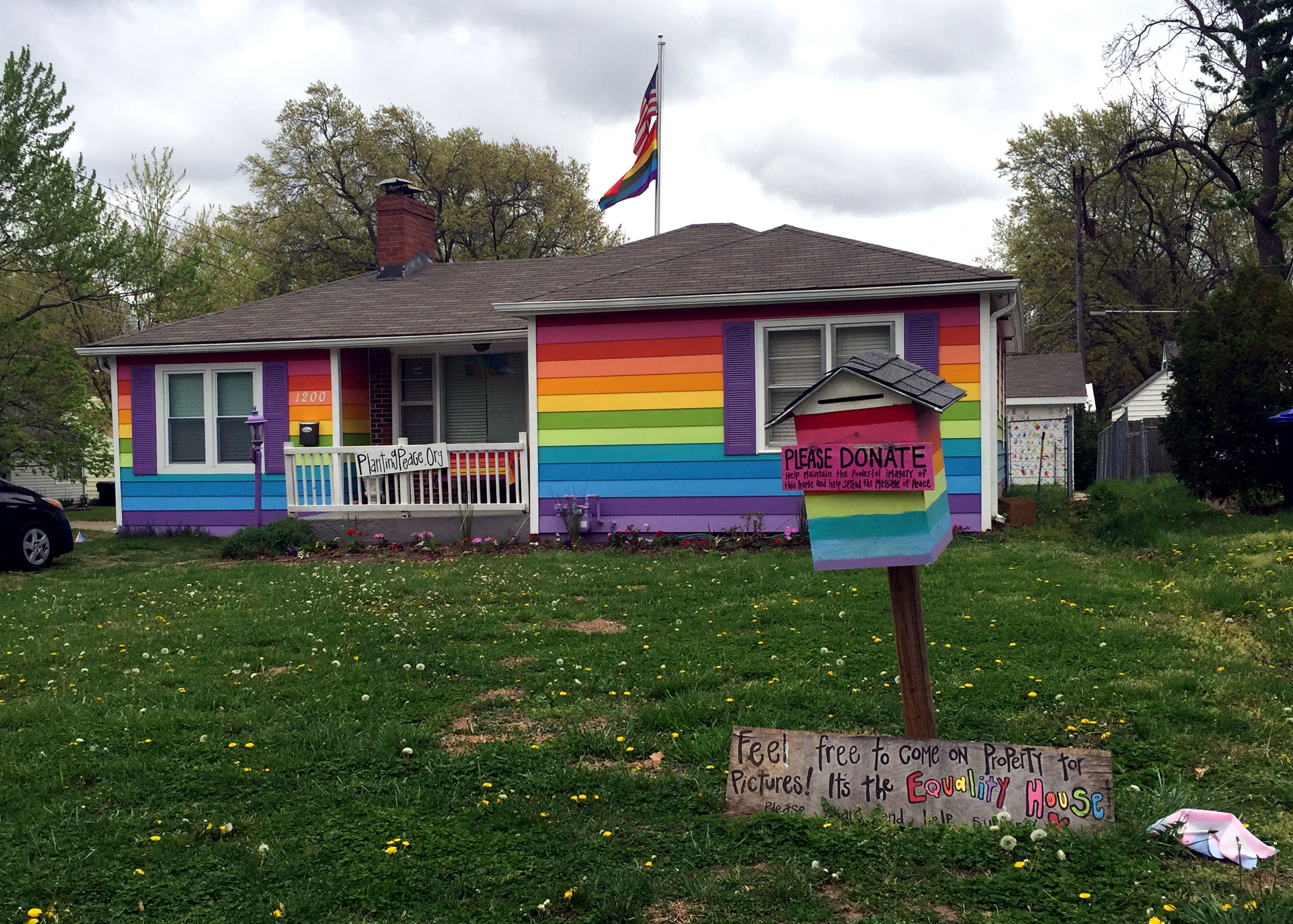
Equality House

Planting Peace was founded in 2004 by American Aaron Jackson and Haitian John Louis Dieubon. While on a relief trip to Haiti, Jackson saw the poor living conditions of many of the country's children, and decided to open an orphanage for street children in Haiti. In 2004, they opened a home for seven children in Port-au-Prince. As of 2013, Planting Peace is operating four orphanages in Haiti and two in India.

In 2005 Jackson began an effort to provide de-worming medicine to children in Haiti. As of 2013, Planting Peace has provided de-worming medicine to over 13 million children worldwide, including the Dominican Republic, Republic of the Sudan, North Korea, and Haiti.

In 2009, Planting Peace purchased 624 acres (253 ha) of rain forest land in Peru. The group has also planted over one million moringa tree seeds in Haiti as part of reforestation efforts.

In 2012, Planting Peace purchased a home across the street from Westboro Baptist Church, an anti-LGBT hate group in Topeka, Kansas. The Westboro Baptist Church is known for extreme ideologies, especially those against gay people. It was headed by Fred Phelps and consists primarily of members of his family; in 2011, the church stated that it had about 40 members. The church is headquartered in a residential neighborhood on the west side of Topeka about three miles (5 km) west of the Kansas State Capitol. In March 2013 Planting Peace painted the house with the colors of the rainbow flag in tribute to the gay pride flag, and dubbed the Equality House, to "serve as the resource center for all Planting Peace anti-bullying initiatives and will stand as a visual reminder of our commitment, as global citizens, to equality for all". The house soon received international media attention from outlets such as Time magazine, The Washington Post, and Good Morning America, among others. Proceeds raised from the house go toward launching a national anti-bullying program, and The Equality House itself serves as a drop-in center and home for volunteers. In June 2013, a lesbian couple was married in front of the Equality House. The Westboro Baptist Church protested with signs, but the wedding progressed anyway.

In April 2016, Planting Peace put up a billboard in Mississippi to protest a new state law which allowed individuals to deny service to LGBT members for religious reasons. The billboard depicted Jesus saying, "Guys, I said I hate figs and to love thy neighbor."

In June, Planting Peace acquired the house next to the Equality House and painted it the colors of the transgender flag. This was done to further their support of the queer community.

In July, the peace organization sponsored a billboard of presidential candidates Donald Trump and Ted Cruz poised to kiss. It was displayed in Cleveland, Ohio, leading up to the 2016 Republican National Convention.

On August 17, 2016, Planting Peace sent the first pride flag into space using a high-altitude balloon. They did so to declare space LGBTQ friendly. "The primary purpose of this declaration is to support the ongoing fight for the fundamental human rights of our LGBTQ family, moving us closer to a universal understanding that all people deserve to live freely and love freely without fear and discrimination," the Planting Peace website states.
