= Equality House =

Rainbow-colored house supporting LGBTQ rights

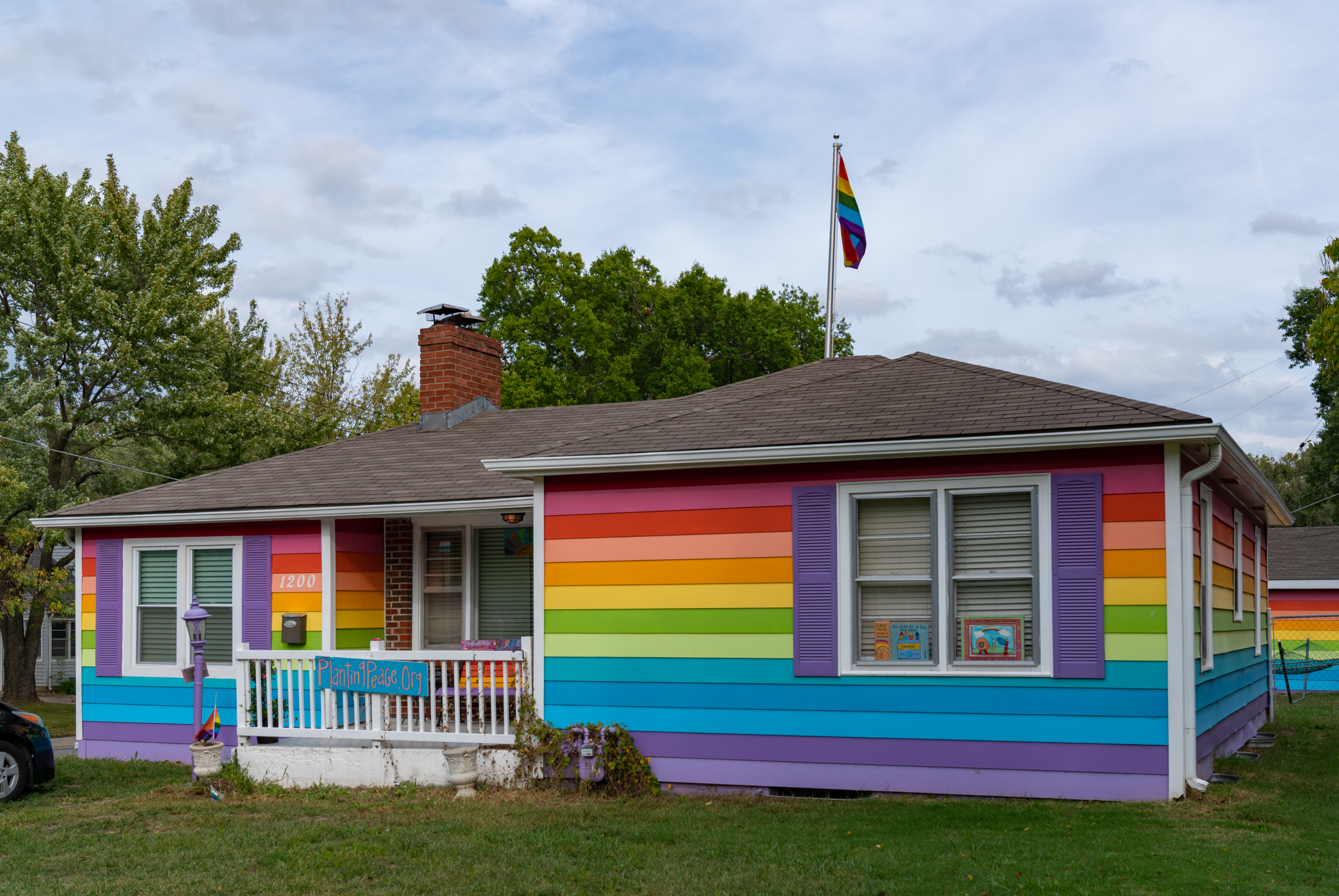
- The Equality House in 2018
- Interactive map of the Equality House area

General information
- Location: Topeka, Kansas, United States
- Coordinates: 39°2′44.4″N 95°43′15.5″W
- Named for: LGBT equality
- Renovated: March 2013
- Cost: $81,000
- Affiliation: Planting Peace

The Equality House is a rainbow-colored house in Topeka, Kansas, that is situated on the corner of 12th and Orleans Street, across from Westboro Baptist Church, an anti-LGBT hate group. The property was purchased by Aaron Jackson, the founder of the nonprofit organization Planting Peace, after he saw a "for sale" sign on a nearby house when looking at the community on Google Earth. He had the house painted in the colors of the rainbow flag to show support for LGBT rights.

== History ==
Through Planting Peace, Jackson purchased the house in 2012 for $81,400. In March 2013, a military veteran agreed to paint the house the colors of the rainbow flag in tribute to the LGBTQ pride flag, and it was dubbed the Equality House. It was reported that a representative of Westboro said she loved the paint job because it kept the eyes of the earth on the church's message. The house became a place for volunteers of Planting Peace to live. In 2016, the house also became the organization's main office; in September 2018, the house ceased to be the headquarters and the interior is no longer open to visitors. Visitors are still always welcome to take pictures on the property.

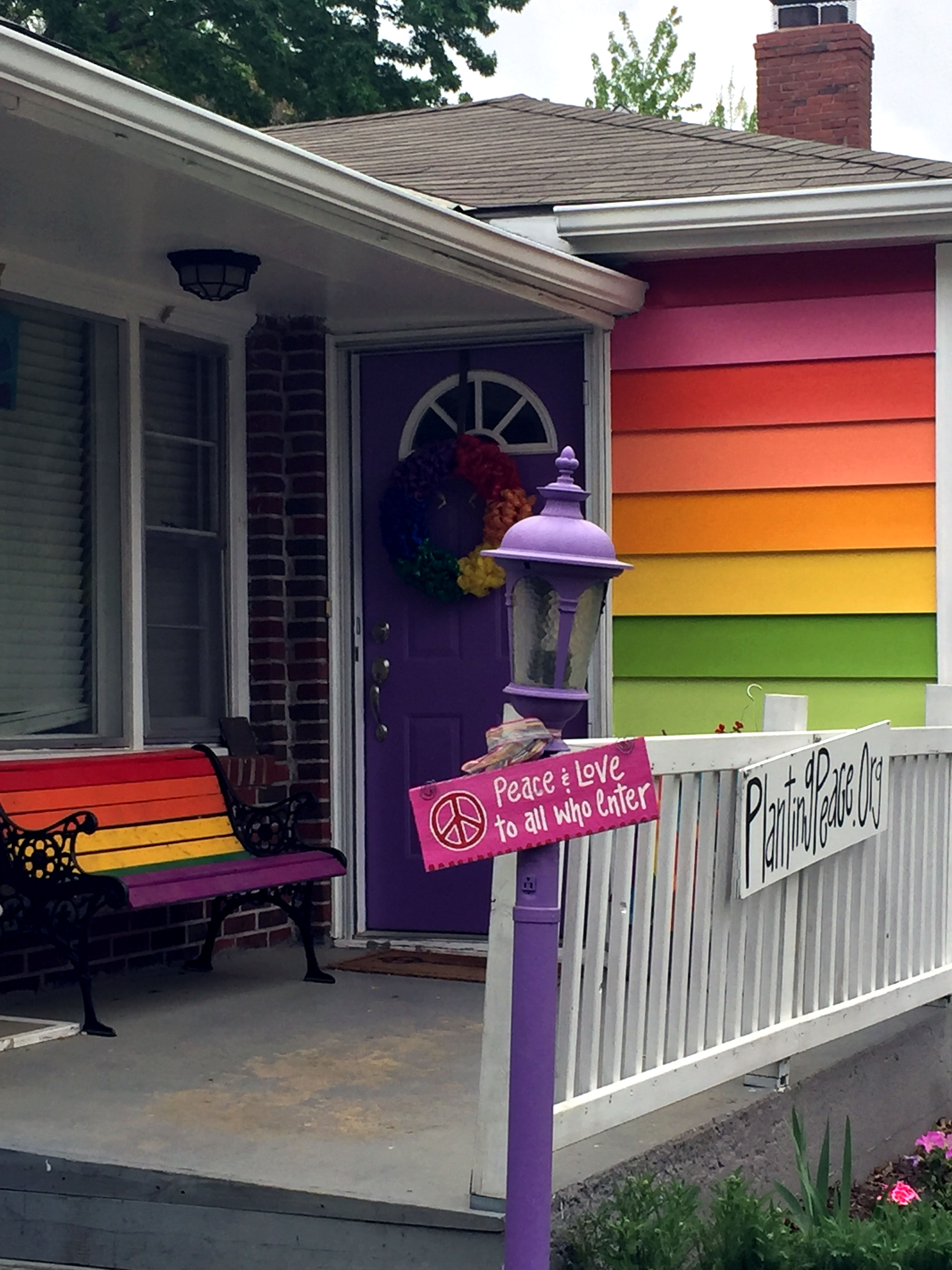
Sign in front of the Equality House

=== Events ===
In June 2013, a five-year-old girl set up a lemonade stand selling "Pink Lemonade for Peace" outside the Equality House in order to oppose the church's message of hate by raising money for love and peace. Westboro members attempted to stop the event by calling the police and yelling profanities. Her $1 "suggested donation" raised $400 on site as well as an additional $1,000 through an online campaign through the website CrowdRise. The money raised went to Planting Peace. The campaign raised $30,000 by September 2014.

Later that same month, a gay wedding was held on the lawn of the Equality House to mark the occasion of the ruling of two historic Supreme Court cases involving LGBT marriage. A lesbian couple from Alabama was married by an ordained Baptist minister who was executive director of the Association of Welcoming and Affirming Baptists, in front of 100 people including well-wishers from the community. Most of the wedding expenses were covered by local businesses and community members.

In October 2013, the organization staged its first drag show at its Equality House called "Drag Down Bigotry", a fundraiser for anti-bullying programs aimed to limit suicide among LGBT youth. The house had its first open house in March 2014. To mark the anniversary of the occasion, Equality House held a day-long party including a tour of the facility featuring "Legacy Project," an exhibition with memorabilia and stories or contributions of the LGBT community. There was a group photo called "Plant one for Peace" featuring couples exchanging a kiss to express compassion.

A staged "wedding" between wizards Gandalf and Dumbledore was held outside the house in June 2015. The event was funded by a Crowdrise campaign after Westboro tweeted that they would picket if such a union was to take place.

In October 2016, the Equality House was vandalized with homophobic slurs and seven bullet holes were found in the exterior. The graffiti and bullet holes were kept in place, and visitors to the house are encouraged to write messages of love on the vandalized wall.

Equality House is intended to stand as a visible symbol of love and has not taken part in community works since the wizard wedding in 2015.

=== Mott House (Transgender House) ===
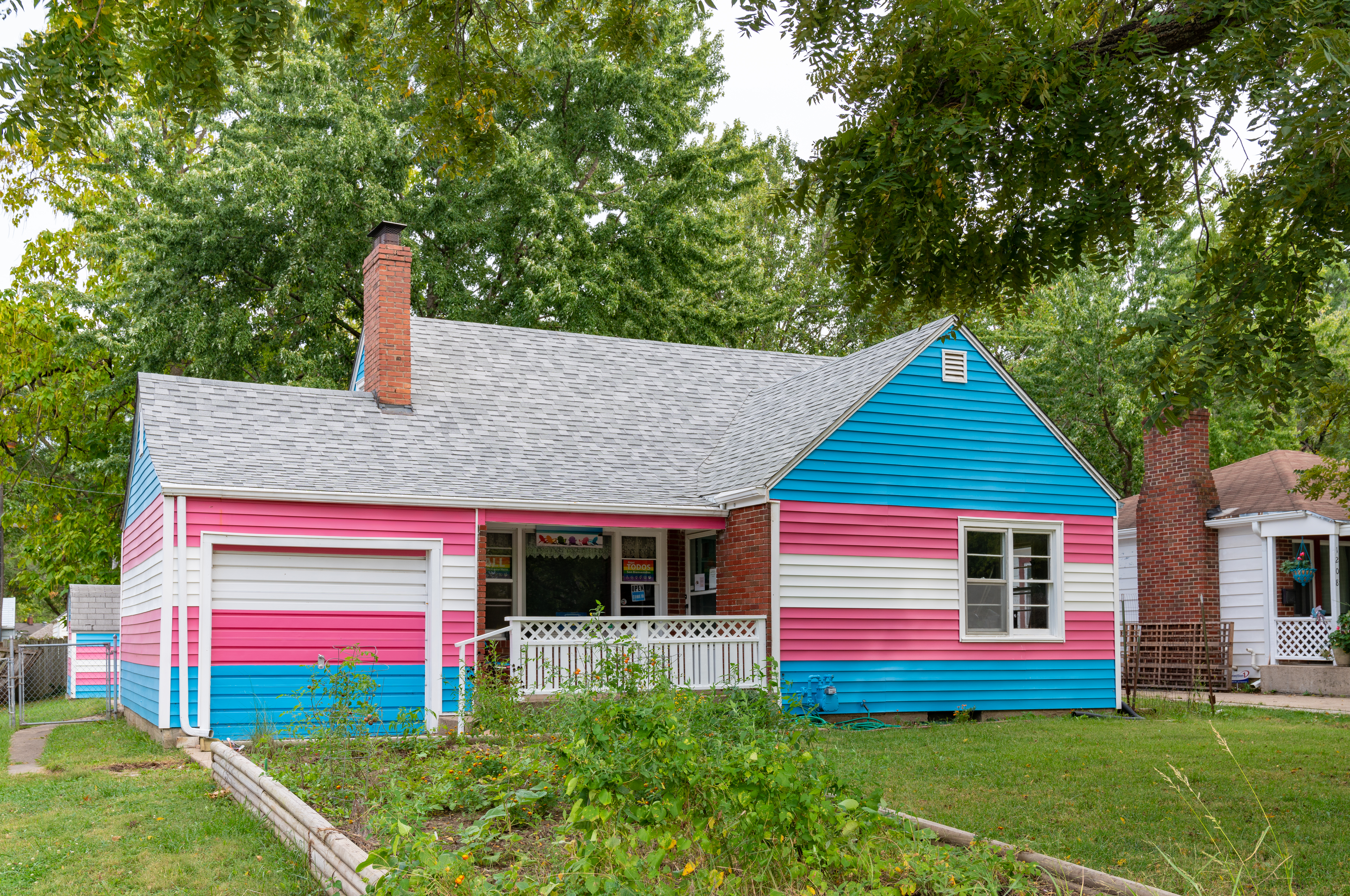
Mott House in 2018

Prior to 2016, the Equality House's rainbow exterior was painted over with the pink, white and blue colors of the transgender flag in honor of the Transgender Day of Remembrance. When 8-year-old Avery Jackson (no relation to Aaron Jackson) visited the Equality House while it was painted with the transgender flag, she was inspired to raise money with Equality House to open a permanent Transgender House. The crowdfunding campaign raised almost $2,000 in three hours; the majority of funding was provided by Martin Dunn, President of the Dunn Development Corp, saying, "if I had a kid that was transgender I would want a place that would celebrate them and accept them. That’s just not available in this country and it should be." Aaron Jackson, founder of Equality House said that the Transgender House intends to serve as an additional symbol of hope for the LGBT community.

The Transgender House, next door to the Equality House, was painted and dedicated on June 26, 2016; since the Equality House and Transgender House do not take part in community works, Jackson donated the use of the house to Capital City Equality Center in July 2017. On March 8, 2019, it was renamed Mott House after the sudden death of Stephanie Mott, one of Kansas' most influential transgender activists.

== See also ==
- Spite house
