= Counter-protest =

Protest action against another protest

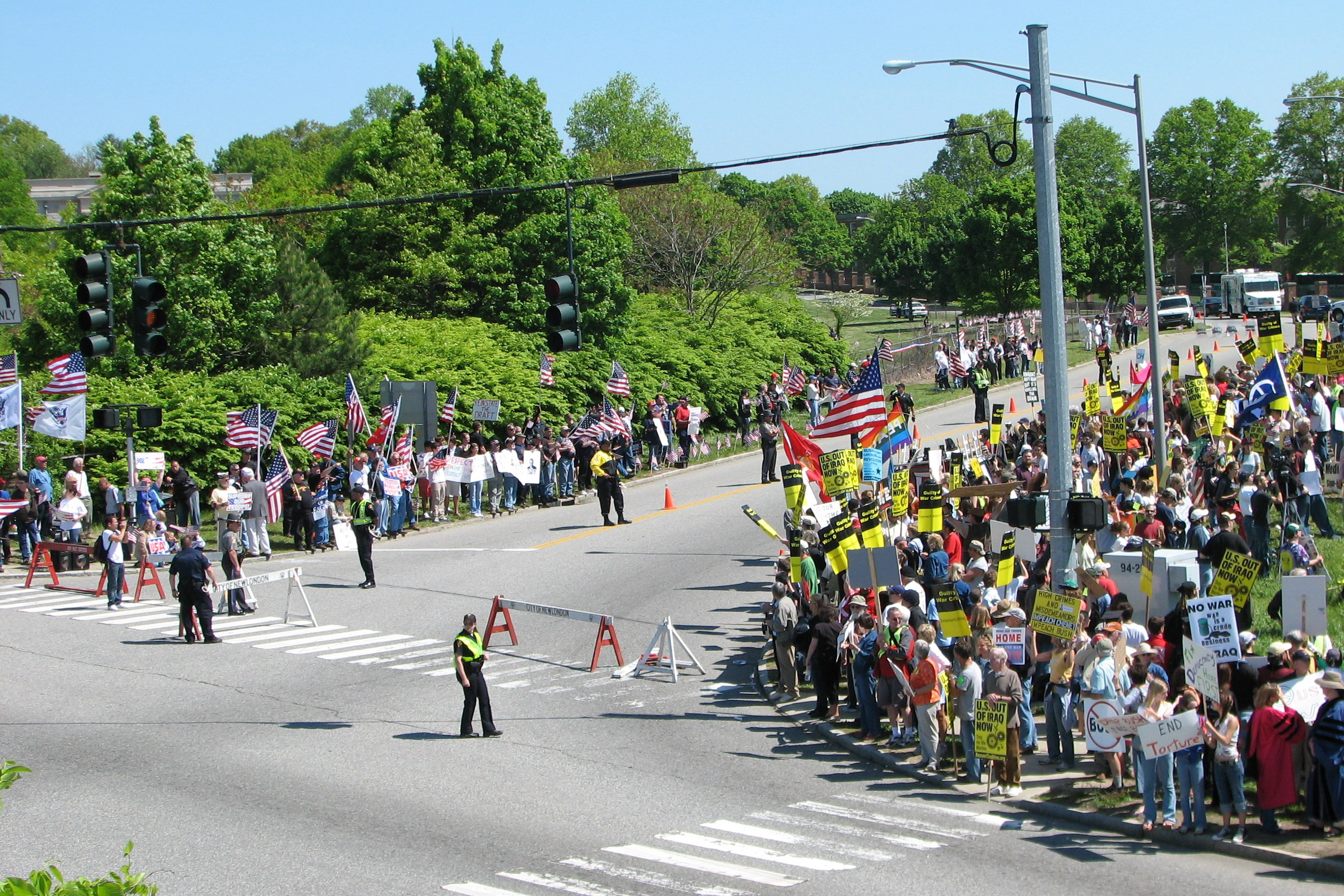
Pro-George W. Bush counter-protestors and anti-Iraq War protestors at the United States Coast Guard Academy in New London, Connecticut, where Bush was giving a commencement speech, in 2007

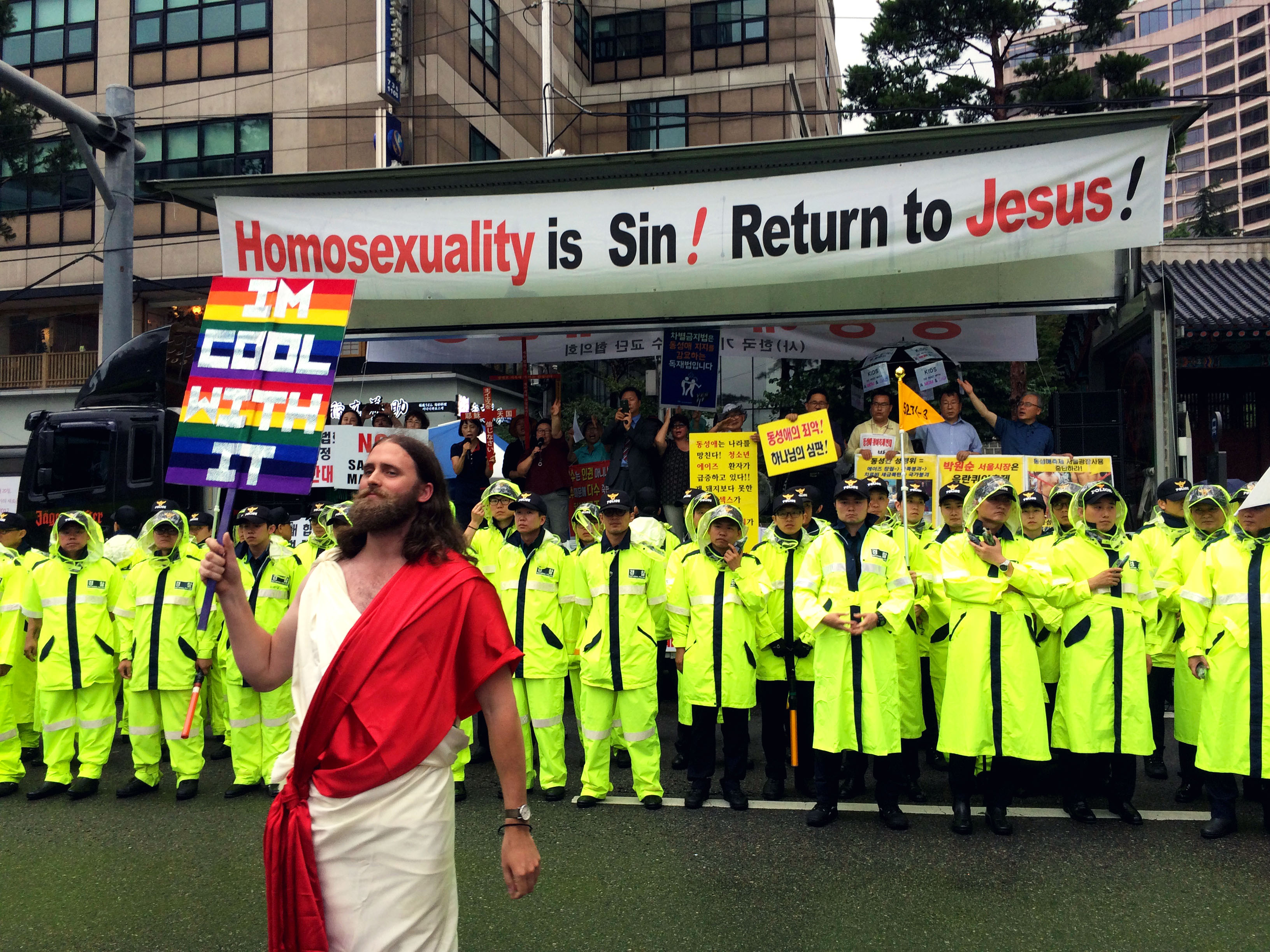
A man costumed as Jesus, counter-protesting an anti-gay demonstration in Seoul

A counter-protest (also spelled counterprotest) is a protest action which takes place within the proximity of an ideologically opposite protest. The purposes of counter-protests can range from merely voicing opposition to the objective of the other protest to actively drawing attention from nearby media outlets away from the other protest toward the counter-protestors' cause to actively seeking to disrupt the other protest by conflict of a non-violent or violent nature.

In many countries where protests by various pressure groups are allowed, the nearby law enforcement installation may make it a priority to keep rival protestors as far from each other as to avoid possible physical contact, and legal contention often arises over whether the rival groups possess permits to gather and rally within a short distance of each other. Often, rallies can be infiltrated by rival protestors for purposes ranging from distraction, disruption to merely asking critical questions of the leaders of the rally or providing humorous or mocking diversions; the reactions of protestors to counter-protestors within close proximity can often be violent and confrontational.

In some countries, governments can even sponsor counter-protestors who rally against opposition figures and members.

== By country ==
=== Cuba ===
In Cuba, various organizations can organize violent pro-government rallies known as "mitines de repudio" (repudiation meetings, often sponsored by the CDR) against groups such as Ladies in White and help in loading the opposition members into police buses directed to a nearby jail.

=== United Kingdom ===
Since World War II, protests by fascist, racist or counter-religious organizations have often been met by anti-racist or anti-fascist groups, many of which are aligned with the Labour Party. Counter-protest activity has been ramped up against anti-Islamist or anti-Muslim organizations since the September 11 attacks in the United States. During the 2024 United Kingdom riots, many anti-racist and anti-fascist organisations, such as Unite Against Fascism, counter protested against far right protesters, many Muslim youth and men also counter protested against far right protesters.

=== United States ===
==== Counter-antiwar protests ====
Since the announcement of the impending invasion on Iraq in 2003, anti-war protests were met with counter-protests by pro-war and socially-conservative groups such as Protest Warrior.

==== Counter-healthcare reform protests ====
After Barack Obama launched an initiative for healthcare reform, protests against government and Congress members by Tea Party members at townhall meetings were met with counter-protests by progressive/liberal activists and pro-labor unionists.

==== Counter-protests against the Westboro Baptist Church ====
The Westboro Baptist Church, which achieved notoriety for protesting homosexuality at various locations and events at which they were not invited, have been met with various counter-protests, including participation from high school and college students when the church members arrived to protest at their campuses.

== See also ==
- Heckler's veto
- Government-organized demonstration
