= Westboro Baptist Church =

American Primitive Baptist church and hate group

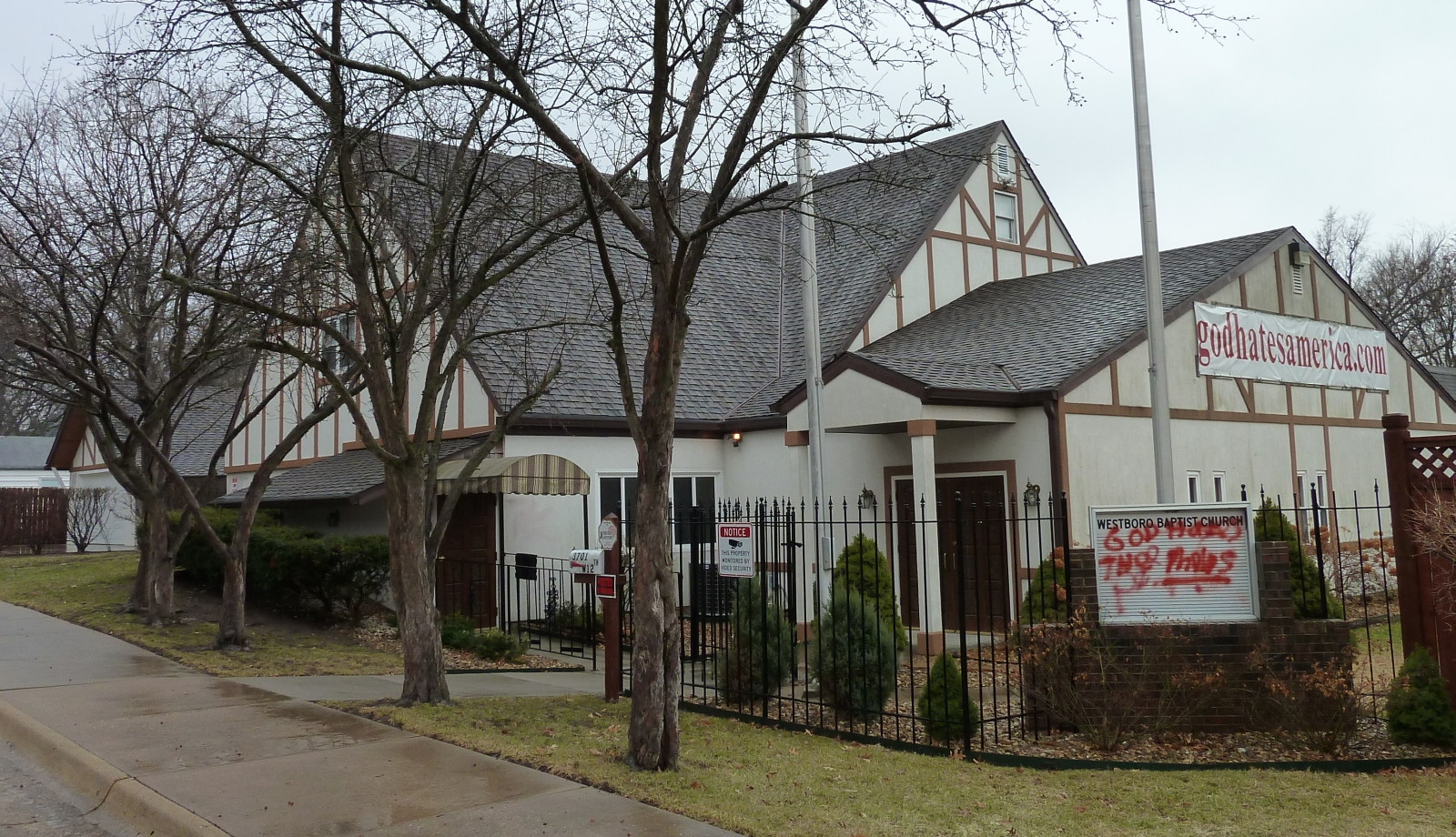
- The headquarters of the Westboro Baptist Church with the sign "godhatesamerica.com". The graffiti on the sign reads "God Hates The Phelps".
- Classification: Primitive Baptist
- Theology: Hyper-Calvinist
- Headquarters: Topeka, Kansas, US
- Founder: Fred Phelps
- Members: around 70 (2016)
- Official website: www.godhatesfags.com
- Logo

The Westboro Baptist Church (WBC) is an American unaffiliated Primitive Baptist church in Topeka, Kansas, that was founded in 1955 by pastor Fred Phelps. Widely considered a hate group, (Note: For hate group descriptor, see: "Westboro Baptist Church". Anti-Defamation League. Archived from the original on July 7, 2010.; "Active U.S. Hate Groups (Kansas)". Southern Poverty Law Center.; Westcott, Kathryn (May 25, 2006). "Hate Group Targeted by Lawmakers". BBC News. Barre, Vermont.; DeLong, Katie (May 21, 2009). "Hate Group Protests at Hamilton H.S." Milwaukee: WTMJ-TV. Archived from the original on July 17, 2011.; Lane, Ray (June 14, 2009). "Anti-Gay Hate Group Targets Seattle Churches". Seattle Post-Intelligencer.; McLaughlin, Mike & Einhorn, Erin (September 27, 2009). "Kansas Hate Group Westboro Baptist Church Protest Brooklyn Synagogues". Daily News. New York.; Williams, Reed & Young, Chris I. (March 3, 2010). "Opponents Rally against Westboro Baptist Hate Group". Richmond Times-Dispatch. Richmond, Virginia. Archived from the original on March 5, 2010.; "Hate group protests this week". The Temple News. Philadelphia: Temple University. March 30, 2010. Archived from the original on April 6, 2010.; Fitzgerald, W.V. (June 16, 2010). "Interview with Westboro Baptist Church: Hate in the Name of God". DigitalJournal.com. Archived from the original on February 25, 2021.) it is well known for its public protests against gay people and for its usage of the phrases "God hates fags" and "Thank God for dead soldiers". It also engages in hate speech against atheists, Jews, Muslims, transgender people, and other Christian denominations. (Note: Specific Christian targets have included Catholics, Methodists, Episcopalians, Lutherans, Presbyterians, Northern and Southern Baptists, Mormons, and Assembly of God Pentecostals.) The WBC's theology and practices are widely condemned by other Christian churches, including the Baptist World Alliance and the Southern Baptist Convention, and by politicians and public figures including former U.S. president Barack Obama.

WBC started protesting against homosexuality in 1989. Within a few years, the group expanded to protesting across the country at both private and public events, including at funerals, sports games, and concerts. The group staged protests at the funerals for victims of the Sandy Hook Elementary School shooting and the West Nickel Mines School shooting. The group is also known to deface the American flag or fly it upside down while protesting, drawing counter-protests.

Although the group's right to protest and use hate speech in the United States is protected by the First Amendment to the Constitution, the group has faced numerous legal challenges over its history. A 2006 Act of Congress called the Respect for America's Fallen Heroes Act, created primarily due to WBC, placed restrictions on protests at some cemeteries. The 2010–2011 US Supreme Court case Snyder v. Phelps shielded the group from tort liability for a 2006 protest at a military funeral. WBC also files its own lawsuits via a Phelps family law firm, and has won cases that have yielded thousands of dollars for the group. Members of the group have been banned from entering Canada and the United Kingdom after attempting to protest in those countries.

In 2016, Forbes stated WBC had about 70 members. The group primarily consists of members of Phelps's extended family, although many of its members have left or been excommunicated. Several family members, including Nathan Phelps and Megan Phelps-Roper, have left the church and become activists against it. Fred Phelps himself was excommunicated from the church around August 2013. Before his death in 2014, a church spokesperson stated that the group had not had a defined leader "[f]or a very long time". Several former members have accused the group of brainwashing and abusive behavior.

== History ==
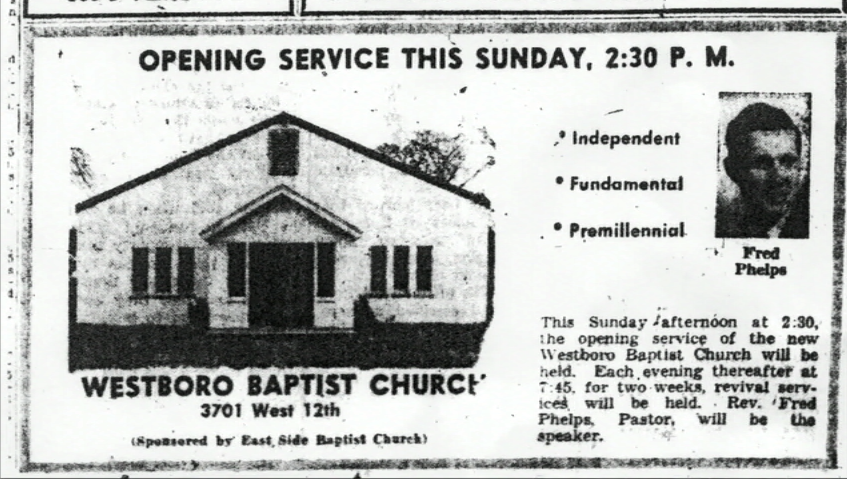
Advertisement for opening service of Westboro Baptist Church, Topeka Capital, 1955

Westboro Baptist Church originated as a branch of the East Side Baptist Church, which was established in 1931 on the east side of Topeka. In 1954, East Side hired Fred Phelps as an associate pastor, and by 1955, Phelps was promoted to pastor of a new East Side church plant, Westboro Baptist, on the west side of Topeka. Its first public service was held on November 27, 1955. Westboro is independent of any denomination, and after Westboro was established, Phelps broke ties with East Side to become entirely independent. His vitriolic preaching alienated nearly the entirety of the original congregation, who either returned to East Side or joined other congregations, leaving him with a small following consisting almost entirely of his own relatives and close friends.

Phelps was a veteran of the Civil Rights Movement in the 1960s. He founded the Phelps Chartered law firm in 1964, which has since been used to sue communities that are targets of Westboro's protests. Westboro Baptist first began protesting homosexuality in 1989 after the discovery of what they referred to as a "tearoom", meaning a public lavatory used for homosexual interactions. The group later began picketing Gage Park six blocks northwest of its headquarters in Topeka in 1991, saying it was a den of anonymous homosexual activity. Soon, its protests had spread throughout the city, and within three years, WBC was traveling across the country. Phelps explained in 1994 that he considered the negative reaction to the picketing to be proof of his righteousness.

On August 20, 1995, a pipe bomb exploded outside the home of Shirley Phelps-Roper, the daughter of Fred Phelps. The blast damaged an SUV, a fence, and part of the house, but no one was injured. In 1996, two men were arrested and charged for the bombing, and both admitted to causing the blast. They had believed Phelps-Roper's house was that of the pastor and wanted to retaliate against Westboro's anti-gay protests at Washburn University. One of the bombers was fined $1,751 and was sentenced to 16 days in prison plus 100 hours of community service.

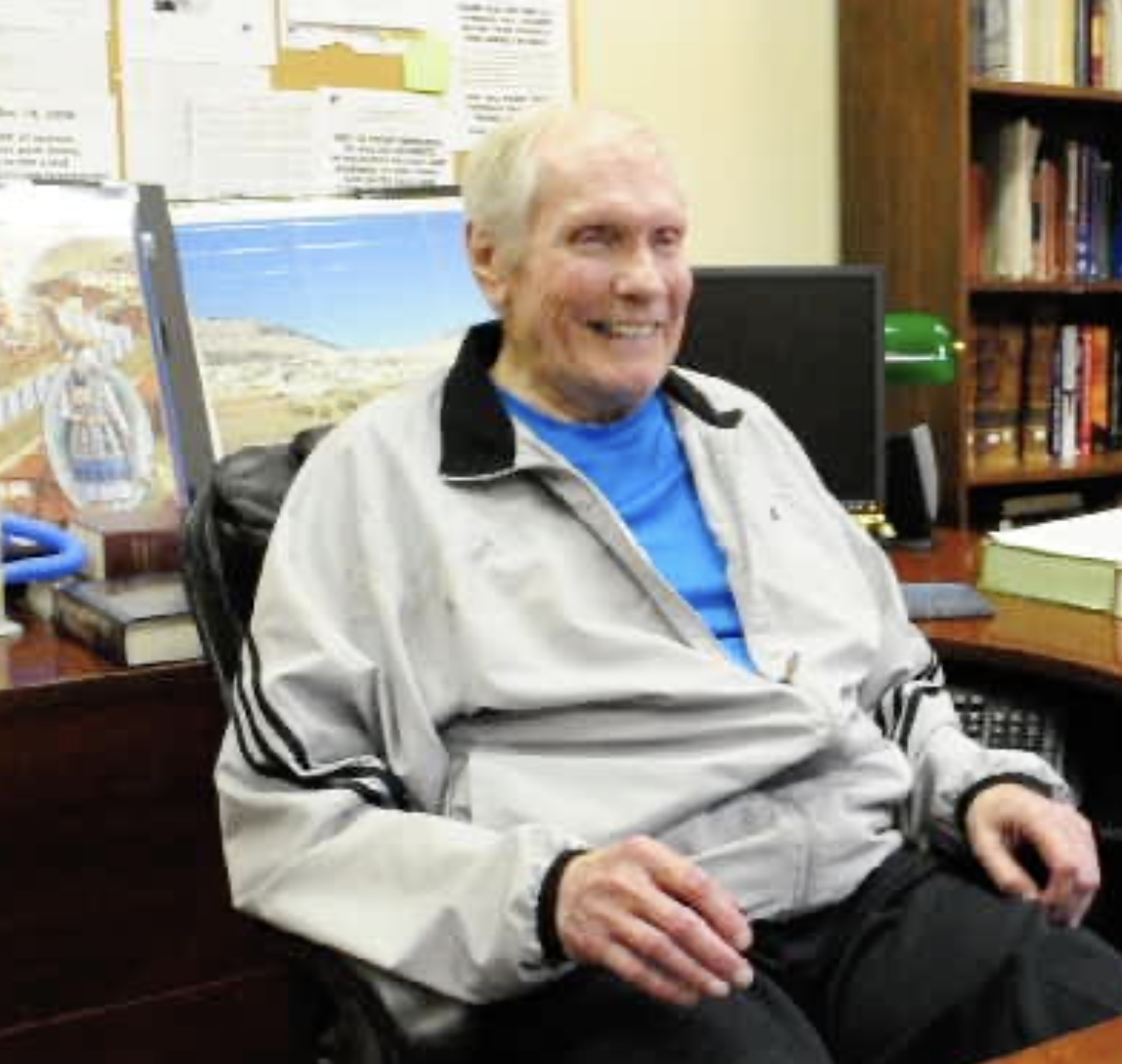
Fred Phelps during an interview in his office (July 7, 2010)

Fred Phelps died of natural causes on March 19, 2014. His daughter Shirley said a funeral would not be held because Westboro does not "worship the dead". He had previously been voted out of his leadership position and, according to representatives, the organization had no defined leader in the time leading up to his death.

== Positions and views ==
Westboro Baptists believe in the Five Points of Calvinism, as reflected in the TULIP acronym that is displayed prominently at the front of the church sanctuary. They believe in limited atonement, unconditional election, and the double predestination of both the saved and the damned, which can weigh heavily on members as well as those who leave the church. According to Barrett-Fox, they see "moral living as a sign of election" and they say they have a duty to preach to the public, not to "save people" (who are predestined) but to spread a message of obedience to God. In her dissertation on Westboro Baptist, she labels this theology as Hyper-Calvinist.

They see themselves as coming from the Primitive Baptist movement. Their Primitive Baptist practices include their style of worship, approach to church discipline, liturgical preferences and seeing themselves as from a "separatist, antiestablishment" lineage (p. 66).

=== Anti-homosexuality ===
WBC is known for its homophobic rhetoric. The Anti-Defamation League describes the group as "virulently homophobic", saying its anti-homosexual rhetoric is often a cover for antisemitism, anti-Americanism, racism, and hatred of other Christian groups. The Southern Poverty Law Center has added WBC to a list of hate groups for its homophobia. The group has also expressed transphobic messages in its protests. Its homophobic outlook has led its members to protest LGBT pride events and funerals of those who died due to HIV/AIDS, as well as to blame homosexuals for mass-casualty events such as the September 11 attacks.

=== Antisemitism ===
Whatever righteous cause the Jewish victims of the 1930s–40s Nazi Holocaust had (probably minuscule, compared to the Jewish Holocausts against Middle Passage Blacks, African Americans and Christians – including the bloody persecution of Westboro Baptist Church by Topeka Jews in the 1990s), has been drowned in sodomite semen. American taxpayers are financing this unholy monument to Jewish mendacity and greed and to filthy fag lust. Homosexuals and Jews dominated Nazi Germany ... The Jews now wander the earth despised, smitten with moral and spiritual blindness by a divine judicial stroke ... And God has smitten Jews with a certain unique madness ... Jews, thus perverted, out of all proportion to their numbers energize the militant sodomite agenda... Jews are the real Nazis.

— Fred Phelps on the United States Holocaust Memorial Museum

In 1996, Phelps began a campaign called "Topeka's Baptist Holocaust", whereby he attempted to draw attention to attacks perpetrated against WBC picketers, saying they were not random but organized attacks orchestrated by Jews and homosexuals. Phelps announced, "Jews killed Christ", and "Fag Jew Nazis are worse than ordinary Nazis. They've had more experience. The First Holocaust was a Jewish Holocaust against Christians. The latest Holocaust is by Topeka Jews against Westboro Baptist Church."

In another statement, he said "Topeka Jews today stir up Kansas tyrants in persecuting Westboro Baptists. They whine about the Nazi Holocaust, while they perpetrate the Topeka Holocaust."

A March 25, 2006, flier regarding a Jewish adversary of Phelps uses the phrase "bloody Jew" four times and the phrase "evil Jew" more than once every 12 sentences. The Anti-Defamation League has criticized WBC and Phelps, and keeps a sampling of WBC's fliers regarding Judaism on their website.

In an interview, Margie Phelps said WBC targeted the American Jewish community because members had "testified" to gentiles for 19 years that "America is doomed" and that "Now it's too late. We're done with them." She also claimed Jews were "one of the loudest voices" in favor of homosexuality and abortion, and that "[Jews] claim to be God's chosen people. Do you think that God is going to wink at that forever?" Phelps concluded by stating, in an apparent reference to the Book of Revelation, that all the nations of the world would soon march on Israel, and that they would be led by President Barack Obama, whom she called the "Antichrist".

=== Islamophobia ===
Jael Phelps said in a 2011 interview that she and the other members of WBC tauntingly and publicly burned a copy of the Quran while being scolded by a Muslim man, calling it an "idolatrous piece of trash" and that they were giving it the "proper respect that it deserves" by doing so. They picketed the funeral of the Muslim man's wife the following week. Jael Phelps said the wife's death was partly due to her Muslim husband having spoken out against WBC, and therefore rejecting God and bringing his "righteous judgement" down upon him. She also commented that "all those angry little Muslims can just shut their mouths."

In 2010, Westboro Baptists said they would again burn a Quran as an example of idolatry today.

=== Barack Obama conspiracy theories ===
Margie Phelps, daughter of Fred Phelps and attorney for WBC, said in an interview with Fox News that Barack Obama would "absolutely" be going to Hell and that he was "most likely the Beast spoken of in the Revelation." She also said Obama's presidency was a sign of the Apocalypse. On January 20, 2013, picketers of the Westboro Baptist Church protested Obama's second inauguration. The protesters had a legal permit and used signs with homophobic messages as well as referring to Obama as the Antichrist.

== Structure and picketing ==
WBC consists primarily of members of Fred Phelps's extended family. According to Forbes, it had roughly 70 members as of 2016, having previously had 80 members in 2011. In her book on Westboro Baptists, religious studies scholar Rebecca Barrett-Fox describes their identification with Primitive Baptists. Members attend a weekly service and believe in a theology of predestination which includes believing all disasters and catastrophes come from the hand of God. Members follow the organization's 'literal' interpretation of the Bible which informs their attitudes towards homosexuality and towards Judaism. The religious justification for active political hate speech has led to much controversy.

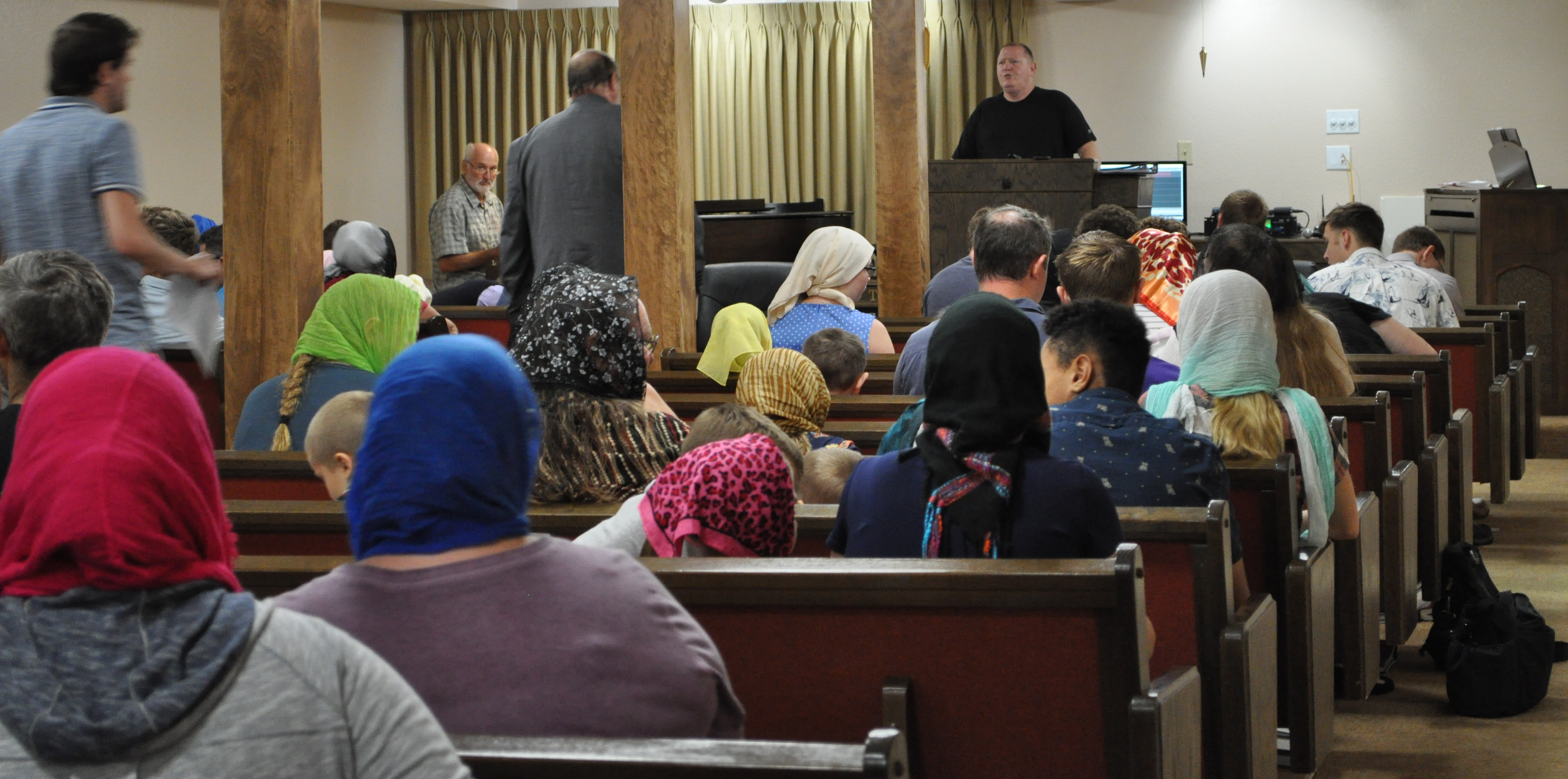
Sunday worship with Pastor Timothy Phelps at lectern, 2018

WBC's travel expenses have exceeded as much as $200,000 annually. One of Westboro's followers estimated the organization spends $250,000 a year on picketing. According to the Southern Poverty Law Center, it is funded entirely from within the organization and accepts no outside donations. WBC has received money from lawsuits and legal fees, through the closely related Phelps Chartered law firm, when its protests have been unlawfully disrupted. For example, the firm sued the city of Topeka several times in the 1990s, and received $16,500 in legal fees for a court case won against a Marine's bereaved father. Because the firm represents WBC in its lawsuits, it can use money from cases it wins to further fund the organization under the Civil Rights Attorney's Fees Award Act of 1976. WBC is considered a nonprofit organization by the federal government, and is therefore exempt from paying taxes. All five of Phelps Chartered's lawyers are Phelps's children, and eleven of his thirteen children are lawyers. Members of the Phelps family are expected to give ten percent of their earnings to WBC.

WBC carries out daily picketing in Topeka and travels nationally to picket the funerals of gay victims of murder or gay-bashing, as well as those of people who have died from complications related to AIDS. It also pickets other events related or peripherally related to homosexuality; Kansas City Chiefs football games, and live pop concerts. At its peak, the group was able to picket roughly 15 churches a day, including many in Topeka and some events farther afield. The group has protested a number of high-profile events such as the funerals of victims of the Sandy Hook Elementary School shooting and the West Nickel Mines School shooting. As well as protesting these high-profile events, WBC protests many local low-profile events. While the messages are widely condemned, it always ensures its protests are legal in nature. Through keeping the protests non-violent and acquiring the proper permits, WBC avoids legal trouble. However, it is the protesting of military funerals that led to the organization receiving much attention. Its public acts have cast a political spotlight on the group that has given it vast attention for its small size. On two occasions, WBC accepted offers for radio air time in exchange for canceling an announced protest.

WBC also releases parody songs. According to Steve Drain (WBC's public information officer) in an interview with Vice News, "When we make our choice of songs, that really revolves around mostly popularity. It's mostly mainstream stuff, the whole idea of our doing parodies is to preach."

== Legal responses ==
=== Laws limiting funeral protests ===
In response to the protests conducted by Westboro members at Indiana funerals, a bill was introduced in the Indiana General Assembly that would make it a felony to protest within 500 feet (150 m) of a funeral. Shortly before this bill was signed, members of the church had threatened to protest in Kokomo, Indiana, at a funeral service that was being held for a soldier who was killed in Iraq. On January 11, 2006, the bill unanimously (11–0) passed a committee vote, and while members of the church had traveled to Kokomo to protest, they were not seen during or after the funeral service. On May 23, 2006, the state of Michigan banned any intentional disruption of funerals within 500 feet (150 m) of the ceremony.

On May 17, 2006, the state of Illinois enacted Senate Bill 1144, the "Let Them Rest In Peace Act", to shield grieving military families from protests during funerals and memorial services of fallen military service members.

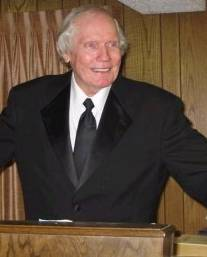
Fred Phelps preaching

On March 29, 2006, the Respect for America's Fallen Heroes Act was introduced by Mike Rogers, a Republican member of the House. The bipartisan bill received a 408–3 vote in the House. The Senate unanimously voted in approval of the law. On May 29, 2006, President George W. Bush signed the bill into law at a Memorial Day ceremony at Arlington National Cemetery. The bill prohibits protests within 300 feet (91 m) of the entrance of any cemetery under control of the National Cemetery Administration from 60 minutes before to 60 minutes after a funeral.

On January 11, 2011, the state of Arizona held an emergency legislative session to pass a bill barring protests within 300 feet (91 m) of a funeral and within an hour from its beginning or end. The bill was swiftly signed into law ahead of the January 12 funeral of those killed in the 2011 Tucson shooting.

On August 2, 2012, the U.S. Congress passed a bill that included restrictions on demonstrators at military funerals, which became law four days later when signed by Obama, who condemned the WBC. This bill was primarily motivated by the WBC's protests at memorial services for victims of the 2012 Sandy Hook Elementary School shooting. Several petitions to the White House were submitted, calling on President Barack Obama to legally recognize the WBC as a hate group, revoke its tax exemption for religious organizations, and to ban protests at funerals and memorial services. The bill mandated staying at least 300 feet (91 m) away from funerals and homes of family members for two hours before until two hours after a funeral. The church condemned the restrictions.

=== Supreme Court case ===
On March 10, 2006, the WBC picketed the funeral of Marine Lance Corporal Matthew A. Snyder in Westminster, Maryland. A cordoned off picket was held approximately 1,000 feet (300 m) from the church for about 30 minutes before the funeral began. Snyder's father, Albert, sued for defamation, invasion of privacy, and intentional infliction of emotional distress. The lawsuit alleged Fred Phelps, Rebekah Phelps-Davis, and Shirley Phelps-Roper were responsible for publishing defamatory statements about the Snyder family on the internet, including that Albert and his wife had "raised [Matthew] for the devil" and taught him "to defy his Creator, to divorce, and to commit adultery". Other statements denounced them for raising their son Catholic. Snyder further alleged the defendants had intruded upon and staged protests at his son's funeral. The defamation count was dismissed on First Amendment grounds, but the case proceeded to trial on the remaining two counts.

District Judge Richard D. Bennett instructed the jury to decide "whether the defendant's actions would be highly offensive to a reasonable person, whether they were extreme and outrageous and whether these actions were so offensive and shocking as to not be entitled to First Amendment protection". On October 31, 2007, Phelps, Shirley Phelps-Roper and Rebecca Phelps-Davis were found liable for invasion of privacy and intentional infliction of emotional distress. The jury awarded Snyder a total of $10,900,000; $2.9 million in compensatory damages, $6 million in punitive damages for invasion of privacy and $2 million for causing emotional distress. The group unsuccessfully sought a mistrial based on alleged prejudicial statements made by the judge and violations of the gag order by the plaintiff's attorney. On February 4, 2008, Bennett upheld the ruling but reduced the punitive damages to $2.1 million. Liens were ordered on WBC buildings and Phelps's law office.

On September 24, 2009, a federal appeals court reversed the lower court's award. It found the picket near the funeral was protected speech because it involved "matters of public concern, including the issues of homosexuals in the military, the sex-abuse scandal within the Catholic Church, and the political and moral conduct of the United States and its citizens", and did not violate the privacy of the service member's family. On March 30, 2010, the appeals court ordered Snyder to pay WBC's court costs of over $16,000, a move Snyder's attorneys referred to as "adding insult to injury".

On March 8, 2010, the Supreme Court granted certiorari in Snyder v. Phelps. On May 28, Senate Majority Leader Harry Reid and 42 other senators filed an amicus brief in support of Snyder. On June 1, Kansas Attorney General Stephen Six filed a separate brief supporting Snyder which was joined by the Attorneys General of 47 other states and the District of Columbia. Several news and civil rights organizations filed amicus briefs in support of Phelps. The Supreme Court ruled in favor of Phelps on March 2, 2011. Chief Justice John Roberts wrote of the 8–1 decision: "What Westboro said, in the whole context of how and where it chose to say it, is entitled to 'special protection' under the First Amendment and that protection cannot be overcome by a jury finding that the picketing was outrageous."

=== Entry bans ===
In August 2008, Canadian officials learned of WBC's intent to stage a protest at the funeral of Tim McLean, a Winnipeg resident who was killed on a bus. The protests intended to convey the message that the man's murder was God's response to Canadian laws permitting abortion, homosexuality, divorce and remarriage. In response, Canadian officials barred the organization's members from entering the country.

In February 2009, British news sources discovered WBC had announced, via its website, its intent to picket a youth production of The Laramie Project to be held at Central Studio, Queen Mary's College in the town of Basingstoke, Hampshire, on February 20, 2009. This would have been its first picket in the United Kingdom. In the lead-up to the picket, Members of Parliament, LGBTQ groups, and lobbyists appealed to Home Secretary Jacqui Smith, requesting WBC be blocked from entering the UK, on the basis of it inciting hatred towards LGBT people. On February 18, 2009, two days before the intended picket date, the Home Office announced Fred Phelps and Shirley Phelps-Roper would be specifically excluded from entering the UK for having "engaged in unacceptable behaviour by inciting hatred against a number of communities", and also other members "could also be flagged and stopped if they tried to enter Britain".

=== Other legal responses ===
One local lawyer, Pedro Irigonegaray, came up with a novel way to battle the Phelpses. When Phelps Chartered, alleging 'emotional damage,' sued someone who had filed a criminal complaint against a WBC member, Irigonegaray's team requested court approval to have a psychiatrist evaluate Phelps family members to determine the alleged damage. The Phelps firm settled without delay.

— Southern Poverty Law Center

In 1995, Phelps Sr.'s eldest grandson, Benjamin Phelps, was convicted of assault and disorderly conduct after spitting upon the face of a passerby during a picket.

In the 1990s, WBC won a series of lawsuits against the City of Topeka and Shawnee County for efforts taken to prevent or hinder WBC picketing, and was awarded approximately $200,000 in attorney's fees and costs associated with the litigation.

In 2004, Phelps Sr.'s daughter Margie Phelps and Margie's son Jacob were arrested for trespassing, disorderly conduct and failure to obey after disregarding a police officer's order during an attempted protest.

In June 2007 Shirley Phelps-Roper was arrested in Nebraska and charged with contributing to the delinquency of a minor. The arrest resulted from her allowing her ten-year-old son to step on a U.S. flag during the demonstration, which is illegal under Nebraska law. The defense contended that the child's actions were protected speech, and that the state law is unconstitutional. The prosecution claimed the demonstration was intended as an incitement to violence, and that Phelps-Roper's conduct might also constitute child abuse. Prosecutors later dropped charges against Phelps-Roper.

On July 14, 2006, Mundy Township, Michigan billed WBC for $5,000, after it had informed the township authorities on June 28 that a protest was planned at the Swartz Funeral Home. The bill to WBC ensued, according to the local police chief, because the organization failed to keep a verbal contract for security. Fred Phelps's daughter claimed that the Holy Ghost had informed them not to fly to Michigan even though they had already purchased airline tickets. Security at the Webb funeral was high; 15 fire trucks were involved, as well as numerous police officers from nearby jurisdictions. The township has stated that it will not pursue the matter.

== Criticisms ==
=== Counter-protests ===
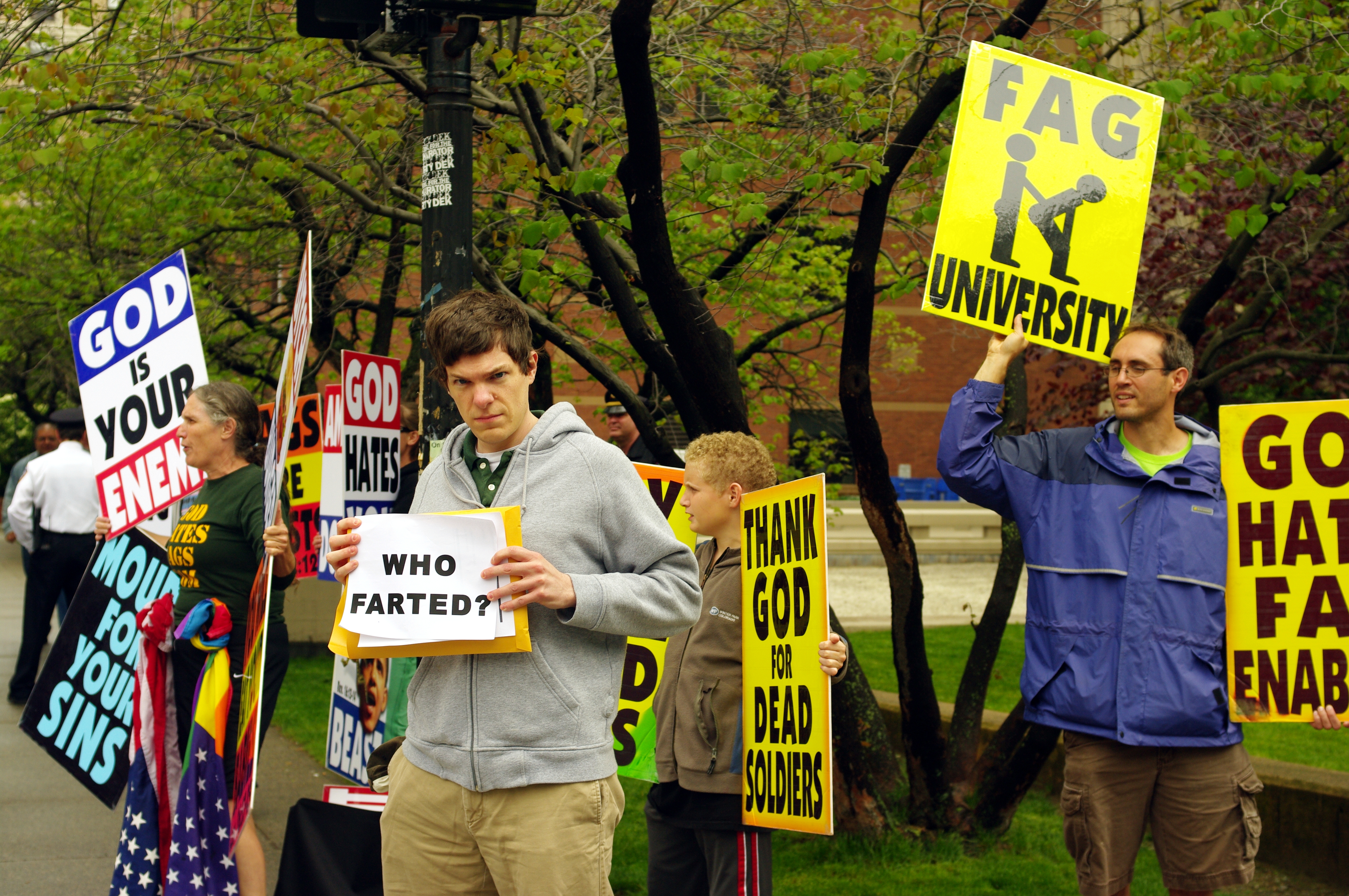
Counter-protester standing in front of WBC at Brown University in May 2009

Counter-protestors have appeared at some of WBC's protests, sometimes numbering in the hundreds or thousands.

Counter-protestors have been known to display humorous signs to mock the group. In particular, the phrase "God hates figs" is commonly used, in reference to Bible stories such as Jesus causing a fig tree to wither. The signs have appeared at counter-protests at the University of Chicago, in Spartanburg, South Carolina, and in Portsmouth, New Hampshire. They also appear at non-WBC-related events, such as the Rally to Restore Sanity. The use of these satirical signs has been praised by the American Civil Liberties Union and others.

Other phrases include "God Hates Fred Phelps", "God Hates Bags", and "God Hates Shrimp". The dysfunctional Cooper family in Kevin Smith's 2011 film Red State was reportedly inspired by WBC.

=== Criticism from other Christians ===
Baptist churches, Baptist-affiliated seminaries, and Baptist conventions, including the Baptist World Alliance and the Southern Baptist Convention (two of the largest Baptist groups), have denounced WBC over the years. In addition, other mainstream Christian denominations have condemned the actions of WBC. Katherine Weber of The Christian Post states that "Westboro is considered an extremist group by most mainstream Christian churches and secular groups, and is well known for its aggressive protesting style."

An alliance of six British religious groups (the Methodist Church of Great Britain, Baptist Union of Great Britain, United Reformed Church, Evangelical Alliance, Faithworks, and Bible Society-funded thinktank Theos) made a joint statement on February 19, 2009, in support of the government's entry ban for members of WBC. They condemned the activities of WBC, stating:

We do not share their hatred of lesbian and gay people. We believe that God loves all, irrespective of sexual orientation, and we unreservedly stand against their message of hate toward those communities. Neither the style nor substance of their preaching expresses the historic, orthodox Christian faith. And we ask that the members of Westboro Baptist Church refrain from stirring up any more homophobic hatred in the UK or elsewhere.

Evangelist pastor Jerry Falwell Sr. referred to Fred Phelps as "a first-class nut". WBC picketed Falwell's funeral service on May 22, 2007.

In 2013, Christian rock band Five Iron Frenzy recorded a song titled "God Hates Flags" condemning the actions of the Westboro Baptist Church and similar organizations, including such lyrics as "If God is love you got it wrong waving all your placards and flags".

=== Other criticisms ===
A number of critics have alleged that the actions of WBC are merely a ploy to receive publicity, and argue that ignoring it completely would be more effective than counter-protests.

Political commentator Bill O'Reilly frequently criticizes WBC, and has called them "evil and despicable". During Snyder v. Phelps, he offered to pay Albert Snyder's legal costs. Documentary filmmaker Michael Moore has also criticized WBC. In response to WBC's protests after the Sandy Hook shooting, rapper Mac Lethal criticized the group. Heavy metal singer and former Black Sabbath frontman Ozzy Osbourne also denounced the group in 2010 when the WBC made a parody of the song "Crazy Train" for a picket they held during the Snyder v. Phelps Supreme Court hearing with lyrics promoting their ideology, stating "I am sickened and disgusted by the use of 'Crazy Train' to promote messages of hate and evil by a 'church.'"

== Former members ==
Since 2004, over 20 members of WBC, mostly family members, have left the organization and the Phelps family. Several of them have accused WBC of brainwashing.

Mark Phelps, estranged son of WBC's founder, Fred Phelps, left the organization in 1973 and began "formal healing therapy in 1988 and worked toward healing and restoration, overcoming the horrible pain and fear from the 19 years of living with" his father. Mark was re-baptized in a local church in 1994 and stated: "If I had to take my family to court and convict them of being followers of Christ, I am not sure where I would find the evidence."

Libby Phelps-Alvarez, a granddaughter of the late Fred Phelps and daughter of Fred Phelps Jr. left WBC in 2009. In 2017, she released a book entitled Girl on a Wire: Walking the Line Between Faith and Freedom. The book documents her years in WBC and what lead up to her departure. Phelps-Alvarez is now an advocate for gay equality.

Zach Phelps-Roper is the grandson of Fred Phelps and the fourth sibling of the Phelps-Roper family to leave WBC (besides Megan and Grace mentioned below, brothers Joshua and Noah have also left). After attempting to leave the organization five times previously, he finally left in 2014 after his views began to change. He now preaches about a life of empathy and unconditional love.

=== Nathan Phelps ===
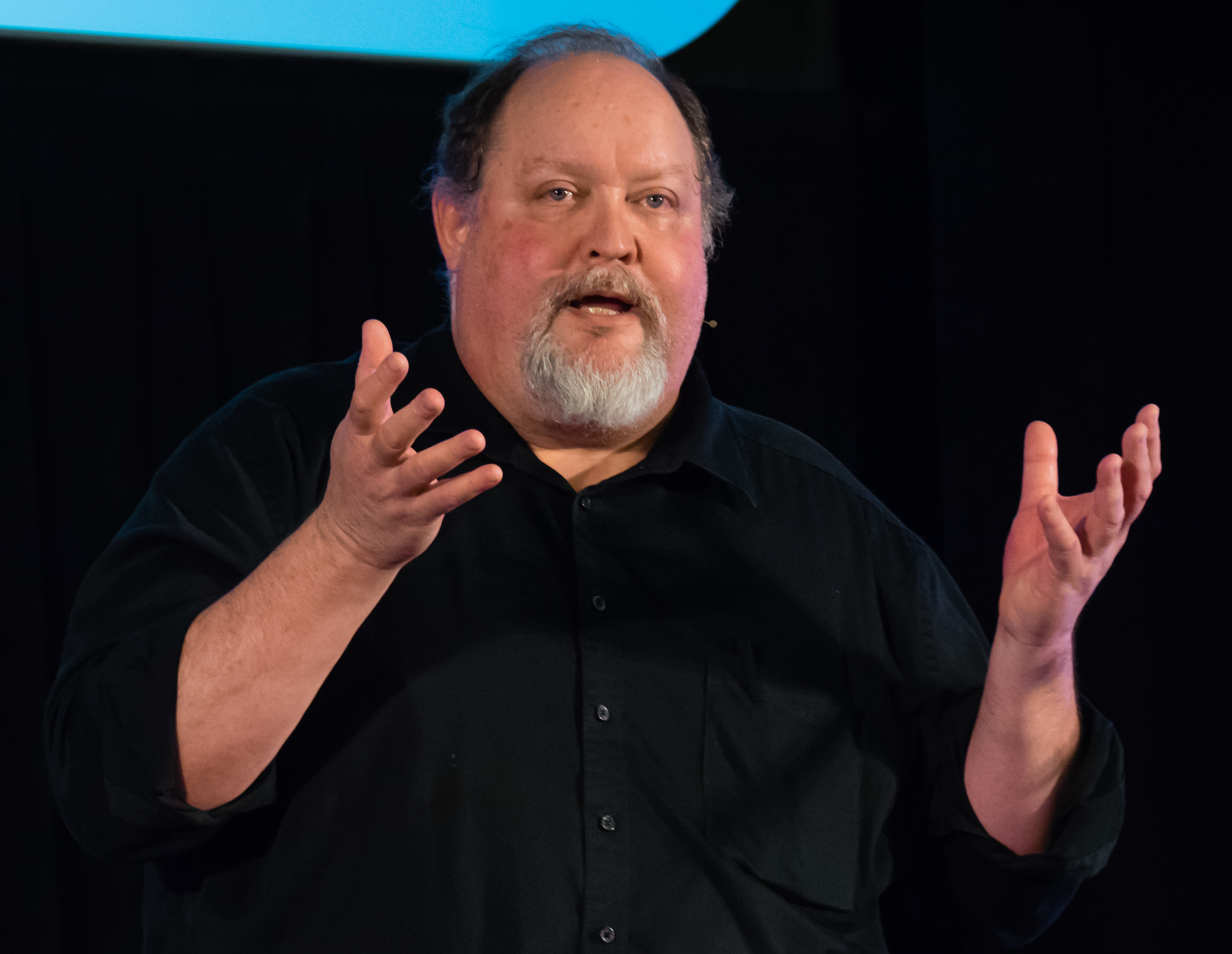
Nathan Phelps, the son of founder Fred Phelps, became a vocal LGBTQ rights and atheist activist.

Nathan Phelps, son of Fred, left Westboro on his 18th birthday in 1976. He has stated that he never had a relationship with his abusive father when he was growing up, and that WBC is an organization for his father to "vent his rage and anger." He has also stated that, in addition to hurting others, his father used to physically abuse his wife and children by beating them with his fists and with the handle of a mattock to the point of bleeding. Phelps's brother Mark has supported and repeated Nathan's claims of physical abuse by their father.

In March 2014, Nathan posted on Facebook that his father was in a hospice in Topeka and was near death, and that Fred was excommunicated from WBC in August 2013, for unclear reasons. These assertions were later reaffirmed by Mark Phelps. Nathan had previously predicted the organization may fall into leadership and theological crises when Fred died, because he had been the binding figure and because their beliefs hold that they are immortal, which would be disproved with the death of a member. WBC spokesperson Steve Drain denied Fred Sr. was on the verge of death and refused to confirm the reported excommunication. Fred Sr. died three days later.

=== Megan Phelps-Roper ===
Megan Phelps-Roper, a grandchild of Fred Phelps, left WBC in 2012 together with her sister Grace, and explained her reasons and experiences in a TED talk. She has written a book entitled Unfollow: A Journey from Hatred to Hope, leaving the Westboro Baptist Church. She has been making a memoir about her experiences, This Above All, whose film adaptation will be directed by Marc Webb, written by Nick Hornby and produced by Reese Witherspoon. and notes that four of her siblings have also left WBC.

=== Lauren Drain ===
Lauren Drain, a former member of WBC who was excommunicated in 2008, released an autobiography titled Banished in March 2013. She characterizes children, like herself, as being brainwashed into their belief system and describes consequences of questioning their belief system, such as her banishment.

== Media coverage ==
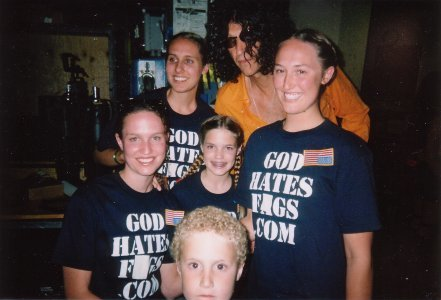
Members of the Church on the set of The Howard Stern Show in 2004

In 2001, Sundance Channel aired the film A Union in Wait, a documentary about same-sex marriage directed by Ryan Butler. Phelps and members of WBC appeared in the film after Phelps picketed Wake Forest Baptist Church at Wake Forest University over a proposed same-sex union ceremony.

In 2005, the British satellite company British Sky Broadcasting produced an investigative piece using hidden cameras, which included footage of two of Phelps's granddaughters, Libby and Jael. In the testimonial, Libby and Jael explain that they hope and pray that no one outside of Westboro becomes "elect", because they want everyone else in the world to die horribly and burn in Hell, and that even if they did not believe their actions were dictated by God, they would still do and enjoy them anyway.

On April 1, 2007, British television channel BBC Two broadcast Louis Theroux's The Most Hated Family in America. In the documentary, Theroux questioned Shirley Phelps-Roper as to whether she had considered if Westboro's protests were more likely to "put people off the Word of Jesus Christ and the Bible". In response, she said, "You think our job is to win souls to Christ. All we do, by getting in their face and putting these signs in front of them and these plain words, is make what's already in their heart come out of their mouth." Later in the documentary, Phelps-Roper agreed the $200,000 WBC annually spent to fly to funerals to protest was money spent to spread "God's hate". While being filmed by Theroux, it picketed a local appliance store because the store sold Swedish vacuum cleaners, which the group viewed as being supportive of gay people because of Swedish prosecution of Åke Green, a pastor critical of homosexuality.

The website godhatesfags.com was prominently featured in The Jeremy Kyle Show, a talk show aired on the ITV network in the United Kingdom on June 5, 2007. Shirley Phelps-Roper and her daughters had been invited to express their beliefs live via satellite. On the show, Kyle criticized the Phelpses for their beliefs and referred to the Phelps children as "completely and utterly brainwashed", and to Phelps-Roper herself as "deranged".

In the June 21, 2007, Channel 4 documentary Keith Allen Will Burn in Hell, starring Keith Allen, on which Phelps-Roper and some of her children agreed to appear, Phelps-Roper admitted on camera that her oldest son, Samuel, was born out of wedlock. Allen declared Phelps-Roper's vocal condemnation of strangers having sexual congress outside of marriage to be hypocritical as she was guilty of the same thing.

Louis Theroux made a follow-up to his first documentary which was broadcast in the UK on April 3, 2011, America's Most Hated Family in Crisis. Theroux reported that Westboro was in a state of "crisis" and documented the departure of several young members. Louis returned for a third documentary, Surviving America's Most Hated Family, in 2019.

== Family tree ==
Fred Phelps family tree

Catherine Idalette | Fred Wade Phelps
Fred Waldron Phelps | Margie Marie Simms
Rachel Phelps Hockenbarger | Shirley Phelps-Roper | Jonathan Baxter Phelps | Timothy Bryan Phelps | Rebekah Phelps Davis | Fred Waldron Phelps Jr. | Abigail Phelps | Margie Jean Phelps | Elizabeth Marie Phelps | Nate Phelps | Katherine Phelps | Mark Phelps | Dorotha Phelps
Samuel Phelps-Roper | Isaiah Phelps-Roper | Rebekah Phelps-Roper | Zacharia Phelps-Roper | Joshua Phelps-Roper | Megan Phelps-Roper | Libby Phelps

== See also ==
- Anti-Catholicism in the United States
- Antisemitism in the United States
- Christian terrorism
- Criticism of Christianity
- Equality House
- Hate speech
- Islamophobia in the United States
- List of organizations designated by the Southern Poverty Law Center as anti-LGBT hate groups
- Societal attitudes toward homosexuality
